= New Jerusalem (disambiguation) =

New Jerusalem is a concept in Christianity and other religions.

New Jerusalem may also refer to:

== Religion ==
- Church of the New Jerusalem, any of several Christian denominations
- Zion (Latter Day Saints), the New Jerusalem in that movement

== Media ==
- New Jerusalem (film), 2011
- 11Q18 New Jerusalem, a Dead Sea Scroll
- New Jerusalem Bible, a Catholic translation of the Bible
- The New Jerusalem (Chesterton book)
- "And did those feet in ancient time", a poem by William Blake with the alternate title "The New Jerusalem"
- The New Jerusalem (Wilby), a brass band piece
- New Jerusalem (play), by David Ives

== Places ==
- Neu-Jerusalem, a neighbourhood in Berlin
- New Jerusalem, California (disambiguation)
- New Jerusalem, Ohio, an unincorporated community
- New Jerusalem, Pennsylvania, town in Pennsylvania, USA
- New Jerusalem Airport, in California
- New Jerusalem Monastery, in Russia
- New Jerusalem theater, in Pernambuco, Brazil
- Nowa Jerozolima (New Jerusalem), a former name of the town of Góra Kalwaria, Poland
- Nowa Jerozolima (New Jerusalem), a short-lived neighbourhood of the town of Bożydar-Kałęczyn, now part of Warsaw, Poland
- Nueva Jerusalén, a short-lived Spanish settlement in the north of Vanuatu
- Žemaičių Kalvarija, Lithuania, known in the 17th century as "New Jerusalem"

== See also ==
- "Let the River Run", a song by Carly Simon including the lyric "the New Jerusalem"
