= Ohio State Route 292 =

State highway in western Ohio, US

State Route 292

Route information
- Maintained by ODOT
- Length: 26.49 mi (42.63 km)
- Existed: 1932–present

Major junctions
- South end: US 33 / CR 153 near Zanesfield
- North end: SR 31 near Kenton

Location
- Country: United States
- State: Ohio
- Counties: Logan, Hardin

Highway system
- Ohio State Highway System; Interstate; US; State; Scenic
← SR 291	→ SR 293

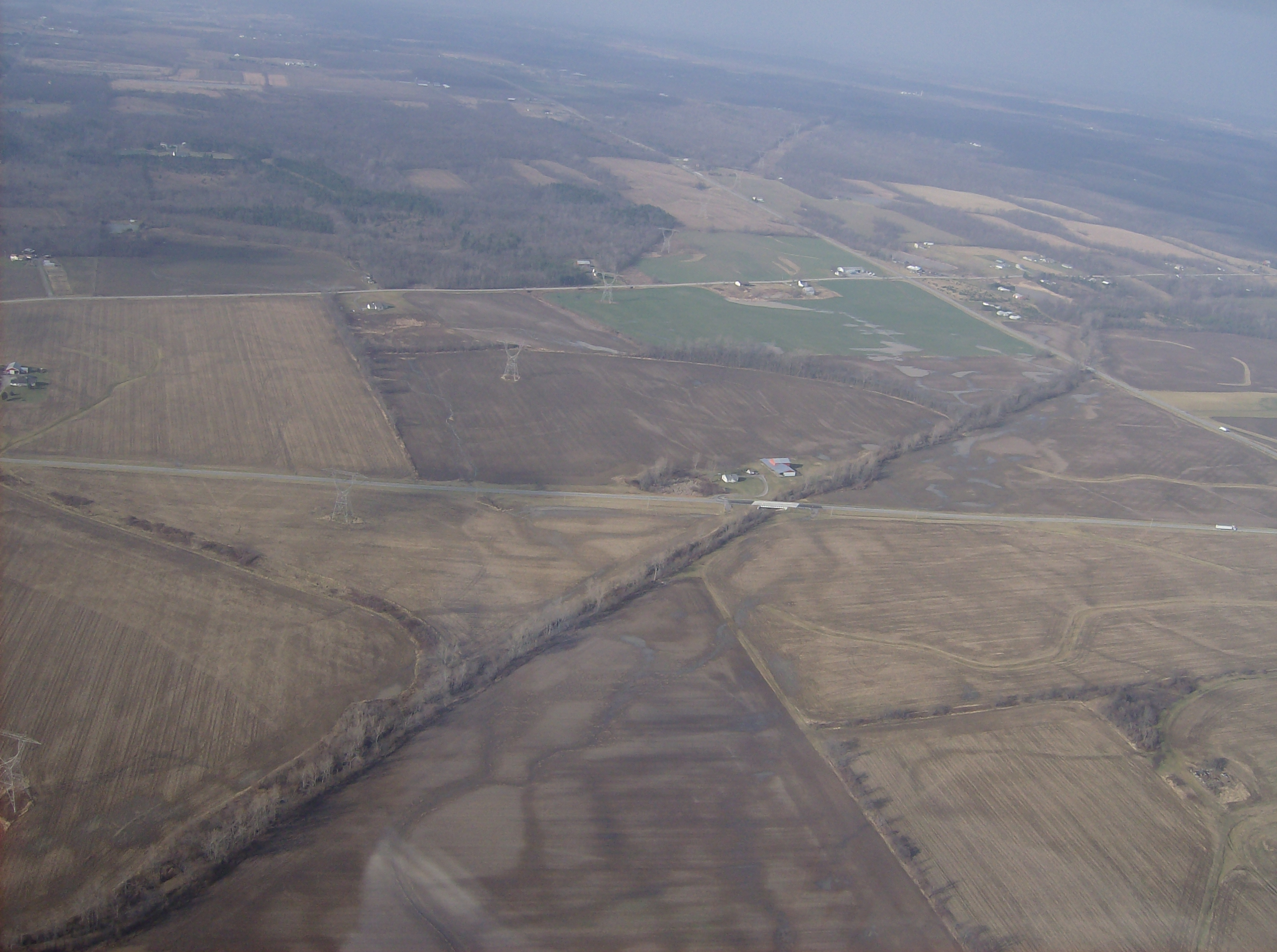
In western Logan County, State Route 292 travels through flat countryside

State Route 292 (SR 292) is a two-lane north–south state highway in the western portion of the U.S. state of Ohio. The southern terminus of the highway is at a diamond interchange with the U.S. Route 33 (US 33) expressway approximately one mile (1.6 km) southeast of the village of Zanesfield. Its northern terminus is at a Y-intersection with SR 31 just south of the city limits of Kenton.

== Route description ==
SR 292 travels through the northeastern quadrant of Logan County and the southern portion of Hardin County. No segment of the highway is incorporated within the National Highway System.

== History ==
Certified in 1932, SR 292 was originally a spur route that traveled from Ridgeway to Mount Victory via its current routing from Ridgeway up to the current SR 273 junction, and SR 273 from that point east to SR 31 in Mount Victory. Five years later, the highway was extended south to East Liberty, and with an extension of SR 273 over what was SR 292 east to Mount Victory, SR 292 was also extended north from the SR 273 intersection north to a new northern terminus at SR 31 just south of Kenton.

By 1997, when US 33 was converted to a four-lane expressway through southeastern Logan County, SR 292 was extended again, taking over several miles of the U.S. highway's former two-lane alignment, as far as a point in southern Jefferson Township between Zanesfield and Valley Hi, where SR 292 arrived at what is currently its southern terminus at a diamond interchange with the new expressway.

== Major intersections ==
County	Location	mi	km	Destinations	Notes
Logan	Jefferson Township	0.00– 0.42	0.00– 0.68	US 33 / CR 153 – Fort Wayne, Columbus, Valley Hi, Mad River Mountain	Interchange
Logan	Perry Township	8.95	14.40	SR 540 west – Zane Caverns	Eastern terminus of SR 540
Logan	Bokes Creek Township	10.81	17.40	SR 47 – Bellefontaine, West Mansfield	
Hardin	Hale Township	19.32	31.09	SR 273 – Mount Victory, Belle Center	
Hardin	Buck Township	26.49	42.63	SR 31 – Kenton	
1.000 mi = 1.609 km; 1.000 km = 0.621 mi
