= Flatwoods, Ohio =

Ghost town in Logan County, Ohio, United States

Flatwoods is a ghost town in Bokescreek Township, Logan County, Ohio, United States.

== History ==
The first settlement at Flatwoods was made in 1854 by Christopher Williams. Flatwoods was originally built up exclusively by Black people.

According to the Logan County Historical Society, additional African American families settled in the area during the nineteenth century. By about 1868, the community had established a Baptist church and a one-room schoolhouse known as Bokescreek Township School No. 10.

One of the school's early teachers was Solomon Day, who attended Oberlin College while teaching in Flatwoods and later became an educator in Dayton, Ohio. The school remained in operation until 1923, when consolidation of one-room schools in the area led to its closure. Flatwoods later declined and became a ghost town.

== Schoolhouse ==
After the school closed, the building was used for agricultural purposes and eventually fell into disrepair. Local preservation efforts beginning in 1999 prevented its demolition, and in 2000 the structure was relocated to Veterans Memorial Park in West Mansfield, Ohio.

An Ohio Historical Marker commemorating the Flatwoods Schoolhouse was dedicated in 2002. The schoolhouse is maintained by the Logan County Historical Society as a living history museum.
