= Ohio State Route 533 =

State highway in Logan County, Ohio, US

State Route 533

- Map of SR 533 c. 2013

Route information
- Maintained by ODOT
- Length: 1.8 mi (2.9 km)
- Existed: 1937–2014

Major junctions
- South end: SR 540 near Bellefontaine
- North end: SR 47 near Bellefontaine

Location
- Country: United States
- State: Ohio
- Counties: Logan

Highway system
- Ohio State Highway System; Interstate; US; State; Scenic
← SR 532	→ SR 534

State Route 533 (SR 533) was a short two-lane north–south state highway in west central Ohio. Existing entirely within Jefferson Township, Logan County, and to the northeast of the county seat of Bellefontaine, SR 533 ran a distance of 1.8 miles (2.9 km) between SR 540 and SR 47 near the campus of Benjamin Logan Local School District. The entire route was turned over by the Ohio Department of Transportation (ODOT) to Logan County jurisdiction by 2014.

== Route description ==
SR 533 commenced at an intersection approximately four miles (6.4 km) east of Bellefontaine where the western and southern legs are formed by SR 540. Following the route of County Road 5 (CR 5) northerly through the farmlands of Logan County's Jefferson Township, SR 533 had one intersection, Jefferson Township Road 127, en route to its endpoint at its junction with SR 47 at a T-intersection near the Benjamin Logan Local School District campus.

== History ==
SR 533 was designated in 1937 along the routing that it occupied until 2014. The entire road was asphalt-paved by 1940. In the winter of 2013/2014, ODOT and the Logan County Engineer arranged a swap of roads within Logan County. All of SR 533 was re-signed as "OLD SR 533" and CR 5 (with which SR 533 was already entirely concurrent) while CR 144 and CR 144A in the southeastern part of the county became state-maintained as an extension of SR 347. Signs designating the extended county road and its status as Old SR 533 have been posted on the former state route.

== Major intersections ==
The entire route was in Jefferson Township, Logan County.

mi	km	Destinations	Notes
0.00	0.00	SR 540 – Zane Caverns	
1.80	2.90	SR 47	
1.000 mi = 1.609 km; 1.000 km = 0.621 mi
