= Horton, Ohio =

- Unincorporated community
- Location within Ohio Location within the United States
- Coordinates: 40°27′11″N 83°33′18″W
- Country: United States
- State: Ohio
- County: Logan
- Township: Bokescreek
- Elevation: 1,073 ft (327 m)
- Time zone: UTC-5 (Eastern (EST))
  - Summer (DST): UTC-4 (EDT)
- GNIS feature ID: 1064866

Horton is an unincorporated community in Logan County, Ohio.
