= Cherokee, Ohio =

Unincorporated community in Ohio, U.S.

Coordinates: 40°26′16″N 83°47′33″W

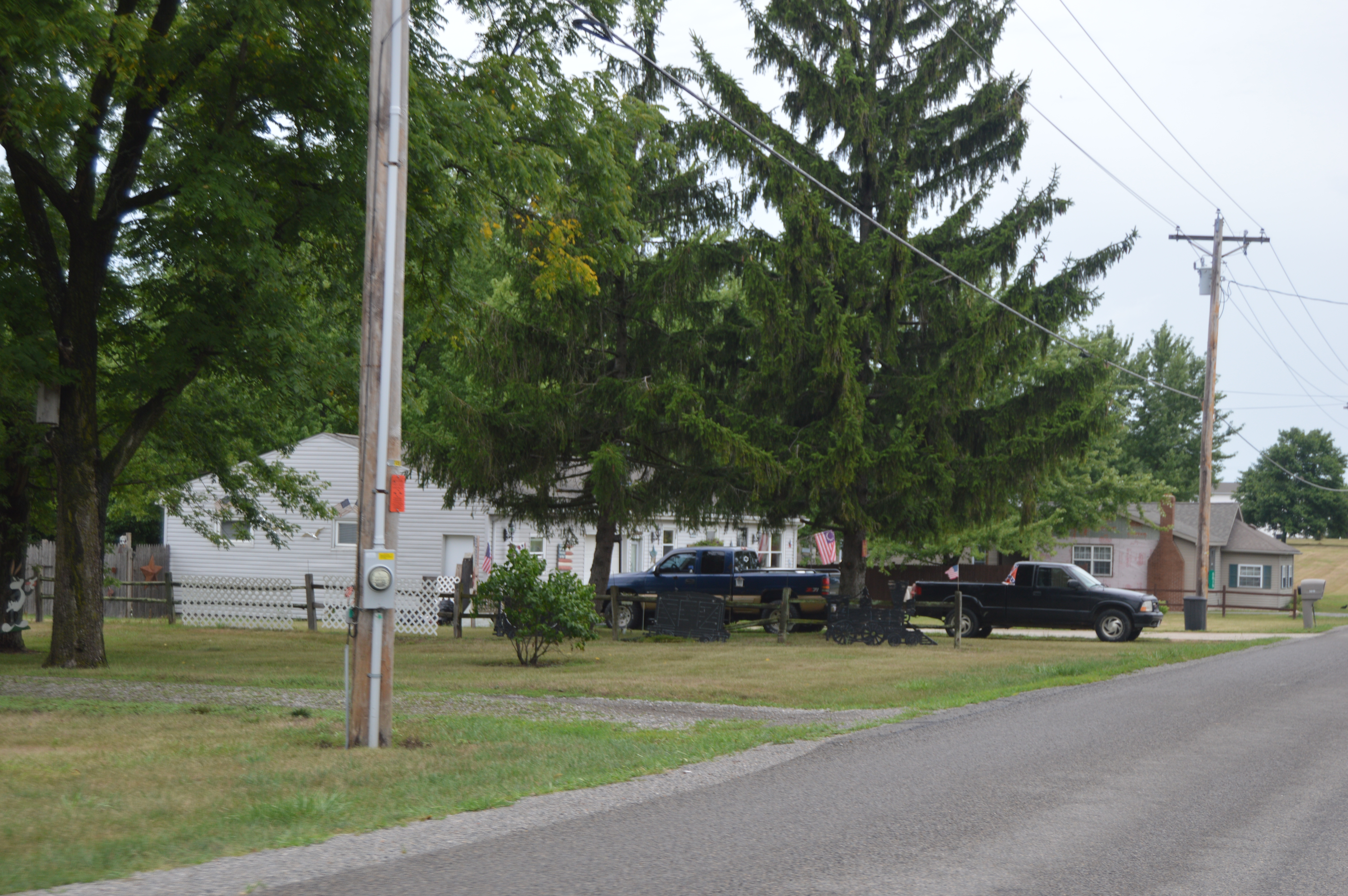
Houses on County Road 39

Cherokee is an unincorporated community in Logan County, in the U.S. state of Ohio.

== History ==
Cherokee was platted in 1832, and named after nearby Cherokee Mans Run. A post office was established at Cherokee in 1832, and remained in operation until 1849.
