= Ohio State Route 347 =

State highway in central Ohio, US

State Route 347

Route information
- Maintained by ODOT
- Length: 20.96 mi (33.73 km)
- Existed: 1935–present

Major junctions
- West end: SR 287 near Middleburg
- US 33 near East Liberty
- East end: SR 37 near Magnetic Springs

Location
- Country: United States
- State: Ohio
- Counties: Logan, Union

Highway system
- Ohio State Highway System; Interstate; US; State; Scenic
← SR 346	→ SR 348

State Route 347 (SR 347) is an east–west state highway in central portion of the U.S. state of Ohio. The western terminus of SR 347 is at SR 287 near Middleburg, adjacent to the U.S. Route 33 freeway. Its eastern terminus is at a T-intersection with SR 37 just one-quarter mile (0.40 km) south of the village of Magnetic Springs. The route runs through rural areas of Logan and Union counties passing through no incorporated villages.

== Route description ==
SR 347 begins at a T-intersection with SR 287 in Zane Township, Logan County just northeast of the unincorporated community of Middleburg. SR 287 heads southwest and southeast from this point, while SR 347 heads northwest. The road at this point is parallel to US 33 which is routed along a freeway, SR 347 through this area is itself an old alignment of US 33. After one and a half miles (2.4 km) and in Perry Township, SR 347 curves around the ramps of an interchange and comes to an intersection with Logan County Route 144. SR 347 turns right at this intersection and reaches the ends of the aforementioned interchange wit US 33. After crossing over US 33, the route passes near the community of East Liberty, the Transportation Research Center facility, and Honda's East Liberty Auto Plant. Past the plant, SR 347 crosses into Liberty Township, Union County travels in a more easterly direction. In the unincorporated community of Raymond, SR 347 shares a brief concurrency with SR 739. The route also passes through the center of Broadway, a small unincorporated community in Taylor Township. For the remainder of the route, SR 347 passes through mostly farmland with intersections with SR 31 in Taylor Township and SR 4 in Leesburg Township. The route ends at a T-intersection with SR 37 just south of Magnetic Springs. SR 37 continues east towards the city of Delaware.

The terrain of SR 347 is mainly flat though near US 33, the route skirts the Union Moraine, location of the highest point in the state. No segment of SR 347 is inclusive within the National Highway System (NHS), a network of highways deemed most important for the country's economy, mobility and defense.

== History ==
The designation of SR 347 took place in 1935. At the time, the highway was a short connector routed along its present alignment between its junction with SR 4 in the hamlet of Pharisburg and its eastern terminus at SR 37 near Magnetic Springs.

In 1937, SR 347 was extended west along most of its current alignment to East Liberty at what would later become US 33, but at the time was known as SR 32. This extension followed a previously un-numbered road. In East Liberty, SR 347 and SR 292 formed a concurrency to both end at US 33 west of the town. Between 1992 and 1994, SR 347 was moved onto a new road south of East Liberty to better serve the auto plant which opened in 1989. The old route to East Liberty became Logan CR 10 and Union CR 347. The intersection with US 33 became an interchange when US 33 was converted to a freeway in the late 1990s.

During the winter of 2013–2014, SR 347 was extended about two miles (3.2 km) over Logan County Routes 144A and 144 to SR 287 as a part of a maintenance swap with Logan County. As a part of the swap, the Ohio Department of Transportation gave up jurisdiction of SR 533 to the county.

== Major intersections ==
County	Location	mi	km	Destinations	Notes
Logan	Zane Township	0.00	0.00	SR 287	
Logan	Perry Township	2.56– 3.01	4.12– 4.84	US 33 – Fort Wayne, Columbus	Interchange
Union	Liberty Township	9.96	16.03	SR 739 south / Shirk Avenue	Western end of SR 739 concurrency
Union	Liberty Township	10.08	16.22	SR 739 north	Eastern end of SR 739 concurrency
Union	Taylor Township	13.93	22.42	SR 31 – Marysville, Kenton	
Union	Leesburg Township	18.77	30.21	SR 4 – Marysville, Marion	
Union	Leesburg Township	20.96	33.73	SR 37 – Delaware, Magnetic Springs	
1.000 mi = 1.609 km; 1.000 km = 0.621 mi: Concurrency terminus
