= Martin Marmon House =

Historic house in Ohio, United States

- U.S. National Register of Historic Places
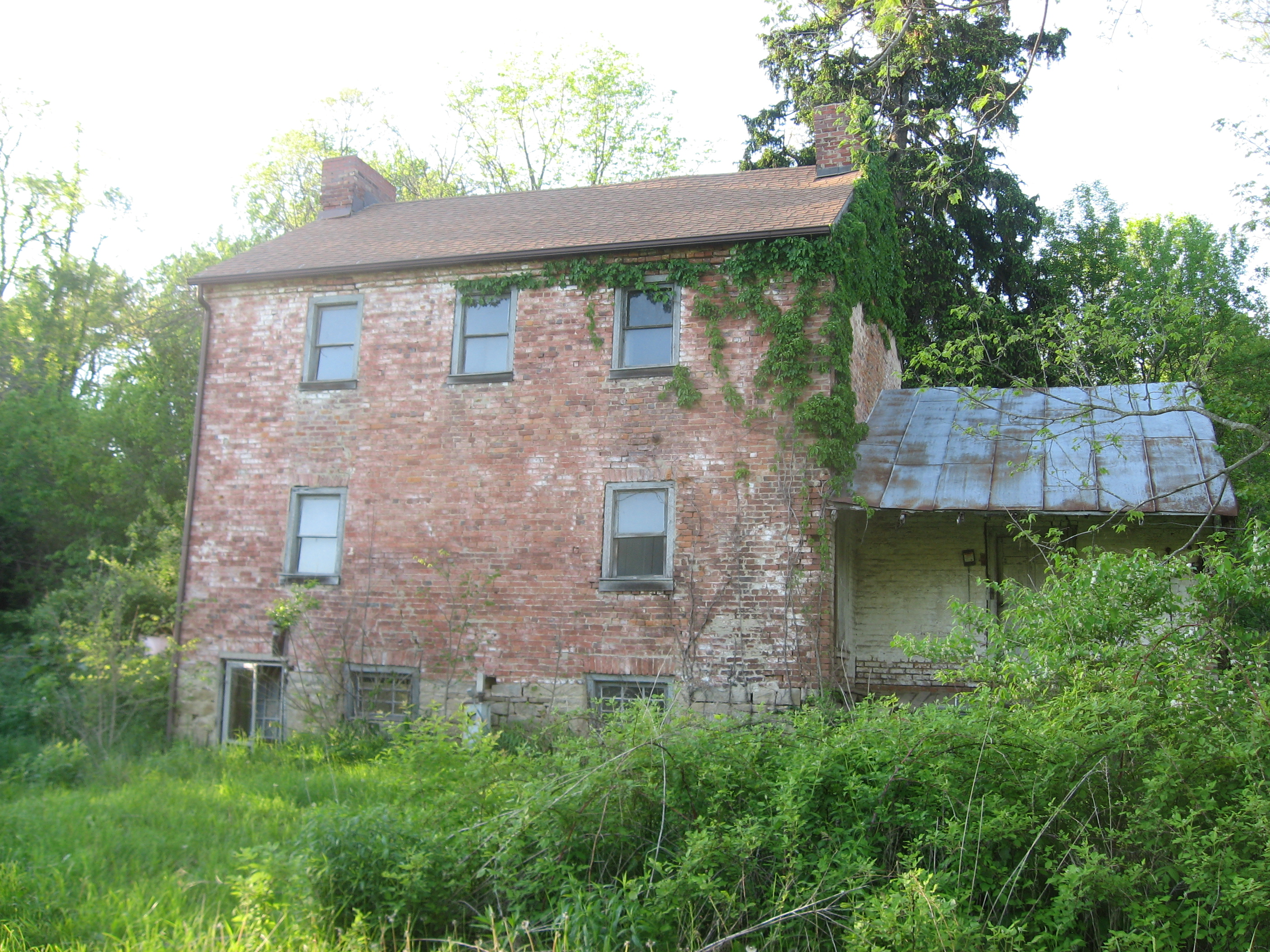
- Rear of the house

- Location within Ohio Location within the United States
- Location: County Road 153, Jefferson Township, Logan County, Ohio
- Nearest city: Zanesfield, Ohio
- Coordinates: 40°19′40″N 83°40′0″W
- Area: 4 acres (1.6 ha)
- Built: 1820
- Architectural style: Quaker-plan
- NRHP reference No.: 86000322
- Added to NRHP: February 20, 1986

The Martin Marmon House is a historic house near the village of Zanesfield in Jefferson Township, Logan County, Ohio, United States. Built by pioneer settler Martin Marmon around the year 1820, it is one of the best remaining examples of Quaker architecture in the area.

== History ==
A Quaker from North Carolina, Martin Marmon moved to west-central Ohio from Kentucky in 1805 with his two brothers and their families; they were the first settlers in Jefferson Township after Isaac Zane, who had married into the Shawnee people then living in the area. This emigration was typical of southern Quakers, who moved north in large numbers to escape the slavery system of the South. Their new home was close to the territory of the Shawnee, being only a short distance south of the Greenville Treaty Line. Ten years after moving north, Martin bought the land on which he had settled from his brother Robert, who lived a short distance to the east. On this land he built the brick house in which he lived for the rest of his life.

The Martin Marmon House was the residence of a leading individual of the day. After Logan County was organized from Champaign County in 1818, Marmon occupied many civic offices in the new county: treasurer of Jefferson Township for twenty-five years, treasurer of Logan County for four years, and county sheriff for five years. The Marmon brothers were also religious pioneers: they founded the Goshen Meeting of Friends in 1807, which as Goshen Friends Church remains the oldest church in what is now Logan County.

After Martin's death, his farm was sold to David Springate, an Englishman from Kent, who settled there in 1864. At that time, the farm included 153 acres (0.62 km^{2}) of land. Today, the house is part of Marmon Valley Farms, a Christian farm and retreat center. It was last used as a residence in 1971. In 1984, the Marmon House was included in the Ohio Historic Inventory survey, and it was added to the National Register of Historic Places in 1986. It is one of four houses in Logan County that is on the Register.

== Architecture ==
Besides its association with the settlement of the Marmon Valley, the Marmon House is significant as a rare example of extant Quaker architecture; it has been assessed as being the best-preserved Quaker house in its part of Ohio. It is typical of a Quaker-style period house, with its stone foundation, its brick 2½-story construction, its window arrangement, and the location of its chimneys. While four other brick houses were built in the vicinity at the same time, none of them retain the integrity of the Quaker architecture of the Marmon House: the Robert Marmon House has been remodelled, two others have been destroyed, and the fourth features a different style of architecture. Some changes have been made to the house: a summer kitchen of uncertain date is attached to the eastern end of the house, the ground floor has been plumbed, and the original roof has been replaced by a tin roof. Also located on the property is a shed and an early spring house. The shed retains enough historic integrity to qualify as a contributing property, but the spring house has been modified significantly. The house sits in an obscure location: although it is only a short distance away from U.S. Route 33, a limited-access highway, and just 100 feet (30 m) from County Road 153, it lies at the bottom of a hill in the middle of thick woods.
