= Ohio State Route 68 =

State Route 68

Route information
- Maintained by ODOT

Location
- Country: United States
- State: Ohio

Highway system
- Ohio State Highway System; Interstate; US; State; Scenic
← US 68	→ SR 69

In Ohio, State Route 68 may refer to:

- U.S. Route 68 in Ohio, the only Ohio highway numbered 68 since about 1933
- Ohio State Route 68 (1923), now SR 47
