= New Jerusalem, Ohio =

Unincorporated community in Ohio, U.S.

Coordinates: 40°22′26″N 83°39′27″W

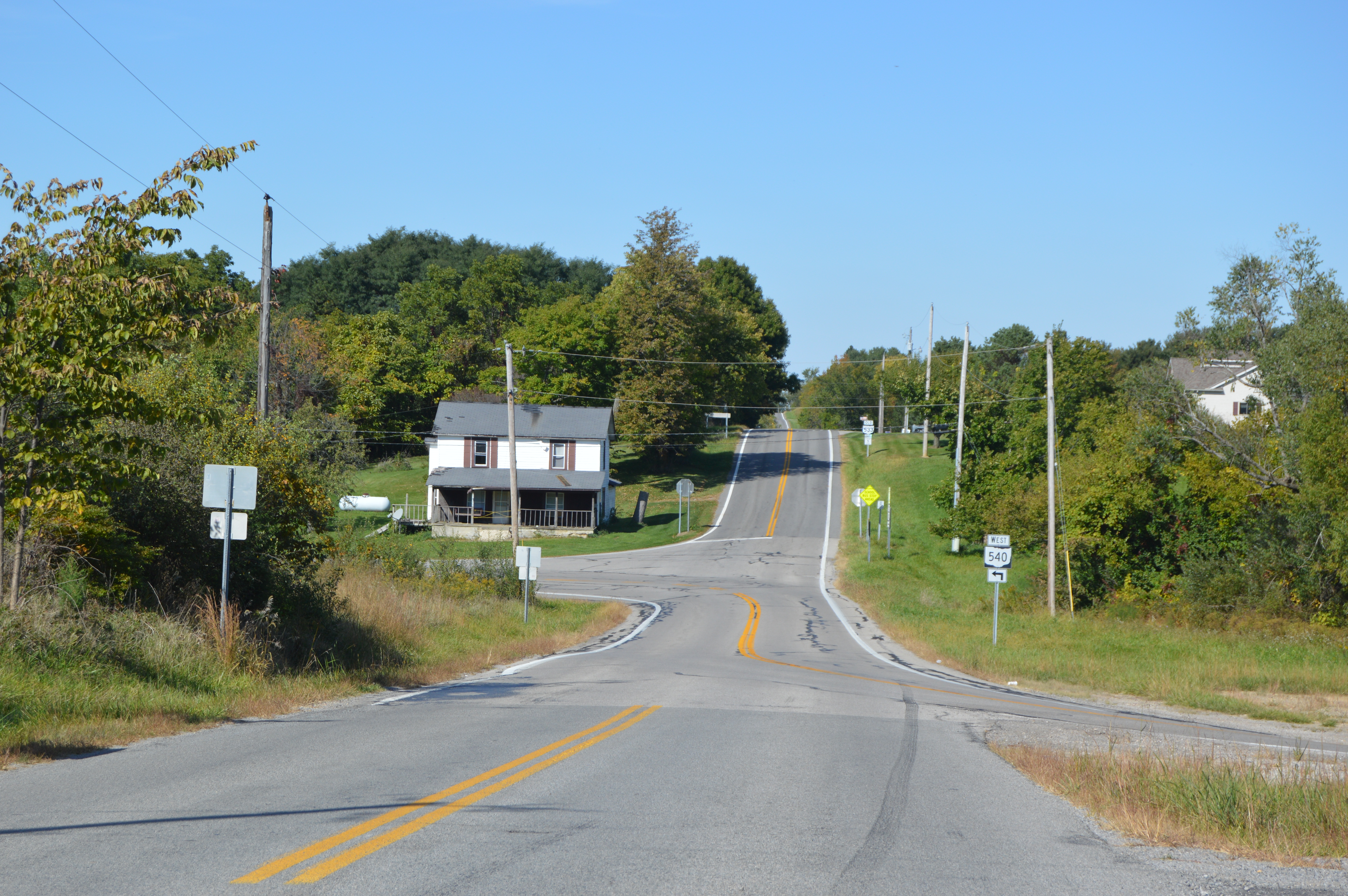
Overview of the crossroads

New Jerusalem is an unincorporated community in Logan County, in the U.S. state of Ohio.

== History ==
A post office was established at New Jerusalem in 1876, and remained in operation until 1904.

== Geography ==
New Jerusalem is located at the junction of Ohio State Routes 533 and 540, between Bellefontaine and the Zane Shawnee Caverns. At an elevation of 1,467 feet (447 m), it is the highest populated place in Ohio.
