= Cherokee Mans Run =

Stream in Logan County, Ohio, US

Coordinates: 40°27′53″N 83°52′45″W

Cherokee Mans Run (also called Cherokee Creek) is a stream located entirely within Logan County, Ohio.

Cherokee Mans Run was named for a Cherokee Indian who settled there.

== See also ==
- List of rivers of Ohio
