= Walnut Grove, Ohio =

Unincorporated community in Ohio, U.S.

Coordinates: 40°25′39″N 83°37′24″W

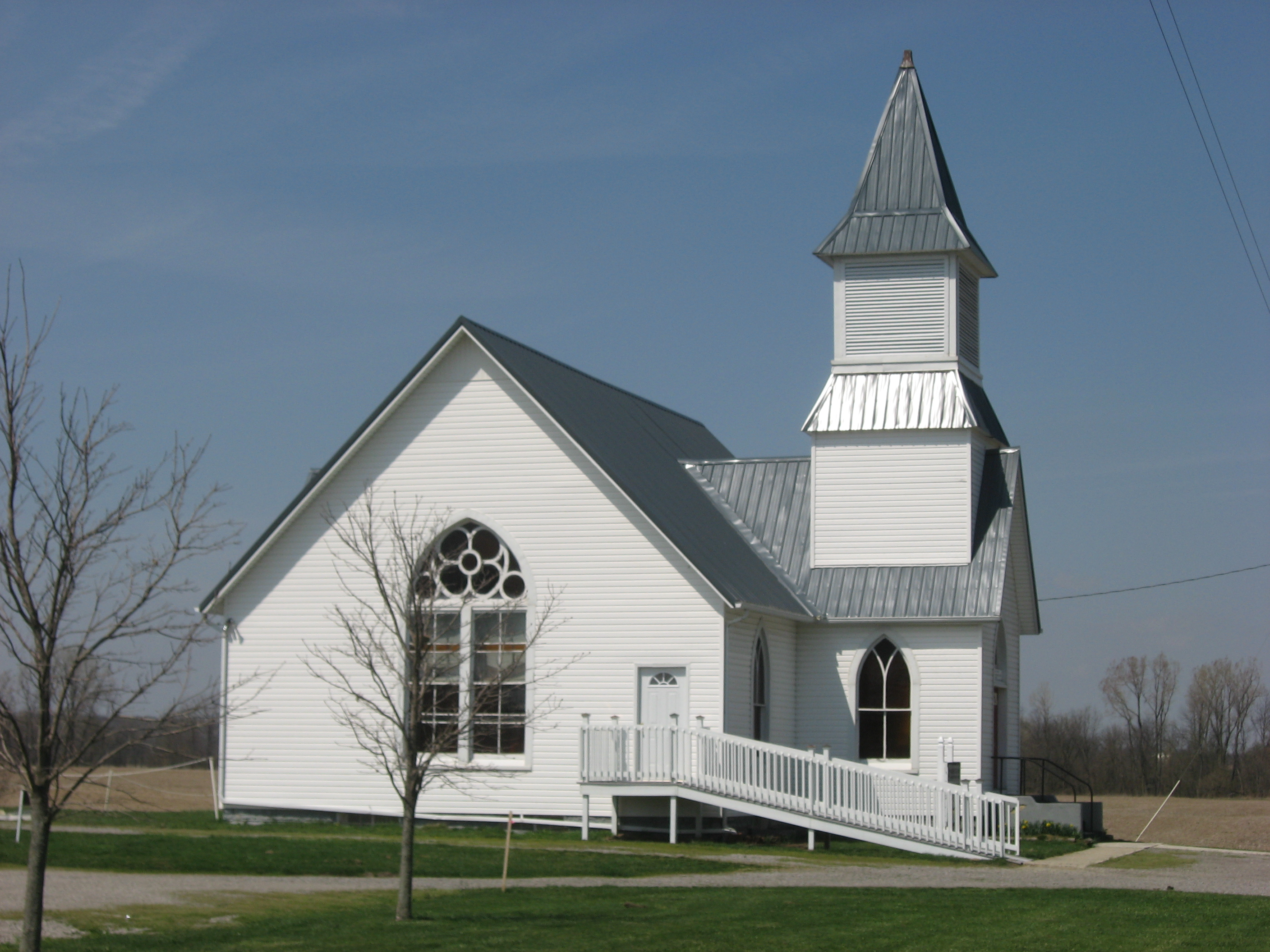
Walnut Grove United Methodist Church, built 1870

Walnut Grove is an unincorporated community in Logan County, in the U.S. state of Ohio.

== History ==
Walnut Grove was laid out in 1854, and named for a grove of black walnut trees near the original town site. A post office called Walnut Grove was established in 1890, and remained in operation until 1902.
