= Big Springs, Ohio =

Unincorporated community in Ohio, U.S.

Coordinates: 40°30′02″N 83°38′08″W

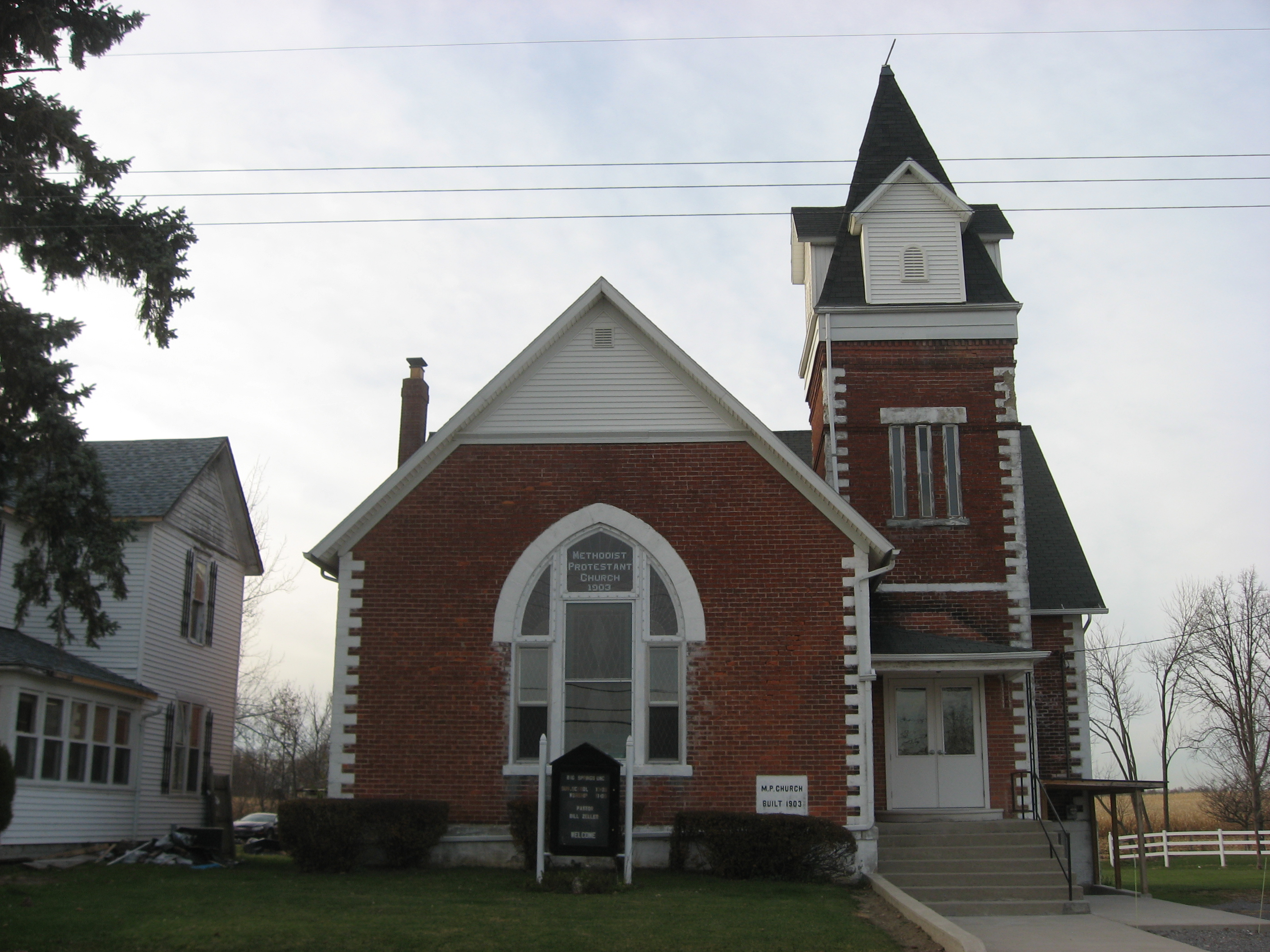
Methodist church

Big Springs is an unincorporated community in Logan County, in the U.S. state of Ohio.

== History ==
Big Springs was laid out in 1852, and named after a spring near the original town site. A post office called Big Springs was established in 1864, and remained in operation until 1935.
