= New Richland, Ohio =

Unincorporated community in Ohio, U.S.

Coordinates: 40°29′09″N 83°46′24″W

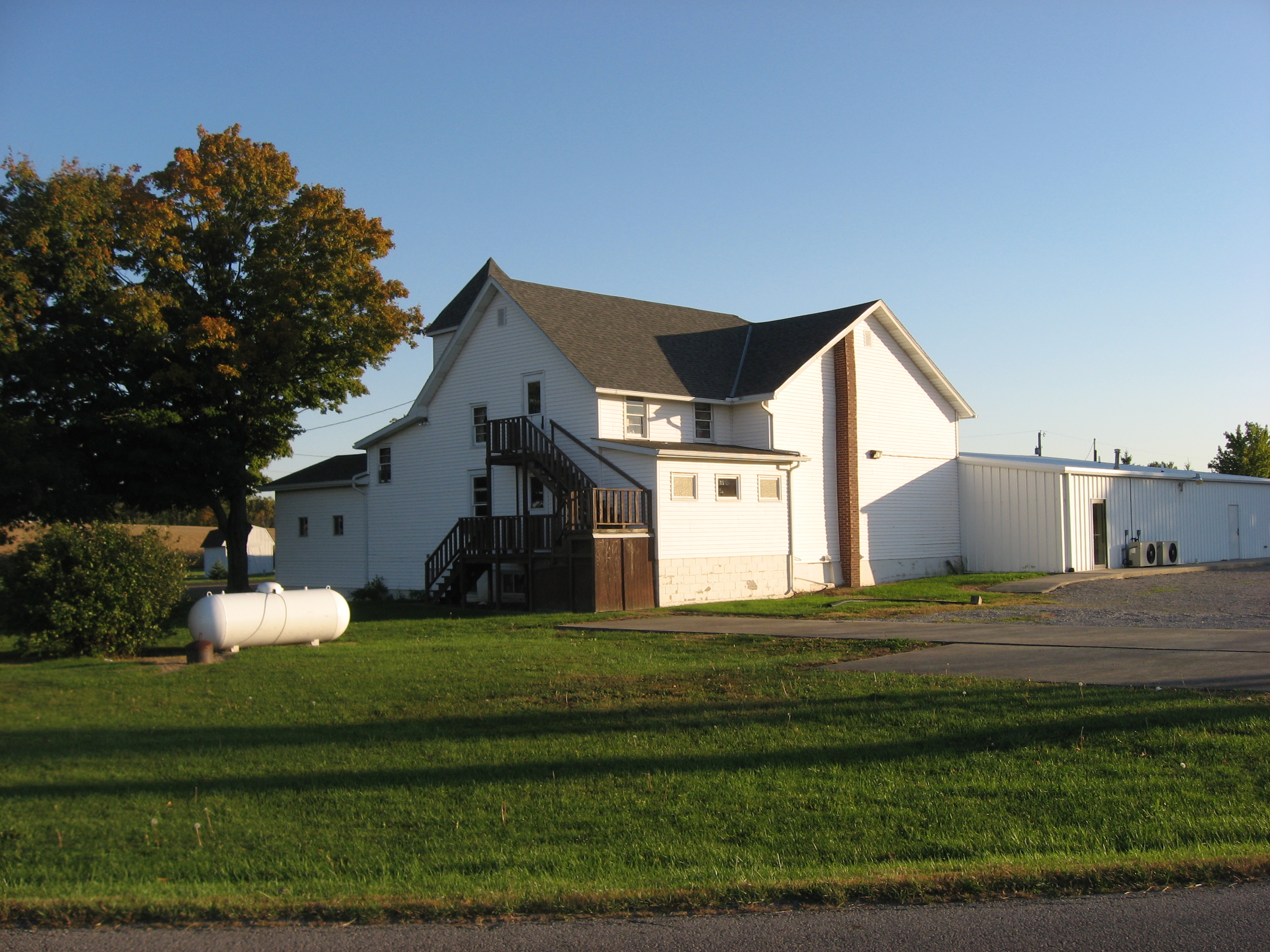
Baptist church

New Richland is an unincorporated community in Logan County, in the U.S. state of Ohio.

== History ==
New Richland was originally called Richland, and under the latter name was laid out in 1832. A post office called New Richland was established in 1846, and remained in operation until 1926.
