= Bokes Creek =

Stream in Ohio, U.S.

Bokes Creek is a stream in the U.S. state of Ohio. It is a tributary of the Scioto River.

Bokes Creek is named after Arthur Boke who was a hunter, scout and friend to surveyor Lucas Sullivant, the man who surveyed the area of Darby Creek and Bokes Creek. According to folk etymology, Bokes Creek derives its name from a Native American word meaning "lost", the creek being so named after an Indian lost his life in the creek. Another source maintains Boke was the name of an Indian chief.

== Location ==
- Mouth: Confluence with the Scioto River west of Delaware 40°19′26″N 83°10′17″W
- Origin: Logan County east of Rushsylvania 40°27′20″N 83°38′13″W

== See also ==
- List of rivers of Ohio
