= North Greenfield, Ohio =

Unincorporated community in Ohio, U.S.

Coordinates: 40°22′39″N 83°35′22″W

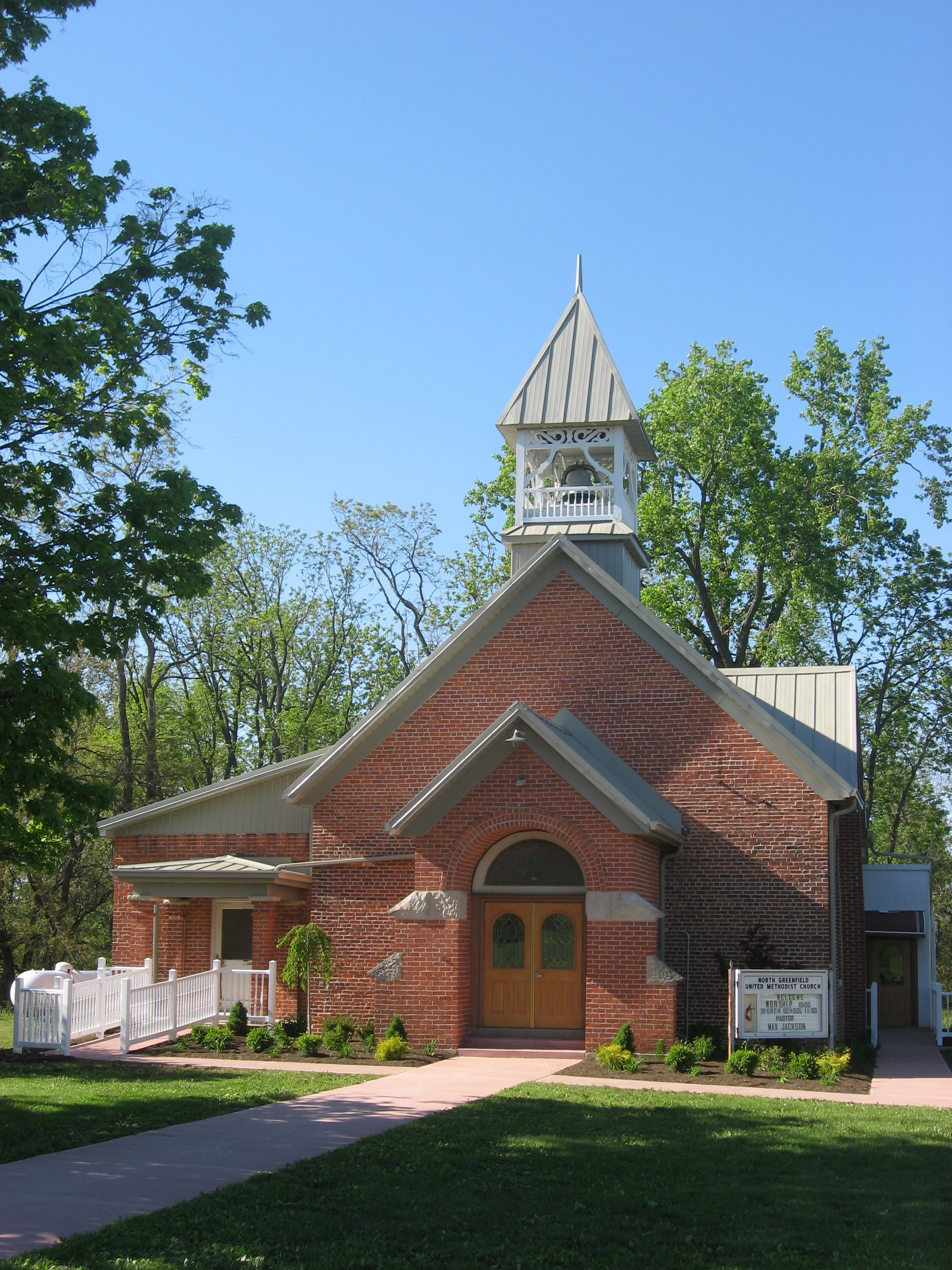
Methodist church

North Greenfield is an unincorporated community in Logan County, in the U.S. state of Ohio.

== History ==
North Greenfield was platted in 1848. A post office called North Greenfield was established in 1865, and remained in operation until 1904.
