= Gretna, Ohio =

Unincorporated community in Ohio, U.S.

Coordinates: 40°20′48″N 83°51′31″W

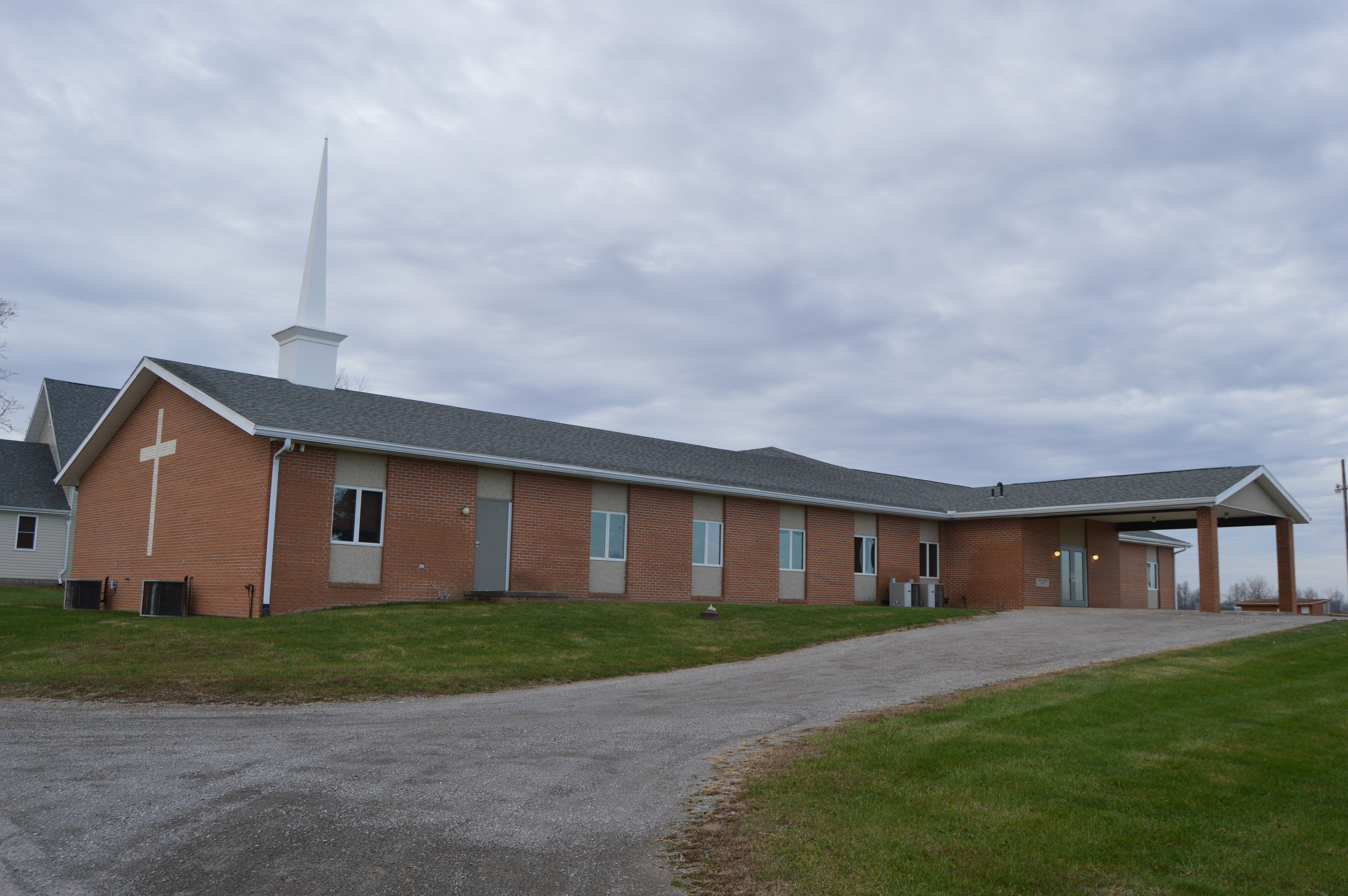
Gretna Brethren Church

Gretna is an unincorporated community in Logan County, in the U.S. state of Ohio.

== History ==
A post office was established at Gretna in 1878, and remained in operation until 1901. Besides the post office, Gretna had a railroad station and country store.
