= Perry Township, Logan County, Ohio =

Township in Ohio, US

- Township
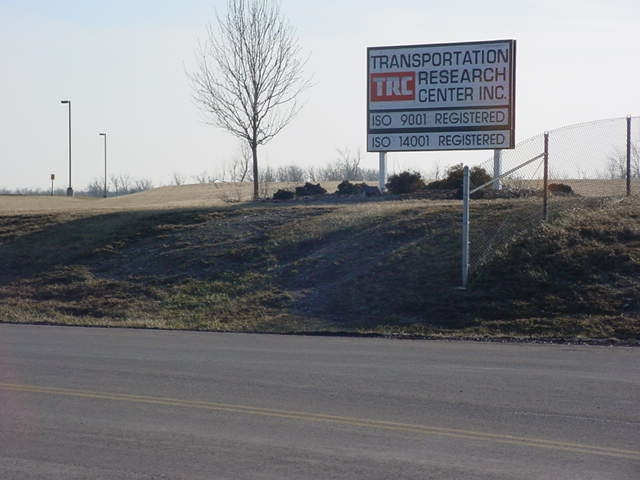
- The Transportation Research Center, a facility owned by Honda and the US government, occupies a large part of Perry Township.

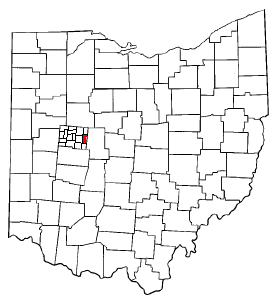
- Location of Perry Township in Ohio

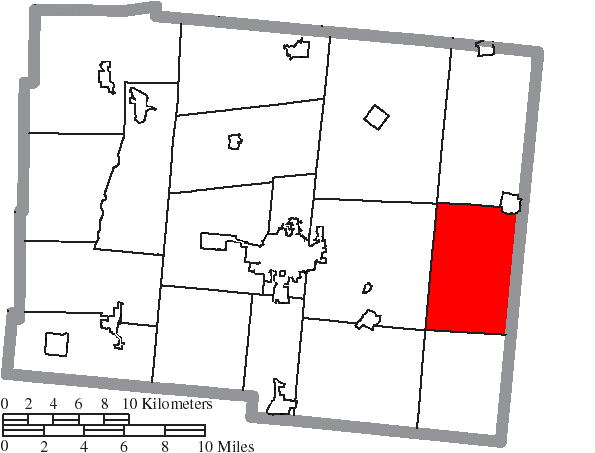
- Location of Perry Township in Logan County
- Coordinates: 40°21′2″N 83°34′15″W
- Country: United States
- State: Ohio
- County: Logan

Area
  - Total: 26.80 sq mi (69.42 km^{2})
  - Land: 26.76 sq mi (69.30 km^{2})
  - Water: 0.046 sq mi (0.12 km^{2})
- Elevation: 1,093 ft (333 m)

Population (2020)
  - Total: 986
  - Density: 36.9/sq mi (14.2/km^{2})
- Time zone: UTC-5 (Eastern (EST))
  - Summer (DST): UTC-4 (EDT)
- Area codes: 937, 326
- FIPS code: 39-61938
- GNIS feature ID: 1086490
- Website: www.perrytownship.net

Perry Township is one of the seventeen townships of Logan County, Ohio, United States. As of the 2020 census, the population was 986.

== Geography ==
Located in the eastern part of the county, it borders the following townships:

- Bokes Creek Township - north
- York Township, Union County - northeast
- Liberty Township, Union County - east
- Zane Township - south
- Monroe Township - southwest corner
- Jefferson Township - west
- Rushcreek Township - northwest

Part of the village of West Mansfield is located in northeastern Perry Township, and the census-designated place of East Liberty lies in the township's south.

== Name and history ==
Perry Township was organized in 1830, and named for Commodore Oliver Hazard Perry. It is one of 25 Perry Townships statewide.

== Government ==
The township is governed by a three-member board of trustees, who are elected in November of odd-numbered years to a four-year term beginning on the following January 1. Two are elected in the year after the presidential election and one is elected in the year before it. There is also an elected township fiscal officer, who serves a four-year term beginning on April 1 of the year after the election, which is held in November of the year before the presidential election. Vacancies in the fiscal officership or on the board of trustees are filled by the remaining trustees.

== Transportation ==
Important highways in Perry Township include U.S. Route 33 and State Routes 292, 347, and 540.
