= Harper, Logan County, Ohio =

Unincorporated community in Ohio, U.S.

Coordinates: 40°25′44″N 83°42′30″W

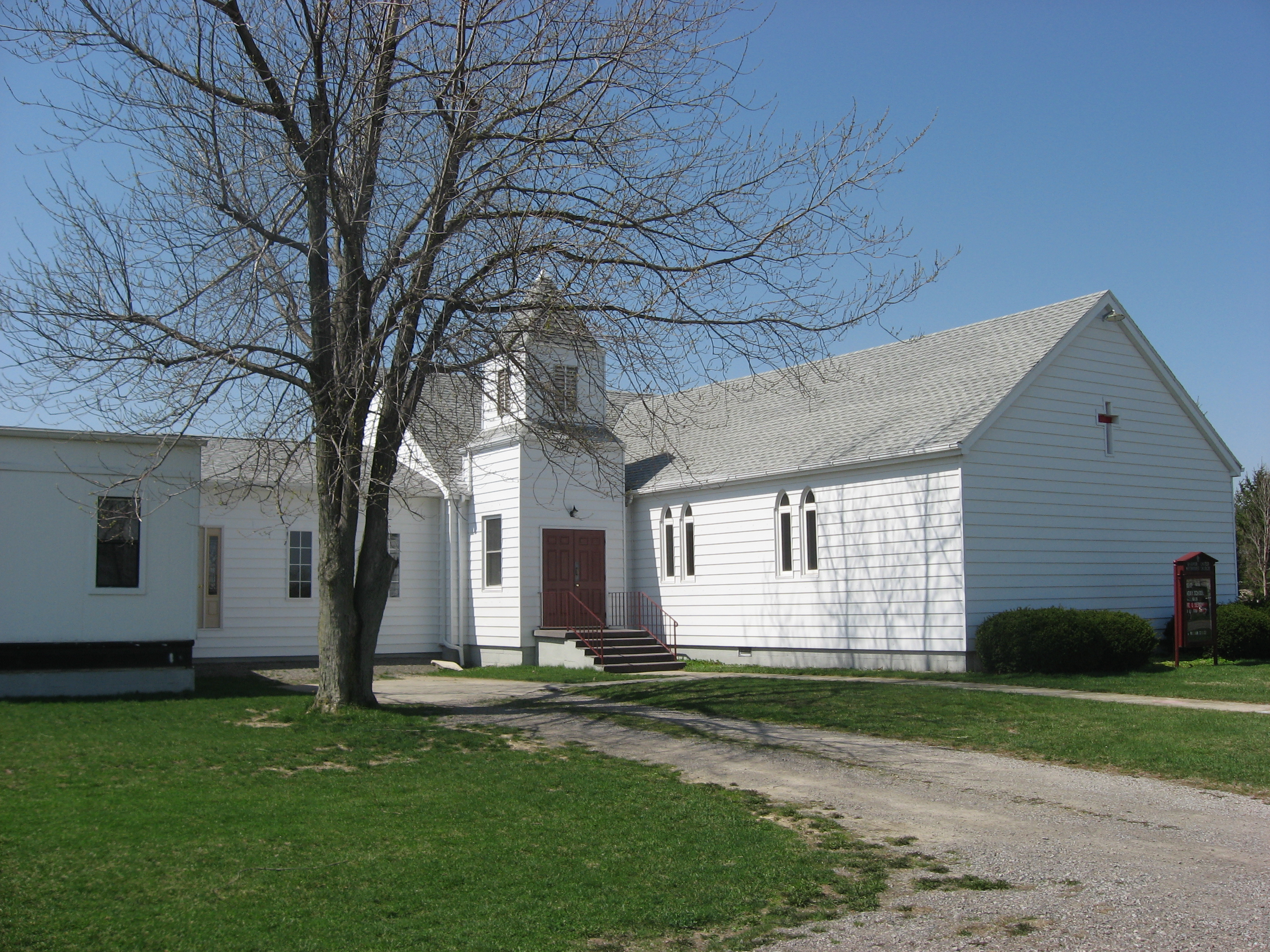
Harper Community Church

Harper is an unincorporated community in Logan County, in the U.S. state of Ohio.

== History ==
Harper was laid out in 1851 around the time the railroad was extended to that point. A post office called Harper was established in 1856, and remained in operation until 1934.
