= East Liberty Auto Plant =

Automobile plant in Marysville, Ohio, US

Honda East Liberty Auto Plant
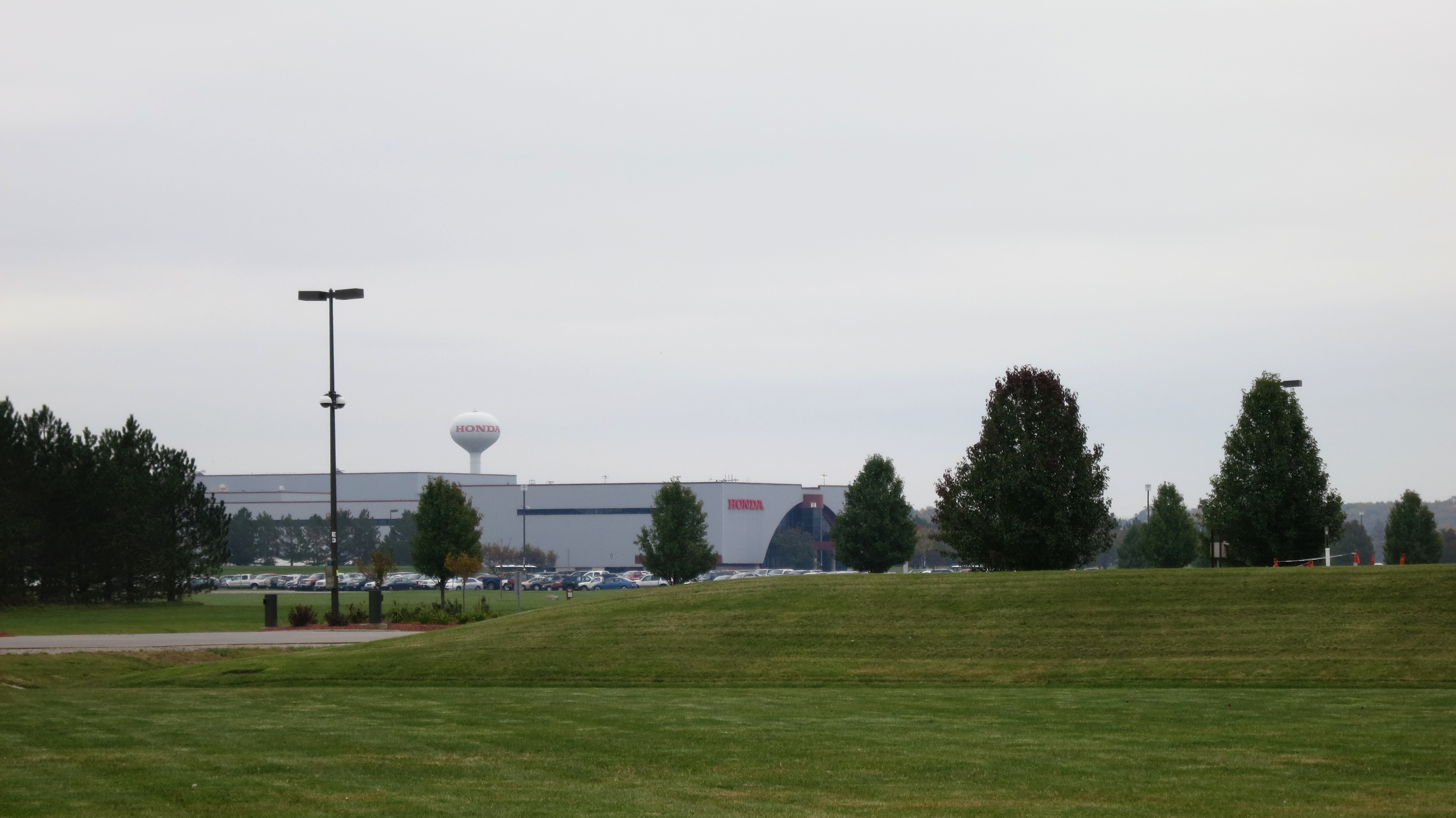
- The Honda East Liberty Auto Plant as seen from Ohio State Route 347.
- Operated: December 1989
- Location: East Liberty, Ohio, United States
- Coordinates: 40°19′45″N 83°33′00″W
- Industry: Automotive
- Products: Honda CR-V; Acura MDX; Acura RDX
- Employees: 2,800
- Volume: 1,900,000 sq ft (180,000 m^{2})
- Owner: Honda
- Website: ohio.honda.com

East Liberty Auto Plant is a Honda automobile factory in East Liberty, Ohio, United States. The assembly plant opened in 1989. East Liberty is about 45 minutes northwest of Columbus, Ohio.

It was the first plant in North America to implement Honda’s 'New Manufacturing System' in 2000. Today, the plant produces the Honda CR-V and Acura MDX. The East Liberty Auto Plant was the first plant on the continent to employ low-emission, water-borne paint and the first to use laser welding in mass production.

The East Liberty plant became the lead plant in global production of the CR-V in 2016. Engineers working in the plant are responsible for providing the first set of hard-tooled parts and complete body unit builds for nine other CR-V plants around the world to follow and replicate. The team have to perfect the parts and manufacturing processes. The plant's 200,000-square-foot welding shop was expanded and underwent a makeover with 200 new robots. The plant began to produce the 2017 CR-V in November 2016. The plant has around 2,800 employees.

== Products ==
Annual production capacity: 240,000 cars and light trucks

- Honda CR-V (September 2006–present)
- Acura MDX (May 2017–present)
- Operations:
  - Stamping
  - Welding
  - Painting
  - Testing
  - Milking
  - Plastics injection molding
  - Assembly and sub-assembly
  - Quality assurance
  - Shipping & export
  - Stamped parts exported to Honda of Canada Manufacturing for Civic production

== Former products ==
- Honda Civic (1995–2005)
- Honda Crosstour (2009–2015)
- Honda Element (2003–2011)
- Acura CL (1997–1999)
- Acura RDX (2012–2026)
- Afeela 1 (2026, cancelled)

== See also ==
- List of Honda facilities
- Marysville Auto Plant
- Japanese community of Columbus, Ohio
