= New Jerusalem, California =

New Jerusalem, California may refer to:

- New Jerusalem, former name of El Rio, California
- New Jerusalem, former name of Petrolia, California

== See also ==
- New Jerusalem Airport
