= Ohio State Route 532 =

State highway in northeastern Ohio, US

State Route 532

Route information
- Maintained by ODOT
- Length: 3.68 mi (5.92 km)
- Existed: 1937–present

Major junctions
- South end: US 224 / CR 5 in Springfield Township/Suffield Township
- North end: I-76 in Tallmadge

Location
- Country: United States
- State: Ohio
- Counties: Summit, Portage

Highway system
- Ohio State Highway System; Interstate; US; State; Scenic
← SR 531	→ SR 533

State Route 532 (SR 532) is a north–south state highway in the northeastern portion of the U.S. state of Ohio. The highway runs from its southern terminus at a signalized intersection with U.S. Route 224 (US 224) on the Summit–Portage county line approximately 0.75 miles (1.21 km) south of Mogadore on the border of Springfield Township and Suffield Township to its northern terminus at a diamond interchange with Interstate 76 (I-76), at its exit 29 within the Tallmadge city limits.

SR 532 was established in the late 1930s. Once a connector route that linked Akron to SR 8, the route is now merely a short connector linking I-76 to US 224. The portion of SR 532 that was removed from the state highway system continues from I-76 to the center of Tallmadge as Southeast Avenue. The route straddles the Summit–Portage county line from its southern terminus to where it bends into Summit County near the northern village limits of Mogadore.

== Route description ==
This state highway is not included as a component of the National Highway System, a system of routes identified as being most important for the economy, mobility and defense of the country.

== History ==
The SR 532 designation was established in 1937. Originally, the highway began at the intersection of Canton Road, at the time a segment of SR 8, and Tisen Road south of Mogadore. It followed Tisen Road east to where it turns north on the Summit–Portage county line and defaults into Portage Line Road, continuing north from that point up to US 224. SR 532 then utilized its entire present alignment, continuing northwest of where the I-76 interchange is located today along Southeast Avenue up to the downtown Tallmadge traffic circle. It continued from there northwest along Northwest Avenue and Tallmadge Road to the present SR 59 intersection, which at the time was a part of SR 5, in Cuyahoga Falls. SR 532 ran concurrent with SR 5 along Front Street northeast. Departing from SR 5, SR 532 traveled north out of Cuyahoga Falls by following Bailey Road to the northwest and the north, then turning to the southwest on Graham Road and traveling along that road a short distance to Wyoga Lake Road. The route then went north along Wyoga Lake Road to where it meets Akron-Cleveland Road, which in 1937 was a part of SR 8. That intersection marked the endpoint of SR 532.

The shortening of SR 532 began in 1942, when the portions of the highway south of US 224 along Tisen Road and Portage Line Road were removed from the state highway system. Then, by 1981, with the impending completion of the SR 8 freeway in the vicinity of Cuyahoga Falls, all of SR 532 to the northwest of I-76 through Tallmadge and Cuyahoga Falls was eliminated. Consequently, at that point the state highway took on the status of short connector route between US 224 and I-76 that it has today.

== Major intersections ==
County	Location	mi	km	Destinations	Notes
Summit–Portage county line	Springfield–Suffield township line	0.00	0.00	US 224 / CR 5 (Portage Line Road) – Canfield, Barberton	
Summit	Tallmadge	3.68	5.92	I-76 / Southeast Avenue – Akron, Youngstown	Exit 29 (I-76)
1.000 mi = 1.609 km; 1.000 km = 0.621 mi
