= Valley Hi, Ohio =

- Village
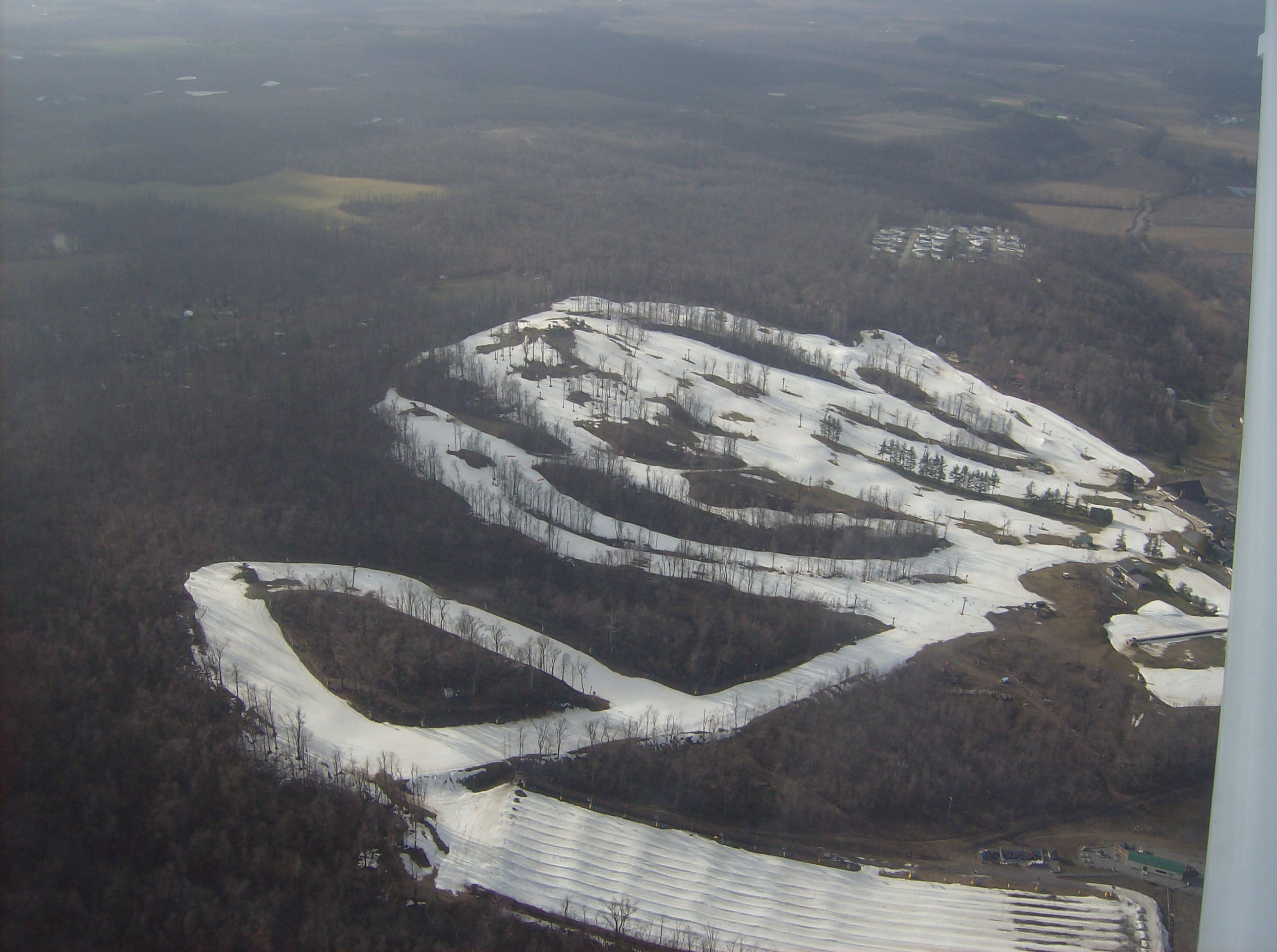
- Mad River Mountain, with subdivisions in the hills above

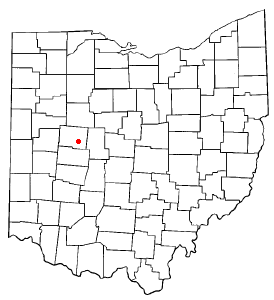
- Location of Valley Hi, Ohio

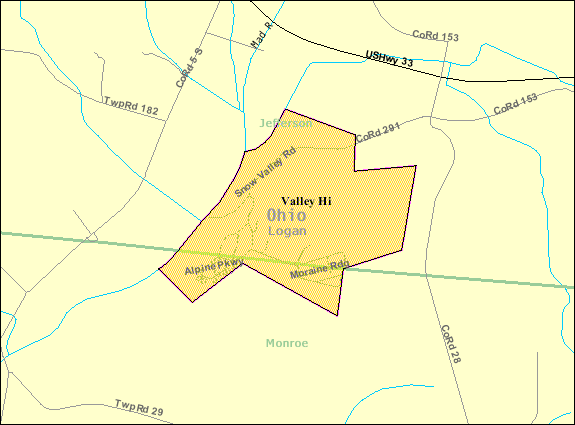
- Detailed map of Valley Hi
- Coordinates: 40°18′58″N 83°40′33″W
- Country: United States
- State: Ohio
- County: Logan
- Townships: Jefferson, Monroe

Area
  - Total: 0.62 sq mi (1.61 km^{2})
  - Land: 0.62 sq mi (1.61 km^{2})
  - Water: 0 sq mi (0.00 km^{2})
- Elevation: 1,227 ft (374 m)

Population (2020)
  - Total: 228
  - Density: 367/sq mi (141.6/km^{2})
- Time zone: UTC-5 (Eastern (EST))
  - Summer (DST): UTC-4 (EDT)
- FIPS code: 39-79226
- GNIS feature ID: 2400039

Valley Hi is a village in Logan County, Ohio, United States. The population was 228 at the 2020 census. The village is located nearby U.S. Route 33 and is about an hour northwest of Columbus. The village lies mostly in Jefferson Township, but its southernmost portion extends into Monroe Township.

== Geography ==
Valley Hi has a total area of 0.62 square miles (1.61 km^{2}), all of it land. The village is located in an area with some of the steepest terrain in normally flat Western Ohio and serves as home to the Mad River Mountain ski area.

== Demographics ==
Historical population
Census	Pop.	Note	%±
1970	15		—
1980	60		300.0%
1990	217		261.7%
2000	244		12.4%
2010	212		−13.1%
2020	228		7.5%
U.S. Decennial Census

=== 2010 census ===
As of the census of 2010, there were 212 people, 87 households, and 53 families residing in the village. The population density was 341.9 inhabitants per square mile (132.0/km^{2}). There were 165 housing units at an average density of 266.1 per square mile (102.7/km^{2}). The racial makeup of the village was 95.8% White, 1.4% African American, 0.9% Native American, 0.5% from other races, and 1.4% from two or more races. Hispanic or Latino of any race were 3.3% of the population.

There were 87 households, of which 36.8% had children under the age of 18 living with them, 37.9% were married couples living together, 13.8% had a female householder with no husband present, 9.2% had a male householder with no wife present, and 39.1% were non-families. 29.9% of all households were made up of individuals, and 4.6% had someone living alone who was 65 years of age or older. The average household size was 2.44 and the average family size was 2.94.

The median age in the village was 32 years. 25.9% of residents were under the age of 18; 12.3% were between the ages of 18 and 24; 28.8% were from 25 to 44; 26.4% were from 45 to 64; and 6.6% were 65 years of age or older. The gender makeup of the village was 51.9% male and 48.1% female.

=== 2000 census ===
As of the census of 2000, there were 244 people, 97 households, and 65 families residing in the village. The population density was 370.4 inhabitants per square mile (143.0/km^{2}). There were 113 housing units at an average density of 171.5 per square mile (66.2/km^{2}). The racial makeup of the village was 97.95% White, 0.41% Native American, 0.41% Pacific Islander, and 1.23% from two or more races. Hispanic or Latino of any race were 0.82% of the population.

There were 97 households, out of which 39.2% had children under the age of 18 living with them, 50.5% were married couples living together, 10.3% had a female householder with no husband present, and 32.0% were non-families. 23.7% of all households were made up of individuals, and 2.1% had someone living alone who was 65 years of age or older. The average household size was 2.52 and the average family size was 2.98.

In the village, the population was spread out, with 28.3% under the age of 18, 11.9% from 18 to 24, 37.3% from 25 to 44, 16.4% from 45 to 64, and 6.1% who were 65 years of age or older. The median age was 30 years. For every 100 females, there were 106.8 males. For every 100 females age 18 and over, there were 118.8 males.

The median income for a household in the village was $43,125, and the median income for a family was $46,364. Males had a median income of $32,350 versus $26,250 for females. The per capita income for the village was $17,077. About 3.7% of families and 4.7% of the population were below the poverty line, including 4.1% of those under the age of eighteen and none of those 65 or over.

== Transportation ==
Due to its location at the top of the ridgeline, Valley Hi contains only a few winding streets. Moreover, it is not as easily accessed as some nearby towns, as the only road into the village is County Road 291. The nearest highway is U.S. Route 33, which is accessed by an interchange less than a mile from the village.
