= East Liberty, Ohio =

- Census-designated place
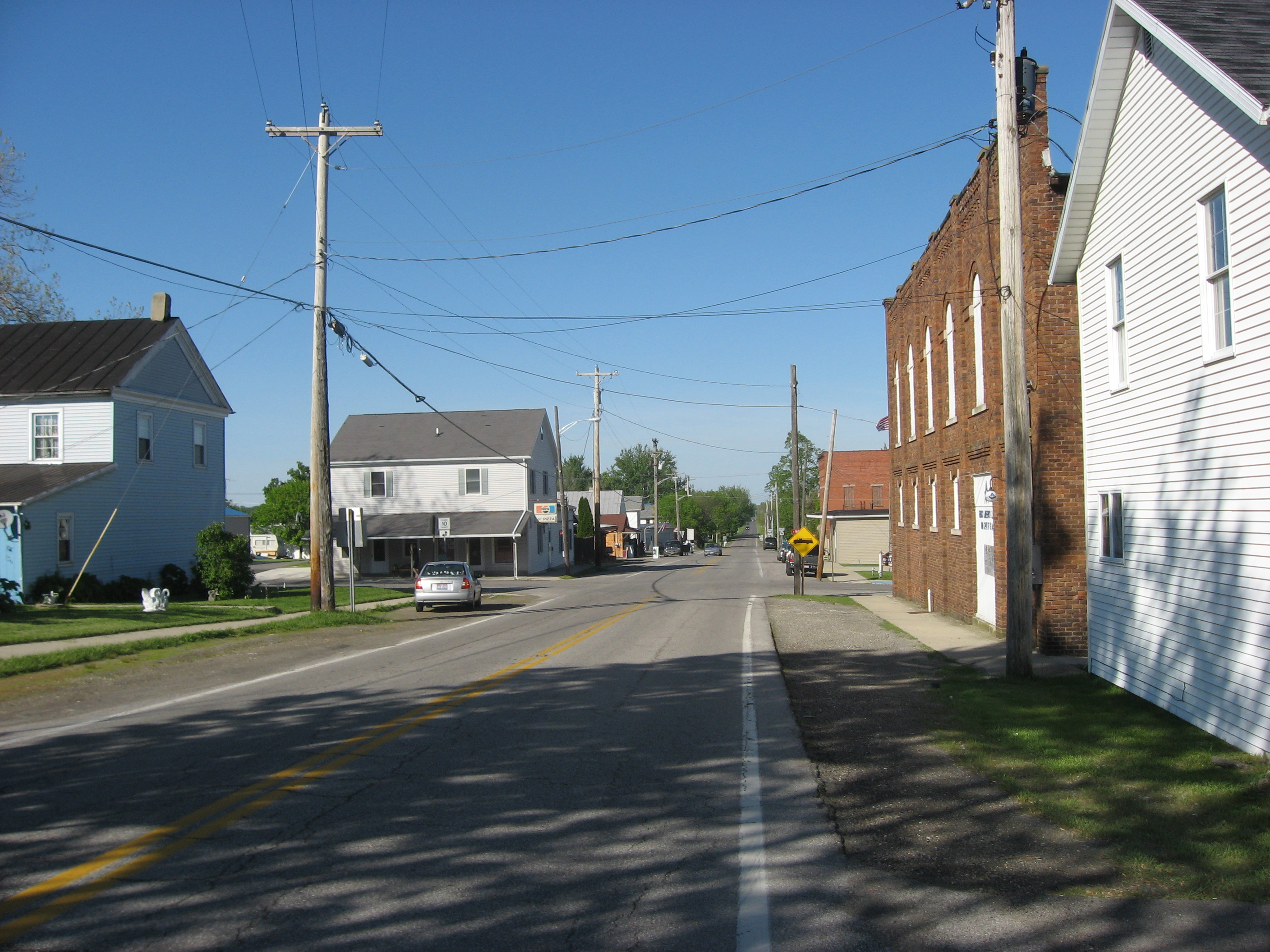
- Buildings in central East Liberty

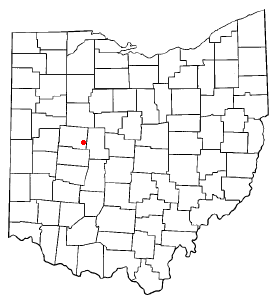
- Location of East Liberty, Ohio
- Coordinates: 40°20′02″N 83°35′06″W
- Country: United States
- State: Ohio
- County: Logan
- Township: Perry

Area
  - Total: 1.58 sq mi (4.09 km^{2})
  - Land: 1.58 sq mi (4.09 km^{2})
  - Water: 0 sq mi (0.00 km^{2})
- Elevation: 1,119 ft (341 m)

Population (2020)
  - Total: 371
  - Density: 235/sq mi (90.8/km^{2})
- Time zone: UTC-5 (Eastern (EST))
  - Summer (DST): UTC-4 (EDT)
- ZIP code: 43319
- FIPS code: 39-23702
- GNIS feature ID: 2628888

East Liberty is an unincorporated community and census-designated place (CDP) located in Perry Township, Logan County, Ohio, United States. As of the 2020 census, it had a population of 371. It is located just off U.S. Route 33, 10 miles (16 km) east of Bellefontaine and 46 miles (74 km) northwest of Columbus. It has a post office with the ZIP code 43319.

East Liberty was platted in 1834. A post office has been in operation at East Liberty since 1836. A Disciples of Christ minister, Alonzo Skidmore, organized the Central Ohio College at East Liberty in 1882. Formally established in the following year, it prospered before financial pressures forced its closure in the late 1890s.

The community is the location of a major Honda automotive production plant, East Liberty Auto Plant (opened in 1989), as well as the NHTSA's Vehicle Research and Testing Center, located at the independent proving ground Transportation Research Center.

Besides U.S. Route 33, significant roads in East Liberty include State Routes 292 and 347.

== Geography ==
East Liberty is located in southern Perry Township at 40°18'27.6" North, 83°35'10.4" West (40.307682, -83.586221). According to the U.S. Census Bureau, the CDP has an area of 1.6 square miles (4.1 km^{2}), all of it recorded as land. Otter Creek flows through the southern part of the community, leading northeast to Mill Creek, an east-flowing tributary of the Scioto River.

== Demographics ==
Historical population
Census	Pop.	Note	%±
2020	371		—
U.S. Decennial Census
