= Ohio State Route 540 =

State highway in Logan County, Ohio, US

State Route 540

Route information
- Maintained by ODOT
- Length: 8.72 mi (14.03 km)
- Existed: 1937–present

Major junctions
- West end: US 68 / SR 47 in Bellefontaine
- US 33 in Bellefontaine
- East end: SR 292 near West Mansfield

Location
- Country: United States
- State: Ohio
- Counties: Logan

Highway system
- Ohio State Highway System; Interstate; US; State; Scenic
← SR 539	→ SR 541

State Route 540 (SR 540) is an east–west state highway in the western portion of the U.S. state of Ohio. SR 540 has its western terminus in downtown Bellefontaine at a signalized intersection with U.S. Route 68 (US 68) and SR 47. Its eastern terminus is at a T-intersection with SR 292 approximately 3.50 miles (5.63 km) southwest of West Mansfield.

== Route description ==
The entirety of SR 540 is situated within the eastern portion of Logan County. There are no stretches of SR 540 that are included within the National Highway System (NHS). The NHS is a network of routes identified as being most important for the nation's economy, mobility and defense.

== History ==
The SR 540 designation was assigned in 1937. Originally, the highway was routed along the portion of its current alignment from its intersection with County Road 25 (CR 25) about 2 miles (3.2 km) east of Bellefontaine to its present eastern terminus at SR 292. In 1937, CR 25, along with SR 540 between CR 25 and downtown Bellfontaine, was a part of SR 32, which would become US 33 one year later.

By 1964, US 33 was routed onto its current alignment around the east side of Bellefontaine. Consequently, the former portion of US 33 from the previous western terminus of SR 540 west into downtown Bellefontaine became a westward extension of SR 540 which resulted in the highway taking on its present shape.

== Major intersections ==
The entire route is in Logan County.

Location	mi	km	Destinations	Notes
Bellefontaine	0.00	0.00	US 68 / SR 47 west (North Main Street / Sandusky Avenue)	Western end of US 68 / SR 47 concurrency
Bellefontaine	0.10	0.16	US 68 / SR 47 east (North Madriver Street)	Eastern end of US 68 / SR 47 concurrency
Bellefontaine	1.61	2.59	US 33 – Columbus, Fort Wayne	Interchange
Perry Township	8.72	14.03	SR 292 – Ridgeway, West Liberty	
1.000 mi = 1.609 km; 1.000 km = 0.621 mi: Concurrency terminus
