= Mad River Mountain =

Ski resort in Ohio, United States

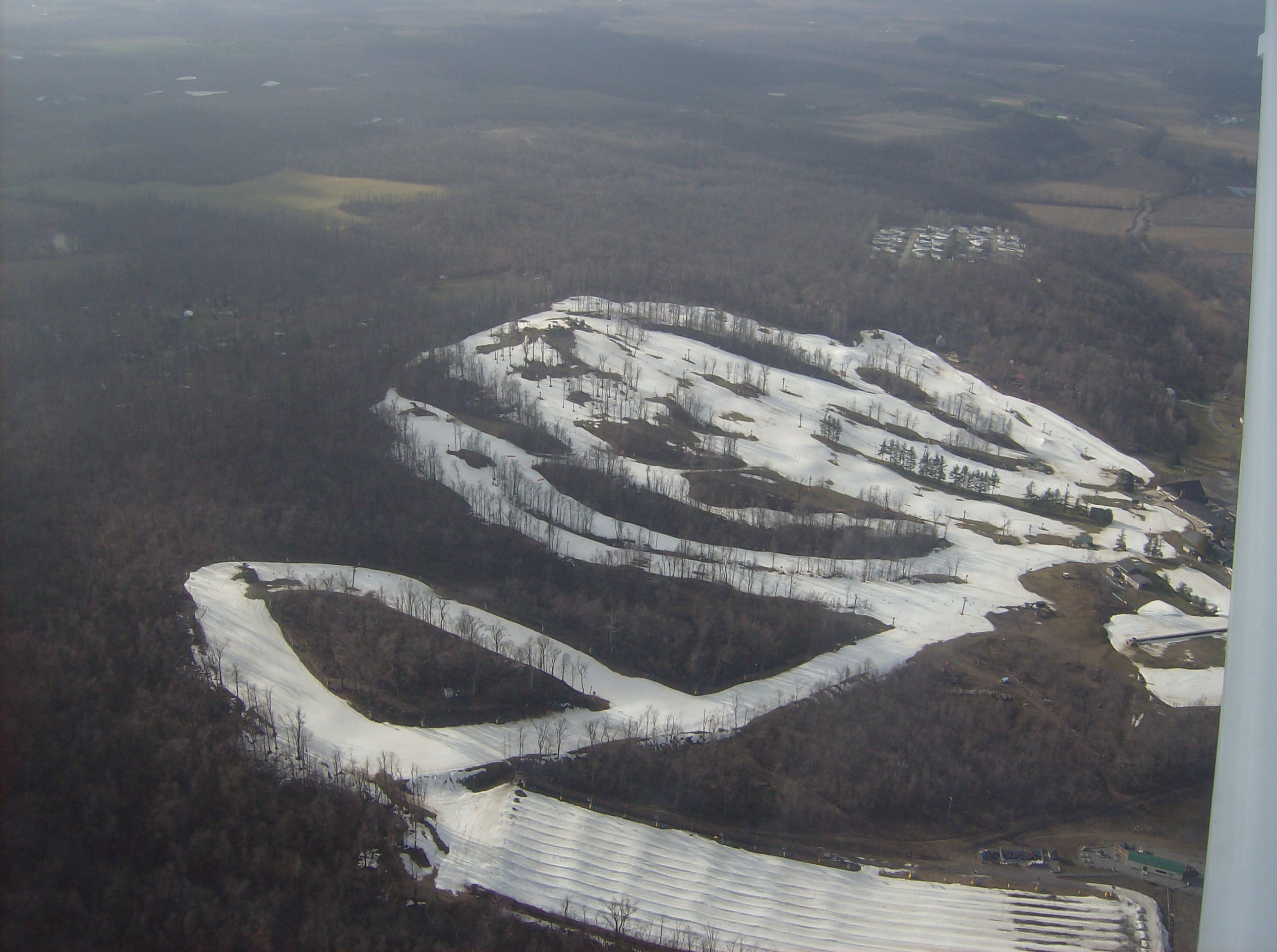
- Aerial view of Mad River Mountain from the east
- Interactive map of Mad River Mountain
- Location: Valley Hi, Ohio (Jefferson Township, Logan County, Ohio)
- Nearest city: Bellefontaine, Ohio
- Coordinates: 40°18′58.74″N 83°40′50.03″W
- Top elevation: 1,460 feet (450 m)
- Base elevation: 1,160 feet (350 m)
- Skiable area: 144 acres (0.58 km^{2})
- Trails: 20
- Longest run: .5 miles (0.80 km)
- Lift system: 11
- Snowfall: 36 inches (91 cm)
- Website: SkiMadRiver.com

Mad River Mountain is a ski and snowboard resort in Valley Hi, Ohio, United States. The elevation of Mad River Mountain is 1,460 feet (450 m) with a vertical drop of 300 ft (91 m), and it has a ski season that runs from approximately mid-December through mid-March. The resort, which opened in 1962 as Valley Hi Ski Area, is owned by EPR Properties and operated by Vail Resorts, who bought the resort from Peak Resorts in 2019.

There are 20 trails of various skill levels, a tubing park, two terrain parks, and two beginner areas. Of the resort's 11 total lifts, there are 6 surface lifts, 3 double chair lifts, 1 triple chair lift, and 1 fixed quad lift. Since the annual natural snowfall averages only 36 inches (91 cm), Mad River Mountain has the largest snow making system in Ohio, with 130 snow cannons that cover all of its trails.

The resort lies off U.S. Route 33 east of the city of Bellefontaine. It is located 6 miles (9.7 km) southeast of Campbell Hill, Ohio's highest point, and it is near the source of the Mad River. The resort's iconic bar venue called 'The Loft' caught fire on September 16, 2015, and was considered a total loss. Local firm Thomas & Marker Construction was chosen to prepare the resort for the 2015-2016 winter season. The site was demolished and temporary structures were erected in October 2015. A new lodge has been constructed.

== Notable employees ==
In the early 1980s Olympic medalist Putzi Frandl was employed as a ski instructor at the resort. Louie Vito, Olympic snowboard medalist got his start at Mad River Mountain, and sponsors a rail jam and food drive for a local pantry each year.
