= Bokescreek Township, Ohio =

Township in Ohio, US

Bokescreek Township, Logan County, Ohio
- Township
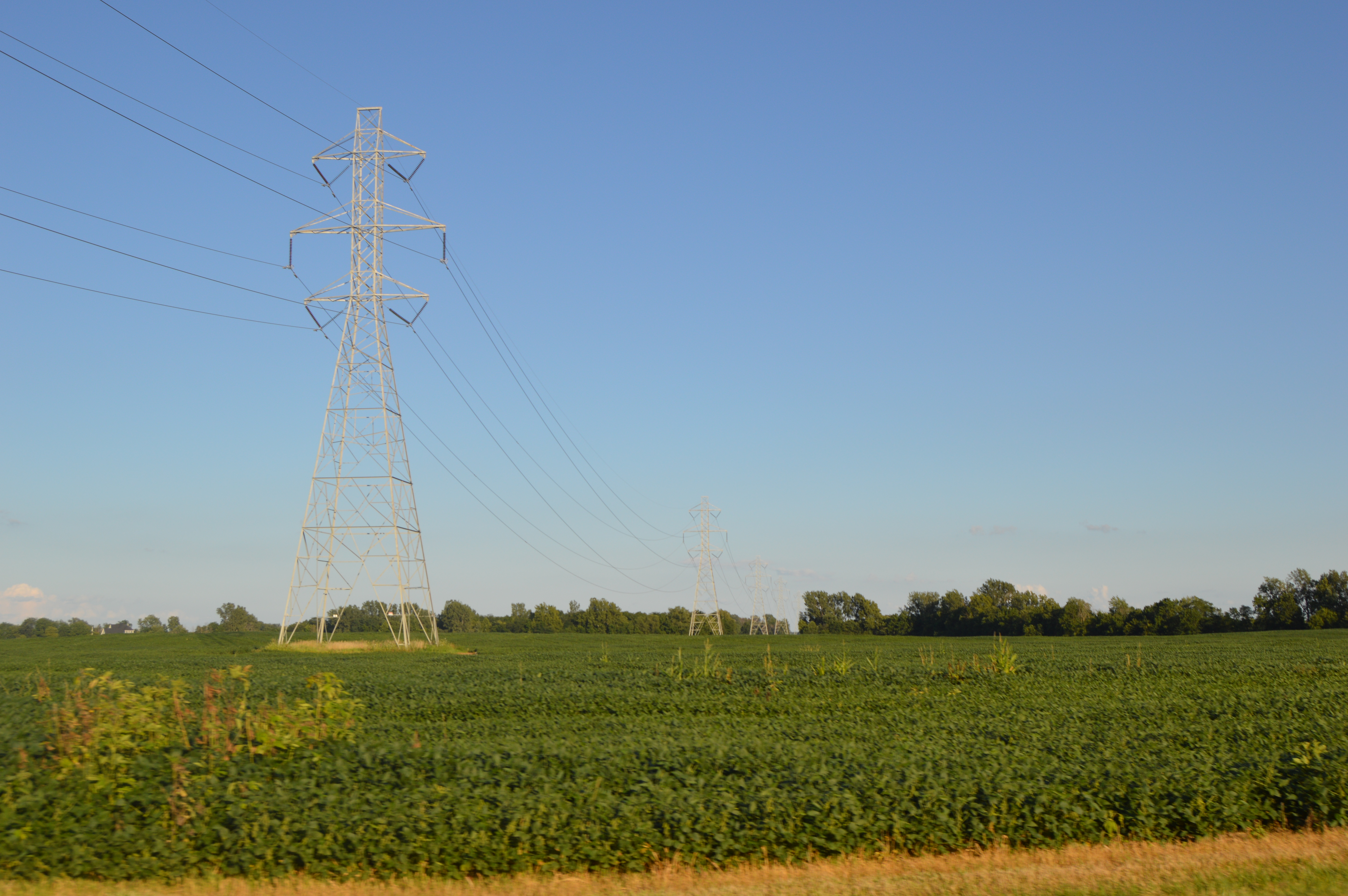
- Fields south of Ridgeway

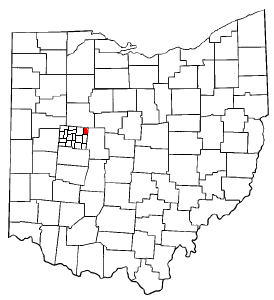
- Location of Bokescreek Township in Ohio

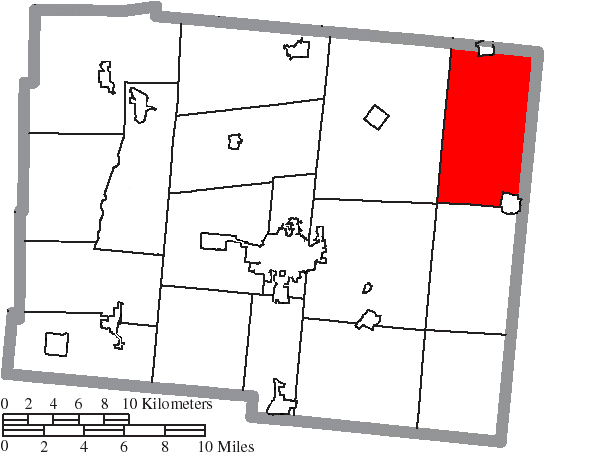
- Location of Bokescreek Township in Logan County
- Coordinates: 40°27′13″N 83°33′39″W
- Country: United States
- State: Ohio
- County: Logan

Area
  - Total: 33.87 sq mi (87.71 km^{2})
  - Land: 33.86 sq mi (87.69 km^{2})
  - Water: 0.0077 sq mi (0.02 km^{2})
- Elevation: 1,079 ft (329 m)

Population (2020)
  - Total: 1,374
  - Density: 40.58/sq mi (15.67/km^{2})
- Time zone: UTC-5 (Eastern (EST))
  - Summer (DST): UTC-4 (EDT)
- Area codes: 937, 326
- FIPS code: 39-07552
- GNIS feature ID: 1086482

Bokescreek Township or Bokes Creek Township is one of the seventeen townships of Logan County, Ohio, United States. As of the 2020 census, the population was 1,374.

== Geography ==
Located in the northeastern corner of the county, it borders the following townships:

- Hale Township, Hardin County - north
- Washington Township, Union County - northeast
- York Township, Union County - southeast
- Perry Township - south
- Rushcreek Township - west
- Taylor Creek Township, Hardin County - northwest

Parts of the villages of West Mansfield and Ridgeway are located in southeastern and northern Bokescreek Township respectively.

== Name and history ==
Bokescreek Township was formed in 1837 from Perry Township, and named after Bokes Creek. It is the only Bokescreek Township statewide.

== Government ==
The township is governed by a three-member board of trustees, who are elected in November of odd-numbered years to a four-year term beginning on the following January 1. Two are elected in the year after the presidential election and one is elected in the year before it. There is also an elected township fiscal officer, who serves a four-year term beginning on April 1 of the year after the election, which is held in November of the year before the presidential election. Vacancies in the fiscal officership or on the board of trustees are filled by the remaining trustees.

== Transportation ==
State Routes 47 and 292 pass through Bokescreek Township.
