= White Town, Ohio =

Coordinates: 40°30′15″N 83°41′42″W

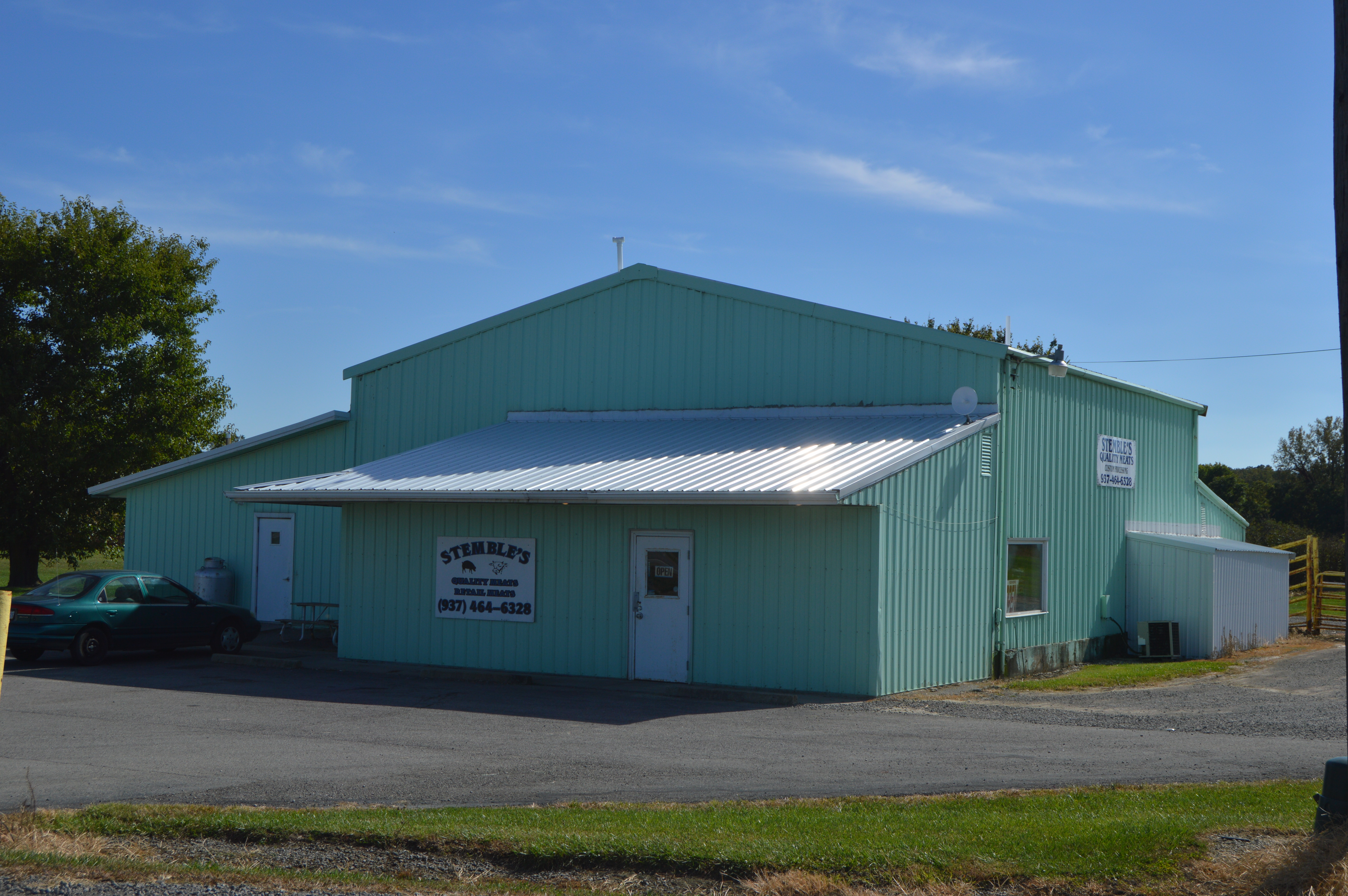
A butcher shop is the only building at the townsite

White Town is a ghost town in Rushcreek Township, Logan County, Ohio. It was located in Rushcreek Township.

== History ==
White Town was laid out in 1832 by William White, and named for him.
