= West Mansfield, Ohio =

West Mansfield
- Village
- Village of West Mansfield
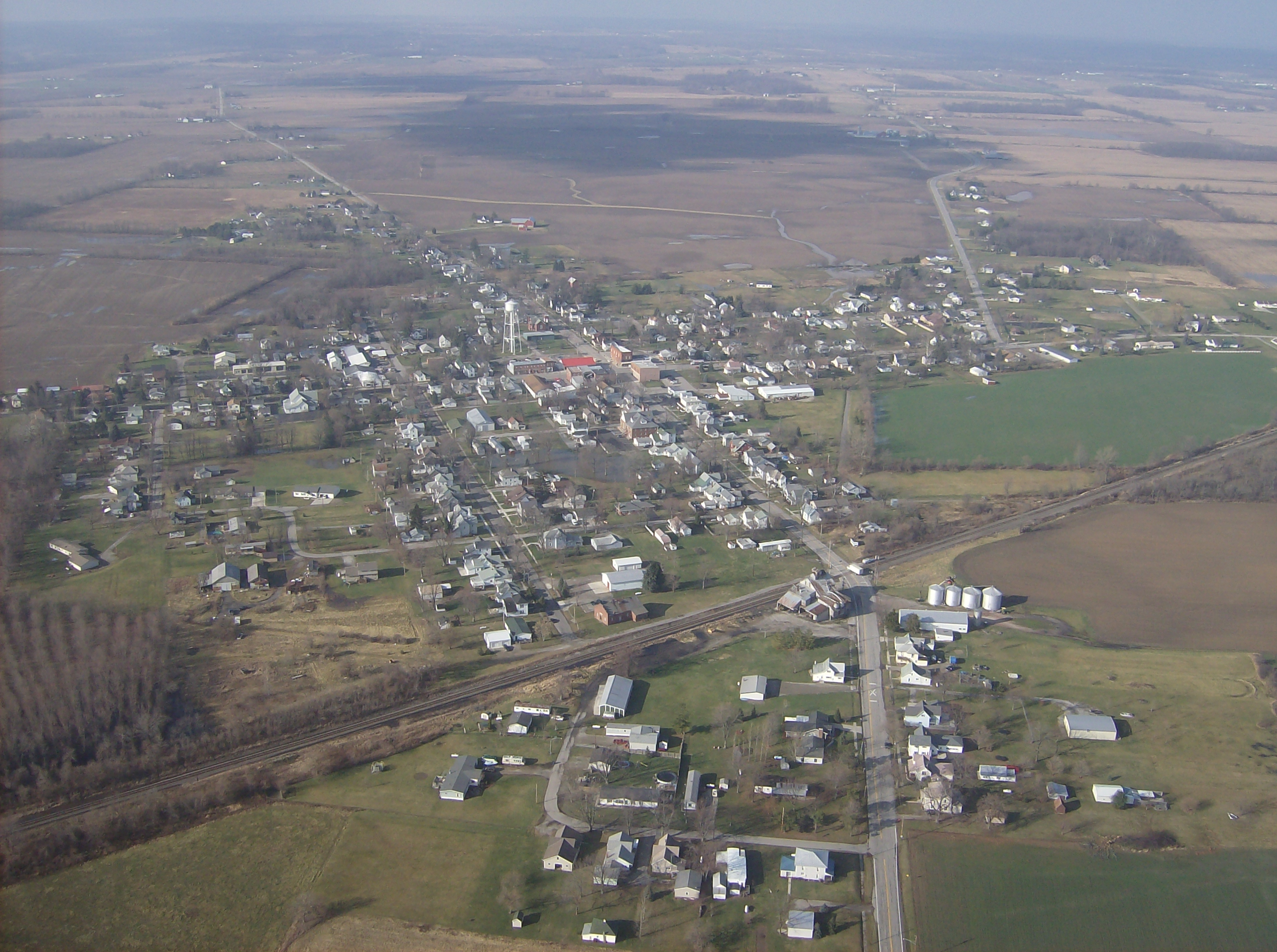
- Aerial view of West Mansfield from the east

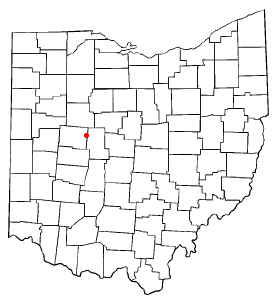
- Location of West Mansfield, Ohio

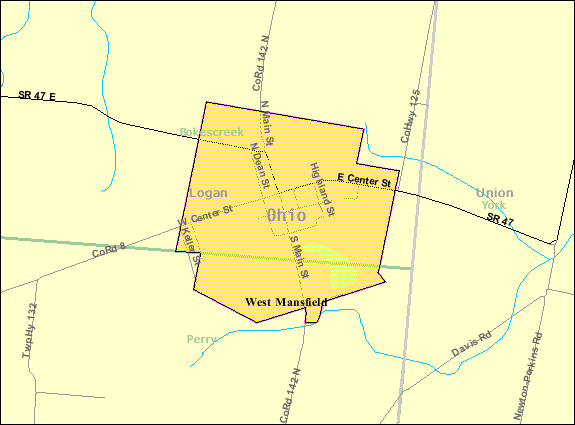
- Detailed map of West Mansfield
- Coordinates: 40°24′2″N 83°32′40″W
- Country: United States
- State: Ohio
- Counties: Logan
- Townships: Bokescreek, Perry

Area
  - Total: 0.86 sq mi (2.22 km^{2})
  - Land: 0.83 sq mi (2.16 km^{2})
  - Water: 0.023 sq mi (0.06 km^{2})
- Elevation: 1,083 ft (330 m)

Population (2020)
  - Total: 749
  - Density: 899.8/sq mi (347.42/km^{2})
- Time zone: UTC-5 (Eastern (EST))
  - Summer (DST): UTC-4 (EDT)
- ZIP code: 43358
- Area codes: 937, 326
- FIPS code: 39-83818
- GNIS feature ID: 2400138
- Website: westmansfield.net

West Mansfield (officially the Village of West Mansfield) is a village located in Logan County, Ohio, United States. The population was 749 at the 2020 census.

A branch of the Logan County District Library serves the West Mansfield community.

== History ==
West Mansfield was laid out in 1848. A post office called West Mansfield has been in operation since 1863.

== Geography ==
According to the United States Census Bureau, the village has a total area of 0.86 square miles (2.23 km^{2}), of which, 0.83 square miles (2.15 km^{2}) is land and 0.03 square miles (0.08 km^{2}) is water.

== Demographics ==
Historical population
Census	Pop.	Note	%±
1880	333		—
1890	431		29.4%
1900	875		103.0%
1910	913		4.3%
1920	737		−19.3%
1930	675		−8.4%
1940	739		9.5%
1950	756		2.3%
1960	791		4.6%
1970	753		−4.8%
1980	716		−4.9%
1990	830		15.9%
2000	700		−15.7%
2010	682		−2.6%
2020	749		9.8%
U.S. Decennial Census

=== 2010 census ===
As of the census of 2010, there were 682 people, 271 households, and 190 families living in the village. The population density was 821.7 inhabitants per square mile (317.3/km^{2}). There were 309 housing units at an average density of 372.3 per square mile (143.7/km^{2}). The racial makeup of the village was 96.6% White, 0.9% African American, 0.1% Native American, 0.1% Asian, and 2.2% from two or more races. Hispanic or Latino of any race were 0.1% of the population.

There were 271 households, of which 38.0% had children under the age of 18 living with them, 52.0% were married couples living together, 12.2% had a female householder with no husband present, 5.9% had a male householder with no wife present, and 29.9% were non-families. 24.7% of all households were made up of individuals, and 9.3% had someone living alone who was 65 years of age or older. The average household size was 2.52 and the average family size was 2.99.

The median age in the village was 36 years. 26.2% of residents were under the age of 18; 7.1% were between the ages of 18 and 24; 27.3% were from 25 to 44; 24.8% were from 45 to 64; and 14.5% were 65 years of age or older. The gender makeup of the village was 50.0% male and 50.0% female.

=== 2000 census ===
As of the census of 2000, there were 700 people, 276 households, and 203 families living in the village. The population density was 848.8 inhabitants per square mile (327.7/km^{2}). There were 295 housing units at an average density of 357.7 per square mile (138.1/km^{2}). The racial makeup of the village was 97.71% White, 0.14% African American, 0.14% Asian, 0.14% Pacific Islander, 0.29% from other races, and 1.57% from two or more races. Hispanic or Latino of any race were 0.29% of the population.

There were 276 households, out of which 31.9% had children under the age of 18 living with them, 58.3% were married couples living together, 12.3% had a female householder with no husband present, and 26.1% were non-families. 23.6% of all households were made up of individuals, and 11.2% had someone living alone who was 65 years of age or older. The average household size was 2.54 and the average family size was 3.01.

In the village, the population was spread out, with 26.6% under the age of 18, 8.4% from 18 to 24, 29.6% from 25 to 44, 21.4% from 45 to 64, and 14.0% who were 65 years of age or older. The median age was 36 years. For every 100 females, there were 82.3 males. For every 100 females age 18 and over, there were 88.3 males.

The median income for a household in the village was $41,731, and the median income for a family was $51,544. Males had a median income of $35,250 versus $22,143 for females. The per capita income for the village was $18,353. About 2.5% of families and 3.4% of the population were below the poverty line, including 3.3% of those under age 18 and 8.6% of those age 65 or over.

== Government ==
In the elections of November 2007, Edward Evans was elected mayor without opposition, and Sue Carpenter and Valerie Stanley were elected to the village council. Beverly Woodrum defeated Stacy Weiser for the position of clerk-treasurer.

== Transportation ==
State Route 47 is a primary street in West Mansfield, transversing the village's downtown from east to west.
