= Logan County, Ohio =

County in Ohio, United States

- County
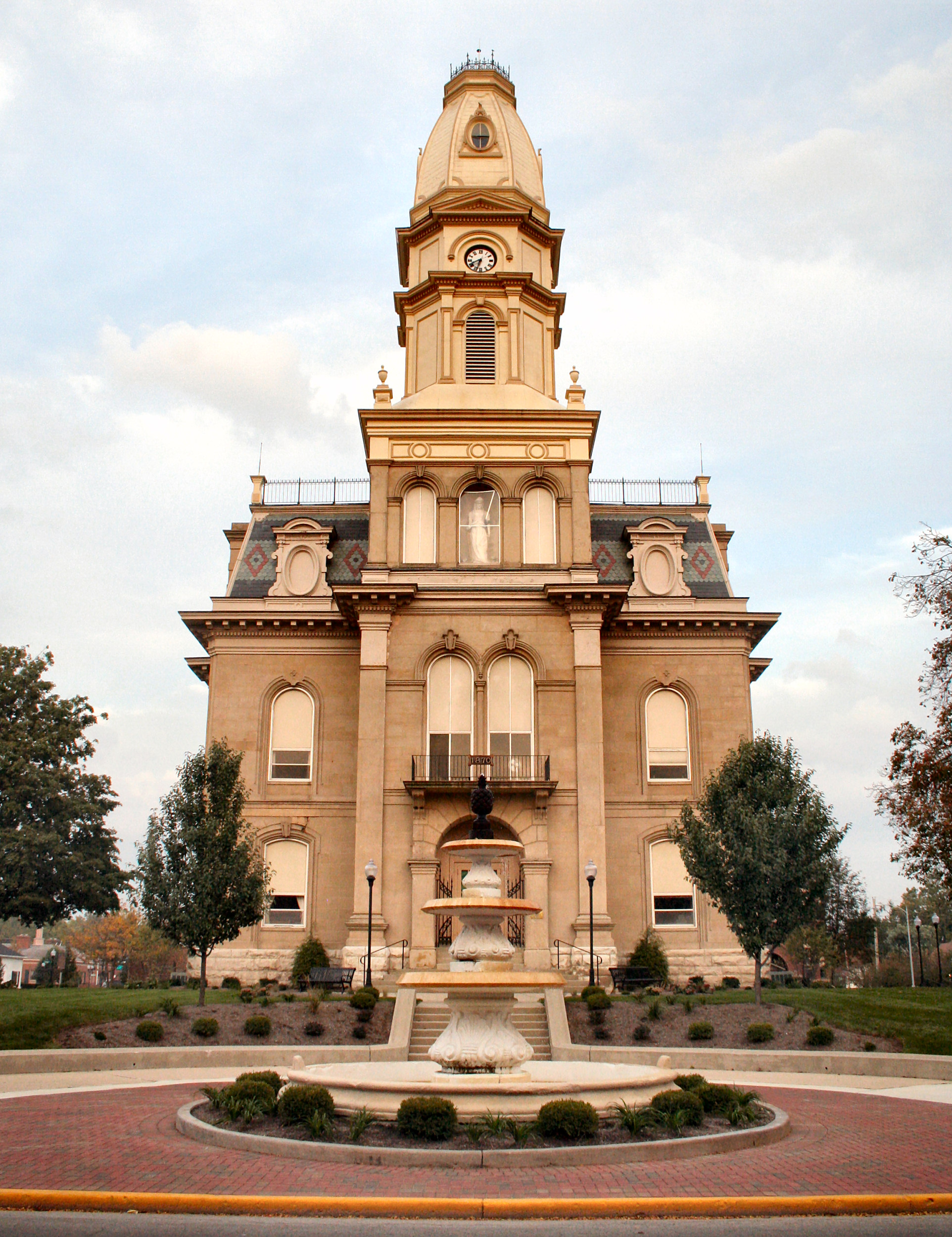
- Logan County Courthouse

- Flag Seal

- Location within the U.S. state of Ohio
- Coordinates: 40°23′N 83°46′W
- Country: United States
- State: Ohio
- Founded: March 1, 1818
- Named for: Benjamin Logan
- Seat: Bellefontaine
- Largest city: Bellefontaine

Area
  - Total: 467 sq mi (1,210 km^{2})
  - Land: 458 sq mi (1,190 km^{2})
  - Water: 8.3 sq mi (21 km^{2}) 1.8%

Population (2020)
  - Total: 46,150
  - Estimate (2025): 46,302 ▲
  - Density: 100.6/sq mi (38.8/km^{2})
- Time zone: UTC−5 (Eastern)
  - Summer (DST): UTC−4 (EDT)
- Congressional district: 4th
- Website: www.logancountyohio.gov

Logan County is a county in the west central portion of the U.S. state of Ohio. As stated in the 2025 QuickFacts, the population was 46,302. The county seat is Bellefontaine. The county is named for Benjamin Logan, who fought Native Americans in the area. Logan County comprises the Bellefontaine, Ohio Micropolitan Statistical Area, which is also included in the Columbus-Marion-Zanesville, Ohio Combined Statistical Area.

== Geography ==
According to the U.S. Census Bureau, the county has an area of 467 square miles (1,210 km^{2}), of which 458 square miles (1,190 km^{2}) is land and 8.3 square miles (21 km^{2}) (1.8%) is water. Campbell Hill, the highest natural point in Ohio at 1,549 feet (472 m), is northeast of Bellefontaine.

=== Adjacent counties ===
- Hardin County (north)
- Union County (east)
- Champaign County (south)
- Shelby County (west)
- Auglaize County (northwest)

=== Major highways ===
- U.S. Route 33
- U.S. Route 68
- State Route 47
- State Route 117
- State Route 235
- State Route 245
- State Route 273
- State Route 274
- State Route 287
- State Route 292
- State Route 347
- State Route 365
- State Route 366
- State Route 368
- State Route 508
- State Route 533
- State Route 540
- State Route 559
- State Route 706
- State Route 708
- State Route 720

== Demographics ==
Historical population
Census	Pop.	Note	%±
1820	3,159		—
1830	6,440		103.9%
1840	14,015		117.6%
1850	19,162		36.7%
1860	20,996		9.6%
1870	23,028		9.7%
1880	26,267		14.1%
1890	27,386		4.3%
1900	30,420		11.1%
1910	30,084		−1.1%
1920	30,104		0.1%
1930	28,981		−3.7%
1940	29,624		2.2%
1950	31,329		5.8%
1960	34,803		11.1%
1970	35,072		0.8%
1980	39,155		11.6%
1990	42,310		8.1%
2000	46,005		8.7%
2010	45,858		−0.3%
2020	46,150		0.6%
2025 (est.)	46,302	▲	0.3%
U.S. Decennial Census; 1790-1960 1900-1990; 1990-2000 2020

=== 2020 census ===
As of the 2020 census, the county had a population of 46,150. The median age was 42.9 years. 22.4% of residents were under the age of 18 and 19.5% of residents were 65 years of age or older. For every 100 females there were 97.4 males, and for every 100 females age 18 and over there were 96.2 males age 18 and over.

The racial makeup of the county was 91.1% White, 1.5% Black or African American, 0.2% American Indian and Alaska Native, 0.7% Asian, <0.1% Native Hawaiian and Pacific Islander, 1.0% from some other race, and 5.5% from two or more races. Hispanic or Latino residents of any race comprised 2.2% of the population.

44.4% of residents lived in urban areas, while 55.6% lived in rural areas.

There were 19,062 households in the county, of which 28.0% had children under the age of 18 living in them. Of all households, 49.0% were married-couple households, 18.7% were households with a male householder and no spouse or partner present, and 24.0% were households with a female householder and no spouse or partner present. About 28.6% of all households were made up of individuals and 12.9% had someone living alone who was 65 years of age or older.

There were 23,657 housing units, of which 19.4% were vacant. Among occupied housing units, 73.0% were owner-occupied and 27.0% were renter-occupied. The homeowner vacancy rate was 1.3% and the rental vacancy rate was 5.7%.

=== Racial and ethnic composition ===
Logan County, Ohio – Racial and ethnic composition Note: the US Census treats Hispanic/Latino as an ethnic category. This table excludes Latinos from the racial categories and assigns them to a separate category. Hispanics/Latinos may be of any race.
Race / Ethnicity (NH = Non-Hispanic)	Pop 1980	Pop 1990	Pop 2000	Pop 2010	Pop 2020	% 1980	% 1990	% 2000	% 2010	% 2020
White alone (NH)	38,175	41,046	44,047	43,385	41,749	97.50%	97.01%	95.74%	94.61%	90.46%
Black or African American alone (NH)	711	798	778	728	673	1.82%	1.89%	1.69%	1.59%	1.46%
Native American or Alaska Native alone (NH)	30	58	87	102	83	0.08%	0.14%	0.19%	0.22%	0.18%
Asian alone (NH)	59	234	181	238	327	0.15%	0.55%	0.39%	0.52%	0.71%
Native Hawaiian or Pacific Islander alone (NH)	x	x	12	16	11	x	x	0.03%	0.03%	0.02%
Other race alone (NH)	32	15	27	40	181	0.08%	0.04%	0.06%	0.09%	0.39%
Mixed race or Multiracial (NH)	x	x	541	810	2,122	x	x	1.18%	1.77%	4.60%
Hispanic or Latino (any race)	148	159	332	539	1,004	0.38%	0.38%	0.72%	1.18%	2.18%
Total	39,155	42,310	46,005	45,858	46,150	100.00%	100.00%	100.00%	100.00%	100.00%

=== 2010 census ===
As of the 2010 United States census, there were 45,858 people, 18,111 households, and 12,569 families living in the county. The population density was 100.0 inhabitants per square mile (38.6/km^{2}). There were 23,181 housing units at an average density of 50.6 units per square mile (19.5 units/km^{2}). The racial makeup of the county was 95.3% white, 1.6% black or African American, 0.5% Asian, 0.3% American Indian, 0.3% from other races, and 1.9% from two or more races. Those of Hispanic or Latino origin made up 1.2% of the population. In terms of ancestry, 30.9% were German, 13.5% were Irish, 11.5% were American, and 9.1% were English.

Of the 18,111 households, 32.9% had children under the age of 18 living with them, 53.9% were married couples living together, 10.5% had a female householder with no husband present, 30.6% were non-families, and 25.5% of all households were made up of individuals. The average household size was 2.51 and the average family size was 2.98. The median age was 39.9 years.

The median income for a household in the county was $46,493 and the median income for a family was $53,601. Males had a median income of $42,702 versus $29,537 for females. The per capita income for the county was $22,974. About 11.0% of families and 14.8% of the population were below the poverty line, including 25.3% of those under age 18 and 7.1% of those age 65 or over.

=== 2000 census ===
As of the census of 2000, there were 46,005 people, 17,956 households, and 12,730 families living in the county. The population density was 100 inhabitants per square mile (39/km^{2}). There were 21,571 housing units at an average density of 47 units per square mile (18/km^{2}). The racial makeup of the county was 96.15% White, 1.71% Black or African American, 0.20% Native American, 0.40% Asian, 0.03% Pacific Islander, 0.27% from other races, and 1.24% from two or more races. 0.72% of the population were Hispanic or Latino of any race. 96.8% spoke English, 1.0% German and 1.0% Spanish as their first language.

There were 17,956 households, out of which 33.30% had children under the age of 18 living with them, 57.00% were married couples living together, 9.50% had a female householder with no husband present, and 29.10% were non-families. 24.80% of all households were made up of individuals, and 10.30% had someone living alone who was 65 years of age or older. The average household size was 2.53 and the average family size was 3.01.

In the county, the population was spread out, with 26.70% under the age of 18, 8.20% from 18 to 24, 27.90% from 25 to 44, 23.30% from 45 to 64, and 13.90% who were 65 years of age or older. The median age was 37 years. For every 100 females there were 96.10 males. For every 100 females age 18 and over, there were 93.60 males.

The median income for a household in the county was $41,479, and the median income for a family was $47,516. Males had a median income of $37,134 versus $24,739 for females. The per capita income for the county was $18,984. About 7.10% of families and 9.30% of the population were below the poverty line, including 11.80% of those under age 18 and 8.50% of those age 65 or over.

== Politics ==
Logan County is a strongly Republican county, having backed Democratic Party presidential nominees only twice since 1856, in 1912 and 1964.

United States presidential election results for Logan County, Ohio
Year	Republican		Democratic		Third party(ies)	
Year	No.	%	No.	%	No.	%
1856	2,093	56.75%	1,328	36.01%	267	7.24%
1860	2,415	59.28%	1,542	37.85%	117	2.87%
1864	2,637	61.86%	1,626	38.14%	0	0.00%
1868	2,778	61.08%	1,770	38.92%	0	0.00%
1872	2,795	58.74%	1,955	41.09%	8	0.17%
1876	3,259	57.98%	2,286	40.67%	76	1.35%
1880	3,739	59.16%	2,468	39.05%	113	1.79%
1884	3,998	58.83%	2,625	38.63%	173	2.55%
1888	4,115	59.34%	2,533	36.52%	287	4.14%
1892	3,796	57.85%	2,332	35.54%	434	6.61%
1896	4,722	59.56%	3,125	39.42%	81	1.02%
1900	4,806	60.38%	2,951	37.08%	202	2.54%
1904	4,994	69.21%	1,939	26.87%	283	3.92%
1908	4,756	58.44%	3,186	39.15%	196	2.41%
1912	1,977	27.07%	2,727	37.34%	2,600	35.60%
1916	4,345	54.80%	3,483	43.93%	101	1.27%
1920	8,521	63.21%	4,904	36.38%	56	0.42%
1924	7,186	61.03%	3,176	26.97%	1,412	11.99%
1928	9,602	76.63%	2,858	22.81%	71	0.57%
1932	7,469	52.04%	6,678	46.53%	205	1.43%
1936	8,363	52.58%	7,353	46.23%	189	1.19%
1940	9,861	60.83%	6,351	39.17%	0	0.00%
1944	9,882	66.65%	4,944	33.35%	0	0.00%
1948	8,118	61.01%	5,149	38.70%	38	0.29%
1952	11,084	69.81%	4,793	30.19%	0	0.00%
1956	11,229	72.66%	4,226	27.34%	0	0.00%
1960	11,311	68.18%	5,279	31.82%	0	0.00%
1964	6,683	44.06%	8,484	55.94%	0	0.00%
1968	8,362	56.12%	4,889	32.81%	1,648	11.06%
1972	10,938	71.12%	3,786	24.62%	656	4.27%
1976	9,092	59.03%	5,949	38.62%	361	2.34%
1980	9,727	64.87%	4,319	28.80%	948	6.32%
1984	12,230	76.54%	3,645	22.81%	104	0.65%
1988	11,099	70.71%	4,484	28.57%	114	0.73%
1992	9,364	49.84%	4,889	26.02%	4,534	24.13%
1996	8,325	48.56%	6,397	37.31%	2,423	14.13%
2000	11,849	64.20%	5,945	32.21%	661	3.58%
2004	14,471	67.63%	6,825	31.90%	102	0.48%
2008	13,848	62.15%	7,936	35.61%	499	2.24%
2012	13,633	64.31%	7,062	33.31%	504	2.38%
2016	15,957	73.49%	4,647	21.40%	1,108	5.10%
2020	17,964	76.74%	5,055	21.59%	390	1.67%
2024	18,182	77.33%	5,027	21.38%	303	1.29%

United States Senate election results for Logan County, Ohio1
Year	Republican		Democratic		Third party(ies)	
Year	No.	%	No.	%	No.	%
2024	16,763	71.77%	5,614	24.03%	981	4.20%

== Government ==
- Commissioners: Mark Robinson (R), Joe Antram (R), Mike Yoder (R)
- Auditor: Jack Reser (R)
- Clerk of Courts: Barb McDonald (R)
- Recorder: Pat Myers (R) (appointed July 2, 2013)
- Treasurer: Rhonda Stafford (R)
- Prosecuting Attorney: Eric Stewart (R)
- Sheriff: Randall J. Dodds (R)
- Engineer: Scott Coleman (R)
- Coroner: John C. O'Connor (R)
- Judge Court of Common Pleas: Kevin P. Braig (R)
- Judge Court of Common Pleas Probate/Juvenile Division: Kim Kellogg-Martin (R)
- Judge Court of Common Pleas Domestic Relations-Juv.-Probate Division: Natasha Kennedy (R)
- Judge Municipal Court: Jacob Estes (R)

== Communities ==
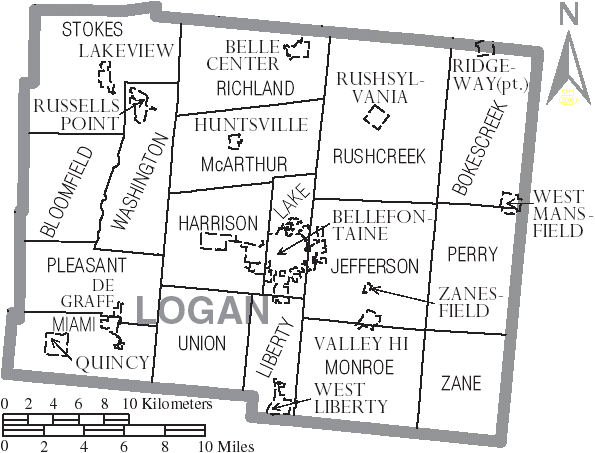
Map of Logan County with municipalities and townships

=== City ===
- Bellefontaine (county seat)

=== Villages ===
- Belle Center
- De Graff
- Huntsville
- Lakeview
- Quincy
- Ridgeway
- Rushsylvania
- Russells Point
- Valley Hi
- West Liberty
- West Mansfield
- Zanesfield

=== Townships ===
- Bloomfield
- Bokes Creek
- Harrison
- Jefferson
- Lake
- Liberty
- McArthur
- Miami
- Monroe
- Perry
- Pleasant
- Richland
- Rushcreek
- Stokes
- Union
- Washington
- Zane

=== Census-designated places ===
- Chippewa Park
- East Liberty
- Lewistown

=== Unincorporated communities ===
- Big Springs
- Bloom Center
- Cherokee
- Flatwoods
- Gretna
- Harper
- Horton
- Logansville
- McKees Town
- Middleburg
- New Jerusalem
- New Richland
- North Greenfield
- Northwood
- Orchard Island
- Pickrelltown
- Santa Fe
- Walnut Grove
- White Town

== Notable people ==
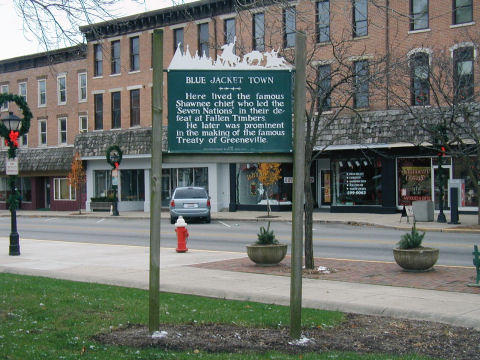
Historical marker in downtown Bellefontaine marking the site of Blue Jacket's Town

- George Bartholomew - inventor of concrete pavement
- Blue Jacket (Weyapiersenwah) - Shawnee chief
- Bethany Dillon - singer; nominee for 2004 Gospel Music Association New Artist of the Year award
- Allan W. Eckert - author
- Jim Flora - artist
- Melville J. Herskovits - anthropologist
- Kin Hubbard - cartoonist and journalist
- Samuel Johnston - professional wrestler
- Edward D. Jones - investment banker
- Austin Eldon Knowlton - architect
- William Lawrence - Republican politician involved with the attempt to impeach Andrew Johnson, creating the United States Department of Justice, helping to create the American Red Cross, and ratifying the Geneva Convention
- The Mills Brothers - entertainers
- Raymond Stanton Patton (1882–1937), rear admiral and first flag officer of the United States Coast and Geodetic Survey Corps and second Director of the United States Coast and Geodetic Survey (1929–1937)
- Norman Vincent Peale - minister and author

== See also ==
- National Register of Historic Places listings in Logan County, Ohio
