= New Jerusalem Airport =

Airport in California, United States of America

New Jerusalem Airport New Jerusalem Auxiliary Airfield
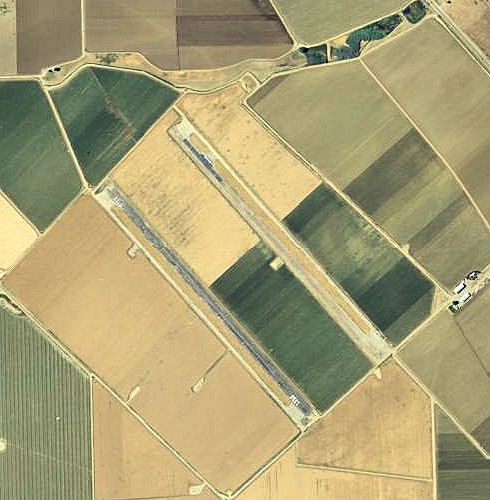
- 2006 USGS airphoto
- IATA: none; ICAO: none; FAA LID: 1Q4

Summary
- Airport type: Public
- Owner: City of Tracy
- Serves: Tracy, California
- Elevation AMSL: 62 ft / 19 m
- Coordinates: 37°40′40″N 121°18′04″W

Map
- Location of New Jerusalem Airport

Runways
Direction	Length		Surface
Direction	ft	m	Surface
12/30	3,530	1,076	Asphalt

Statistics (2020)
- Aircraft operations (year ending 2/13/2020): 4,000
- Source: Federal Aviation Administration

New Jerusalem Airport (FAA LID: 1Q4) is a non-towered, public airport located seven nautical miles (8.1 miles; 13 km) southeast of the central business district of Tracy, a city in San Joaquin County, California, United States. It is owned by the City of Tracy.

== Facilities and aircraft ==
New Jerusalem Airport covers an area of 394 acres (159 ha) at an elevation of 62 feet (19 m) above mean sea level. It has one runway designated 12/30 with an asphalt surface measuring 3,530 by 60 feet (1,076 by 18 m). A second, parallel runway was built initially but fell into disrepair and is not used by general aviation.

For the 12-month period ending February 13, 2020, the airport had 4,000 general aviation aircraft operations, an average of 77 per week. Due to the airport's lack of hangars, there were no aircraft based at this airport as of February 2020.

== History ==
The airport takes its name from the locale near New Jerusalem Elementary School. In 1874, local pioneer Henry Ebe, whose family were Dunkard Brethren, donated the land for the school, stipulating that it take that name.

=== World War II ===
During World War II, the airport was designated as New Jerusalem Auxiliary Airfield (No 2), and was an auxiliary training airfield for Stockton Army Airfield, California.

=== In media ===
In 1989, the airport was used as a filming location for the Steven Spielberg film Always. Miniature radio-controlled planes were used by Industrial Light and Magic to create special effects for aerial firefighting scenes.

The airport was used in several episodes of the Discovery Channel television show MythBusters, including "Duct Tape Plane".

== See also ==
- California World War II Army Airfields
