= Ohio State Route 47 =

State highway in Ohio, US

State Route 47

Route information
- Maintained by ODOT
- Length: 105.23 mi (169.35 km)
- Existed: 1933–present

Major junctions
- West end: SR 32 in Union City
- US 127 near Dawn; I-75 near Sidney; US 68 in Bellefontaine
- East end: SR 98 / SR 423 in Waldo

Location
- Country: United States
- State: Ohio
- Counties: Darke, Shelby, Logan, Union, Delaware, Marion

Highway system
- Ohio State Highway System; Interstate; US; State; Scenic
← SR 46	→ SR 48
← US 68	SR 68	→ SR 69

State Route 47 (SR 47) is a state highway running from the Indiana border at Union City to Waldo, about ten miles (16 km) south of Marion. In Bellefontaine, State Route 47 follows the path of different streets (even though neither are one-way) from Main Street and Sandusky Avenue to the intersection just north of Mary Rutan Hospital, about one-half mile north of the Main-Sandusky intersection. The westbound portion of State Route 47 goes down Main, while the eastbound portion goes north on Madriver Street during this stretch. Nobody really knows why the route was designated this way when none of the streets involved are one-way. It was State Route 68 until 1933, when U.S. Route 68 was commissioned. Since both roads run through a common county in Ohio (Logan), and also since there is a rule that there can be no Ohio State Routes with the same number as US highways within Ohio, the number was changed to 47.

== Route description ==
The portion of SR 47 between SR 49 and US 127, near Ansonia in Darke County, is designated "Pfc. Douglas E. Dickey Memorial Highway", in honor of a United States Marine and Darke County native who was mortally wounded in combat on March 26, 1967, in Vietnam, and who posthumously received the Medal of Honor for heroism.

== History ==
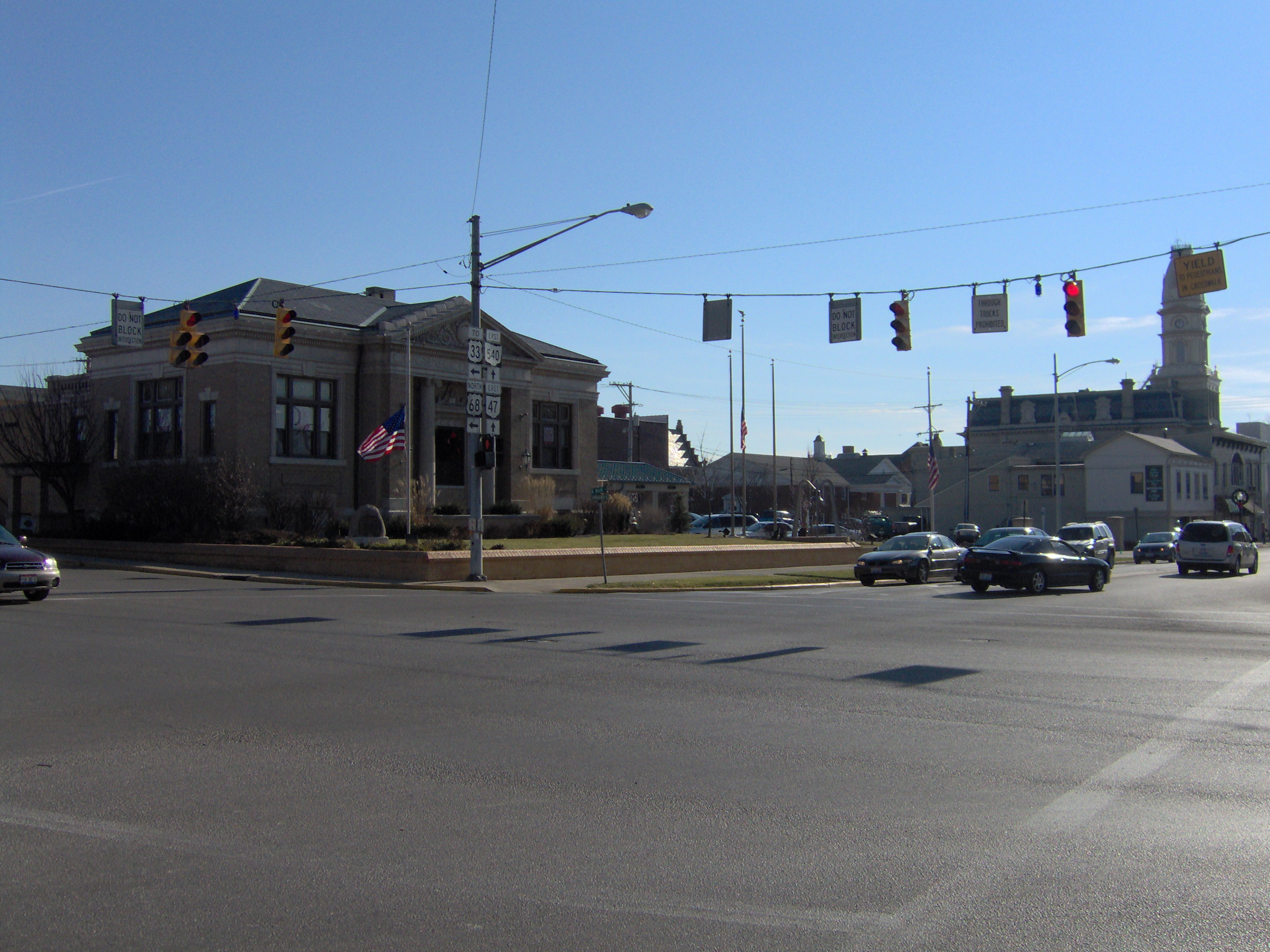
Intersection of Main Street and Sandusky Avenue in downtown Bellefontaine, Ohio

== Major intersections ==
County	Location	mi	km	Destinations	Notes
Darke	Union City	0.00	0.00	SR 32 (West Pearl Street) / State Line Road	Indiana state line
Darke	Brown Township	7.64	12.30	SR 49 – Fort Recovery, Greenville	
Darke	Ansonia	10.51	16.91	SR 118 (Main Street)	
Darke	Richland–York township line	13.88	22.34	US 127 – Celina, Greenville	
Darke	Versailles	18.54	29.84	SR 185 north (Greenlawn Avenue)	Western end of SR 185 concurrency
Darke	Versailles	18.80	30.26	SR 121 south (West Street) / SR 185 south / Main Street	Northern terminus of SR 121; eastern end of SR 185 concurrency
Shelby	Cynthian Township	27.73	44.63	SR 66 – Fort Loramie, Piqua	
Shelby	Sidney	37.78– 37.89	60.80– 60.98	I-75 – Dayton, Toledo	Exit 92 (I-75)
Shelby	Sidney	39.26	63.18	SR 29 (Ohio Avenue)	Western end of SR 29 westbound concurrency
Shelby	Sidney	39.35	63.33	SR 29 east (East Court Street) / South Main Avenue	Eastern end of SR 29 westbound concurrency; western end of SR 29 eastbound concurrency
Shelby	Sidney	39.52	63.60	SR 29 west (North Main Avenue) / East North Street	Eastern end of SR 29 eastbound concurrency
Shelby	Salem Township	47.37	76.23	SR 65 north – Jackson Center	Southern terminus of SR 65
Logan	Pleasant Township	56.13	90.33	SR 235 – Lakeview, De Graff	
Logan	Bellefontaine	64.20	103.32	US 68 south (Canby Street)	Western end of US 68 southbound concurrency
Logan	Bellefontaine	64.30	103.48	US 68 north (Main Street) / SR 540 begins	Eastern end of US 68 northbound concurrency; western end of US 68 southbound concurrency; western terminus of SR 540
Logan	Bellefontaine	64.40	103.64	US 68 east (Madriver Street) / SR 540 (Sandusky Avenue)	Eastern end of US 68 southbound concurrency; eastern end of SR 540 concurrency
Logan	Bokes Creek Township	74.22	119.45	SR 292 – Ridgeway, East Liberty	
Union	York Township	83.46	134.32	SR 739	
Union	York Township	85.69	137.90	SR 31 – Kenton, Marysville	
Union	Richwood	92.26	148.48	SR 37 south (Franklin Street) / Ottawa Street	Western end of SR 37 concurrency
Union	Richwood	92.33	148.59	SR 37 north (Franklin Street) / Blagrove Street	Eastern end of SR 37 concurrency
Delaware	Thompson Township	96.07	154.61	SR 4 south – Marysville	Western end of SR 4 concurrency
Marion	Gast Corner	96.74	155.69	SR 4 north – Marion	Eastern end of SR 4 concurrency
Marion	Prospect Township–Prospect municipal line	98.21	158.05	SR 257 south (Prospect Dublin Road)	Northern terminus of SR 257
Marion	Prospect	98.44	158.42	SR 203 (Main Street)	
Marion	Waldo Township	104.46	168.11	SR 229 east	Western terminus of SR 229
Marion	Waldo	105.23	169.35	SR 98 north to US 23 / SR 423 north – Bucyrus, Marion	Southern termini of SR 98 and SR 423
1.000 mi = 1.609 km; 1.000 km = 0.621 mi: Concurrency terminus
