= Jefferson Township, Logan County, Ohio =

Township in Ohio, US

- Township
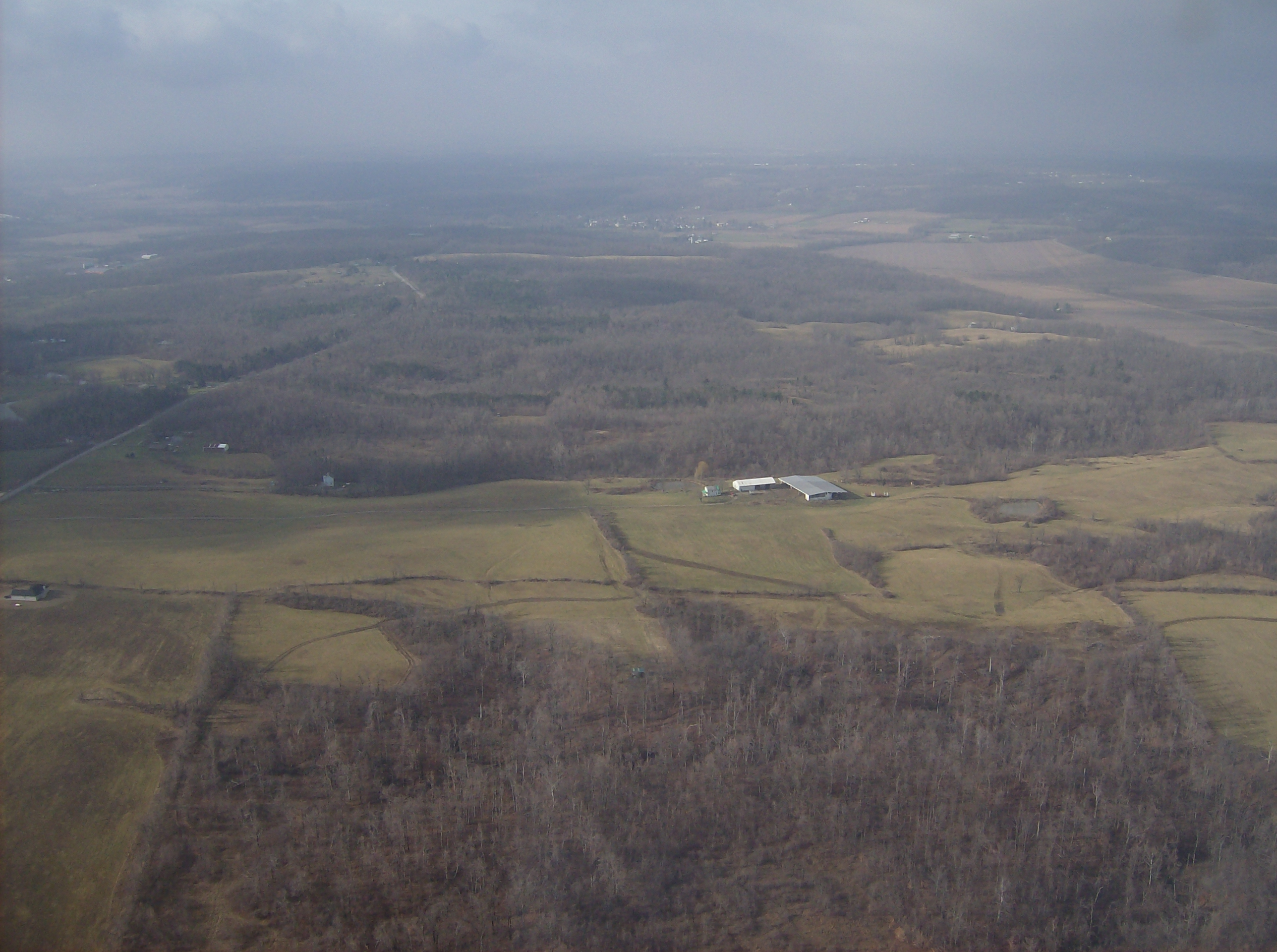
- Woods and hills northeast of Zanesfield

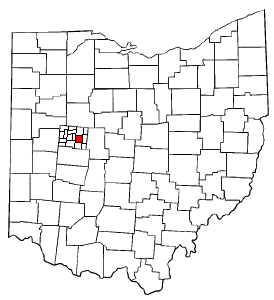
- Location of Jefferson Township in Ohio

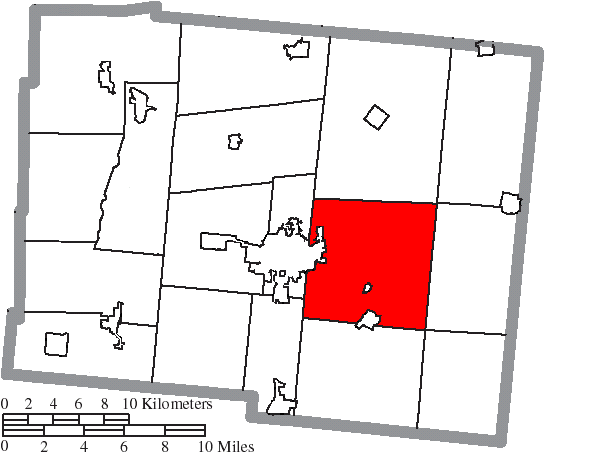
- Location of Jefferson Township in Logan County
- Coordinates: 40°21′13″N 83°41′28″W
- Country: United States
- State: Ohio
- County: Logan

Area
  - Total: 37.73 sq mi (97.72 km^{2})
  - Land: 37.63 sq mi (97.46 km^{2})
  - Water: 0.10 sq mi (0.26 km^{2})
- Elevation: 1,198 ft (365 m)

Population (2020)
  - Total: 3,028
  - Density: 80.47/sq mi (31.07/km^{2})
- Time zone: UTC-5 (Eastern (EST))
  - Summer (DST): UTC-4 (EDT)
- Area codes: 937, 326
- FIPS code: 39-38682
- GNIS feature ID: 1086484

Jefferson Township is one of the seventeen townships of Logan County, Ohio, United States. As of the 2020 census, the population was 3,028.

== Geography ==
Located in the eastern part of the county, it borders the following townships:

- Rushcreek Township - north
- Perry Township - east
- Zane Township - southeast corner
- Monroe Township - south
- Liberty Township - southwest
- Lake Township - west

Several municipalities are located in Jefferson Township:

- The village of Zanesfield, in the south center
- Part of the city of Bellefontaine, in the west
- Most of the village of Valley Hi, in the south

Compared with most of western Ohio, Jefferson Township is quite hilly. Campbell Hill, the highest point in Ohio, is located inside the Bellefontaine city limits in western Jefferson Township. On the other hand, the Marmon Valley, which extends through the southern part of the township, is a small pass through the Bellefontaine and Bristlecone Ridges. The same forces that shaped the township's terrain also created Zane Shawnee Caverns, a cave system in the northeastern part of the township.

Jefferson Township contains the source of the Mad River, and a ski resort — unusual for western Ohio — is located near Valley Hi in the southern part of the township.

== Name and history ==
It is one of 24 Jefferson Townships statewide.

Jefferson Township was formed in 1813 from Zane Township. It was one of the earliest parts of Logan County to be settled: its first settler was Isaac Zane, who arrived in 1800 and built the first house in what is now Zanesfield in 1811, and the Marmons who arrived in the township in 1805 were the first white families to live in the county. Because a significant percentage of the early settlers were Quakers, the township was once home to a large number of African Americans. Today, the township is the location of Goshen Friends Church, the oldest church in Logan County, and of the Martin Marmon House, one of the best examples of early nineteenth-century Quaker architecture in Ohio.

== Government ==
The township is governed by a three-member board of trustees, who are elected in November of odd-numbered years to a four-year term beginning on the following January 1. Two are elected in the year after the presidential election and one is elected in the year before it. There is also an elected township fiscal officer, who serves a four-year term beginning on April 1 of the year after the election, which is held in November of the year before the presidential election. Vacancies in the fiscal officership or on the board of trustees are filled by the remaining trustees.

== Transportation ==
U.S. Route 33 is the most important highway in Jefferson Township. Other significant highways include State Routes 47, 292, 533, and 540.
