= Kyle Ezell =

American academic and writer

Kyle Ezell (born Jonathan Kyle Ezell in Lawrenceburg, Tennessee) is an American urban planning practitioner, writer, and theorist. Ezell focuses on vibrant downtowns and expressing local culture in the built environment. He is currently a professor and head of the undergraduate planning program of the Knowlton School at Ohio State University.

Ezell received a Master of Science in geography from South Dakota State University in 1994. Prior to joining Ohio State University's Knowlton School, he practiced as an urban planner in Chattanooga, Tennessee, Dublin, Ohio, and Columbus, Ohio. Most notably he has published a number of urban focused books including: Get Urban!, and Retire Downtown.

== Partial bibliography ==
Ezell, Kyle, 2006. Retire Downtown: The Lifestyle Destination for Active Retirees and Empty Nesters. Andrews McMeel Publishing

Ezell, Kyle, 2004. Get Urban! The Complete Guide to City Living. Capital Books.
