= Merrill Elam =

American architect and educator

- Education: Georgia Institute of Technology; Georgia State University
- Occupation: Architect
- Practice: Mack Scogin Merrill Elam Architects
- Projects: Austin E. Knowlton School of Architecture

Merrill Elam is an American architect and educator based in Atlanta, Georgia. She is a principal with Mack Scogin in Mack Scogin Merrill Elam Architects where their work spans between buildings, interiors, planning, graphics and exhibition design, and research.

== Biography and education ==
She received a Bachelor of Architecture from the Georgia Institute of Technology in 1971 and a Master of Business Administration at the J. Mack Robinson College of Business Georgia State University in 1982.

== Career ==
She worked as an architect and senior associate at Heery & Heery Architects & Engineers for 12 years prior to establishing Scogin Elam and Bray Architects in 1984. In 2000, Mack Scogin and Merrill Elam Architects was established. She has been a licensed architect in 13 states, a member of the American Institute of Architects and is NCARB certified.

In addition to an active practice, she has been a visiting architecture professor in architecture programs across the country including Harvard University, Yale University, University of Toronto, University of Virginia, Ohio State University, Syracuse University, and University of Texas at Austin. She also formerly acted as president of the Georgia State Board of Architects. In addition she aided in founding the Architecture Society of Atlanta and is the former organization's former president.

== Selected projects ==
- The Round House, Connecticut, 2020
- One Midtown Plaza Lobby, Atlanta, Georgia, 2007
- Health Services Center, Yale University, New Haven, Connecticut, 2006
- Ernie Davis Hall, Syracuse University, Syracuse, New York, 2005
- Gates Center for Computer Science and Hillman Center for Future Generation Technologies, Carnegie Mellon University, Pittsburgh, Pennsylvania, 2005
- Zhongkai Sheshan Villas, Shanghai, China, 2004
- Carroll A. Campbell Jr. Graduate Engineering Center, Clemson University, Clemson, South Carolina, 2004
- U.S. Federal Courthouse, General Services Administration, Austin, Texas, 2003
- Lulu Chow Wang Campus Center and Davis Garage, Wellesley College, Wellesley, Massachusetts, 2001
- Carol Cobb Turner Branch Library, Marrow, Georgia, 1991
- John J. Ross - William C. Blakley Law Library, Arizona State University, Tempe, Arizona, 1993
- Austin E. Knowlton School of Architecture, Ohio State University, Columbus, Ohio, 1998
- Jean Gray Hargrove Music Library, University of California, Berkeley, Berkeley, California, 1998
- Mountain Tree House, Dillard, Georgia, 1998

== Honors and awards ==
- 2014 Design Leader award, Women in Architecture Awards, Architectural Record, 2014
- Shutze Medal, Georgia Institute of Technology with Mack Scogin, 2013
- Cooper-Hewitt National Design Award for Architecture with Mack Scogin, 2012
- Arnold W. Brunner Memorial Prize in Architecture, American Academy of Arts and Letters with Mack Scogin, 2011
- Royal Institute of British Architects, International Fellow, 2008
- Chrysler Award for Innovation in Design with Mack Scogin, 1996
- Arts and Letters Award in Architecture, American Academy of Arts and Letters with Mack Scogin, 1995
