= Ridgemont High School =

Ridgemont High School may refer to:

- Ridgemont High School (Ohio), in Ridgeway, Ohio, United States
- Ridgemont High School (Ottawa), in Ottawa, Ontario, Canada
