= Northwood, Logan County, Ohio =

Northwood, Ohio
- Unincorporated community
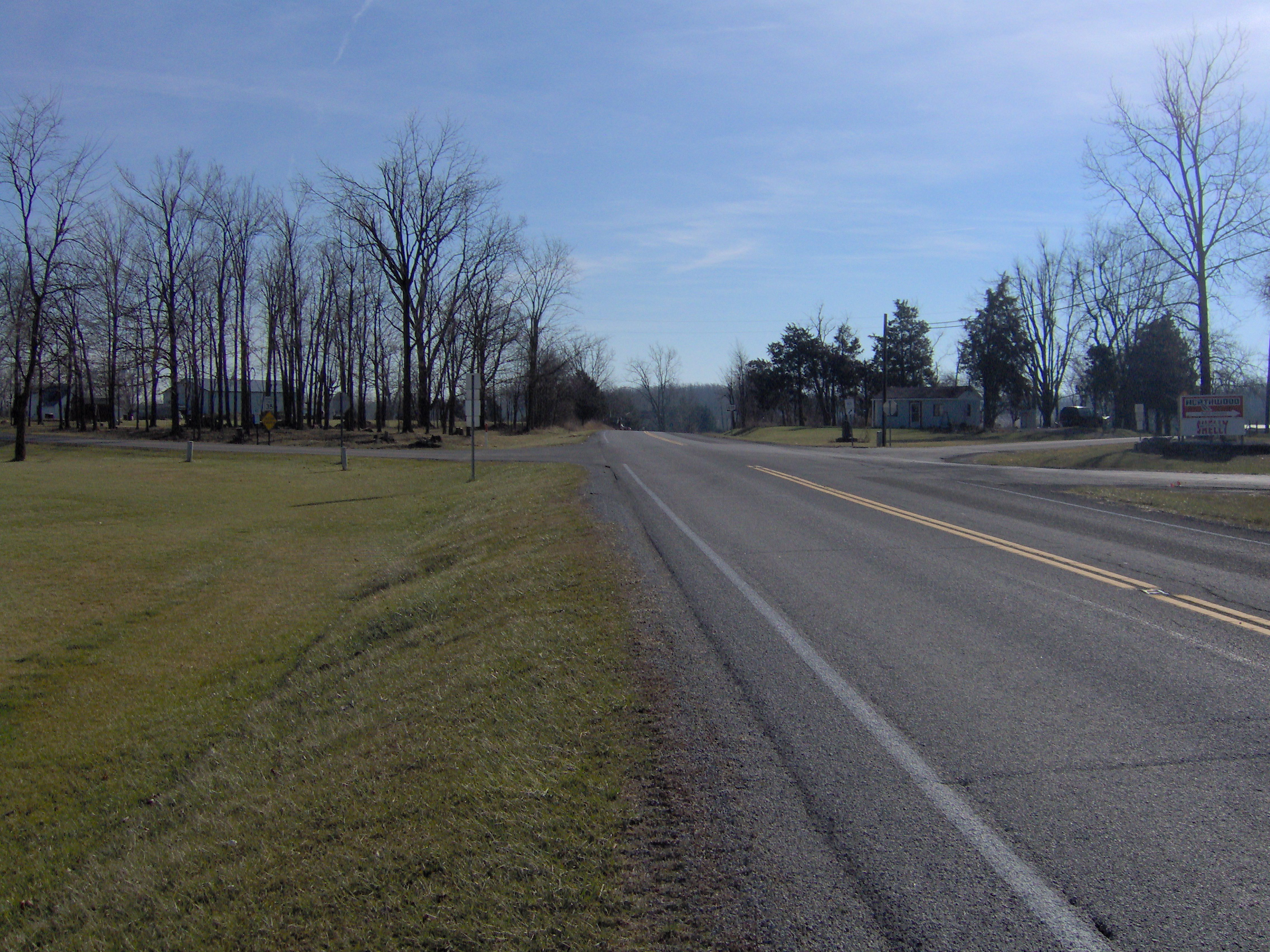
- Northwood today

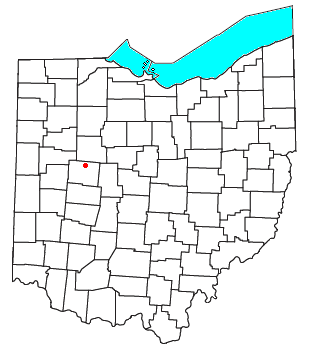
- Location of Northwood, Ohio
- Coordinates: 40°28′22″N 83°43′57″W
- Country: United States
- State: Ohio
- County: Logan
- Townships: Richland, McArthur
- Elevation: 1,148 ft (350 m)
- Time zone: UTC-5 (Eastern (EST))
  - Summer (DST): UTC-4 (EDT)
- GNIS feature ID: 1049026

Northwood is a small, unincorporated community crossroads village in northern Logan County, Ohio, United States. It lies along the line between Richland Township and McArthur Township, approximately two miles south of the village of Belle Center and near the South Fork of the Great Miami River. Northwood was founded in the early 19th century, during the early years of settlement in Logan County. Its primary significance lies in its being the original site of Geneva College.

== Geneva College ==
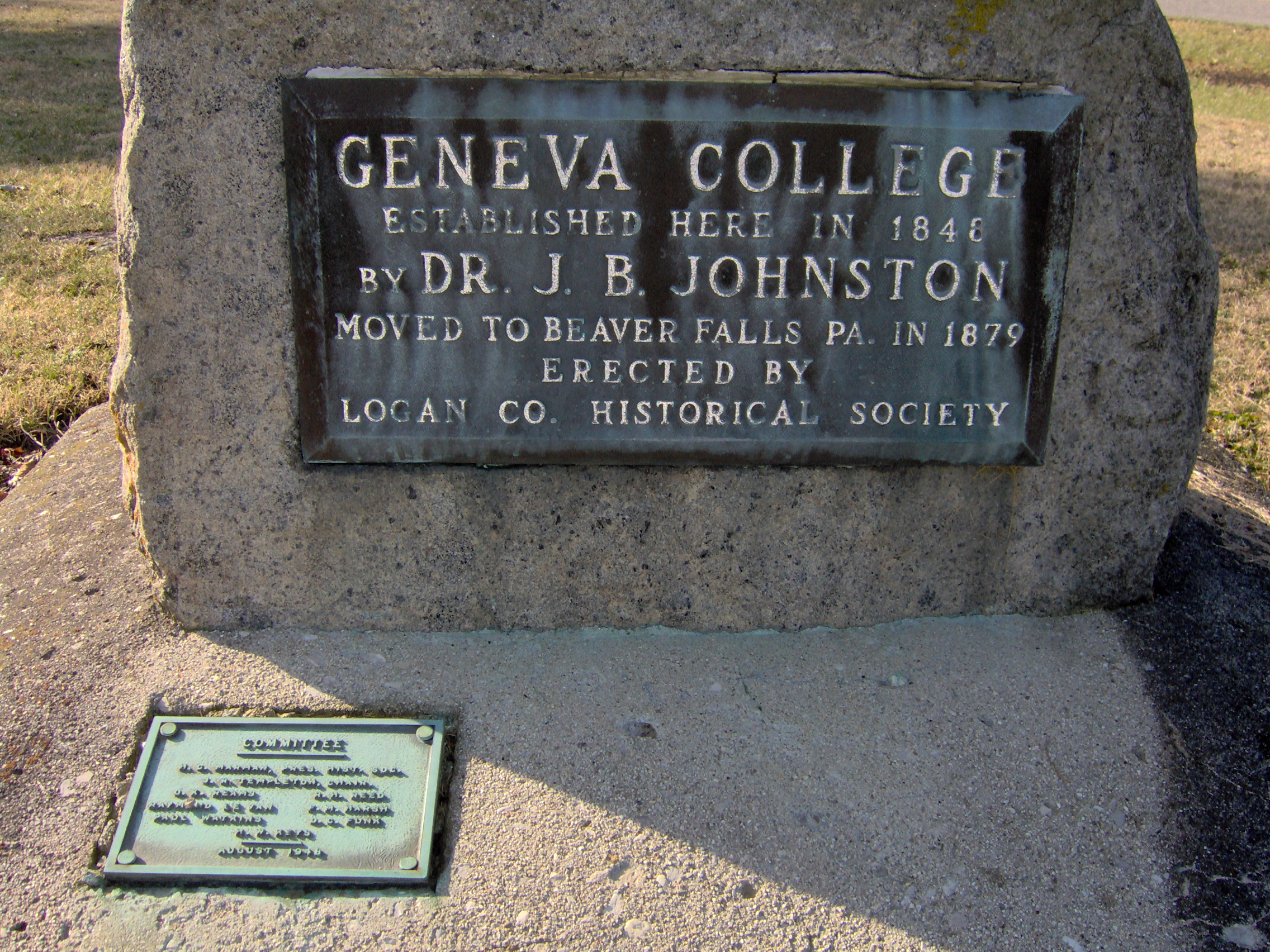
Marker for the original site of Geneva College

During the 1830s, the Rev. J. B. Johnston, pastor of the Miami Reformed Presbyterian Church in Northwood, began teaching a small classical school in his study. Friends and relatives, noticing the popularity of his classes, began to suggest the opening of a small college in the area. Eventually, Geneva Hall was opened in the spring of 1848, partially under the oversight of the Lakes Presbytery of the Reformed Presbyterian Church. Despite its initial popularity, the school soon failed for lack of money and support. At the end of the Civil War, Geneva was reopened as a school for freedmen and soon began to educate whites as well. The community received a post office on November 24, 1868. During the 1870s, its name was changed from Geneva Hall to Geneva College, and the college became significant enough that the town's name was changed to "West Geneva". Although the college flourished, it moved to Beaver Falls, Pennsylvania in 1880, largely because of Northwood's lack of a railroad and because of greater financial possibilities there.

=== Other schools ===
During the Geneva years, Northwood also hosted two other educational institutions. As Geneva was founded as a men's school, Rev. Johnston founded a similar Female Seminary in 1851. Furthermore, the Reformed Presbyterian Theological Seminary operated in Northwood for a short time.

== Other history ==
Because of the strongly abolitionist beliefs of the Reformed Presbyterian Church, and because of small caves in the woods and fields nearby, Northwood was a center for the Underground Railroad.

After 1880, Northwood declined. While Northwood was never a large town, the departure of the College removed the village's significance, and "West Geneva" reverted to the old name of Northwood. Its post office closed on June 6, 1901, and local residents received Belle Center addresses. During the 1940s, State Route 638 was constructed through the village, curving over the old college property. Today, Northwood is composed of fewer than twenty homes, and only a stone marker remains to mark the College. Its primary significance today is a quarry and asphalt plant.

== Notable natives ==
- Clarence E. Macartney, prominent Presbyterian preacher and author
