= Logan County District Library =

Coordinates: 40°21′49″N 83°45′32″W

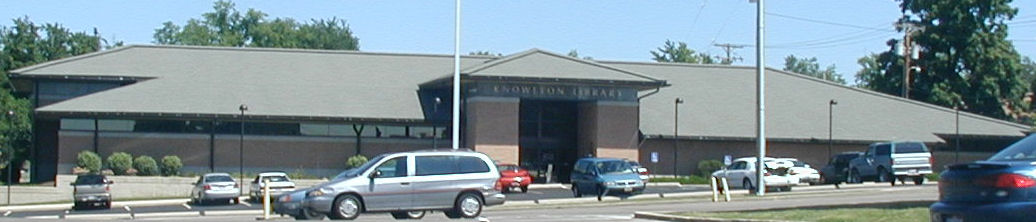
The Knowlton Library in Bellefontaine

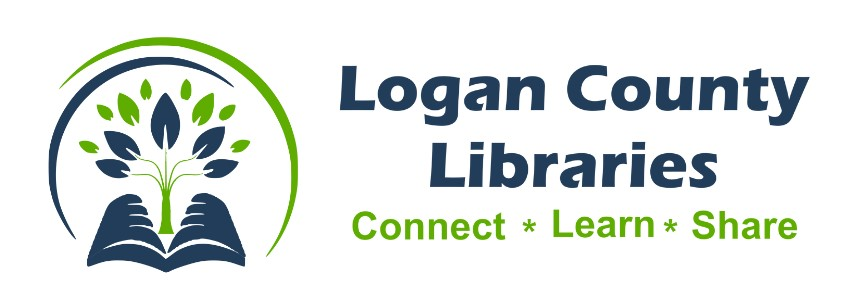
logo

The Logan County District Library is a public library system that serves communities throughout Logan County, Ohio, United States.

The system's central library, which is also its oldest and largest branch, is the Knowlton Library, located along Main Street (U.S. Route 68) in downtown Bellefontaine. The Knowlton Library was named for Austin Eldon Knowlton, for whom the school of architecture at Ohio State University is also named.

Although the current structure was only completed in 1994, the library has occupied a location in downtown Bellefontaine since its founding in 1901. From 1905 until 1994, the library was housed in a Carnegie library building, funded by Andrew Carnegie. The Carnegie building was bought by Richwood Bank in 2020.

== Other libraries ==
Branch libraries are also maintained in six villages throughout the county: De Graff, Lakeview, Rushsylvania, West Liberty, and West Mansfield. Because of their smaller size, these branches offer fewer services and a smaller selection of books and media.

An East Liberty branch was closed in 2012 due to decreased funding, with services being merged into the West Mansfield library.

Two other public libraries exist in Logan County: the Sloan Library in Zanesfield and the Belle Center Public Library. These two libraries are not part of the Logan County District Library system.
