= Ohio State Route 117 =

State highway in western Ohio, US

State Route 117

Route information
- Maintained by ODOT
- Length: 59.57 mi (95.87 km)
- Existed: 1924–present

Major junctions
- West end: SR 118 near Rockford
- US 127 near Rockford; I-75 in Lima
- East end: US 33 / CR 130 near Huntsville

Location
- Country: United States
- State: Ohio
- Counties: Mercer, Van Wert, Allen, Auglaize, Hardin, Logan

Highway system
- Ohio State Highway System; Interstate; US; State; Scenic
| ← SR 116 | → SR 118 |

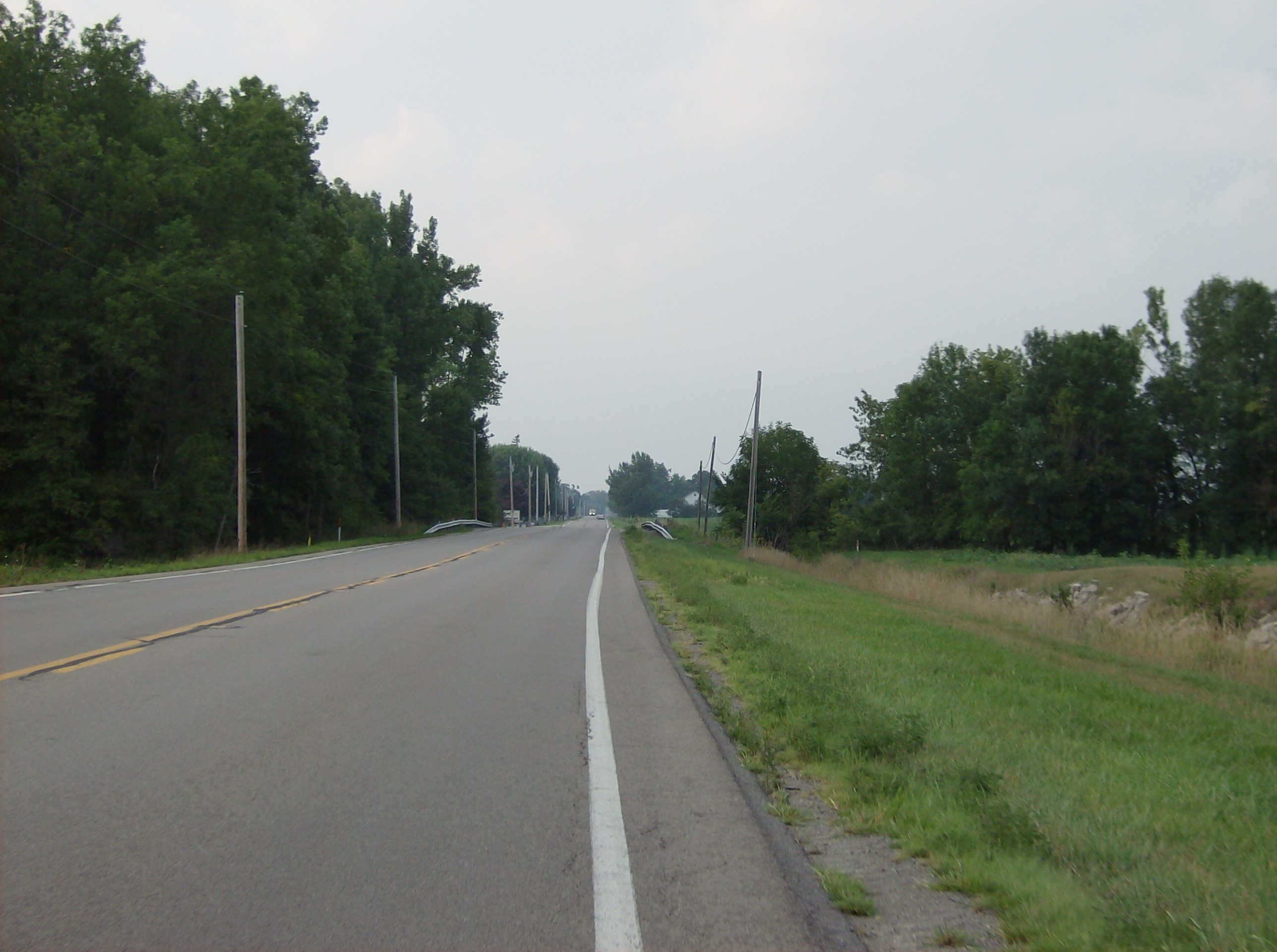
Along State Route 117 in northwestern Logan County.

State Route 117 (SR 117) is an east–west highway in the western part of the U.S. state of Ohio. Its western terminus is at State Route 118 near Rockford, and its eastern terminus is at U.S. Route 33 near Huntsville. It goes through the towns of Spencerville and Lima, and comes close to Indian Lake. East of Lima, the route takes a southeast to south-southeast heading to its eastern terminus.

== History ==
State Route 117 was an original state highway that went from State Route 116 a few miles east of Spencerville to Bellefontaine, with the portion from Huntsville to Bellefontaine a concurrency with then State Route 32.

In 1926, rerouting switched State Route 116 and State Route 198 so that the former would have a straighter heading. State Route 198 was given State Route 116's former heading into Wapakoneta and was truncated at route State Route 117's then-western terminus, and State Route 117 was extended on State Route 116's former eastern heading through Spencerville and all the way to then-State Route 9 (now U.S. Route 127) through Mendon. In the same year, its concurrency with State Route 32 was ended, and its eastern terminus was moved to Huntsville.

In 1938, another rerouting moved State Route 117's western terminus to its current terminus. Its route through Mendon was recertified as State Route 707.

In 1950, State Route 117 was once again routed in a concurrency to Bellefontaine, this time with U.S. Route 33 (which had replaced State Route 32 in 1938). This concurrency was ended in 1968, and State Route 117 was truncated at its current eastern terminus.

== Major intersections ==
| County | Location | mi | km | Destinations | Notes |
|---|---|---|---|---|---|
| Mercer | Dublin Township | 0.00 | 0.00 | SR 118 | |
| Mercer | Dublin Township | 4.11 | 6.61 | US 127 – Van Wert, Celina | |
| Mercer | Union Township | 7.64 | 12.30 | SR 707 west / CR 151C (Hickernell Road) – Mendon | Eastern terminus of SR 707 |
| Van Wert | Jennings Township | 12.56 | 20.21 | SR 116 south / Louth Road – St. Marys | Western end of SR 116 concurrency |
| Van Wert | Jennings Township | 12.76 | 20.54 | SR 116 north / Biner Road – Van Wert | Eastern end of SR 116 concurrency |
| Allen | Spencerville | 16.54 | 26.62 | SR 66 (North Broadway Street) | |
| Allen | Amanda Township | 20.40 | 32.83 | SR 198 south / CR 71 (South Conant Road) – Wapakoneta | Northern terminus of SR 198 |
| Allen | Shawnee Township | 24.54 | 39.49 | SR 501 south / Wapak Road | Northern terminus of SR 501 |
| Allen | Lima | 30.64 | 49.31 | SR 65 north / SR 309 west (South Union Street) | Western end of SR 65 / SR 309 concurrencies |
| Allen | Lima | 30.85 | 49.65 | SR 65 south (South Pine Street) | Eastern end of SR 65 concurrency |
| Allen | Lima | 32.19– 32.38 | 51.80– 52.11 | I-75 – Dayton, Findlay, Toledo | Exit 125 (I-75) |
| Allen | Bath–Perry township line | 32.51 | 52.32 | SR 309 east / Willard Avenue – Kenton | Eastern end of SR 309 concurrency |
| Allen | Auglaize Township | 38.47 | 61.91 | SR 196 south – Waynesfield | Northern terminus of SR 196 |
| Auglaize–Hardin county line | Wayne–Roundhead township line | 46.28 | 74.48 | SR 67 west – Wapakoneta | Western end of SR 67 concurrency |
| Hardin | Roundhead Township | 47.86 | 77.02 | SR 67 east / TR 170 – Kenton | Eastern end of SR 67 concurrency |
| Hardin | Roundhead Township | 50.09 | 80.61 | SR 385 west / East Mill Street | Eastern terminus of SR 385 |
| Hardin | Roundhead Township | 50.22 | 80.82 | SR 235 north – Ada | Western end of SR 235 concurrency |
| Hardin | Roundhead Township | 52.17 | 83.96 | SR 235 south | Eastern end of SR 235 concurrency |
| Logan | Richland Township | 53.13 | 85.50 | SR 273 west – Long Island | Western end of SR 273 concurrency |
| Logan | Richland Township | 53.96 | 86.84 | SR 273 east – Mount Victory | Eastern end of SR 273 concurrency |
| Logan | Richland–McArthur township line | 56.98– 57.23 | 91.70– 92.10 | SR 366 north – Russells Point, Lakeview | Southern terminus of SR 366 |
| Logan | McArthur Township–Huntsville municipal line | 58.25 | 93.74 | SR 274 west | Western end of SR 274 concurrency |
| Logan | McArthur Township | 58.95 | 94.87 | SR 274 east / Sharon Street | Eastern end of SR 274 concurrency |
| Logan | McArthur Township | 59.06– 59.57 | 95.05– 95.87 | US 33 / CR 130 – Russells Point, Bellefontaine, Marysville | Interchange |
1.000 mi = 1.609 km; 1.000 km = 0.621 mi: Concurrency terminus
