= Ohio State Route 273 =

East-west state highway in Ohio, US

State Route 273

Route information
- Maintained by ODOT
- Length: 19.78 mi (31.83 km)
- Existed: 1930–present

Major junctions
- West end: Maple Lane near Belle Center
- US 68 near Belle Center
- East end: SR 31 in Mt. Victory

Location
- Country: United States
- State: Ohio
- Counties: Logan, Hardin

Highway system
- Ohio State Highway System; Interstate; US; State; Scenic
← SR 272	→ SR 274

State Route 273 (SR 273) is a two-lane east–west state highway in Logan and Hardin counties in the U.S. state of Ohio. It begins at an intersection with State Route 31 in Mt. Victory, passes through Belle Center, and ends in a dead end on Long Island at Indian Lake. Along the way, it intersects State Route 292 (north of Ridgeway), State Route 274 (north of the crossroads of Big Springs), US 68 (at the former location of Whitestown, today occupied only by a butcher's shop), and State Route 638 (in Belle Center). It overlaps State Route 117 for a short distance near Indian Lake.

West of State Route 117, State Route 273 continues for two miles (3 km), to the Indian Lake community of Long Island. This is an unincorporated area with approximately 200 permanent and 1,000 seasonal residents. The state highway ends at the bridge to Long Island.

== History ==
SR 273 was commissioned in 1930 between SR 117 and SR 53, later became US 68. In 1937, the highway was extended west to its current western terminus on Long Island. In the same year the route was extended east to its current eastern terminus in Mt. Victory.

== Major intersections ==
County	Location	mi	km	Destinations	Notes
Logan	Richland Township	0.00	0.00	Maple Lane	
Logan	Richland Township	2.02	3.25	SR 117 west	Northern end of SR 117 concurrency
Logan	Richland Township	2.85	4.59	SR 117 east	southern end of SR 117 concurrency
Logan	Belle Center	7.38	11.88	SR 638 south	Northern terminus of SR 638
Logan	Rushcreek Township	9.91	15.95	US 68	
Logan	Rushcreek Township	12.89	20.74	SR 274 west	Eastern terminus of SR 274
Hardin	Hale Township	16.88	27.17	SR 292	
Hardin	Mount Victory	19.78	31.83	SR 31	
1.000 mi = 1.609 km; 1.000 km = 0.621 mi: Concurrency terminus
