= Ohio State Route 638 =

State highway in Logan County, Ohio, US

State Route 638

Route information
- Maintained by ODOT
- Length: 3.99 mi (6.42 km)
- Existed: 1937–present

Major junctions
- South end: US 68 near Bellefontaine
- North end: SR 273 in Belle Center

Location
- Country: United States
- State: Ohio
- Counties: Logan

Highway system
- Ohio State Highway System; Interstate; US; State; Scenic
← SR 637	→ SR 640

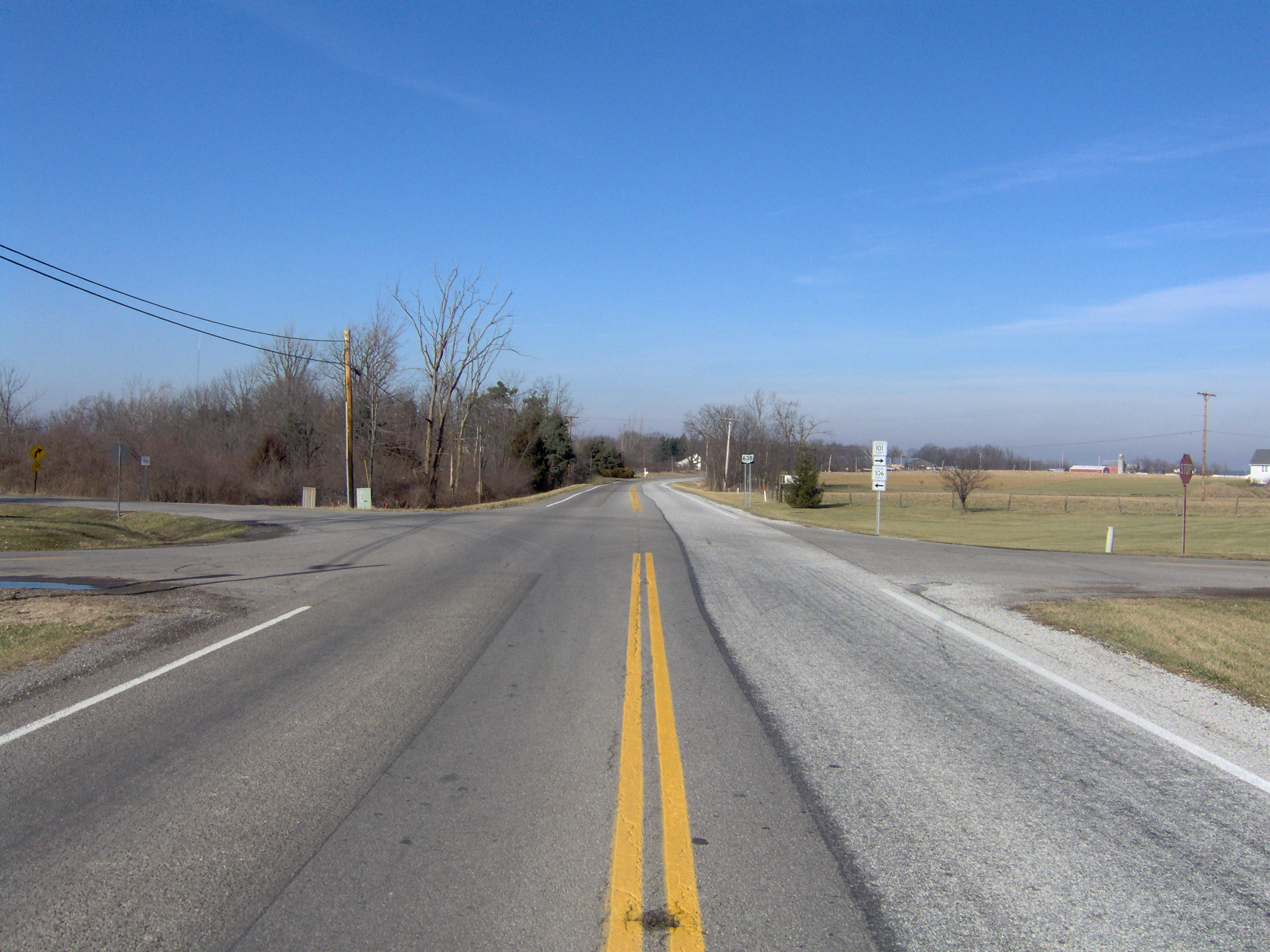
View northward at Northwood

State Route 638 (SR 638) is a two-lane north–south state highway in the west central portion of Ohio, a U.S. state. SR 638 has its southern terminus at an intersection with U.S. Route 68 (US 68) just over six miles (9.7 km) north of the city of Bellefontaine. The northern terminus of the route is at SR 273 at the extreme southeastern corner of the village of Belle Center.

Created in the late 1930s, SR 638 runs exclusively within Logan County. Serving as a cutoff route between US 68 and SR 273, the highway passes amid a topography that consists mostly of farm fields, although it also passes several small wooded areas.

== Route description ==
The entirety of SR 638 is situated in northern portions of Logan County. SR 638 is not included as a part of the National Highway System.

The highway begins at a sharp T-intersection with US 68 in northeastern McArthur Township under 765,000-volt power lines. Starting out traveling in a north-northeasterly direction, SR 638 passes through a backdrop of farmland for its entire duration, with the occasional patch of trees and the occasional home appearing alongside the roadway. The route meets SR 274, passes by Fulton Cemetery, then bends to the north-northwest. SR 638 meets County Road 113 (CR 113), turns to the north and passes Township Road 109. The highway intersects CR 103 as it curves to the northwest, then comes upon a five-approach intersection at Northwood, where it crosses southeast-to-northwest, and meets CR 106 (west approach) and CR 101 (south and east approaches). At this location, SR 638 crosses into Richland Township. The highway goes on to meet CR 106 again, at which point it turns to the north. SR 638 then meets Township Roads 51 and 242 successively prior to entering the extreme southeastern corner of the village of Belle Center, at which point this route comes to an end at its junction with SR 273.

== History ==
SR 638 was created in 1937 along the path that it maintains to this day between US 68 and SR 273 in northern Logan County. The highway has not experienced any major changes since its designation.

== Major intersections ==
The entire route is in Logan County.

Location	mi	km	Destinations	Notes
McArthur Township	0.00	0.00	US 68	
McArthur Township	0.41	0.66	SR 274	
Belle Center	3.99	6.42	SR 273 / Charles Street	
1.000 mi = 1.609 km; 1.000 km = 0.621 mi
