= Austin Eldon Knowlton =

American architect (1909–2003)

Austin Eldon "Dutch" Knowlton (July 23, 1909 – June 25, 2003) was a trained architect who spent most of his career in the construction industry. His company designed, financed, and built more than 160 college and university buildings on college campuses in Ohio and more than 200 elementary and secondary school buildings. His companies have also constructed more than 35 major hospitals and 43 United States Post Offices throughout the country. In his lifetime, he designed more than 600 buildings.

== Early life and education ==
A. E. Knowlton was born in Athens, Ohio in 1909, the second child of Clarence Luster Knowlton ("CL") and Vertura Mae Cundiff. His father had founded Knowlton Brothers Construction in 1906 with his brother Everett and had been in the construction business in Athens, Ohio. About 1917, they were awarded the contract to build the Mary Rutan Hospital in Bellefontaine, Ohio and both brothers relocated to Bellefontaine and made it their home. The brothers separated their business about 1923, at which time "CL" formed his new company, C. L. Knowlton and Sons, Contractors, with sons Clarence Ernest ("CE") and Austin Eldon ("AE").

Eldon Knowlton grew up in Bellefontine, played football in high school and gained the nickname "Dutch" and graduated from Bellefontaine High School in 1927. He attended Ohio State University and was a member of Alpha Rho Chi fraternity. He graduated with a Bachelor of Science in architecture in 1931.

== Career ==
He rejoined his father's firm after graduation. After his father's retirement from the business, "AE" and "CE" founded the Knowlton Construction Company in 1937. Although Dutch suffered from dyslexia, he could add long columns of numbers in his head, and used a slide rule to calculate construction bids.

A. E. "Dutch" Knowlton's company specialized in educational, health care and commercial buildings. At his alma mater alone, he designed the Fawcett Center, Hitchcock Hall, Houck House, Jones Graduate Tower, the School of Allied Medical Professions, Wilce Health Center, Drake Union and Larkins Hall addition (the latter demolished 2005 to make way for a new Recreation and Physical Activities Center).

In 1967, Knowlton was the majority shareholder with 30% of the Cincinnati Bengals along with Paul Brown and others and later served as chairman. That same year, Knowlton gained a majority interest in the Cincinnati Reds, purchasing 15% from William O. DeWitt Jr. to total 29%. He was also a trustee of the Little Brown Jug Society for harness racing in Delaware, Ohio. He raised championship American Saddlebred horses at Emerald Farms, and was a Trustee of the Little Brown Jug Society which runs the Triple Crown of Harness Racing for Pacers in Delaware, Ohio.

In 1981, Knowlton established The Austin E. Knowlton Foundation to promote and advance higher education. The Foundation has made many charitable gifts including funding the Knowlton Library of the Logan County District Library in memory of his parents and to The Ohio State University.

In 1994 The Ohio State University renamed its School of Architecture the "Austin E. Knowlton School of Architecture". University President E. Gordon Gee praised the gift from Knowlton that made it possible for OSU to provide the finest architectural education possible. A new building designed by the firm of Mack Scogin Merrill Elam Architects of Atlanta, Georgia, Knowlton Hall, opened for the School of Architecture in the fall of 2004. As part of the donation agreement, the building was designed with marble cladding. In 1995, Ohio State presented an Honorary Doctorate of Architecture to A. E. Knowlton.

== Personal life ==
Austin Eldon Knowlton married Phyllis Yvonne Coulon of Bowling Green, Ohio, in August 1933 in Wilmette, Illinois. They had three children. He was divorced from Phyllis in 1974, becoming estranged from his children and later married and divorced Susan J. Dlott. He resided in Bowling Green and Hamilton, Ohio before building a home on his Emerald Farms in Delaware County, Ohio in 1947. In later life he spent winters in Fort Lauderdale, Florida until he donated his Delaware estate in 2001 to Augustana College and took up Florida residence full-time.

== Death and legacy ==
Austin Knowlton died on June 25, 2003.

After Knowlton's death, two of his three children from his first marriage claimed the will was a forgery after being left out of the will. It was believed to be the largest probate case ever with an estimated net of between $42 and $300 million. In 2007, the will was ruled legitimate and a large portion of the money went to his foundation, including his 30% share of the Bengals.

Augustana College's honors program is named after Austin.
