= Ohio State Route 274 =

State highway in western Ohio, US

State Route 274

Route information
- Maintained by ODOT
- Length: 52.73 mi (84.86 km)
- Existed: 1930–present

Major junctions
- West end: US 127 near Chickasaw
- I-75 near Botkins; US 33 near Huntsville; US 68 near Rushsylvania
- East end: SR 273 near Rushsylvania

Location
- Country: United States
- State: Ohio
- Counties: Mercer, Auglaize, Shelby, Logan

Highway system
- Ohio State Highway System; Interstate; US; State; Scenic
← SR 273	→ I-275

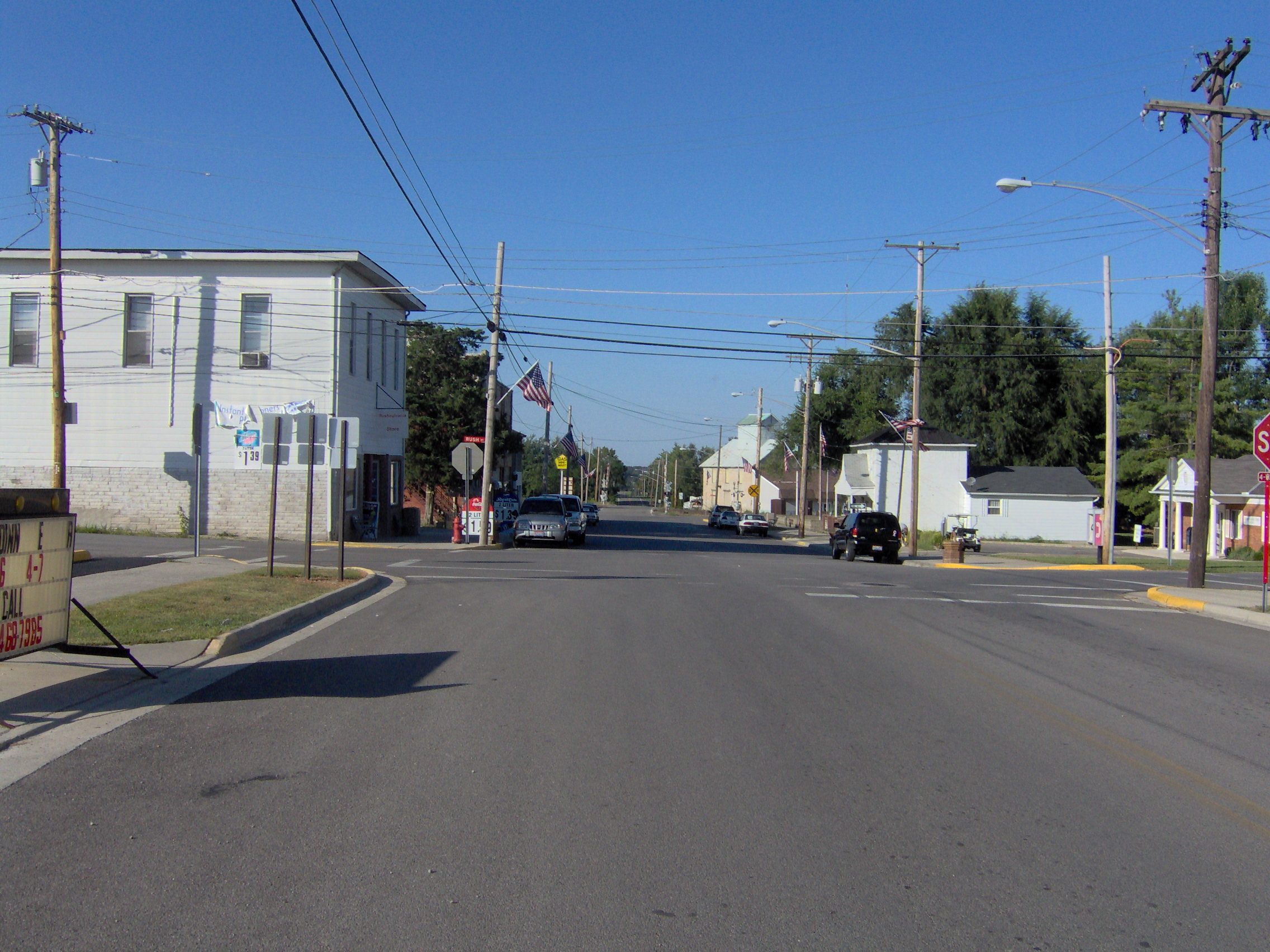
View along State Route 274 in Rushsylvania.

State Route 274 (SR 274) is a two-lane east–west state highway located in the western portion of the U.S. state of Ohio. The western terminus of State Route 274 is at a T-intersection with U.S. Route 127 approximately 4 miles (6.4 km) west of Chickasaw. Its eastern terminus is at another T-intersection, this time with State Route 273 about 3.5 miles (5.6 km) northeast of Rushsylvania. State Route 274 is about 52.7 miles long (84.9km). Just after New Bremen, the route crosses over St. Marys River, on the way to Jackson Center.

== Route description ==
State Route 274 traverses portions of Auglaize, Mercer, Shelby and Logan Counties. No portion of State Route 274 is included within the National Highway System, a system of highways determined to be most important for the economy, mobility and defense of the nation.

== History ==
State Route 274 was designated in 1930. It was originally routed between State Route 66 in New Bremen and what was originally designated State Route 69 (now State Route 235) near Russells Point. In 1937, the highway was extended on both ends, on the west to its current western terminus at U.S. Route 127 west of Chickasaw, and on the east to its current eastern endpoint at State Route 273 northeast of Rushsylvania.

== Major intersections ==
County	Location	mi	km	Destinations	Notes
Mercer	Marion Township	0.00	0.00	US 127	
Mercer	Chickasaw	4.12	6.63	SR 716 south	Northern terminus of SR 716
Auglaize	German Township	7.29	11.73	SR 364	
Auglaize	New Bremen	10.09	16.24	SR 66	
Shelby	Van Buren Township	13.46	21.66	SR 29 west	Western end of SR 29 concurrency
Shelby	Van Buren Township	14.30	23.01	SR 29 east	Eastern end of SR 29 concurrency
Shelby	Dinsmore Township	21.24	34.18	I-75	Exit 102 (I-75)
Shelby	Jackson Center	28.08	45.19	SR 65	
Logan	Washington Township	35.12	56.52	SR 235	
Logan	McArthur Township	39.67	63.84	US 33	
Logan	Huntsville	40.39	65.00	SR 117 west	Western end of SR 117 concurrency
Logan	Huntsville	41.09	66.13	SR 117 east	Eastern end of SR 117 concurrency
Logan	McArthur Township	45.68	73.51	SR 638	
Logan	McArthur Township	45.87	73.82	US 68	
Logan	Rushcreek Township	52.73	84.86	SR 273	
1.000 mi = 1.609 km; 1.000 km = 0.621 mi: Concurrency terminus
