= Clarence E. Macartney =

American pastor and writer (1879–1957)

The Reverend Clarence Edward Noble Macartney
- Born: September 18, 1879; Northwood, Ohio
- Died: February 19, 1957 (aged 77); Geneva College; Beaver Falls, Pennsylvania
- Education: University of Wisconsin–Madison
- Occupation: Presbyterian pastor
- Employer: Geneva College
- Known for: Fundamentalist–Modernist Controversy
- Parent(s): John L. McCartney; Catherine Robertson

Clarence Edward Noble McCartney (September 18, 1879 – February 19, 1957) was a prominent conservative Presbyterian pastor and author. With J. Gresham Machen, he was one of the main leaders of the conservatives during the Fundamentalist–Modernist Controversy in the Presbyterian Church in the United States of America.

== Early life, 1879-1905 ==
Macartney was born in Northwood, Ohio, on September 18, 1879. His father, John L. McCartney was the pastor of the Reformed Presbyterian Church of North America in Northwood and professor of Natural Science at Geneva College. His mother, born Catherine Robertson, was the daughter of a wealthy Scottish mill owner. The two met during a period when John McCartney was preaching on the Isle of Bute – Robertson's father was opposed to the marriage.

Geneva College (and the Macartneys with it) moved to Beaver Falls, Pennsylvania, in 1880. In 1894, in response to John's respiratory problems, the family moved to Redlands, California, and then to Claremont in 1895 when John took up a post at Pomona College. In 1896, the family moved again, to Denver, but Clarence stayed behind to finish high school in Claremont before enrolling in the University of Denver in 1897. At this point, two of Clarence's older brothers, who were pastors in Wisconsin, convinced the family to move to Madison, so Clarence transferred to the University of Wisconsin–Madison. He majored in English literature and graduated in 1901. In 1901, he moved to Cambridge, Massachusetts, to pursue graduate work at Harvard, but grew frustrated and spent a year travelling in England, Scotland, and France. Upon his return he briefly returned to Beaver Falls to visit another brother and worked as a reporter with the Beaver Times. In 1902, he enrolled in Yale Divinity School, though, still restless, he departed after one class, and transferred to Princeton Theological Seminary, where another brother was enrolled. It was about this time that Macartney's religious and vocational drift ended; he rejected the liberal values of Wisconsin–Madison and Yale; and threw himself behind the doctrines of Old School Presbyterianism taught at Princeton. His professors included B. B. Warfield, Francis Patton, Robert Dick Wilson, and, his personal favorite, church historian Frederick Loetscher.

== Minister in Paterson, New Jersey, 1905–1914 ==
Upon his graduation in 1905, he opted to seek ordination not in the Reformed Presbyterian Church in which he had been raised, but rather in the larger Presbyterian Church in the United States of America. In October, the Presbytery of Jersey City ordained Macartney to the pastorate of the First Presbyterian Church of Paterson, New Jersey, a struggling downtown congregation, into which Macartney's energy breathed new life. During this period, Macartney became an outspoken advocate of prohibition.

== Minister in Philadelphia, 1914–1927 ==
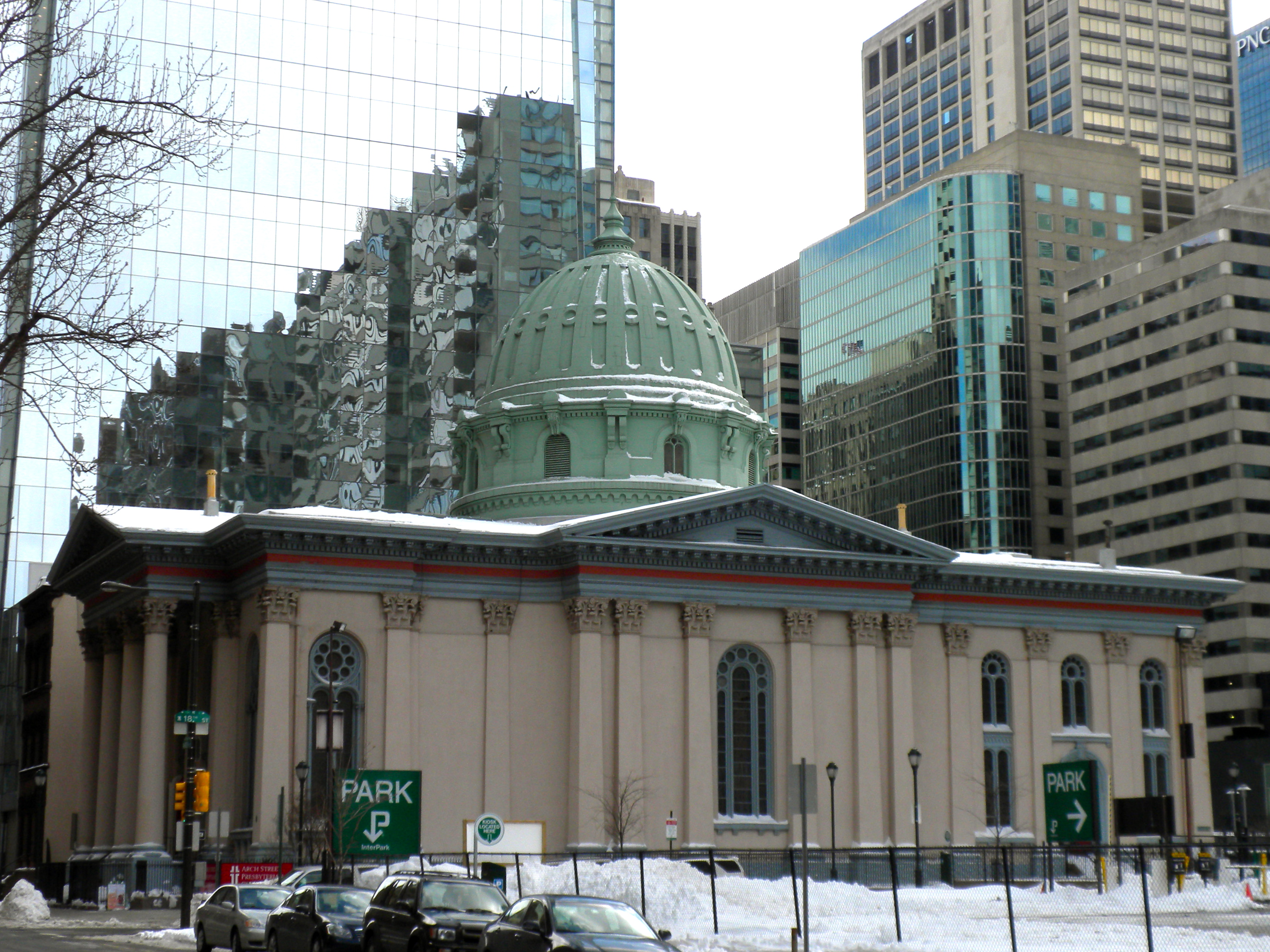
Arch Street Presbyterian Church

In 1914, he accepted a call from Arch Street Presbyterian Church in Philadelphia, a second congregation located in a deteriorating neighborhood. In time, he began broadcasting his sermons on the radio and eventually gained the reputation as Philadelphia's foremost preacher. Later, he began delivering a weekly lecture on homiletics at Princeton Theological Seminary.

In 1919, Macartney engaged in his first printed exchange with Harry Emerson Fosdick. In a piece entitled "The Trenches and the Church at Home", Fosdick argued that soldiers returning home from World War I would not be able to accept the traditional doctrines and mores and that the church needed to adjust its doctrines to the spirit of the age. In a response in The Presbyterian, Macartney argued that Christian truth was unchanging and could meet any crisis without needing to be changed.

This exchange, however, was merely a preface to their famous exchange in 1922, when Fosdick preached and distributed his famous sermon "Shall the Fundamentalists Win?" and Macartney responded with "Shall Unbelief Win?", thus setting off the Fundamentalist–Modernist Controversy in the PCUSA. Alarmed by Fosdick's apparent rejection of Christian orthodoxy, Macartney convinced the Presbytery of Philadelphia to ask the General Assembly of the Presbyterian Church in the USA to take action to silence Fosdick. At the General Assembly of 1923, Macartney found an ally in William Jennings Bryan, whose arguments on the floor of the Assembly were crucial to securing a vote to affirm the denomination's commitment to the so-called "Five Fundamentals" and ordering New York Presbytery to deal with Fosdick. In the 1924 General Assembly, where the Fosdick case was again raised, Bryan's support was again crucial to Macartney being elected as Moderator. Macartney's role at this Assembly was crucial in having Fosdick resign his position. In 1925, Bryan asked Macartney to attend the Scopes Trial with him, but Macartney refused. In 1926, when the Special Commission appointed to deal with New York Presbytery's ordination of two men who denied the virgin birth recommended a tolerance in the spirit of the Auburn Affirmation, Macartney was the leading voice calling for stricter adherence to the Five Fundamentals. Macartney's older, more liberal brother Albert spoke against him during this debate.

== Minister in Pittsburgh, 1927–1953 ==
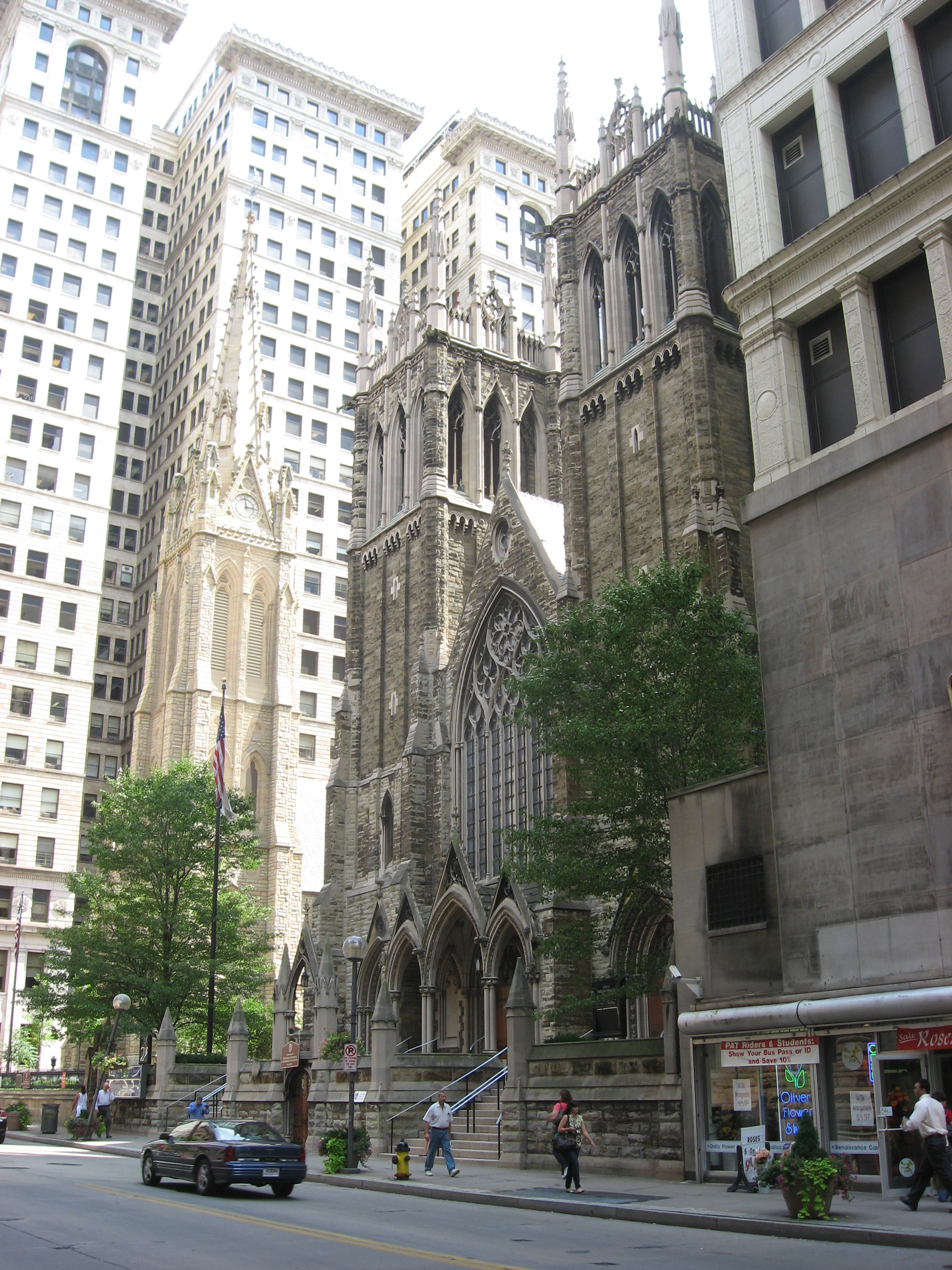
First Presbyterian Church

In 1927, Macartney took up a new pastorate, at the First Presbyterian Church of Pittsburgh. This would be his largest congregation, regularly drawing 1200–1600 worshippers on Sunday mornings and about 900 at the Sunday evening service. He also held a Wednesday evening service, the sermons from which formed the basis of two books he later published: Things Most Surely Believed (1930) and What Jesus Really Taught (1958). In 1930, he founded the Tuesday Noon Club for Businessmen, an interdenominational group of Pittsburgh businessmen who met Tuesdays at noon for lunch, singing, and a brief inspirational message - eventually, the group had over 2000 members, with a regular attendance of over 800.

In the denominational politics of the following decade, Macartney often advocated a more moderate approach than that favored by J. Gresham Machen. Although he initially opposed founding Westminster Theological Seminary in 1929 when Princeton Theological Seminary was re-organized by the denomination along semi-modernist lines, he agreed to serve on Westminster's board. He opposed Machen's creation of an independent missions board, and, after Machen was censured for setting up this board, Macartney also opposed Machen's Presbyterian Constitutional Covenant Union. Ultimately Macartney resigned from Westminster's board rather than go along with these developments.

=== Career after the Fundamentalist–Modernist Controversy ===
Macartney did not leave the Presbyterian Church in the USA when Machen did in 1936. Rather, he became president of the League of Faith, a group founded in 1931 to promote fidelity to scriptures and the Westminster Confession within the PCUSA. Macartney continued to preach his conservative message in sermons which he disseminated in pamphlets and in over forty books. He was a frequent preacher on college campuses in the following decades and was asked to deliver the Stone Foundation Lectures at Princeton, the Smythe Lectures at Columbia Theological Seminary, and the Payton Lectures at Fuller Theological Seminary. He opposed the spread of neo-orthodoxy at Princeton Theological Seminary, questioning, for instance, the decision to hire Emil Brunner. He also mentored over a dozen assistant pastors, including Harold Ockenga, the founder of the National Association of Evangelicals.

He was also a dedicated amateur historian, with an especial interest in the American Civil War.

== Death ==
He died on February 19, 1957, at Geneva College.

== Selected Books by Clarence E. Macartney ==
=== Historical Works ===
- A History of the First Presbyterian Church of Paterson, New Jersey
- Grant and His Generals
- Grant and His Generals (essay index reprint series)
- Highways and Byways of the Civil War
- Lincoln and His Cabinet
- Lincoln and His Generals
- Lincoln and His Generals (selected bibliographies reprint series)
- Men Who Missed It: Great Americans Who Missed the White House
- Mr. Lincoln's Admirals
- Not Far From Pittsburgh: Places and Personalities of the Land Beyond the Alleghenies
- The Bonapartes in America
- Western Pennsylvania Magazine June 1937 : First Republican convention (Horace Greeley, Andrew Carnegie, etc.), First Shadyside Charcoal, *Pennsylvania Constitutional Convention 1837, Merchants of Pittsburgh 1759–1800
- Where the Rivers Meet; Striking Personalities in History of Western Pennsylvania

=== Religious Works ===
- Along Life's Highway
- Bible Epitaphs
- Chariots of Fire: And Other Sermons on Bible Characters
- Christian Faith and the Spirit of the Age
- Chosen Twelve Plus One
- Facing Life and Getting the Best of It
- Great Characters of the Bible
- Great Interviews of Jesus
- Great Nights of the Bible
- Great Sermons of the Word
- Great Women of the Bible
- He Chose Twelve
- Macartney's Illustrations: Illustrations from the Sermons of Clarence Edward Macartney
- More Sermons from Life
- Mountains and Mountain Men of the Bible
- Of Them He Chose Twelve
- Paul the Man, His Life, His Message, His Ministry
- Peter and His Lord: Twenty-One Sermons on the Life of Peter
- Prayer at the Golden Altar
- Preaching Without Notes
- Putting on Immortality: Reflections on the Life Beyond
- Salute Thy Soul: Thirteen Sermons on Biblical Texts
- Sermons from Life
- Sermons on Old Testament Heroes
- Strange Texts, But Grand Truths
- Ten Great Men of the Bible
- The Faith Once Delivered: Fifteen Timeless Messages on Basic Christian Beliefs
- The Greatest Men of the Bible
- The Greatest Questions of the Bible and of Life
- The Greatest Texts of the Bible - Sermons on the Basic Truths of Scripture
- The Greatest Words in the Bible and in Human Speech
- The Lamb of God: Previously Unpublished Sermons by Clarence E. Macartney
- The Lord's Prayer
- The Making of a Minister: The Autobiography of Clarence E. Macartney
- The Minister's Son; A Record of His Achievements
- The Parables of the Old Testament
- The Parables of the Old Testament (classic reprint)
- The Prayers of the Old Testament
- The Ten Commandments
- The Trials of Great Bible Characters
- The Way of a Man with a Maid (Macartney bible characters library)
- The Wisest Fool and Other Men of the Bible
- The Woman of Tekoah and Other Sermons on Bible Characters
- Trials of Great Men of the Bible
- Twelve Great Questions About Christ
- What Jesus Really Taught
- Wrestlers with God: Prayers of the Old Testament
- You Can Conquer

== Sources ==
- Gatiss, L (2008). Christianity and the Tolerance of Liberalism: J.Gresham Machen and the Presbyterian Controversy of 1922-1937. London, Latimer Trust ISBN 978-0-946307-63-0
- The Presbyterian Controversy: Fundamentalists, Modernists, and Moderates by Bradley J. Longfield (1991)
- Crossed Fingers: How the Liberals Captured the Presbyterian Church by Gary North (1996)

Religious titles
Preceded by The Rev. Charles F. Wishart	Moderator of the 136th General Assembly of the Presbyterian Church in the United States of America; 1924–1925	Succeeded by The Rev. Charles R. Erdman
