= McArthur Township, Logan County, Ohio =

Township in Ohio, US

- Township
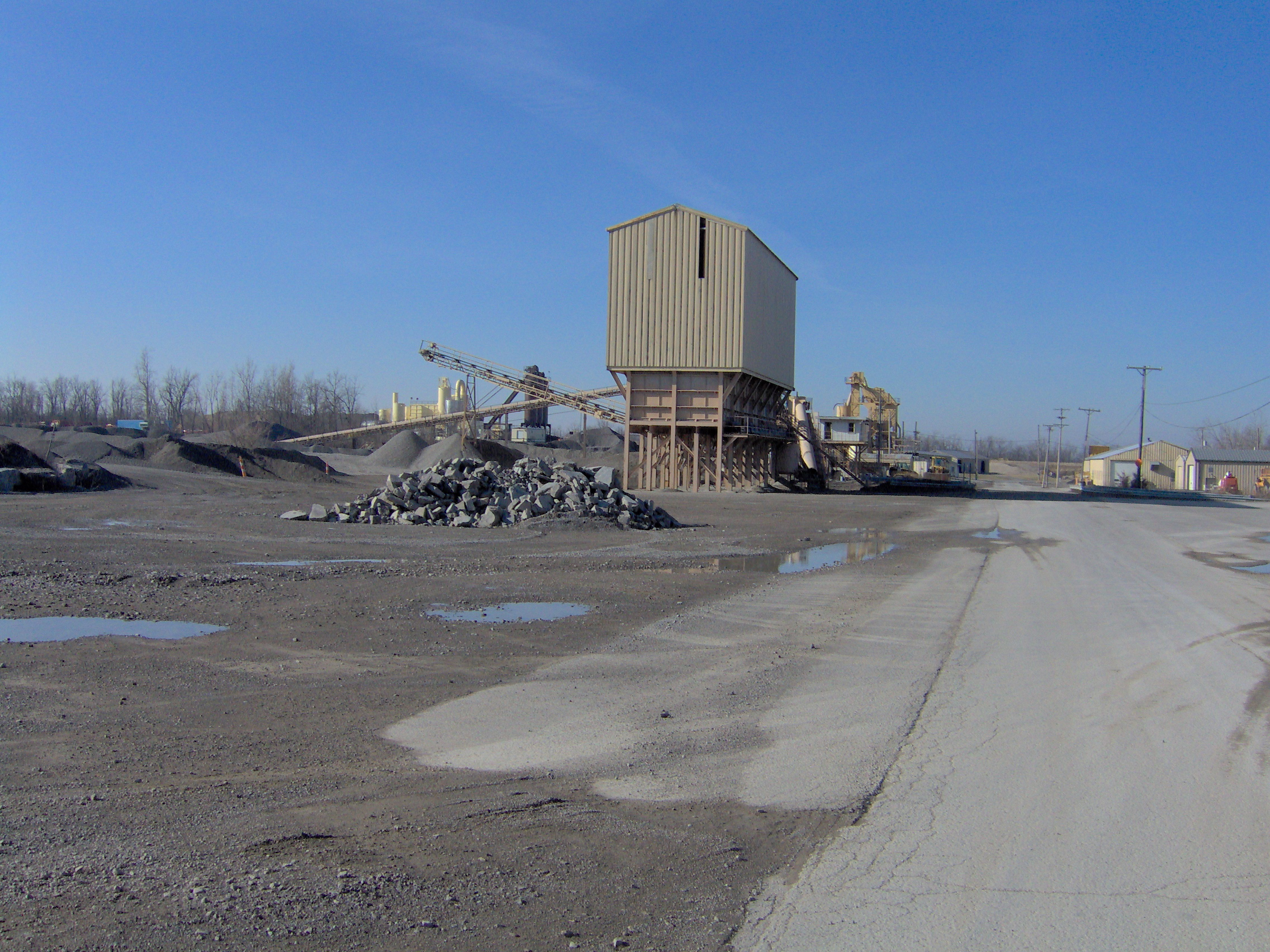
- A quarry in northern McArthur Township

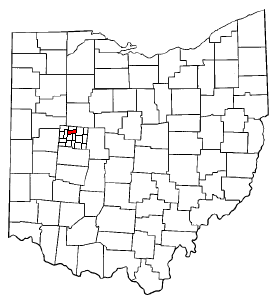
- Location of McArthur Township in Ohio

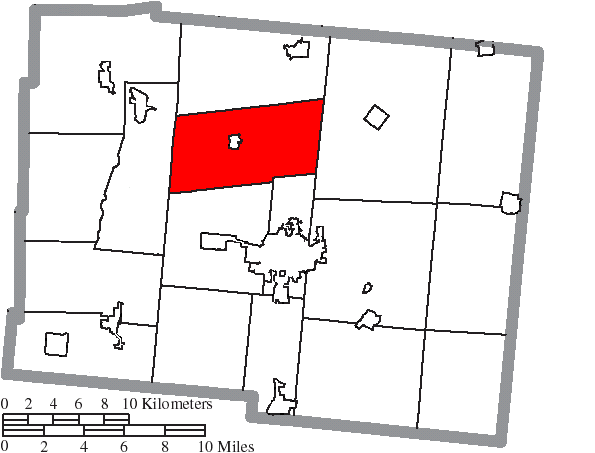
- Location of McArthur Township in Logan County
- Coordinates: 40°26′2″N 83°47′18″W
- Country: United States
- State: Ohio
- County: Logan

Area
  - Total: 27.24 sq mi (70.55 km^{2})
  - Land: 27.17 sq mi (70.38 km^{2})
  - Water: 0.066 sq mi (0.17 km^{2})
- Elevation: 1,191 ft (363 m)

Population (2020)
  - Total: 1,920
  - Density: 70.7/sq mi (27.3/km^{2})
- Time zone: UTC-5 (Eastern (EST))
  - Summer (DST): UTC-4 (EDT)
- Area codes: 937, 326
- FIPS code: 39-45682
- GNIS feature ID: 1086487

McArthur Township is one of the seventeen townships of Logan County, Ohio, United States. As of the 2020 census, the population was 1,920.

== Geography ==
Located in the northern part of the county, it borders the following townships:

- Richland Township - north
- Rushcreek Township - east
- Lake Township - southeast
- Harrison Township - southwest
- Washington Township - west

The village of Huntsville is located in central McArthur Township, and the unincorporated community of Northwood is located in the township's northeast, along the border with Richland Township.

== Name and history ==
McArthur Township was organized in 1823, and was named for Ohio politician Duncan McArthur. It is the only McArthur Township statewide.

== Government ==
The township is governed by a three-member board of trustees, who are elected in November of odd-numbered years to a four-year term beginning on the following January 1. Two are elected in the year after the presidential election and one is elected in the year before it. There is also an elected township fiscal officer, who serves a four-year term beginning on April 1 of the year after the election, which is held in November of the year before the presidential election. Vacancies in the fiscal officership or on the board of trustees are filled by the remaining trustees.

== Transportation ==
Important highways in McArthur Township include U.S. Routes 33 and 68, and State Routes 117, 274, and 638, along with a small part of State Route 366.
