= Rushsylvania, Ohio =

- Village
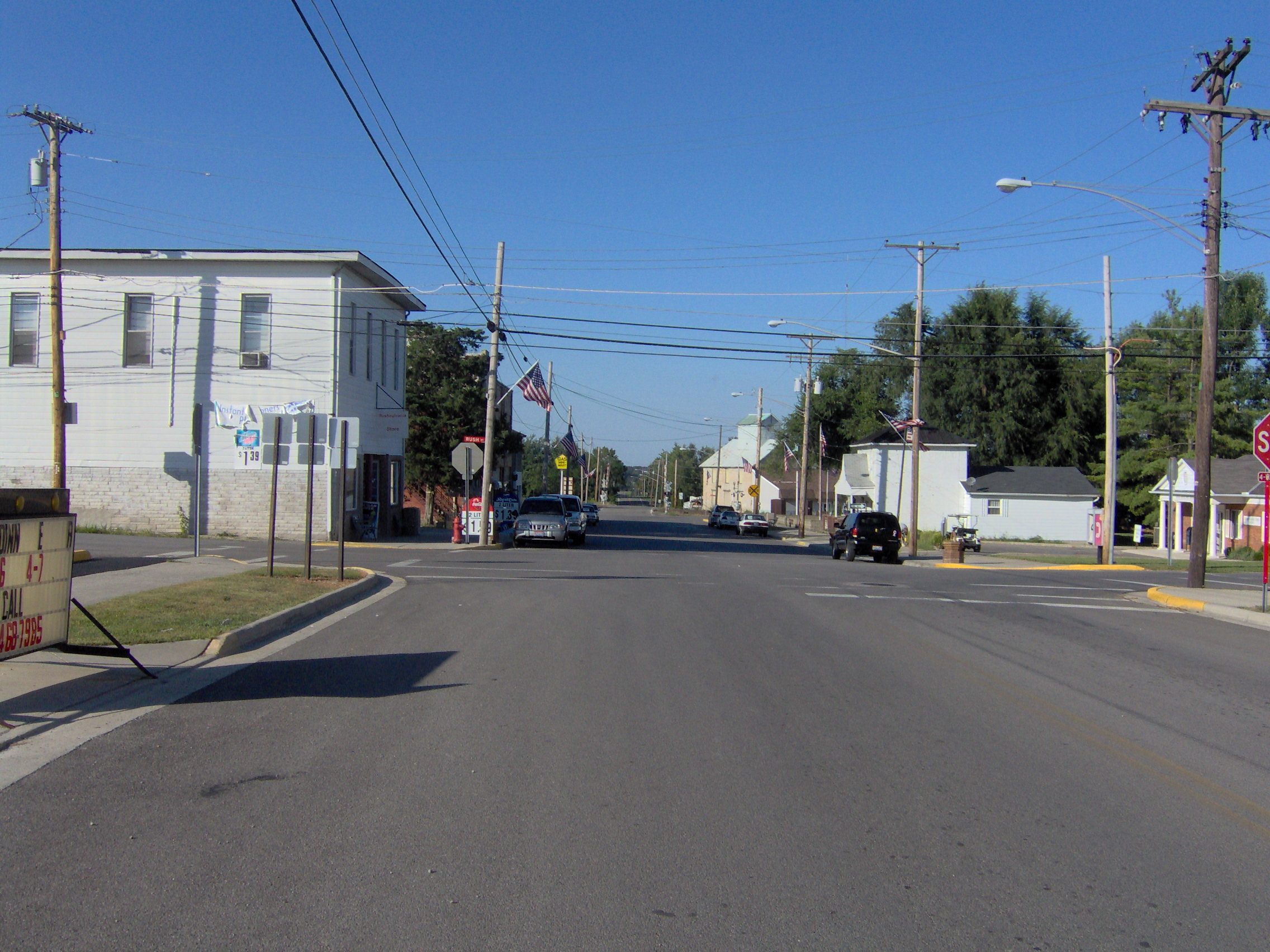
- Along the main street in Rushsylvania's small business district

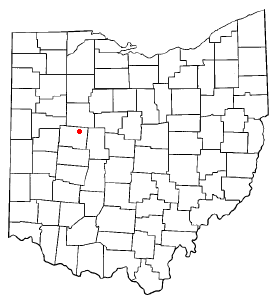
- Location of Rushsylvania, Ohio

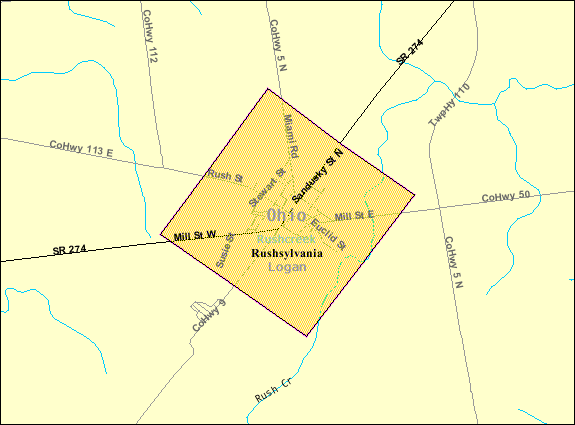
- Detailed map of Rushsylvania
- Coordinates: 40°27′41″N 83°40′16″W
- Country: United States
- State: Ohio
- County: Logan
- Township: Rushcreek

Area
  - Total: 0.78 sq mi (2.03 km^{2})
  - Land: 0.78 sq mi (2.03 km^{2})
  - Water: 0 sq mi (0.00 km^{2})
- Elevation: 1,253 ft (382 m)

Population (2020)
  - Total: 491
  - Density: 675/sq mi (260.7/km^{2})
- Time zone: UTC-5 (Eastern (EST))
  - Summer (DST): UTC-4 (EDT)
- ZIP code: 43347
- Area codes: 937, 326
- FIPS code: 39-69176
- GNIS feature ID: 2399143
- Website: https://rushsylvaniaoh.com/

Rushsylvania is a village located in Logan County, Ohio, United States. The population was 491 at the 2020 census.

A branch of the Logan County District Library serves the Rushsylvania community.

== History ==
Rushylvania was originally called Claggstown, and under the latter name was platted in 1834. A post office called Rushylvania has been in operation since 1836.

== Geography ==
According to the United States Census Bureau, the village has a total area of 0.78 square miles (2.02 km^{2}), all of it land.

== Economy ==
Among the businesses in Rushsylvania is Michael Angelo's Pizza, which is owned by and employs winners of national and worldwide pizza-making competitions.

== Demographics ==
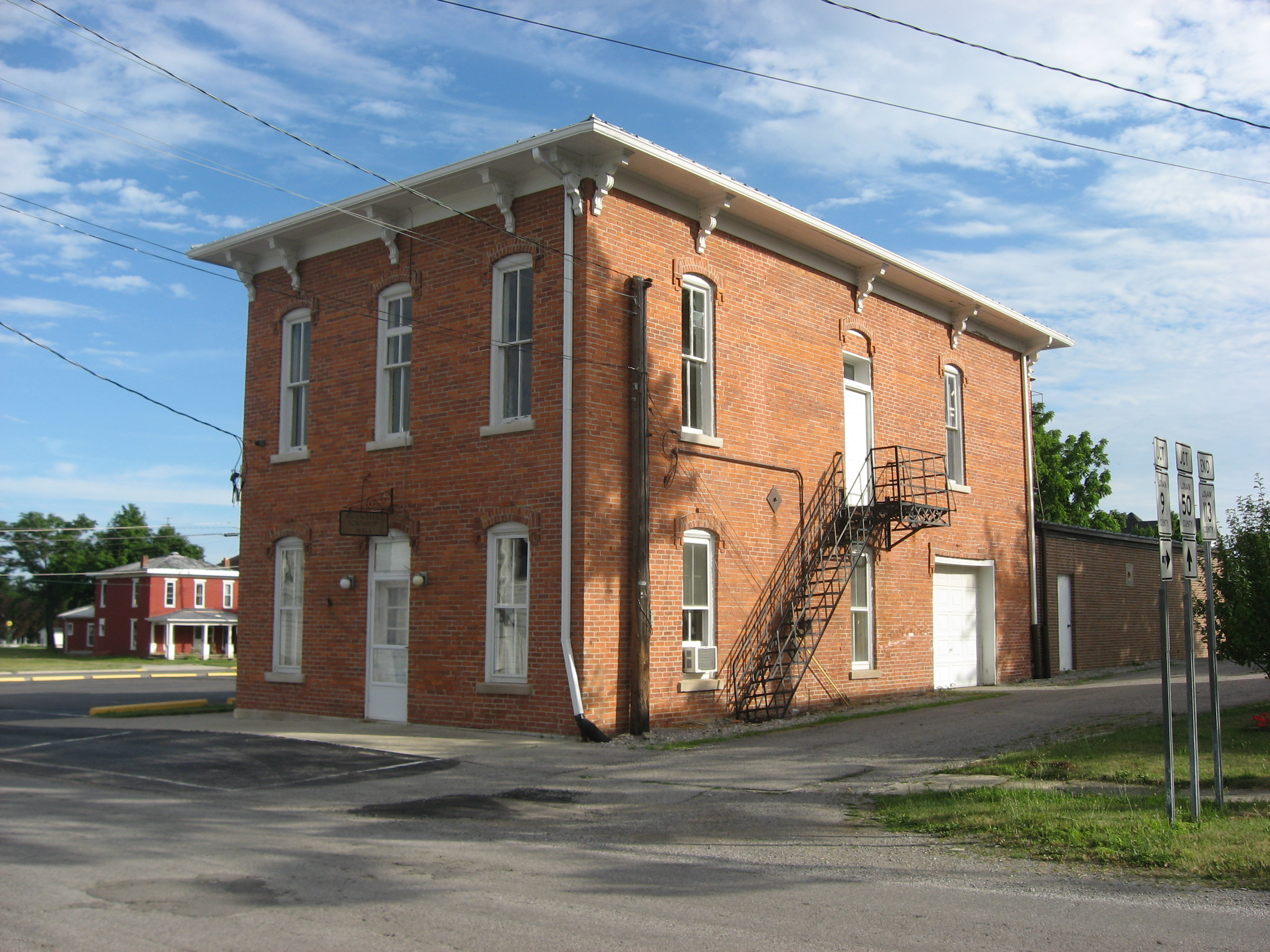
Rushsylvania Village Hall

Historical population
Census	Pop.	Note	%±
1870	310		—
1880	445		43.5%
1890	497		11.7%
1900	552		11.1%
1910	560		1.4%
1920	479		−14.5%
1930	507		5.8%
1940	560		10.5%
1950	563		0.5%
1960	601		6.7%
1970	526		−12.5%
1980	610		16.0%
1990	573		−6.1%
2000	543		−5.2%
2010	516		−5.0%
2020	491		−4.8%
U.S. Decennial Census

=== 2010 census ===
As of the census of 2010, there were 516 people, 194 households, and 146 families living in the village. The population density was 661.5 inhabitants per square mile (255.4/km^{2}). There were 219 housing units at an average density of 280.8 per square mile (108.4/km^{2}). The racial makeup of the village was 96.5% White, 0.8% Native American, 0.6% Asian, 0.6% from other races, and 1.6% from two or more races. Hispanic or Latino of any race were 0.6% of the population.

There were 194 households, of which 41.2% had children under the age of 18 living with them, 58.8% were married couples living together, 10.8% had a female householder with no husband present, 5.7% had a male householder with no wife present, and 24.7% were non-families. 20.6% of all households were made up of individuals, and 8.8% had someone living alone who was 65 years of age or older. The average household size was 2.66 and the average family size was 3.08.

The median age in the village was 37.3 years. 27.9% of residents were under the age of 18; 8.7% were between the ages of 18 and 24; 25.3% were from 25 to 44; 26.2% were from 45 to 64; and 12% were 65 years of age or older. The gender makeup of the village was 48.4% male and 51.6% female.

=== 2000 census ===
As of the census of 2000, there were 543 people, 200 households, and 151 families living in the village. The population density was 716.7 inhabitants per square mile (276.7/km^{2}). There were 218 housing units at an average density of 287.7 per square mile (111.1/km^{2}). The racial makeup of the village was 97.79% White, 0.18% African American, 0.55% Native American, 0.37% Asian, and 1.10% from two or more races. Hispanic or Latino of any race were 0.74% of the population.

There were 200 households, out of which 35.5% had children under the age of 18 living with them, 61.5% were married couples living together, 8.5% had a female householder with no husband present, and 24.5% were non-families. 21.5% of all households were made up of individuals, and 8.5% had someone living alone who was 65 years of age or older. The average household size was 2.72 and the average family size was 3.13.

In the village, the population was spread out, with 29.1% under the age of 18, 10.7% from 18 to 24, 26.7% from 25 to 44, 21.7% from 45 to 64, and 11.8% who were 65 years of age or older. The median age was 33 years. For every 100 females, there were 100.4 males. For every 100 females age 18 and over, there were 96.4 males.

The median income for a household in the village was $44,333, and the median income for a family was $45,469. Males had a median income of $33,021 versus $27,083 for females. The per capita income for the village was $16,426. About 5.8% of families and 10.9% of the population were below the poverty line, including 14.0% of those under age 18 and 11.9% of those age 65 or over.

== Transportation ==
State Route 274 is the main street in Rushsylvania.

== Notable people ==
- Tony Core - former Ohio state legislator
- John W. Grabiel - former Arkansas politician
