= Rushcreek Township, Logan County, Ohio =

Township in Ohio, US

- Township
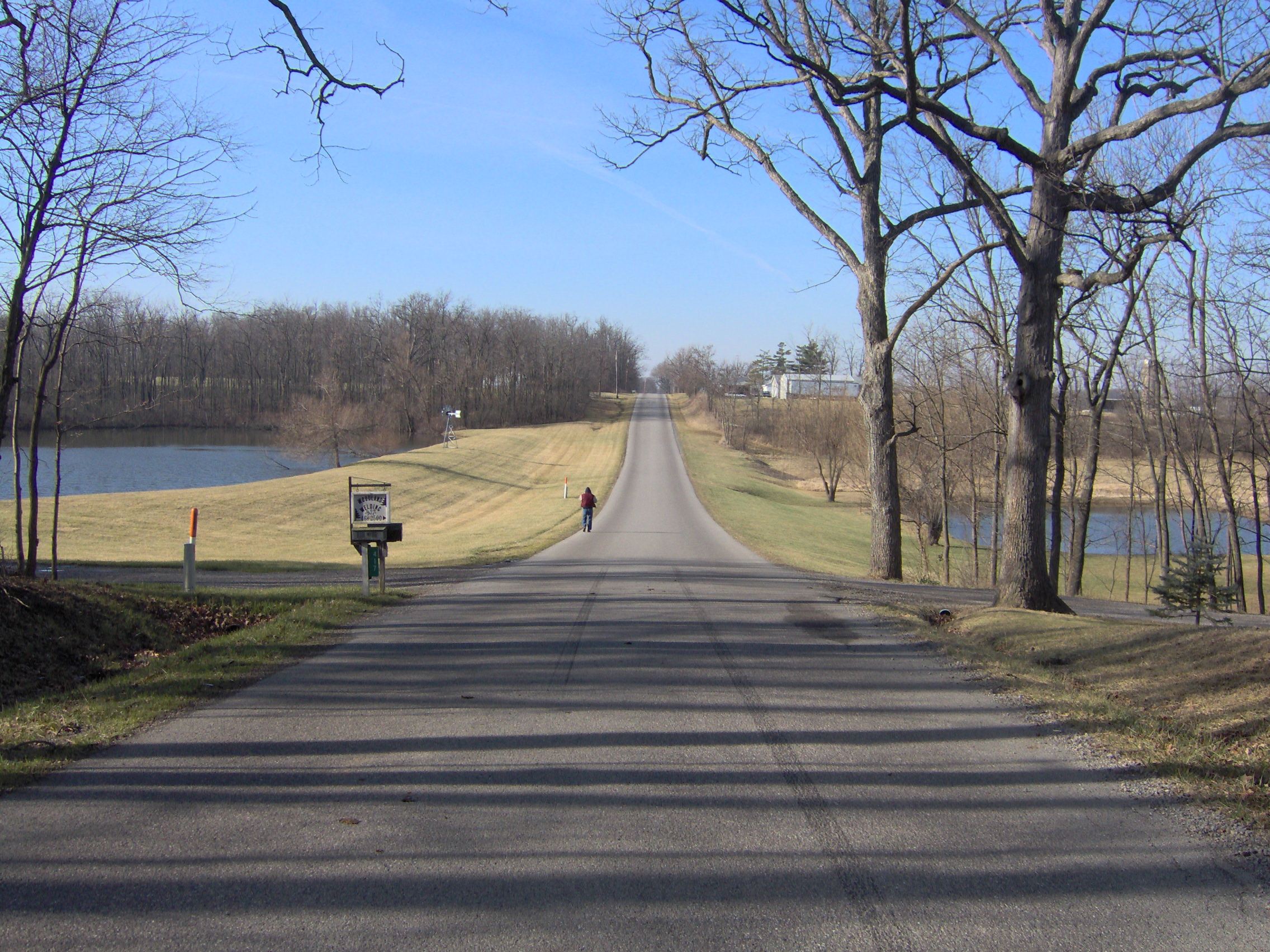
- Rushcreek Township is hillier than Logan County's more westerly townships.

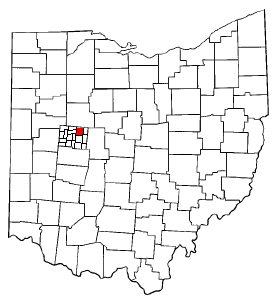
- Location of Rushcreek Township in Ohio

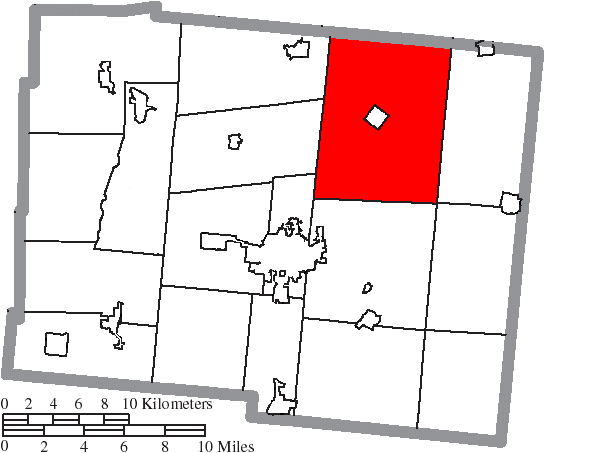
- Location of Rushcreek Township in Logan County
- Coordinates: 40°27′42″N 83°40′11″W
- Country: United States
- State: Ohio
- County: Logan

Area
  - Total: 49.07 sq mi (127.08 km^{2})
  - Land: 49.02 sq mi (126.95 km^{2})
  - Water: 0.050 sq mi (0.13 km^{2})
- Elevation: 1,106 ft (337 m)

Population (2020)
  - Total: 2,153
  - Density: 43.92/sq mi (16.96/km^{2})
- Time zone: UTC-5 (Eastern (EST))
  - Summer (DST): UTC-4 (EDT)
- Area codes: 937, 326
- FIPS code: 39-69134
- GNIS feature ID: 1086493

Rushcreek Township is one of the seventeen townships of Logan County, Ohio, United States. As of the 2020 census, the population was 2,153.

== Geography ==
Located in the northeastern part of the county, it borders the following townships:

- Taylor Creek Township, Hardin County - north
- Bokes Creek Township - east
- Perry Township - southeast
- Jefferson Township - south
- Lake Township - southwest
- McArthur Township - west
- Richland Township - northwest

The village of Rushsylvania is located in central Rushcreek Township.

== Name and history ==
Rushcreek Township was organized in 1827. It is the only Rushcreek Township statewide, although there are Rush Townships in Champaign, Scioto, and Tuscarawas counties, and a Rush Creek Township in Fairfield County.

== Government ==
The township is governed by a three-member board of trustees, who are elected in November of odd-numbered years to a four-year term beginning on the following January 1. Two are elected in the year after the presidential election and one is elected in the year before it. There is also an elected township fiscal officer, who serves a four-year term beginning on April 1 of the year after the election, which is held in November of the year before the presidential election. Vacancies in the fiscal officership or on the board of trustees are filled by the remaining trustees.

== Transportation ==
U.S. Route 68 is the most important highway in Rushcreek Township. Other significant highways include State Routes 47, 273, and 274.
