= Mack Scogin Merrill Elam =

- Founded: 1984
- Headquarters: Atlanta, Georgia
- Key people: Mack Scogin; Merrill Elam
- Website: msmearch.com

Mack Scogin Merrill Elam Architects is an American architecture firm based in Atlanta, Georgia. The two principal architects are husband and wife Mack Scogin and Merrill Elam. The firm was founded in 1984 as Parker and Scogin, but was reorganized as Scogin Elam and Bray until 2000, when it became Mack Scogin Merrill Elam Architects. The architects are well known for their modernist buildings, often playing on polemical themes. The architects have received numerous architectural prizes and awards for their works.

== History ==
The firm was founded in 1984 as Parker and Scogin. It later became Scogin, Elam and Bray (with Mack Scogin, Merrill Elam and Lloyd Bray). It became Mack Scogin Merrill Elam Architects in 2000.

Mack Scogin studied architecture at Georgia Institute of Technology and became Professor of Architecture at Harvard University Graduate School of Design, where he was chairman of the Department of Architecture from 1990 to 1995.

Merrill Elam first studied architecture at Georgia Institute of Technology, completing a Bachelor of Architecture degree in 1971, before completing a master's degree in business administration at Georgia State University in 1982. She has held several positions in schools of architecture in the USA and Canada.

== Notable works ==
- United States Courthouse, Austin, Texas (2012)
- Carnegie Mellon University Gates and Hillman Centers (2011)
- One Midtown Plaza Lobby, Atlanta, Georgia (2007)
- Yale University Health Services Center, Yale University, New Haven, Connecticut (2006)
- Lulu Chow Wang Campus Center and Davis Garage, Wellesley College (2006)
- Ernie Davis Hall, Syracuse University, Syracuse, New York (2005)
- Harvard University Allston Campus and First Science Buildings — Harvard University, Cambridge, Massachusetts (2005)
- Gates Center for Computer Science, Carnegie Mellon University, Pittsburgh, Pennsylvania (2005)
- Carroll A. Campbell Jr. Graduate Engineering Center, Clemson University, Greenville, South Carolina (2004)
- Zhongkai Sheshan Villas, Shanghai, China (2004)
- Jean Grae Hargrove Music Library, University of California, Berkeley (2004)
- Knowlton Hall, Austin E. Knowlton School of Architecture, Ohio State University (2004)
- Bailey HouseStudio (2003)
- Mountain Tree House, Dillard, Georgia, (2003)
- Willow Street Residence Hall, Tulane University (2003)
- Lee B. Philmon Branch Library (2003)
- U.S. Federal Courthouse, General Services Administration, Austin, Texas, 2003
- Nomentana Residence (1999)
- Clark Atlanta University Art Galleries (1996)
- Don and Sylvia Shaw Salon and Spa (1996)
- John J. Ross – William C. Blakley Law Library, Arizona State University (1994)
- Buckhead Branch Library (1993)
- Turner Village at the Candler School of Theology, Emory University (1992)
- House Chmar (1992)
- Carol Cobb Turner Branch Library (1992)
- Clayton County Headquarters Library (Scogin Elam and Bray Architects, 1988)
- High Museum at Georgia-Pacific Center (1988)

== Awards ==
- Mark Scogin and Merrill Elam, Shutze Medal, Georgia Institute of Technology, 2013
- Mark Scogin and Merrill Elam, Cooper-Hewitt National Design Award for Architecture with Mack Scogin, 2012
- Mark Scogin and Merrill Elam, Arnold W. Brunner Memorial Prize in Architecture, American Academy of Arts and Letters with Mack Scogin, 2011
- Mark Scogin and Merrill Elam, Arts and Letters Award in Architecture, American Academy of Arts and Letters, 1995

== Publications ==
- Mark Linder, Scogin Elam & Bray. Rizzoli, New York, 1992.
- Jason Smart (ed.), Mack & Merrill: The Work of Scogin Elam and Bray Architects, Michigan Architecture Papers, no.7, University of Michigan College of Architecture + Urban Planning, 1999.
- Todd Gannon, Teresa Ball (eds), Mack Scogin/Merrill Elam: Knowlton Hall, Chronicle Books, 2005.
