= Richland Township, Logan County, Ohio =

Township in Ohio, US

- Township
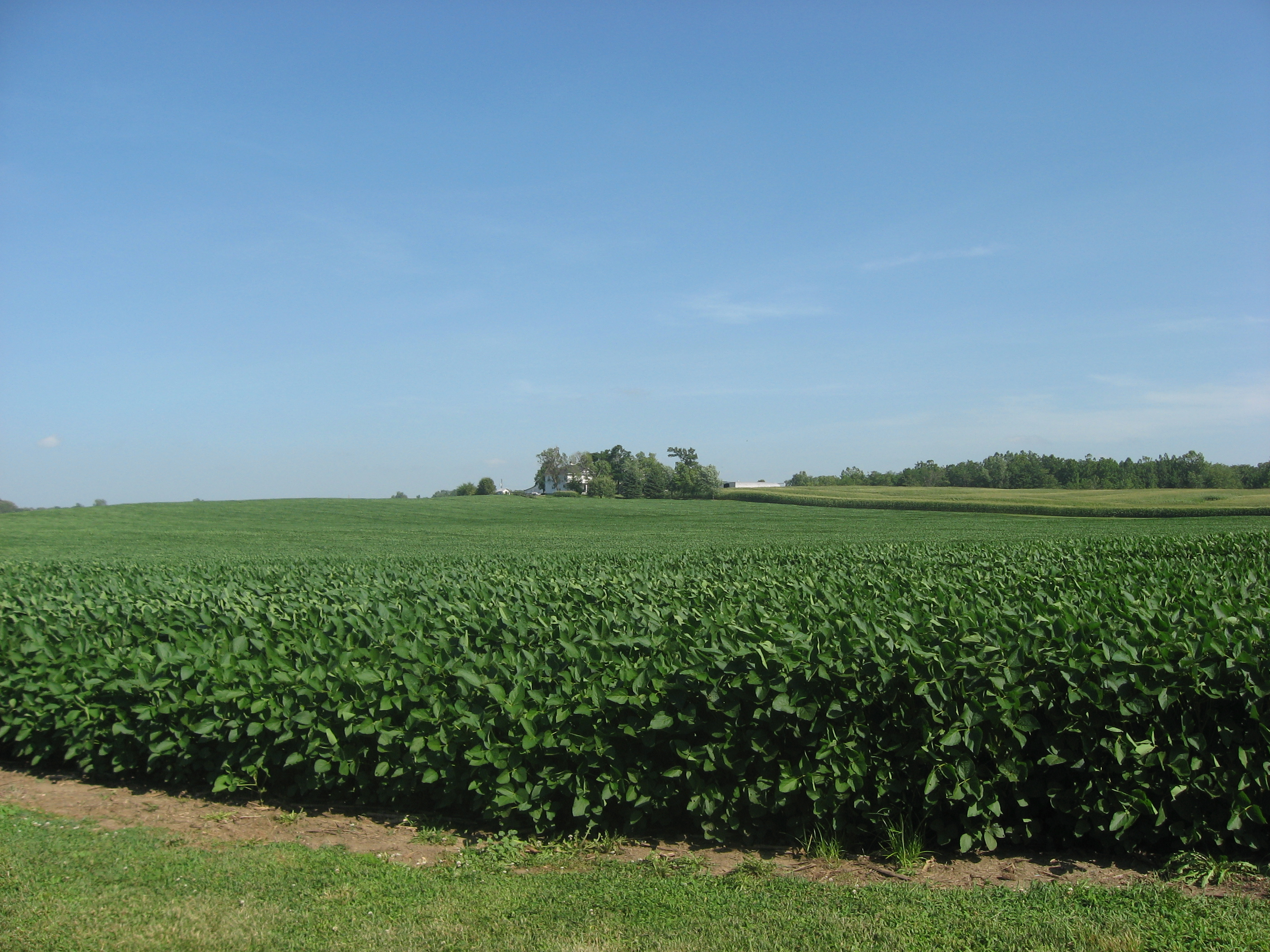
- Richland Township is generally a flat area of farm fields.

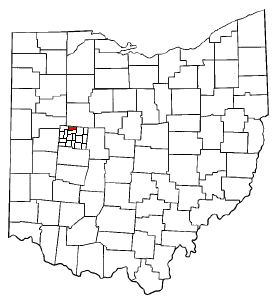
- Location of Richland Township in Ohio

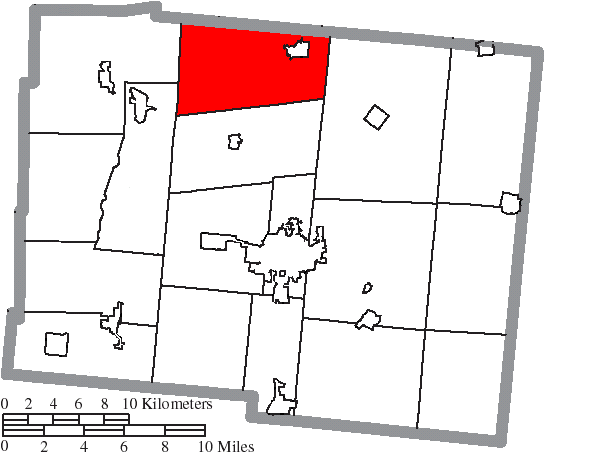
- Location of Richland Township in Logan County
- Coordinates: 40°29′53″N 83°47′57″W
- Country: United States
- State: Ohio
- County: Logan

Area
  - Total: 29.8 sq mi (77.3 km^{2})
  - Land: 29.0 sq mi (75.2 km^{2})
  - Water: 0.81 sq mi (2.1 km^{2})
- Elevation: 1,040 ft (320 m)

Population (2020)
  - Total: 2,645
  - Density: 91.1/sq mi (35.2/km^{2})
- Time zone: UTC-5 (Eastern (EST))
  - Summer (DST): UTC-4 (EDT)
- Area codes: 937, 326
- FIPS code: 39-66740
- GNIS feature ID: 1086492

Richland Township is one of the seventeen townships of Logan County, Ohio, United States. As of the 2020 census, the population was 2,645.

== Geography ==
Located in the northern part of the county, it borders the following townships:

- McDonald Township, Hardin County - north
- Taylor Creek Township, Hardin County - northeast
- Rushcreek Township - east
- McArthur Township - south
- Washington Township - southwest
- Stokes Township - west
- Roundhead Township, Hardin County - northwest

The village of Belle Center is located in northern Richland Township, and the unincorporated community of Northwood lies in the township's southeast, along the border with McArthur Township.

The eastern part of Indian Lake is located in western Richland Township.

== Name and history ==
Richland Township was organized in 1844. It is one of twelve Richland Townships statewide.

== Government ==
The township is governed by a three-member board of trustees, who are elected in November of odd-numbered years to a four-year term beginning on the following January 1. Two are elected in the year after the presidential election and one is elected in the year before it. There is also an elected township fiscal officer, who serves a four-year term beginning on April 1 of the year after the election, which is held in November of the year before the presidential election. Vacancies in the fiscal officership or on the board of trustees are filled by the remaining trustees.

== Transportation ==
Important highways in Richland Township include State Routes 117, 235, 273, 366, and 368.

The township is the location of the Bickham Covered Bridge, which carries County Road 38 over the South Fork of the Miami River. Built in 1877 and refurbished in 1959, it employs the Howe truss design. The bridge's length is 94 feet (29 m).
