= Ridgemont High School (Ohio) =

Ridgemont Junior - Senior High School
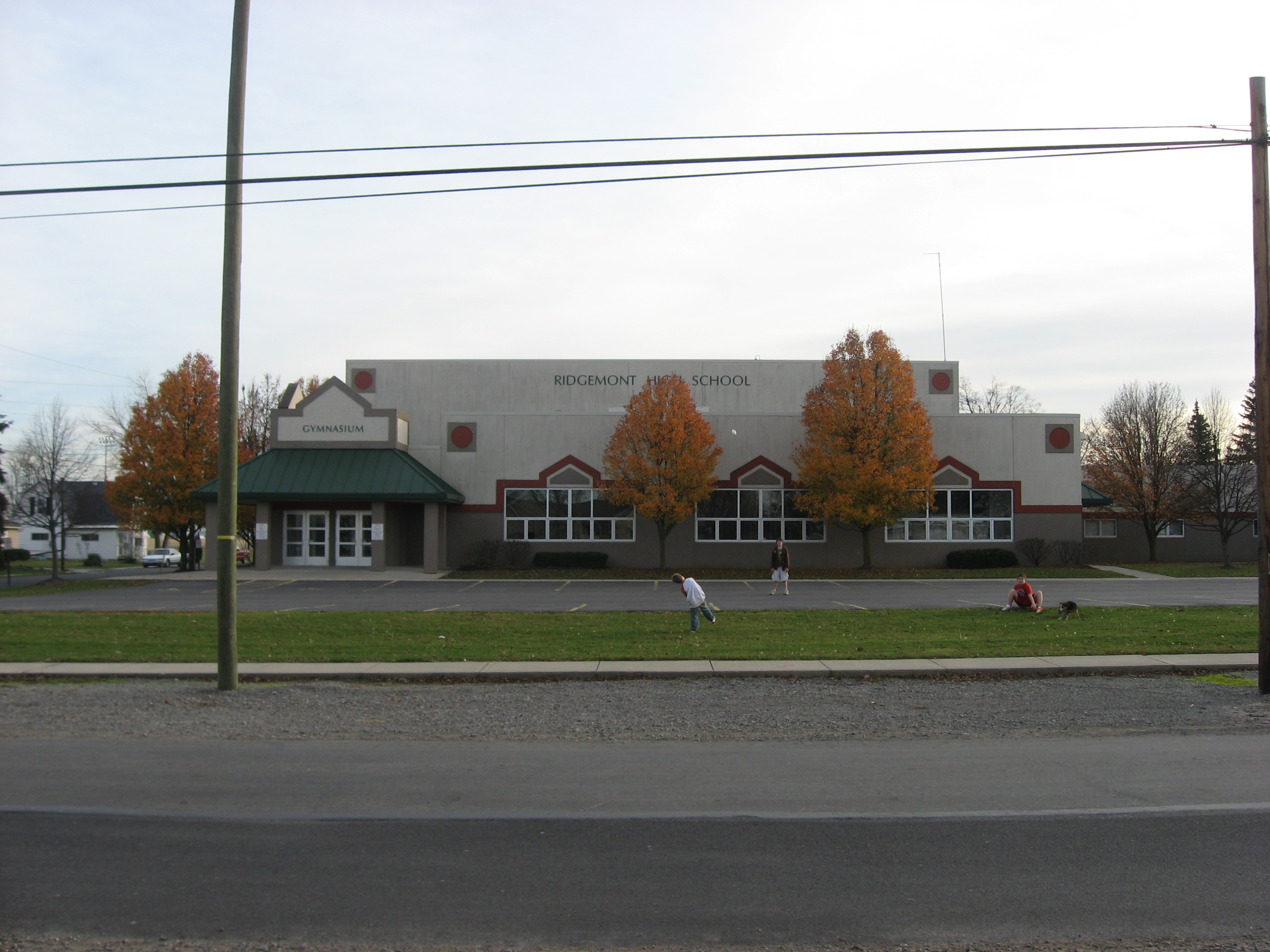
- Front of Ridgemont High School

Location
- 560 West Taylor Street; Mt. Victory, (Hardin County), Ohio 43340; United States
- Coordinates: 40°32′0″N 83°31′42″W

Information
- Type: Public, Coeducational high school
- School district: Ridgemont Local Schools
- Superintendent: Brian Hogan
- Principal: Nick Stuck
- Teaching staff: 15.10 (FTE)
- Grades: 7-12
- Enrollment: 247 (2024-2025)
- Average class size: 35
- Student to teacher ratio: 16.36
- Colors: Green and Gold
- Fight song: Ridgemont Fight Song
- Athletics conference: Northwest Central Conference
- Sports: Football, Volleyball, Basketball, Golf, Cheerleading, Marching Band, Track and Field, Baseball, Softball.
- Mascot: Goldie the Gopher
- Team name: Golden Gophers
- Newspaper: The Gopher Gazette
- Website: www.ridgemont.k12.oh.us
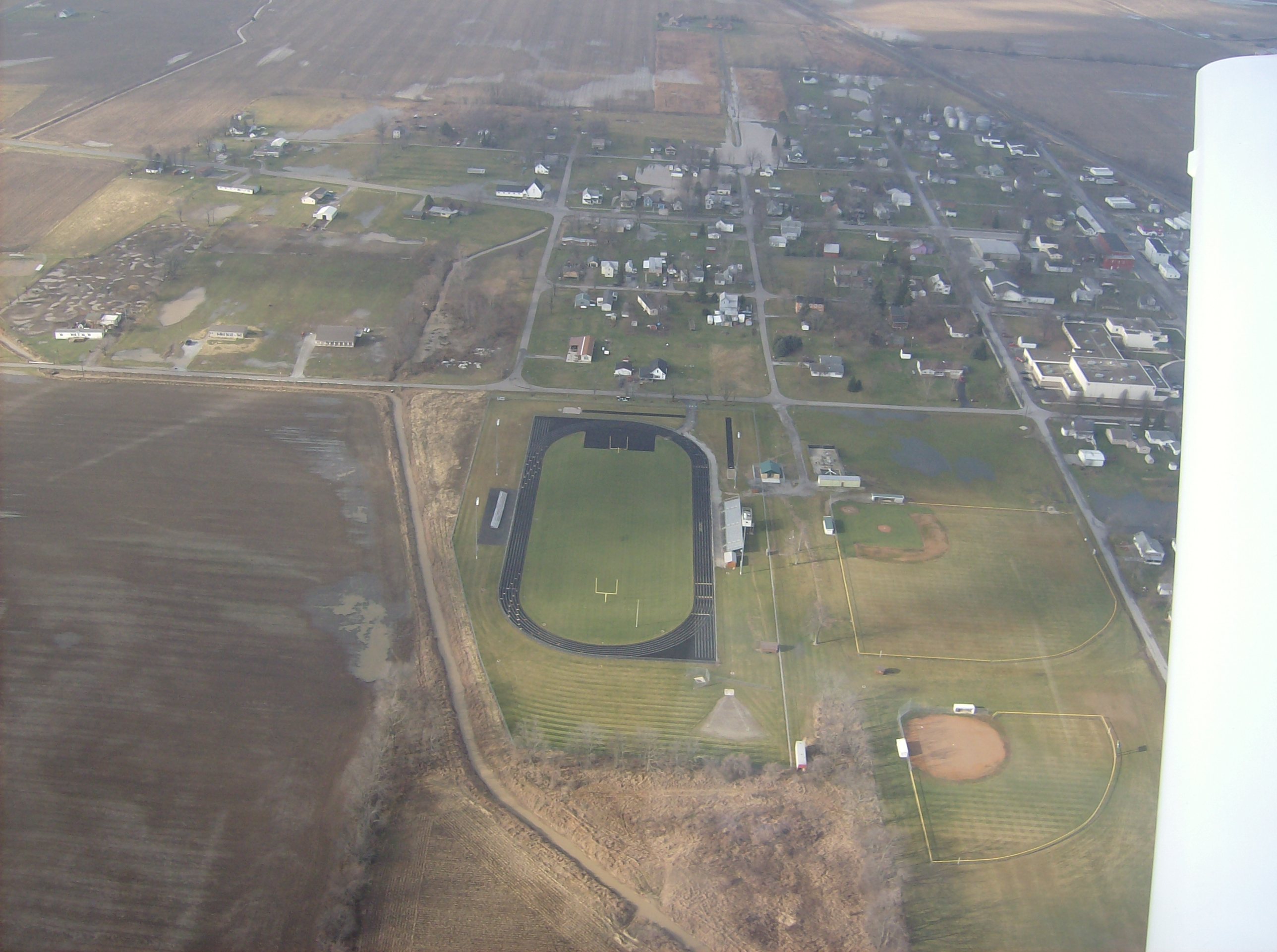
- Ridgemont High School's athletic fields

Ridgemont High School is a public high school in Mt. Victory, Ohio. It is the only high school in the Ridgemont Local Schools district. Their nickname is the Golden Gophers, a distinction they share with only two other high schools in The United States, Hueytown High School in Hueytown, Alabama and Pavilion High School in Pavilion, New York.
