= Belle Center, Ohio =

- Village
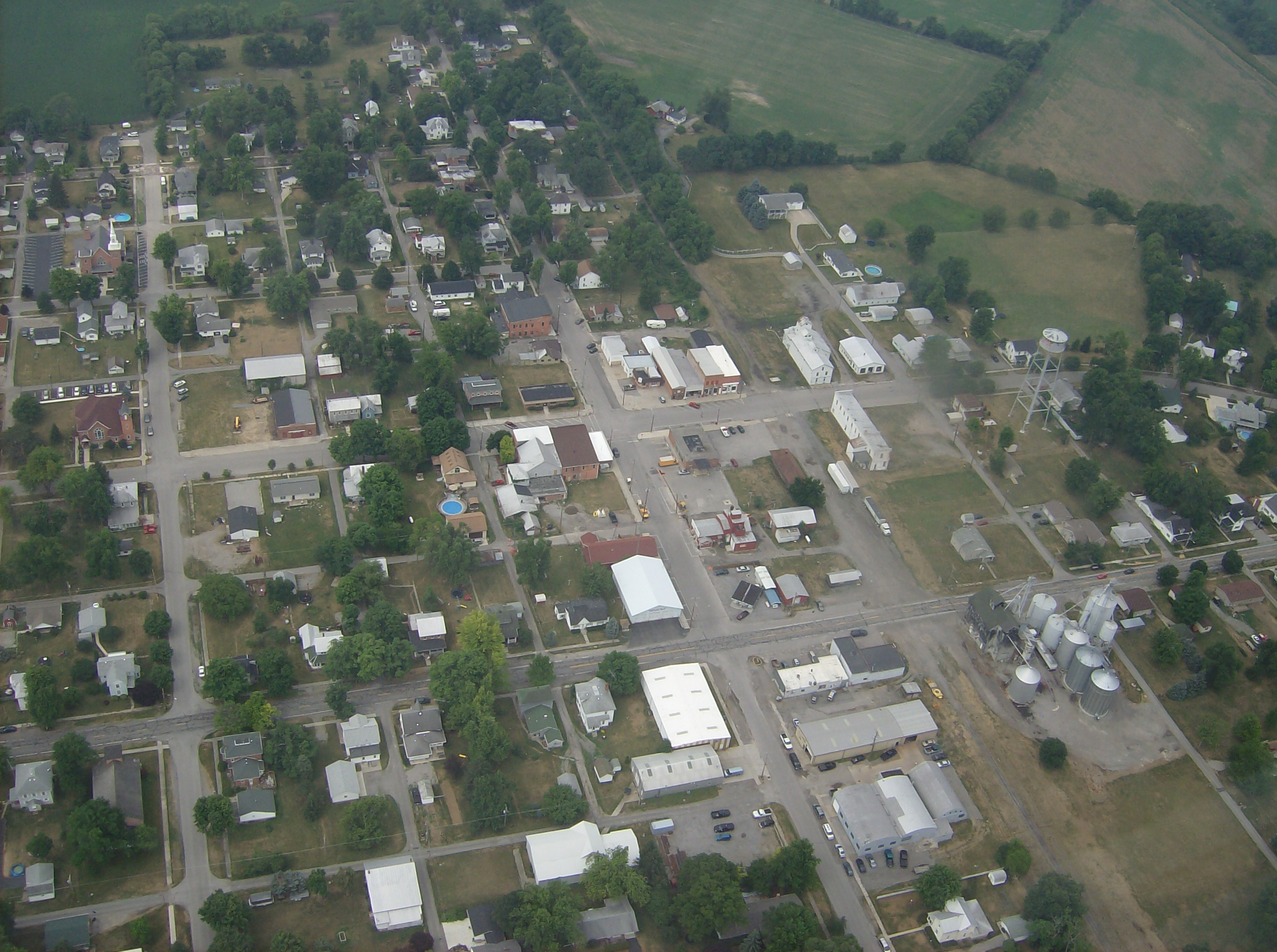
- Aerial picture of "downtown" Belle Center

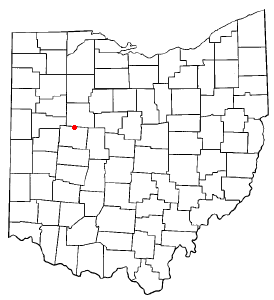
- Location of Belle Center, Ohio

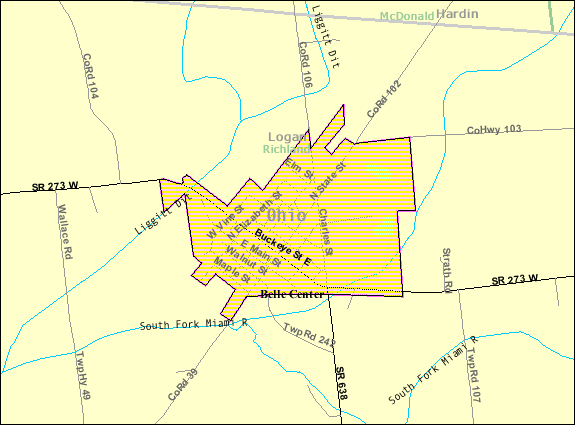
- Detailed map of Belle Center
- Coordinates: 40°30′30″N 83°44′58″W
- Country: United States
- State: Ohio
- County: Logan
- Township: Richland

Government
  - Mayor: Lance Houchin

Area
  - Total: 0.71 sq mi (1.84 km^{2})
  - Land: 0.70 sq mi (1.81 km^{2})
  - Water: 0.012 sq mi (0.03 km^{2})
- Elevation: 1,043 ft (318 m)

Population (2020)
  - Total: 809
  - Estimate (2023): 805
  - Density: 1,159.1/sq mi (447.54/km^{2})
- Time zone: UTC-5 (Eastern (EST))
  - Summer (DST): UTC-4 (EDT)
- ZIP code: 43310
- Area codes: 937, 326
- FIPS code: 39-05116
- GNIS feature ID: 2398075
- Website: bellecenterohio.com

Belle Center is a village in Logan County, Ohio, United States. The population was 809 at the 2020 census. It is a Tree City USA, one of the smallest in the state.

== History ==
Historically, some areas in what is now northern Richland Township were covered by swampland. During the 1840s, however, settlers moved in, and a town was platted around 1846, by which time a small town named Richland had become well established in the southern part of what is now Richland Township. In this year, the Mad River and Lake Erie Railroad began to plan for a railroad line through the area. A competition developed between the two towns for the location of a water stop for the railroad (essentially requiring the basics of a station), which eventually was won by the upstart town. Five years later, the village of Belle Center was officially incorporated by the Ohio General Assembly. The presence of the railroad led to growth for Belle Center but decline for Richland (since renamed New Richland). This railroad origin is responsible for Belle Center's "diagonal" street layout.

=== Etymology ===
Belle Center was named for its relatively central location between the cities of Bellefontaine and Kenton. Historically, the community's name has also been spelled Belle Centre, Bellecenter, and even Bellecente. The Board on Geographic Names officially decided in favor of the current spelling in 1891.

== Geography ==
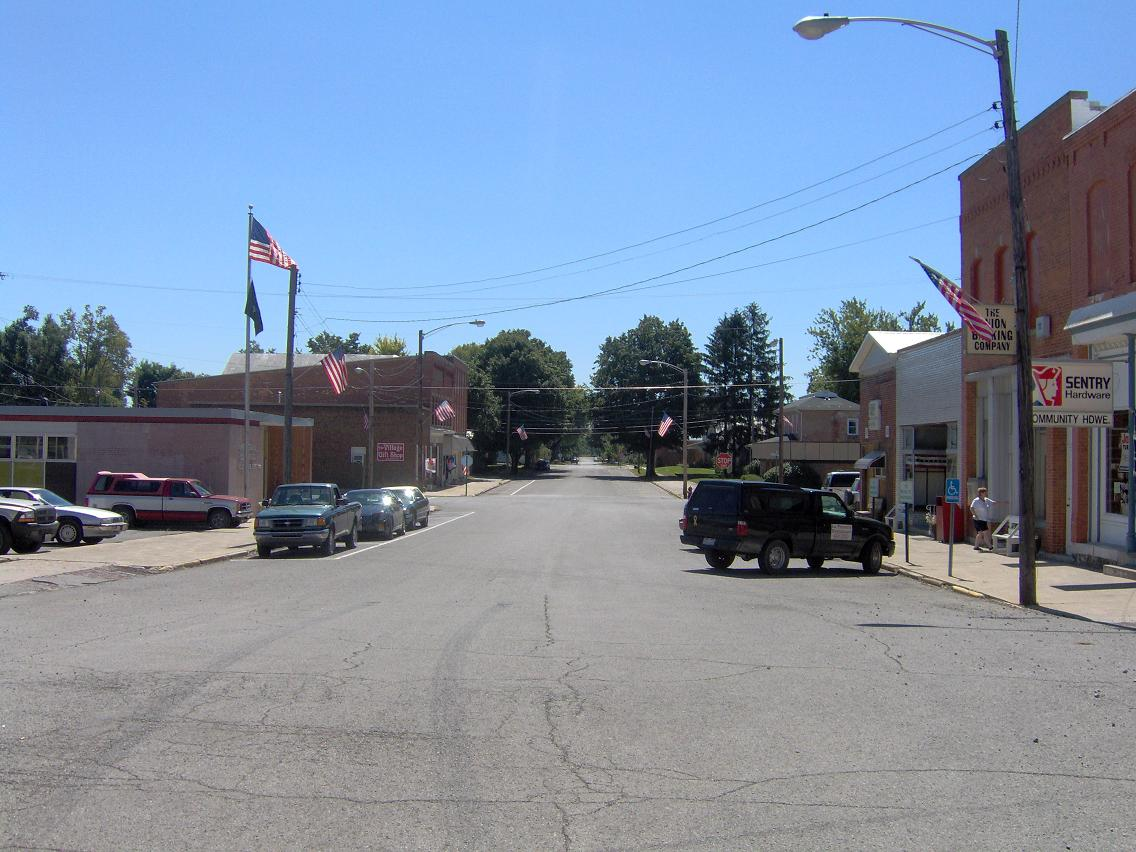
View of Belle Center's small business district, taken from atop a former railroad crossing.

According to the United States Census Bureau, the village has a total area of 0.71 square miles (1.84 km^{2}), of which, 0.70 square miles (1.81 km^{2}) is land and 0.01 square miles (0.03 km^{2}) is water.

== Demographics ==
Historical population
Census	Pop.	Note	%±
1850	153		—
1860	234		52.9%
1870	276		17.9%
1880	434		57.2%
1890	927		113.6%
1900	962		3.8%
1910	889		−7.6%
1920	909		2.2%
1930	861		−5.3%
1940	835		−3.0%
1950	889		6.5%
1960	949		6.7%
1970	985		3.8%
1980	930		−5.6%
1990	796		−14.4%
2000	807		1.4%
2010	813		0.7%
2020	809		−0.5%
2023 (est.)	805	▼	−0.5%
U.S. Decennial Census

=== 2010 census ===
As of the census of 2010, there were 813 people, 322 households, and 232 families living in the village. The population density was 1,161.4 inhabitants per square mile (448.4/km^{2}). There were 345 housing units at an average density of 492.9 per square mile (190.3/km^{2}). The racial makeup of the village was 98.2% White, 0.1% African American, 0.1% Native American, 0.2% Asian, 0.2% from other races, and 1.1% from two or more races. Hispanic or Latino of any race were 0.6% of the population.

There were 322 households, of which 36.3% had children under the age of 18 living with them, 54.0% were married couples living together, 13.4% had a female householder with no husband present, 4.7% had a male householder with no wife present, and 28.0% were non-families. 23.3% of all households were made up of individuals, and 11.2% had someone living alone who was 65 years of age or older. The average household size was 2.50 and the average family size was 2.88.

The median age in the village was 37.2 years. 26.6% of residents were under the age of 18; 5.4% were between the ages of 18 and 24; 28% were from 25 to 44; 24.7% were from 45 to 64; and 15.5% were 65 years of age or older. The gender makeup of the village was 48.1% male and 51.9% female.

=== 2000 census ===
As of the census of 2000, there were 807 people, 326 households, and 241 families living in the village. The population density was 1,171.0 inhabitants per square mile (452.1/km^{2}). There were 345 housing units at an average density of 500.6 per square mile (193.3/km^{2}). The racial makeup of the village was 99.88% White and 0.12% from other races. Hispanic or Latino of any race were 0.74% of the population.

There were 326 households, out of which 34.0% had children under the age of 18 living with them, 60.7% were married couples living together, 9.8% had a female householder with no husband present, and 25.8% were non-families. 24.5% of all households were made up of individuals, and 12.0% had someone living alone who was 65 years of age or older. The average household size was 2.45 and the average family size was 2.88.

In the village, the population was spread out, with 25.9% under the age of 18, 7.1% from 18 to 24, 29.7% from 25 to 44, 21.3% from 45 to 64, and 16.0% who were 65 years of age or older. The median age was 36 years. For every 100 females there were 93.1 males. For every 100 females age 18 and over, there were 86.9 males.

The median income for a household in the village was $45,486, and the median income for a family was $48,594. Males had a median income of $36,467 versus $28,846 for females. The per capita income for the village was $20,173. About 6.0% of families and 8.5% of the population were below the poverty line, including 11.9% of those under the age of 18 and 5.8% of those 65 and older.

== Government ==
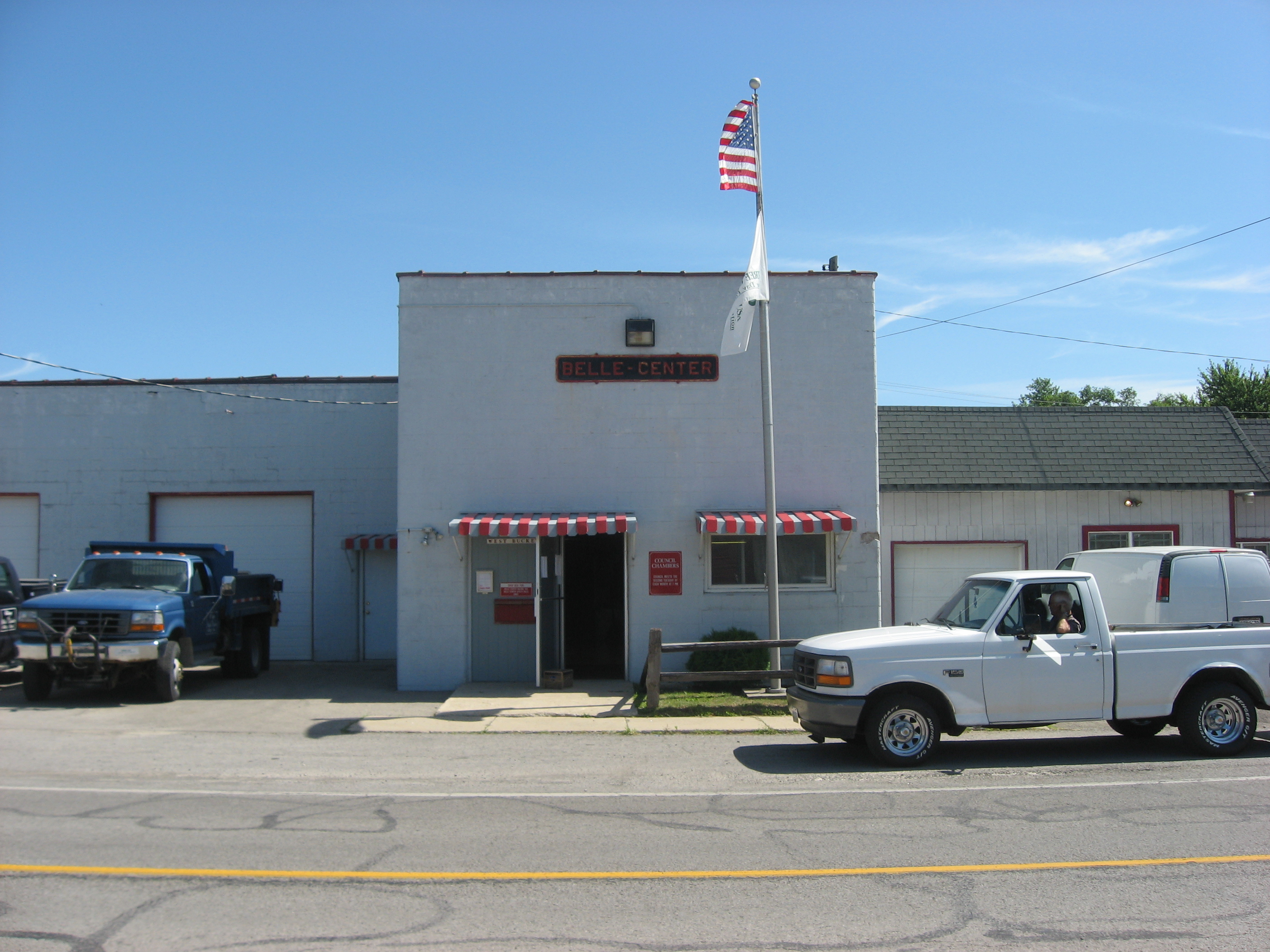
Belle Center Village Hall

As of 2007, the mayor of Belle Center was Donald Ruble. In the elections of November 2007, Teresa Johnston defeated two other candidates for the mayoral position, and Rhonda Fulmer and John Lowery were elected from a five-candidate pool for two at-large village council seats.

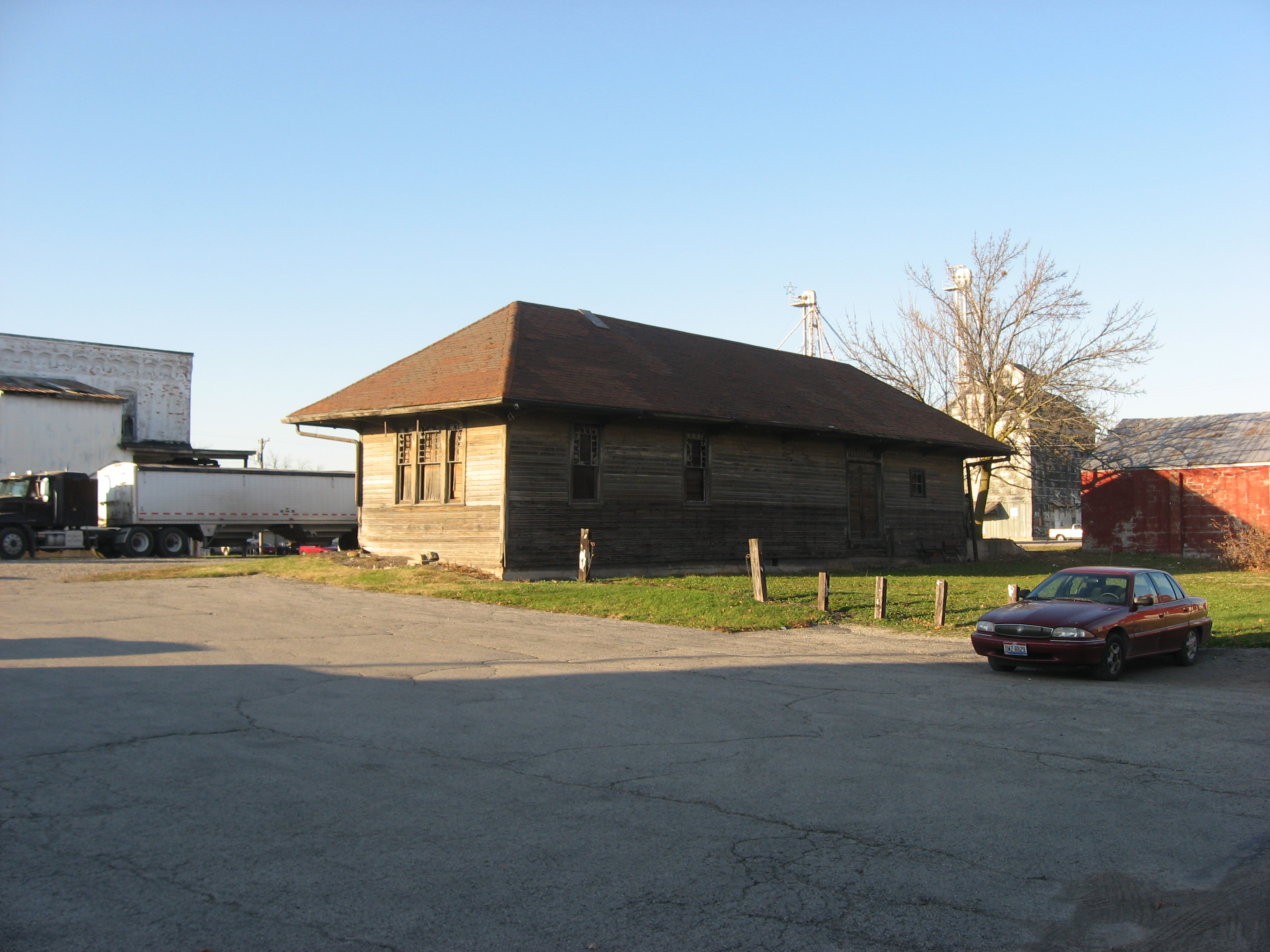
Old Belle Center Depot

== Transportation ==
Belle Center was founded as a stop along a railroad. Since the end of passenger rail service, transportation in Belle Center has relied on local roads and state highways. Today, State Route 273 forms Belle Center's main street, and the north end of State Route 638 is at an intersection with State Route 273 at the southern corner of Belle Center.

== Education ==
Belle Center has a public library, the Belle Center Public Library.

== Notable people ==
- Henry Wilson Temple, a Republican member of the United States House of Representatives from Pennsylvania.
- Betty White lived in Belle Center for a brief time in 1945.
