= Mount Victory, Ohio =

- Village
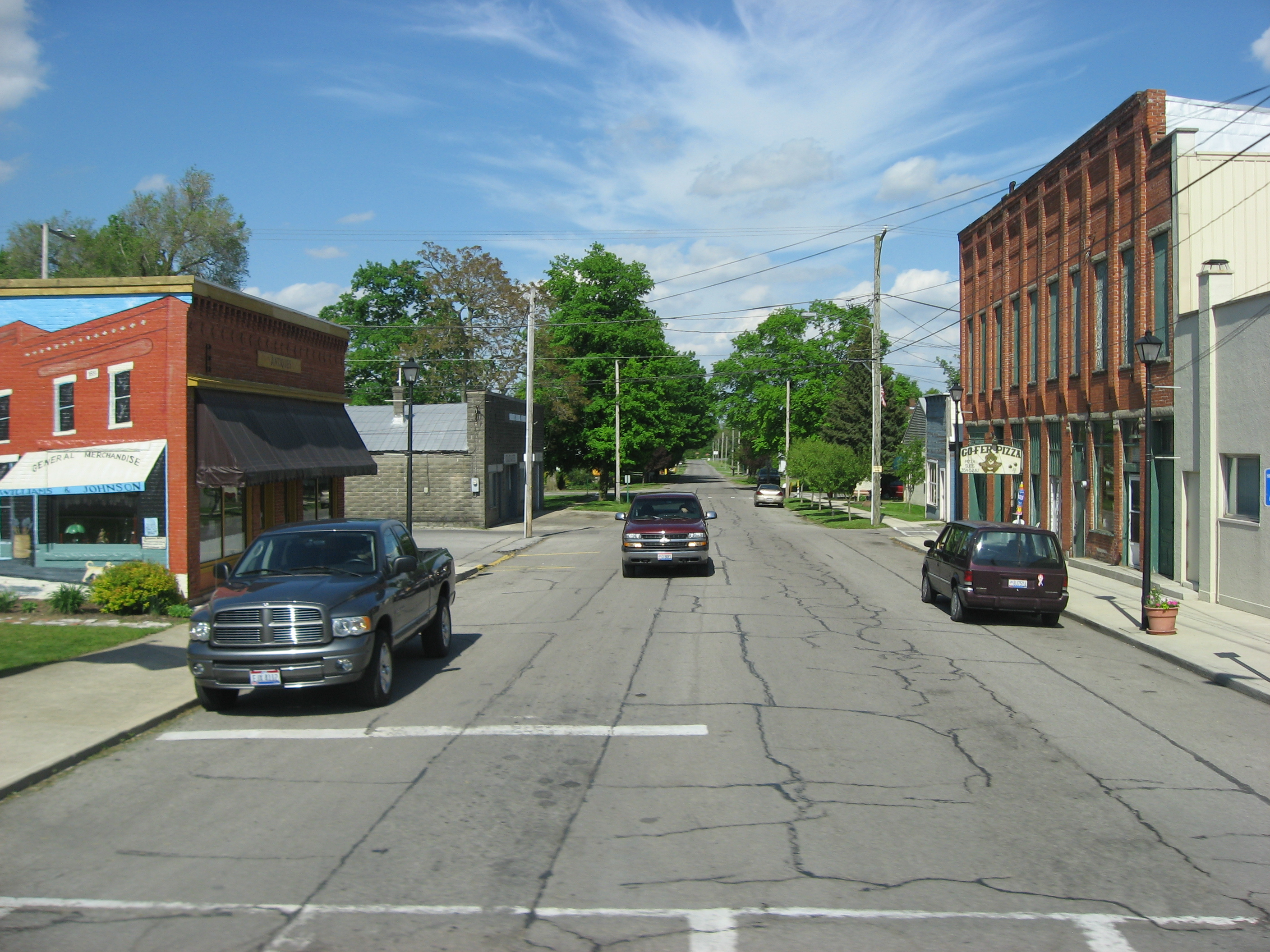
- Downtown Mount Victory

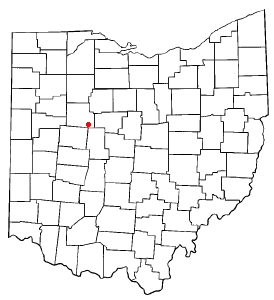
- Location of Mount Victory, Ohio

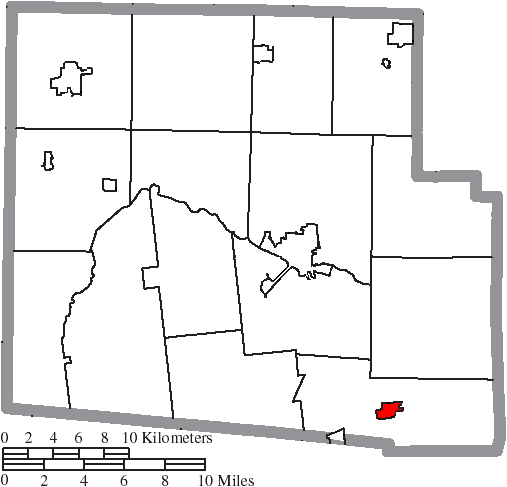
- Location of Mount Victory in Hardin County
- Coordinates: 40°32′01″N 83°31′16″W
- Country: United States
- State: Ohio
- County: Hardin
- Township: Hale

Area
  - Total: 0.85 sq mi (2.19 km^{2})
  - Land: 0.85 sq mi (2.19 km^{2})
  - Water: 0 sq mi (0.00 km^{2})
- Elevation: 1,040 ft (320 m)

Population (2020)
  - Total: 601
  - Density: 712.1/sq mi (274.94/km^{2})
- Time zone: UTC-5 (Eastern (EST))
  - Summer (DST): UTC-4 (EDT)
- ZIP code: 43340
- Area codes: 937, 326
- FIPS code: 39-53144
- GNIS feature ID: 2399418
- Website: www.mountvictory.com

Mount Victory is a village in Hardin County, Ohio, United States. The population was 601 at the 2020 census.

== History ==
The town site of Mount Victory was surveyed in 1851, one year before the railroad was extended to that point. The village received its name by reason of the proprietor shouting "Victory!" when he obtained the land. A post office has been in operation at Mount Victory since 1854.

== Education ==
Mount Victory is home to the Ridgemont High School, the only school in the Ridgemont Local Schools district.

Mount Victory has a public library, a branch of the Ridgemont Public Library.

== Geography ==
According to the United States Census Bureau, the village has a total area of 0.77 square miles (1.99 km^{2}), all land.

== Demographics ==
Historical population
Census	Pop.	Note	%±
1880	574		—
1890	689		20.0%
1900	734		6.5%
1910	740		0.8%
1920	723		−2.3%
1930	597		−17.4%
1940	645		8.0%
1950	609		−5.6%
1960	598		−1.8%
1970	633		5.9%
1980	667		5.4%
1990	551		−17.4%
2000	600		8.9%
2010	627		4.5%
2020	601		−4.1%
U.S. Decennial Census

=== 2010 census ===
As of the census of 2010, there were 627 people, 249 households, and 172 families living in the village. The population density was 814.3 inhabitants per square mile (314.4/km^{2}). There were 279 housing units at an average density of 362.3 per square mile (139.9/km^{2}). The racial makeup of the village was 98.1% White, 0.6% African American, 0.5% Asian, 0.5% from other races, and 0.3% from two or more races. Hispanic or Latino of any race were 1.1% of the population.

There were 249 households, of which 34.1% had children under the age of 18 living with them, 53.8% were married couples living together, 9.6% had a female householder with no husband present, 5.6% had a male householder with no wife present, and 30.9% were non-families. 24.9% of all households were made up of individuals, and 8% had someone living alone who was 65 years of age or older. The average household size was 2.52 and the average family size was 2.95.

The median age in the village was 37.3 years. 25.4% of residents were under the age of 18; 8.3% were between the ages of 18 and 24; 25.1% were from 25 to 44; 24.9% were from 45 to 64; and 16.3% were 65 years of age or older. The gender makeup of the village was 49.3% male and 50.7% female.

=== 2000 census ===
As of the census of 2000, there were 600 people, 245 households, and 171 families living in the village. The population density was 791.3 inhabitants per square mile (305.5/km^{2}). There were 263 housing units at an average density of 346.8 per square mile (133.9/km^{2}). The racial makeup of the village was 98.83% White, 0.17% African American, and 1.00% from two or more races. Hispanic or Latino of any race were 0.83% of the population.

There were 245 households, out of which 32.7% had children under the age of 18 living with them, 51.8% were married couples living together, 12.2% had a female householder with no husband present, and 30.2% were non-families. 25.7% of all households were made up of individuals, and 11.0% had someone living alone who was 65 years of age or older. The average household size was 2.45 and the average family size was 2.86.

In the village, the population was spread out, with 25.5% under the age of 18, 9.8% from 18 to 24, 28.8% from 25 to 44, 21.2% from 45 to 64, and 14.7% who were 65 years of age or older. The median age was 35 years. For every 100 females there were 92.9 males. For every 100 females age 18 and over, there were 93.5 males.

The median income for a household in the village was $40,694, and the median income for a family was $47,273. Males had a median income of $33,571 versus $22,344 for females. The per capita income for the village was $17,745. About 3.8% of families and 6.9% of the population were below the poverty line, including 6.1% of those under age 18 and 10.8% of those age 65 or over.
