= Knowlton Hall =

Building at The Ohio State University in Columbus, Ohio, US

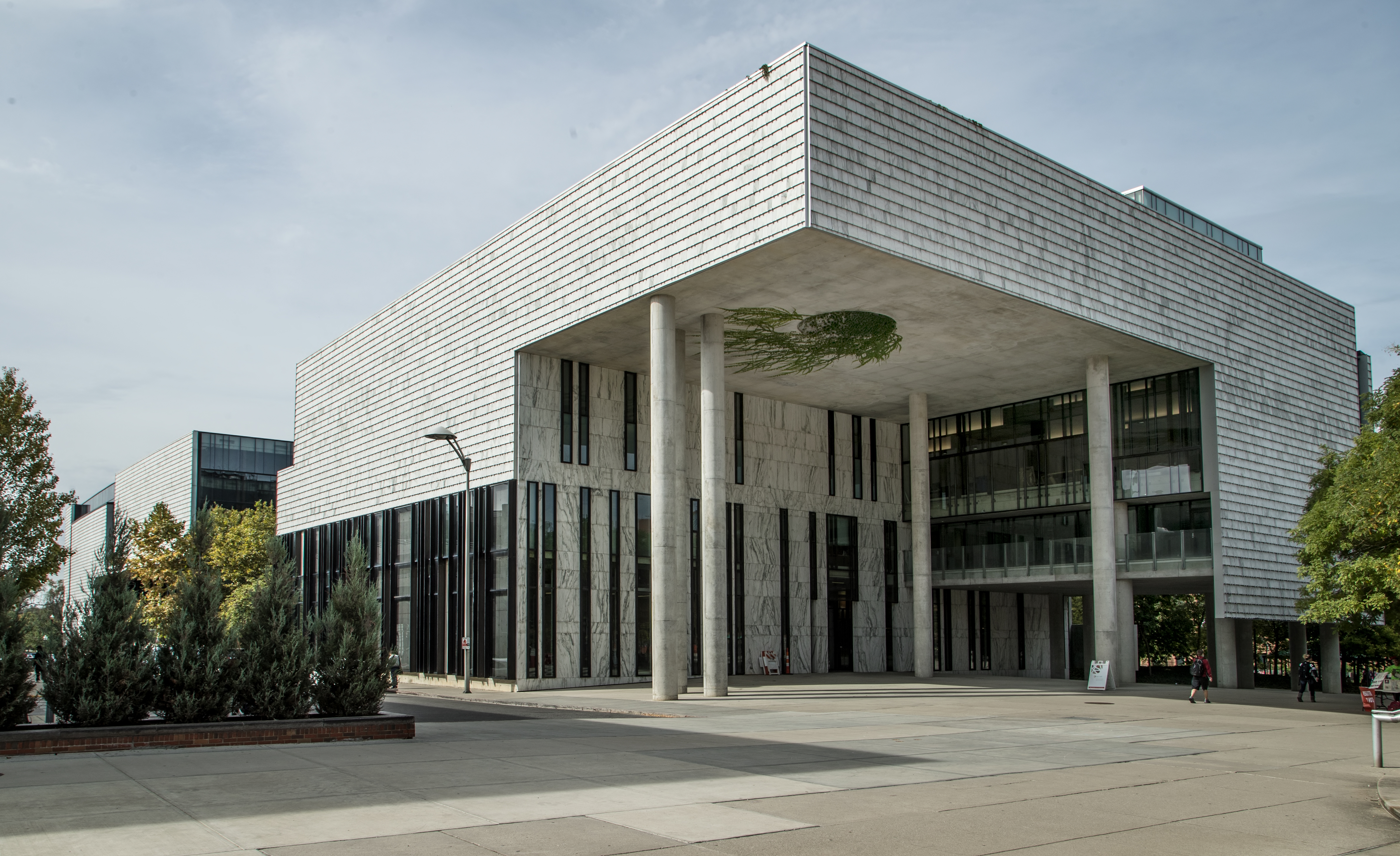
- Alternative names: Austin E. Knowlton School of Architecture, KSA

General information
- Type: School of Architecture, Landscape Architecture, and City and Regional Planning
- Architectural style: Contemporary
- Location: Ohio State University, 275 West Woodruff Avenue, Columbus OH, 43210-1138, Columbus, Ohio, United States
- Coordinates: 40.0035350°N 83.0167800°W
- Groundbreaking: April 5, 2002
- Completed: July 31, 2004
- Opened: September 2004
- Inaugurated: October 29, 2004
- Cost: $33 million

Technical details
- Structural system: Concrete and steel frame with marble shingle skin
- Floor area: 165,000 sq ft (15,300 m^{2})

Design and construction
- Architect: Mack Scogin, Merril Elam
- Architecture firm: Mack Scogin Merrill Elam Architects of Atlanta, WSA, and Michael Van Valkenburgh and Associates
- Structural engineer: Lantz, Jones & Nebraska, Inc.
- Civil engineer: Bird & Bull, Inc.
- Main contractor: P. J. Dick

Website
- knowlton.osu.edu/knowlton-hall

Knowlton Hall, located in Columbus, Ohio, United States, is the current home for the three disciplines that comprise the Austin E. Knowlton School of Architecture (KSA) at Ohio State University. The building was completed in 2004. The School of Architecture offers both undergraduate and graduate degrees in the fields of Architecture, Landscape Architecture, and City and Regional Planning. Knowlton Hall serves as the replacement for Ives Hall, the previous home of the school of architecture which was demolished in July 2002. The namesake of Knowlton Hall is Austin E. "Dutch" Knowlton. He graduated from Ohio State University in 1931 with a Bachelor's in Architectural Engineering and provided a $10 million donation that spearheaded the funding for the creation of the building.

Art and Gallery Space: Knowlton Hall exhibits a sketch wall of over 80 drawings donated from former speakers at the Baumer Lecture Series. This collection can be accessed by the public when the building is open in the Student Services office. The first floor also features the Banvard Gallery, a rotating art and installation collection space utilized by faculty, students, and alum to exhibit work.

== Architecture ==
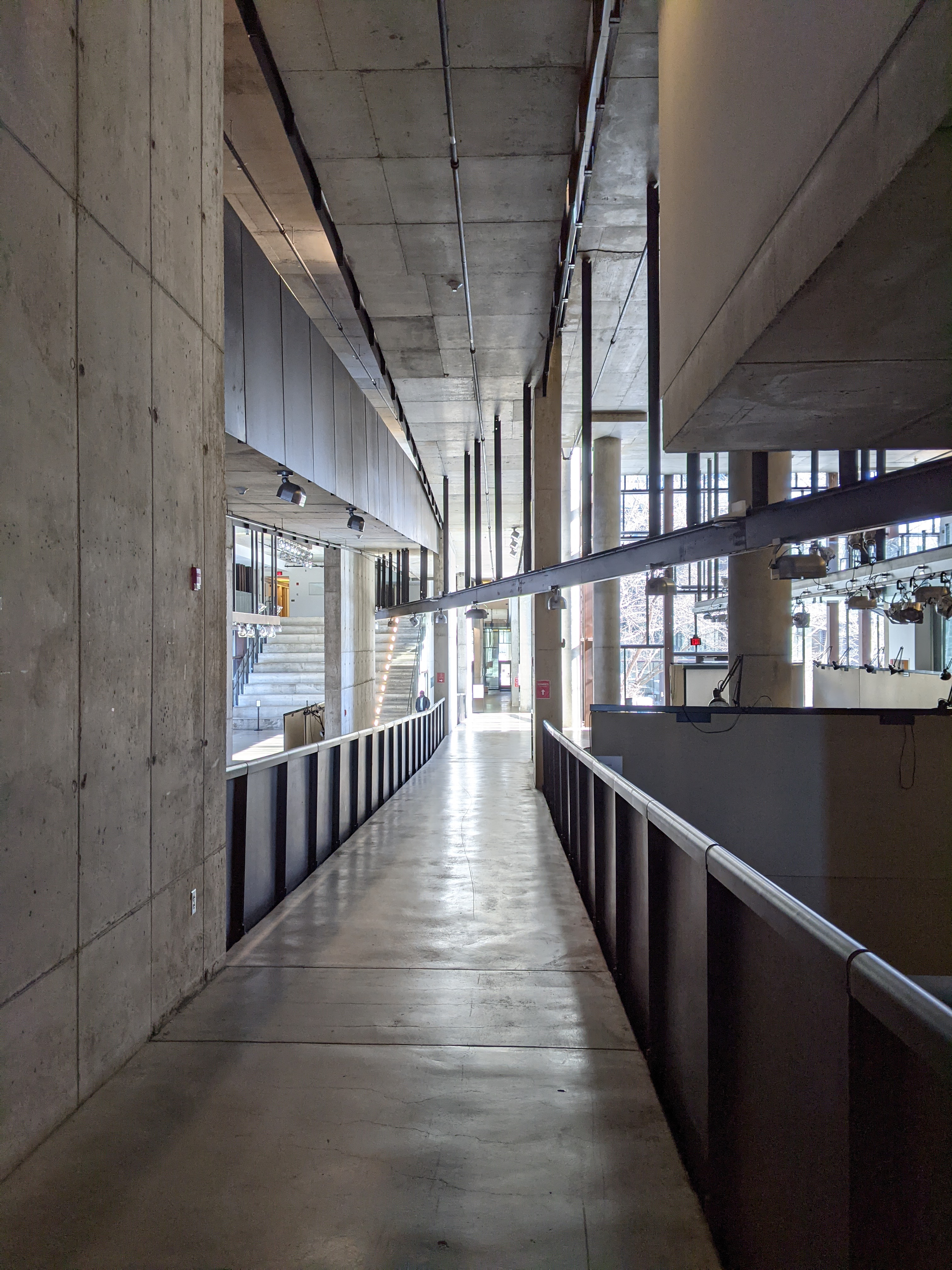
An interior space

Initially, the brief for the building was to renovate the existing building, Ives Hall, and plan an addition to accommodate anticipated programming. As the architect, Mack Scogin Merrill Elam Architects, worked, they realized it would be better to build anew with the primary goal of the building to inspire its students.

The structure is post-tensioned concrete construction and white Georgia marble as stipulated by the donor. The marble was used as shingles in a rainscreen that could be easily replaced and allow light inside.

The resulting building form is monumental with enclosing, defining, and confronting space and adjacent buildings with a sense of elegance reflected in its green space. Designed by Michael Van Valkenburgh Associates, the landscape attempts to increase nature on the site through landform strips around the building's perimeter and construction of an arboreal bosque.

== Design and organization ==
Knowlton Hall houses a 30,000 volume library, 65 offices, 45 studio spaces, a workshop, its own café, and a large auditorium that serves not only as one of the six classrooms in Knowlton but also as a stage for the KSA lecture series. The KSA lecture series bring students into close contact with prominent researchers and practitioners of architecture, landscape architecture, and city planning. As one member of an award jury for the American Institute of Architects (AIA) said in regards to Knowlton Hall:

What architect would not have liked to have gone to school here? This project embodies everything I would want in an architecture building. It is full of unique spaces, an open flexible hall that beckons people to participate, and seems to have surprises around every corner. 'Our buildings shape us,' as Churchill said, and to have future generations of architects learn and grow as designers within an inspiring building such as this ... is exhilarating.

== Recognition ==
Since its completion in 2004, Knowlton Hall has been the subject of a lot of attention, not only within the local community of Columbus but also nationally. Knowlton Hall has gained recognition by national publications, such as Architecture, Competitions, Dwell, Praxis, and Architectural Record, and has also been the recipient of numerous awards:

- American Institute of Architects, National; Architecture Honor Award, 2010
- American Institute of Architects/American Library Association; Award of Excellence, 2005
- American Institute of Architects, Georgia; Honor Award, 2006
- American Institute of Architects, Ohio; Honor Award, 2005
- American Institute of Architects, Columbus; Honor Award, 2009
- American Council of Engineering Companies; National Recognition Award, 2005
- American Council of Engineering Companies, Ohio; Grand Award, 2005
- Post Tensioning Institute; Award of Excellence, 2004
- Columbus Landmarks; James B. Recchie Design Award, Finalist, 2007

== Publications ==
Todd Gannon, Margaret Fletcher, Teresa Ball (eds), Mack Scogin Merrill Elam: Knowlton Hall, Columbus, Ohio, Springer Science & Business Media, 2007
