= Ohio State Route 706 =

State highway in western Ohio, US

State Route 706

Route information
- Maintained by ODOT
- Length: 7.44 mi (11.97 km)
- Existed: 1937–present

Major junctions
- West end: SR 29 in Pasco
- East end: SR 235 near Quincy

Location
- Country: United States
- State: Ohio
- Counties: Shelby, Logan

Highway system
- Ohio State Highway System; Interstate; US; State; Scenic
← SR 705	→ SR 707

State Route 706 (SR 706) is an east–west state route in western Ohio. The western terminus of SR 706 is at SR 29 in the hamlet of Pasco, and its eastern terminus is at a T-intersection with SR 235 just south of Quincy.

== Route description ==
SR 706 starts at its junction with SR 29 in the unincorporated community of Pasco, at the northwest corner of Cedar Point Cemetery. Departing the intersection to the east, SR 706 passes along the north side of the cemetery, meeting Pasco-Montra Road in the process. East of there, the highway passes through Shelby County's Perry Township amidst a rural landscape dominated by farmland, with the occasional house appearing along the way. SR 706 intersects Ferree Road, then continues east for a period, passing Johnston-Slagle Road on its way to a T-intersection with Tawawa-Maplewood Road. There, SR 706 turns north, and follows Tawawa-Maplewood Road for one-half mile (0.80 km), before turning to the east again just south of the hamlet of Pemberton. After a stretch, SR 706 arrives at its intersection with Logan-Shelby Road, which, fittingly, serves as the boundary between Shelby County and Logan County.

Now across the county line, and into Miami Township, SR 706 traverses eastward through more of farm country. Arriving at its intersection with Logan County Road 68, SR 706 turns north briefly, then curves back to the east. A short time later, SR 706 comes to an end as it arrives at a T-intersection with SR 235 less than one-quarter mile (0.40 km) south of Quincy.

== History ==
The SR 706 designation was applied in 1937. The highway followed the same routing then that it does today. The only differences between then and now are the designations of the highways that mark SR 706's endpoints. The western terminus of the highway in 1937 was at SR 54. Today, that highway is now designated as SR 29. As for the eastern terminus of SR 706, it was originally at SR 69. Now, that highway is designated as SR 235.

== Major intersections ==
County	Location	mi	km	Destinations	Notes
Shelby	Perry Township	0.00	0.00	SR 29	
Logan	Miami Township	7.44	11.97	SR 235 – Quincy, New Carlisle	
1.000 mi = 1.609 km; 1.000 km = 0.621 mi
