= Sweetman =

Sweetman is an Irish surname. Notable people with the name include:

- Aaron Pajich-Sweetman (1998–2016), Australian murder victim
- Bill Sweetman (born 1956), American military historian
- Brendan Sweetman (born 1962), Irish philosopher
- Caroline Sweetman (born 1983), Scottish cricketer
- Courtney Sweetman-Kirk (born 1990), English footballer
- Dan Sweetman (born 1985), Australian television presenter
- David Sweetman (1943–2002), British writer and broadcaster
- Edmund Sweetman (1912–1968), Irish Fine Gael politician
- Elinor Sweetman (c1861–1922), Irish poet and author
- Gerard Sweetman (1908–1970), Irish Fine Gael politician and lawyer
- Harvey Sweetman (1921–2015), New Zealand fighter pilot
- John Sweetman (United Irishman) (1752–1826), Irish brewer and United Irishman
- John Sweetman (1844–1936), Irish politician and former leader of Sinn Féin
- Joseph Sweetman Ames (1864–1943), American physicist, professor and provost at Johns Hopkins University
- Kenneth Sweetman (born 1954), American organist
- Mary Sweetman (1859–1930), Irish novelist
- Maude Sweetman (1877–1943), American politician who served in the Washington State House of Representatives
- Maurice Sweetman (d 1427), 14th-century Archdeacon of Armagh
- Milo Sweetman (died 1380), Irish archbishop
- Rebecca Sweetman, Professor of Ancient History and Archaeology, University of St Andrews
- Richard Sweetman (born 1990), Australian speedway racer
- Rod Sweetman (born 1953), Australian politician
- Roger Sweetman (1874–1954), Irish Fine Gael politician and lawyer
- Roger Sweetman (Newfoundland politician) (died 1862), Newfoundland politician
- Rory Sweetman (born 1956), New Zealand historian
- Tom Sweetman (1873–1945), Australian rules footballer
