= Philip Coombs =

Philip Coombs may refer to:

- Philip H. Coombs (1915–2006), American educator
- Philip D. Coombs (1946–2001), Washington State archivist
