= Washington State Digital Archives =

American digital archive

- 47.488°N 117.587°W
- Location: 960 Washington Street, Cheney, Washington, USA
- Type: Archivist
- Established: October 4, 2004

Collection
- Size: 267 million records (92 million available online)

Other information
- Website: digitalarchives.wa.gov

The Washington State Digital Archives in Cheney, Washington preserves electronic records from Washington's state and local government agencies. It opened in October 2004 and is the first state archives in the United States dedicated specifically to the preservation of electronic records.

== History ==
The Washington State Archives began strategic planning for the Digital Archives in 2000, and planning for the physical design and technical infrastructure occurred in 2002. Construction began in January 2003.

Concurrent with construction, research began on the programmatic and technological aspects of the Digital Archives. Site visits by project team members were made to the National Archives and the Library of Congress. A strategic plan was developed that included extensive involvement of staff, executive management and external stakeholders.

In June 2004, custom development on the web interface and database design began, blending the latest technologies with traditional archival theory to create a first of its kind repository. The goal of the program was to make the historical electronic records of State and Local government agencies easily accessible to the public, from anywhere, at any time. The first records brought into the facilities care were marriage records from three pilot counties (Chelan, Snohomish and Spokane) along with the Historic Census and Naturalization records from the State Archives and State Library.

The grand opening of the facility occurred on October 4, 2004 and was attended by Washington State legislators, county officials, and archivists from throughout the United States. Among the speakers at this prestigious event were Washington Secretary of State Sam Reed and Lew Bellardo, Deputy Archivist of the United States.

Some significant milestones have occurred over the years. In 2005 the staff of the digital archives worked quickly to preserve outgoing governor Gary Locke's website, an important public record, before it was replaced by the website for incoming governor Christine Gregoire. Three years later, through a collaboration with Microsoft Research, the archives released a ground-breaking new feature that made it possible to keyword search audio files. As of May 15, 2017, there are nearly 30,000 keyword searchable audio files on the archives website. Starting in 2007, the archives partnered with the Library of Congress on their Multi-State Preservation Consortium, an effort to spread digital archiving of state government records into other states across the country.

The Washington State Digital Archives is part of the Office of the Secretary of State.

== Location ==
The archives is located in Cheney, Washington on the campus of Eastern Washington University. The archives has extensive educational partnerships with the university including internships for students, an archive crash-course for history survey classes, and facilitated student research projects using surrogate archival collections. One student-driven project, "Treasures of the Archives," showcases a compelling series or records in the collection each month. These short bits are featured on the archives' home page.

The archives is located on the southwest corner of EWU's campus in a two-story building that it shares with the Eastern Region Branch of the Washington State Archives, a regional archives for paper records created by local government agencies in Washington's eleven easternmost counties. The building is named for Belle Reeves, the first woman to serve as Secretary of State of Washington.

== Collections ==
As of 2025, the digital archives had preserved 267 million records, of which over 92 million were available for online search.

Featured collections include the A. M. Kendrick Photograph Collection (c. 1890 – c. 1976), House of Representatives Committee Audio Meeting Recordings and the Spokane City Planning Department EXPO'74 Photographic Collection (Expo '74).

== See also ==
- List of Web archiving initiatives
- Philip D. Coombs
