= Bloomfield Township, Ohio =

Bloomfield Township, Ohio may refer to:

- Bloomfield Township, Jackson County, Ohio
- Bloomfield Township, Logan County, Ohio
- Bloomfield Township, Trumbull County, Ohio

== See also ==
- Bloom Township, Ohio (disambiguation)
