= Lake Township, Ohio =

Lake Township, Ohio, may refer to:

- Lake Township, Ashland County, Ohio
- Lake Township, Logan County, Ohio
- Lake Township, Stark County, Ohio
- Lake Township, Wood County, Ohio
