= Pleasant Township, Logan County, Ohio =

Township in Ohio, US

- Township
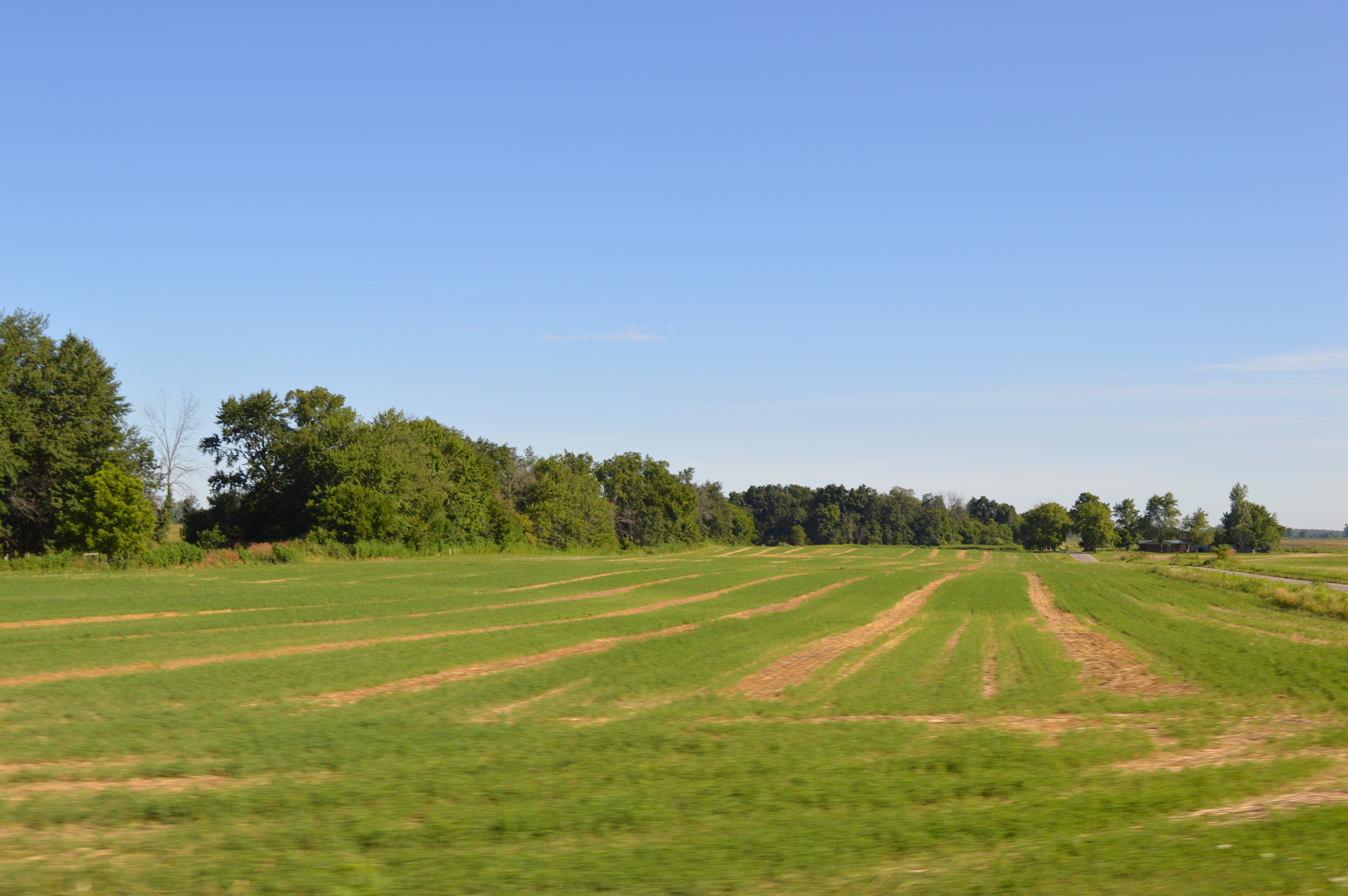
- Fields on State Route 47 east of Logansville

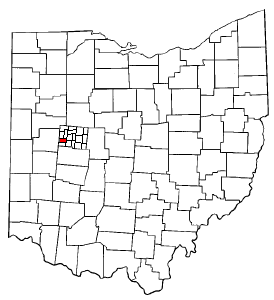
- Location of Pleasant Township in Ohio

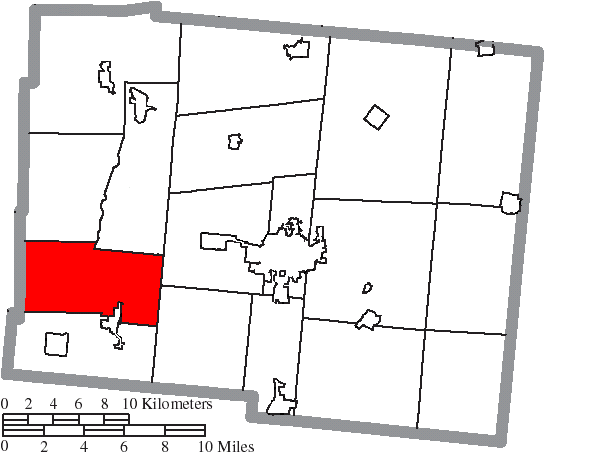
- Location of Pleasant Township in Logan County
- Coordinates: 40°20′27″N 83°55′59″W
- Country: United States
- State: Ohio
- County: Logan

Area
  - Total: 24.2 sq mi (62.7 km^{2})
  - Land: 24.2 sq mi (62.7 km^{2})
  - Water: 0 sq mi (0.0 km^{2})
- Elevation: 1,020 ft (310 m)

Population (2020)
  - Total: 1,144
  - Density: 47.3/sq mi (18.2/km^{2})
- Time zone: UTC-5 (Eastern (EST))
  - Summer (DST): UTC-4 (EDT)
- Area codes: 937, 326
- FIPS code: 39-63324
- GNIS feature ID: 1086491

Pleasant Township is one of the seventeen townships of Logan County, Ohio, United States. As of the 2020 census, the population was 1,144.

== Geography ==
Located in the southwestern part of the county, it borders the following townships:

- Bloomfield Township - north
- Washington Township - northeast
- Harrison Township - east
- Union Township - southeast
- Miami Township - south
- Salem Township, Shelby County - west

Part of the village of DeGraff is located in southern Pleasant Township, and the unincorporated community of Logansville is located in the township's center.

== Name and history ==
Pleasant Township was organized in 1841. It is one of fifteen Pleasant Townships statewide.

== Government ==
The township is governed by a three-member board of trustees, who are elected in November of odd-numbered years to a four-year term beginning on the following January 1. Two are elected in the year after the presidential election and one is elected in the year before it. There is also an elected township fiscal officer, who serves a four-year term beginning on April 1 of the year after the election, which is held in November of the year before the presidential election. Vacancies in the fiscal officership or on the board of trustees are filled by the remaining trustees.

== Transportation ==
Important highways in Pleasant Township are State Routes 47 and 235.
