= Union Township, Ohio =

Union Township, Ohio may refer to:

- Union Township, Auglaize County, Ohio
- Union Township, Belmont County, Ohio
- Union Township, Brown County, Ohio
- Union Township, Carroll County, Ohio
- Union Township, Champaign County, Ohio
- Union Township, Clermont County, Ohio
- Union Township, Clinton County, Ohio
- Union Township, Fayette County, Ohio
- Union Township, Hancock County, Ohio
- Union Township, Highland County, Ohio
- Union Township, Knox County, Ohio
- Union Township, Lawrence County, Ohio
- Union Township, Licking County, Ohio
- Union Township, Logan County, Ohio
- Union Township, Madison County, Ohio
- Union Township, Mercer County, Ohio
- Union Township, Miami County, Ohio
- Union Township, Morgan County, Ohio
- Union Township, Muskingum County, Ohio
- Union Township, Pike County, Ohio
- Union Township, Putnam County, Ohio
- Union Township, Ross County, Ohio
- Union Township, Scioto County, Ohio
- Union Township, Tuscarawas County, Ohio
- Union Township, Union County, Ohio
- Union Township, Van Wert County, Ohio
- Union Township, Warren County, Ohio
- West Chester Township, Butler County, Ohio, which was named Union Township until 2000

== See also ==
- Union Township, Ohio (disambiguation)
