= Logansville, Ohio =

- Unincorporated community
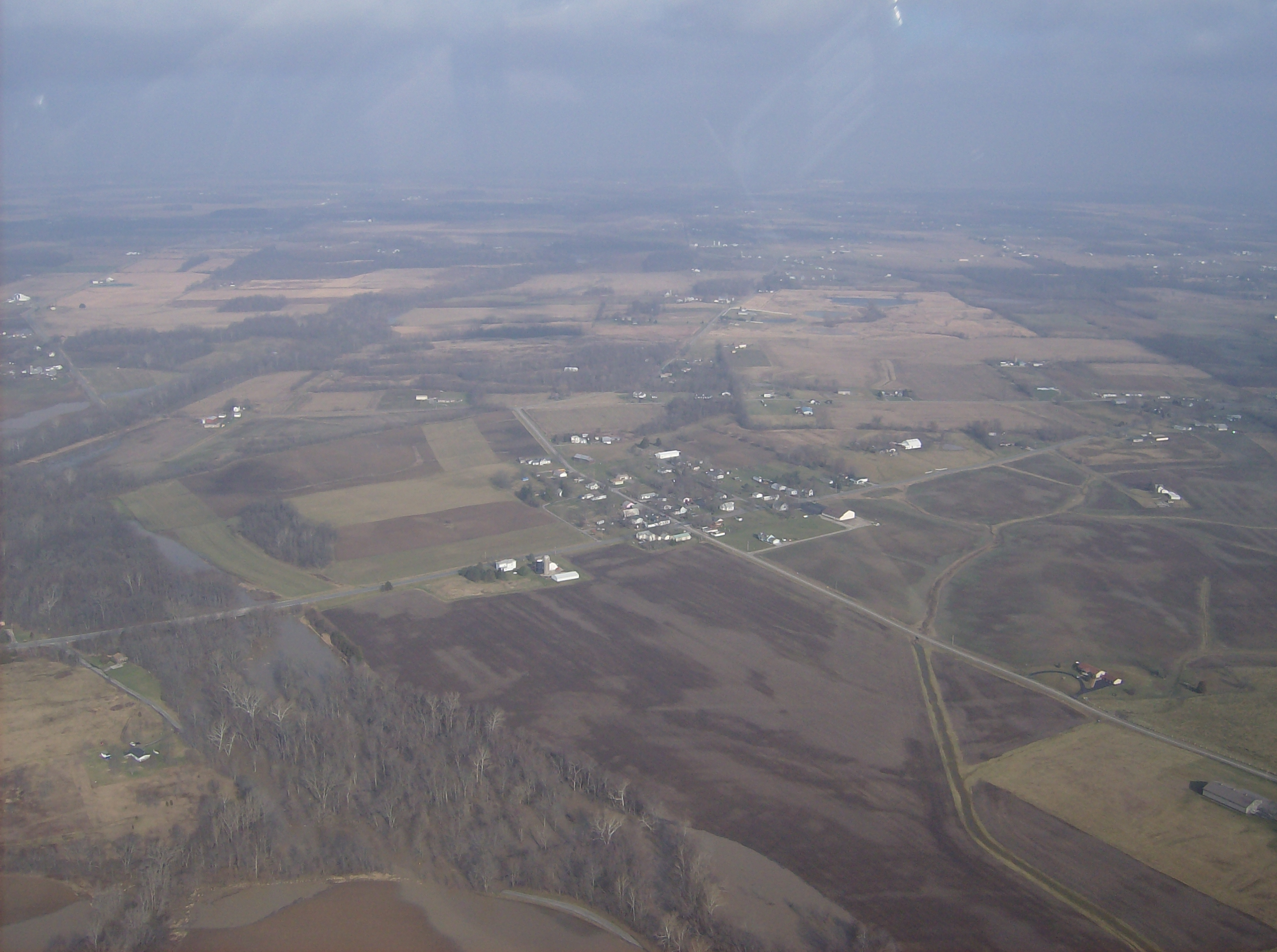
- Aerial view of Logansville from the south

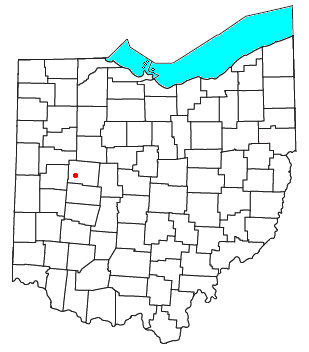
- Location of Logansville, Ohio
- Coordinates: 40°20′44″N 83°55′50″W
- Country: United States
- State: Ohio
- County: Logan
- Township: Pleasant
- Elevation: 1,007 ft (307 m)
- Time zone: UTC-5 (Eastern (EST))
  - Summer (DST): UTC-4 (EDT)
- GNIS feature ID: 1061437

Logansville (also Loganville) is an unincorporated community in central Pleasant Township, Logan County, Ohio, United States. It lies along State Route 47 at its intersection with County Road 24. The Great Miami River flows southward along the western edge of Logansville. The community lies 2 1/2 miles (4 km) north of the village of De Graff and 9 miles (14 1/2 km) west of the city of Bellefontaine, the county seat of Logan County.

Logansville was platted in 1827, and named after Logan, an Indian tribal leader. A post office called Logansville was established in 1835, and remained in operation until 1905.

Logansville is served by the Logansville Community Church.
