= Harrison Township, Logan County, Ohio =

Township in Ohio, US

- Township
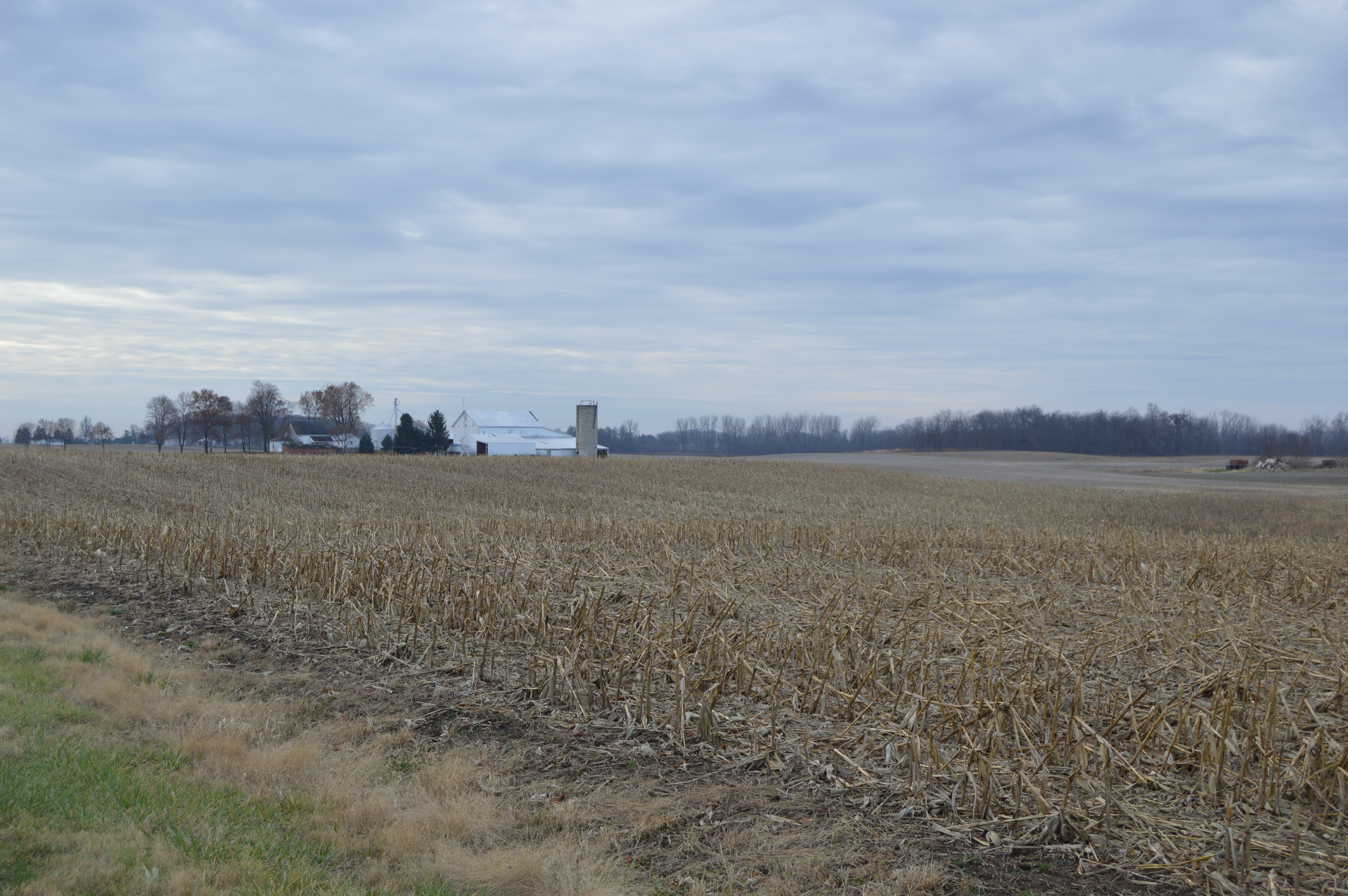
- Fields west of Bellefontaine

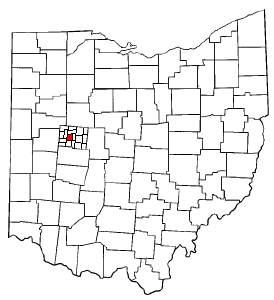
- Location of Harrison Township in Ohio

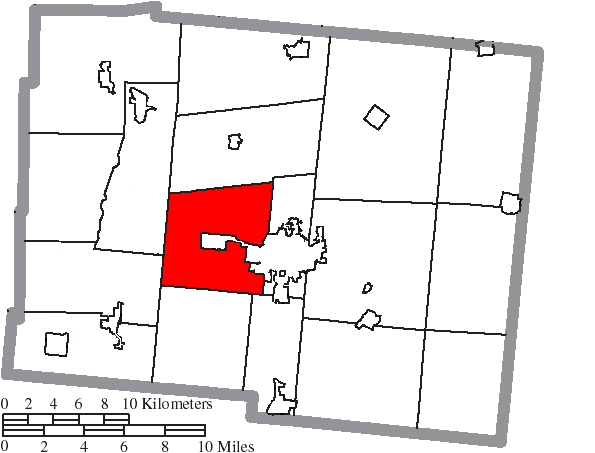
- Location of Harrison Township in Logan County
- Coordinates: 40°22′27″N 83°48′19″W
- Country: United States
- State: Ohio
- County: Logan

Area
  - Total: 25.8 sq mi (66.7 km^{2})
  - Land: 25.7 sq mi (66.5 km^{2})
  - Water: 0.077 sq mi (0.2 km^{2})
- Elevation: 1,158 ft (353 m)

Population (2020)
  - Total: 2,061
  - Density: 80.3/sq mi (31.0/km^{2})
- Time zone: UTC-5 (Eastern (EST))
  - Summer (DST): UTC-4 (EDT)
- Area codes: 937, 326
- FIPS code: 39-33908
- GNIS feature ID: 1086483

Harrison Township is one of the seventeen townships of Logan County, Ohio, United States. As of the 2020 census, the population was 2,061.

== Geography ==
Located in the western part of the county, it borders the following townships:

- McArthur Township - north
- Lake Township - east
- Liberty Township - southeast
- Union Township - south
- Pleasant Township - southwest
- Washington Township - west

Part of the city of Bellefontaine, the county seat of Logan County, is located in eastern and central Harrison Township.

== Name and history ==
Harrison Township was organized in 1836. It is one of nineteen Harrison Townships statewide.

== Government ==
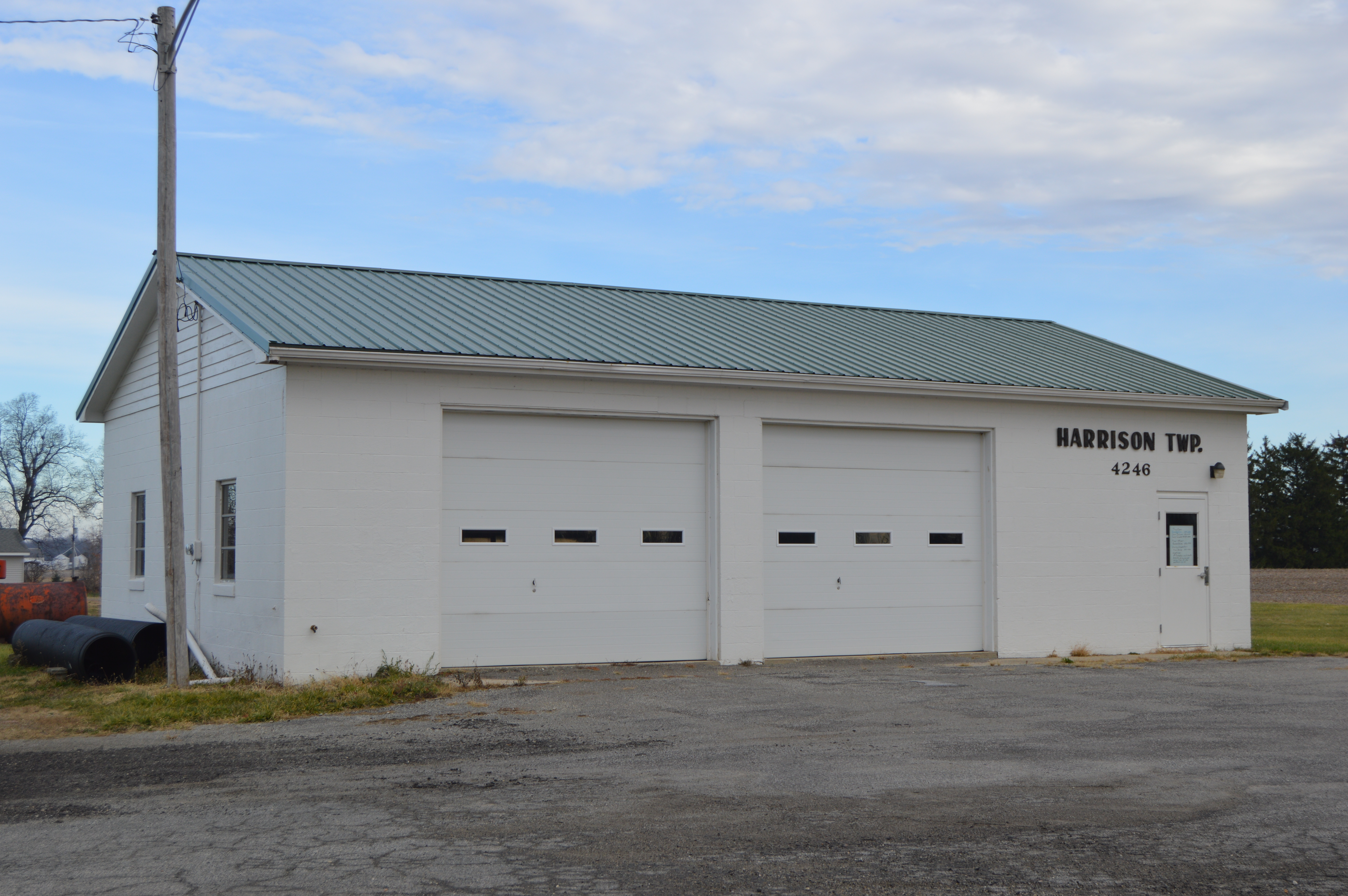
Township hall

The township is governed by a three-member board of trustees, who are elected in November of odd-numbered years to a four-year term beginning on the following January 1. Two are elected in the year after the presidential election and one is elected in the year before it. There is also an elected township fiscal officer, who serves a four-year term beginning on April 1 of the year after the election, which is held in November of the year before the presidential election. Vacancies in the fiscal officership or on the board of trustees are filled by the remaining trustees.

== Transportation ==
U.S. Route 33 and State Route 47 are the major highways in Harrison Township. As well, Bellefontaine Regional Airport is located in the township's center.
