= Miami Township, Logan County, Ohio =

Township in Ohio, US

- Township
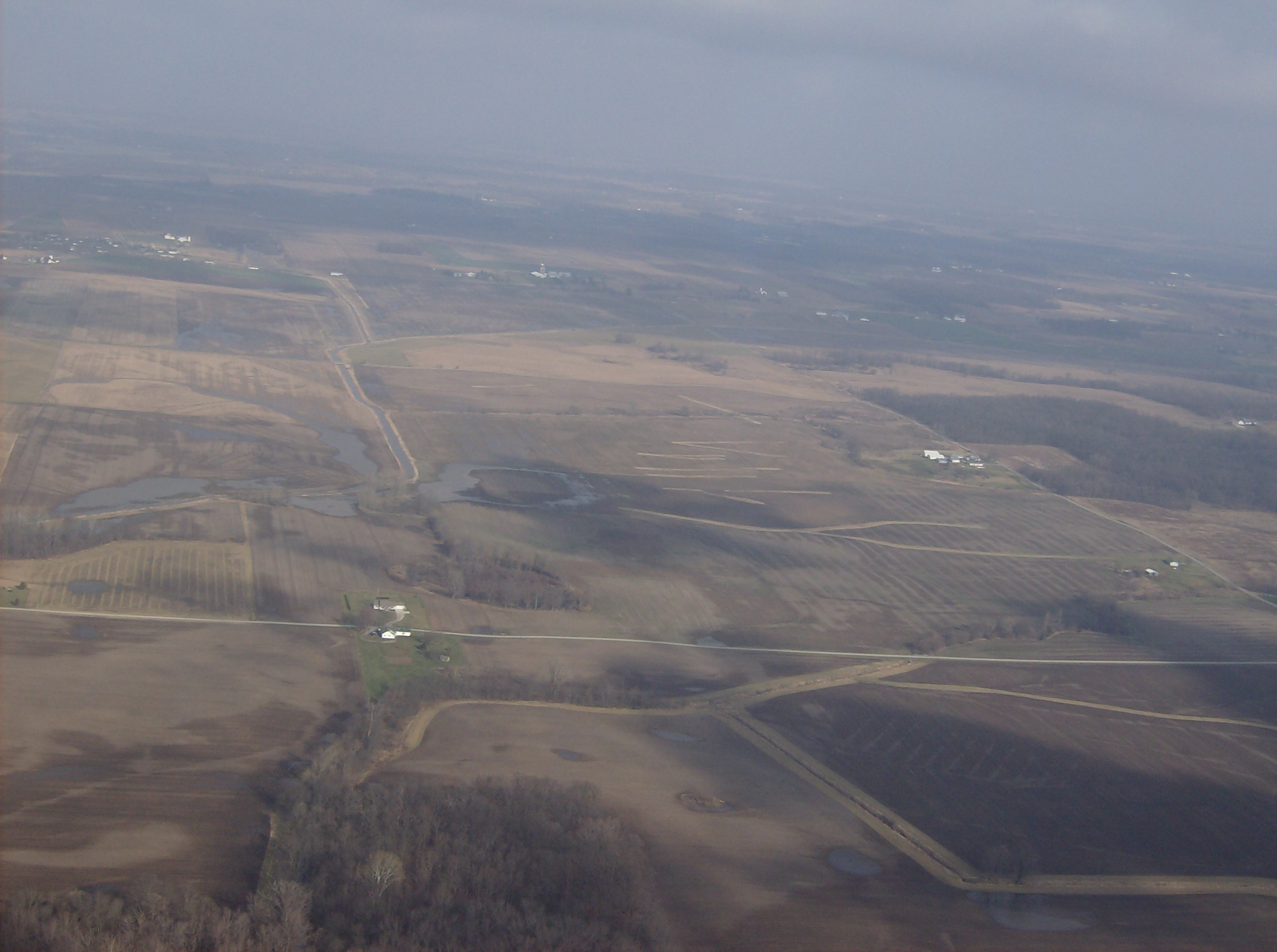
- Fields in eastern Miami Township

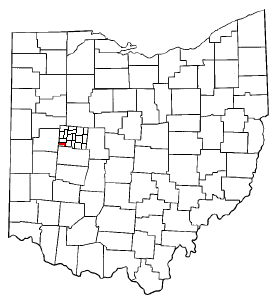
- Location of Miami Township in Ohio

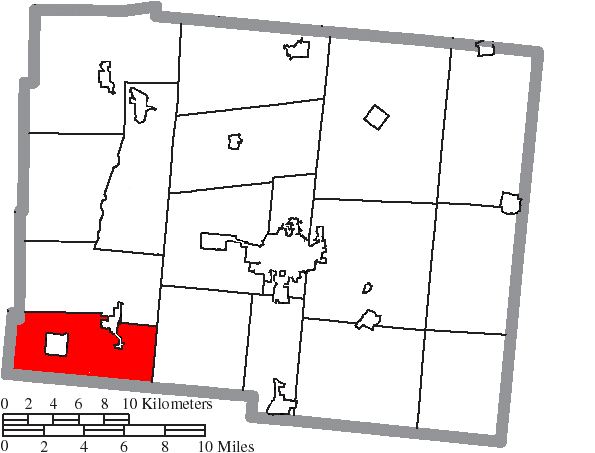
- Location of Miami Township in Logan County
- Coordinates: 40°17′58″N 83°56′4″W
- Country: United States
- State: Ohio
- County: Logan

Area
  - Total: 23.12 sq mi (59.87 km^{2})
  - Land: 23.07 sq mi (59.74 km^{2})
  - Water: 0.046 sq mi (0.12 km^{2})
- Elevation: 1,017 ft (310 m)

Population (2020)
  - Total: 2,110
  - Density: 91.5/sq mi (35.3/km^{2})
- Time zone: UTC-5 (Eastern (EST))
  - Summer (DST): UTC-4 (EDT)
- Area codes: 937, 326
- FIPS code: 39-49378
- GNIS feature ID: 1086488

Miami Township is one of the seventeen townships of Logan County, Ohio, United States. As of the 2020 census, the population was 2,110.

== Geography ==
Located in the southwestern corner of the county, it borders the following townships:

- Pleasant Township - north
- Union Township - east
- Harrison Township, Champaign County - southeast
- Adams Township, Champaign County - south
- Perry Township, Shelby County - west
- Salem Township, Shelby County - northwest

Two villages are located in Miami Township: Quincy in the west and part of DeGraff in the northeast.

== Name and history ==
Miami Township was organized in 1818. It is named after the Great Miami River, which flows through the township. Statewide, other Miami Townships are found in Clermont, Greene, Hamilton, and Montgomery counties.

== Government ==
The township is governed by a three-member board of trustees, who are elected in November of odd-numbered years to a four-year term beginning on the following January 1. Two are elected in the year after the presidential election and one is elected in the year before it. There is also an elected township fiscal officer, who serves a four-year term beginning on April 1 of the year after the election, which is held in November of the year before the presidential election. Vacancies in the fiscal officership or on the board of trustees are filled by the remaining trustees.

== Transportation ==
Important highways in Miami Township include State Routes 235, 508, and 706.
