= Belle Reeves =

8th Secretary of State of Washington

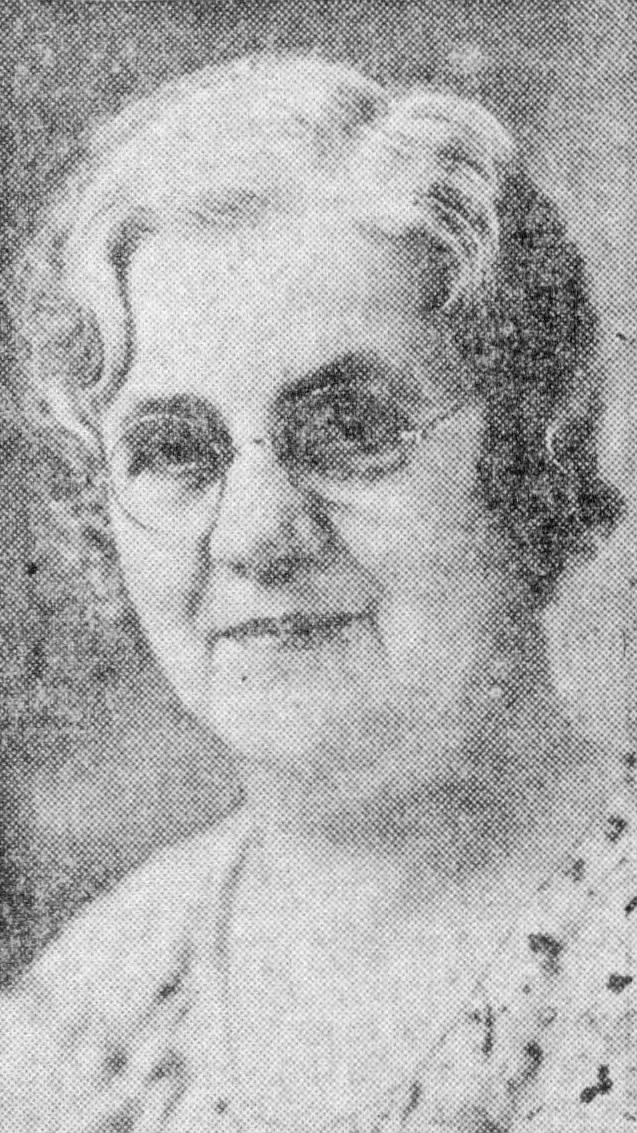

8th Secretary of State of Washington
- In office February 7, 1938 – January 2, 1948
- Governor: Clarence D. Martin; Arthur B. Langlie; Monrad Wallgren
- Preceded by: Ernest Hutchinson
- Succeeded by: Earl Coe

Member of the Washington House of Representatives from the 12th district
- In office January 9, 1933 – 1938 Serving with Ivan J. Compton (1933–1935); Robert Murray (1935–1937); Noble L. "Dude" Brown (1937–1938)
- Preceded by: Earl W. Benson
- Succeeded by: John Isenhart; D. W. Jones

Member of the Washington House of Representatives from the 56th district
- In office January 12, 1931 – January 9, 1933
- Preceded by: E. M. Gillette
- Succeeded by: None (district dissolved)
- In office January 8, 1923 – January 10, 1927
- Preceded by: E. M. Gillette
- Succeeded by: Hubert Remley

Personal details
- Born: Anna Belle Culp; August 17, 1870 Quincy, Ohio, US
- Died: January 2, 1948 (aged 77) Olympia, Washington, US
- Party: Democratic
- Spouse: Frank Reeves
- Education: Normal School, Lyons, Kansas; University of Washington School of Law
- Occupation: Orchardist; printer's apprentice; reporter; stenographer; teacher; typesetter

Belle Reeves (August 17, 1870 – January 2, 1948) was an American Democratic politician from Washington. After first winning election as a write-in candidate in 1922, she served as a member of the Washington House of Representatives representing Chelan County from 1923 to 1927 and 1931 to 1938. She became the first female Washington Secretary of State in 1938 upon her appointment by Governor Clarence D. Martin (and just the second woman to hold statewide elective office in Washington, after Josephine Preston). She served as Secretary of State for ten years through successful elections in 1940 and 1944, dying while in office in 1948. She was also the first woman featured at a national convention of either major party.

== Early life and education ==
Reeves was born Anna Belle Culp on August 17, 1870 near Quincy, Ohio. At 17, she moved with her family to Geneseo, Kansas and attended Normal School in Lyons. There, she met local newspaper publisher Frank Reeves; they married in 1888.

In 1889, the couple moved to Spokane and lost a baby in childbirth. Seeking opportunity in the gold and silver mines outside Coeur d'Alene, they moved to Idaho, but found little success and in 1890 lost another baby. They taught for a year in Post Falls, Idaho, until they had saved enough to move to Ellensburg, Washington. There, they founded Ellensburg's first newspaper, with Belle working as a printer's devil and hand-setting all the type.

1891 saw the birth of their first surviving child, daughter Zelma, as well as their move to Wenatchee, Washington. There, they again founded the town's first newspaper, The Advance. They sold it in 1893, moved to Leavenworth, Washington, and for the third town in a row, founded the first newspaper, The Leavenworth Times.

However, the Times was not profitable, and alongside setting the type, Belle took other work as the local correspondent for the Spokane Spokesman and the Seattle Post-Intelligencer. She was also elected court reporter and legal recorder for several districts, taught shorthand, and recorded candidate speeches in the 1896 United States presidential election, including those of the unsuccessful candidate William Jennings Bryan, a politician she greatly admired.

In 1900, Belle and Frank returned to Wenatchee. Frank and his brother Fred went into law practice together, while Belle left work to raise Zelma and began volunteering with numerous organizations, including the Woman's Christian Temperance Union. Belle helped Frank study law and establish his practice, eventually going on to receive her own law degree from the University of Washington. Meanwhile, Frank went on to serve in the legislature in 1915, and later became a judge.

== Political career ==
Through her political career, she earned a reputation among voters and colleagues as a fair, reliable, and dedicated public servant, as well as the nicknames "The Sweetheart of Washington" and "The Grand Old Lady".

=== Washington State Legislature ===
In 1922, after husband Frank had retired and with their daughter Zelma grown, Reeves won the House of Representatives seat in Washington's 56th legislative district (later dissolved in 1933) that Frank had previously held. Her candidacy resulted from her wide community involvement in Wenatchee: she won her primary by 100 votes when a group of Wenatchee women chose her as their write-in candidate without her prior knowledge or consent.

She was also one of only five women in the entire Legislature when first elected, and served several terms as the only female legislator.

In her first term, the House had only nine Democrats out of 97 seats, which decreased to just five in her second term. In 1924, the Democrats asked her to present the party's memorial at the funeral of former United States President Woodrow Wilson.

However, her party returned to relevance with the nationwide Democratic landslide in 1932, which in Washington swept in Democratic legislative majorities and Governor Clarence D. Martin. After so many years in a tiny minority, the 1932 election made Reeves into one of the most experienced members of the new Democratic majority.

Her legislative priorities included conditions for women, agriculture, education, and social issues such as child welfare.

In 1925, Reeves and Mabel Ingersoll Miller (R-Snohomish County) successfully sponsored House Bill 131 through the legislature, which would have created a separate state prison for women. However, Governor Roland H. Hartley vetoed it, writing that if the bill "is to provide an institution in which the state is to undertake the moral and physical regeneration of hapless and fallen women, the effort is futile and the undertaking doomed to failure before it is begun. Morality cannot be legislated, nor is there any escape from the truth of the saying, 'Protect a fool against his follies and you populate the world with fools.'"

Governor Hartley's statement and attitude toward women galvanized Reeves to work to bring more women into legislative office; recipients of her help in the following years included Maude Sweetman, Pearl Wanamaker, Mary Farquharson, and Kathryn Mallstrom.

In 1933, tragedy struck as Belle led a floor fight against an effort to support federal repeal of the Eighteenth Amendment (prohibition). Her husband Frank stood at the rear of the House chamber cheering, when he suddenly collapsed and was pronounced dead on the scene by a doctor serving in the Senate. He died of a cerebral hemorrhage related to injuries he sustained in a car accident the previous August in which he sustained multiple fractures, including to his skull. Still, Belle held onto the seat for five more years, even while taking over management of their 100-acre fruit orchard.

=== Washington Secretary of State ===
In February, 1938, Washington Secretary of State Ernest Hutchinson died suddenly, and Governor Martin appointed Reeves to fill the position.

At times when both the governor and lieutenant governor were out of state, Reeves served as acting governor, the first woman to do so in Washington. For example, in April 1938, she was described as "acting governor" when she tossed out the first ball of the Olympia Senators' spring season. In July 1939 she was again acting governor at the dedication of a new road at Soap Lake.

As she finished out her appointed term in 1940, she ran for election and won with the second-highest vote total of any candidate on the ballot, behind on President Franklin D. Roosevelt. She won again in 1944, this time with the most votes ever received by any candidate in the state up to that time.

While in office, she served on the Washington State Parks and Recreation Commission and the Washington Commission on Interstate Cooperation.

With her health failing in 1947, she announced that she would not run for reelection, but would stay in office "as long as I can wiggle one little finger".

== Death and legacy ==
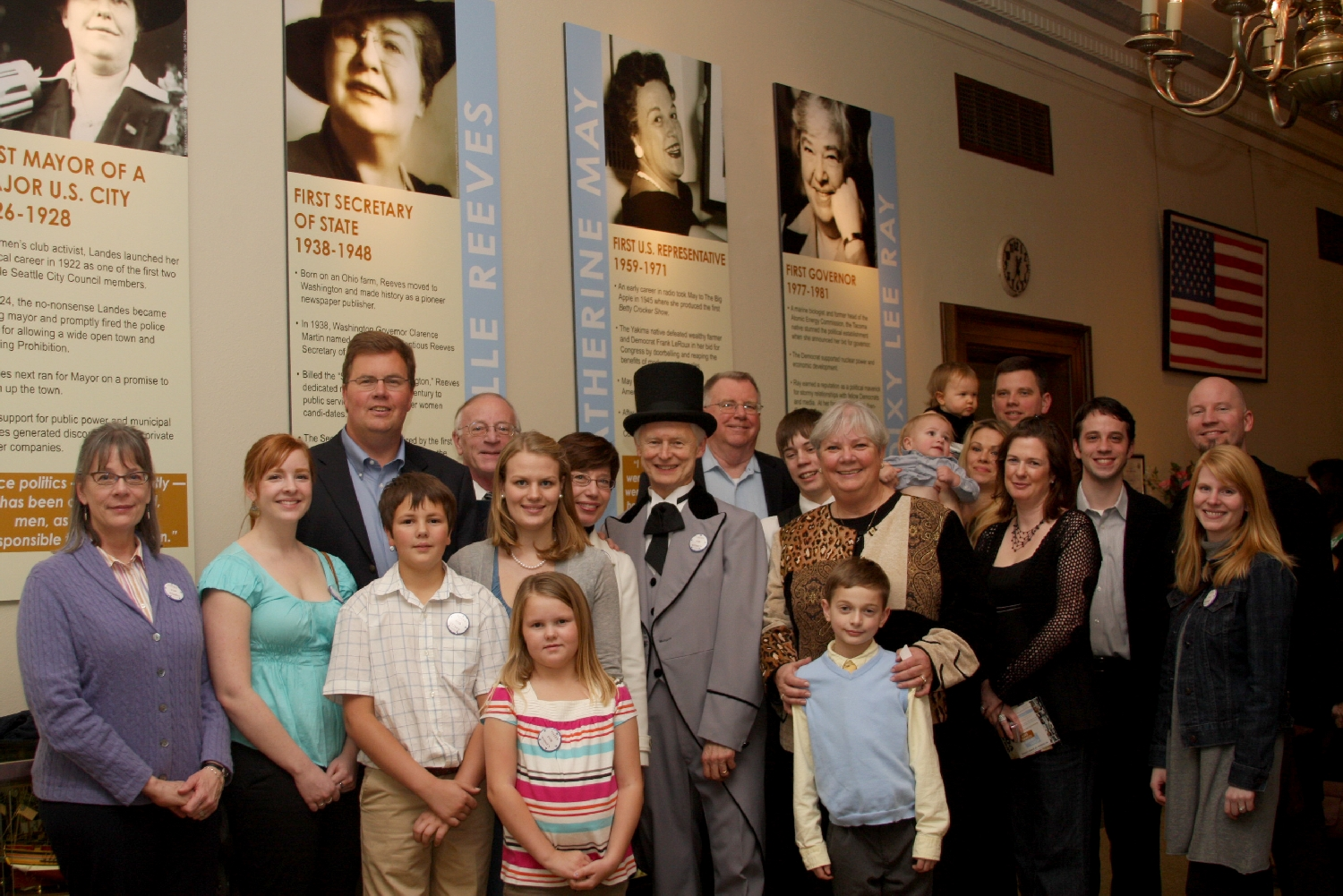
Relatives of Belle Reeves and Secretary Sam Reed under Reeves's display at the Washington's First Women in Government reception.

Reeves died in Olympia, Washington on January 2, 1948. She received the only state funeral ever held in the House Chamber of the Washington State Legislature. Governor Monrad Wallgren recalled her as "one of the most highly respected public officials ever to hold office in this state." While women went on to hold other Washington statewide offices, it would be 75 years until Kim Wyman became the next woman to serve as Secretary of State.

The Washington State Archives Building on the campus of Eastern Washington University in Cheney, Washington is named for Reeves. Opened in 2004, it houses the Eastern Washington Regional Archives and the Washington State Digital Archives.

== See also ==
- Secretary of State of Washington
