= Milo Sweetman =

Archbishop of Armagh (14th century)

- Archbishop of Armagh
- Church: Catholic Church (Archbishop)
- Archdiocese: Armagh
- See: Armagh
- Appointed: 1361 (by Pope Innocent VI)
- Term ended: 1380 (death)
- Other post: Treasurer of the Diocese of Ossory (by 1360)
- Previous post: Bishop-elect of Ossory (1360; election cancelled)

Personal details
- Died: 1380
- Buried: Dromiskin, Co. Louth

Milo Sweetman (died 1380) was a fourteenth-century Irish Archbishop of Armagh, who was noted for his fierce defence of the privileges of his archdiocese.

== Biography ==
Sweetman was treasurer of the Diocese of Ossory by 1360, and in that year he was elected Bishop of Ossory by the Cathedral Chapter. His election was cancelled by Pope Innocent VI in favour of John de Tatenhale, who had already been promised the see. However in the following year as a "consolation prize" Innocent appointed him to the vacant office of Archbishop of Armagh. He was summoned to England attend to meet the King in the same year, but pleaded to be excused attendance.

Sweetman revived the old controversy as to whether the Archbishop of Armagh had primacy over the Archbishop of Dublin, a claim which successive Archbishops of Dublin had always denied. He and Thomas Minot, Archbishop of Dublin from 1363 to 1375, maintained the dispute with such vehemence that King Edward III intervened personally in 1365, urging the two men to live in friendship and proposing that they settle the matter as a similar controversy between the Archbishop of Canterbury and the Archbishop of York had been resolved i.e. by each bearing his crozier in the other's presence. Sweetman replied at length insisting on the claim of Armagh to primacy and pointing out that Minot had failed to attend a meeting which had been convened to discuss the matter. This letter clearly had an effect, since Minot was summoned before the Privy Council of Ireland to answer a charge of contempt of Parliament in failing to attend the meeting. Having thus asserted his authority, Sweetman was content to let the matter lapse, and no further action was taken against Minot. The controversy remained dormant for some decades, but flared up again in the fifteenth century.

Sweetman was present at the Irish Parliament of 1367 which passed the Statutes of Kilkenny. In 1374 he defeated an attempt by the Lord Deputy of Ireland, Sir William de Windsor, to dispense with the Irish Parliament by ordering the clergy and laity of the Pale to attend the English Parliament. Sweetman argued that they had no such obligation, and that while out of deference to the King, they would answer the summons they would not vote any taxes. Since this deprived the exercise of any point, it was not repeated.

Having governed the Primatial See for nineteen years he died in 1380, and is buried in Dromiskin, Co. Louth. He is one of the first recorded Sweetmans in Irish history: Maurice Sweetman, Archdeacon of Armagh, is likely to have been a nephew or cousin of Milo. Richard Sweetman was Abbot of the Abbey of St Thomas the Martyr, in the city of Dublin, in 1306.
