= Salem Township, Shelby County, Ohio =

Township in Ohio, US

- Township
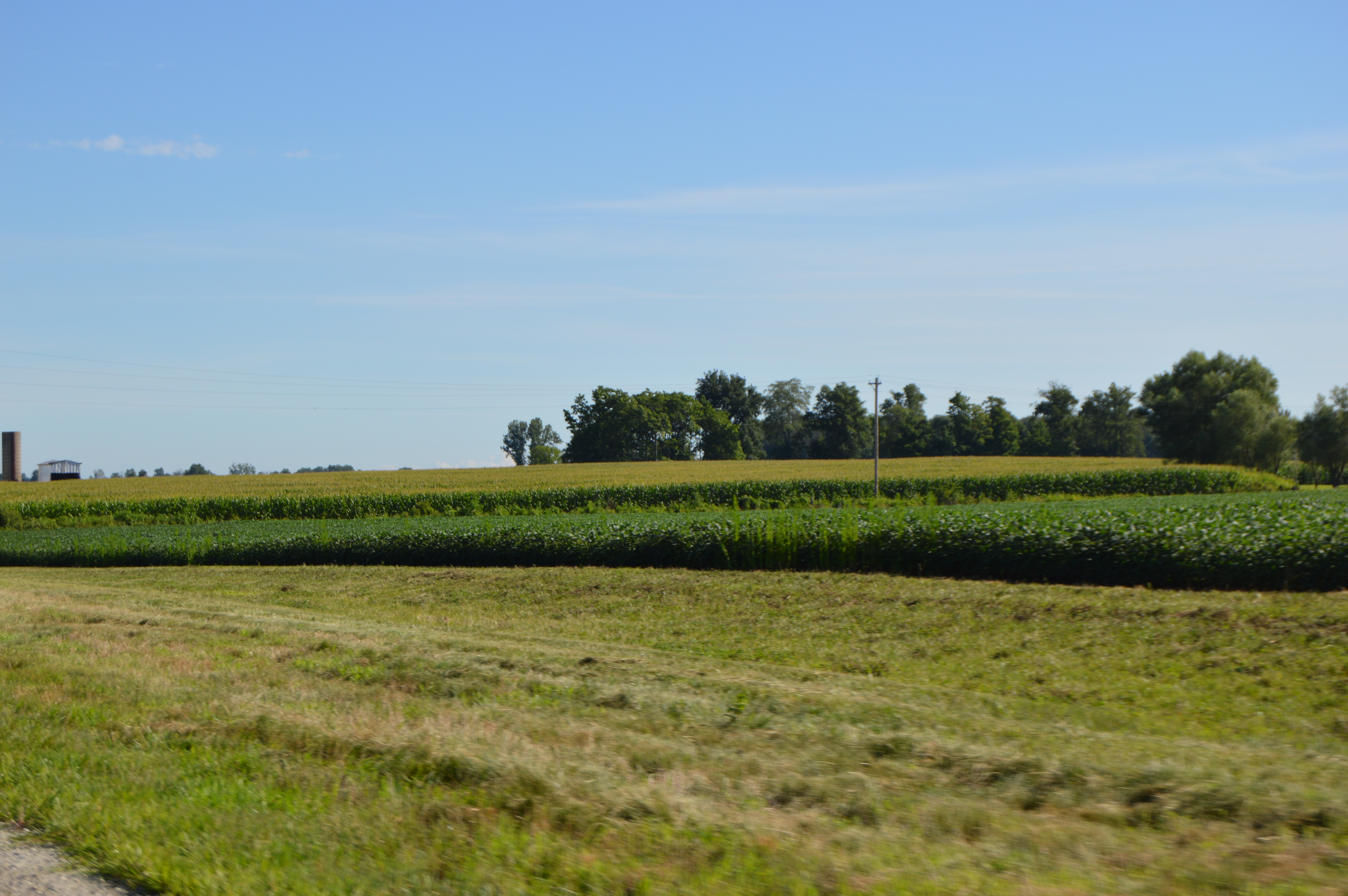
- Farm fields east of Port Jefferson

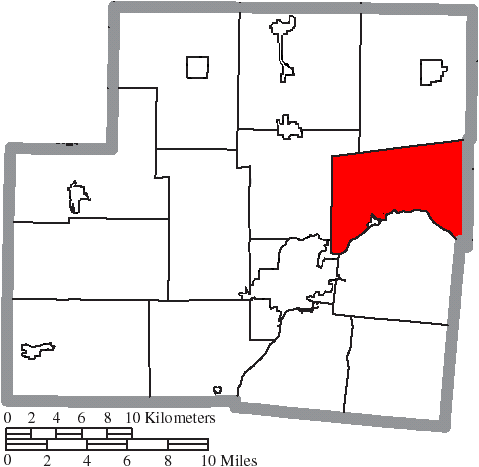
- Location of Salem Township in Shelby County
- Coordinates: 40°20′25″N 84°4′24″W
- Country: United States
- State: Ohio
- County: Shelby

Area
  - Total: 26.7 sq mi (69.2 km^{2})
  - Land: 26.7 sq mi (69.1 km^{2})
  - Water: 0 sq mi (0.0 km^{2})
- Elevation: 1,050 ft (320 m)

Population (2020)
  - Total: 2,076
  - Density: 78/sq mi (30/km^{2})
- Time zone: UTC-5 (Eastern (EST))
  - Summer (DST): UTC-4 (EDT)
- FIPS code: 39-69960
- GNIS feature ID: 1086968

Salem Township is one of the fourteen townships of Shelby County, Ohio, United States. The 2020 census found 2,076 people in the township.

== Geography ==
Located in the eastern part of the county, it borders the following townships:

- Jackson Township - north
- Bloomfield Township, Logan County - northeast
- Pleasant Township, Logan County - east
- Miami Township, Logan County - southeast
- Perry Township - south
- Clinton Township - southwest
- Franklin Township - northwest

The village of Port Jefferson is located in southern Salem Township, and the unincorporated community of Maplewood lies in the northern part of the township.

== Name and history ==
Salem Township was established in 1826. It is one of fourteen Salem Townships statewide.

== Government ==
The township is governed by a three-member board of trustees, who are elected in November of odd-numbered years to a four-year term beginning on the following January 1. Two are elected in the year after the presidential election and one is elected in the year before it. There is also an elected township fiscal officer, who serves a four-year term beginning on April 1 of the year after the election, which is held in November of the year before the presidential election. Vacancies in the fiscal officership or on the board of trustees are filled by the remaining trustees.
