= Bloom Center, Logan County, Ohio =

Unincorporated community in Ohio, U.S.

Coordinates: 40°25′02″N 83°56′44″W

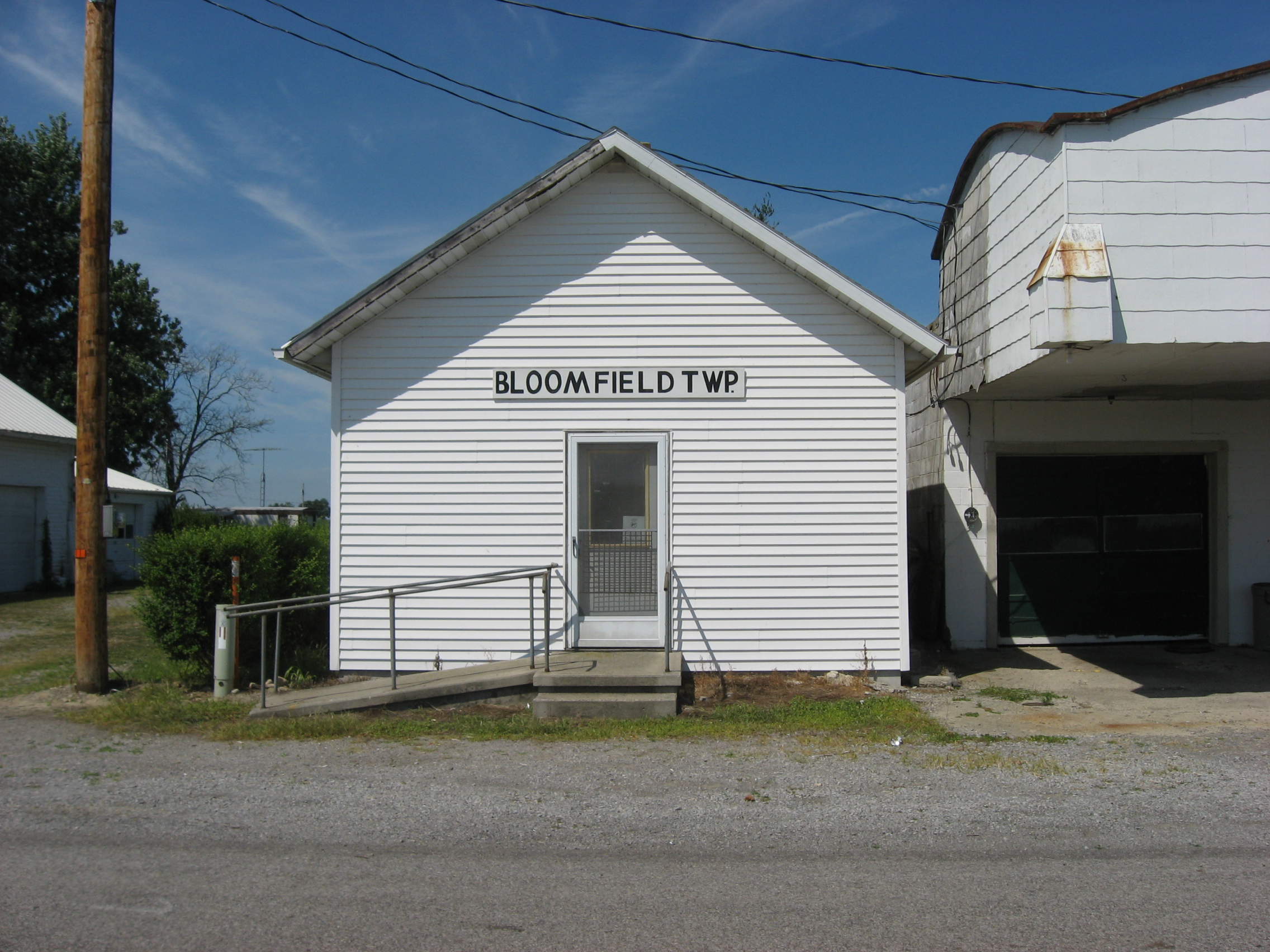
Bloomfield Township hall

Bloom Center is an unincorporated community in Logan County, in the U.S. state of Ohio.

== History ==
Bloom Center was platted in 1852. A post office was established at Bloom Center in 1852, and remained in operation until 1905.
