= Maude Sweetman =

Washington State politician

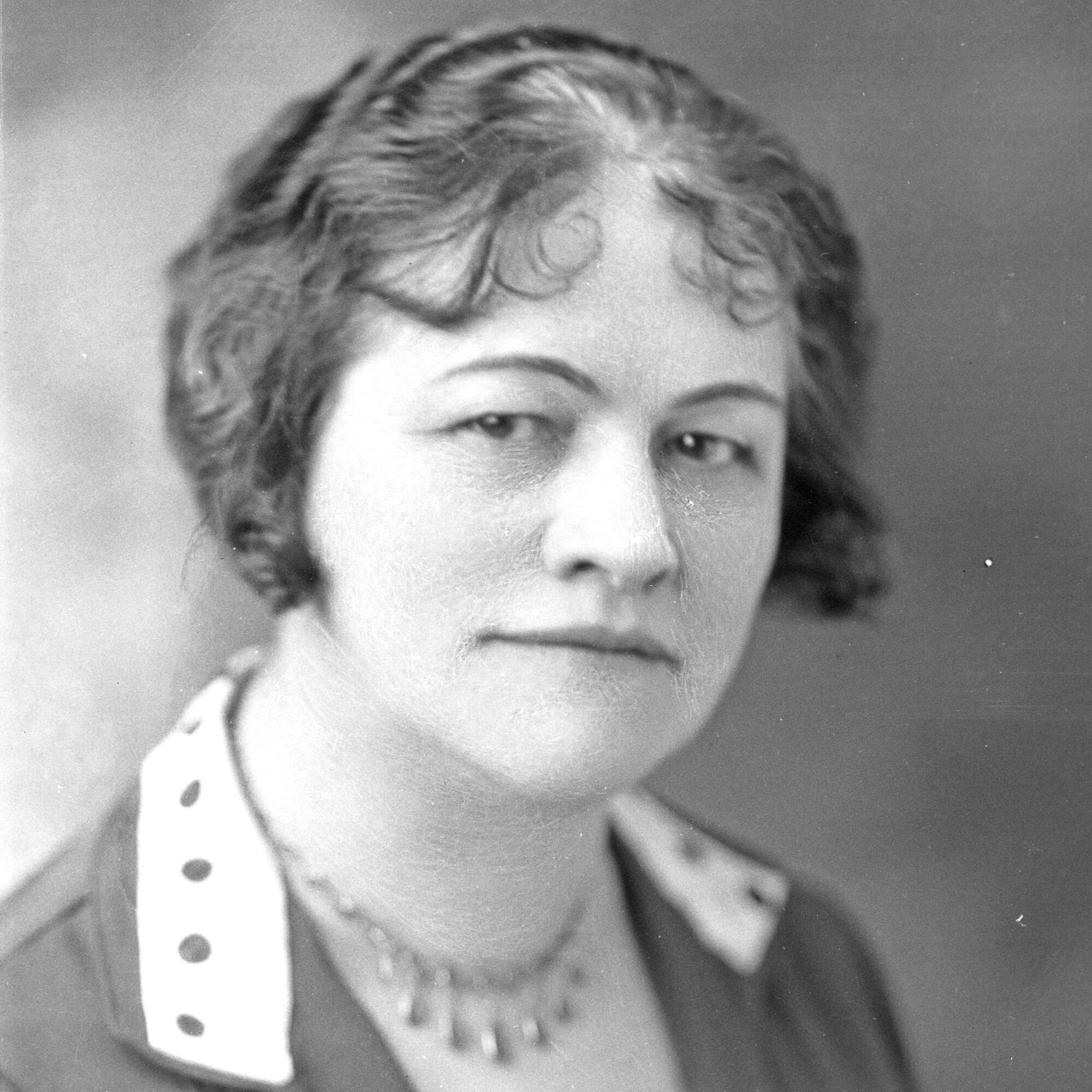
- Sweetman in 1929

Member of the Washington House of Representatives from the 44th district
- In office January 8, 1923 – January 12, 1931 Serving with George F. Meacham (1923–1927); Theodore N. Haller (1927–1929); Raymond C. Hazen (1929–1931)
- Preceded by: George F. Meacham; Frank H. Manogue
- Succeeded by: Victor M. Iverson; William J. Croskill

Personal details
- Born: October 31, 1877 Michigan, U.S.
- Died: June 19, 1943 (aged 65) San Francisco, California, U.S.
- Party: Republican
- Occupation: City employee; business manager

Maude Sweetman (October 31, 1877 – June 19, 1943) was an American politician who served as a member of the Washington House of Representatives from 1923 to 1931. She represented Washington's 44th legislative district as a Republican, and was the first woman from King County elected to the legislature.

She was the primary sponsor in 1929 of a bill to enact corporate and individual income taxes, which passed both houses of the legislature and would have gone to the voters had it not been ruled unconstitutional by the Washington Supreme Court. She served on numerous committees in the legislature, including as chair of the State Charitable Institutions Committee in the 1929 to 1931 term. She was one of a number of important women legislators who received political assistance from Belle Reeves, a fellow legislator and later Washington's first female Secretary of State.

In 1927, after three terms in the legislature, she published her book What Price Politics: the Inside Story of Washington State Politics.

She was married and had three sons.
