= Bloom Township, Ohio =

Bloom Township, Ohio may refer to:

- Bloom Township, Fairfield County, Ohio
- Bloom Township, Morgan County, Ohio
- Bloom Township, Scioto County, Ohio
- Bloom Township, Seneca County, Ohio
- Bloom Township, Wood County, Ohio

== See also ==
- Bloomfield Township, Ohio (disambiguation)
