= Frank Reeves =

American politician (d. 1933)

Member of the Washington House of Representatives from the 56th district
- In office January 11, 1915 – January 8, 1917

Personal details
- Died: January 26, 1933 Olympia, Washington, U.S.
- Party: Democratic
- Spouse: Belle Reeves

Frank Reeves (died January 26, 1933) was an American newspaper publisher and Democratic politician from Washington. He is perhaps best remembered as the husband of Belle Reeves, who succeeded him in the Legislature before becoming the first female Washington Secretary of State in 1938 upon her appointment by Governor Clarence Martin (and just the second woman to hold statewide elective office in Washington, after Josephine Preston). Frank died while cheering on Belle in a floor fight as she sought to maintain support for prohibition in the state House of Representatives in 1933.

== Early life ==
Frank met his future wife, then Anna Belle Culp, after her family moved when she was 17 to Geneseo, Kansas, where he was a local newspaper publisher; they married in 1888. In 1889, they moved to Spokane and lost a baby in childbirth.

Seeking opportunity in the gold and silver mines outside Coeur d'Alene, they moved to Idaho, but found little success and in 1890 lost another baby. They taught for a year in Post Falls, Idaho, until they had saved enough to move to Ellensburg, Washington. There, they founded Ellensburg's first newspaper, with Belle working as a printer's devil and hand-setting all the type.

1891 saw the birth of their first surviving child, daughter Zelma, as well as their move to Wenatchee, Washington. There, they again founded the town's first newspaper, The Advance. They sold it in 1893, moved to Leavenworth, Washington, and for the third town in a row, founded the first newspaper, The Leavenworth Times. However, the Times was not profitable, and Belle took on other work alongside it.

In 1900, Belle and Frank returned to Wenatchee. Frank and his brother Fred went into law practice together, while Belle left work to raise Zelma and began volunteering with numerous organizations, including the Woman's Christian Temperance Union. Belle helped Frank study law and establish his practice, eventually going on to receive her own law degree from the University of Washington. Frank later became President of the Washington State Bar Association.

== Political career and later life ==
Reeves won election to the Legislature in 1914, representing Chelan County and the 56th legislative district (later dissolved in 1933) for one term. He later became a judge. In 1922, after Reeves had retired and with their daughter Zelma grown, wife Belle won the House of Representatives seat in Washington's 12th legislative district that Frank had previously held. Her candidacy resulted from her wide community involvement in Wenatchee: she won her primary by 100 votes when a group of Wenatchee women chose her as their write-in candidate without her prior knowledge or consent. Frank was initially displeased with Belle's unexpected "honor," but later became her fierce supporter.

== Death ==
In 1933, tragedy struck as Belle led a floor fight against an effort to support federal repeal of the Eighteenth Amendment (prohibition). Frank stood at the rear of the House chamber cheering, when he suddenly collapsed and was pronounced dead on the scene by a doctor serving in the Senate. He died of a cerebral hemorrhage related to injuries he sustained in a car accident the previous August in which he sustained multiple fractures, including to his skull.
