= Union Township, Logan County, Ohio =

Township in Ohio, US

- Township
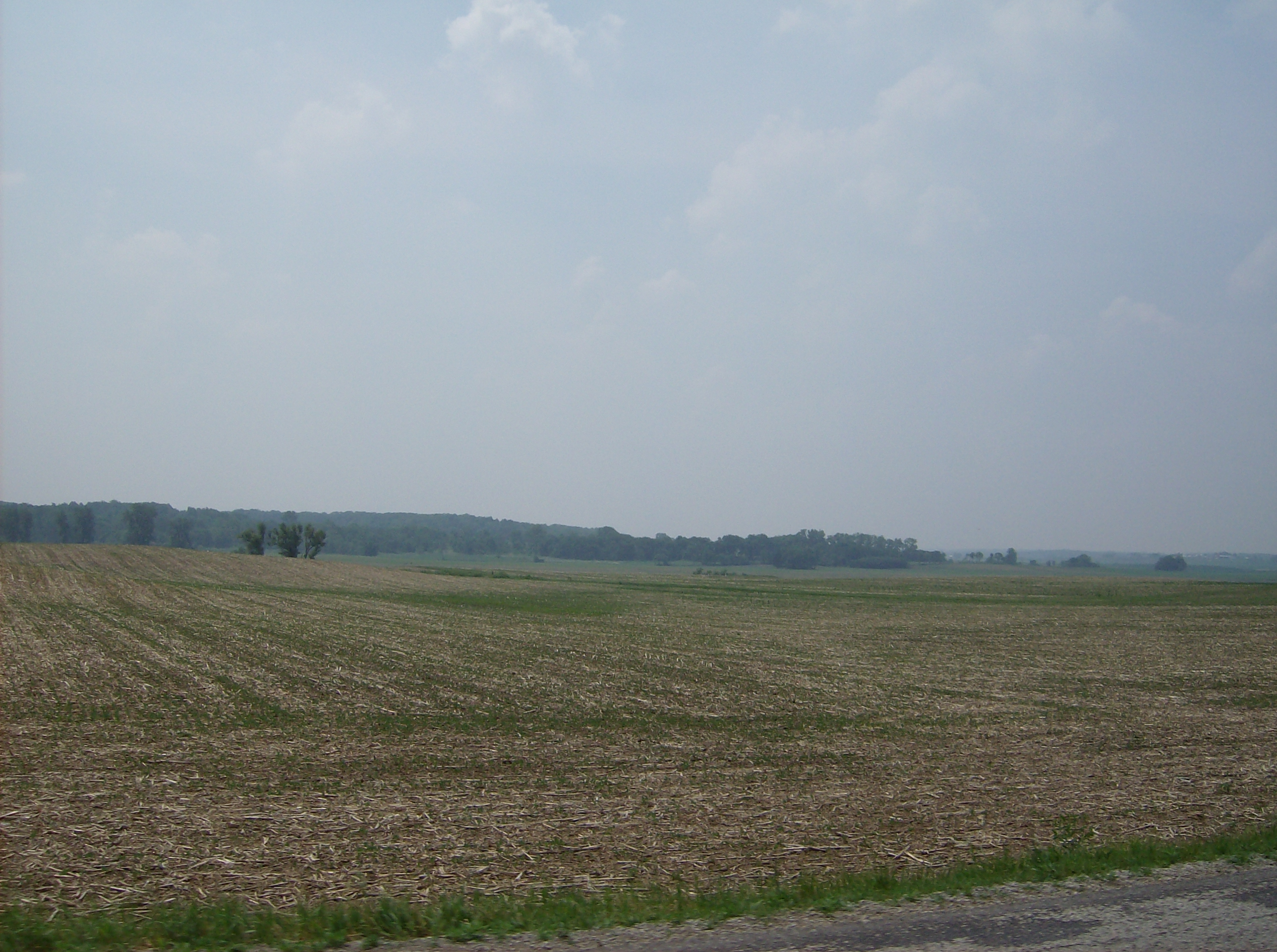
- Hills and farmland cover most of Union Township.

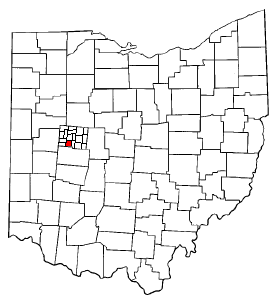
- Location of Union Township in Ohio

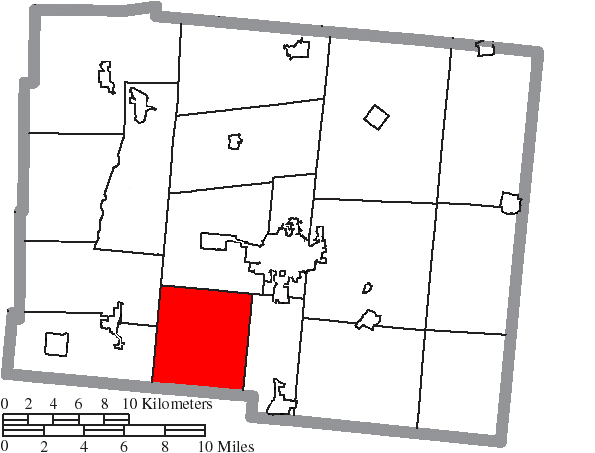
- Location of Union Township in Logan County
- Coordinates: 40°18′6″N 83°49′26″W
- Country: United States
- State: Ohio
- County: Logan

Area
  - Total: 22.98 sq mi (59.51 km^{2})
  - Land: 22.89 sq mi (59.29 km^{2})
  - Water: 0.085 sq mi (0.22 km^{2})
- Elevation: 1,040 ft (320 m)

Population (2020)
  - Total: 755
  - Density: 33.0/sq mi (12.7/km^{2})
- Time zone: UTC-5 (Eastern (EST))
  - Summer (DST): UTC-4 (EDT)
- Area codes: 937, 326
- FIPS code: 39-78414
- GNIS feature ID: 1086495

Union Township is one of the seventeen townships of Logan County, Ohio, United States. As of the 2020 census, the population was 755.

== Geography ==
Located in the southwestern part of the county, it borders the following townships:

- Harrison Township - north
- Liberty Township - east
- Harrison Township, Champaign County - south
- Miami Township - southwest
- Pleasant Township - northwest

No municipalities are located in Union Township.

== Name and history ==
Union Township was formed in 1820. It is one of twenty-seven Union Townships statewide.

== Government ==
The township is governed by a three-member board of trustees, who are elected in November of odd-numbered years to a four-year term beginning on the following January 1. Two are elected in the year after the presidential election and one is elected in the year before it. There is also an elected township fiscal officer, who serves a four-year term beginning on April 1 of the year after the election, which is held in November of the year before the presidential election. Vacancies in the fiscal officership or on the board of trustees are filled by the remaining trustees.

== Transportation ==
State Route 508 passes through Union Township.
