= Harrison Township, Ohio =

Harrison Township, Ohio, may refer to:

- Harrison Township, Carroll County, Ohio
- Harrison Township, Champaign County, Ohio
- Harrison Township, Darke County, Ohio
- Harrison Township, Gallia County, Ohio
- Harrison Township, Hamilton County, Ohio
- Harrison Township, Henry County, Ohio
- Harrison Township, Knox County, Ohio
- Harrison Township, Licking County, Ohio
- Harrison Township, Logan County, Ohio
- Harrison Township, Montgomery County, Ohio
- Harrison Township, Muskingum County, Ohio
- Harrison Township, Paulding County, Ohio
- Harrison Township, Perry County, Ohio
- Harrison Township, Pickaway County, Ohio
- Harrison Township, Preble County, Ohio
- Harrison Township, Ross County, Ohio
- Harrison Township, Scioto County, Ohio
- Harrison Township, Van Wert County, Ohio
- Harrison Township, Vinton County, Ohio
