= Liberty Township, Logan County, Ohio =

Township in Ohio, US

- Township
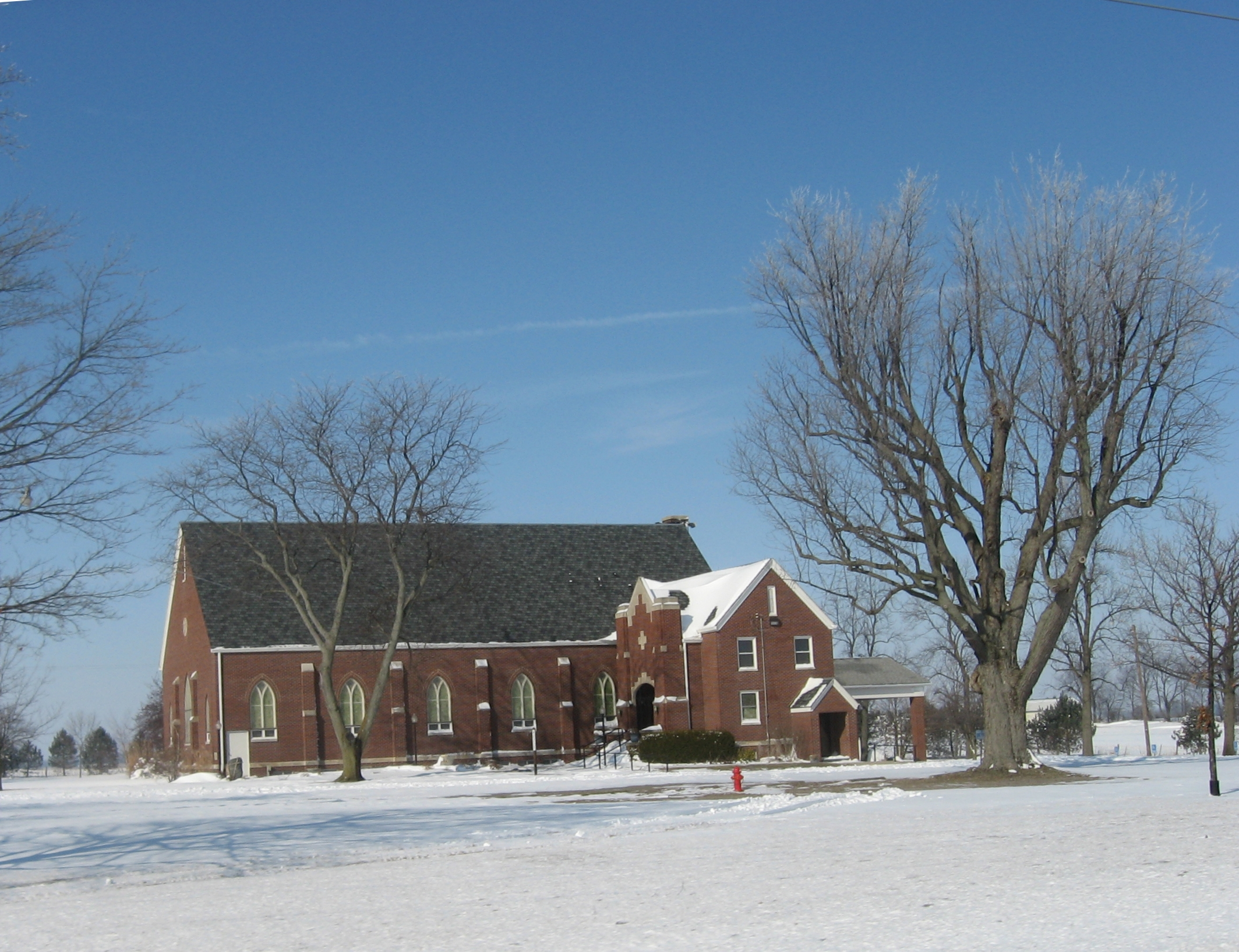
- South Union Mennonite Church, along U.S. Route 68 just north of West Liberty

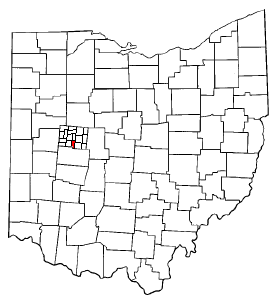
- Location of Liberty Township in Ohio

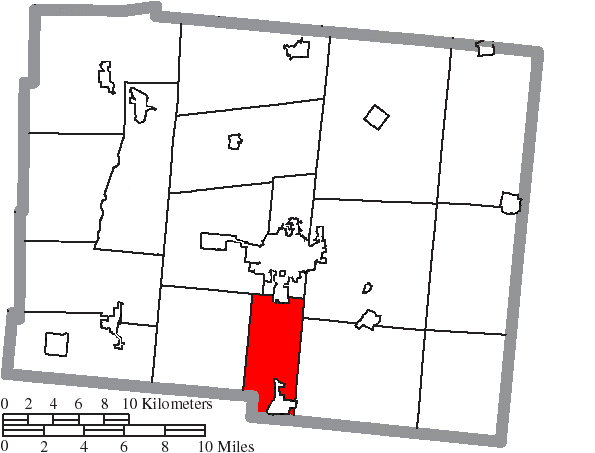
- Location of Liberty Township in Logan County
- Coordinates: 40°15′48″N 83°45′26″W
- Country: United States
- State: Ohio
- County: Logan

Area
  - Total: 15.27 sq mi (39.54 km^{2})
  - Land: 15.25 sq mi (39.51 km^{2})
  - Water: 0.015 sq mi (0.04 km^{2})
- Elevation: 1,145 ft (349 m)

Population (2020)
  - Total: 3,891
  - Density: 255.1/sq mi (98.48/km^{2})
- Time zone: UTC-5 (Eastern (EST))
  - Summer (DST): UTC-4 (EDT)
- Area codes: 937, 326
- FIPS code: 39-43246
- GNIS feature ID: 1086486

Liberty Township is one of the seventeen townships of Logan County, Ohio, United States. As of the 2020 census, the population was 3,891.

== Geography ==
Located in the southern part of the county, it borders the following townships:

- Lake Township - north
- Jefferson Township - northeast
- Monroe Township - east
- Salem Township, Champaign County - south
- Harrison Township, Champaign County - southwest
- Union Township - west
- Harrison Township - northwest

Two municipalities are located in Liberty Township: most of the village of West Liberty, in the south, and part of the city of Bellefontaine, the county seat of Logan County, in the north.

== Name and history ==
Liberty Township was organized in 1836. It is one of twenty-five Liberty Townships statewide.

== Government ==
The township is governed by a three-member board of trustees, who are elected in November of odd-numbered years to a four-year term beginning on the following January 1. Two are elected in the year after the presidential election and one is elected in the year before it. There is also an elected fiscal officer, who serves a four-year term beginning on April 1 of the year after the election, which is held in November of the year before the presidential election. Vacancies in the fiscal officer position or on the board of trustees are filled by the remaining trustees.

== Transportation ==
U.S. Route 68 is the most important highway in Liberty Township. Other significant highways in the township include State Routes 245 and 508.
