= Harrison Township, Champaign County, Ohio =

Township in Ohio, US

- Township
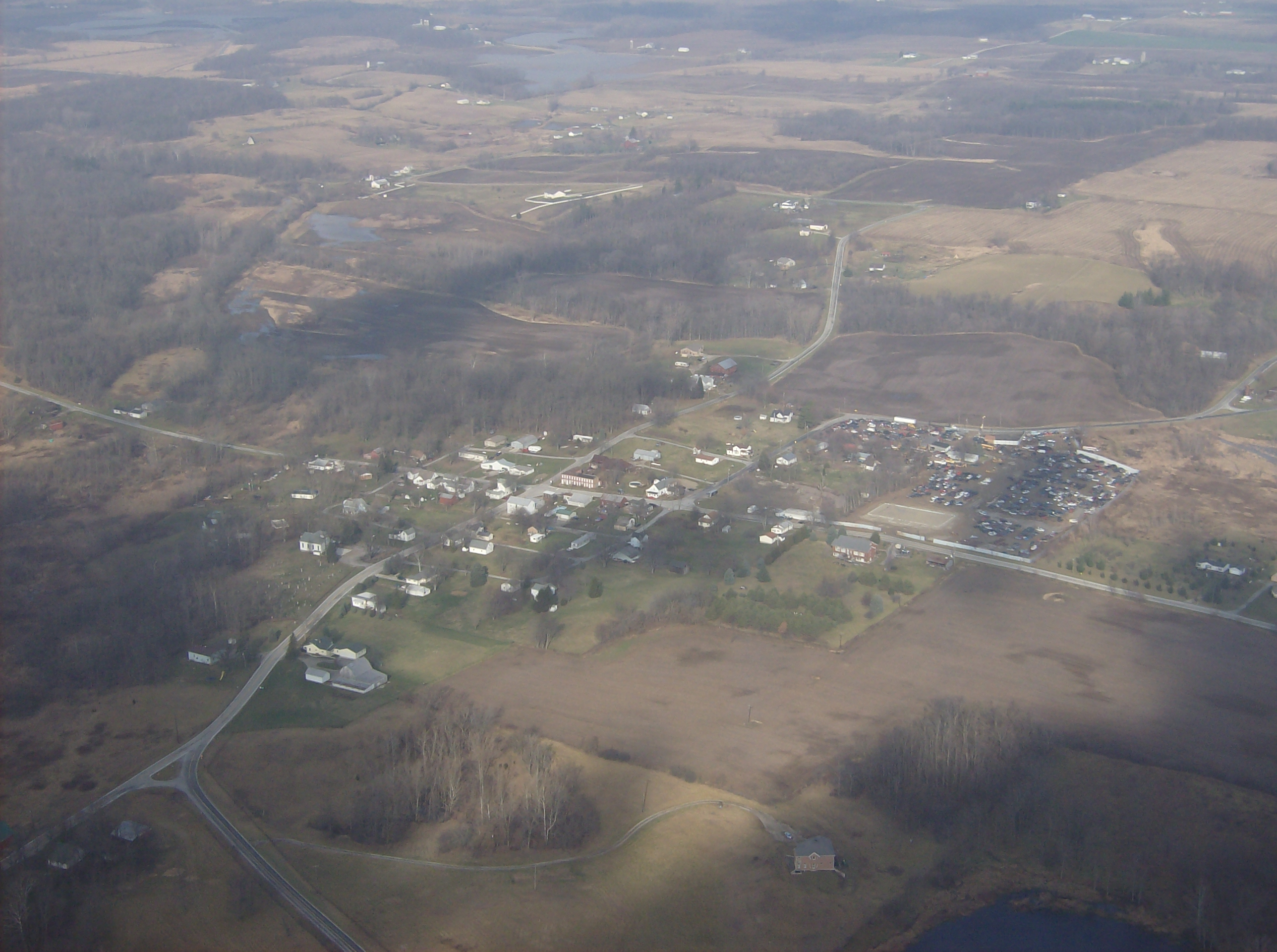
- Aerial view of Springhills

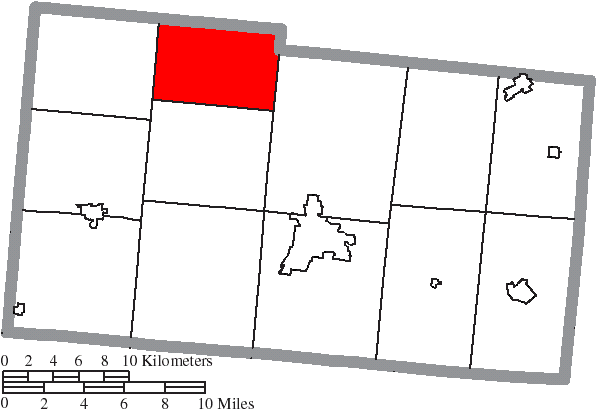
- Location of Harrison Township in Champaign County
- Coordinates: 40°14′25″N 83°51′4″W
- Country: United States
- State: Ohio
- County: Champaign

Area
  - Total: 24.4 sq mi (63.1 km^{2})
  - Land: 24.4 sq mi (63.2 km^{2})
  - Water: 0.039 sq mi (0.1 km^{2})
- Elevation: 1,086 ft (331 m)

Population (2020)
  - Total: 882
  - Density: 36.1/sq mi (14.0/km^{2})
- Time zone: UTC-5 (Eastern (EST))
  - Summer (DST): UTC-4 (EDT)
- FIPS code: 39-33796
- GNIS feature ID: 1085841

Harrison Township is one of the twelve townships of Champaign County, Ohio, United States. As of the 2020 census the population was 882.

== Geography ==
Located in the northwestern part of the county, it borders the following townships:

- Union Township, Logan County - north
- Liberty Township, Logan County - northeast
- Salem Township - east
- Concord Township - south
- Adams Township - west
- Miami Township, Logan County - northwest

No municipalities are located in Harrison Township, although the unincorporated community of Springhills is located in the township's northwest.

== Name and history ==
It is one of nineteen Harrison Townships statewide.

== Government ==
The township is governed by a three-member board of trustees, who are elected in November of odd-numbered years to a four-year term beginning on the following January 1. Two are elected in the year after the presidential election and one is elected in the year before it. There is also an elected township fiscal officer, who serves a four-year term beginning on April 1 of the year after the election, which is held in November of the year before the presidential election. Vacancies in the fiscal officership or on the board of trustees are filled by the remaining trustees.
