= Quincy, Ohio =

- Village
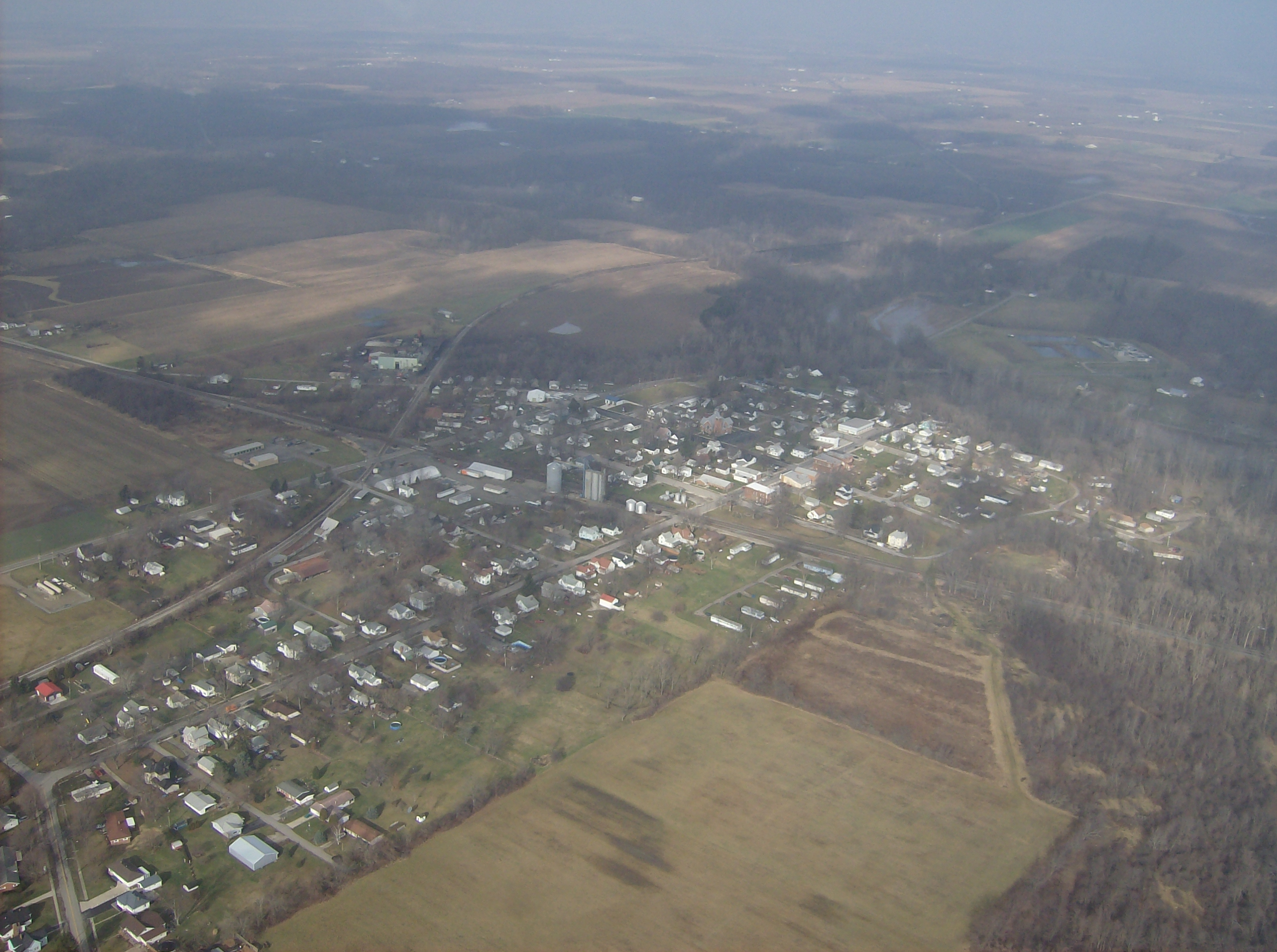
- Aerial view of Quincy from the southeast

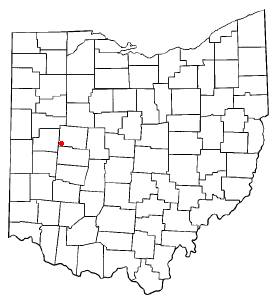
- Location of Quincy, Ohio

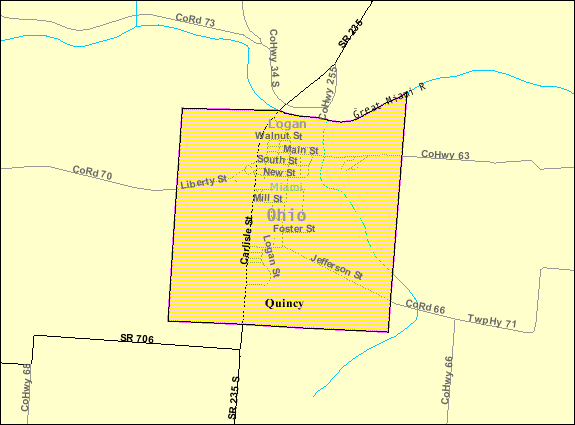
- Detailed map of Quincy
- Coordinates: 40°17′44″N 83°58′07″W
- Country: United States
- State: Ohio
- County: Logan
- Township: Miami

Area
  - Total: 1.12 sq mi (2.90 km^{2})
  - Land: 1.12 sq mi (2.90 km^{2})
  - Water: 0 sq mi (0.00 km^{2})
- Elevation: 1,060 ft (320 m)

Population (2020)
  - Total: 536
  - Density: 478.3/sq mi (184.67/km^{2})
- Time zone: UTC-5 (Eastern (EST))
  - Summer (DST): UTC-4 (EDT)
- ZIP code: 43343
- Area codes: 937, 326
- FIPS code: 39-65200
- GNIS feature ID: 2399032
- Website: https://quincyohio.com/

Quincy is a village in Logan County, Ohio, United States. The population was 536 at the 2020 census.

== History ==
Quincy was laid out in 1830, and named for John Quincy Adams, sixth President of the United States.

== Geography ==
According to the United States Census Bureau, the village has a total area of 1.13 square miles (2.93 km^{2}), all of it land.

== Demographics ==
Historical population
Census	Pop.	Note	%±
1850	373		—
1860	290		−22.3%
1870	320		10.3%
1880	442		38.1%
1890	488		10.4%
1900	642		31.6%
1910	594		−7.5%
1920	474		−20.2%
1930	500		5.5%
1940	536		7.2%
1950	616		14.9%
1960	668		8.4%
1970	686		2.7%
1980	633		−7.7%
1990	697		10.1%
2000	734		5.3%
2010	706		−3.8%
2020	536		−24.1%
U.S. Decennial Census

=== 2010 census ===
As of the census of 2010, there were 706 people, 240 households, and 191 families living in the village. The population density was 624.8 inhabitants per square mile (241.2/km^{2}). There were 280 housing units at an average density of 247.8 per square mile (95.7/km^{2}). The racial makeup of the village was 96.5% White, 0.3% African American, 0.4% Native American, 0.1% Asian, 0.3% from other races, and 2.4% from two or more races. Hispanic or Latino of any race were 0.6% of the population.

There were 240 households, of which 43.8% had children under the age of 18 living with them, 55.4% were married couples living together, 15.4% had a female householder with no husband present, 8.8% had a male householder with no wife present, and 20.4% were non-families. 16.3% of all households were made up of individuals, and 3.7% had someone living alone who was 65 years of age or older. The average household size was 2.94 and the average family size was 3.25.

The median age in the village was 33.2 years. 31.3% of residents were under the age of 18; 7.8% were between the ages of 18 and 24; 25.6% were from 25 to 44; 26.9% were from 45 to 64; and 8.4% were 65 years of age or older. The gender makeup of the village was 49.9% male and 50.1% female.

=== 2000 census ===
As of the census of 2000, there were 734 people, 256 households, and 199 families living in the village. The population density was 648.2 inhabitants per square mile (250.3/km^{2}). There were 273 housing units at an average density of 241.1 per square mile (93.1/km^{2}). The racial makeup of the village was 98.23% White, 0.14% African American, 0.14% Native American, 0.14% Asian, 0.14% Pacific Islander, and 1.23% from two or more races. Hispanic or Latino of any race were 0.68% of the population.

There were 256 households, out of which 44.9% had children under the age of 18 living with them, 60.2% were married couples living together, 11.3% had a female householder with no husband present, and 21.9% were non-families. 18.8% of all households were made up of individuals, and 7.8% had someone living alone who was 65 years of age or older. The average household size was 2.87 and the average family size was 3.28.

In the village, the population was spread out, with 33.5% under the age of 18, 8.3% from 18 to 24, 28.2% from 25 to 44, 20.4% from 45 to 64, and 9.5% who were 65 years of age or older. The median age was 31 years. For every 100 females, there were 101.1 males. For every 100 females age 18 and over, there were 98.4 males.

The median income for a household in the village was $31,250, and the median income for a family was $36,375. Males had a median income of $31,607 versus $23,750 for females. The per capita income for the village was $14,808. About 11.0% of families and 14.9% of the population were below the poverty line, including 16.8% of those under age 18 and 5.1% of those age 65 or over.

== Transportation ==
State Route 235 passes through Quincy from north to south. Located just south of the village limits is the eastern end of State Route 706, which begins at an intersection with State Route 235.

== Notable people ==
- Belle Reeves, first female Secretary of State of Washington, was born in Quincy in 1871.

== Gallery ==
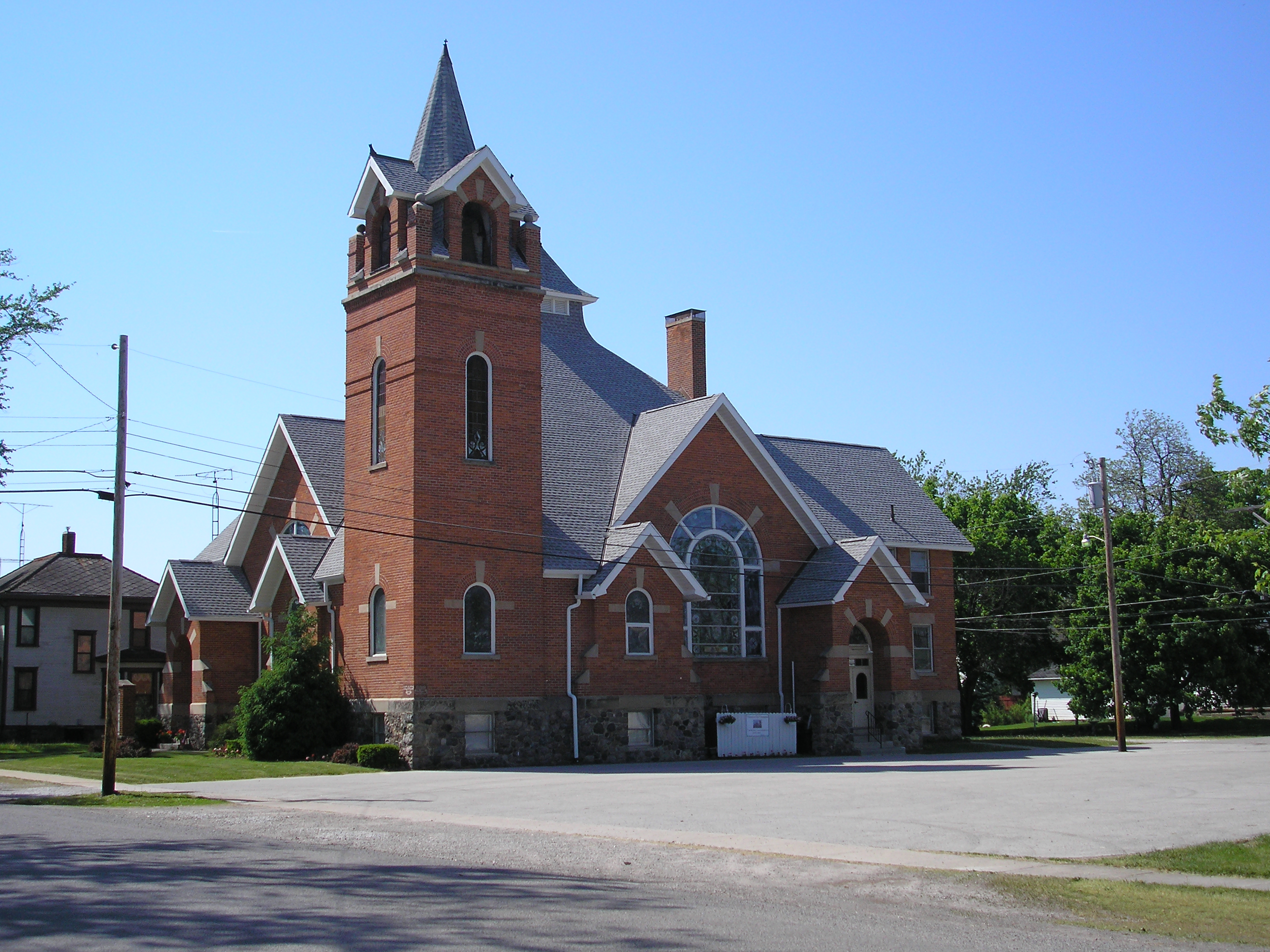
Quincy United Methodist Church

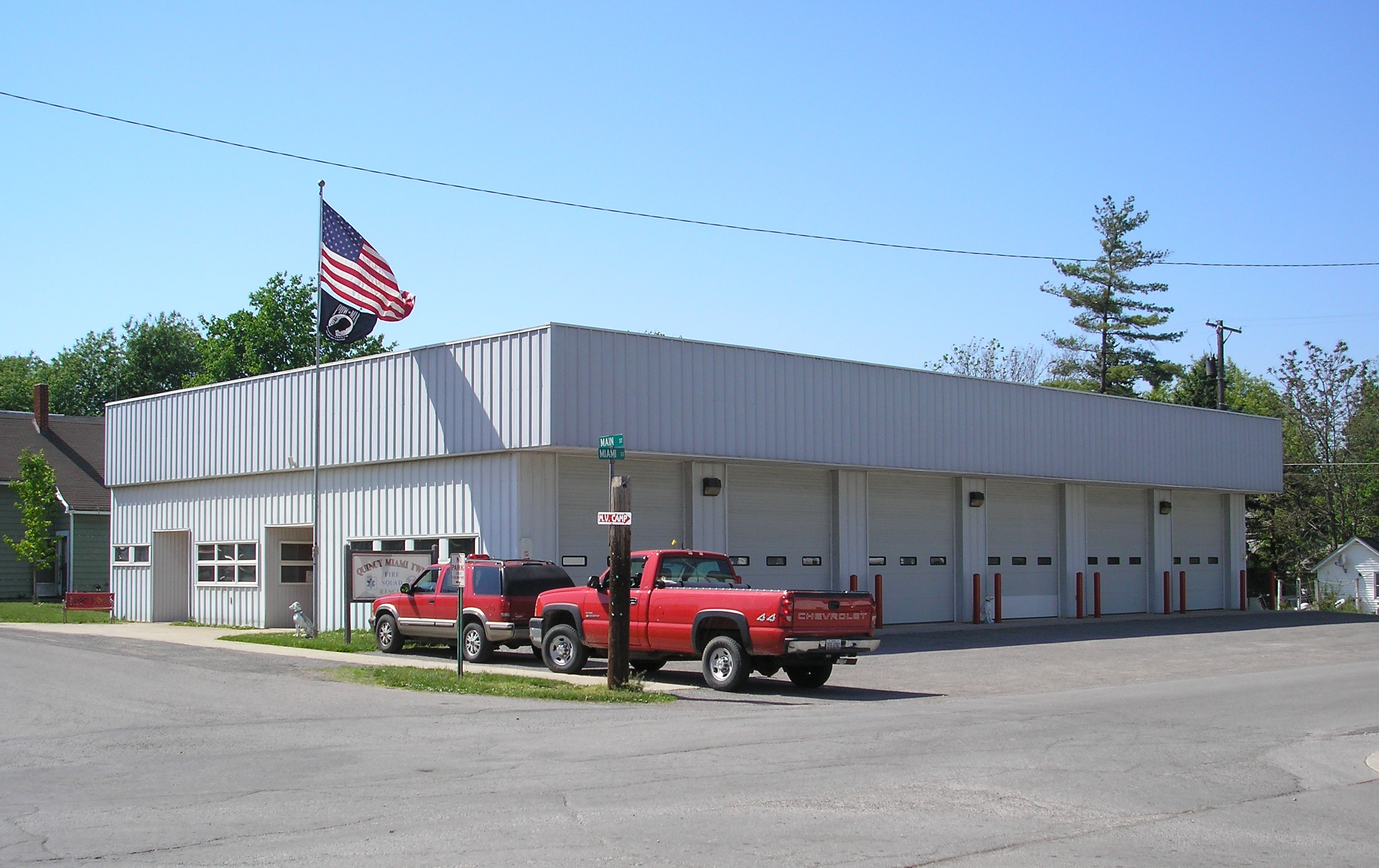
Quincy Miami Fire Station

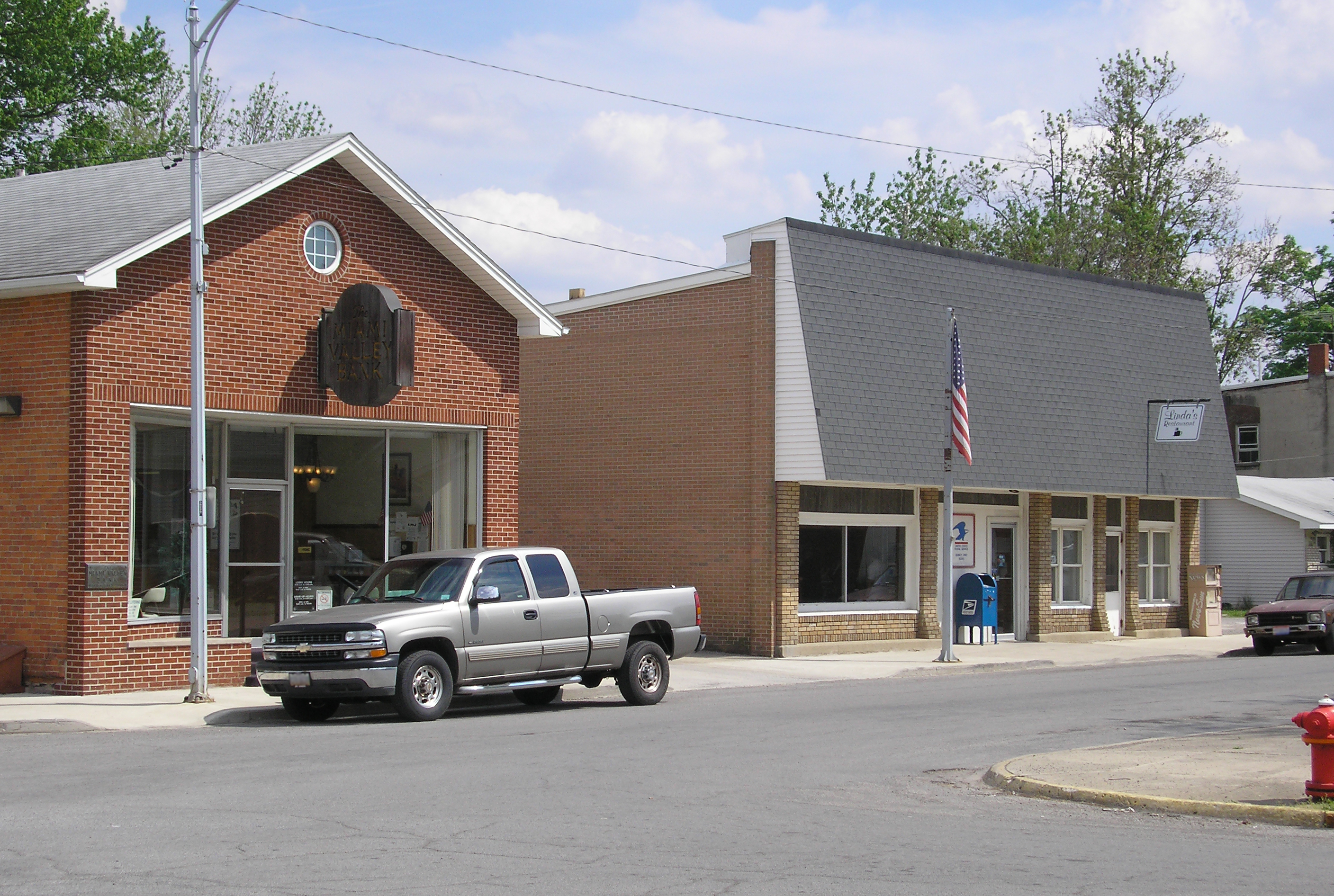
North Miami Street with Bank, Post Office and Town Restaurant

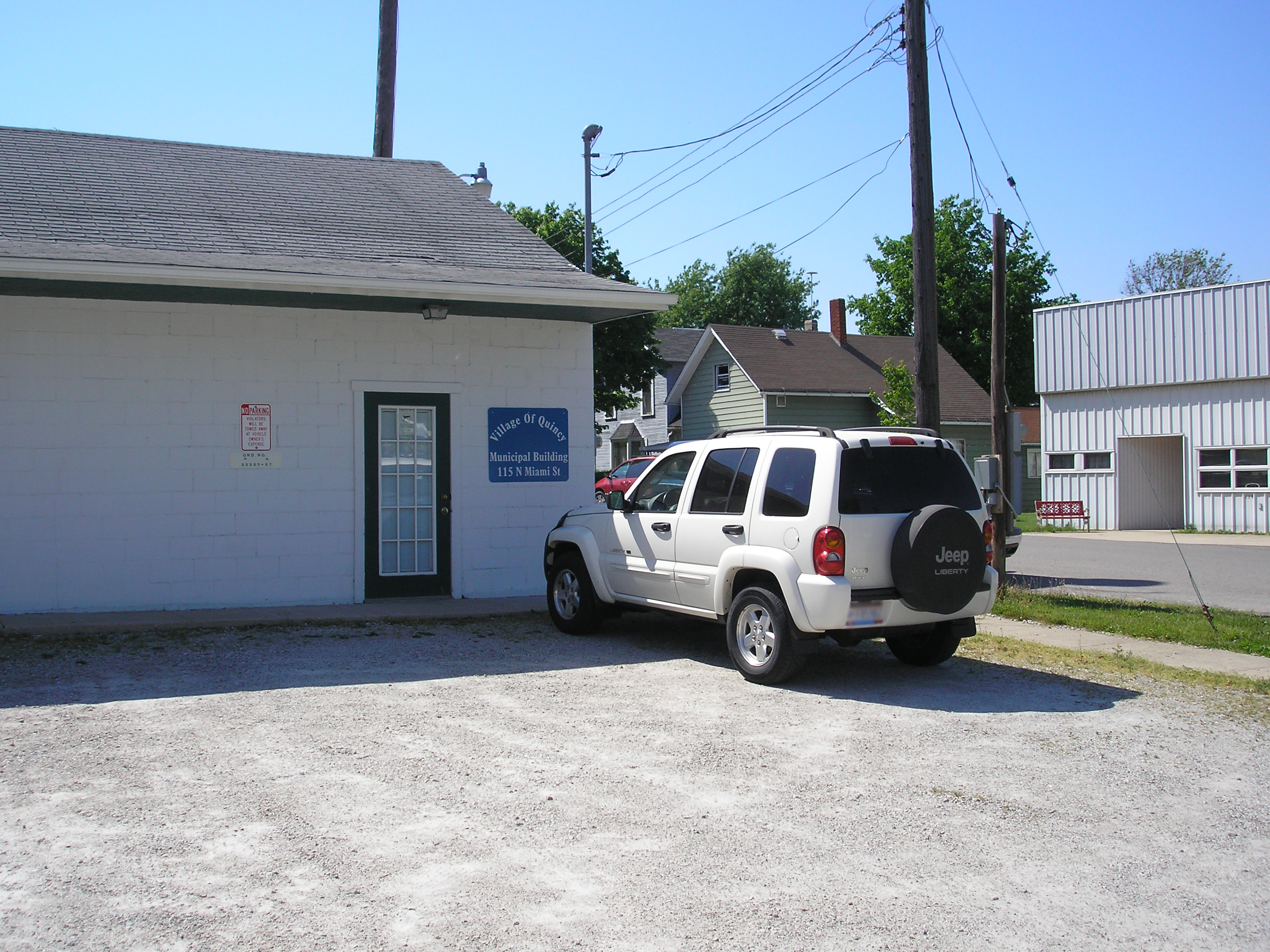
Quincy Municipal Building
