= Pemberton, Ohio =

Unincorporated community in Ohio, U.S.

Coordinates: 40°17′41″N 84°01′57″W

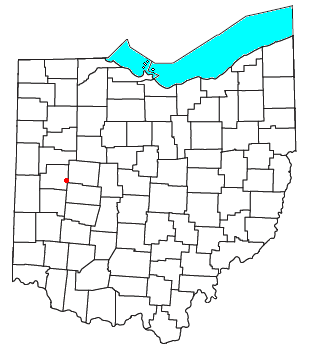
Location of Pemberton, Ohio

Pemberton is an unincorporated community in eastern Perry Township, Shelby County, Ohio, United States. It has a post office with the ZIP code 45353.

== History ==
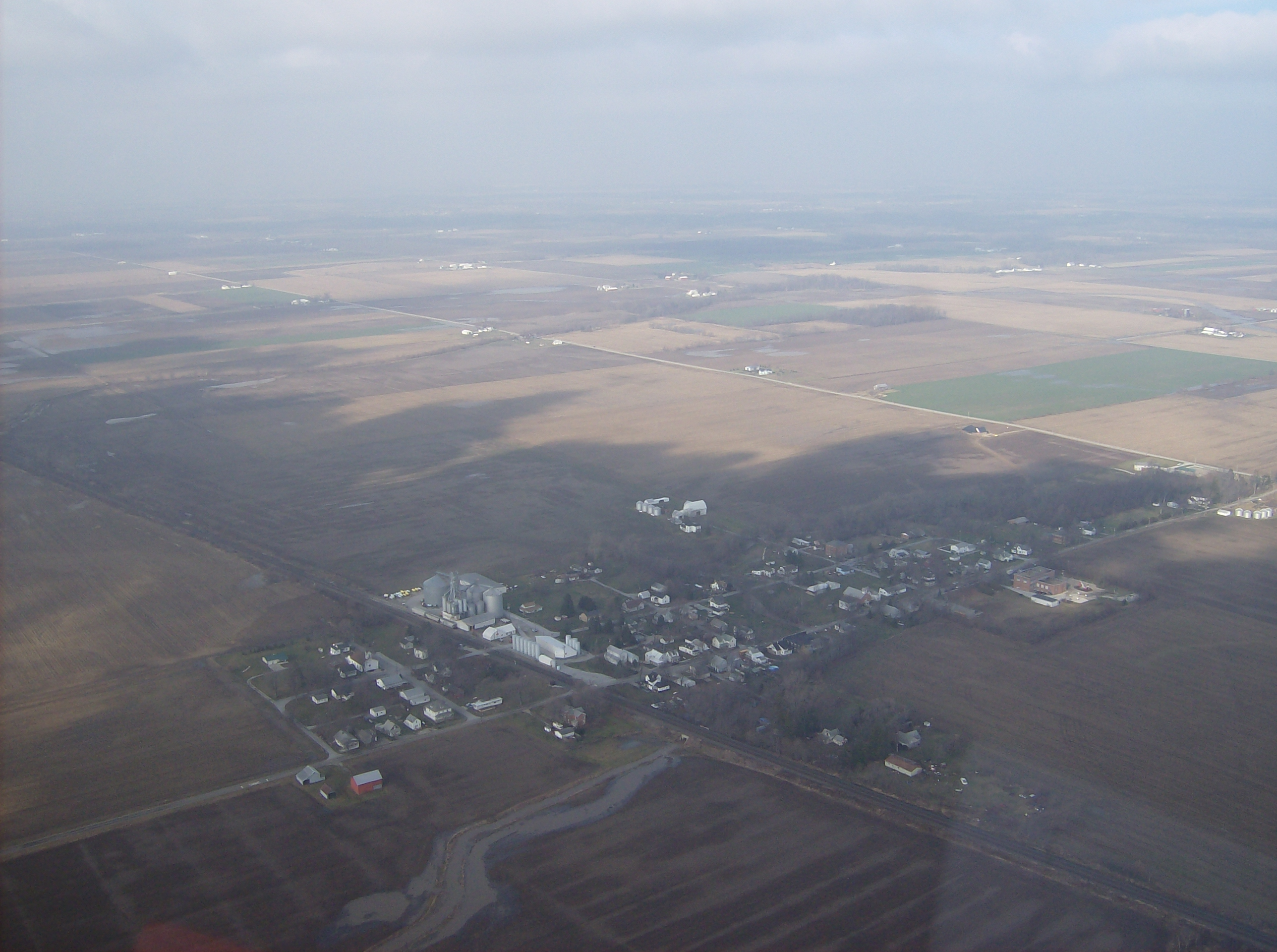
Aerial view of Pemberton from the southeast

Pemberton was platted in 1852, and named for General Pemberton, the brother of a railroad official. A post office called Pemberton has been in operation since 1854.
