= Bloomfield Township, Logan County, Ohio =

Township in Ohio, US

- Township
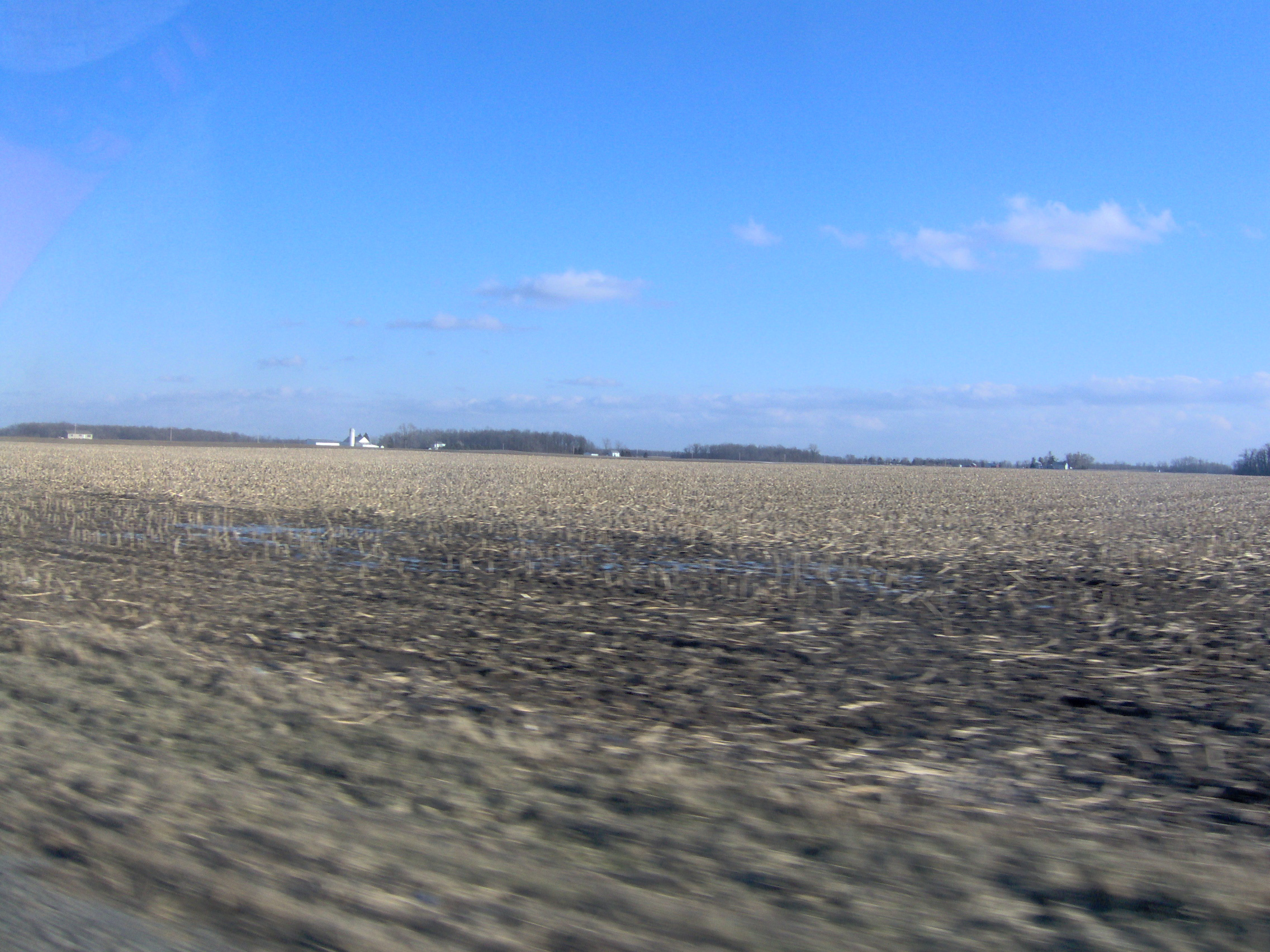
- Bloomfield Township consists generally of flat farmland with scattered copses of trees.

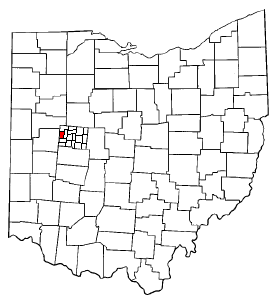
- Location of Bloomfield Township in Ohio

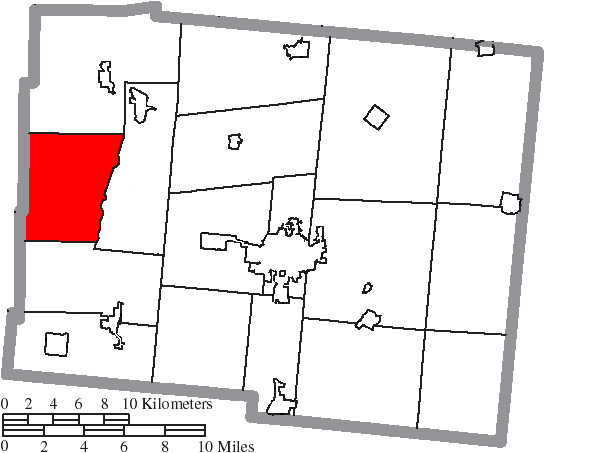
- Location of Bloomfield Township in Logan County
- Coordinates: 40°24′38″N 83°58′2″W
- Country: United States
- State: Ohio
- County: Logan

Area
  - Total: 22.83 sq mi (59.12 km^{2})
  - Land: 59.08 sq mi (153.0 km^{2})
  - Water: 0.04 sq mi (0.10 km^{2})
- Elevation: 1,004 ft (306 m)

Population (2020)
  - Total: 417
  - Density: 18.3/sq mi (7.05/km^{2})
- Time zone: UTC-5 (Eastern (EST))
  - Summer (DST): UTC-4 (EDT)
- Area codes: 937, 326
- FIPS code: 39-07118
- GNIS feature ID: 1086481

Bloomfield Township is one of the seventeen townships of Logan County, Ohio, United States. As of the 2020 census the population was 417, making Bloomfield the smallest township in Logan County by population.

== Geography ==
Located in the western part of the county, it borders the following townships:

- Stokes Township - north
- Washington Township - east
- Pleasant Township - south
- Salem Township, Shelby County - southwest
- Jackson Township, Shelby County - west

No municipalities are located within Bloomfield Township.

== Name and history ==
Bloomfield Township was organized in 1832. Statewide, other Bloomfield Townships are located in Jackson and Trumbull counties.

== Government ==
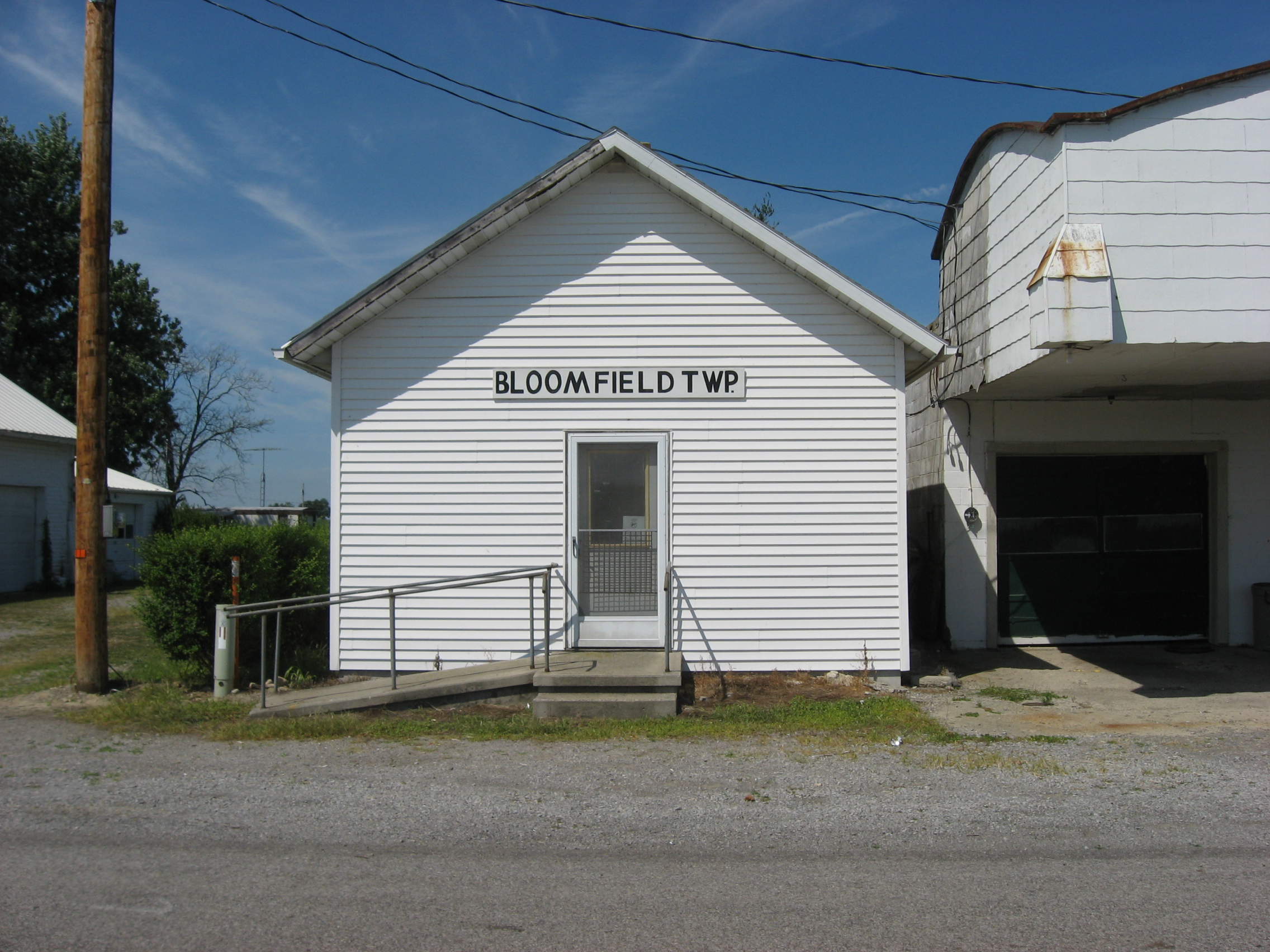
Township hall at Bloom Center

The township is governed by a three-member board of trustees, who are elected in November of odd-numbered years to a four-year term beginning on the following January 1. Two are elected in the year after the presidential election and one is elected in the year before it. There is also an elected township fiscal officer, who serves a four-year term beginning on April 1 of the year after the election, which is held in November of the year before the presidential election. Vacancies in the fiscal officership or on the board of trustees are filled by the remaining trustees.

== Transportation ==
State Route 274 passes through the northern part of Bloomfield Township.
