= Pasco, Ohio =

Unincorporated community in Ohio, U.S.

Coordinates: 40°17′00″N 84°06′03″W

Pasco is an unincorporated community in Shelby County, in the U.S. state of Ohio. It is located in the township of Perry.

== History ==
A post office called Pasco was established in 1893, and remained in operation until 1905. Besides the post office, Pasco had a country store.
