= Perry Township, Shelby County, Ohio =

Township in Ohio, US

- Township
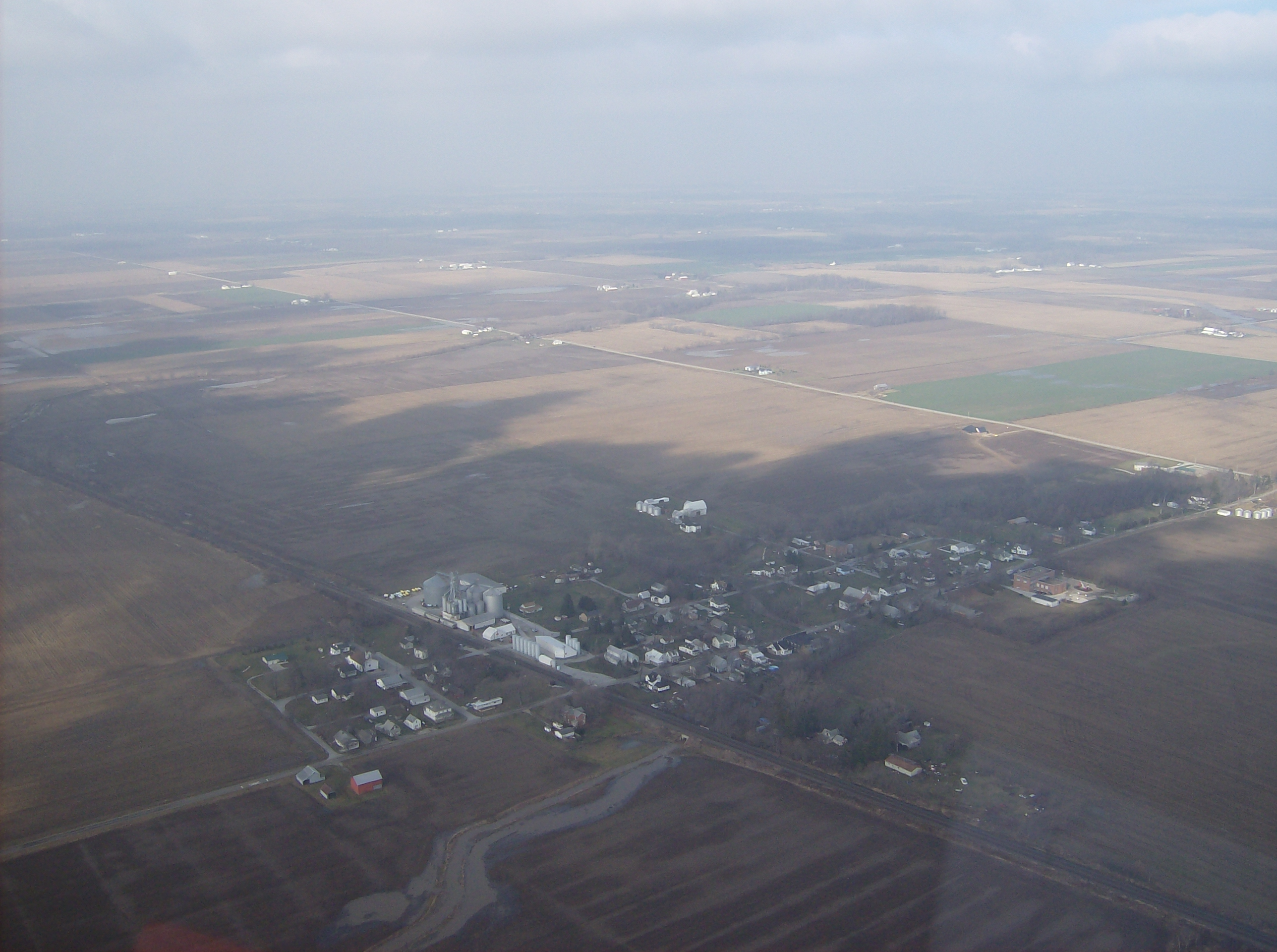
- Countryside in eastern Perry Township, with Pemberton in the foreground

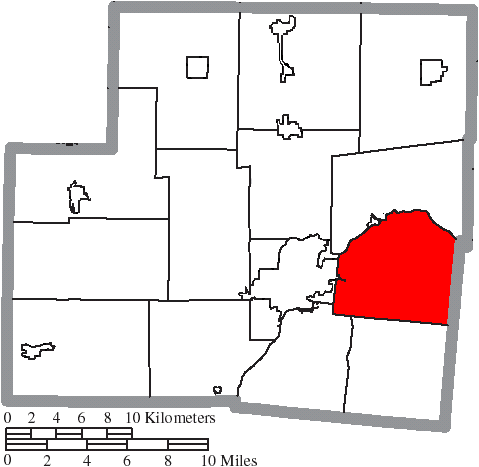
- Location of Perry Township in Shelby County
- Coordinates: 40°17′11″N 84°4′24″W
- Country: United States
- State: Ohio
- County: Shelby

Area
  - Total: 28.1 sq mi (72.9 km^{2})
  - Land: 28.1 sq mi (72.9 km^{2})
  - Water: 0 sq mi (0.0 km^{2})
- Elevation: 1,060 ft (323 m)

Population (2020)
  - Total: 982
  - Density: 34.9/sq mi (13.5/km^{2})
- Time zone: UTC-5 (Eastern (EST))
  - Summer (DST): UTC-4 (EDT)
- FIPS code: 39-62064
- GNIS feature ID: 1086967

Perry Township is one of the fourteen townships of Shelby County, Ohio, United States. The 2020 census found 982 people in the township.

== Geography ==
Located in the eastern part of the county, it borders the following townships:

- Salem Township – north
- Miami Township, Logan County – northeast
- Adams Township, Champaign County – southeast
- Green Township – south
- Orange Township – southwest
- Clinton Township – west

A small portion of the city of Sidney, the county seat of Shelby County, is located in far western Perry Township, and the unincorporated communities of Pasco and Pemberton lie in the eastern part of the township.

== Name and history ==
Perry Township was established around 1824. It is one of twenty-six Perry Townships statewide.

== Government ==
The township is governed by a three-member board of trustees, who are elected in November of odd-numbered years to a four-year term beginning on the following January 1. Two are elected in the year after the presidential election and one is elected in the year before it. There is also an elected township fiscal officer, who serves a four-year term beginning on April 1 of the year after the election, which is held in November of the year before the presidential election. Vacancies in the fiscal officership or on the board of trustees are filled by the remaining trustees.
