= Lake Township, Logan County, Ohio =

Township in Ohio, US

- Township
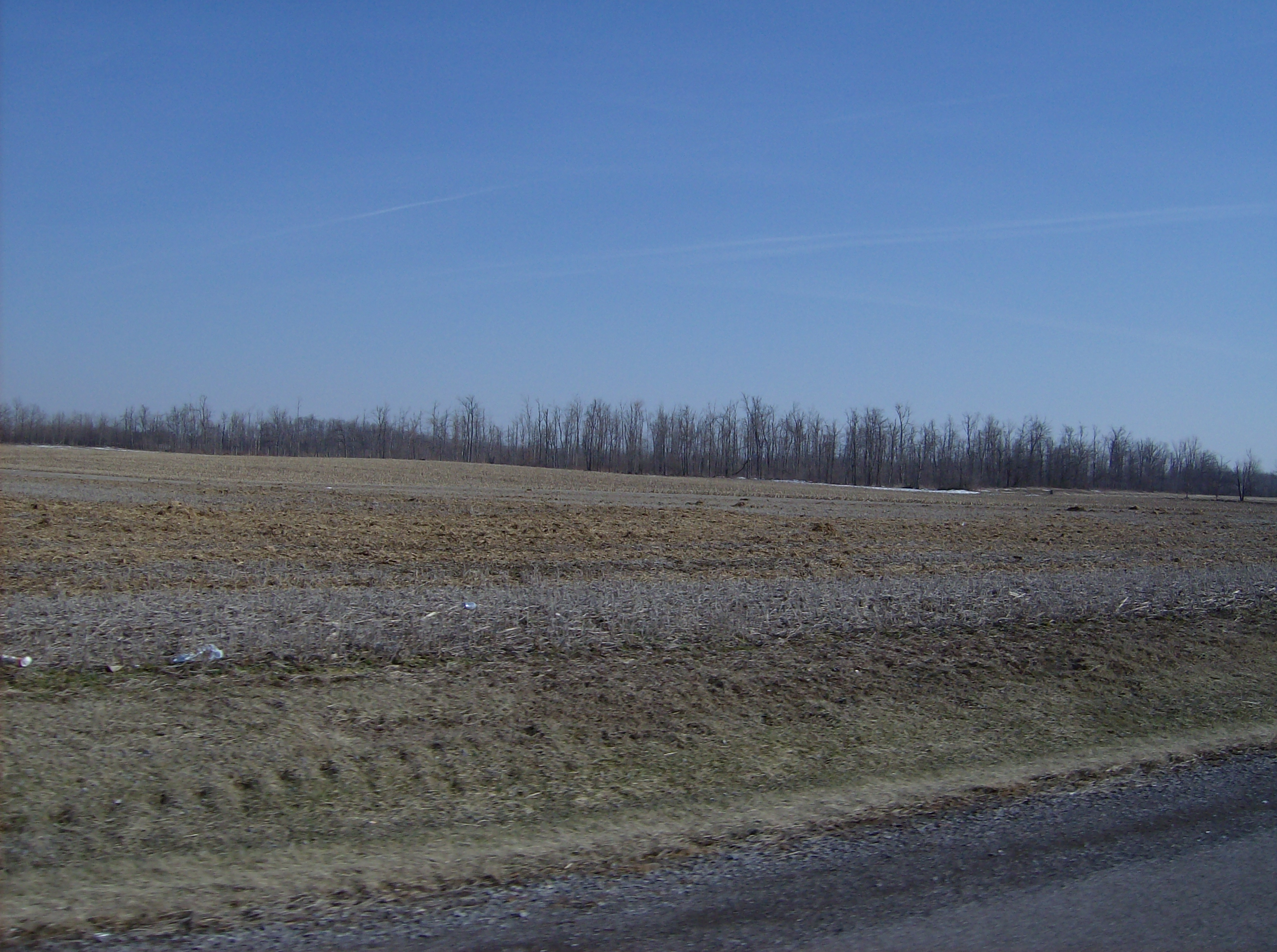
- Although much of Lake Township is occupied by the city of Bellefontaine, farms are found in the northern region of the township.

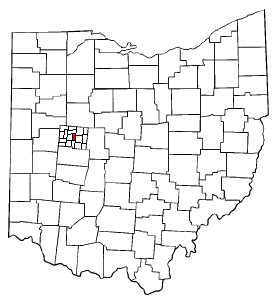
- Location of Lake Township in Ohio

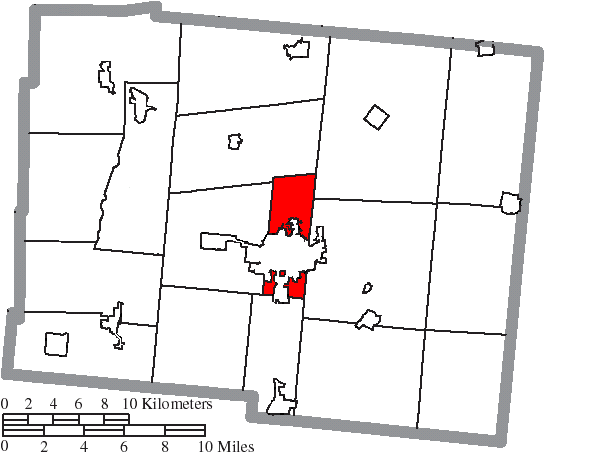
- Location of Lake Township in Logan County
- Coordinates: 40°21′48″N 83°45′25″W
- Country: United States
- State: Ohio
- County: Logan

Area
  - Total: 12.42 sq mi (32.18 km^{2})
  - Land: 12.42 sq mi (32.16 km^{2})
  - Water: 0.0077 sq mi (0.02 km^{2})
- Elevation: 1,260 ft (380 m)

Population (2020)
  - Total: 12,774
  - Density: 1,029/sq mi (397.2/km^{2})
- Time zone: UTC-5 (Eastern (EST))
  - Summer (DST): UTC-4 (EDT)
- Area codes: 937, 326
- FIPS code: 39-41286
- GNIS feature ID: 1086485

Lake Township is one of the seventeen townships of Logan County, Ohio, United States. As of the 2020 census, the population was 12,774, making it the largest township in Logan County by population.

== Geography ==
Located at the center of the county, it borders the following townships:

- McArthur Township - north
- Rushcreek Township - northeast
- Jefferson Township - east
- Liberty Township - south
- Harrison Township - west

Most of the city of Bellefontaine, the county seat of Logan County, is located in Lake Township, occupying all but the northern, southeastern, and southwestern parts of the township.

== Name and history ==
Lake Township was organized in 1818. The township took its name from Silver Lake, which is now located in Harrison Township. Statewide, other Lake Townships are located in Ashland, Stark, and Wood counties.

== Government ==
The township is governed by a three-member board of trustees, who are elected in November of odd-numbered years to a four-year term beginning on the following January 1. Two are elected in the year after the presidential election and one is elected in the year before it. There is also an elected township fiscal officer, who serves a four-year term beginning on April 1 of the year after the election, which is held in November of the year before the presidential election. Vacancies in the fiscal officership or on the board of trustees are filled by the remaining trustees.

== Transportation ==
Highways in Lake Township include U.S. Routes 33 and 68, and State Routes 47 and 540.
