= Maurice Sweetman =

Irish Archdeacon

Maurice Sweetman (d 1427) was a 14th-century Archdeacon of Armagh.

A relative (possibly a nephew) of Milo Sweetman, Archbishop of Armagh, he was appointed Archdeacon before 1380 and was also Rector of Kilkelly and a Prebendary of Ferns.
