= Frank Manogue =

American politician

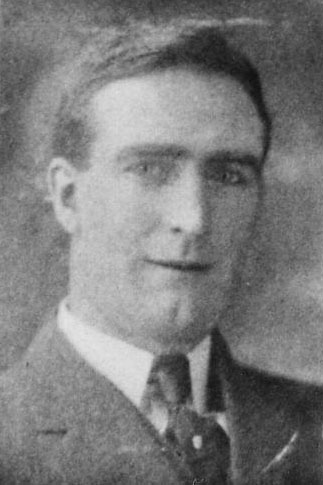
- Manogue in 1917

Member of the Washington House of Representatives for the 44th district
- In office 1915–1923

Personal details
- Born: April 30, 1882 Washington, United States
- Died: May 3, 1948 (aged 66) San Francisco County, California, United States
- Party: Republican

Frank Henry Manogue (April 30, 1882 – May 13, 1948) was an American politician in the state of Washington. He served in the Washington House of Representatives.
