= Philip D. Coombs =

- Born: November 2, 1946; Orlando, Florida
- Died: July 4, 2001 (aged 54); Tumwater, Washington
- Occupation: Archivist
- Spouse: Dale Linda Scamehorn
- Children: 3

Philip D. Coombs (November 2, 1946 - July 4, 2001) was the Washington State Archivist under Secretary of State Ralph Munroe and then under Secretary of State Sam Reed from October 1999 through his sudden death in July 2001.

== Education and family ==
Coombs was born in Orlando, Florida, on November 2, 1946. He graduated from Cocoa High School in Cocoa, Florida and then from the University of Florida in 1968, earning a Bachelor of Science in Geography. He also obtained a Master of Science in Systems Management in 1975 from the University of Southern California. He was an officer and pilot in the United States Air Force during the Vietnam War and was awarded a Distinguished Flying Cross for his heroic flying while delivering supplies to soldiers in a war zone while under fire from the enemy. He was honorably discharged at the rank of captain in 1973.

Coombs married his wife, Dale Linda Scamehorn, in April 1972 and had three children: Laura Kathleen Coombs (1975), David Andrew Coombs (1976), and Kevin Philip Coombs (1980). They lived in Gig Harbor and Olympia for many years and then subsequently divorced in 1992.

== Career ==
Coombs had 27 years of state service including work in the Department of Revenue, Department of Labor and Industries, Office of Financial Management, Department of Natural Resources, the Health Care Authority, and the Secretary of State's Office. He was also an instructor at South Puget Sound Community College where he taught business skills courses (and after his death a memorial scholarship fund was created and maintained at South Puget Sound Community College for a couple of years in his honor).

Coombs played a leading role in the beginnings of digital archiving and electronic data locating in the state of Washington and his work led to the funding and creation of the Washington State Digital Archives where digital information and systems are preserved for future generations. He was a project manager with the Washington State Library System prior to his role as State Archivist, where he was part of a team that implemented the creation of a process to assist the public with locating state and local government information, named the Government Information Locator Service (GILS) program. He also was instrumental in leading the team at the Washington State Library in establishing the library's Find-It! system in 1998.

During his work for Washington State Government Philip D. Coombs received many awards and accolades. He managed the project to move the state's L&I business from private company management to where it is now under the Department of Labor and Industries. In 1998 he was chosen to present the state's electronic information systems progress with META-Tag technology at the INET conference in Geneva, Switzerland.

== Death ==
Philip D. Coombs died on July 4, 2001, of a massive heart attack while sailing on Black Lake in Tumwater, Washington.

After his death a legal battle between Philip D. Coombs' children and Philip's former girlfriend, Linda F. McDonell, ensued, with his children asserting that there were changes made in his will after his death. A will contest was filed in the Thurston County Superior Court that continued until the case was mediated and a settlement was reached in 2002.
