= Ohio State Route 287 =

State highway in western Ohio, US

State Route 287

Route information
- Maintained by ODOT
- Length: 13.69 mi (22.03 km)
- Existed: 1931–present

Major junctions
- West end: SR 245 / CR 1 near West Liberty
- East end: US 33 / SR 739 near North Lewisburg

Location
- Country: United States
- State: Ohio
- Counties: Logan, Union

Highway system
- Ohio State Highway System; Interstate; US; State; Scenic
← SR 286	→ SR 288

State Route 287 (SR 287) is a 13.69-mile-long (22.03 km) east–west state highway in the western portion of the U.S. state of Ohio. The western terminus of SR 287 is at SR 245 nearly 1.75 miles (2.82 km) east of West Liberty. Its eastern terminus is at an interchange with U.S. Route 33 (US 33) about 5.25 miles (8.45 km) northeast of North Lewisburg that dually serves as the southern terminus of SR 739.

This two-lane state route was created in the early 1930s. Until an extension in the late 1990s, SR 287 was entirely within Logan County. The extension into Union County was formerly part of US 33.

== Route description ==
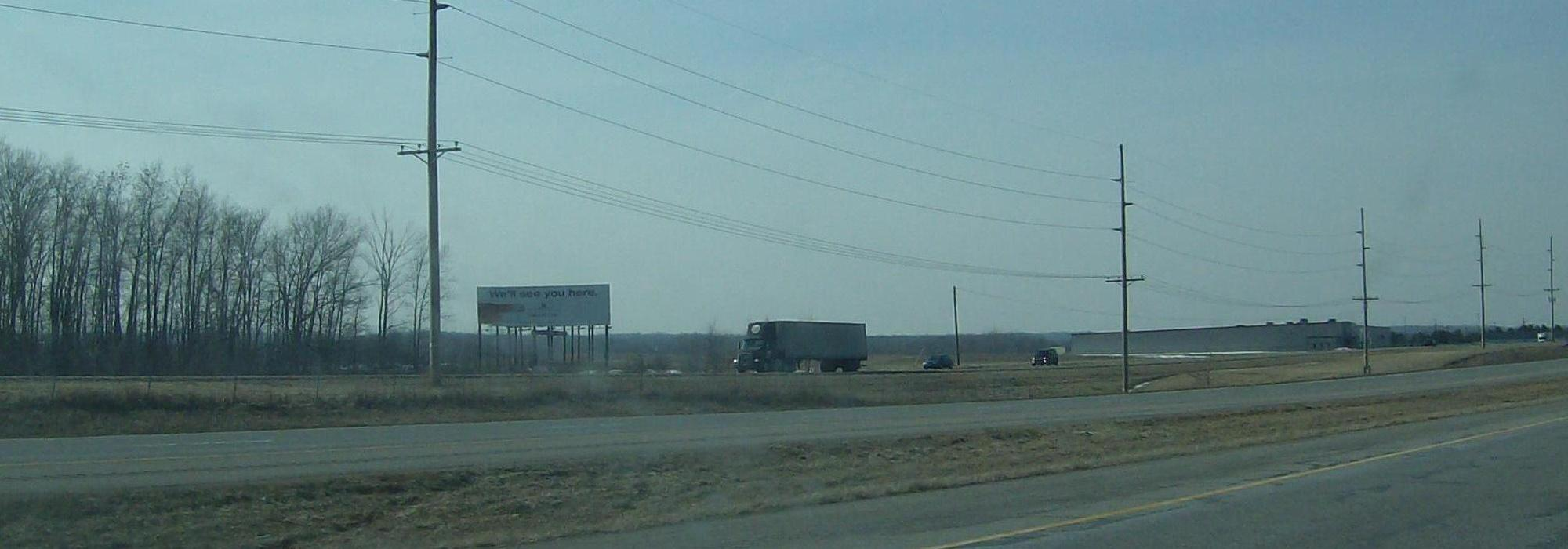
State Route 287 parallels U.S. Route 33 for a few miles, as shown here in Logan County's Zane Township.

SR 287 begins at an intersection where SR 245 leads to the west and the south, County Road 1 leads north and SR 287 leads to the east. At this intersection is one of the Piatt Castles. Also at this point, Macochee Creek runs along the south side of SR 287 for 2000 ft before crossing to the north side and going in the same general direction. SR 287 joins with Township Road 166 for a short segment. SR 287 makes a sharp bend right before an aggressive left-right curve. SR 287 intersects Township Road 169, and then passes its intersection with the start of Township Road 150. Township Road 150, starts and ends on two different points of SR 287, and has no other intersections. SR 287 forms an intersection at the Union Chapel with County Road 41 and County Road 15 in which SR 287 bends back on itself in a turn that's around 60 degrees. This intersection is a three-way-stop with the section of SR 287 coming from the north not stopping. After this intersection, SR 287 is the terminus for Township Road 172, then continues on to intersect again with Township Road 150. SR 287 intersects with SR 559 prior to a sharp bend to the right. SR 287 then intersects with Township Road 151 and County Road 158 prior to the city of Middleburg. In Middleburg, SR 287 crosses County Road 153. SR 287 continues out of Middleburg, passing along the Big Darby Headwaters Nature Preserve to the north. SR 287 intersects SR 347 (formerly CR 144) at its western terminus, encountering a stop sign in the process as it turns to the right and runs alongside US 33. SR 287 joins with Stokes Road at a three-way intersection. SR 287 then continues across US 33 where it ends at the intersection with SR 739.

Along its way, SR 287 passes through the southeastern quadrant of Logan County and the extreme western portion of Union County. No section of this state highway is included within the National Highway System.

== History ==
The designation of SR 287 took place in 1931. When it was initially designated, it was routed along much of its current alignment from its western terminus at SR 245, at the time known as SR 275, to the T-intersection it has with the former two-lane alignment of US 33, now part of SR 347, but originally designated as SR 32.

The highway would remain along this routing entirely within Logan County until 1999, when the freeway portion of US 33 was extended northwest from the Logan–Union County line to Bellefontaine. Consequently, the former two-lane portion of US 33 northwest of SR 287 was removed from the state highway system, and became known as CR 144 (though eventually the segment would return to the state highway system as SR 347). The portion southeast of that point became an extension of SR 287, which now followed the old routing of US 33 to the Stokes Road (CR 153) intersection, then turned northeast and followed Stokes Road a short distance to arrive at its present eastern terminus at the interchange with the US 33 freeway that doubles as the southern terminus of SR 739.

== Major intersections ==
County	Location	mi	km	Destinations	Notes
Logan	Monroe Township	0.00	0.00	SR 245 / CR 1 – Ohio Caverns	
Logan	Zane Township	8.38	13.49	SR 559 south	Northern terminus of SR 559
Logan	Zane Township	11.00	17.70	SR 347 east	Western terminus of SR 347
Union	Allen Township	13.69	22.03	US 33 / SR 739 north – Columbus, Bellefontaine	Interchange; southern terminus of SR 739
1.000 mi = 1.609 km; 1.000 km = 0.621 mi
