= Ohio State Route 507 =

State highway in Champaign County, Ohio, US

State Route 507

Route information
- Maintained by ODOT
- Length: 3.09 mi (4.97 km)
- Existed: 1937–present

Major junctions
- West end: US 68 near West Liberty
- East end: SR 245 near West Liberty

Location
- Country: United States
- State: Ohio
- Counties: Champaign

Highway system
- Ohio State Highway System; Interstate; US; State; Scenic
← SR 506	→ SR 508

State Route 507 (SR 507) is a short east–west state route in western Ohio, located entirely in the northern portion of Champaign County. The western terminus of SR 507 is at U.S. Route 68 (US 68) one mile (1.6 km) south of West Liberty. Its eastern terminus is at SR 245 near the Ohio Caverns approximately four miles (6.4 km) southeast of West Liberty.

== Route description ==
A T-intersection with US 68 in Salem Township located approximately one-half mile (0.80 km) south of the boundary between Champaign and Logan counties, and one mile (1.6 km) south of West Liberty, marks the starting point of SR 507. Heading east from there, this state route jogs northeasterly briefly before continuing easterly through farm country. Passing its intersection with McClain Road, SR 507 turns to the southeast. At Champaign County Road 223, SR 507 bends to the northeast, and continues in that direction through its junction with SR 245 near the Ohio Caverns, where the highway comes to an end. The roadway continuing beyond SR 245 after SR 507 terminates is Mount Tabor Road.

== History ==
SR 507 was first designated in 1937 along the routing that it currently occupies. Little has changed along SR 507 over the years, other than that route that it meets at its eastern terminus was designated as SR 275 when SR 507 first came into being. Later on, SR 275 would be re-designated as SR 245.

== Major intersections ==
The entire route is in Salem Township, Champaign County.

mi	km	Destinations	Notes
0.00	0.00	US 68	
3.09	4.97	SR 245 / Mt. Tabor Road	
1.000 mi = 1.609 km; 1.000 km = 0.621 mi
