= Ohio State Route 559 =

State highway in central Ohio, US

State Route 559

Route information
- Maintained by ODOT
- Length: 16.63 mi (26.76 km)
- Existed: 1937–present

Major junctions
- South end: SR 29 in Mechanicsburg
- US 36 near Woodstock
- North end: SR 287 near North Lewisburg

Location
- Country: United States
- State: Ohio
- Counties: Champaign, Logan

Highway system
- Ohio State Highway System; Interstate; US; State; Scenic
| ← SR 558 | → SR 560 |

State Route 559 (SR 559) is a north–south state highway in the central portion of the U.S. state of Ohio. The southern terminus of the highway is at the signalized junction of State Route 29 and State Route 4 in downtown Mechanicsburg. Its northern terminus is at a T-intersection with State Route 287 approximately 4 miles (6.4 km) northwest of North Lewisburg.

== Route description ==
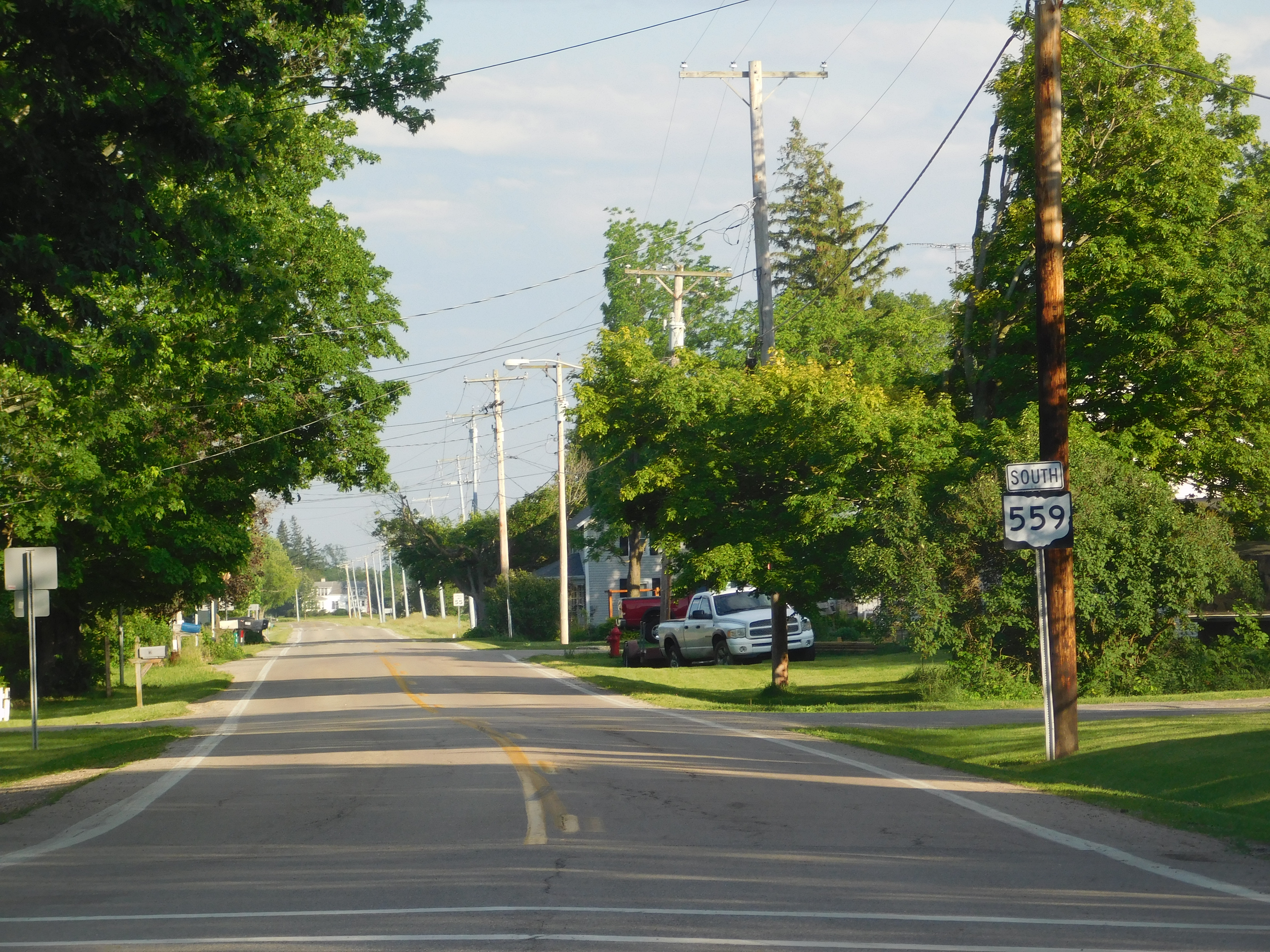
SR 559 in North Lewisburg

State Route 559 runs through the eastern portion of Champaign County and the southeastern quadrant of Logan County. The route connects North Lewisburg to Mechanicsburg and Middleburg. No part of the highway is included within the National Highway System, a network of routes deemed most important for the nation's economy, mobility and defense.

== History ==
Established in 1937, State Route 559 was originally routed along the same alignment that it occupies today through Champaign and Logan Counties. The highway has not experienced any major changes to its routing since its inception.

== Major intersections ==
| County | Location | mi | km | Destinations | Notes |
|---|---|---|---|---|---|
| Champaign | Mechanicsburg | 0.00 | 0.00 | SR 4 (Sandusky Street) / SR 29 east (South Main Street) | Southern end of SR 29 concurrency |
| Champaign | Mechanicsburg | 0.27 | 0.43 | SR 29 west (West Main Street) | Northern end of SR 29 concurrency |
| Champaign | Goshen Township | 2.44 | 3.93 | SR 161 – Irwin, Mutual | |
| Champaign | Rush Township | 5.42 | 8.72 | US 36 – Urbana, Marysville | |
| Champaign | North Lewisburg | 11.80 | 18.99 | SR 245 east (Maple Street) / East Street | Southern end of SR 245 concurrency |
| Champaign | North Lewisburg | 12.01 | 19.33 | SR 245 west (Maple Street) / South Sycamore Street | Northern end of SR 245 concurrency |
| Logan | Zane Township | 16.63 | 26.76 | SR 287 | |
1.000 mi = 1.609 km; 1.000 km = 0.621 mi: Concurrency terminus
