= Ohio State Route 245 =

State highway in western Ohio, US

State Route 245

Route information
- Maintained by ODOT
- Length: 36.03 mi (57.98 km)
- Existed: 1962–present

Major junctions
- West end: SR 29 near Rosewood
- US 68 in West Liberty
- East end: US 33 / US 36 / SR 4 in Marysville

Location
- Country: United States
- State: Ohio
- Counties: Champaign, Logan, Union

Highway system
- Ohio State Highway System; Interstate; US; State; Scenic
← SR 244	→ SR 246
← I-275	→ SR 276

State Route 245 (SR 245) is an east–west state highway in the western portion of the U.S. state of Ohio. The western terminus of SR 245 is at an intersection with SR 29 near Rosewood. Its eastern terminus is at an exit ramp with U.S. Route 33 (US 33), US 36, and SR 4 in Marysville.

== Route description ==
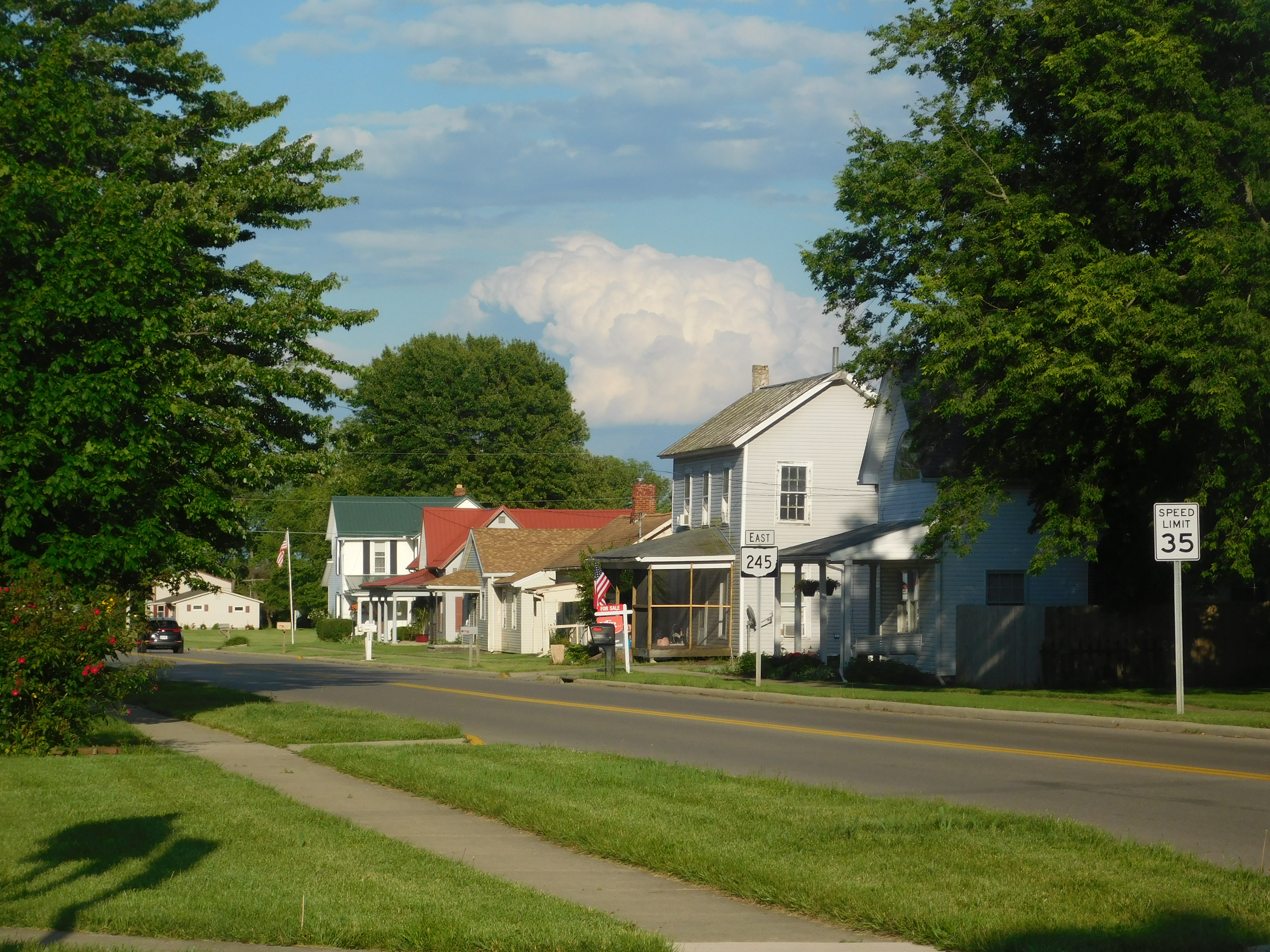
SR 245 in North Lewisburg

SR 245 travels through the northern portion of Champaign County, the southern portion of Logan County and then re-enters Champaign County; the highway also travels through the western part of Union County. No segment of this highway is a part of the National Highway System.

== History ==
SR 245 was first designated in 1962. The original routing of the highway consisted of the same route as today. Prior to June 1963, SR 245 was signed as SR 275. The route was renumbered at that time due to Ohio renumbering state highways sharing the same number as Interstate highways; Interstate 275 forced the renumbering of SR 275.

== Major intersections ==
County	Location	mi	km	Destinations	Notes
Champaign	Adams Township	0.00	0.00	SR 29 / Ford Road	
Logan	West Liberty	12.48	20.08	US 68 (Detroit Street)	
Logan	Monroe Township	14.69	23.64	SR 287 east / CR 1 – Middleburg	Western terminus of SR 287
Champaign	No major junctions				
Logan	No major junctions				
Champaign	Salem Township	17.29	27.83	SR 507 west / CR 108 (Mt. Tabor Road)	Eastern terminus of SR 507
Champaign	Wayne Township	22.93	36.90	SR 296 west / CR 130 (Brush Lake Road)	Eastern terminus of SR 296
Champaign	North Lewisburg	26.92	43.32	SR 559 north (North Sycamore Street)	Western end of SR 559 concurrency
Champaign	North Lewisburg	27.17	43.73	SR 559 south (Audas Street) / East Street	Eastern end of SR 559 concurrency
Union	Paris Township	34.95– 35.08	56.25– 56.46	US 33 west – Bellefontaine	Partial interchange; access to US 33 westbound and from US 33 eastbound only
Union	Paris Township–Marysville line	35.68– 36.03	57.42– 57.98	US 33 east / US 36 / SR 4 / Northwest Parkway – Springfield, Columbus	Interchange
1.000 mi = 1.609 km; 1.000 km = 0.621 mi: Concurrency terminus; Incomplete access
