= The Fort (North Lewisburg, Ohio) =

Historic house in Ohio, United States

- U.S. National Register of Historic Places
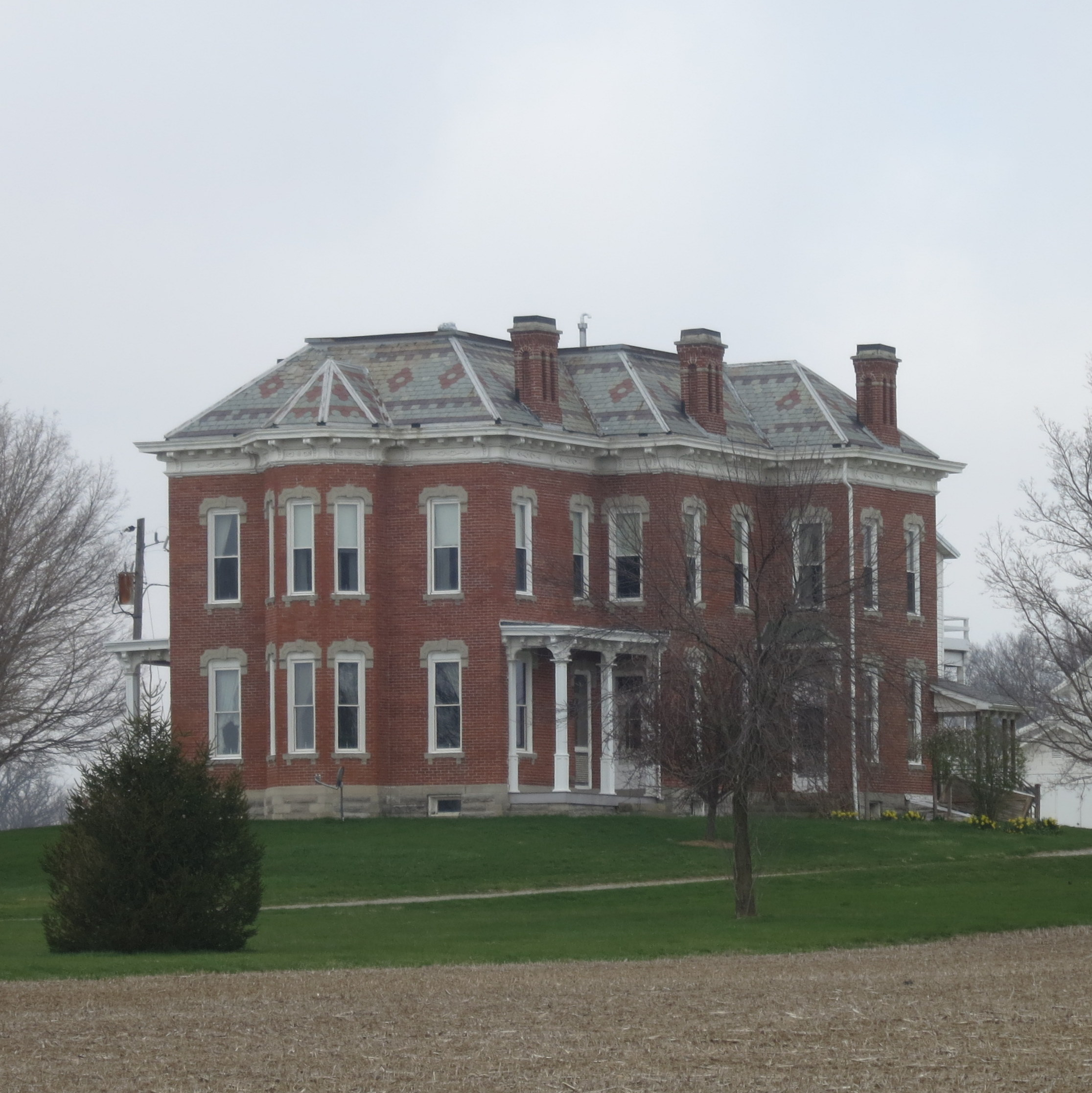
- The Fort as seen from N. Lewisburg Road

- Location within Ohio Location within the United States
- Location: 26953 N. Lewisburg Rd., North Lewisburg, Ohio
- Coordinates: 40°13′55″N 83°33′1″W
- Area: 3 acres (1.2 ha)
- Built: 1877
- Architectural style: Italianate
- NRHP reference No.: 82003662
- Added to NRHP: July 8, 1982

The Fort is a prominent historic house in the central portion of the U.S. state of Ohio. Located northeast of the village of North Lewisburg in Union County, this two-story brick building is a local landmark. Built in 1877, it is a square structure, measuring five bays wide on each of its sides. Its foundation is built of ashlar stone, while the hip roof is constructed of imbricated slates of multiple colors. The house's hilltop location makes it visible from a vast distance in all directions. Many of its impressive Italianate architectural elements, such as the ornamental cornice and carven stone lintels, can be distinguished from far away, especially as the house is surrounded by farmland rather than woods. Porches are located on both sides of the house's front of the house, with a two-story bay window placed in the middle of the facade. Chimneys stand at the tops of both side walls.

In 1982, The Fort was listed on the National Register of Historic Places due to its well-preserved historic architecture, for it has been rated as one of the best Italianate buildings in rural Union County. It also qualified for its place in local history, for it was home to horse breeder Shepard Clark. The son of one of the earliest settlers in Allen Township, Clark was regarded highly throughout Ohio for his breeding operation.
