= Ohio State Route 275 =

State Route 275

Route information
- Maintained by ODOT

Location
- Country: United States
- State: Ohio

Highway system
- Ohio State Highway System; Interstate; US; State; Scenic
← SR 274	→ SR 276

In Ohio, State Route 275 may refer to:

- Interstate 275 in Ohio, the only Ohio highway numbered 275 since about 1962
- Ohio State Route 275 (1930s-1960s), now SR 245
