= Pickrelltown, Ohio =

- Unincorporated community
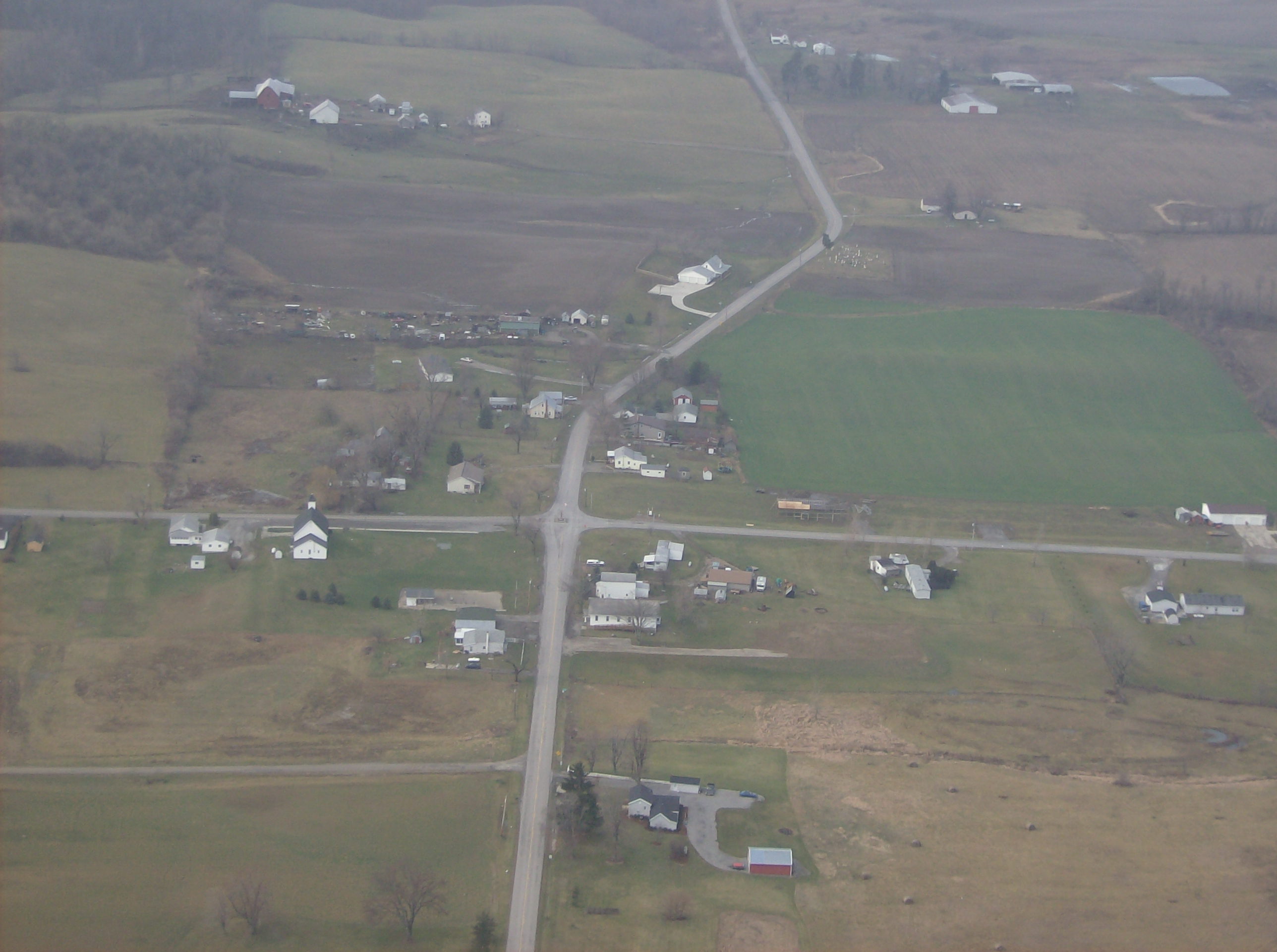
- Aerial view of Pickrelltown from the east

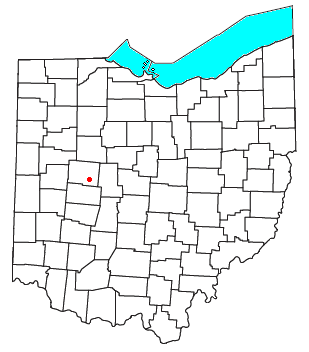
- Location of Pickrelltown, Ohio
- Coordinates: 40°17′59″N 83°39′37″W
- Country: United States
- State: Ohio
- County: Logan
- Township: Monroe
- Elevation: 1,414 ft (431 m)
- Time zone: UTC-5 (Eastern (EST))
  - Summer (DST): UTC-4 (EDT)
- GNIS feature ID: 1061538

Pickrelltown is an unincorporated community in Logan County, Ohio.

The settlement is located at the intersection of County Roads 28 and 29 in northern Monroe Township.

Variant names of Pickrelltown include "Frogtown", "Pickereltown", "Pickeretown", and "Pickreltown".

== History ==
A post office was established at Pickrelltown in 1851, and remained in operation until 1903. The community was named for Henry Pickerel, the proprietor of a local tanyard.

== Geography ==
Pickrelltown is a short distance south of Mad River Mountain Ski Resort and southeast of Bellefontaine. The headwaters of the Macochee Creek, a small stream that meets the Mad River at West Liberty, are located around Pickrelltown.

Pigeon Town, a town of the Shawnee Mekoche division, was located on Mad River, 3 miles northwest of West Liberty, Logan County, Ohio.

== Notable people ==
- Solomon L. Hoge — South Carolina Supreme Court justice and U.S. representative from South Carolina

== Gallery ==
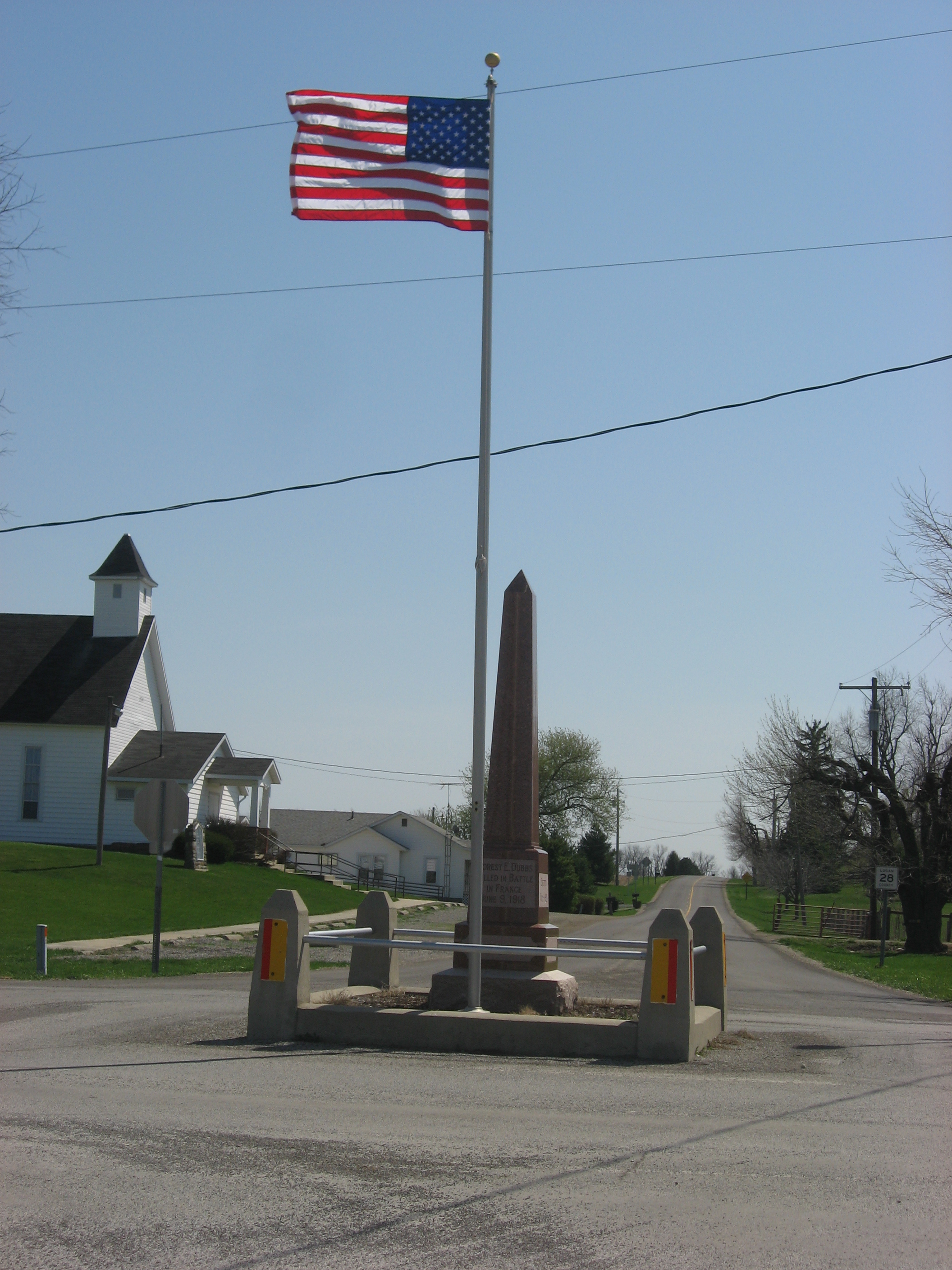
World War I veterans memorial in Pickrelltown (2010 photo). The 8 ft (2.4 m) high granite monument was erected in 1921, and has twice been rebuilt after vehicles crashed into it.

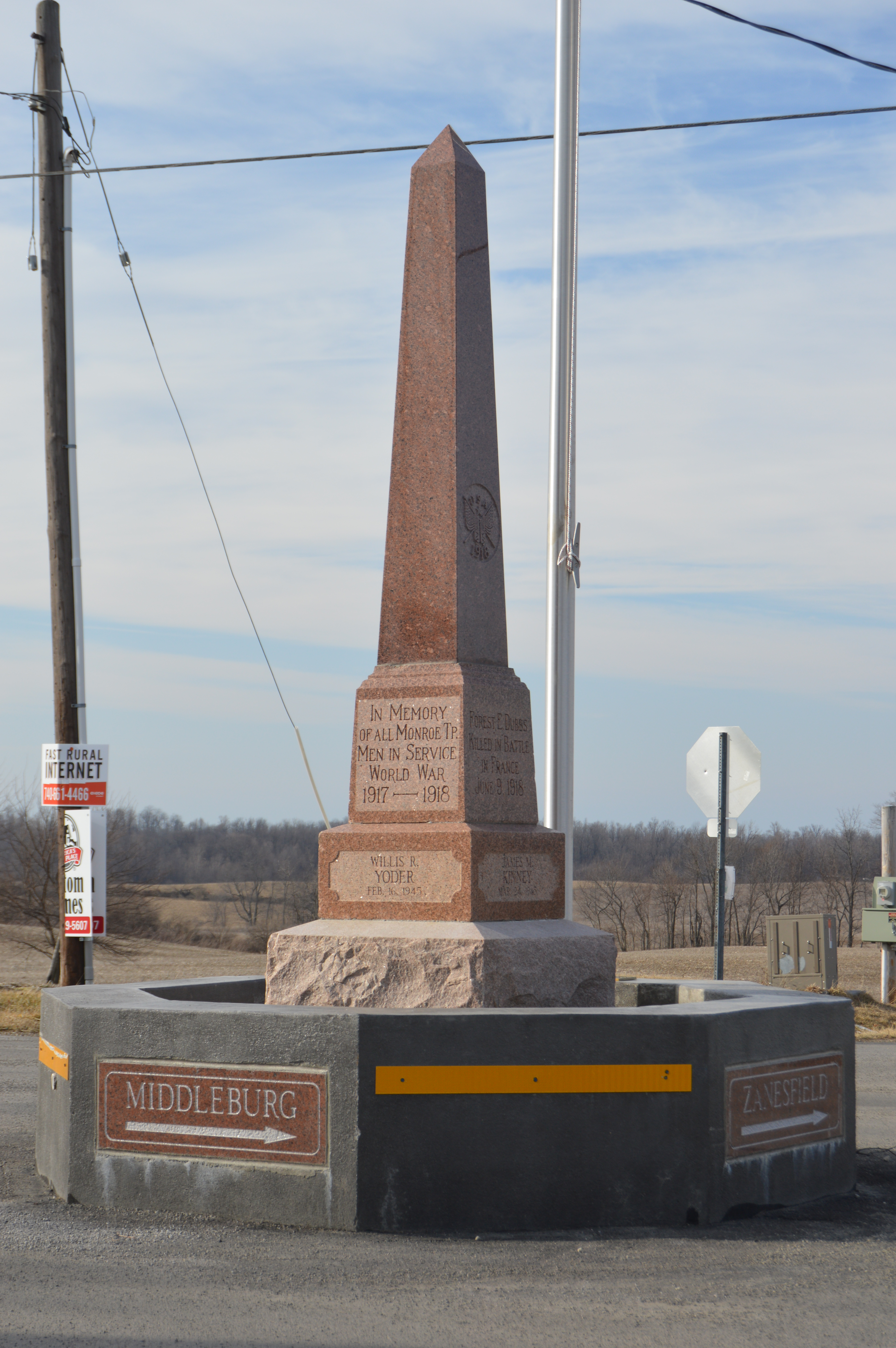
Rebuilt veterans memorial following its destruction in 2014.
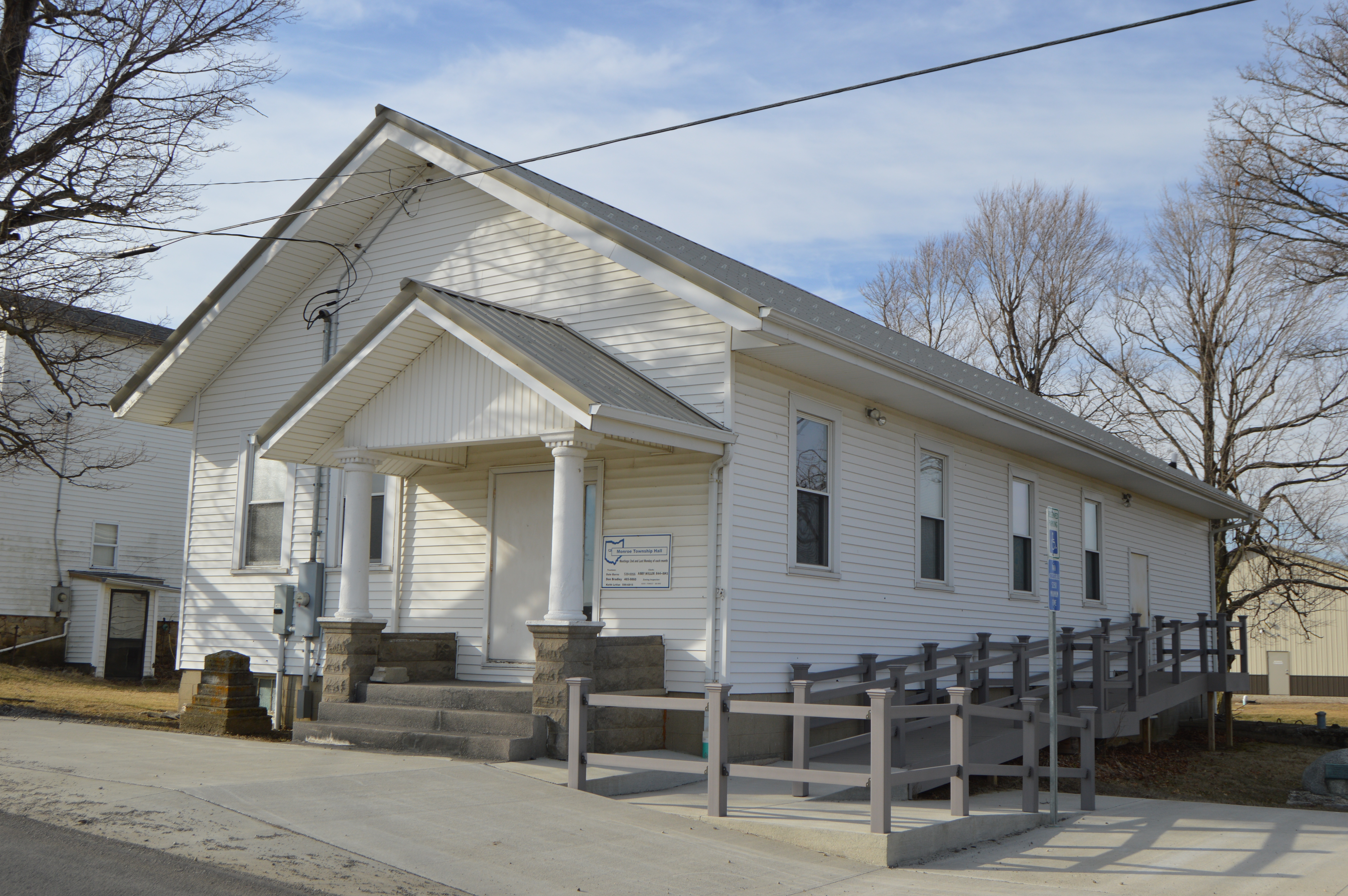
Monroe Township hall at Pickrelltown.

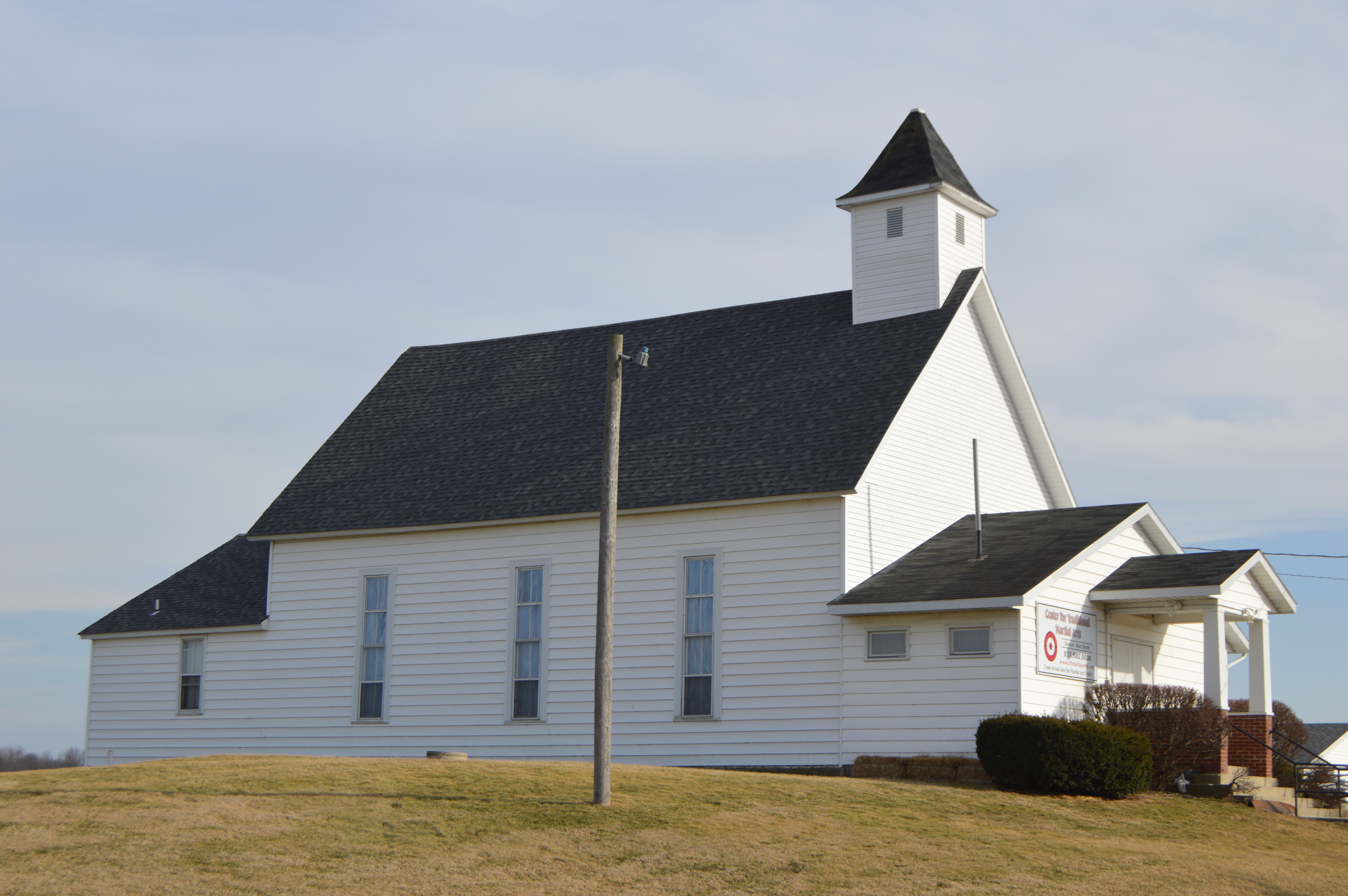
Monroe Community Church at Pickrelltown.
