= Crystal Sea =

Crystal Sea may refer to: The “Crystal Sea”, as mentioned in many songs and literary works. As such, it is derived from the Biblical references of it as the “floor of Heaven”, “the Sea of Glass, or “the firmament”. It is also referred to as the “vault of heaven”, the dome (or “iron dome”) of the earth, or “earth’s ceiling”. Biblical references to the Crystal Sea include: Revelation 4:6, Revelation 15:2, Ezekiel 1:22-26, Genesis 1:6-15, Psalm 148:4, Job 22:14, Job 37:18, Amos 9:5-6, and Exodus 24:10

- Crystal Sea (rig), a Norwegian-Bermudan offshore drilling rig
- Ohio Caverns § The Crystal Sea and Natural Bridge, a water-retention pool
