= Monroe Township, Logan County, Ohio =

Township in Ohio, US

- Township
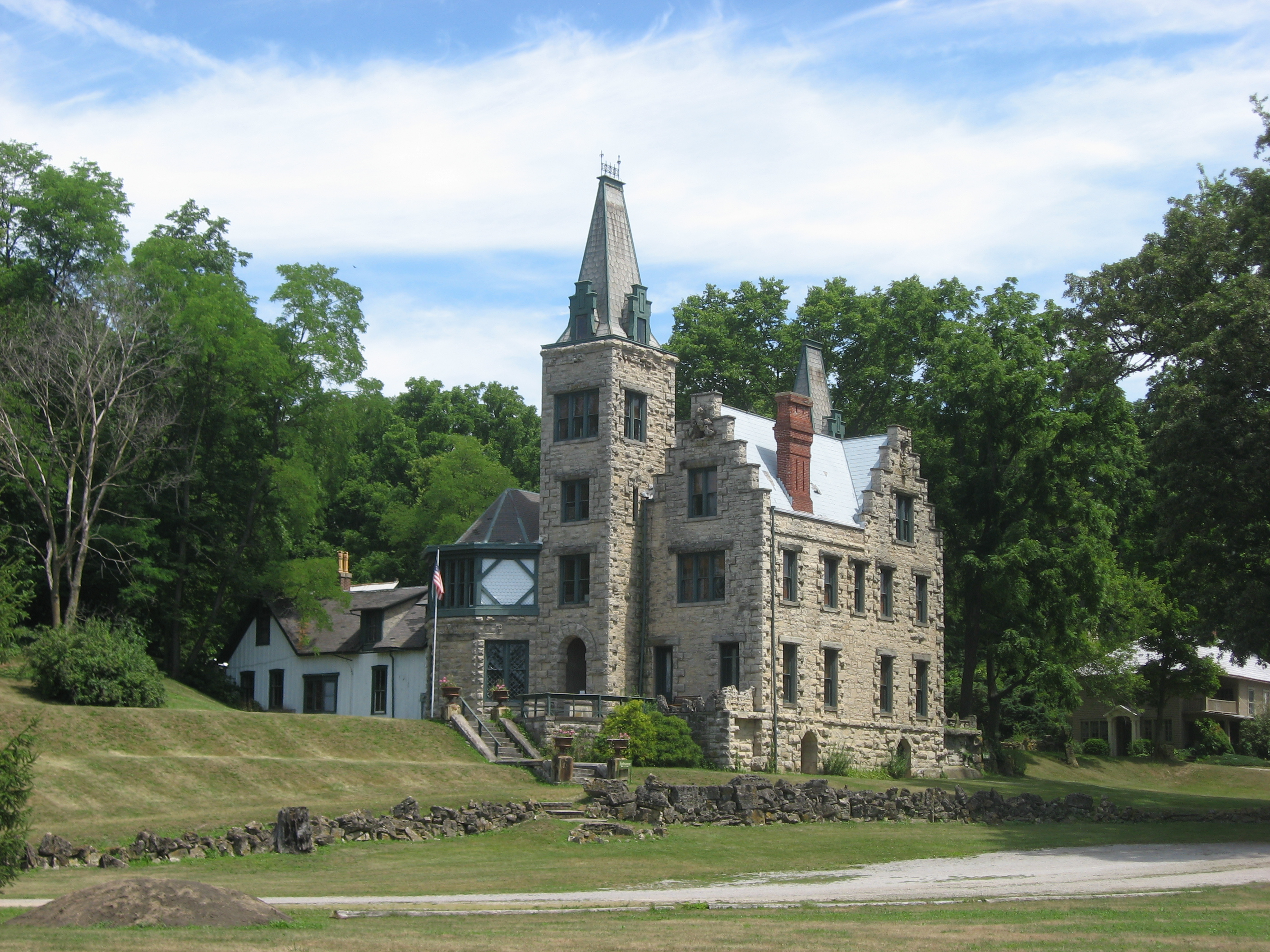
- Mac-O-Chee Castle, a historic site in the township

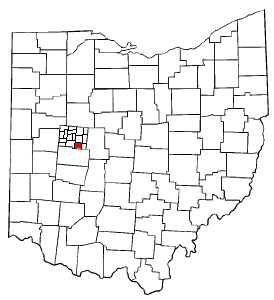
- Location of Monroe Township in Ohio

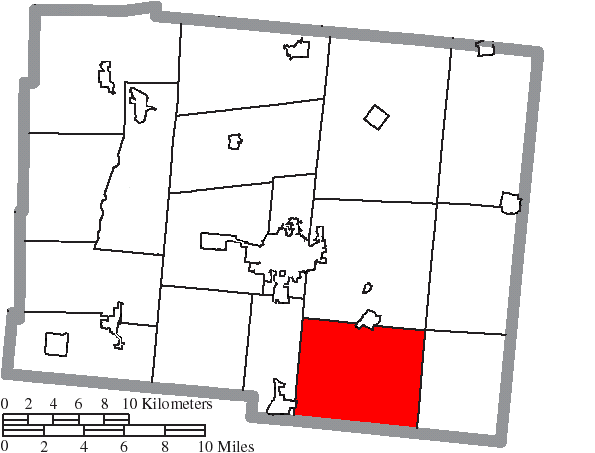
- Location of Monroe Township in Logan County
- Coordinates: 40°16′40″N 83°41′36″W
- Country: United States
- State: Ohio
- County: Logan

Area
  - Total: 31.28 sq mi (81.02 km^{2})
  - Land: 31.27 sq mi (81.00 km^{2})
  - Water: 0.0077 sq mi (0.02 km^{2})
- Elevation: 1,371 ft (418 m)

Population (2020)
  - Total: 1,800
  - Density: 58/sq mi (22/km^{2})
- Time zone: UTC-5 (Eastern (EST))
  - Summer (DST): UTC-4 (EDT)
- Area codes: 937, 326
- FIPS code: 39-51464
- GNIS feature ID: 1086489

Monroe Township is one of the seventeen townships of Logan County, Ohio, United States. As of the 2020 census, the population was 1,800.

== Geography ==
Located in the southeastern part of the county, it borders the following townships:

- Jefferson Township – north
- Perry Township – northeast corner
- Zane Township – east
- Wayne Township, Champaign County – southeast
- Salem Township, Champaign County – south
- Liberty Township – west

Parts of the villages of West Liberty and Valley Hi are located in southwestern and northern Monroe Township respectively, and the unincorporated community of Pickrelltown lies in the township's north.

== Name and history ==
Monroe Township was organized in 1822. It is one of twenty-two Monroe Townships statewide.

== Government ==
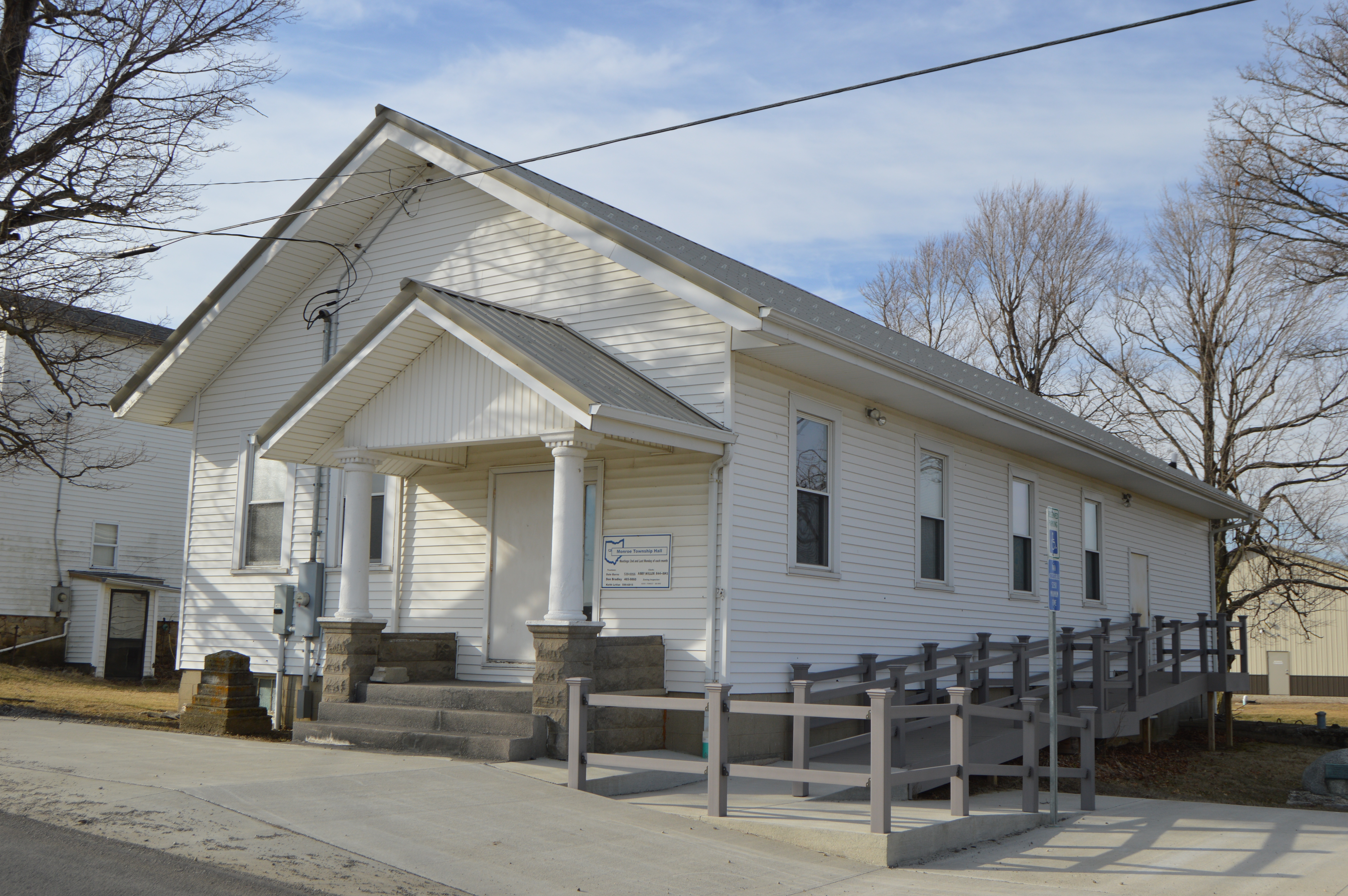
Monroe Township Hall in Pickrelltown

The township is governed by a three-member board of trustees, who are elected in November of odd-numbered years to a four-year term beginning on the following January 1. Two are elected in the year after the presidential election and one is elected in the year before it. There is also an elected township fiscal officer, who serves a four-year term beginning on April 1 of the year after the election, which is held in November of the year before the presidential election. Vacancies in the fiscal officership or on the board of trustees are filled by the remaining trustees.

== Transportation ==
Important highways in Monroe Township include State Routes 245 and 287.
