= Ohio State Route 508 =

State highway in Logan County, Ohio, US

State Route 508

Route information
- Maintained by ODOT
- Length: 9.46 mi (15.22 km)
- Existed: 1937–present

Major junctions
- West end: SR 235 in DeGraff
- East end: US 68 in West Liberty

Location
- Country: United States
- State: Ohio
- Counties: Logan

Highway system
- Ohio State Highway System; Interstate; US; State; Scenic
| ← SR 507 | → SR 509 |

State Route 508 (SR 508) is a two-lane east-west state highway in the western portion of Ohio, a U.S. state. The western terminus of State Route 508 is at a signalized intersection with State Route 235 in the village of De Graff. The route's eastern terminus is at a T-intersection with U.S. Route 68 in West Liberty.

== Route description ==
The entirety of State Route 508 is located within Logan County. This highway is not incorporated within the National Highway System, a network of highways that are vital to the economy, defense and mobility of the country.

State Route 508 passes through rural Logan County, connecting the village of De Graff in the west to West Liberty in the east. The route travels through largely agricultural land, passing through Liberty Township along its 9.46-mile length.

== History ==
First appearing in 1937, State Route 508 occupies the same exact De Graff-to-West Liberty routing today that it did when it was assigned. No changes have taken place to the routing of State Route 508, other than the fact that the route that it meets at its western terminus was originally State Route 69. This intersecting route has since been re-designated as State Route 235.

== Major intersections ==
The entire route is in Logan County.

| Location | mi | km | Destinations | Notes |
|---|---|---|---|---|
| De Graff | 0.00 | 0.00 | SR 235 (Miami Street) / Main Street | |
| West Liberty | 9.46 | 15.22 | US 68 | |
1.000 mi = 1.609 km; 1.000 km = 0.621 mi
