= Zane Township, Logan County, Ohio =

Township in Ohio, US

- Township
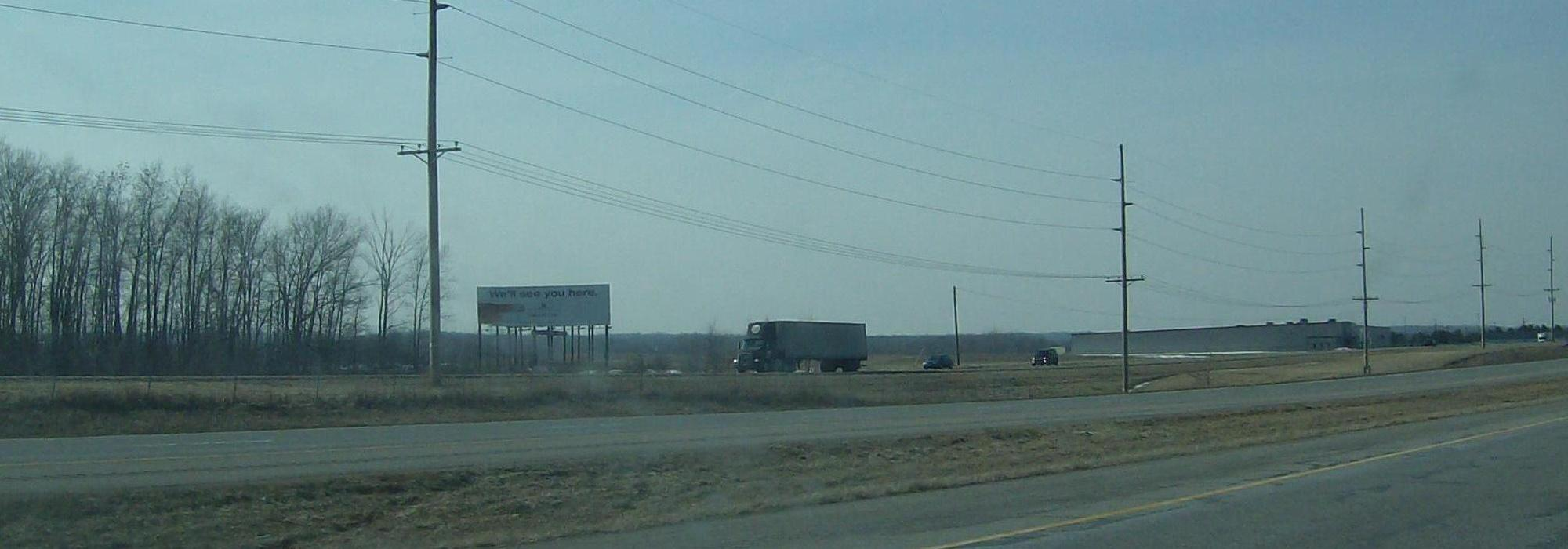
- Along U.S. Route 33 and State Route 287 in Zane Township, near several Honda plants

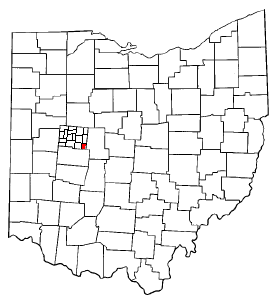
- Location of Zane Township in Ohio

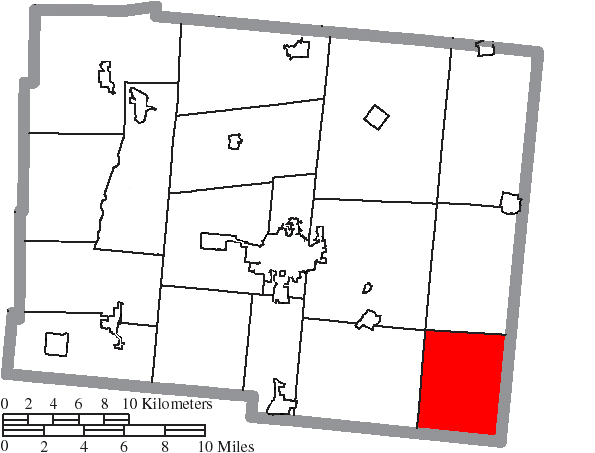
- Location of Zane Township in Logan County
- Coordinates: 40°16′38″N 83°34′12″W
- Country: United States
- State: Ohio
- County: Logan

Area
  - Total: 57.0 sq mi (148 km^{2})
  - Land: 57.0 sq mi (148 km^{2})
  - Water: 0.0 sq mi (0 km^{2})
- Elevation: 1,148 ft (350 m)

Population (2020)
  - Total: 1,191
  - Density: 20.9/sq mi (8.07/km^{2})
- Time zone: UTC-5 (Eastern (EST))
  - Summer (DST): UTC-4 (EDT)
- Area codes: 937, 326
- FIPS code: 39-88042
- GNIS feature ID: 1086497
- Website: www.zanetownship.org

Zane Township is one of the seventeen townships of Logan County, Ohio, United States. As of the 2020 census, the population was 1,191.

== Geography ==
Located in the southeastern corner of the county, it borders the following townships:

- Perry Township - north
- Liberty Township, Union County - northeast
- Allen Township, Union County - east
- Rush Township, Champaign County - southeast
- Wayne Township, Champaign County - southwest
- Monroe Township - west
- Jefferson Township - northwest corner

No municipalities are located in Zane Township, although the unincorporated community of Middleburg lies in the township's northwest.

== Name and history ==
Zane Township was organized in 1818, and was named for Isaac Zane, a pioneer settler. It is the only Zane Township statewide.

== Government ==
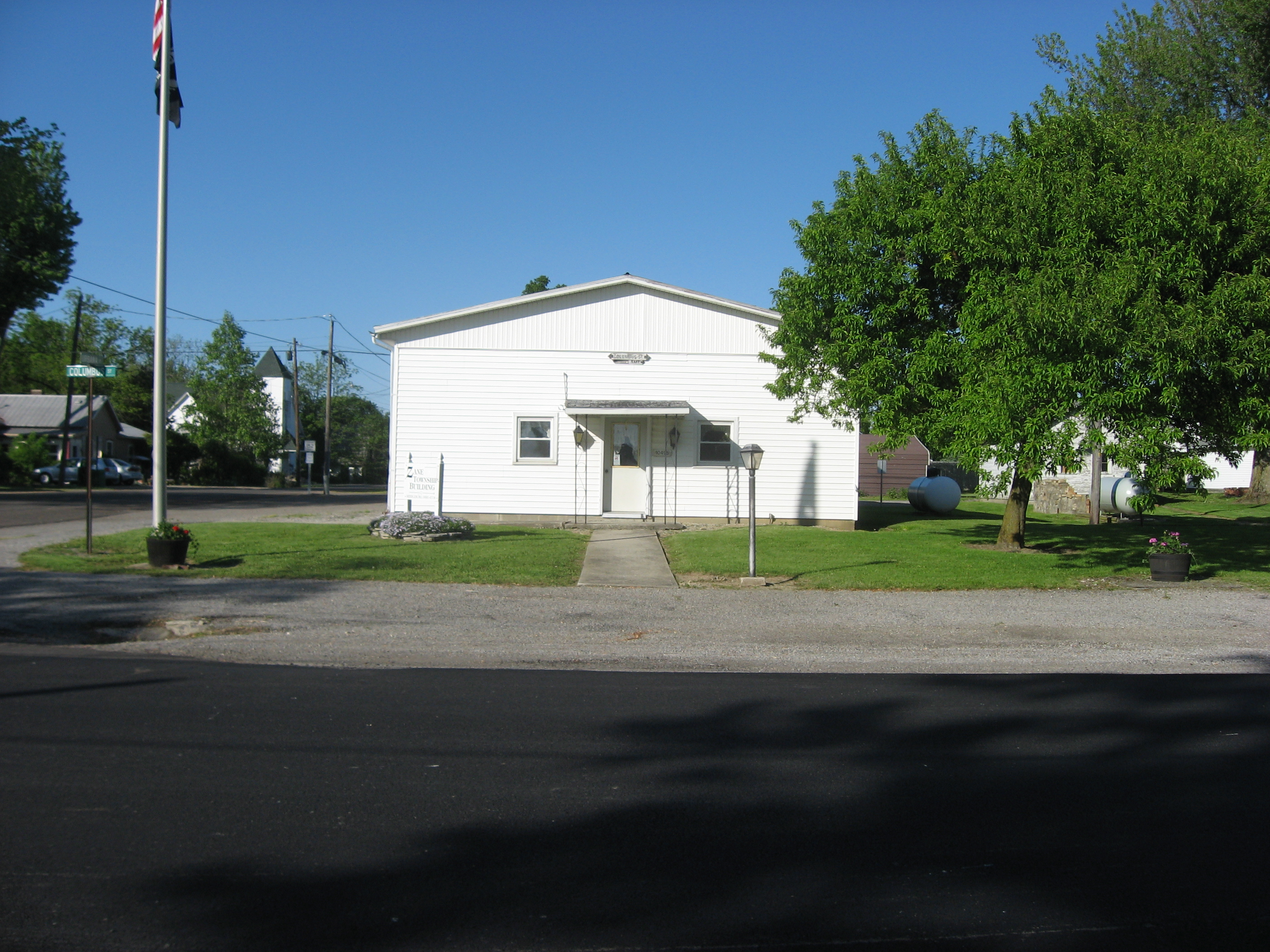
Zane Township hall

The township is governed by a three-member board of trustees, who are elected in November of odd-numbered years to a four-year term beginning on the following January 1. Two are elected in the year after the presidential election and one is elected in the year before it. There is also an elected township fiscal officer, who serves a four-year term beginning on April 1 of the year after the election, which is held in November of the year before the presidential election. Vacancies in the fiscal officership or on the board of trustees are filled by the remaining trustees.

== Transportation ==
Important highways in Zane Township include U.S. Route 33 and State Routes 287 and 559.
