= Cable, Ohio =

Unincorporated community in Ohio, U.S.

Coordinates: 40°10′13″N 83°37′42″W

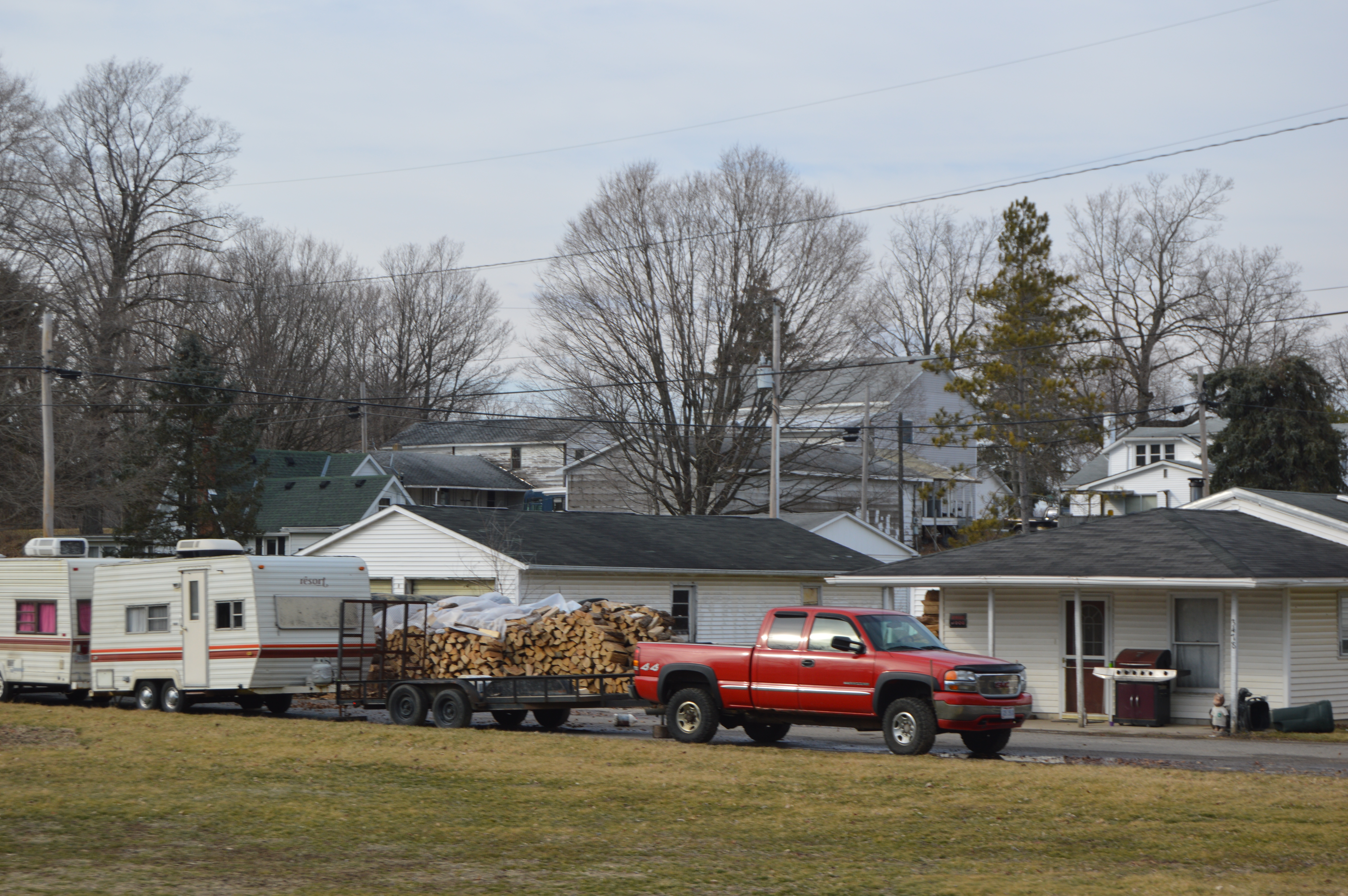
Houses in southeastern Cable

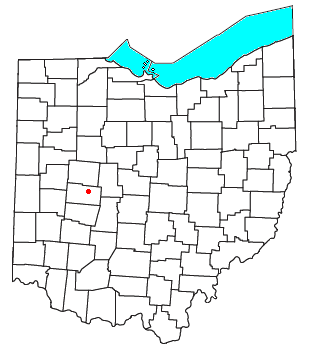
Location of Cable, Ohio

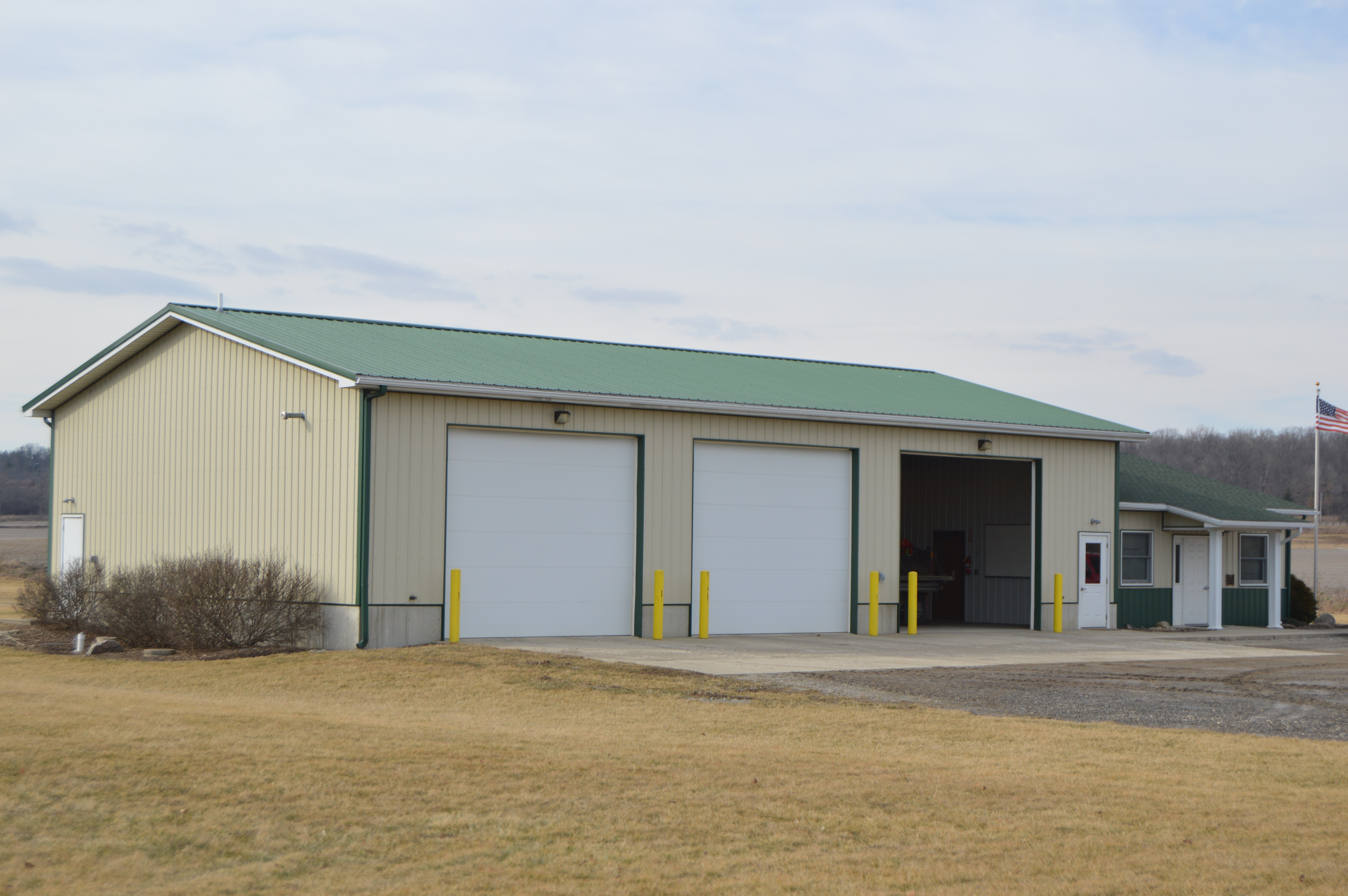
Wayne Township hall in Cable

Cable is an unincorporated community in central Wayne Township, Champaign County, Ohio, United States. It has a post office with the ZIP code 43009.

Cable was platted in 1852 by Philander L. Cable, and named for him. The railroad was built through town in 1854. A post office called Cable has been in operation since 1868.
