= Allen Township, Union County, Ohio =

Township in Ohio, US

- Township
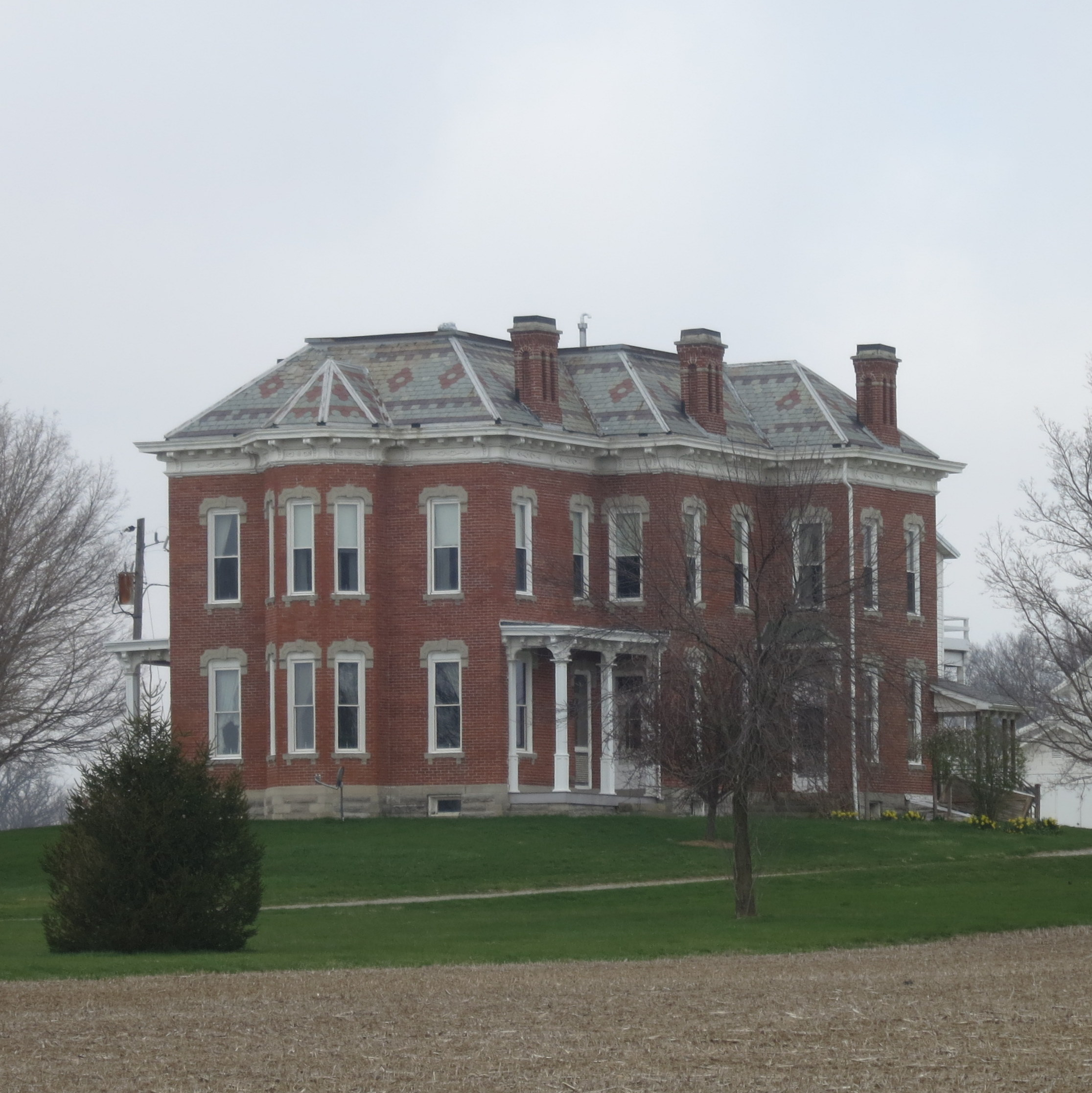
- The Fort outside North Lewisburg

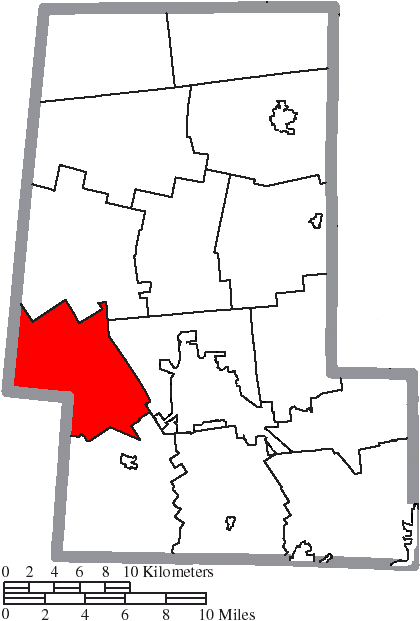
- Location of Allen Township in Union County
- Coordinates: 40°14′59″N 83°29′24″W
- Country: United States
- State: Ohio
- County: Union

Area
  - Total: 30.1 sq mi (78.0 km^{2})
  - Land: 30.1 sq mi (77.9 km^{2})
  - Water: 0.039 sq mi (0.1 km^{2})
- Elevation: 1,027 ft (313 m)

Population (2020)
  - Total: 2,365
  - Density: 79/sq mi (30.4/km^{2})
- Time zone: UTC-5 (Eastern (EST))
  - Summer (DST): UTC-4 (EDT)
- FIPS code: 39-01336
- GNIS feature ID: 1087073
- Website: Allen Township

Allen Township is one of the fourteen townships of Union County, Ohio, United States. The 2020 census found 2,365 people in the township.

== History ==
Statewide, other Allen Townships are located in Darke, Hancock, and Ottawa Counties.

Allen Township was organized on June 5, 1827. The town was named for Daniel Allen, one of the first settlers to the area. Allen was one of the first thirteen citizens to vote in the township, and was one of the first trustees.

One of the township's first settlers was Angus Clark; his son Shepard became a leading farmer in the township, and the Clark family property is today a local landmark known as "The Fort".

== Geography ==
Located in the western part of the county, it borders the following townships:

- Liberty Township - north
- Paris Township - east
- Union Township - southeast
- Rush Township, Champaign County - southwest
- Zane Township, Logan County - west

No municipalities are located in Allen Township.

== Government ==
The township is governed by a three-member board of trustees, who are elected in November of odd-numbered years to a four-year term beginning on the following January 1. Two are elected in the year after the presidential election and one is elected in the year before it. There is also an elected township fiscal officer, who serves a four-year term beginning on April 1 of the year after the election, which is held in November of the year before the presidential election. Vacancies in the fiscal officership or on the board of trustees are filled by the remaining trustees.
