= Woodstock, Ohio =

- Village
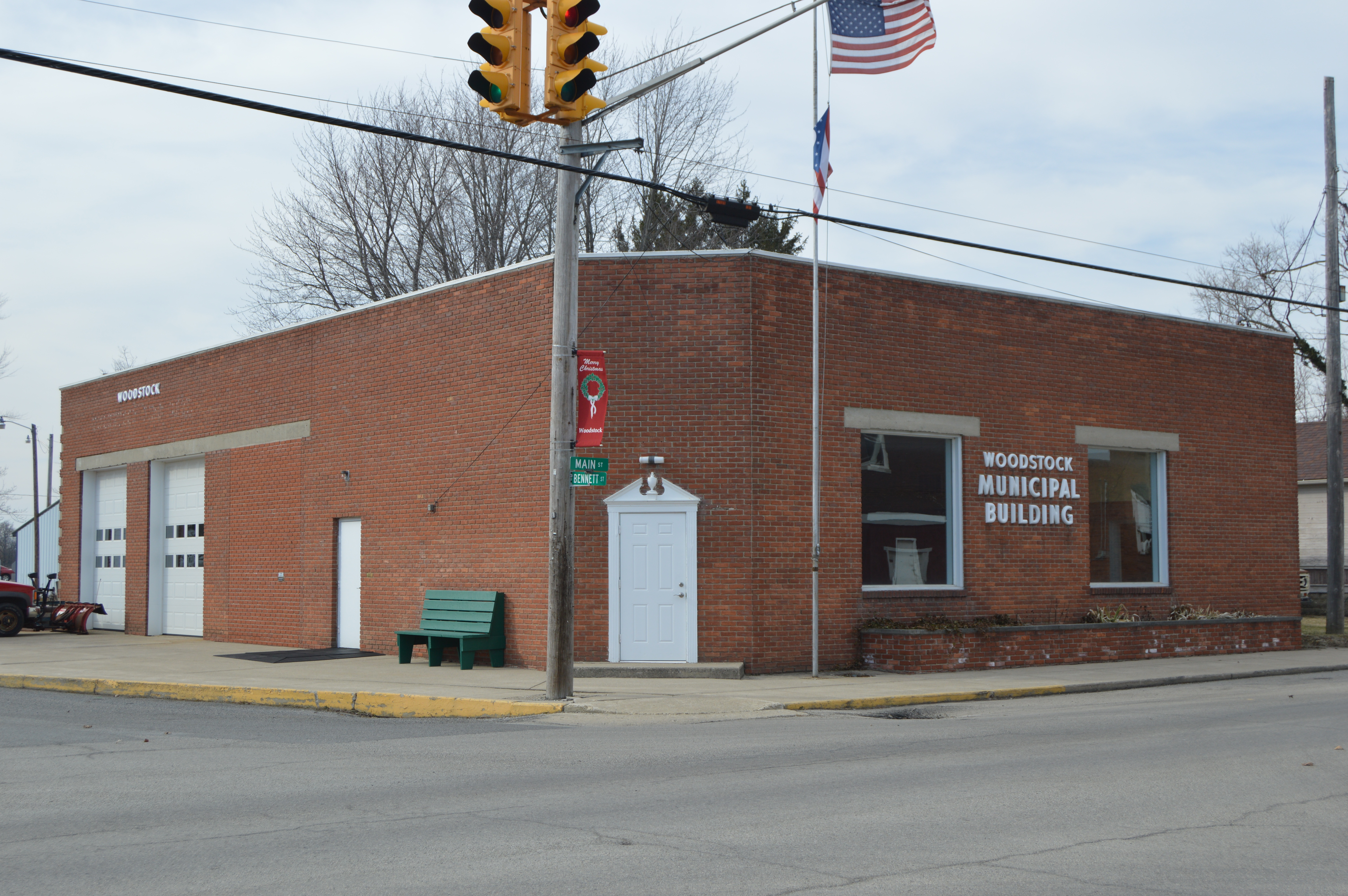
- Village Hall

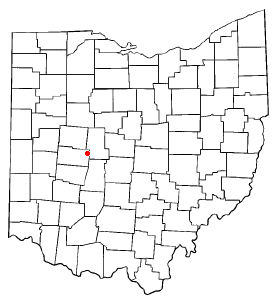
- Location of Woodstock, Ohio

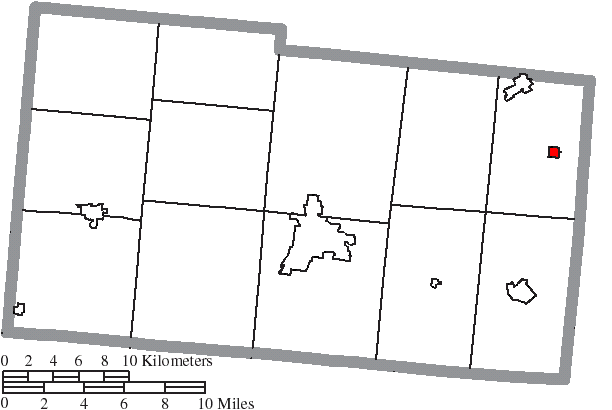
- Location of Woodstock in Champaign County
- Coordinates: 40°10′25″N 83°31′41″W
- Country: United States
- State: Ohio
- County: Champaign
- Township: Rush

Government
  - Mayor: Phil
  - Council Woman: Rochelle

Area
  - Total: 0.28 sq mi (0.73 km^{2})
  - Land: 0.28 sq mi (0.73 km^{2})
  - Water: 0 sq mi (0.00 km^{2})
- Elevation: 1,047 ft (319 m)

Population (2020)
  - Total: 287
  - Density: 1,015.9/sq mi (392.23/km^{2})
- Time zone: UTC-5 (Eastern (EST))
  - Summer (DST): UTC-4 (EDT)
- ZIP code: 43084
- Area codes: 937, 326
- FIPS code: 39-86478
- GNIS feature ID: 2399738

Woodstock is a village in Champaign County, Ohio, United States. The population was 287 at the 2020 census.

== History ==
Woodstock was platted in 1834.

Two members of the village were directly involved in the January 6 United States Capitol attack.

== Geography ==
Woodstock is located on State Route 559 about 12 miles (19 km) north of Mechanicsburg, Ohio.

According to the United States Census Bureau, the village has a total area of 0.29 square miles (0.75 km^{2}), all of it land.

== Demographics ==
Historical population
| Census | Pop. | Note | %± |
|---|---|---|---|
| 1880 | 383 | | — |
| 1890 | 301 | | −21.4% |
| 1900 | 325 | | 8.0% |
| 1910 | 310 | | −4.6% |
| 1920 | 326 | | 5.2% |
| 1930 | 293 | | −10.1% |
| 1940 | 263 | | −10.2% |
| 1950 | 316 | | 20.2% |
| 1960 | 310 | | −1.9% |
| 1970 | 281 | | −9.4% |
| 1980 | 292 | | 3.9% |
| 1990 | 296 | | 1.4% |
| 2000 | 317 | | 7.1% |
| 2010 | 305 | | −3.8% |
| 2020 | 287 | | −5.9% |
U.S. Decennial Census

=== 2010 census ===
As of the census of 2010, there were 305 people, 103 households, and 82 families living in the village. The population density was 1,051.7 inhabitants per square mile (406.1/km^{2}). There were 113 housing units at an average density of 389.7 per square mile (150.5/km^{2}). The racial makeup of the village was 98.4% White, 1.0% Native American, 0.3% from other races, and 0.3% from two or more races. Hispanic or Latino of any race were 0.7% of the population.

There were 103 households, of which 42.7% had children under the age of 18 living with them, 59.2% were married couples living together, 13.6% had a female householder with no husband present, 6.8% had a male householder with no wife present, and 20.4% were non-families. 17.5% of all households were made up of individuals, and 5.9% had someone living alone who was 65 years of age or older. The average household size was 2.96 and the average family size was 3.35.

The median age in the village was 33.2 years. 33.4% of residents were under the age of 18; 5.7% were between the ages of 18 and 24; 29.1% were from 25 to 44; 23.9% were from 45 to 64; and 7.9% were 65 years of age or older. The gender makeup of the village was 52.8% male and 47.2% female.

=== 2000 census ===
As of the census of 2000, there were 317 people, 101 households, and 85 families living in the village. The population density was 1,167.0 inhabitants per square mile (450.6/km^{2}). There were 105 housing units at an average density of 386.6 per square mile (149.3/km^{2}). The racial makeup of the village was 98.11% White, 1.58% Native American, and 0.32% from two or more races.

There were 101 households, out of which 42.6% had children under the age of 18 living with them, 72.3% were married couples living together, 8.9% had a female householder with no husband present, and 15.8% were non-families. 14.9% of all households were made up of individuals, and 6.9% had someone living alone who was 65 years of age or older. The average household size was 3.14 and the average family size was 3.38.

In the village, the population was spread out, with 34.1% under the age of 18, 10.1% from 18 to 24, 30.0% from 25 to 44, 17.0% from 45 to 64, and 8.8% who were 65 years of age or older. The median age was 29 years. For every 100 females there were 87.6 males. For every 100 females age 18 and over, there were 91.7 males.

The median income for a household in the village was $44,750, and the median income for a family was $43,750. Males had a median income of $35,250 versus $25,938 for females. The per capita income for the village was $24,633. About 11.5% of families and 10.9% of the population were below the poverty line, including 19.2% of those under age 18 and none of those age 65 or over.

== Climate ==
Woodstock

Climate chart (precipitation, max. and min. temperature)
| J | F | M | A | M | J | J | A | S | O | N | D |
| 86 −2 −9 | 70 1 −9 | 83 12 −3 | 132 22 4 | 88 26 11 | 134 27 15 | 146 26 17 | 83 25 15 | 100 24 12 | 116 20 8 | 59 12 −2 | 111 2 −6 |
- █ Average max. and min. temperatures in °C
- █ Precipitation totals in mm
Imperial conversion
| J | F | M | A | M | J | J | A | S | O | N | D |
| 3.4 28 16 | 2.8 34 16 | 3.3 54 27 | 5.2 72 39 | 3.5 79 52 | 5.3 81 59 | 5.7 79 63 | 3.3 77 59 | 3.9 75 54 | 4.6 68 46 | 2.3 54 28 | 4.4 36 21 |
- █ Average max. and min. temperatures in °F
- █ Precipitation totals in inches
