= Wayne Township, Champaign County, Ohio =

Township in Ohio, US

- Township
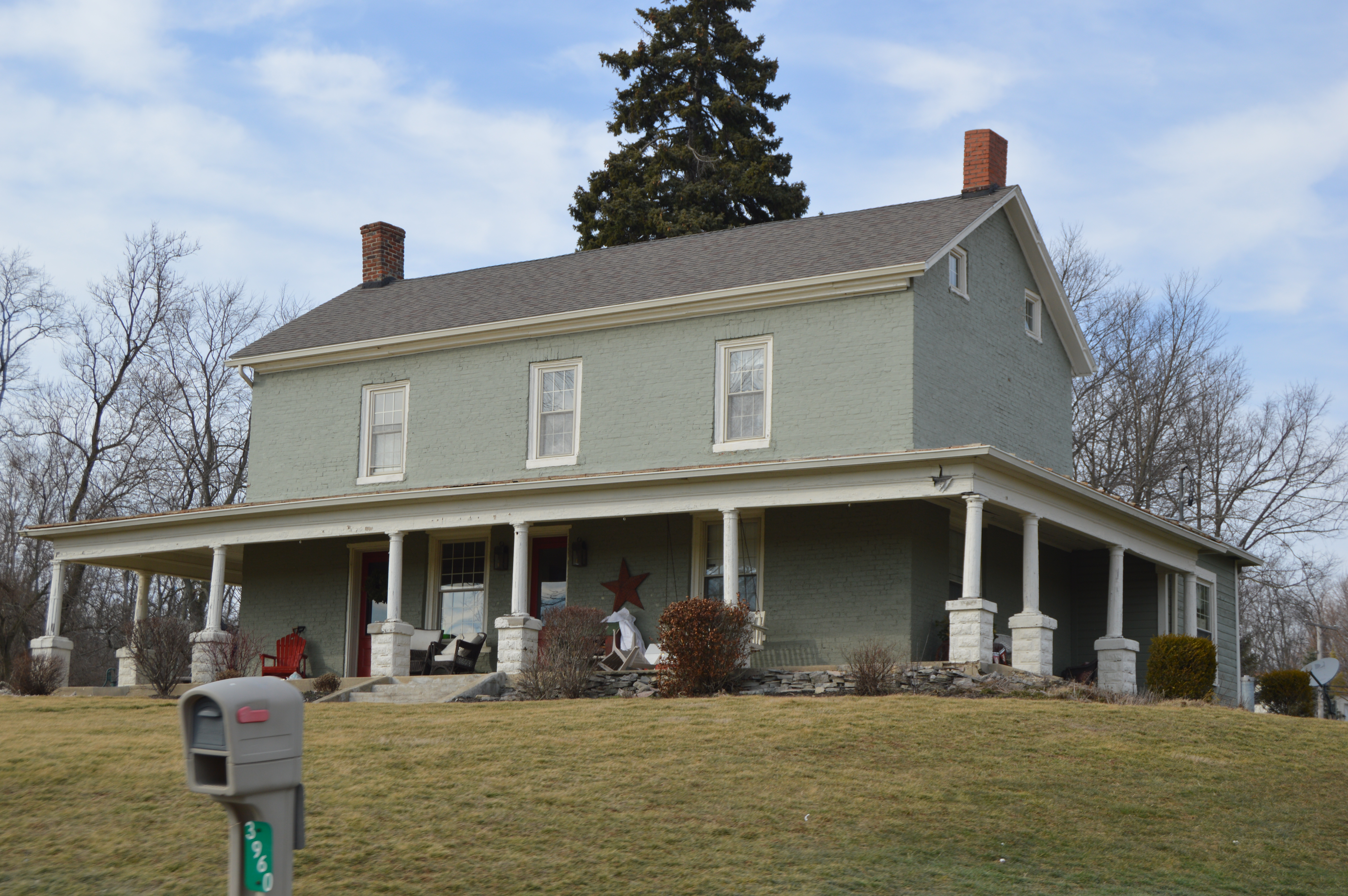
- An I-house farmstead near Cable

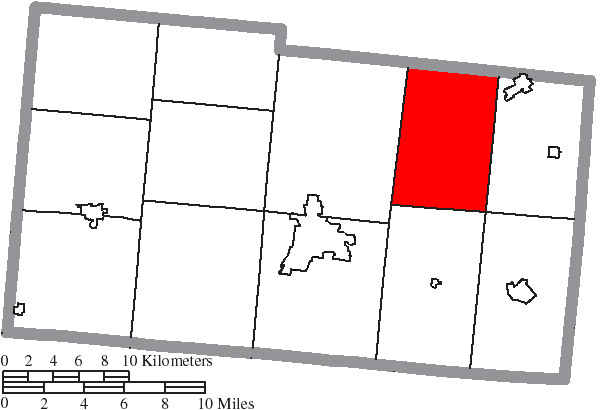
- Location of Wayne Township in Champaign County
- Coordinates: 40°10′42″N 83°38′10″W
- Country: United States
- State: Ohio
- County: Champaign

Area
  - Total: 32.41 sq mi (83.95 km^{2})
  - Land: 32.40 sq mi (83.91 km^{2})
  - Water: 0.019 sq mi (0.05 km^{2})
- Elevation: 1,194 ft (364 m)

Population (2020)
  - Total: 1,872
  - Density: 57.78/sq mi (22.31/km^{2})
- Time zone: UTC-5 (Eastern (EST))
  - Summer (DST): UTC-4 (EDT)
- FIPS code: 39-82096
- GNIS feature ID: 1085849
- Website: https://www.waynetownship-champaigncounty.com/

Wayne Township is one of the twelve townships of Champaign County, Ohio, United States. As of the 2020 census the population was 1,872.

== Geography ==
Located in the northeastern part of the county, it borders the following townships:

- Zane Township, Logan County - northeast
- Rush Township - east
- Goshen Township - southeast corner
- Union Township - south
- Salem Township - west
- Monroe Township, Logan County - northwest

No municipalities are located in Wayne Township, although two unincorporated communities lie in the township: Cable in the center, and Mingo in the north.

== Name and history ==
It is one of twenty Wayne Townships statewide.

Wayne Township was established in 1828 from land given by Rush Township.

== Government ==
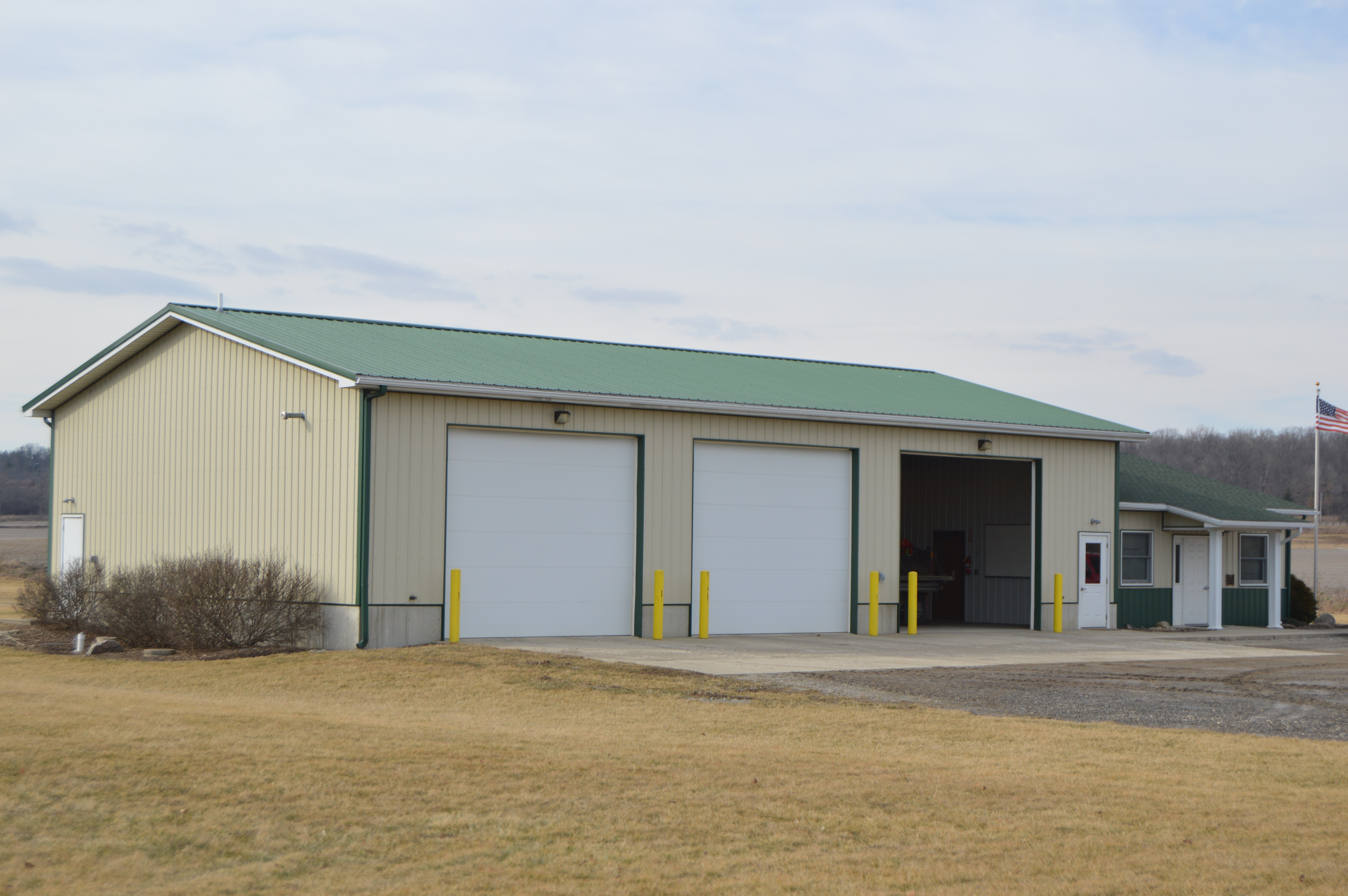
Wayne Township hall in Cable

The township is governed by a three-member board of trustees, who are elected in November of odd-numbered years to a four-year term beginning on the following January 1. Two are elected in the year after the presidential election and one is elected in the year before it. There is also an elected township fiscal officer, who serves a four-year term beginning on April 1 of the year after the election, which is held in November of the year before the presidential election. Vacancies in the fiscal officership or on the board of trustees are filled by the remaining trustees.
