= Middleburg, Logan County, Ohio =

Middleburg, Ohio
- Unincorporated community
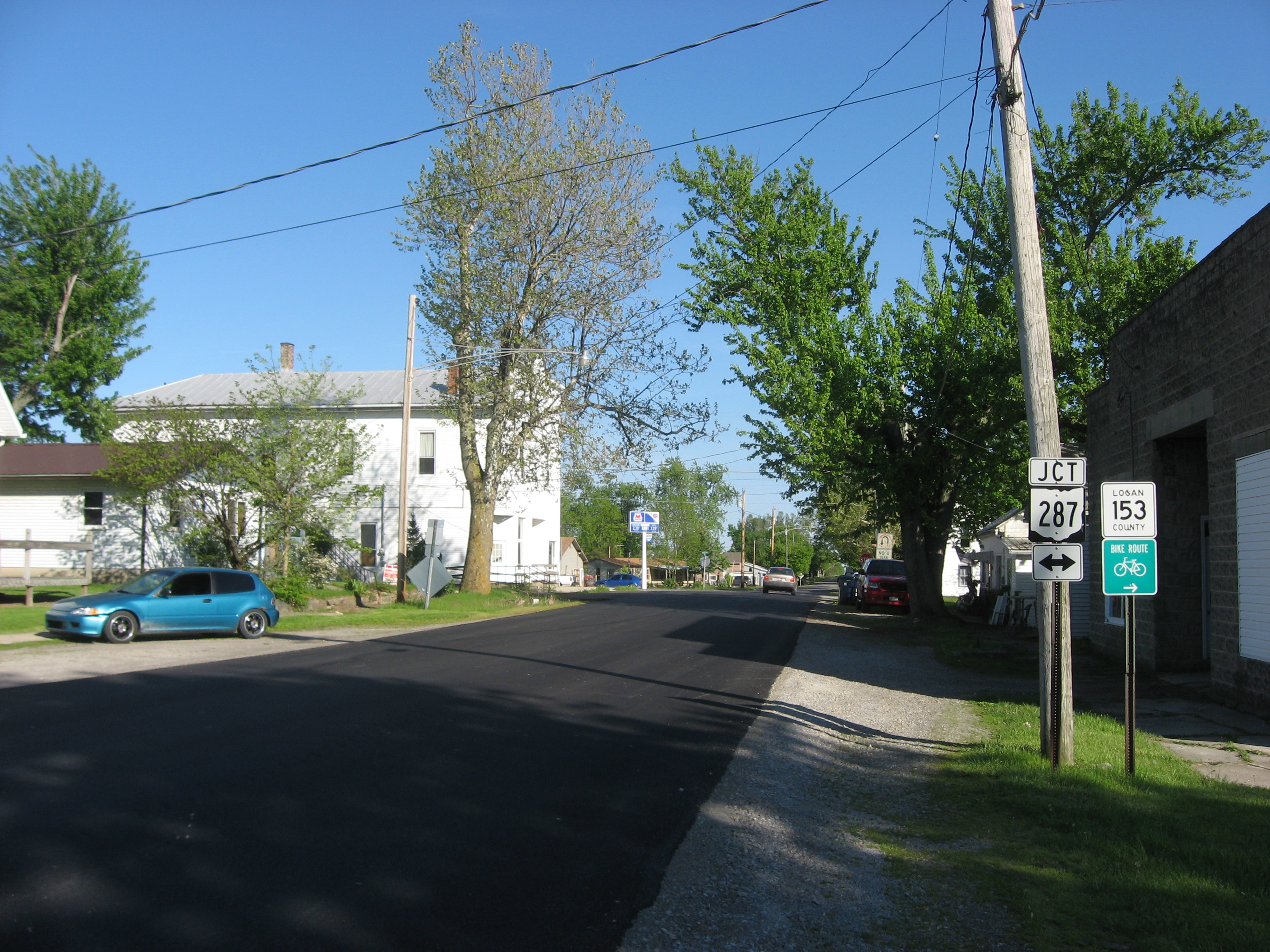
- Streetside in Middleburg
- Motto: "A city for all seasons"
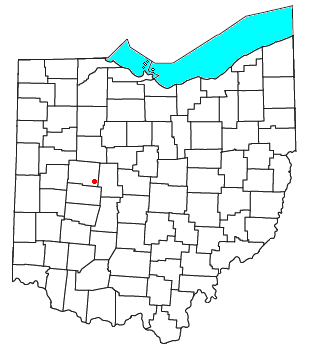
- Location of Middleburg, Ohio
- Coordinates: 40°17′33″N 83°34′57″W
- Country: United States
- State: Ohio
- County: Logan
- Township: Zane
- Elevation: 1,171 ft (357 m)
- Time zone: UTC-5 (Eastern (EST))
  - Summer (DST): UTC-4 (EDT)
- ZIP codes: 43336
- GNIS feature ID: 1061513

Middleburg is an unincorporated community in northern Zane Township, Logan County, Ohio, United States. It has a post office with the ZIP code 43336. It is located at the intersection of State Route 287 with County Road 153, near the headwaters of the Big Darby Creek and a short distance southwest of U.S. Route 33.

Middleburg was platted in 1832. This unincorporated community is located in Ohio.
