= Rush Township, Champaign County, Ohio =

Township in Ohio, US

- Township
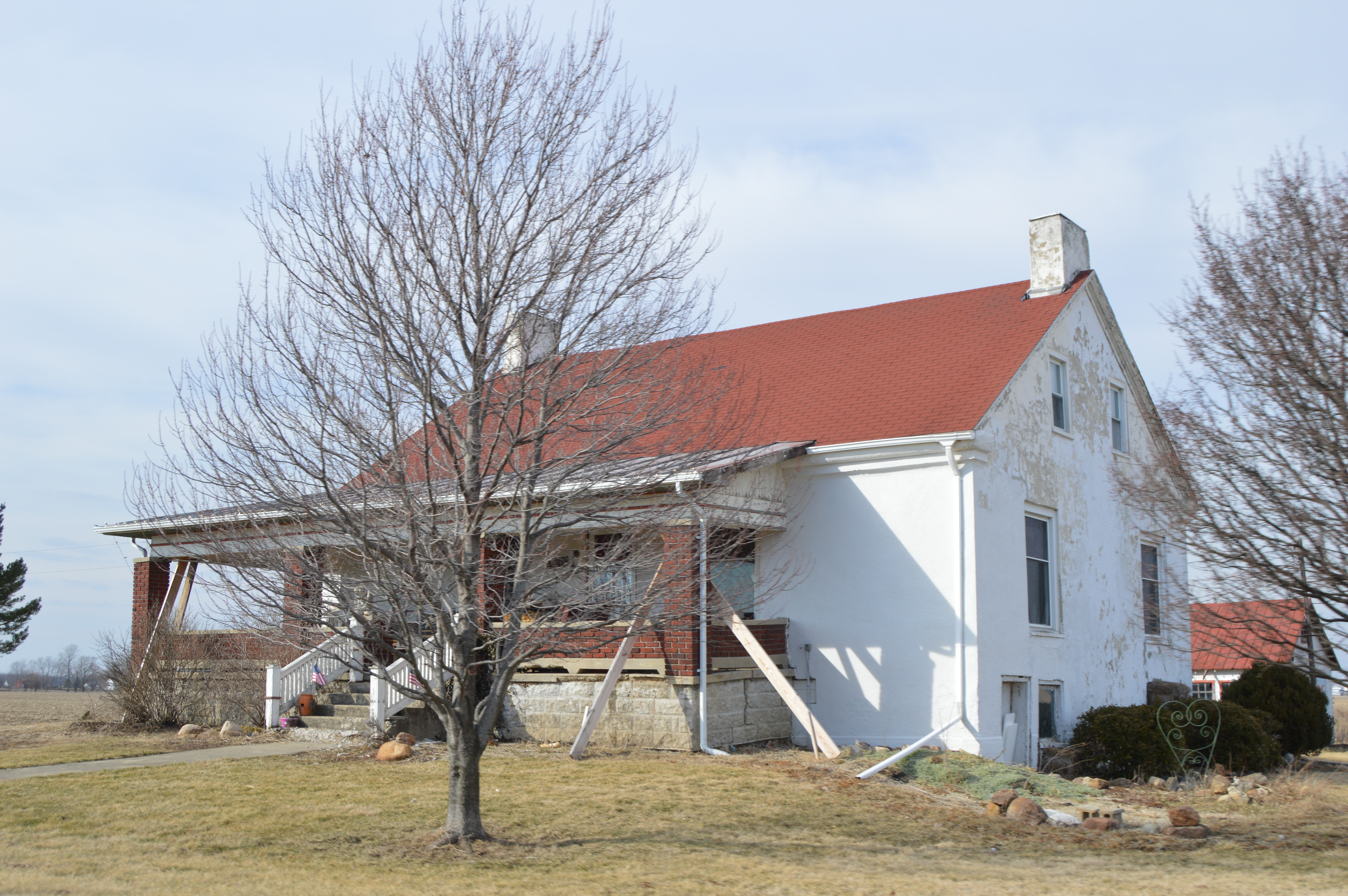
- Early farmhouse east of Woodstock

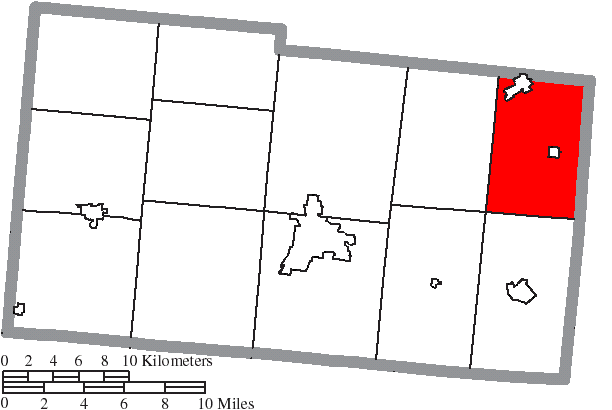
- Location of Rush Township in Champaign County
- Coordinates: 40°11′56″N 83°33′30″W
- Country: United States
- State: Ohio
- County: Champaign

Area
  - Total: 31.7 sq mi (82.2 km^{2})
  - Land: 31.7 sq mi (82.1 km^{2})
  - Water: 0.039 sq mi (0.1 km^{2})
- Elevation: 1,135 ft (346 m)

Population (2020)
  - Total: 2,788
  - Density: 88.0/sq mi (34.0/km^{2})
- Time zone: UTC-5 (Eastern (EST))
  - Summer (DST): UTC-4 (EDT)
- FIPS code: 39-69078
- GNIS feature ID: 1085845
- Website: https://www.rushtownship.us/

Rush Township is one of the twelve townships of Champaign County, Ohio, United States. The 2020 census reported 2,788 people living in the township.

== Geography ==
Located in the northeastern corner of the county, it borders the following townships:

- Allen Township, Union County - northeast
- Union Township, Union County - east
- Goshen Township - south
- Union Township - southwest corner
- Wayne Township - west
- Zane Township, Logan County - northwest

Two villages are located in Rush Township: North Lewisburg in the northwest, and Woodstock in the east.

== Name and history ==
Statewide, other Rush Townships are located in Scioto and Tuscarawas counties.

Rush Township was established in 1828 from land given by Wayne Township.

== Government ==
The township is governed by a three-member board of trustees, who are elected in November of odd-numbered years to a four-year term beginning on the following January 1. Two are elected in the year after the presidential election and one is elected in the year before it. There is also an elected township fiscal officer, who serves a four-year term beginning on April 1 of the year after the election, which is held in November of the year before the presidential election. Vacancies in the fiscal officership or on the board of trustees are filled by the remaining trustees.
