= Ohio Caverns =

Show cave in Ohio, United States

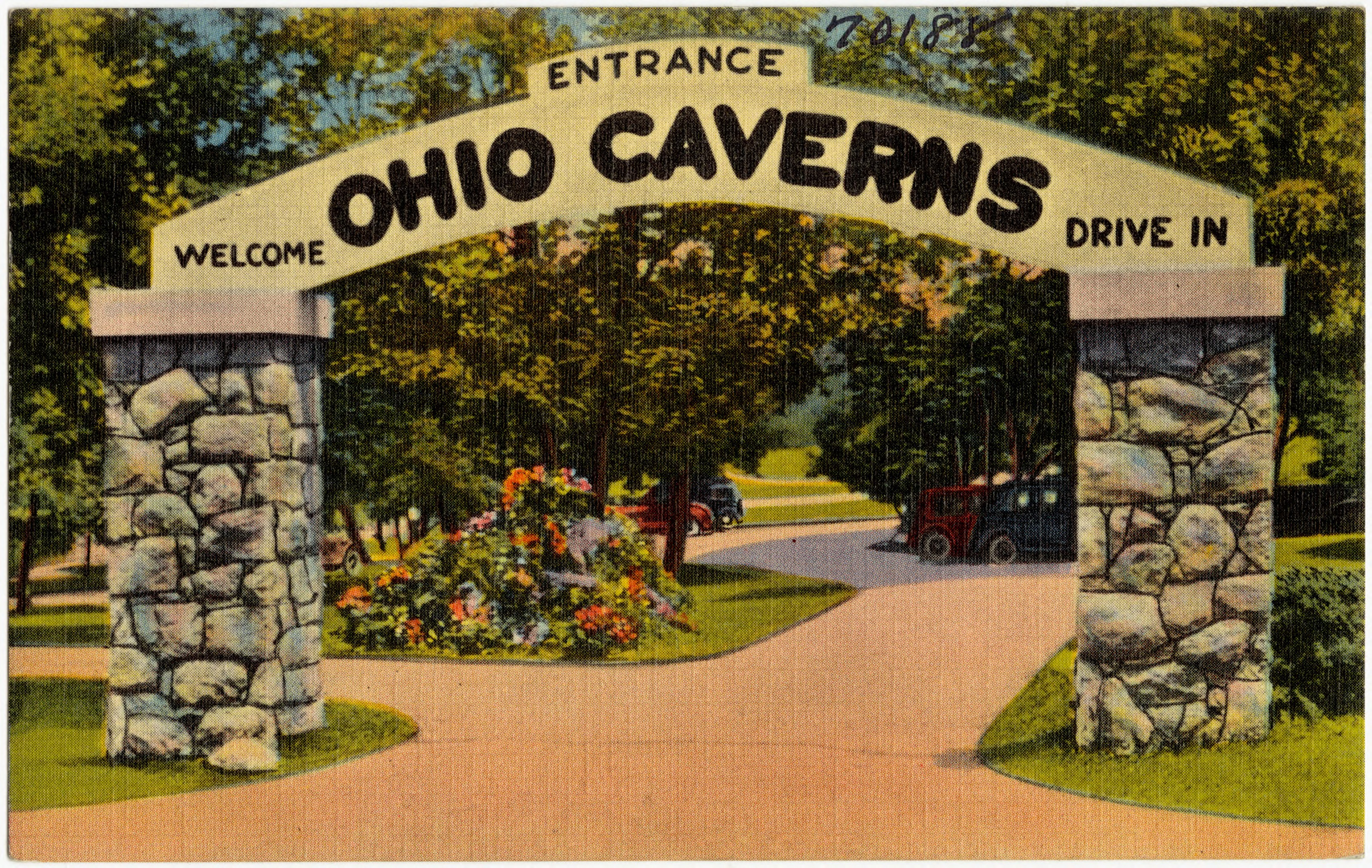
- Postcard view of entrance
- Interactive map of Ohio Caverns
- Nearest city: West Liberty, Ohio
- Coordinates: 40°14′N 83°41′W

Ohio Caverns is a show cave located 30 miles (48 km) from Dayton, Ohio near West Liberty, in Salem Township, Champaign County, Ohio in the United States. A popular tourist destination and member of the National Caving Association, it is the largest of all the cave systems in Ohio and contains many crystal formations. Approximately 90% of its stalactite and stalagmite formations are still active. The cavern system was originally an aquifer, holding an underground river of melted glacier water. This river eventually receded to lower levels of the ground and is now unseen.

== Formation ==
Continued erosion of several glaciers would have been concentrated on areas around the graben, leaving this area without its protective layer of Bedford shale and more susceptible to erosion. The sunken graben area then became a topographical high, now the highest point in Ohio at the elevation of 1549 feet above sea level.
