= West Liberty, Ohio =

- Village
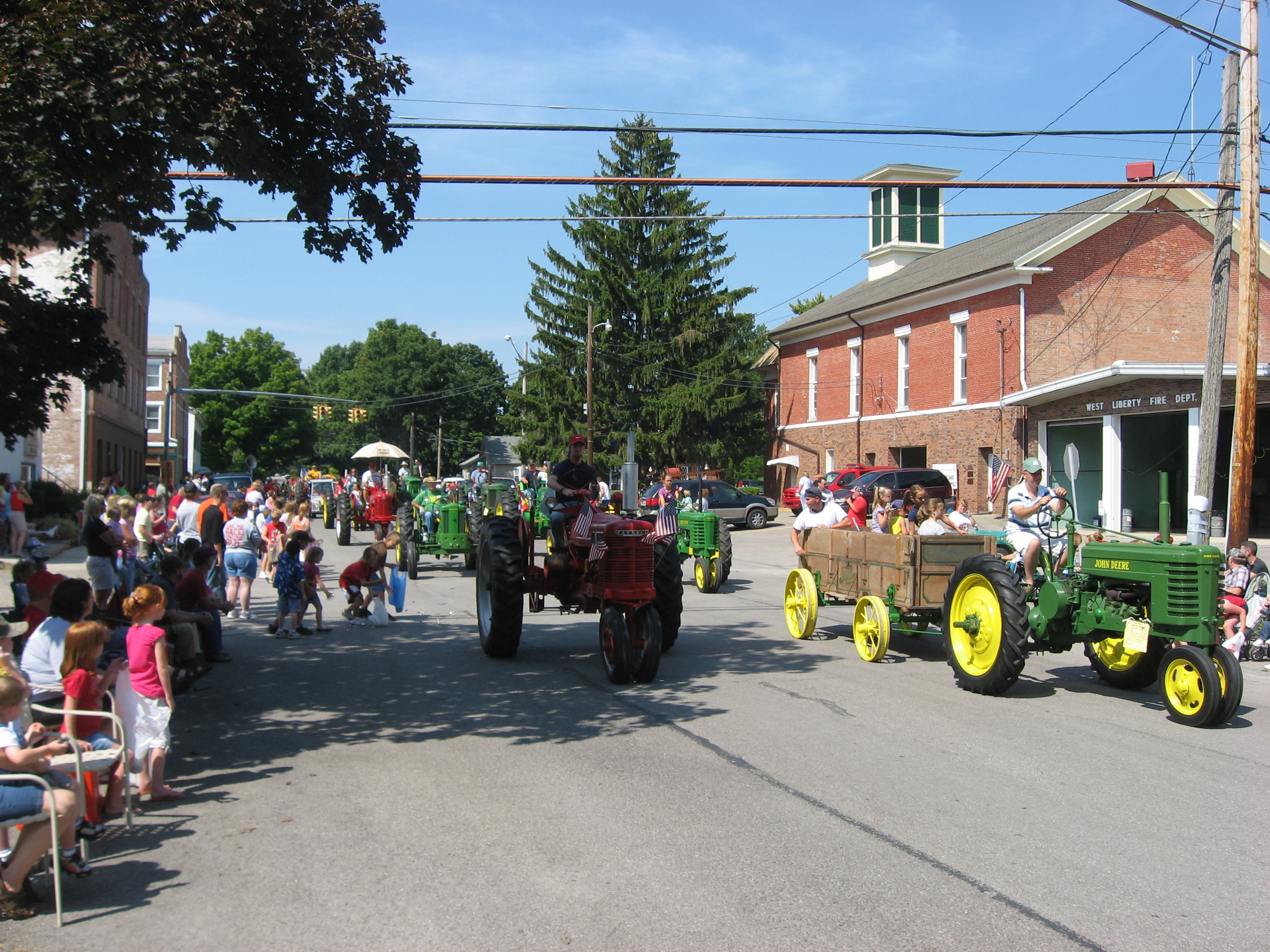
- West Liberty's annual antique tractor parade

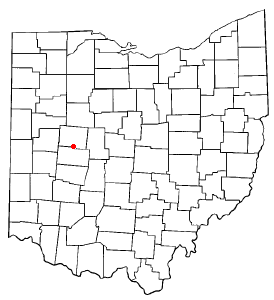
- Location of West Liberty, Ohio

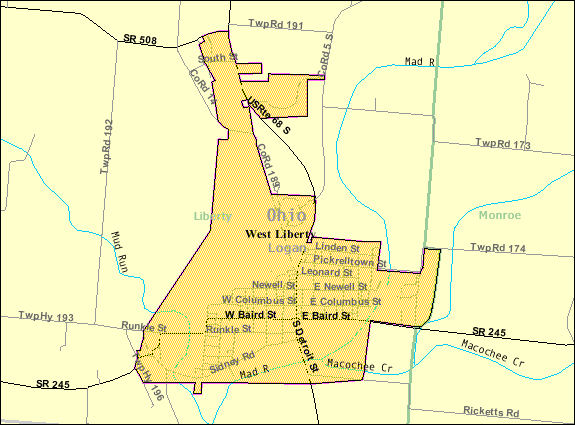
- Detailed map of West Liberty
- Coordinates: 40°15′12″N 83°45′20″W
- Country: United States
- State: Ohio
- Counties: Logan
- Townships: Liberty, Monroe

Area
  - Total: 1.22 sq mi (3.15 km^{2})
  - Land: 1.22 sq mi (3.15 km^{2})
  - Water: 0 sq mi (0.00 km^{2})
- Elevation: 1,198 ft (365 m)

Population (2020)
  - Total: 1,770
  - Density: 1,454.2/sq mi (561.47/km^{2})
- Time zone: UTC-5 (Eastern (EST))
  - Summer (DST): UTC-4 (EDT)
- ZIP code: 43357
- Area codes: 937, 326
- FIPS code: 39-83734
- GNIS feature ID: 2400135
- Website: www.mywestliberty.com

West Liberty is a village in Logan County, Ohio, United States. The population was 1,770 at the 2020 census.

== History ==
West Liberty was laid out in 1817. In 1833, West Liberty contained five stores, two taverns, one tannery, a merchant mill, a saw mill, a carding machine, and about 20 residential houses.

== Geography ==
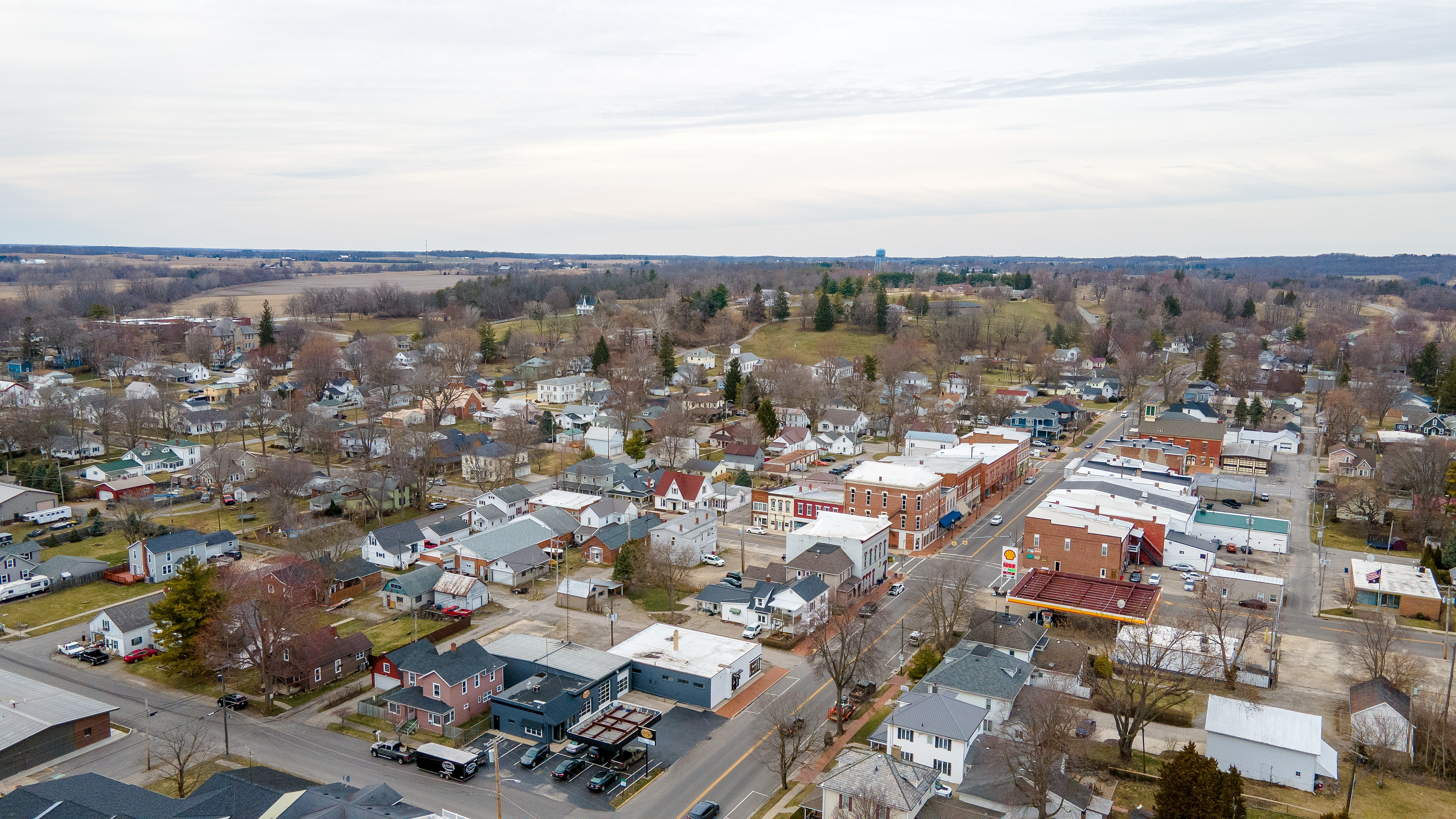
West Liberty, 2021

According to the United States Census Bureau, the village has a total area of 1.12 square miles (2.90 km^{2}), all of it land.

Flowing along the edge of town is the Mad River, a major source of running water in the area.

== Demographics ==
Historical population
Census	Pop.	Note	%±
1850	643		—
1860	916		42.5%
1870	741		−19.1%
1880	715		−3.5%
1900	1,236		—
1910	1,288		4.2%
1920	1,347		4.6%
1930	1,248		−7.3%
1940	1,228		−1.6%
1950	1,397		13.8%
1960	1,522		8.9%
1970	1,580		3.8%
1980	1,653		4.6%
1990	1,613		−2.4%
2000	1,813		12.4%
2010	1,805		−0.4%
2020	1,770		−1.9%
U.S. Decennial Census

=== 2010 census ===
As of the census of 2010, there were 1,805 people, 736 households, and 436 families living in the village. The population density was 1,611.6 inhabitants per square mile (622.2/km^{2}). There were 799 housing units at an average density of 713.4 per square mile (275.4/km^{2}). The racial makeup of the village was 96.1% White, 1.3% African American, 0.1% Native American, 0.6% Asian, 0.1% Pacific Islander, 0.2% from other races, and 1.7% from two or more races. Hispanic or Latino of any race were 0.8% of the population.

There were 736 households, of which 29.5% had children under the age of 18 living with them, 45.9% were married couples living together, 9.4% had a female householder with no husband present, 3.9% had a male householder with no wife present, and 40.8% were non-families. 37.9% of all households were made up of individuals, and 21.2% had someone living alone who was 65 years of age or older. The average household size was 2.26 and the average family size was 3.00.

The median age in the village was 41 years. 25.2% of residents were under the age of 18; 7.8% were between the ages of 18 and 24; 21.5% were from 25 to 44; 22.1% were from 45 to 64; and 23.2% were 65 years of age or older. The gender makeup of the village was 44.6% male and 55.4% female.

=== 2000 census ===
As of the census of 2000, there were 1,813 people, 660 households, and 432 families living in the village. The population density was 1,637.7 inhabitants per square mile (632.3/km^{2}). There were 698 housing units at an average density of 630.5 per square mile (243.4/km^{2}). The racial makeup of the village was 98.46% White, 0.17% African American, 0.28% Native American, 0.28% Asian, 0.11% Pacific Islander, and 0.72% from two or more races. Hispanic or Latino of any race were 0.17% of the population.

There were 660 households, out of which 31.8% had children under the age of 18 living with them, 54.2% were married couples living together, 8.8% had a female householder with no husband present, and 34.4% were non-families. 31.4% of all households were made up of individuals, and 13.2% had someone living alone who was 65 years of age or older. The average household size was 2.36 and the average family size was 2.98.

In the village, the population was spread out, with 23.2% under the age of 18, 6.4% from 18 to 24, 23.5% from 25 to 44, 19.3% from 45 to 64, and 27.6% who were 65 years of age or older. The median age was 43 years. For every 100 females, there were 76.2 males. For every 100 females age 18 and over, there were 70.2 males.

The median income for a household in the village was $38,819, and the median income for a family was $51,193. Males had a median income of $35,000 versus $26,518 for females. The per capita income for the village was $19,083. About 4.9% of families and 5.3% of the population were below the poverty line, including 6.7% of those under age 18 and 5.0% of those age 65 or over.

== Government ==
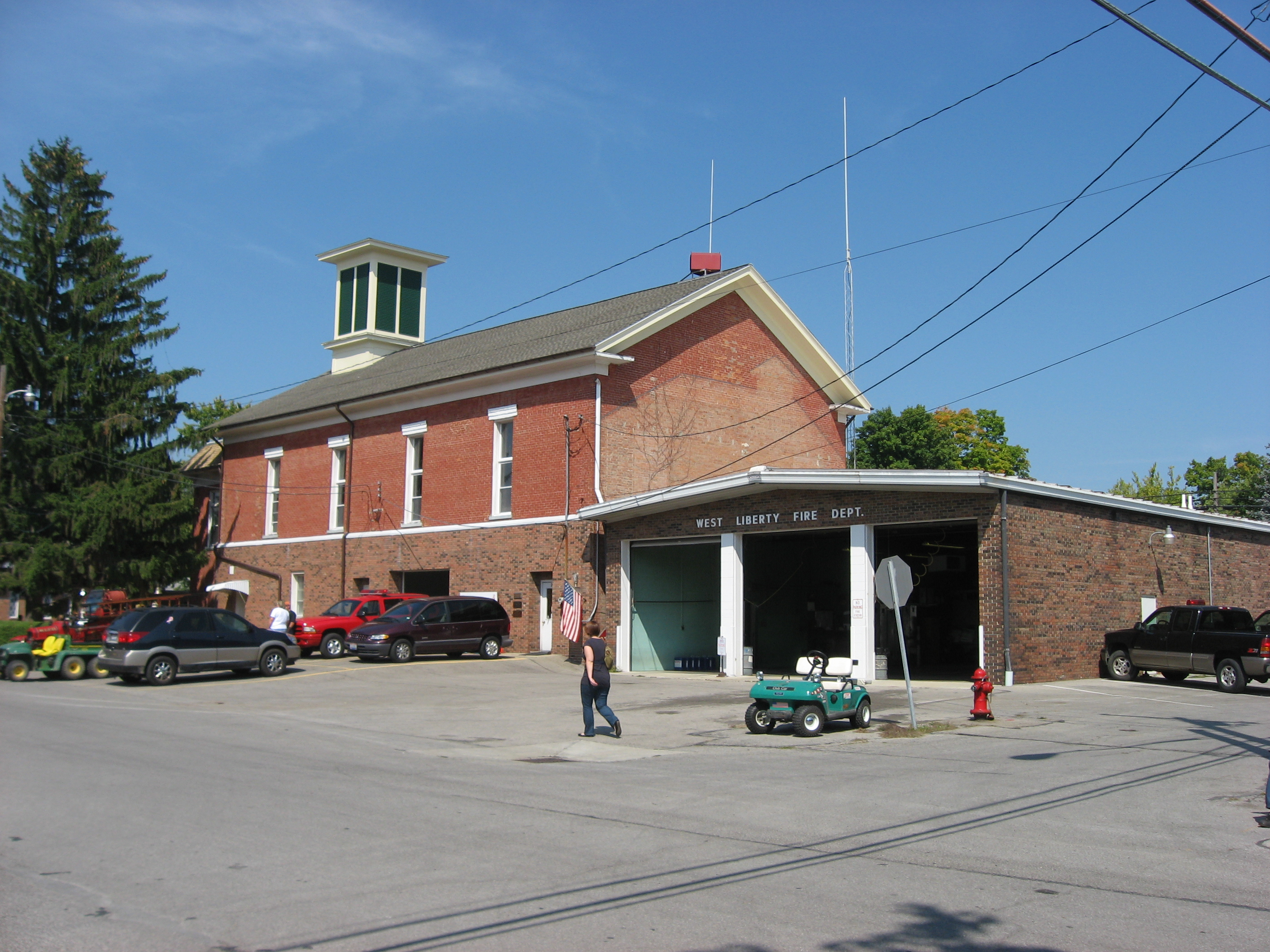
Town hall and fire department

A branch of the Logan County District Library serves the West Liberty community.

In 2024 Brad Hudson, formerly of the village board, was elected Mayor. His term will end December 31, 2027.

In the elections of November 2007, Rebecca Hamilton and Greg Hostetler were elected to the village council, and Brad Hudson and Dean King were elected to the village's board of public affairs. Cindee Boyd was elected clerk-treasurer without opposition.

== Infrastructure ==
=== Transportation ===
U.S. Route 68, known as "Detroit Street", forms the main street in West Liberty. Forming the main east–west street is State Route 245, and its intersection with US 68 is one of the primary intersections of the village. At the far northern end of the village, State Route 508 begins from an intersection with US 68 and heads westward to De Graff.

== Notable people ==
- Donn Piatt, writer and journalist
- Benjamin Piatt Runkle, founder of Sigma Chi
