= North Lewisburg, Ohio =

- Village
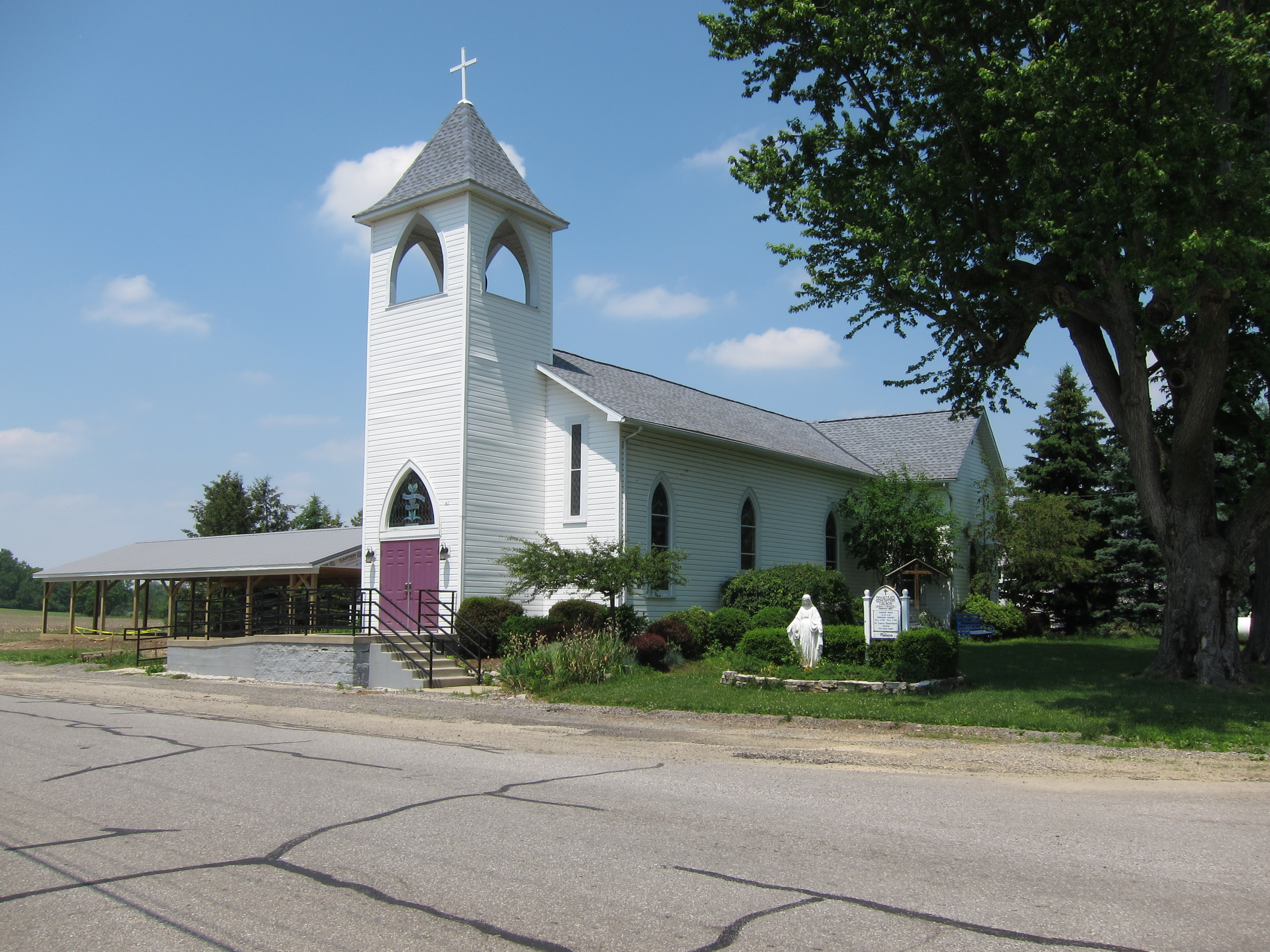
- Immaculate Conception Catholic Church
- Motto: "Where Family, Friends, and Traditions Stay for a Lifetime."
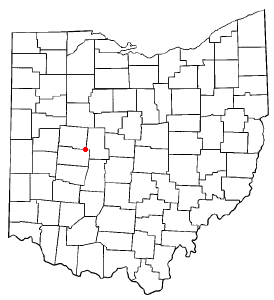
- Location of North Lewisburg, Ohio

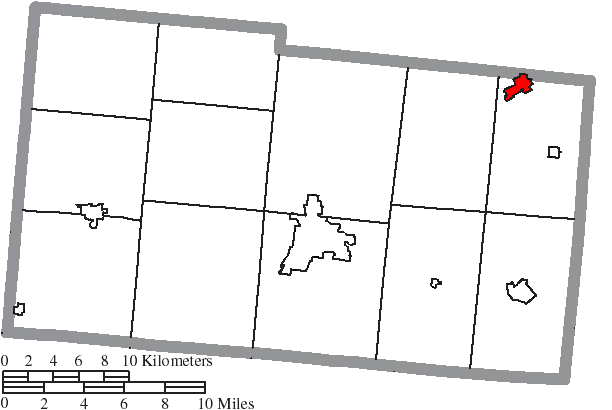
- Location of North Lewisburg in Champaign County
- Coordinates: 40°13′14″N 83°33′29″W
- Country: United States
- State: Ohio
- County: Champaign
- Township: Rush

Government
  - Mayor: Cheryl Hollingsworth

Area
  - Total: 1.08 sq mi (2.81 km^{2})
  - Land: 1.08 sq mi (2.81 km^{2})
  - Water: 0 sq mi (0.00 km^{2})
- Elevation: 1,099 ft (335 m)

Population (2020)
  - Total: 1,636
  - Density: 1,505.8/sq mi (581.38/km^{2})
- Time zone: UTC-5 (Eastern (EST))
  - Summer (DST): UTC-4 (EDT)
- ZIP code: 43060
- Area codes: 937, 326
- FIPS code: 39-56770
- GNIS feature ID: 2399517
- Website: www.northlewisburg.com

North Lewisburg is a village in Champaign County, Ohio. The population was 1,636 at the time of the 2020 census.

== History ==
North Lewisburg was platted in 1826, and incorporated as a village in 1844. A post office has been in operation at North Lewisburg since 1845.

== Geography ==
According to the United States Census Bureau, the village has a total area of 1.15 square miles (2.98 km^{2}), all of it land.

== Demographics ==
Historical population
Census	Pop.	Note	%±
1850	302		—
1860	379		25.5%
1870	733		93.4%
1880	936		27.7%
1890	806		−13.9%
1900	846		5.0%
1910	793		−6.3%
1920	720		−9.2%
1930	686		−4.7%
1940	720		5.0%
1950	854		18.6%
1960	879		2.9%
1970	840		−4.4%
1980	1,072		27.6%
1990	1,160		8.2%
2000	1,588		36.9%
2010	1,490		−6.2%
2020	1,636		9.8%
U.S. Decennial Census

=== 2010 census ===
As of the census of 2010, there were 1,490 people, 593 households, and 389 families living in the village. The population density was 1,295.7 inhabitants per square mile (500.3/km^{2}). There were 679 housing units at an average density of 590.4 per square mile (228.0/km^{2}). The racial makeup of the village was 95.6% White, 0.4% African American, 0.6% Native American, 0.5% Asian, 0.1% from other races, and 2.9% from two or more races. Hispanic or Latino of any race were 0.9% of the population.

There were 593 households, of which 36.8% had children under the age of 18 living with them, 50.6% were married couples living together, 10.3% had a female householder with no husband present, 4.7% had a male householder with no wife present, and 34.4% were non-families. 29.3% of all households were made up of individuals, and 11.3% had someone living alone who was 65 years of age or older. The average household size was 2.51 and the average family size was 3.11.

The median age in the village was 35.4 years. 27% of residents were under the age of 18; 7.8% were between the ages of 18 and 24; 29.5% were from 25 to 44; 24.7% were from 45 to 64; and 11% were 65 years of age or older. The gender makeup of the village was 50.5% male and 49.5% female.

=== 2000 census ===
As of the census of 2000, there were 1,588 people, 598 households, and 429 families living in the village. The population density was 1,776.7 inhabitants per square mile (686.0/km^{2}). There were 654 housing units at an average density of 731.7 per square mile (282.5/km^{2}). The racial makeup of the village was 97.23% White, 0.82% African American, 0.31% Native American, 0.06% Asian, 0.44% from other races, and 1.13% from two or more races. Hispanic or Latino of any race were 0.63% of the population.

There were 598 households, out of which 42.8% had children under the age of 18 living with them, 55.2% were married couples living together, 13.2% had a female householder with no husband present, and 28.1% were non-families. 24.1% of all households were made up of individuals, and 9.2% had someone living alone who was 65 years of age or older. The average household size was 2.66 and the average family size was 3.15.

In the village, the population was spread out, with 31.2% under the age of 18, 10.3% from 18 to 24, 34.2% from 25 to 44, 15.9% from 45 to 64, and 8.4% who were 65 years of age or older. The median age was 30 years. For every 100 females there were 103.1 males. For every 100 females age 18 and over, there were 96.1 males.

The median income for a household in the village was $45,921, and the median income for a family was $51,083. Males had a median income of $36,563 versus $27,667 for females. The per capita income for the village was $18,461. About 4.3% of families and 7.3% of the population were below the poverty line, including 8.6% of those under age 18 and 6.9% of those age 65 or over.

== Education ==
The village is served by the Triad Local School District, which operates an elementary school (PK-4), a middle school (5–8), and Triad High School (9–12).. North Lewisburg has a public library, a branch of the Champaign County Public Library.

== Notable people ==
- Matt Rife, comedian
- Frank K. Spain, inventor
