= Chippewa Park, Ohio =

- Census-designated place
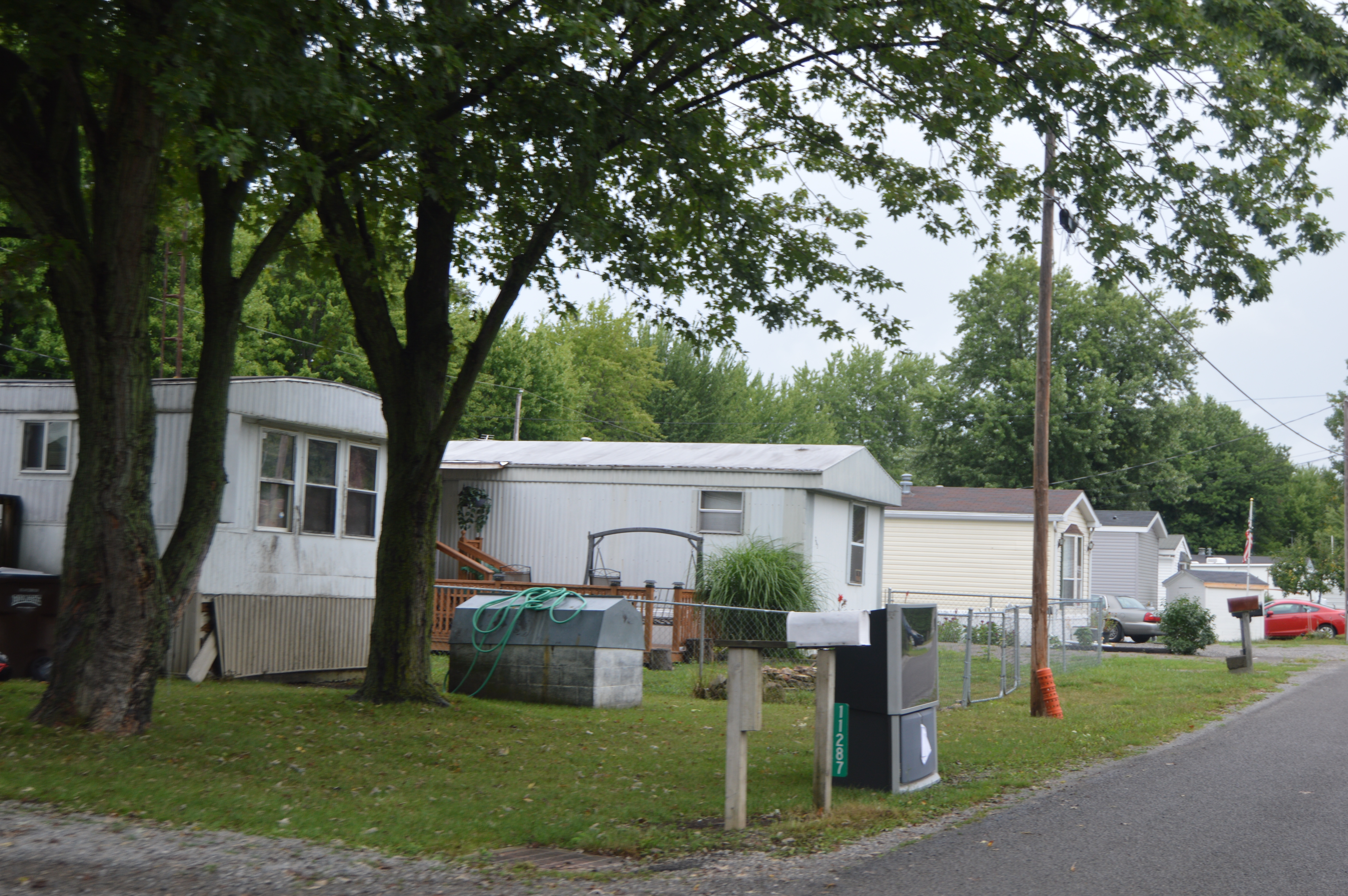
- Mohawk Path

- Location within Ohio Location within the United States
- Coordinates: 40°30′58″N 83°53′15″W
- Country: United States
- State: Ohio
- County: Logan
- Township: Stokes

Area
  - Total: 0.49 sq mi (1.28 km^{2})
  - Land: 0.44 sq mi (1.14 km^{2})
  - Water: 0.054 sq mi (0.14 km^{2})
- Elevation: 1,014 ft (309 m)

Population (2020)
  - Total: 819
  - Density: 1,860.4/sq mi (718.32/km^{2})
- Time zone: UTC-5 (Eastern (EST))
  - Summer (DST): UTC-4 (EDT)
- ZIP code: 43331 (Lakeview)
- FIPS code: 39-14280
- GNIS feature ID: 2628906

Chippewa Park is a census-designated place in Stokes Township, Logan County, Ohio, United States. As of the 2020 census, the population was 819.

== Geography ==
Chippewa Park is in northwestern Logan County, in the northeast part of Stokes Township. The CDP is located along the northern shore of Indian Lake and includes the neighborhood known as Island View. The northern edge of the CDP follows Ohio State Route 235, the eastern edge follows Blackhawk Run, the southern edge is the shore of Indian Lake, and the western edge is the border of Indian Lake State Park.

The community is 4 miles (6 km) northeast of the village of Lakeview, 20 miles (32 km) southwest of Kenton, and 23 miles (37 km) southeast of Lima. According to the U.S. Census Bureau, the CDP has a total area of 0.50 square miles (1.3 km^{2}), of which 0.04 square miles (0.1 km^{2}), or 10.77%, are water.

== Demographics ==
Historical population
Census	Pop.	Note	%±
2020	819		—
U.S. Decennial Census
