= Ohio State Route 365 =

State highway in Logan County, Ohio, US

State Route 365
- SR 365 highlighted in red

Route information
- Maintained by ODOT
- Length: 0.16 mi (260 m)
- Existed: 1934–present

Major junctions
- West end: SR 235 / SR 366 near Lakeview
- East end: Indian Lake State Park near Lakeview

Location
- Country: United States
- State: Ohio
- Counties: Logan

Highway system
- Ohio State Highway System; Interstate; US; State; Scenic
← SR 364	→ SR 366

State Route 365 (SR 365) is a very short two-lane east–west state highway in western Ohio. It is currently the shortest signed state route in Ohio. Its western terminus is at a T-intersection with the SR 235/SR 366 concurrency one mile (1.6 km) north of the village of Lakeview. After running east and south for less than 980 feet (300 m), the highway arrives at its eastern terminus in Indian Lake State Park, serving a boat launch on the western shore of Indian Lake.

This spur route was created in 1934, and runs exclusively in Logan County. At a length of just 0.16 miles (260 m), SR 365 is one of the shortest state highways in Ohio.

== Route description ==
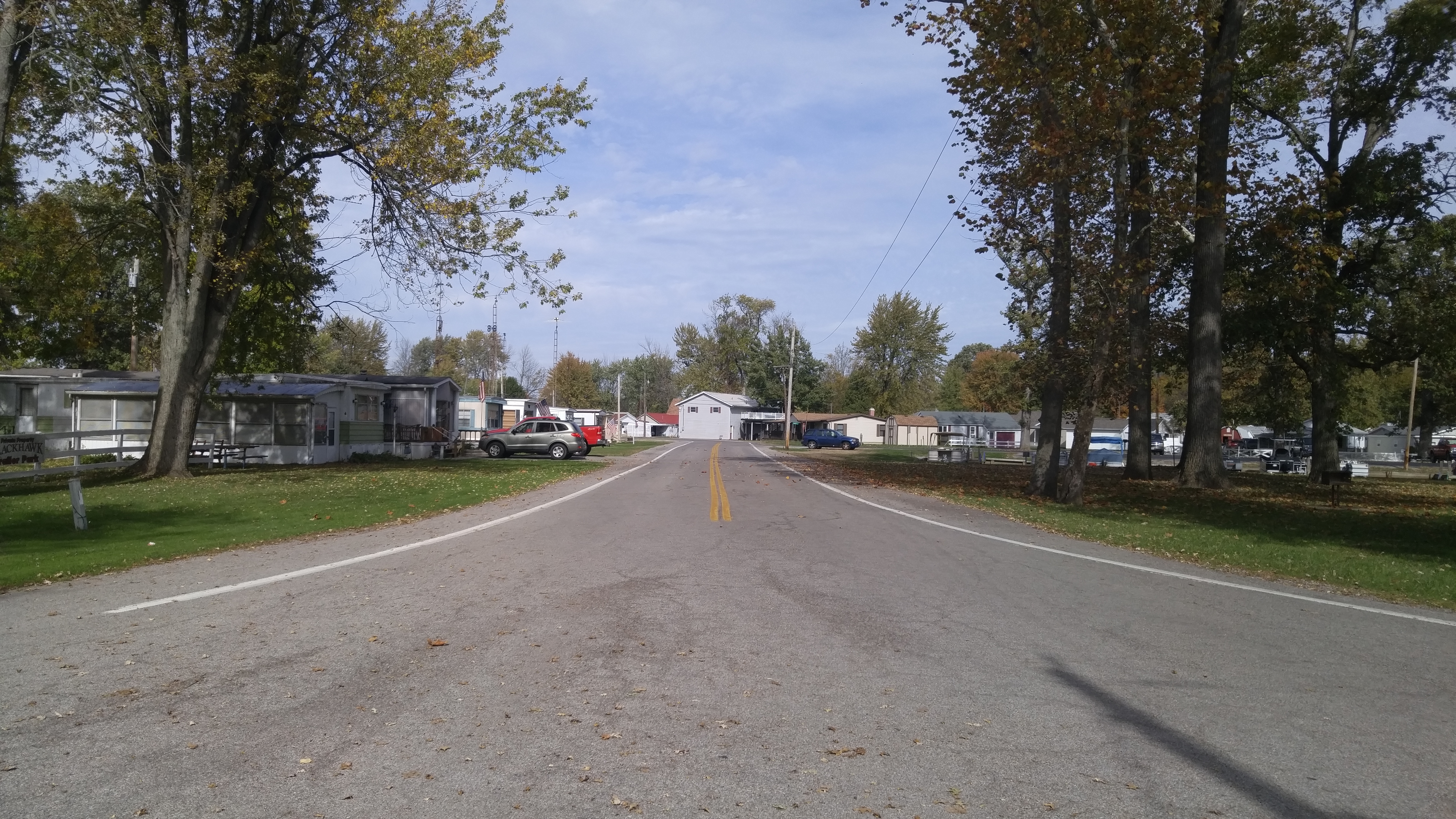
Eastern terminus of SR 365

All of SR 365 exists within Stokes Township in northwestern Logan County. Around 230 vehicles use the route on average each day. SR 365 is one of the shortest state routes in Ohio, and there are no reassurance markers directly on SR 365. There is only one location marker on the route, at the beginning of the road. All of SR 365 is paved in asphalt concrete.

SR 365 begins at a T-intersection with the concurrency of SR 235 and SR 366 about one mile (1.6 km) north of Lakeview. The highway travels amidst a neighborhood of cottages as it heads east, with side streets radiating from it. After several jaunts, SR 365 proceeds south. The highway then arrives at its endpoint at a parking lot for a boat launch serving Indian Lake State Park on the west side of Indian Lake. A small driveway at SR 365's terminus leads back to SR 235/366. Due to the lack of reassurance markers on SR 365, there are no markers marking the end of the route.

== History ==
The spur route was designated in 1934 along the short path that it currently runs, on land that a local farmer, Frank Fox, deeded to the state to connect to Blackhawk State Park (now Indian Lake State Park). No significant changes have taken place to SR 365 since its inception. For decades, it was the state's shortest state route. On October 6, 1962, the Ohio Department of Highways designated the route as part of a 2,174-mile-long (3,499 km) statewide network of scenic routes.

== Major intersections ==
The entire route is in Stokes Township, Logan County.

mi	km	Destinations	Notes
0.00	0.00	SR 235 / SR 366	
0.16	0.26	Indian Lake State Park	Boat launch parking lot
1.000 mi = 1.609 km; 1.000 km = 0.621 mi
