= Ohio State Route 708 =

State highway in Logan County, Ohio, US

State Route 708

Route information
- Maintained by ODOT
- Length: 2.32 mi (3.73 km)
- Existed: 1937–present

Major junctions
- South end: SR 235 near Russells Point
- US 33 in Russells Point
- North end: Indian Lake State Park near Russells Point

Location
- Country: United States
- State: Ohio
- Counties: Logan

Highway system
- Ohio State Highway System; Interstate; US; State; Scenic
← SR 707	→ SR 709

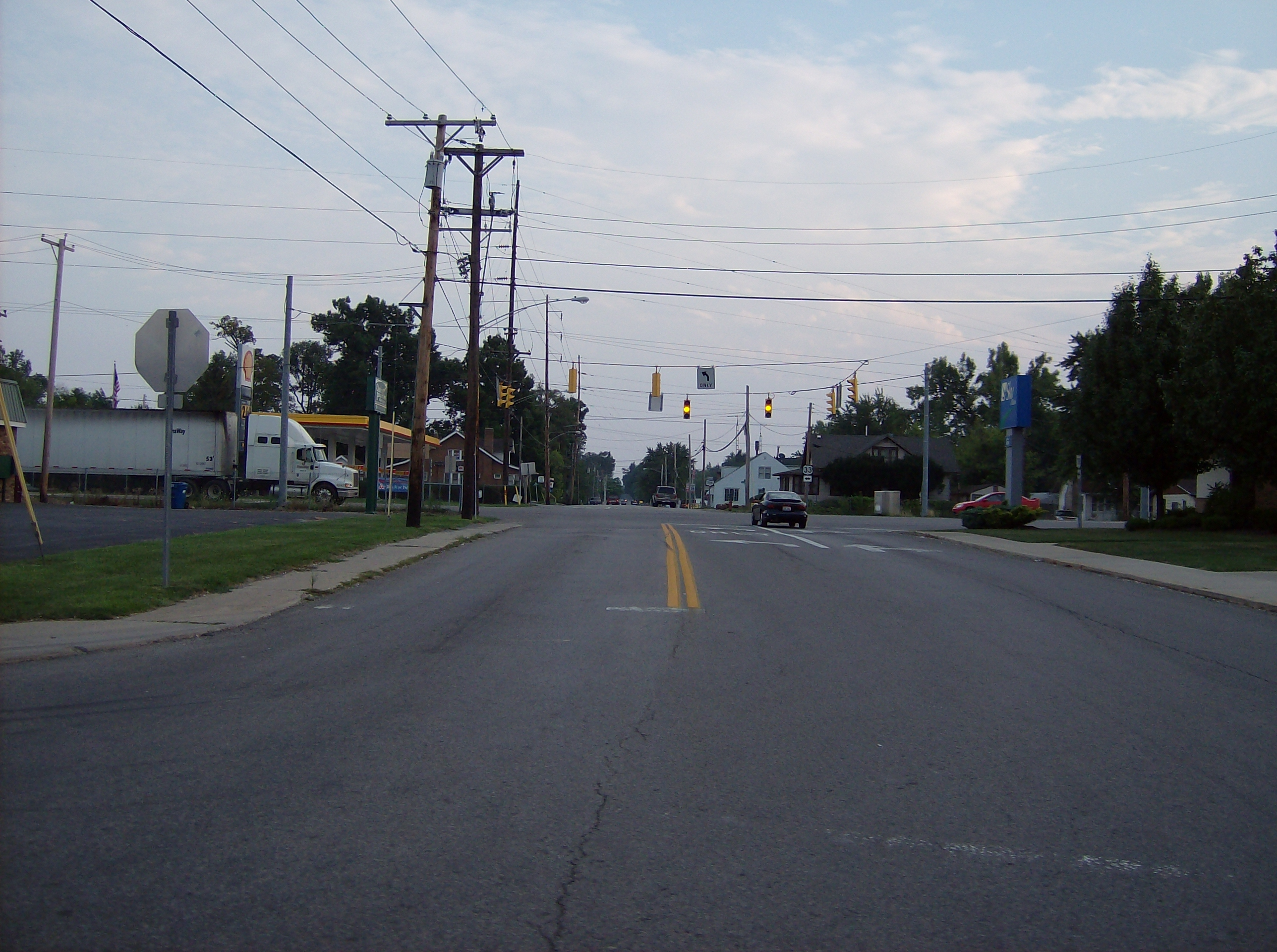
SR 708 in downtown Russells Point

State Route 708 (SR 708) is a short two-lane north–south state route that runs exclusively within Logan County, Ohio. The southern terminus of SR 708 approximately two miles (3.2 km) south of Russells Point at SR 235, near the Russells Point Honda manufacturing facility, and its northern terminus is just north of Russells Point at Indian Lake State Park, where the highway becomes Township Road 253 on Orchard Island.

== Route description ==
SR 708 begins at its junction with SR 235 in Washington Township, at the northwestern corner of the Russells Point Honda manufacturing plant. SR 708 heads east from that intersection, brushing the northern portion of the production facility's property, then following a sweeping curve to the part of northeast, amidst which the highway intersects Roughton Road. Now traveling in a northerly direction, the highway meets World Class Drive, which forms the northerly leg of the intersection between SR 235 and SR 708, and virtually acts as a loop that comes back around to meet SR 708. North of there, SR 708 curves to the northeast, and enters into Russells Point. Known as Orchard Island Road through the village, SR 708 passes by a number of side streets before entering into the main business district of Russells Point. There, SR 708 arrives at a signalized intersection with US 33, followed just one block later by its junction with SR 366. Northeast of SR 366, SR 708 makes its way out onto Orchard Island in Indian Lake. The route turns easterly briefly, then takes a sweeping curve to the northeast that brings the route to a bridge over a connector waterway within Indian Lake, where SR 708 departs Russells Point and enters onto Orchard Island. About a block later, SR 708 arrives at its northern terminus at Indian Lake State Park, where the route transitions into Township Road 253, which continues further onto the cottage-filled island that serves as part of the state park.

== History ==
SR 708 was first designated in 1937 along the routing that it currently occupies south of SR 366. Except for the extension of SR 708 along what was designated SR 367 into Orchard Island, no other significant changes have taken place to the routing of SR 708 itself. The route that SR 708 meets at its southern terminus was first designated SR 69; eventually, it was renumbered SR 235. Also, the route that SR 708 intersects in Russells Point was first given the name of SR 32. Later, it would be replaced by US 33, and when US 33 was re-aligned further south, the former alignment became an extension of SR 366.

=== State Route 367 ===
State Route 367
- Location: Russells Point, Ohio
- Length: 0.7 mi (1,100 m)
- Existed: 1933–1938

State Route 367 (SR 367) was a very short, former state route that linked State Route 32 (SR 32, now SR 366) in Russells Point to Chestnut Street and Chautauqua Boulevard in Orchard Island, exclusively in Logan County. SR 367 was designated in 1933, and was replaced by SR 708 in 1938.

SR 367 was paved in gravel and was a two-lane highway during its existence. The Indian Lake and Fox Island state parks are near SR 367. The name of the road that SR 367 used to follow is called North Orchard Island Road.

The route started at SR 32, which is now SR 366. SR 367 headed northeast, through downtown Russells Point, moving past a few stores, and curved east. Then, SR 367 curved back northeast and crossed a small bridge that lead to Orchard Island. The route continued moving northeast in a straight line, and ended at the intersection of Chestnut Street and Chautauqua Boulevard, which leads to the entrance of Fox Island State Park. Orchard Drive continued after this point, leading to another island and residential area.

SR 367 was designated in 1933, and was replaced by SR 708 in 1938, as it was extended. No routing changes were made during that time. The number 367 has not been used for any numbered highway in Ohio since.

Browse numbered routes
← SR 366	OH	→ SR 368

== Major intersections ==
The entire route is in Logan County.

Location	mi	km	Destinations	Notes
Washington Township	0.00	0.00	SR 235 / World Class Drive – Lakeview, Dayton	Southern terminus
Russells Point	1.64	2.64	US 33	
Russells Point	1.69	2.72	SR 366 (Main Street)	
Washington Township	2.32	3.73	Indian Lake State Park	Northern terminus; continues as Township Road 253
1.000 mi = 1.609 km; 1.000 km = 0.621 mi
