= Ohio State Route 368 =

State highway in Logan County, Ohio, US

State Route 368

Route information
- Maintained by ODOT
- Length: 2.59 mi (4.17 km)
- Existed: 1934–present

Major junctions
- South end: SR 366 near Russells Point
- North end: CR 272 / CR 286 near Russells Point

Location
- Country: United States
- State: Ohio
- Counties: Logan

Highway system
- Ohio State Highway System; Interstate; US; State; Scenic
← SR 367	→ SR 369

State Route 368 (SR 368) is a short north–south state highway in western Ohio, a U.S. state. SR 368 travels from its southern terminus at SR 366 approximately 1.75 miles (2.82 km) east of Russells Point to its northern terminus on Seminole Island in the eastern half of Indian Lake, at an intersection where it meets Logan County Road 272 (CR 272) and CR 286. Having made its debut in the late 1930s, SR 368 is a two-lane spur route that serves both Indian Lake State Park and communities of cottages that are on two eastern Indian Lake islands: Shawnee and Seminole.

== Route description ==
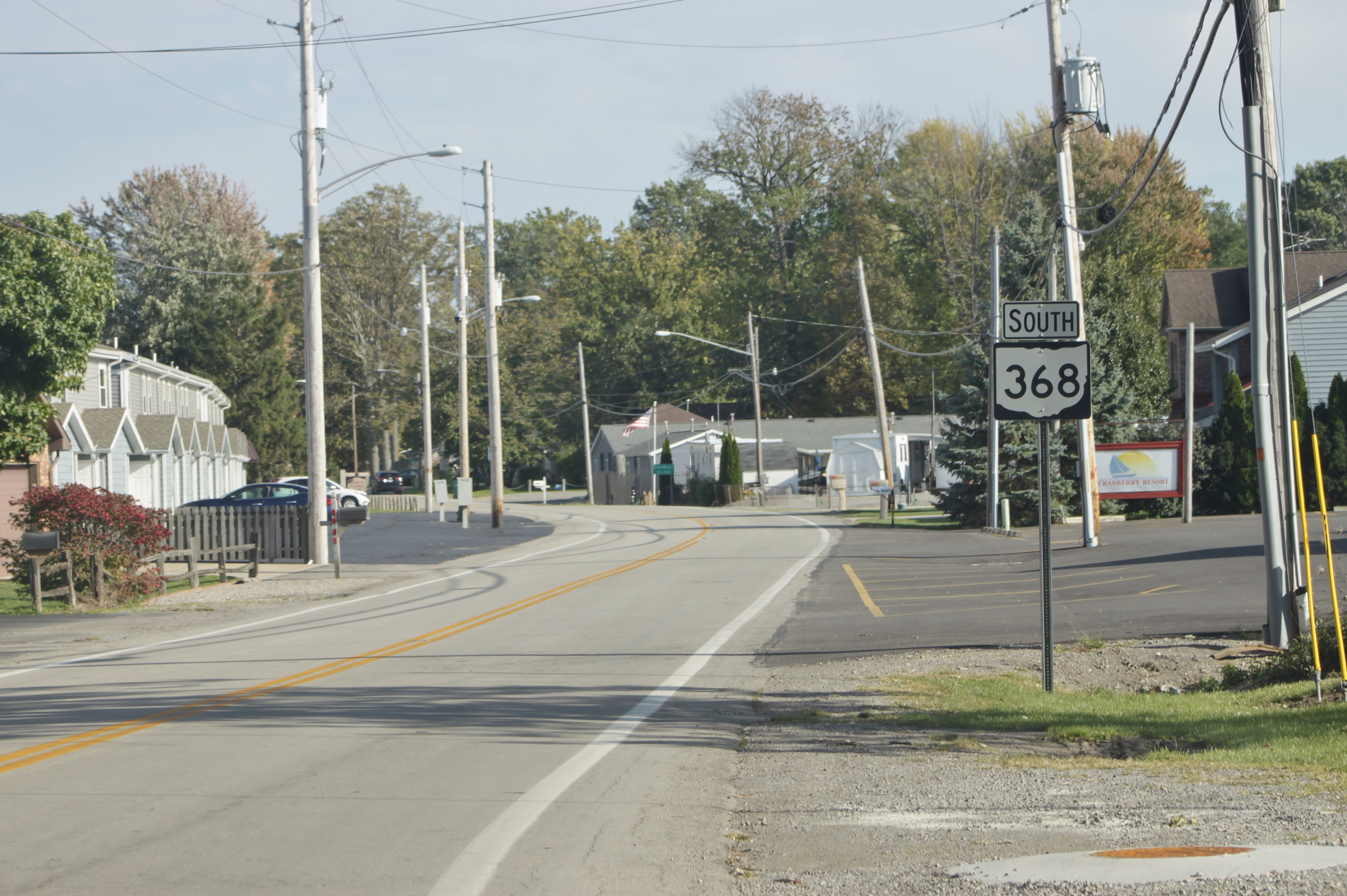
Looking southbound on SR 368 from its terminus on Seminole Island

SR 368 is located exclusively in northwestern Logan County. About 3,100 vehicles travel on SR 368 on average each day.

The route begins at a T-intersection (formerly a Y-intersection) with SR 366 in McArthur Township about 1.75 miles (2.82 km) east of Russells Point. From there, it heads due north, abutted by a subdivision of cottages on the west side and open fields on the east side. After entering into the property of Indian Lake State Park, SR 368 bends to the northwest, passing amidst a blend of fields and trees as it crosses into Washington Township. The highway next passes an access road to a state park boat launch for Indian Lake.

As it turns to the north, SR 368 traverses into a heavily wooded area. Along this stretch, SR 368 passes into Stokes Township. It curves to the northeast as it departs the forest and enters into a neighborhood of cottages along a very narrow strip of land as it travels further out onto Indian Lake. After it travels through an S-curve, SR 368 continues to the northeast, then bends to the northwest, crosses over an inlet and enters Shawnee Island. Turning to the west-northwest, SR 368 passes amidst numerous houses and cottages on Shawnee Island. The highway then passes onto Seminole Island, on which the highway comes to an end as it arrives at an intersection where it meets CR 272, which heads north from the intersection, and CR 286, which departs to the southwest.

== History ==
SR 368 made its debut in 1934. It was originally routed along the exact alignment that it utilizes today. The only difference was that at the time, the route SR 368 met at its southern terminus was known as SR 32, which a few years later would become US 33.

In 1961, US 33 was moved to a new alignment further south. Consequently, the SR 366 designation was applied to the former alignment of the U.S. highway. However, at the same time, SR 368 was extended east, running concurrent with SR 366 east to SR 117 north of Huntsville, where both routes arrived at a shared terminus. This remained the case until 1979, when SR 368 was restored back to its original alignment, leaving SR 366 as the solo route between SR 368 and SR 117.

== Major intersections ==
The entire route is in Logan County.

Location	mi	km	Destinations	Notes
Richland Township	0.00	0.00	SR 366	
Stokes Township	2.59	4.17	CR 272 (Seminole Shore Drive) / CR 286 (Buckeye Drive)	
1.000 mi = 1.609 km; 1.000 km = 0.621 mi
