= Ohio State Route 720 =

State highway in western Ohio, US

State Route 720

Route information
- Maintained by O.D.O.T.
- Length: 8.20 mi (13.20 km)
- Existed: 1937–present

Major junctions
- West end: SR 65 / CR 100 near Jackson Center
- East end: US 33 in Russells Point

Location
- Country: United States
- State: Ohio
- Counties: Auglaize, Logan

Highway system
- Ohio State Highway System; Interstate; US; State; Scenic
← SR 719	→ SR 721

State Route 720 (SR 720) is an east–west state highway in the western portion of the U.S. state of Ohio. The highway runs from its western terminus at SR 65 approximately 3.75 miles (6.04 km) north of Jackson Center to its eastern terminus at US 33 in Russells Point.

SR 720 was designated in the late 1930s. The route traverses primarily farmland-dominated terrain in southeastern Auglaize County and northwestern Logan County as it connects SR 65 with the vicinity of the southwestern shore of Indian Lake.

== Route description ==
SR 720 begins at an unsignalized intersection with SR 65 and Auglaize County Road 100 (Santa Fe-New Knoxville Road) in southeastern Clay Township. The route heads due east for about 1.8 miles (2.9 km) before curving slightly to the southeast. At the Auglaize-Logan County line, SR 720 serves as the main road through the unincorporated community of Santa Fe. Now in Stokes Township, the route continues southeast and briefly parallels the Muchinippi Creek. At County Road 54, SR 720 makes a left turn heading due east again while CR 54 continues to parallel the creek. The route meets SR 235 (South Main Street) at a stop-controlled intersection on the border of Lakeview and Stokes Township. SR 720 heads through a small sliver of Lakeview before reentering Stokes Township. At the Stokes-Washington Township line, the route makes a quick jog to the south before heading east again and ending at an intersection with US 33 and Wilgus Street in the village of Russells Point. There are no traffic signals located on any part of the route. According to recent annual average daily traffic (AADT) counts from the Ohio Department of Transportation, the highest traffic count along the route was 1,230 vehicles on the segment between SR 235 and US 33 while the lowest counts were 330 vehicles in Auglaize and western Logan Counties. SR 720 is not incorporated as a component of the National Highway System, a system of routes considered to be most important for the nation's economy, mobility and defense.

== History ==
1937 marked the year in which SR 720 was designated as a part of the Ohio State Highway system. The highway was set along the same routing through southeastern Auglaize County and northwestern Logan County that it occupies to this day; no major changes have taken place to the routing since its inception.

== Major intersections ==
County	Location	mi	km	Destinations	Notes
Auglaize	Clay Township	0.00	0.00	SR 65 / CR 100 (Santa Fe-New Knoxville Road)	
Logan	Lakeview	6.93	11.15	SR 235 (South Main Street)	
Logan	Russells Point	8.20	13.20	US 33 / Wilgus Street	
1.000 mi = 1.609 km; 1.000 km = 0.621 mi
