= McColly Covered Bridge =

- U.S. National Register of Historic Places
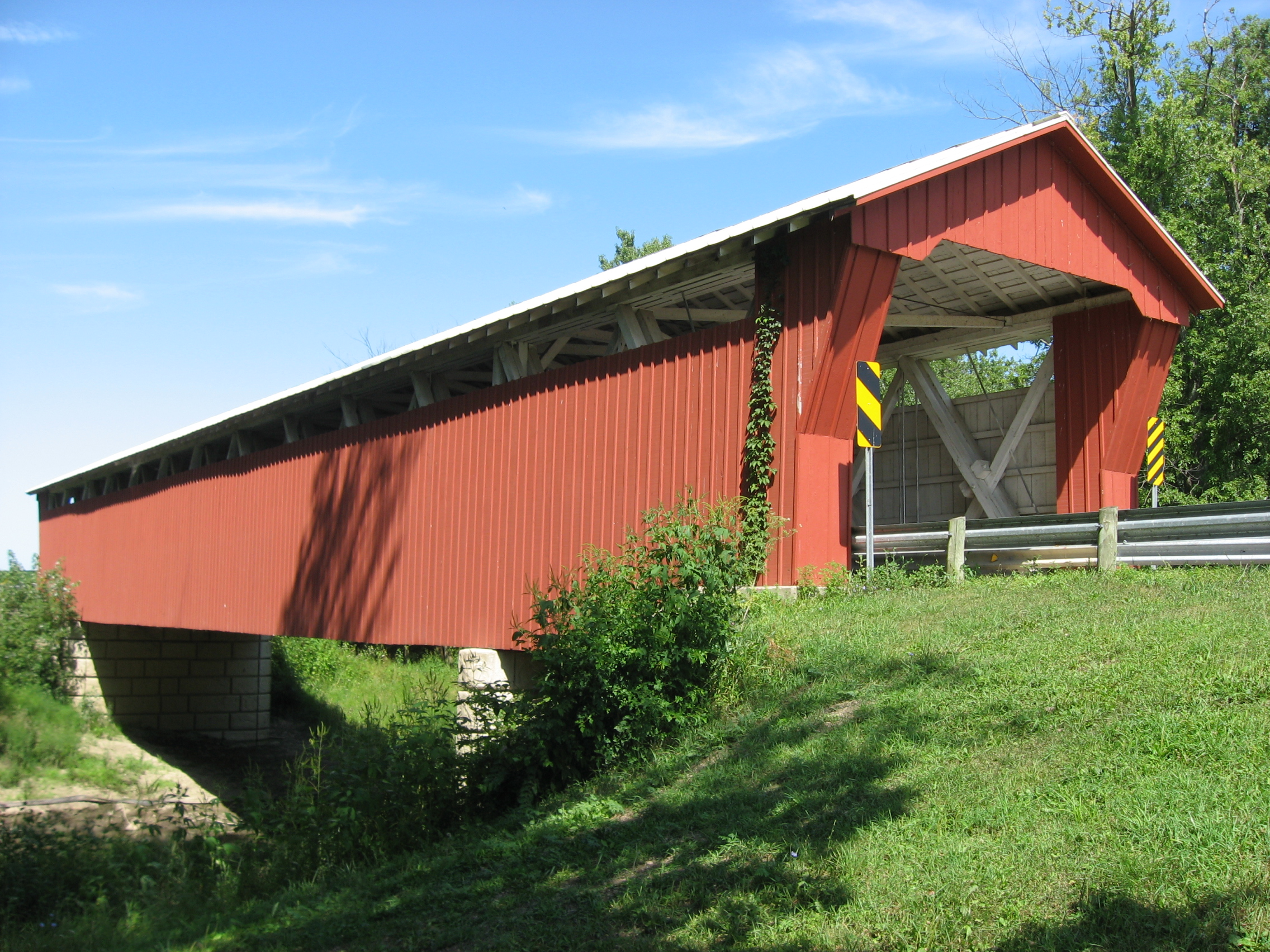
- Eastern end of the bridge

- Location within Ohio Location within the United States
- Location: County Road 13 southeast of Bloom Center in Washington Township, Logan County, Ohio
- Coordinates: 40°24′3″N 83°55′27″W
- Area: less than one acre
- Built: 1876
- Architect: Anderson Green Co.; T.B. Stillwell
- Architectural style: Howe truss covered bridge
- NRHP reference No.: 75001458
- Added to NRHP: May 28, 1975

The McColly Covered Bridge is a historic wooden covered bridge in western Logan County, Ohio, United States. Located in Washington Township near the community of Bloom Center, it is one of two remaining covered bridges in Logan County. It carries County Road 13 (formerly called the "Covered Bridge Pike") over the Great Miami River, approximately 5 miles (8.0 km) south of its source at Indian Lake.

The bridge was built in 1876 by the Anderson Green Company of Sidney, Ohio at a cost of $3,103 and named for nearby landowner Nicholas McColly. Although Anderson Green built many other bridges statewide, including another bridge in southwestern Logan County, it is the only remaining bridge built by the company in any location. It is approximately 142 feet (43 m) long, with a clearance of 16 feet (4.9 m) and a total width of 20 feet (6.1 m).

In 1974, the McColly Bridge was added to the National Register of Historic Places for its significance in Ohio's history. At that time, it was one of only eighteen remaining Howe truss bridges in Ohio. Although the nomination assessed its condition at "good," by the 1990s, the number of Howe truss bridges nearly fell to seventeen, as the McColly Bridge had deteriorated to the point that an engineering survey in 1996 pronounced it to be in imminent danger of collapse.

Restorations in 1943 and 1958 involved replacement of floorboards, strengthening of trusses, and raising the bridge to reduce the danger of flooding. Despite these repairs, the county closed the bridge in July 1993 due to structural deterioration from vandalism and recent floods. The 1996 engineering summary identified several serious faults: the bridge had tilted so that its portals were no longer square, many of the beams had rotted, a collision had damaged the interior, and nearly one-third of the bridge's siding had disappeared. In early 2000, the Amos B. Schwartz Construction Company of Geneva, Indiana was hired to repair the bridge, and it was reopened on November 14, 2000, ten months and over $690,000 after the commencement of repairs. The Ohio Department of Transportation and the Federal Highway Administration provided aid for this project and recognized it as "an outstanding example of preservation, rehabilitation and reuse of a historic bridge."
