= Washington Township, Logan County, Ohio =

Township in Ohio, US

- Township
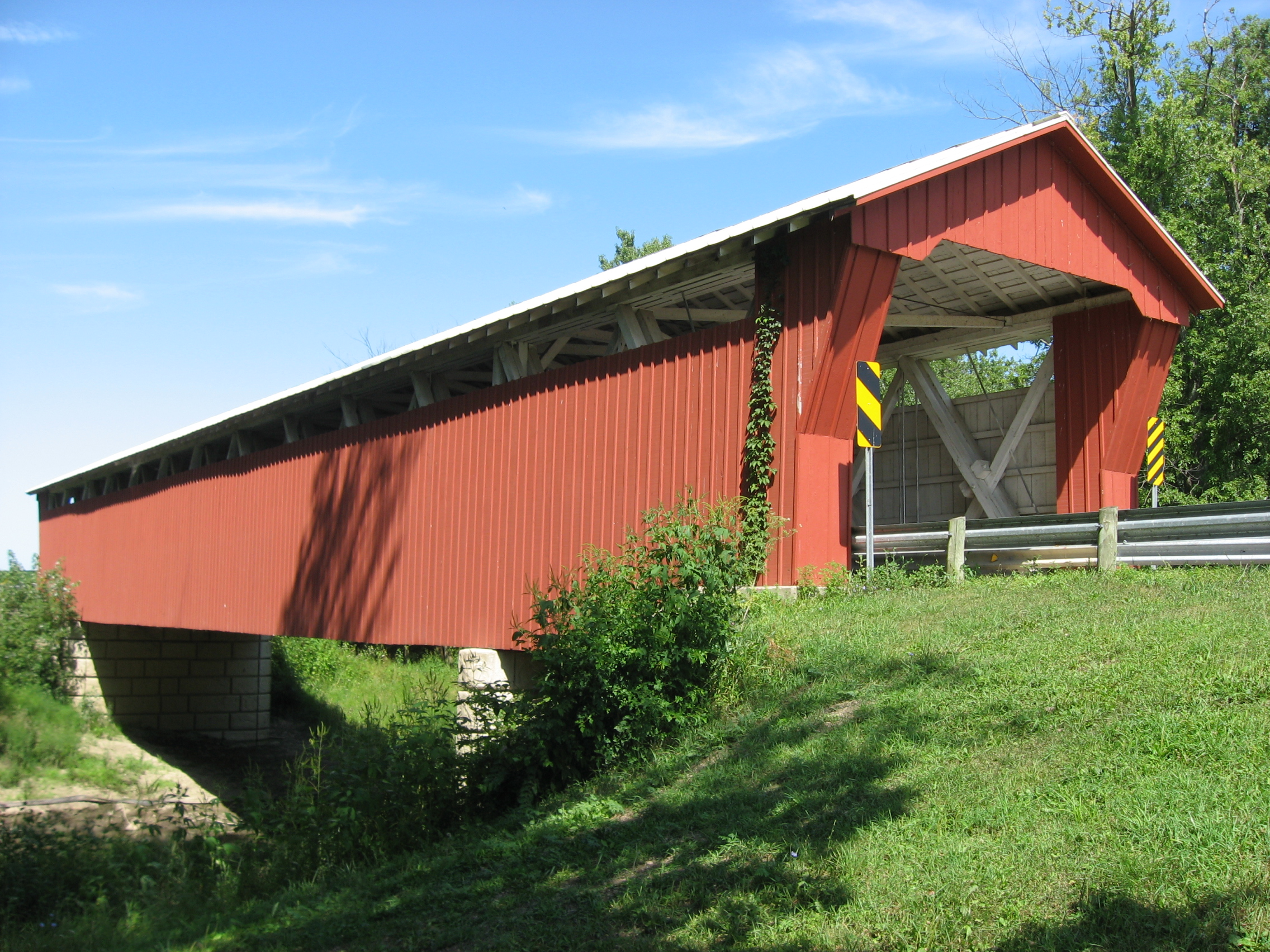
- McColly Covered Bridge

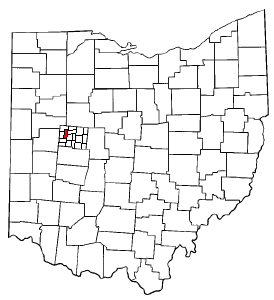
- Location of Washington Township in Ohio

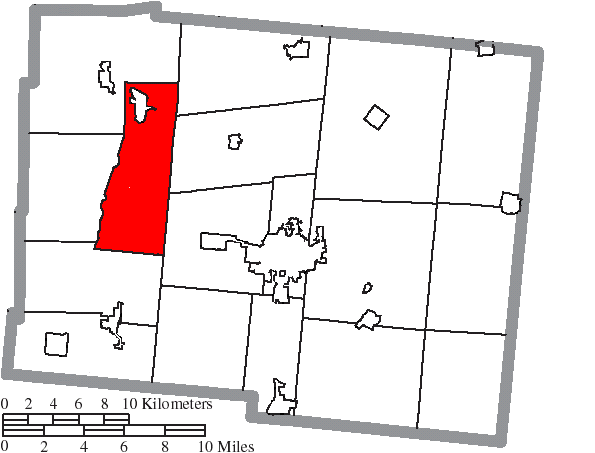
- Location of Washington Township in Logan County
- Coordinates: 40°27′45″N 83°53′35″W
- Country: United States
- State: Ohio
- County: Logan

Area
  - Total: 62.6 sq mi (162 km^{2})
  - Land: 59.1 sq mi (153 km^{2})
  - Water: 3.5 sq mi (9.1 km^{2})
- Elevation: 991 ft (302 m)

Population (2020)
  - Total: 3,351
  - Density: 56.7/sq mi (21.9/km^{2})
- Time zone: UTC-5 (Eastern (EST))
  - Summer (DST): UTC-4 (EDT)
- Area codes: 937, 326
- FIPS code: 39-81424
- GNIS feature ID: 1086496
- Website: www.washtwp.net

Washington Township is one of the seventeen townships of Logan County, Ohio, United States. As of the 2020 census, the population was 3,351.

== Geography ==
Located in the western part of the county, it borders the following townships:

- Richland Township - northeast
- McArthur Township - east
- Harrison Township - southeast
- Pleasant Township - south
- Bloomfield Township - west
- Stokes Township - northwest

The village of Russells Point is located in northern Washington Township, and the census-designated place of Lewistown lies in the township's center.

The southern part of Indian Lake is located in northern Washington Township.

== Name and history ==
Washington Township was organized in 1839. It is one of 43 Washington Townships statewide.

On the shores of Dunns Pond (in northern Washington Township) is a Native American mound, the Dunns Pond Mound, which was built at some point between 300 BC and AD 600. The mound is listed on the National Register of Historic Places.

== Government ==
The township is governed by a three-member board of trustees, who are elected in November of odd-numbered years to a four-year term beginning on the following January 1. Two are elected in the year after the presidential election and one is elected in the year before it. There is also an elected township fiscal officer, who serves a four-year term beginning on April 1 of the year after the election, which is held in November of the year before the presidential election. Vacancies in the fiscal officership or on the board of trustees are filled by the remaining trustees.

== Transportation ==
U.S. Route 33 is the most important highway in Washington Township. Other significant highways in Washington Township include State Routes 47, 235, 274, 366, 368, 708, and 720.
