= Ohio State Route 235 =

State highway in western Ohio, US

State Route 235

Route information
- Maintained by ODOT
- Length: 133.20 mi (214.36 km)
- Existed: 1926–present

Major junctions
- South end: US 68 near Xenia
- I-675 in Fairborn; I-70 / SR 4 in Huber Heights; US 40 near New Carlisle; US 36 in Saint Paris; US 33 in Lakeview; US 30 near Ada; I-75 near Mount Cory; US 224 / SR 15 near Benton Ridge; US 6 near Weston
- North end: SR 65 near Grand Rapids

Location
- Country: United States
- State: Ohio
- Counties: Greene, Montgomery, Clark, Champaign, Logan, Hardin, Hancock, Wood

Highway system
- Ohio State Highway System; Interstate; US; State; Scenic
← SR 234	→ SR 236
← SR 68	OH 69	→ I-70

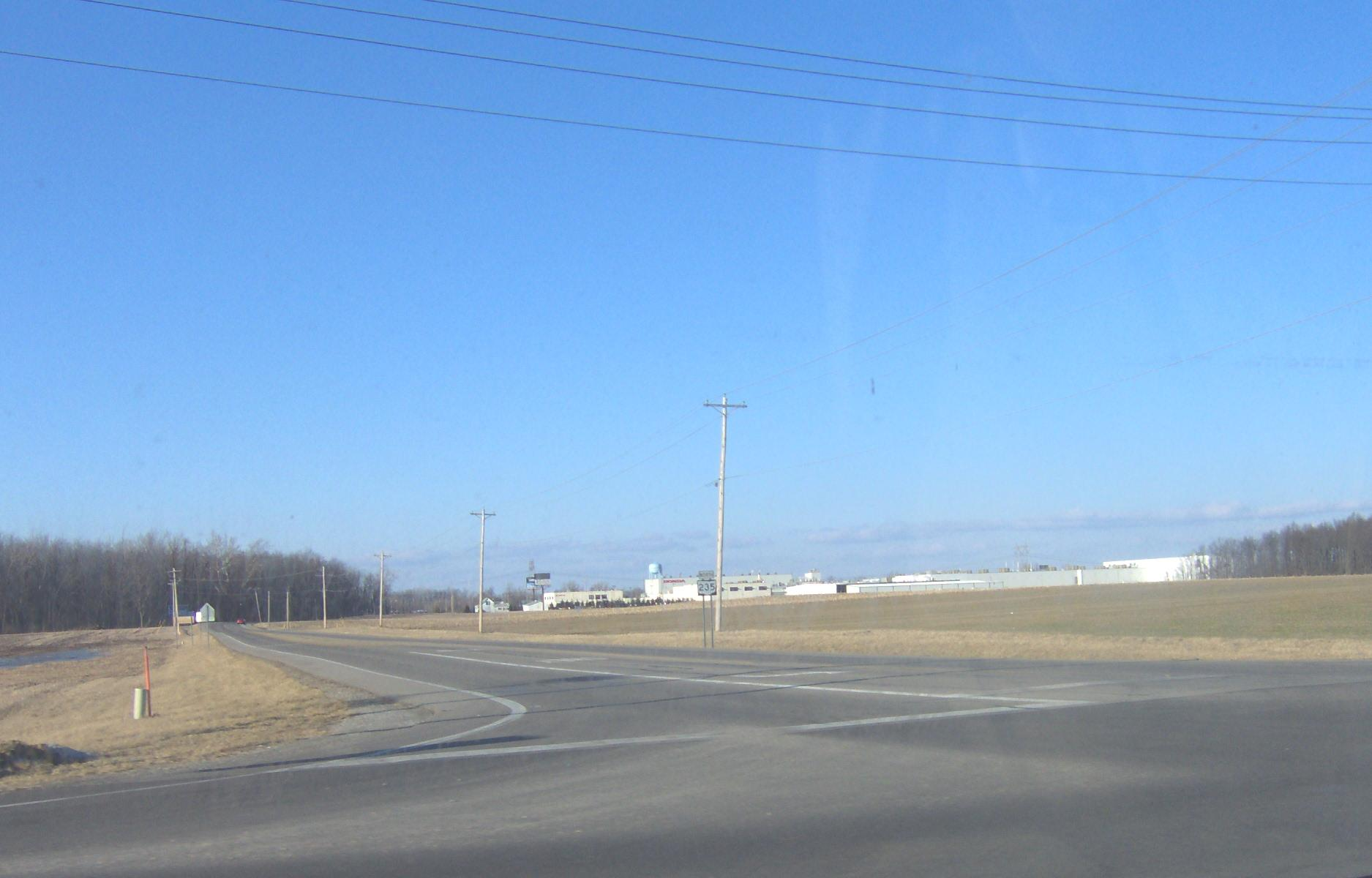
In Logan County, State Route 235 passes the Honda Transmission Factory near Russells Point.

State Route 235 (SR 235) is a 133.2-mile-long (214.4 km) north–south state highway in the western portion of the U.S. state of Ohio. Its southern terminus is at US 68 near the small town of Oldtown just north of Xenia, and its northern terminus is at State Route 65 at the Maumee River nearly 5 miles (8.0 km) east of Grand Rapids, west of Otsego.

Prior to late 1968, SR 235's northern terminus was at an intersection with State Route 4 and then State Route 69, which ran from downtown Dayton northward to State Route 65. With the reconstruction of SR 4/SR 69 to a high speed thoroughfare from I-75 to I-70, SR 69 southwards was discontinued, and northwards from the intersection was renumbered as an almost 200 mile northern extension of SR 235. According to the Ohio Department of Transportation District 7, this renumbering occurred because the number 69 has certain sexual meanings in popular culture, and the signs kept getting stolen.

== Route description ==
The portion of SR 235 within Fairborn is designated "Army Specialist Jesse Adam Snow Memorial Highway", in honor of a Fairborn High School graduate who was killed by enemy fire on November 14, 2010 in Afghanistan.

== History ==
- 1926 – Original route certified; originally routed along its current alignment from Oldtown to Fairborn (which was Fairfield and Osborn in 1926).
- March 9, 1932 – Extended north to State Route 4 approximately 3 miles (4.8 km) north of Fairborn along previously unnumbered road.
- 1969 – Extended north to its current terminus along previous State Route 69.

On November 9, 2012, the Clark County-Springfield Transportation Coordinating Committee announced that a roundabout would be constructed at the intersection of SR 235 and SR 41 in Pike Township, which has been the site of numerous vehicle crashes, including five fatalities from 1992 to 2013. Construction on the $1.1 million project began in June 2014 and was completed the weekend before Monday, September 15. It is the first roundabout in Clark County and is believed to be the first in Ohio with all approaches at high speed, 55 mph (89 km/h).

In summer 2020, ODOT made plans to convert the intersection with US 68, SR 235's southern terminus, to a roundabout, near Oldtown in Xenia Township, Greene County, almost four miles (6.4 km) north of downtown Xenia. Construction was expected to begin in spring 2023 and to be completed that fall, with an estimated cost of $2 million. However, site preparations did not begin until early June 2024, and it was announced that construction would begin on July 16, at a cost of $2.29 million, to be completed by the fall. On December 3, 2024, the roundabout was substantially completed except for minor finish work such as landscaping, which is scheduled to be done in spring 2025.

=== State Route 69 before 1969 ===
- 1923 – Originally routed from Dayton to Forest.
- 1938 – Extended north to McComb along previously unnumbered road, from McComb to Hoytville along the previous alignment of State Route 186, and from Hoytville to 5 miles (8.0 km) east of Grand Rapids along a previously unnumbered road.

== Future ==
The Ohio Department of Transportation (ODOT) and the Clark County-Springfield Transportation Coordinating Committee have conducted a SR 235 Corridor Management Study, examining improvements to SR 235 in Bethel Township, between US 40 to the north, and the Greene County line to the south. The study primarily covered the Park Layne section of the township. The study area has had many vehicle crashes and four pedestrian fatalities between 2007 and 2010. The road has many closely spaced commercial driveways and lacks crosswalks, among other problems. Proposed changes included a raised median with breaks only at a few major cross streets, consolidated driveways limited to right-in/right-out access, and jughandles or U-turns at each end of the corridor for turnarounds. Other proposals included U-turns at the busiest cross street, Styer Drive, roundabouts at the major cross streets and "backage" roads. Public meetings related to this study were held in September 2011 and April 2012. The projected cost of the improvements ranged from $7.4 million to $12.2 million and construction was not expected to begin until 2017 to 2020. In mid-October 2012, it was decided by the Ohio Department of Transportation and Clark County officials to make about $3 million in improvements to this stretch of SR 235, including the consolidation of driveways and the construction of cul-de-sacs. Construction is expected to begin in 2015. The development of any "backage" roads will be left to future private developers.

== Major intersections ==
County	Location	mi	km	Destinations	Notes
Greene	Xenia Township	0.00	0.00	US 68	Roundabout
Greene	Fairborn	6.63– 6.93	10.67– 11.15	I-675 – Columbus, Cincinnati	Exit 22 (I-675)
Greene	Fairborn	8.30	13.36	SR 444 south (Broad Street) / Xenia Road	Southern end of SR 444 concurrency
Greene	Fairborn	8.96	14.42	SR 444 north (Broad Street) / North Central Avenue	Northern end of SR 444 concurrency
Montgomery	Huber Heights	11.66	18.76	SR 4 south / Chambersburg Road – Dayton	Interchange; southern end of SR 4 concurrency
Montgomery	Huber Heights	12.81– 13.20	20.62– 21.24	I-70 north / SR 4 – Columbus, Indianapolis	Exit 41 (I-70); northern end of SR 4 concurrency
Clark	Bethel Township	16.24	26.14	US 40 (National Road) – Vandalia, Springfield	
Clark	New Carlisle	18.31	29.47	SR 571 (Jefferson Street)	
Clark	Pike Township	22.71	36.55	SR 41 – Springfield, Troy	Roundabout
Champaign	Jackson Township	27.18	43.74	SR 55 – Urbana, Christiansburg, Troy	
Champaign	Johnson Township	32.28	51.95	US 36 – St. Paris, Urbana, Piqua	
Champaign	Adams Township	37.97	61.11	SR 29 west – Sidney	Southern end of SR 29 concurrency
Champaign	Adams Township	38.28	61.61	SR 29 east – Rosewood, Urbana	Northern end of SR 29 concurrency
Logan	Miami Township	42.85	68.96	SR 706 west – Sidney	Eastern terminus of SR 706
Logan	De Graff	47.14	75.86	SR 508 east (Main Street)	Western terminus of SR 508
Logan	Pleasant Township	49.99	80.45	SR 47 – Bellefontaine, Sidney	
Logan	Washington Township	56.20	90.45	SR 274 – Jackson Center, Huntsville	
Logan	Washington Township	56.98	91.70	SR 708 north – Russells Point	Southern terminus of SR 708
Logan	Stokes Township–Lakeview municipal line	59.27	95.39	SR 720	
Logan	Lakeview	59.86	96.34	US 33	
Logan	Stokes Township–Lakeview municipal line	59.89	96.38	SR 366 east	Southern end of SR 366 concurrency
Logan	Stokes Township	61.43	98.86	SR 365 east	Western terminus of SR 365
Logan	Stokes Township	61.96– 62.00	99.71– 99.78	SR 366 west	Northern end of SR 366 concurrency
Hardin	Roundhead Township	66.73	107.39	SR 117 south	Southern end of SR 117 concurrency
Hardin	Roundhead Township	68.68	110.53	SR 117 north to SR 385 / Township Road 39	Northern end of SR 117 concurrency
Hardin	Roundhead Township	70.69	113.76	SR 67 – Waynesfield, Kenton	
Hardin	Marion–Liberty township line	81.28	130.81	SR 309 west – Lima	Southern end of SR 309 concurrency
Hardin	Marion–Liberty township line	82.28	132.42	SR 309 east – Kenton	Northern end of SR 309 concurrency
Hardin	Ada	85.31	137.29	SR 81 (North Avenue)	
Hancock	Orange Township	88.73– 88.89	142.80– 143.05	US 30 – Mansfield, Fort Wayne, IN	Interchange
Hancock	Orange Township	93.28	150.12	SR 103 – Bluffton, Arlington	
Hancock	Union Township	94.70– 94.95	152.40– 152.81	I-75 – Toledo, Dayton	Exit 145 (I-75)
Hancock	Union Township	100.06	161.03	SR 12 west – Pandora	Southern end of SR 12 concurrency
Hancock	Benton Ridge	102.32	164.67	SR 12 east – Findlay	Northern end of SR 12 concurrency
Hancock	Blanchard Township	105.58	169.91	US 224 / SR 15 – Findlay, Ottawa	
Hancock	Pleasant Township	108.99	175.40	SR 186 south / CR 97	Southern end of SR 186 concurrency
Hancock	McComb	109.98	177.00	SR 613 (Main Street) / SR 186 ends	Northern end of SR 186 concurrency (northern terminus)
Wood	Hoytville	115.17	185.35	SR 18 east / Riegle Road	Southern end of SR 18 concurrency
Wood	Jackson Township	116.58	187.62	SR 18 west – Deshler, Hamler	Northern end of SR 18 concurrency
Wood	Milton Township	122.15	196.58	SR 281 – Custar, Wayne	
Wood	Weston Township	128.19	206.30	US 6 – Bowling Green, McClure, Napoleon	
Wood	Washington Township	133.20	214.36	SR 65 (River Road) – Grand Rapids, Perrysburg, Toledo	
1.000 mi = 1.609 km; 1.000 km = 0.621 mi: Concurrency terminus
