= Lillian Brown =

American radio and television producer (1914–2020)

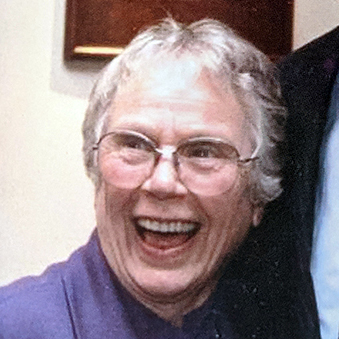
- Born: August 8, 1914; McArthur Township, Ohio, US
- Died: September 13, 2020 (aged 106); McLean, Virginia, US

Mary Lillian Josephine Brown (née Brooks; August 8, 1914 – September 13, 2020) was an American radio and television producer, university administrator and instructor, author, makeup artist and image consultant. She provided makeup and image services to nine Presidents of the United States from Dwight Eisenhower to Bill Clinton, and to Martin Luther King Jr.

== Early years ==
Brooks was born in 1914 on a farm near Huntsville, Ohio. Her father was a farmer and her mother a schoolteacher. After receiving a two-year teaching degree from Bowling Green State College in 1933, she taught first, second and third graders at the same school as her mother. She did graduate work at Ohio State University and worked at a department store in Cleveland. She married George Brown, a Navy pilot, in 1941. They had three children, Carla, Kristi, and Kimi.

== Professional career ==
=== Television career ===
In 1952, Brown and her husband settled in Washington, D.C. They attended the same church as President Dwight Eisenhower. In 1953, she developed an educational television series about presidents and their churches. She later developed a second program on the mansions of Virginia. She also hosted an educational program, Do You Wonder? For her work in television she was given a Golden Mike Award in 1960 by McCall's magazine and the Alliance for Women in Media.

=== Academic career ===
In 1956, she was hired as the director of radio and television at George Washington University's public relations office, a post she held until 1966. At George Washington, she also developed and taught one of the first college courses on television.

In 1966, she left George Washington for a similar post at American University. She remained at that school until 1976. While at American University, she helped create and serve as curator of the National Television Library.

She joined Georgetown University as its television coordinator in 1976. At Georgetown, she also taught a class in public speaking.

Brown was an author whose works included Your Public Best (1989), The Polished Politician (1994), and Speaking to Be Understood (2003). She hosted radio talk shows on National Public Radio and Armed Forces Radio.

=== Makeup and image consulting ===
In the 1950s, Brown's show, Do You Wonder?, was made at the same studio as Face the Nation. The producer of Face the Nation noticed Brown's skill at applying makeup to her guests and hired her to do makeup for that show as well. She famously persuaded a reluctant Sam Rayburn to allow her to apply makeup by promising, "Mr. Sam, if you let me powder your nose, I will not relieve you of your manhood." She continued doing makeup work for CBS News's Washington bureau for approximately 40 years.

Brown was not trained as a cosmetologist, but learned from her early work on television. She recalled that the studio lights were brutally hot, and she developed techniques to control sweating.

She developed a relationship with John F. Kennedy while he was still a Senator. Brown recalled that Kennedy was interested in "every little detail" about how he came across on television and "what cameras and lights and lenses did to him." She advised Kennedy to apply makeup on the first presidential debate that was televised in 1960. When Kennedy became president, she continued to work with him and Jackie Kennedy. She applied the First Lady's makeup for her appearance on A Tour of the White House with Mrs. John F. Kennedy (1962).

Vice President Richard Nixon's lack of suitable makeup for his 1960 debate with Kennedy created a demand for makeup experts in Washington, and Brown filled that role. In 1967, she advised President Lyndon B. Johnson to let his hair grow longer and grow sideburns to provide "more of a frame around his face."

As her reputation grew, she provided makeup and image services to many Congressional leaders and nine U.S. Presidents from Eisenhower to Bill Clinton. Others included Eleanor Roosevelt, Martin Luther King Jr., Walter Cronkite, Eric Sevareid, Margaret Chase Smith, and Columbia University president Grayson Kirk.

In 1974, she helped President Richard Nixon prepare for his address to the nation in which he resigned the Presidency. She recalled that he was sobbing and causing his makeup to run. She broke the sullen mood by reminding Nixon of the time when the two of them got locked into a White House bathroom with Nixon's dog and had to be rescued by the Secret Service, eliciting the President's laughter.

She worked with Speaker of the House Carl Albert, helping to reduce his Oklahoma accent. She recalled his instruction, "Just take out half the Bugtussle," as he had to go back to Oklahoma to get elected every two years.

During the Clinton administration, she did Hillary Clinton's makeup for her 1993 appearance on the cover of Time magazine.

== Later years ==
Brown continued teaching speech and elocution until age 95. She taught the course "Speaking to Be Understood: English as a First or Second Language" to graduate students at Georgetown's school of law, medicine, foreign service, and business. She died in 2020 at age 106 after suffering a stroke at her home in McLean, Virginia.
