= O'Connor's Landing =

Defunct family lakeside resort in Ohio

Coordinates: 40°29′48″N 83°51′12″W

O'Connor's Landing was a family lakeside resort in Logan County, Ohio, United States, on the shores of Indian Lake. It was one of twenty-one hotels and cottage resorts listed in the 1911 travel atlas for the area. Indian Lake is formed by two forks of the Great Miami River and it resided at the confluence of the north and south forks. For the better part of the twentieth century, families came to visit and stay at the 30 cottages and 8-room hotel. The main building included a general store which provided bait, groceries, boat rentals and souvenirs. There was a restaurant located along the water for lakefront dining. It flourished until June 15, 1985, when it was destroyed by a fire. It was the last family style resort remaining on Indian Lake of the initial twenty one.

== History ==
The resort was established in 1904 by John and Tom O'Connor on the east side of Indian Lake. It was built on the northwest portion of the family farm.

== The Cottages ==
The original nine cottages on the western shoreline faced the larger part of the lake which provided sunset views. The largest cottage was Number 3 and the smallest was Number 8. Cottage number 4 was the original home of Joseph and Margaret Cain, who became the first proprietors of the general store. Number 8 was also referred to a "the fisherman's cabin" and was moved to its lakeside location after being purchased for $25. These original cottages were supplied with coal oil stoves and ice boxes. Cottages numbers 10-15 were not located on the water. Numbers ten through twelve were all relocated farm housed from various nearby locations that were purchased and moved into place. Cottage number 10 sufficed as the general store after the fire for a few years. Cottage 13 was renamed "Mir-a-Mar" after the Daytona Beach resort visited by Tom O'Connor (son of John O'Connor referenced above) in 1944. The number 13 was not used so the superstitious would not be deterred from renting the unit. Cottages fourteen and fifteen were originally built as a single livery stable for horses visitors who arrived by horse and buggy. In 1929, cottages 16–20 were added. Stone was brought from Northwood Quarry via Ford Model T trucks. Cottage #17 was initially located along the western shoreline, but was moved to its location beside the marina. A well was drilled near the front step of cottage 20 and an electric pump was installed to supply drinking water to the sink and lavatory. The last expansion phase of cottages added numbers 21 through 30 in 1949. They were placed in a fashion that hugged the lawn and lake in front of them, where a playground would be located. Each was constructed with cinder block and number 30 had hardwood flooring. These 10 cottages cost $48,000 to build and in the summer of 1950, began renting for $60/week. Cottage number 20 is the lone remaining O'Connor's Landing cottage and is privately owned.

== The Lodge ==
The Lodge was built in 1908 with seven sleeping rooms. In 1914, a two-story section of the grocery was built with three rooms above for the use of those operating the business. In 1929, two rooms were added behind the grocery where bathers checked their clothes in baskets and rented swimming clothes. However, these were subsequently torn down in 1933 and an office was added. In 1930, three booths were placed along the front windows for soda pop, sandwiches, and near-beer. Slot machines lined the front porch a few years, until a new sheriff was elected who disapproved of them. In 1952, the upstairs was renovated into four bedrooms, and added to the west end of the building were two upstairs and two downstairs rooms. A west dining room was added after the Department of Education from Columbus, Ohio needed a place for meetings. Two minnow pools were located near the pump house that supplied water to the East cottages. The minnows were eventually moved to a small room on the marina side of the general store and kept in old electric soda pop coolers along with 6 horse motors for the boat rentals. Around 1976, the daily operations were assumed by Tom O'Connor, Jr. and the Lodge evolved into a robust area restaurant with a well known Friday night seafood buffet and a Sunday morning breakfast buffet. Broasted chicken was the most famous draw. A lighthouse and expanded dining was added in the winter of 1984 and 1985. The lodge burned down on June 14, 1985. The large oak trees remain and are the constant as they were there before, during, and now after the lodge.

== Activities ==
Many recall the swimming near the point at O'Connor's Landing. A gazebo and dock provided the initial ambiance, and a large slide was later added. At its peak, 14 ft. boat rentals with 6 horse motors were rented, along with canoes, a pontoon, and a paddle boat. There were two playgrounds with large swing sets, tether ball, and a large swing known as the "popsicle stick". There was also a tennis court, a roofed picnic shelter and large grassy areas for picnics or a toss of the ball.
