= Ohio State Route 366 =

State highway in Logan County, Ohio, US

State Route 366

Route information
- Maintained by ODOT
- Length: 9.78 mi (15.74 km)
- Existed: 1934–present

Major junctions
- West end: US 33 near Lakeview
- East end: SR 117 near Huntsville

Location
- Country: United States
- State: Ohio
- Counties: Logan

Highway system
- Ohio State Highway System; Interstate; US; State; Scenic
| ← SR 365 | → SR 367 |

State Route 366 (SR 366) is an east–west state highway in the western portion of the U.S. state of Ohio. SR 366 has its western terminus at a T-intersection with U.S. Route 33 (US 33) nearly 1.50 miles (2.41 km) northwest of Lakeview. The route's eastern terminus is at State Route 117 about 1.50 miles (2.41 km) north of Huntsville. SR 366 runs along the western and southern edge of Indian Lake and provides access to homes and recreational facilities along the lake shoreline. SR 366 was designated in 1939, and was extended in 1961.

== Route description ==
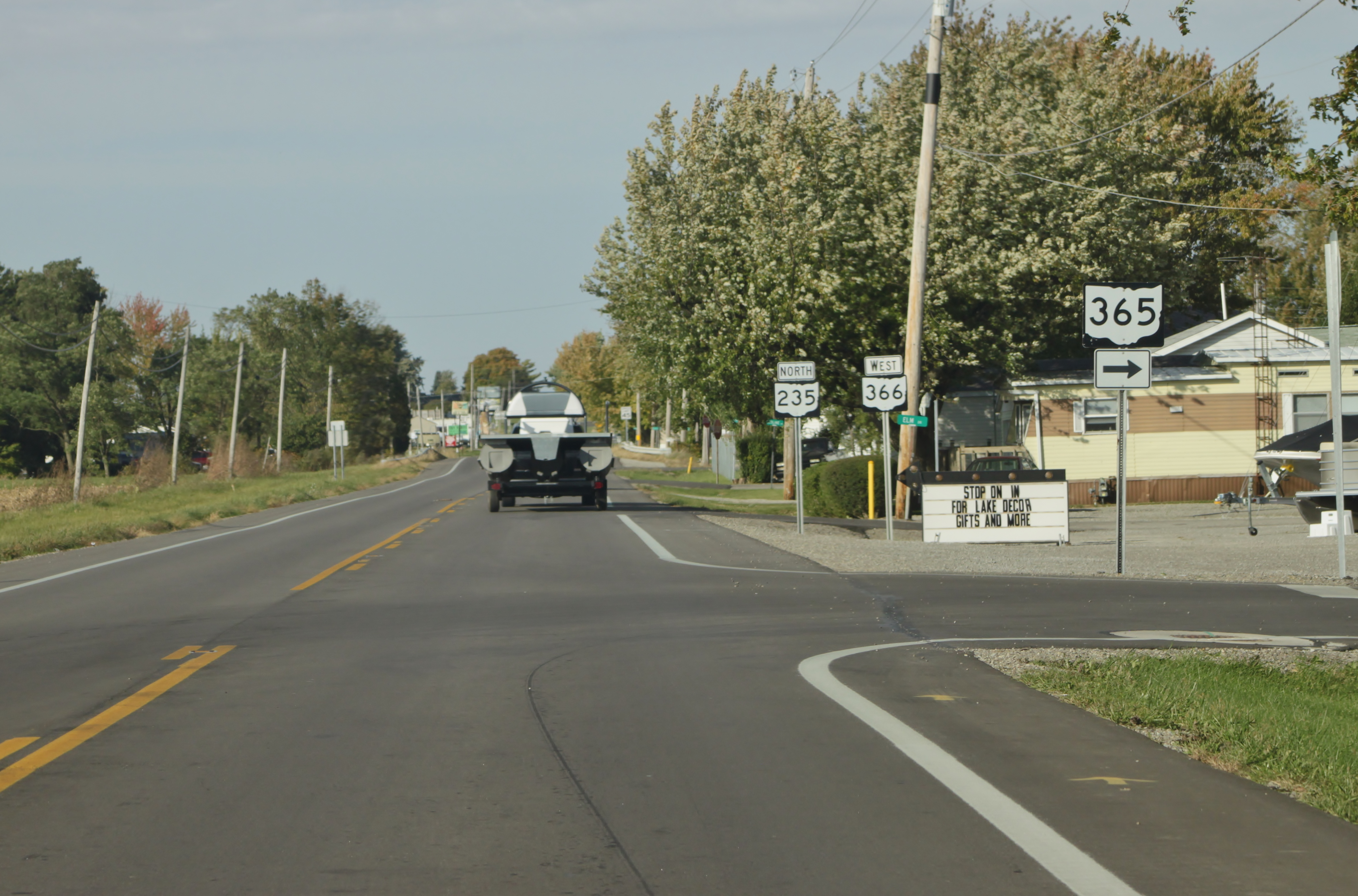
SR 366 and SR 235 on the west side of Indian Lake, approaching a junction with SR 365

The entirety of SR 366 is located within the northwestern quadrant of Logan County. This state highway is not a part of the National Highway System, a network of routes deemed to be most important for the economy, mobility and defense of the nation.

SR 366 starts at US 33 at a T intersection, north of Lakeview. It moves east, meets SR 235, and becomes concurrent one mile later. SR 235/366 moves south and intersects SR 365 half a mile later. The concurrency parallels the shore of Indian Lake until SR 235 splits off in Lakeview. Continuing to parallel the shore, SR 366 turns east near US 33. After a bit more than one mile, SR 366 enters Russells Point, and it intersects SR 708 as it heads southeast. In downtown Russells Point, SR 366 is only few yards from US 33. Later, SR 366 leaves Russells Point and intersects SR 368, who provides access to islands in the lake. The route continues east, and then moves south on a ramp to SR 117 south, the terminus of SR 366. SR 366D provides access to SR 117 north and an alternative to SR 366's terminus.

== History ==
The SR 366 designation was assigned in 1934. The original routing of SR 366 consisted only of the current stretch of the highway between what was originally designated SR 32 (now US 33) and what was then designated as SR 69 (now SR 235) north of Lakeview. At that time, the remainder of the current SR 366 consisted of SR 69 and US 33. By 1961, a new two-lane alignment of US 33 was established through Lakeview, Russells Point and to the southeast. Consequently, SR 366 took on the shape that it has today by being extended via a concurrency with SR 69 south into Lakeview, and the former routing of US 33 along the south shore of Indian Lake from that point east to its current eastern terminus at SR 117. Later in 1979, SR 368 was truncated from SR 117 to SR 366, leaving SR 366 the only route between those two highways.

== Major intersections ==
The entire route is in Logan County.

| Location | mi | km | Destinations | Notes |
|---|---|---|---|---|
| Stokes Township | 0.00 | 0.00 | US 33 | |
| Stokes Township | 0.91 | 1.46 | SR 235 north | Western terminus of SR 235 concurrency |
| Stokes Township | 1.44 | 2.32 | SR 365 east | Western terminus of SR 365 |
| Stokes Township | 2.98 | 4.80 | SR 235 south to US 33 | Eastern terminus of SR 235 concurrency |
| Russells Point | 5.10 | 8.21 | SR 708 | |
| Richland Township | 7.08 | 11.39 | SR 368 north | Southern terminus of SR 368 |
| Richland Township | 9.40 | 15.13 | SR 366D | Directional alternate of SR 366 |
| Richland Township | 9.78 | 15.74 | SR 117 / SR 366D | |
1.000 mi = 1.609 km; 1.000 km = 0.621 mi: Concurrency terminus
