= Stokes Township, Logan County, Ohio =

Township in Ohio, US

- Township
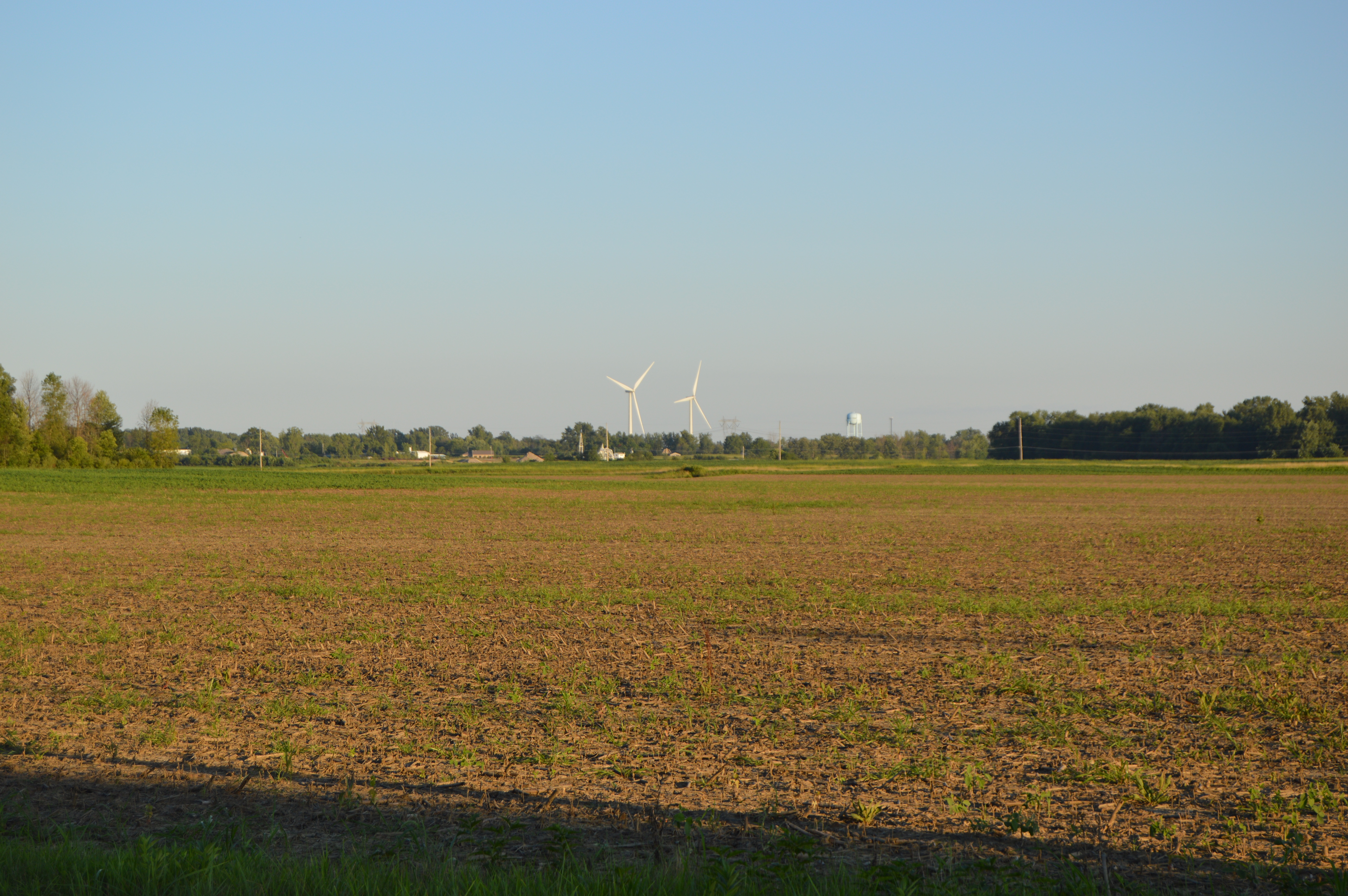
- Fields south of Lakeview

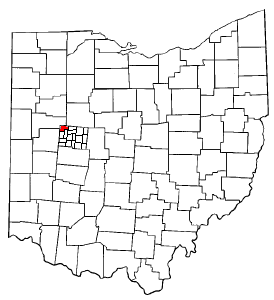
- Location of Stokes Township in Ohio

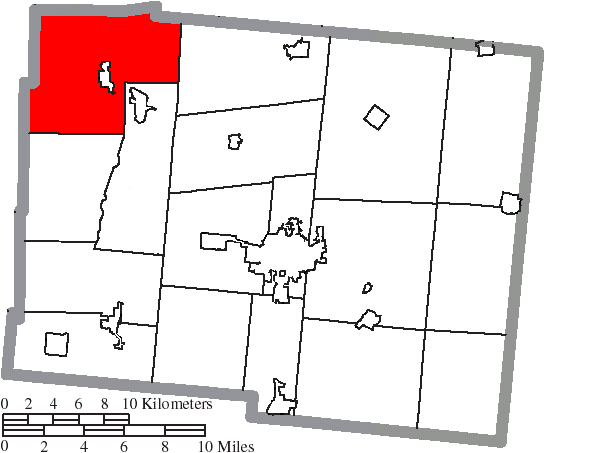
- Location of Stokes Township in Logan County
- Coordinates: 40°30′28″N 83°54′25″W
- Country: United States
- State: Ohio
- County: Logan

Area
  - Total: 38.2 sq mi (99.0 km^{2})
  - Land: 32.6 sq mi (84.4 km^{2})
  - Water: 5.6 sq mi (14.6 km^{2})
- Elevation: 991 ft (302 m)

Population (2020)
  - Total: 4,550
  - Density: 140/sq mi (53.9/km^{2})
- Time zone: UTC-5 (Eastern (EST))
  - Summer (DST): UTC-4 (EDT)
- Area codes: 937, 326
- FIPS code: 39-74780
- GNIS feature ID: 1086494
- Website: www.stokestownship.com

Stokes Township is one of the seventeen townships of Logan County, Ohio, United States. As of the 2020 census, the population was 4,550.

== Geography ==
Located in the northwestern corner of the county, it borders the following townships:

- Goshen Township, Auglaize County - north
- Roundhead Township, Hardin County - northeast
- Richland Township - east
- Washington Township - southeast
- Bloomfield Township - south
- Jackson Township, Shelby County - southwest
- Clay Township, Auglaize County - northwest

The village of Lakeview is located in eastern Stokes Township, and the unincorporated community of Santa Fe lies in the southwestern part of the county, along the Clay Township border. The census-designated place of Chippewa Park lies in the northeast of the township.

A significant portion of eastern Stokes Township is occupied by Indian Lake.

== Name and history ==
Stokes Township was organized in 1838. Statewide, the only other Stokes Township is in Madison County.

The township was involved in one of the last county border changes in Ohio. This change occurred in 1888 when part of Stokes Township was exchanged with Clay Township in Auglaize County for part of that county's Goshen Township.

== Government ==
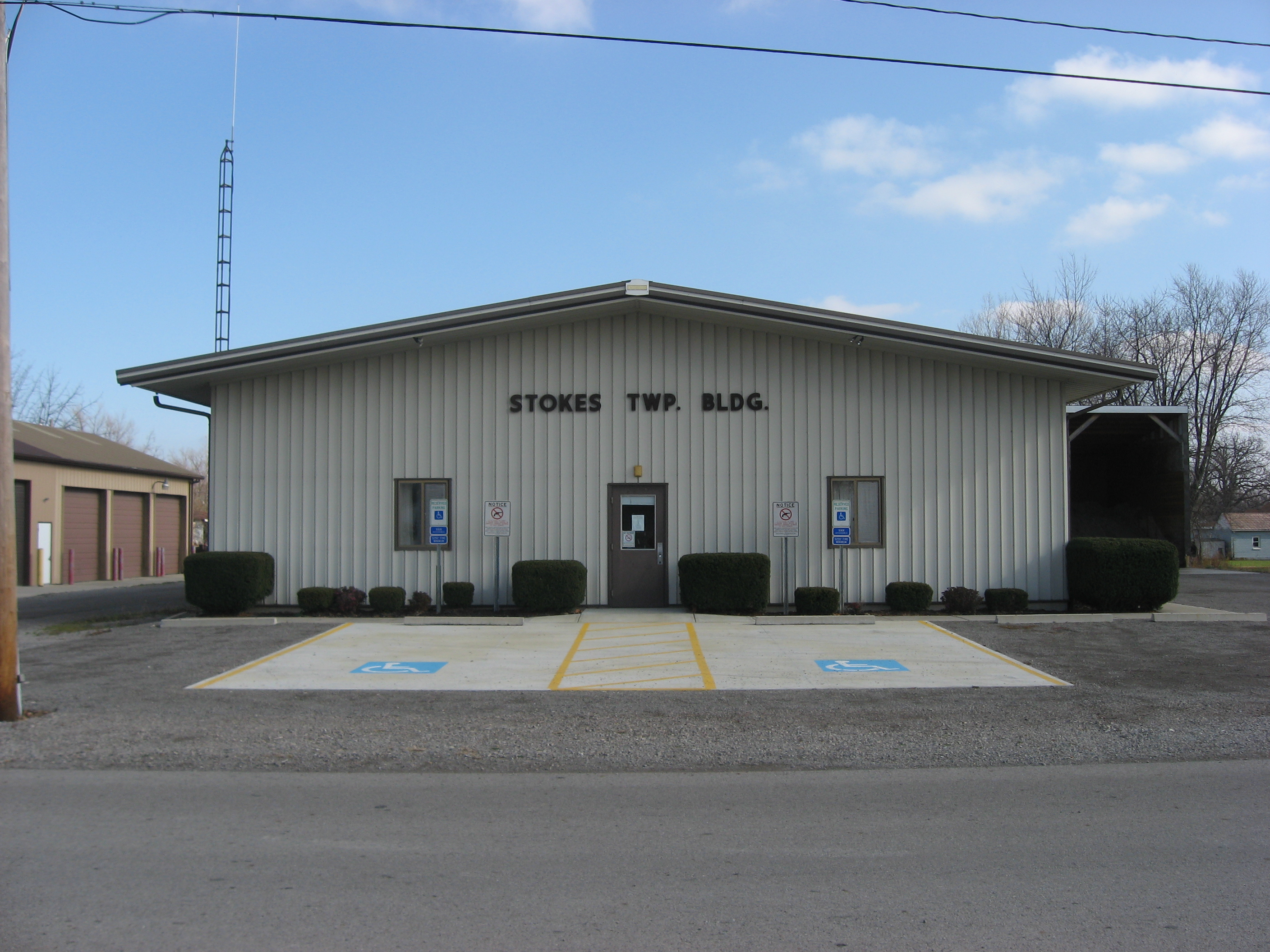
Stokes Township hall

The township is governed by a three-member board of trustees, who are elected in November of odd-numbered years to a four-year term beginning on the following January 1. Two are elected in the year after the presidential election and one is elected in the year before it. There is also an elected township fiscal officer, who serves a four-year term beginning on April 1 of the year after the election, which is held in November of the year before the presidential election. Vacancies in the fiscal officership or on the board of trustees are filled by the remaining trustees.

== Transportation ==
U.S. Route 33 is the most important highway in Stokes Township. Other significant highways include State Routes 235, 365, 366, 368, and 720.
