= Huntsville, Ohio =

- Village
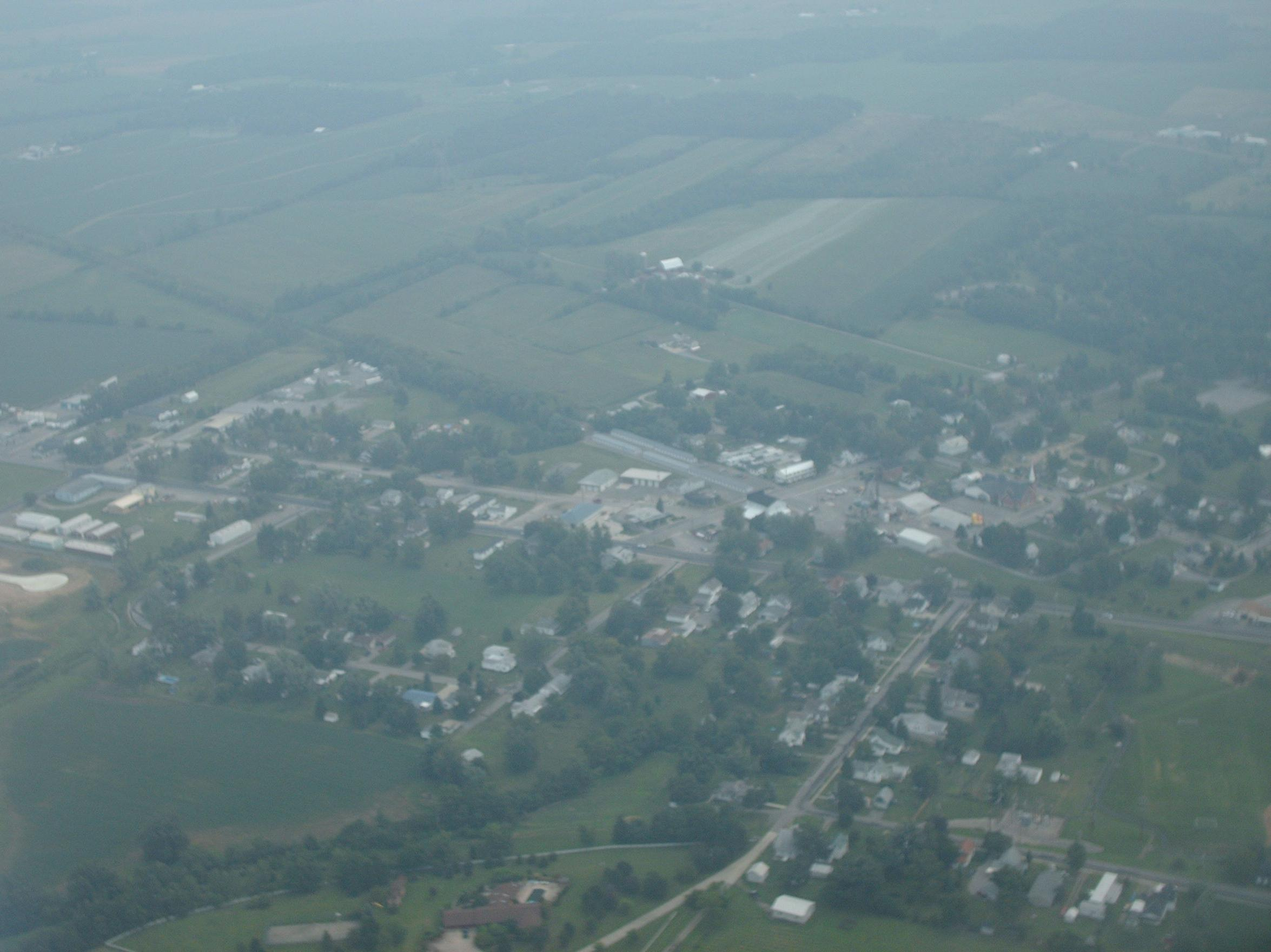
- Aerial view of Huntsville

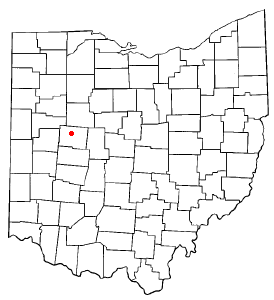
- Location of Huntsville, Ohio

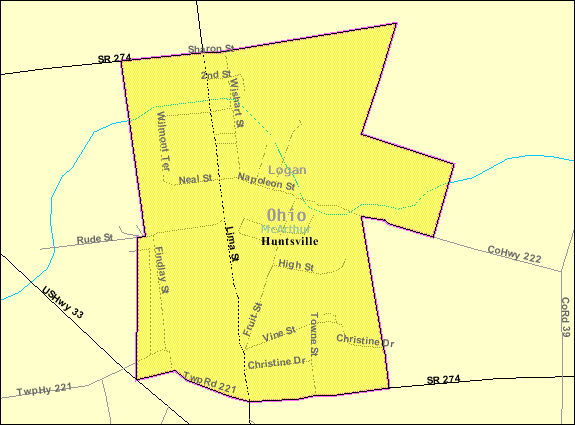
- Detailed map of Huntsville
- Coordinates: 40°26′32″N 83°48′16″W
- Country: United States
- State: Ohio
- County: Logan
- Township: McArthur

Area
  - Total: 0.30 sq mi (0.78 km^{2})
  - Land: 0.30 sq mi (0.78 km^{2})
  - Water: 0 sq mi (0.00 km^{2})
- Elevation: 1,076 ft (328 m)

Population (2020)
  - Total: 408
  - Density: 1,348.3/sq mi (520.59/km^{2})
- Time zone: UTC-5 (Eastern (EST))
  - Summer (DST): UTC-4 (EDT)
- ZIP code: 43324
- Area codes: 937, 326
- FIPS code: 39-36988
- GNIS feature ID: 2398564
- Website: https://huntsvilleohio.net/

Huntsville is a village in Logan County, Ohio, United States. The population was 408 at the 2020 census.

== History ==
Huntsville was platted in 1846, and named after Aaron L. Hunt, a government surveyor. The village was incorporated in December 1865.

== Geography ==
According to the United States Census Bureau, the village has a total area of 0.30 square miles (0.78 km^{2}), all of it land.

== Demographics ==
Historical population
Census	Pop.	Note	%±
1850	214		—
1860	281		31.3%
1870	322		14.6%
1880	420		30.4%
1890	500		19.0%
1900	408		−18.4%
1910	328		−19.6%
1920	339		3.4%
1930	398		17.4%
1940	353		−11.3%
1950	408		15.6%
1960	511		25.2%
1970	475		−7.0%
1980	489		2.9%
1990	343		−29.9%
2000	454		32.4%
2010	431		−5.1%
2020	408		−5.3%
U.S. Decennial Census

=== 2010 census ===
As of the census of 2010, there were 431 people, 159 households, and 123 families living in the village. The population density was 1,436.7 inhabitants per square mile (554.7/km^{2}). There were 189 housing units at an average density of 630.0 per square mile (243.2/km^{2}). The racial makeup of the village was 98.4% White, 0.5% African American, 0.5% from other races, and 0.7% from two or more races. Hispanic or Latino of any race were 0.9% of the population.

There were 159 households, of which 42.1% had children under the age of 18 living with them, 60.4% were married couples living together, 11.3% had a female householder with no husband present, 5.7% had a male householder with no wife present, and 22.6% were non-families. 20.8% of all households were made up of individuals, and 7.6% had someone living alone who was 65 years of age or older. The average household size was 2.71 and the average family size was 3.02.

The median age in the village was 35.6 years. 30.9% of residents were under the age of 18; 8.2% were between the ages of 18 and 24; 26.2% were from 25 to 44; 20.9% were from 45 to 64; and 13.9% were 65 years of age or older. The gender makeup of the village was 48.3% male and 51.7% female.

=== 2000 census ===
As of the census of 2000, there were 454 people, 175 households, and 134 families living in the village. The population density was 1,346.8 inhabitants per square mile (520.0/km^{2}). There were 185 housing units at an average density of 548.8 per square mile (211.9/km^{2}). The racial makeup of the village was 97.14% White, 0.22% African American, 0.44% Native American, 0.22% Asian, 0.44% from other races, and 1.54% from two or more races. Hispanic or Latino of any race were 0.66% of the population.

There were 175 households, out of which 37.1% had children under the age of 18 living with them, 60.6% were married couples living together, 12.6% had a female householder with no husband present, and 22.9% were non-families. 17.7% of all households were made up of individuals, and 6.9% had someone living alone who was 65 years of age or older. The average household size was 2.59 and the average family size was 2.93.

In the village, the population was spread out, with 26.9% under the age of 18, 7.0% from 18 to 24, 32.6% from 25 to 44, 20.3% from 45 to 64, and 13.2% who were 65 years of age or older. The median age was 34 years. For every 100 females, there were 92.4 males. For every 100 females age 18 and over, there were 88.6 males.

The median income for a household in the village was $40,156, and the median income for a family was $44,306. Males had a median income of $33,333 versus $23,750 for females. The per capita income for the village was $15,928. About 3.6% of families and 8.4% of the population were below the poverty line, including 7.4% of those under age 18 and 14.6% of those age 65 or over.

== Government ==
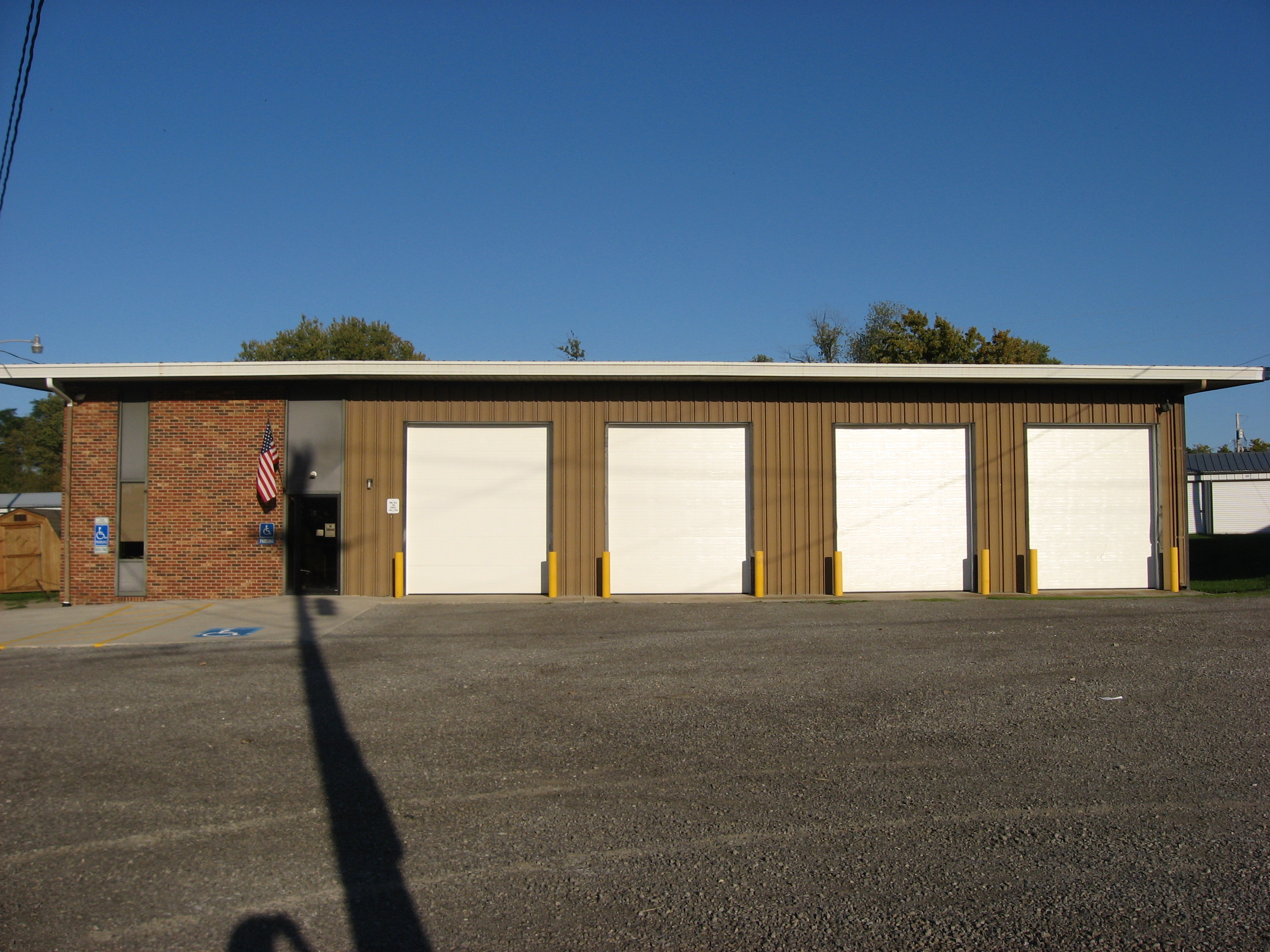
Huntsville Village Hall

Huntsville is governed by a mayor-council system. The Mayor is Joseph Hurley, and the council is composed of President Matt Groeschel and members Robin Jenkins, Mike Hyder, Margret Fraizer, Deb Anderson, Huntsville, 2021. In the November 2019 elections, Hurley was elected without opposition, Susan Yelton is hired as Fiscal officer.

== Transportation ==
Huntsville's beginnings include being that of a railroad town. The former Toledo and Ohio Central Railway ran through Huntsville and operated repair shops for its locomotive fleet. The railroad ran a branch line between Saint Marys, through Russells Point and towards East Liberty and Columbus. By the 1960s the section that ran between Bellefontaine and East Liberty was abandoned when it was part of the New York Central and then the remaining trackage between St. Marys and Bellefontaine abandoned in the 1970s when Penn Central fell into bankruptcy.

Despite its small size, Huntsville lies at the intersection of several highways. State Route 274 passes through the village, and State Route 117's southern end is at Huntsville. Moreover, U.S. Route 33 passes on the southwest edge of the village, and the eastern ends of State Routes 366 and 368 are located just north of the village.

== Notable people ==
- Lillian Brown, artist, radio and television producer, educator, and make-up artist
- George Russell Davis, jurist
