= Russells Point, Ohio =

- Village
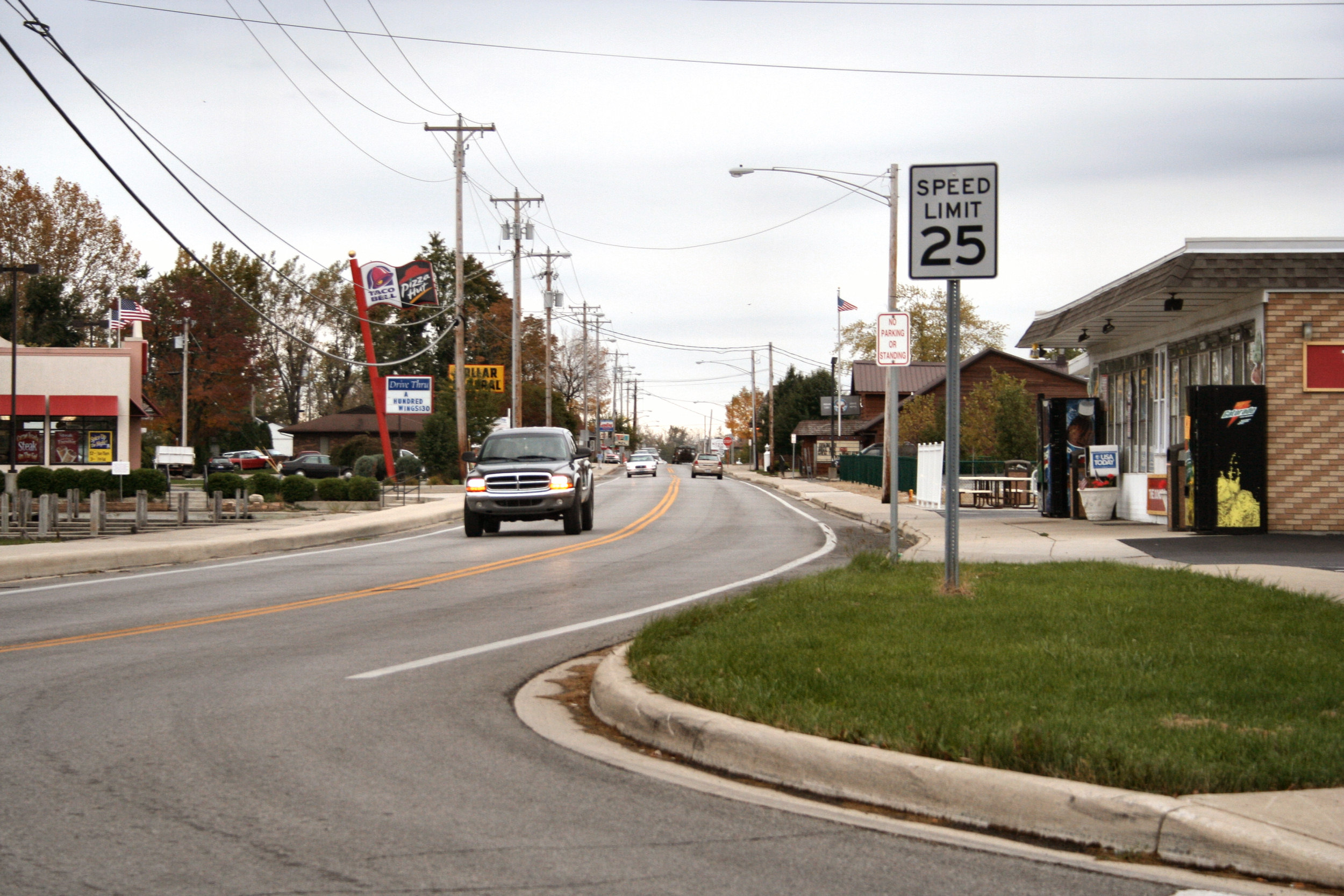
- Downtown Russells Point

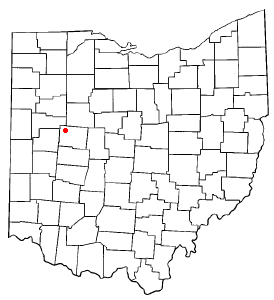
- Location of Russells Point, Ohio

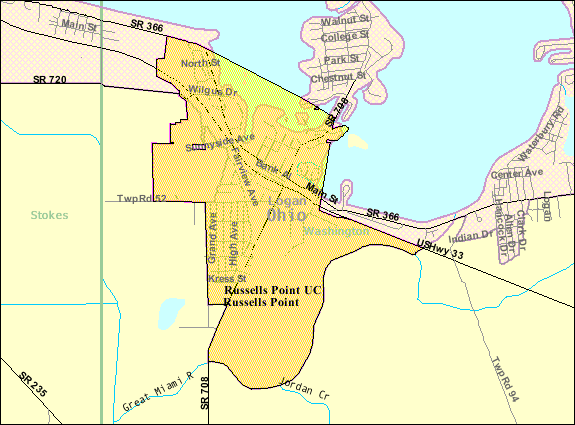
- Detailed map of Russells Point
- Coordinates: 40°28′06″N 83°53′38″W
- Country: United States
- State: Ohio
- County: Logan
- Townships: Washington, Stokes

Area
  - Total: 1.02 sq mi (2.63 km^{2})
  - Land: 0.93 sq mi (2.41 km^{2})
  - Water: 0.085 sq mi (0.22 km^{2})
- Elevation: 1,001 ft (305 m)

Population (2020)
  - Total: 1,320
  - Density: 1,420.0/sq mi (548.25/km^{2})
- Time zone: UTC-5 (Eastern (EST))
  - Summer (DST): UTC-4 (EDT)
- ZIP code: 43348
- Area codes: 937, 326
- FIPS code: 39-69302
- GNIS feature ID: 2399146
- Website: russellspoint-oh.gov

Russells Point is a village located in northwest Logan County, Ohio, United States. The population was 1,320 at the 2020 census. It is situated on Indian Lake, which has long been a popular summer resort destination.

== History ==
A post office called Russells Point has been in operation since 1913. The village was named after James Russell, owner of the town site.

On March 14, 2024, Russell's Point as well as several other communities nearby Indian Lake (Ohio) were struck by a large, considerable tornado at approximately 7:51 pm EST. At least three fatalities were reported as a result of the tornado along with many injuries and a great deal of damage, some catastrophic, to both homes and businesses. It has been reported that some structures were completely destroyed. The tornado was later identified as an EF-3 rated tornado by NWS survey teams.

== Geography ==
According to the United States Census Bureau, the village has a total area of 1.01 square miles (2.62 km^{2}), of which, 0.93 square miles (2.41 km^{2}) is land and 0.08 square miles (0.21 km^{2}) is water.

== Demographics ==
Historical population
Census	Pop.	Note	%±
1930	344		—
1940	554		61.0%
1950	909		64.1%
1960	1,111		22.2%
1970	1,104		−0.6%
1980	1,156		4.7%
1990	1,504		30.1%
2000	1,619		7.6%
2010	1,391		−14.1%
2020	1,320		−5.1%
U.S. Decennial Census

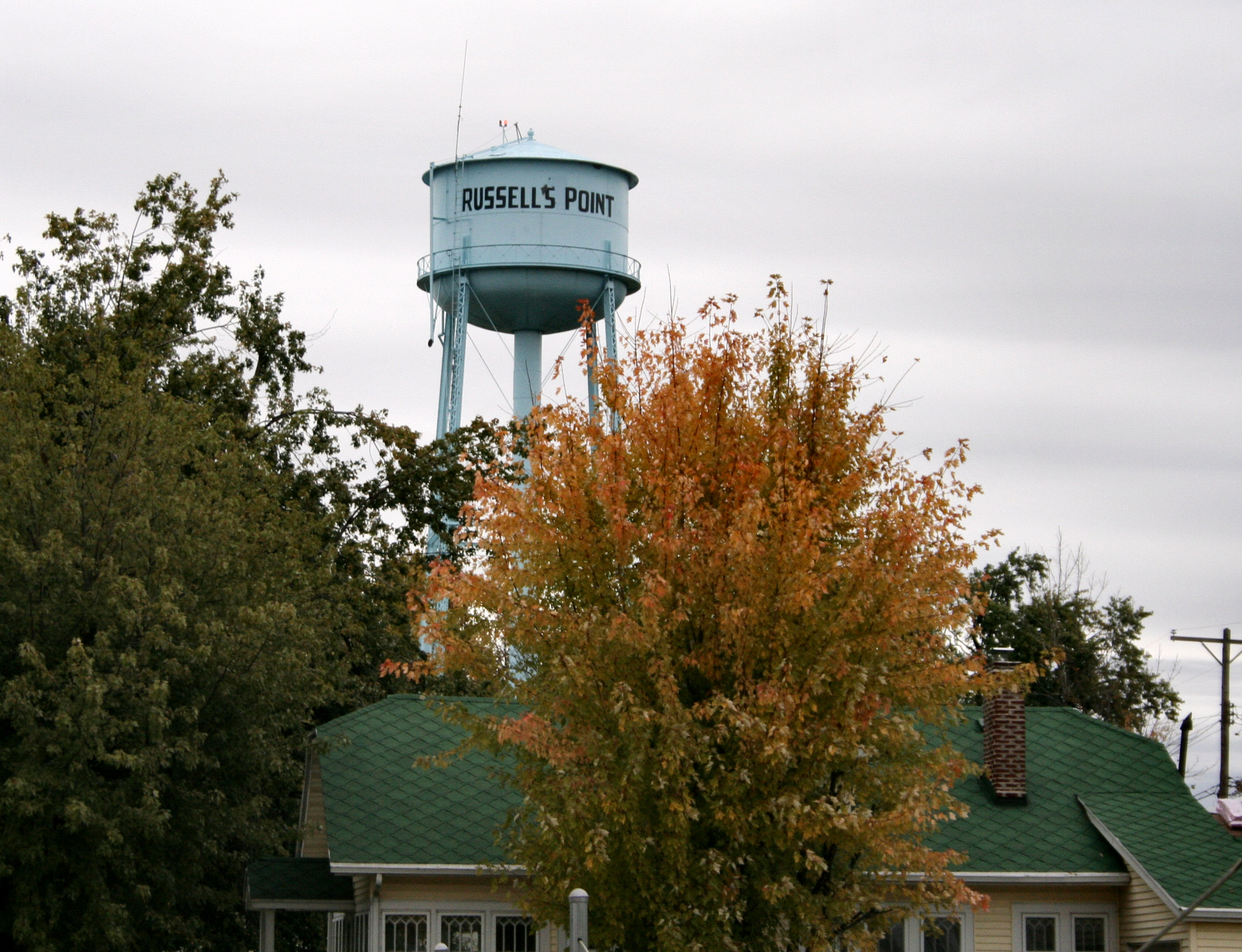
Water tower of Russells Point.

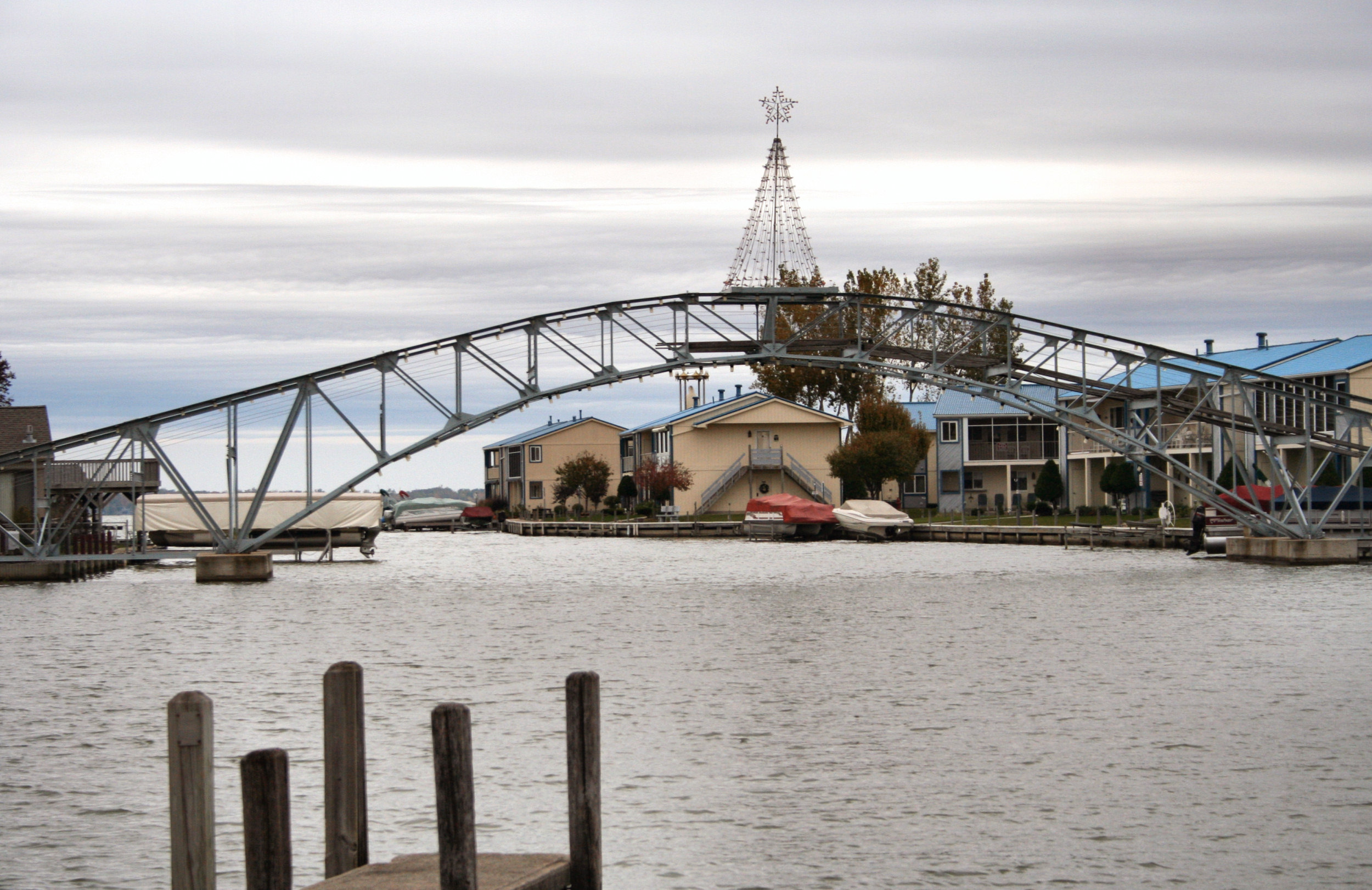
Sandy Beach Amusement Park Bridge.

=== 2010 census ===
As of the census of 2010, there were 1,391 people, 618 households, and 342 families living in the village. The population density was 1,495.7 inhabitants per square mile (577.5/km^{2}). There were 1,144 housing units at an average density of 1,230.1 per square mile (474.9/km^{2}). The racial makeup of the village was 97.3% White, 0.6% African American, 0.2% Native American, 0.1% Asian, 0.4% from other races, and 1.3% from two or more races. Hispanic or Latino of any race were 1.1% of the population.

There were 618 households, of which 31.9% had children under the age of 18 living with them, 35.1% were married couples living together, 15.7% had a female householder with no husband present, 4.5% had a male householder with no wife present, and 44.7% were non-families. 38.7% of all households were made up of individuals, and 17.3% had someone living alone who was 65 years of age or older. The average household size was 2.25 and the average family size was 2.97.

The median age in the village was 38 years. 25.7% of residents were under the age of 18; 9.1% were between the ages of 18 and 24; 25.2% were from 25 to 44; 23.3% were from 45 to 64; and 16.9% were 65 years of age or older. The gender makeup of the village was 48.6% male and 51.4% female.

=== 2000 census ===
As of the census of 2000, there were 1,619 people, 727 households, and 415 families living in the village. The population density was 1,733.1 inhabitants per square mile (669.2/km^{2}). There were 1,081 housing units at an average density of 1,157.2 per square mile (446.8/km^{2}). The racial makeup of the village was 98.15% White, 0.12% African American, 0.19% Native American, 0.43% Asian, 0.49% from other races, and 0.62% from two or more races. Hispanic or Latino of any race were 1.42% of the population.

There were 727 households, out of which 28.5% had children under the age of 18 living with them, 38.5% were married couples living together, 13.8% had a female householder with no husband present, and 42.8% were non-families. 37.7% of all households were made up of individuals, and 17.3% had someone living alone who was 65 years of age or older. The average household size was 2.23 and the average family size was 2.91.

In the village, the population was spread out, with 26.7% under the age of 18, 8.2% from 18 to 24, 24.5% from 25 to 44, 24.3% from 45 to 64, and 16.4% who were 65 years of age or older. The median age was 36 years. For every 100 females, there were 87.0 males. For every 100 females age 18 and over, there were 82.6 males.

The median income for a household in the village was $27,589, and the median income for a family was $37,434. Males had a median income of $35,326 versus $21,667 for females. The per capita income for the village was $15,835. About 17.7% of families and 20.2% of the population were below the poverty line, including 26.3% of those under age 18 and 13.3% of those age 65 or over.

== Government ==
The village of Russells Point also owns local low power WRPO (93.5 FM), operated by Gray Fox Broadcasting as its locally originating community radio station.

== Transportation ==
Due to its location on the south shore of Indian Lake, Russells Point includes several highways. U.S. Route 33 is the main street in Russells Point, and State Routes 366 and 708 are also important. State Route 720 begins on the northwestern side of the village.

=== Commercial ports ===
Maritime access is available at several commercial establishments, including restaurants, which have docks for boats.
