= Lakeview, Ohio =

- Village
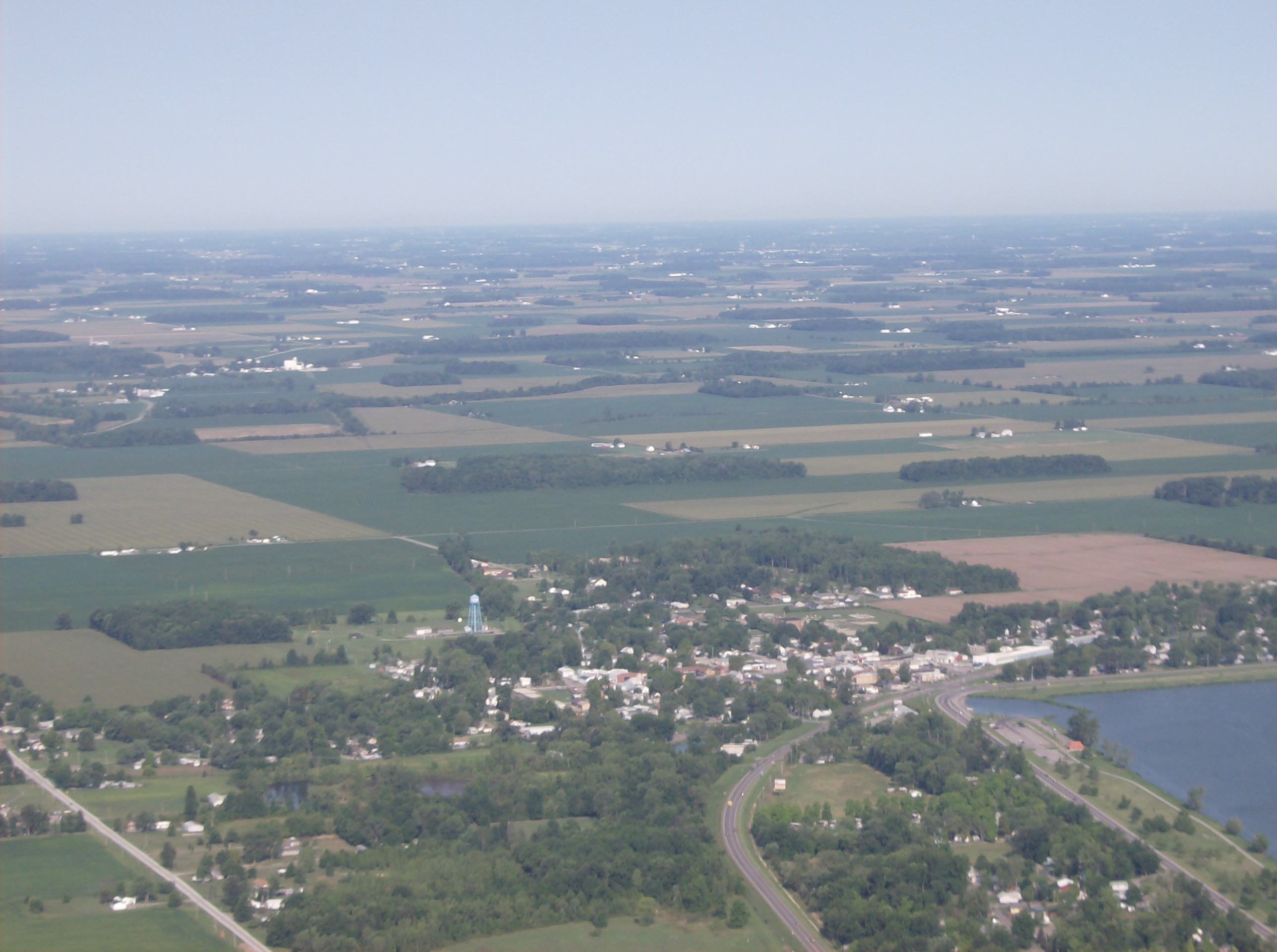
- Lakeview from the east

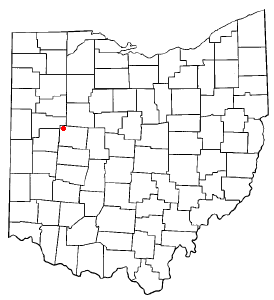
- Location of Lakeview, Ohio

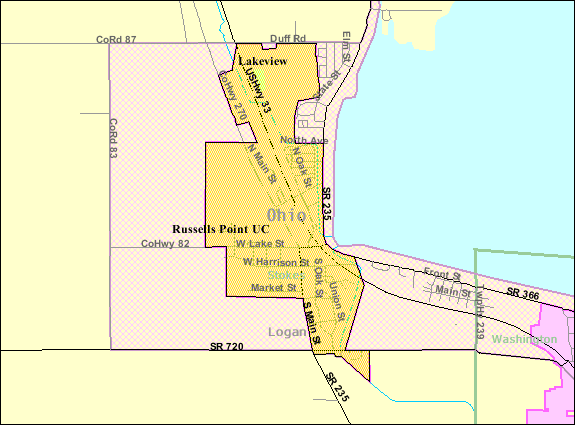
- Detailed map of Lakeview
- Coordinates: 40°29′15″N 83°55′36″W
- Country: United States
- State: Ohio
- County: Logan
- Township: Stokes

Area
  - Total: 0.71 sq mi (1.85 km^{2})
  - Land: 0.71 sq mi (1.83 km^{2})
  - Water: 0.0039 sq mi (0.01 km^{2})
- Elevation: 994 ft (303 m)

Population (2020)
  - Total: 1,184
  - Density: 1,671.6/sq mi (645.41/km^{2})
- Time zone: UTC-5 (Eastern (EST))
  - Summer (DST): UTC-4 (EDT)
- ZIP code: 43331
- Area codes: 937, 326
- FIPS code: 39-41608
- GNIS feature ID: 2398388
- Website: lakeviewohio.com

Lakeview is a village in Logan County, Ohio, United States. The population was 1,184 at the 2020 census.

A branch of the Logan County District Library serves the Lakeview community.

The town was heavily damaged by an EF3 tornado on March 14, 2024. The tornado killed three people and injured 27 others along its track.

== Geography ==
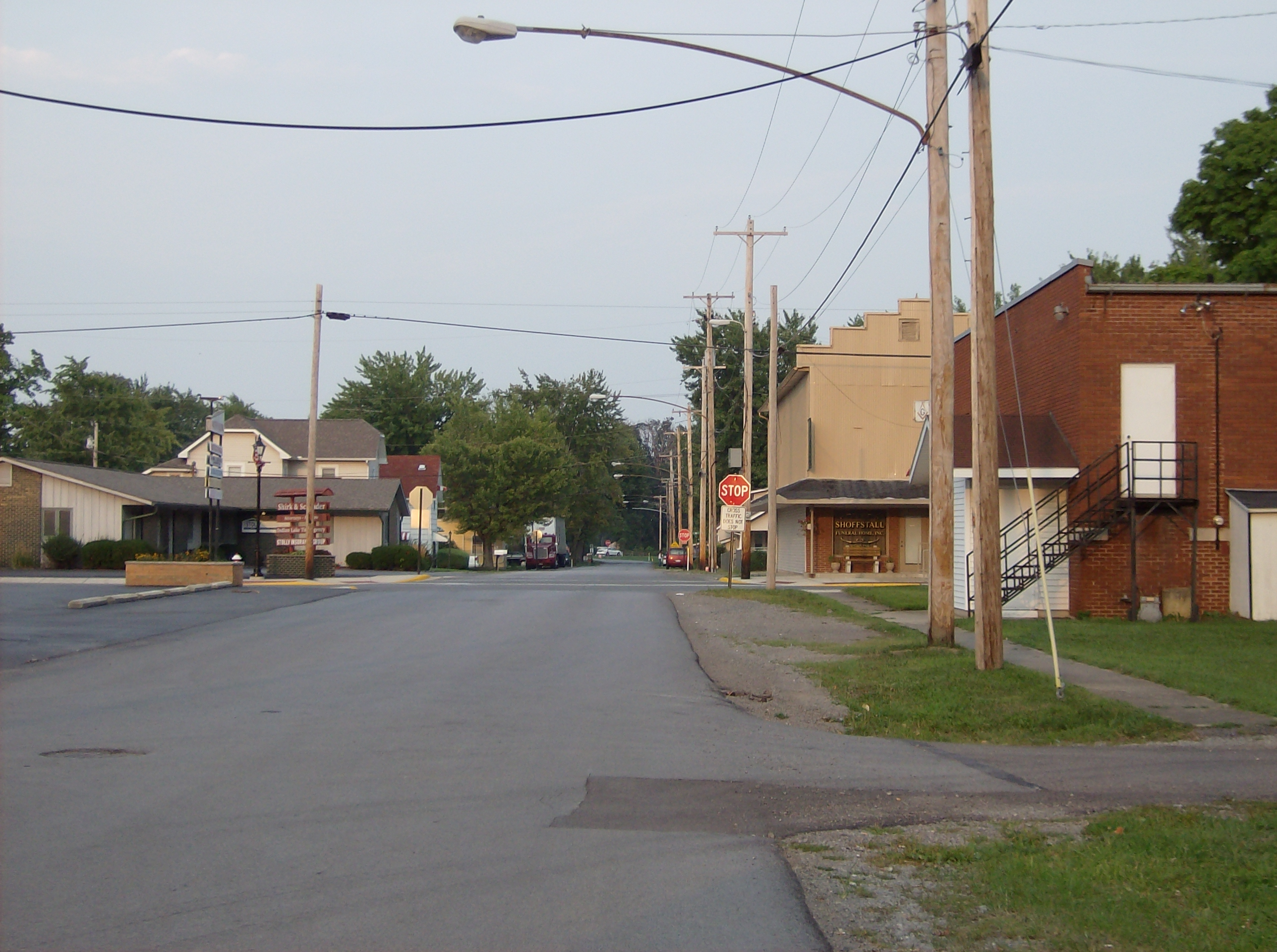
Along a street in central Lakeview

According to the United States Census Bureau, the village has a total area of 0.72 square miles (1.86 km^{2}), of which, 0.71 square miles (1.84 km^{2}) is land and 0.01 square miles (0.03 km^{2}) is water.

Lakeview takes its name from Indian Lake, a mostly artificial lake nearby. Part of the village's perimeter is bounded by the lakeshore.

== Demographics ==
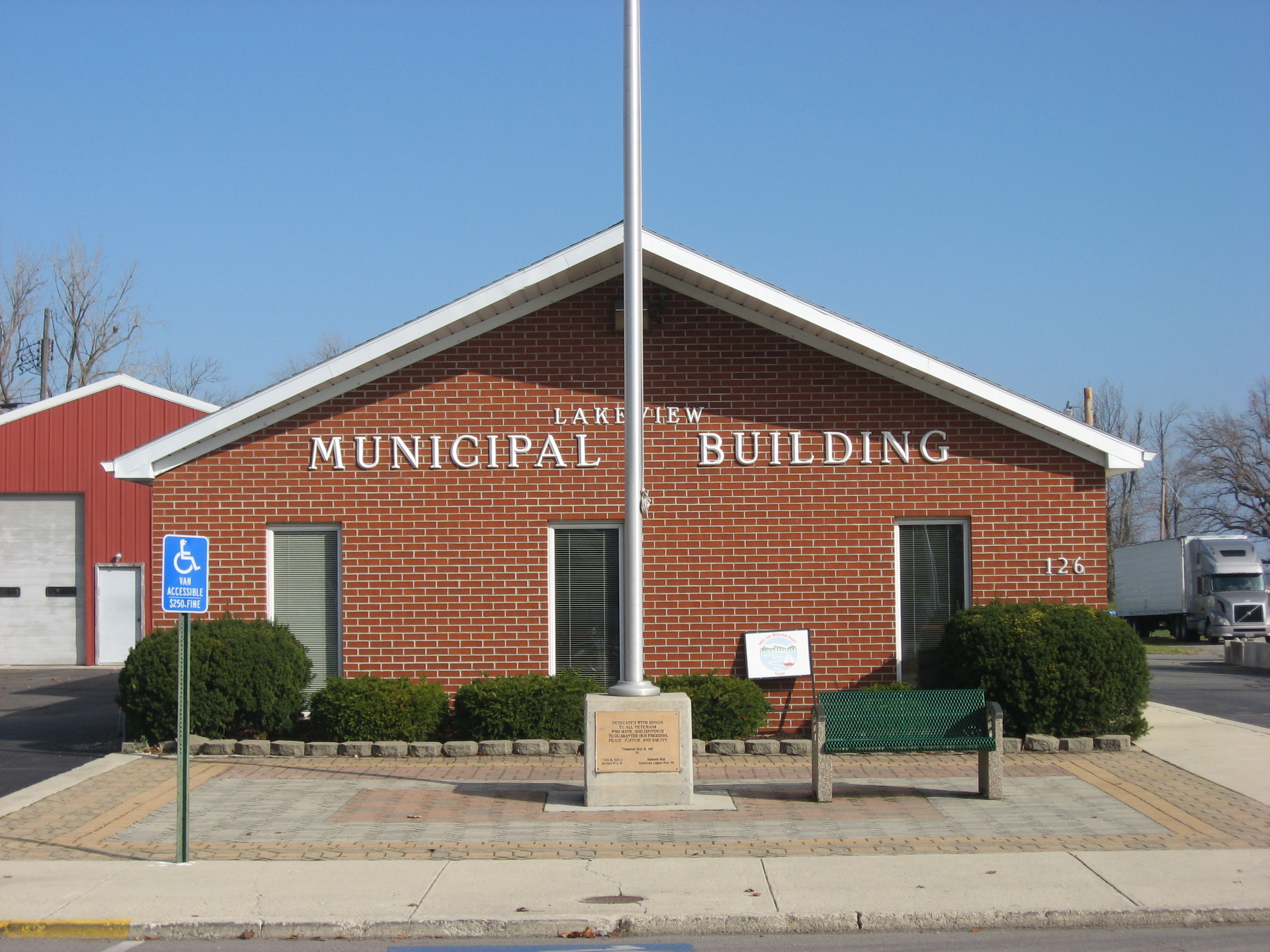
Lakeview Village Hall

Historical population
Census	Pop.	Note	%±
1900	553		—
1910	528		−4.5%
1920	549		4.0%
1930	586		6.7%
1940	726		23.9%
1950	966		33.1%
1960	1,008		4.3%
1970	1,026		1.8%
1980	1,089		6.1%
1990	1,056		−3.0%
2000	1,074		1.7%
2010	1,072		−0.2%
2020	1,184		10.4%
U.S. Decennial Census

=== 2010 census ===
As of the census of 2010, there were 1,072 people, 446 households, and 272 families living in the village. The population density was 1,509.9 inhabitants per square mile (583.0/km^{2}). There were 576 housing units at an average density of 811.3 per square mile (313.2/km^{2}). The racial makeup of the village was 97.2% White, 0.7% African American, 0.3% Native American, 0.1% Asian, 0.1% Pacific Islander, 0.4% from other races, and 1.2% from two or more races. Hispanic or Latino of any race were 1.0% of the population.

There were 446 households, of which 29.1% had children under the age of 18 living with them, 43.0% were married couples living together, 9.6% had a female householder with no husband present, 8.3% had a male householder with no wife present, and 39.0% were non-families. 31.2% of all households were made up of individuals, and 12.5% had someone living alone who was 65 years of age or older. The average household size was 2.39 and the average family size was 2.98.

The median age in the village was 39.8 years. 23.2% of residents were under the age of 18; 9.6% were between the ages of 18 and 24; 25.5% were from 25 to 44; 26.9% were from 45 to 64; and 14.7% were 65 years of age or older. The gender makeup of the village was 48.0% male and 52.0% female.

=== 2000 census ===
As of the census of 2000, there were 1,074 people, 437 households, and 295 families living in the village. The population density was 1,570.2 inhabitants per square mile (606.3/km^{2}). There were 524 housing units at an average density of 766.1 per square mile (295.8/km^{2}). The racial makeup of the village was 97.30% White, 0.09% African American, 0.56% Native American, 0.28% Asian, 0.47% from other races, and 1.30% from two or more races. Hispanic or Latino of any race were 0.47% of the population.

There were 437 households, out of which 32.5% had children under the age of 18 living with them, 51.7% were married couples living together, 11.2% had a female householder with no husband present, and 32.3% were non-families. 27.9% of all households were made up of individuals, and 12.1% had someone living alone who was 65 years of age or older. The average household size was 2.46 and the average family size was 2.97.

In the village, the population was spread out, with 27.5% under the age of 18, 7.4% from 18 to 24, 28.5% from 25 to 44, 20.6% from 45 to 64, and 16.1% who were 65 years of age or older. The median age was 36 years. For every 100 females, there were 94.9 males. For every 100 females age 18 and over, there were 91.9 males.

The median income for a household in the village was $34,297, and the median income for a family was $40,714. Males had a median income of $35,000 versus $20,625 for females. The per capita income for the village was $16,148. About 6.8% of families and 10.9% of the population were below the poverty line, including 12.4% of those under age 18 and 12.7% of those age 65 or over.

== Education ==
Lakeview has a public library, a branch of Logan County Libraries.

== Transportation ==
Lakeview's location at the southwest corner of Indian Lake causes several highways to pass through the village. U.S. Route 33 goes through Lakeview's downtown, while State Routes 235 and 366 pass along the lakeshore. State Route 720 passes through the extreme south of the village.
