= Indian Lake (Ohio) =

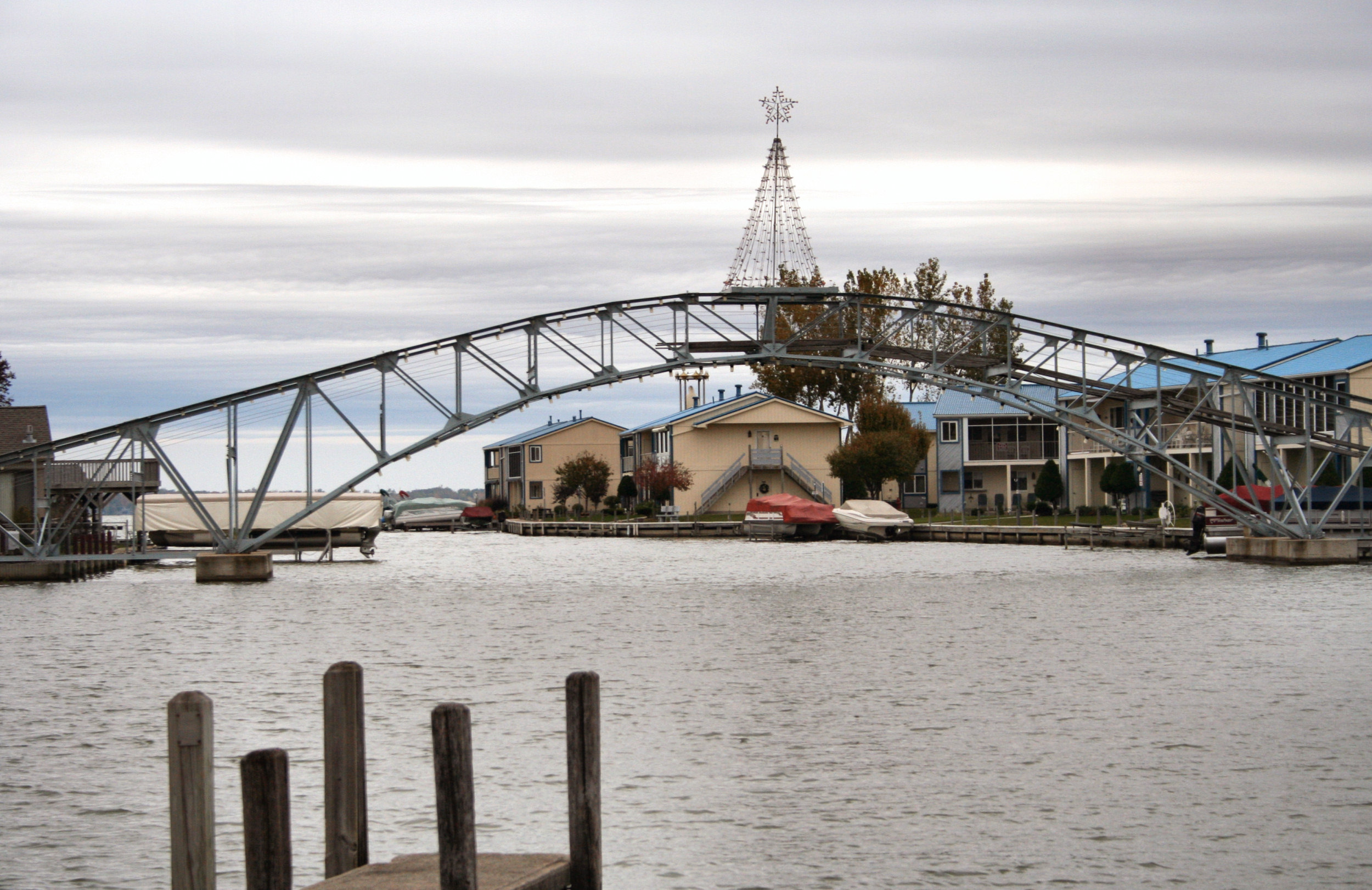
- Bridge at Russells Point, last remaining part of the Sandy Beach Amusement Park

- Location within Ohio Location within the United States
- Location: Logan County, Ohio, United States
- Coordinates: 40°28′03″N 83°52′31″W
- Lake type: Reservoir
- Primary inflows: North and south forks of the Upper Great Miami River, Cherokee Mans Run, Blackhawk Creek, Van Horn Creek
- Primary outflows: Great Miami River
- Basin countries: United States
- Surface area: 5,104 acres (2,066 ha)
- Average depth: 10 feet (3.0 m)
- Max. depth: 24.8 feet (7.6 m)
- Surface elevation: 995.8 feet (303.5 m)
- Settlements: Russells Point, Lakeview
- Area: Land: 800 acres (320 ha); Water: 5,100 acres (2,100 ha)
- Established: 1898
- Administrator: Ohio Department of Natural Resources
- Designation: Ohio state park
- Website: Official website

Indian Lake (formerly Lewistown Reservoir) is a reservoir in Logan County, western Ohio, in the United States. It is approximately 20 miles (32 km) southeast of Lima. It is fed by the north and south forks of the Upper Great Miami River, Cherokee Mans Run, Blackhawk Creek, and Van Horn Creek. The outlet of the lake, at the bulkhead or "spillway" (located at what is now State Route 366) built in the 1850s by Irish laborers, is the beginning of the Great Miami River. At 5,104 acres (2,066 ha), Indian Lake is the second largest inland lake in Ohio.

Indian Lake has numerous islands, including the "Indian Isles" chain that arcs through the center of the Lake, expansive wildlife areas accessible by a network of channels, numerous inlets and bays, and approximately 30 miles (48 km) of shoreline. The lake, and adjoining Oldfield Beach (the end point of a several mile, lake-front biking/walking trail), Moundwood and Lakeview Harbor boat ramps, marinas at Moundwood and at Cherokee Campgrounds, and other greenspaces including Pew Island, are managed by the Ohio Department of Natural Resources as part of the Ohio state park system. Popular state walking trails are located, in addition to the one ending at Oldfield Beach, at Pew Island and at the Cherokee Campgrounds.

In its early days extending into the middle of the 20th century, the lake was primarily a destination resort, with many waterfront cottages being lightly built primarily for summer use. Many knew of it as the location of the amusement park with its roller-coaster and other rides and a dancehall, discussed below. While still busiest in the summer, since the late 20th century the lakefront has become developed as an area of second or retirement homes, with many new permanent houses, and remodeling of numerous older cottages.

== History ==
Early settlers found a group of small lakes and wetlands, occupying about 640 acres (2.6 km^{2}), and named them for the Indian tribes living in the region. The area was ideal for fishing and hunting, but in the 1850s it was converted into the 6,334-acre (25.63 km^{2}) "Lewistown Reservoir," in order to collect water for the Sidney Feeder to the Miami and Erie Canal, which extended from Toledo to Cincinnati. Within a few years after its construction, the canal system became an obsolete form of transportation compared to the new and growing railways.

However, Indian Lake remained. It was well served by the railways, and has become a destination for leisure activities and recreation such as fishing and boating. In its early years, the lake had bass as a prize catch for fishermen, with bluegill and crappies being caught in great numbers. Since the mid-20th century, the lake has been stocked with fish including saugeye, for which it has been nationally recognized. Several major fishing tournaments are held each year, with local bass clubs holding weekly contests. Generally these follow "catch and return" rules.

On March 14, 2024, many communities around Indian Lake, such as Russells Point, Ohio and Orchard Island, Ohio, were struck by a large, considerable tornado. Some fatalities were reported, many injuries occurred and a large amount of damage to homes and businesses has been reported. A mobile home park located between Lakeview and Russell's Point suffered a direct hit from the tornado. Schools in Indian Lake were closed as a result of the tornado and resultant power outages, but the facilities were opened as shelters for those with damaged homes. The tornado was later classified after a NWS damage survey as an EF-3 tornado.

== Sandy Beach Park ==
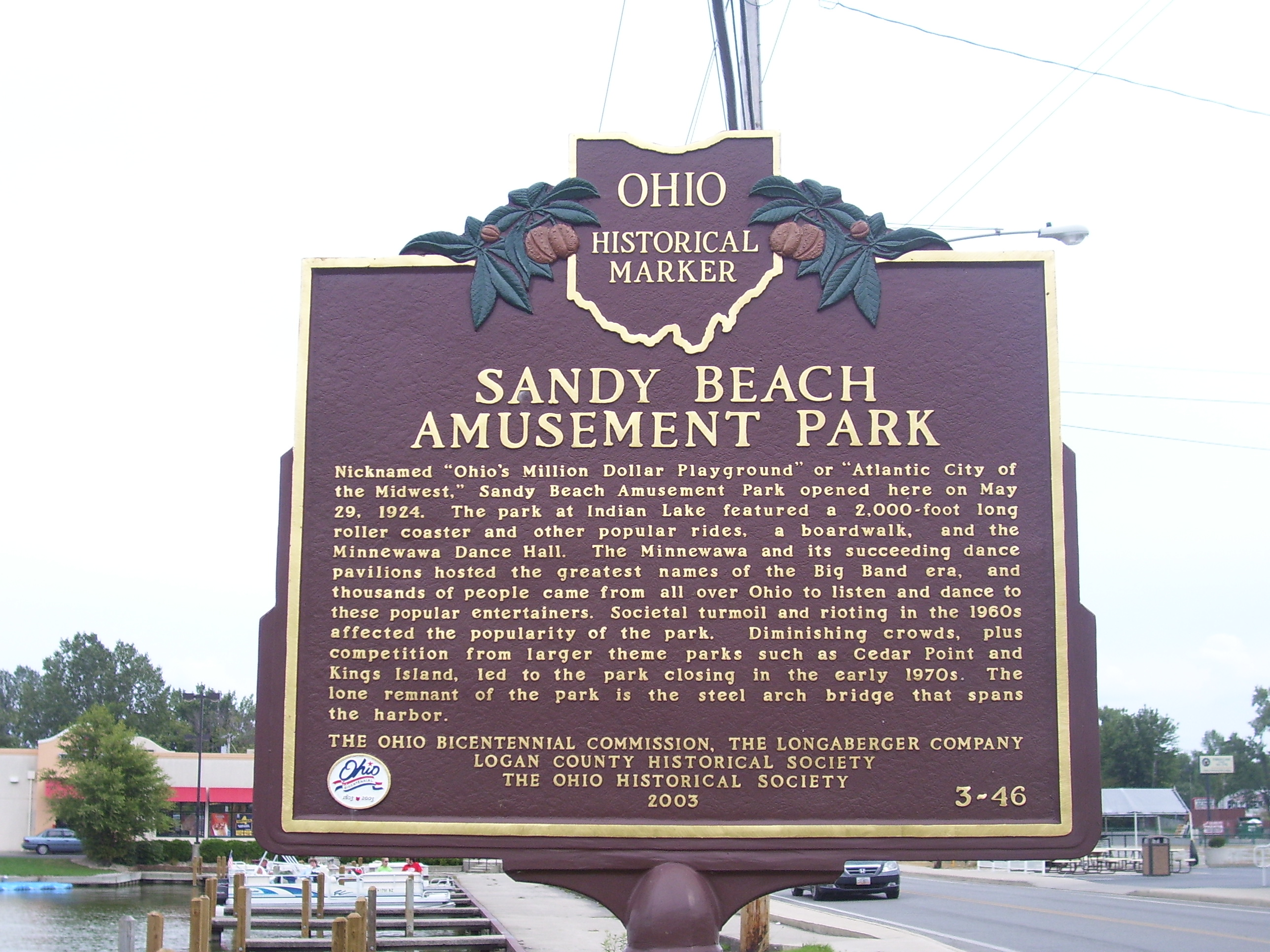
Ohio historical marker outlining the history of the amusement park

A major part of the lake's history is the amusement park and dancehall once in Russells Point, advertised as the "Midwest's Million Dollar Playground". Pappy Wilgus, a Russells Point resident, built Sandy Beach Amusement Park, which opened to the public on May 29, 1924. It was promoted as the "Atlantic City of the West". They erected a 2,000-foot (610 m) "out and back" wooden roller coaster, built by the National Amusement Device Company, known variously as "Coaster", "Thriller", "Big Dipper" and "Silver Streak" through the years. The park offered a penny arcade, a carousel, a millrace ride, a Ferris wheel, a funhouse, boat excursions, and a boardwalk to Sandy Beach Island for swimming.

A major attraction was the Minnewawa Dance Hall. With two bandstands and room for hundreds of couples, the park claimed it was the largest and best dance hall in Ohio. Famous orchestras such as those led by Paul Whiteman and Rudy Vallée packed in the crowds. Sandy Beach was a great success even during the Great Depression, and hosted many dance marathons in the 1920s and early 1930s. The 1931 National Endurance Dance Marathon, held in Minnewawa, lasted an incredible 80 days, 2 hours. When a fire destroyed much of the wooden structures of the park in 1935, the park was sold to new owners. They invested $100,000 in rebuilding, including replacing Minnewawa Dance Hall with the Moonlight Terrace Gardens. Crowds continued to come through the 1950s. Over 100,000 attended the 1953 Ohio Sesquicentennial celebration at Indian Lake.

The park and dancehall began to deteriorate and decline in the 1950s, as attendance fell due to people having more choices and access by personal cars. The park was renamed "San Juan Amusement Park", inspired by a vintage neon sign "San Juan Hotel" located near the park's entrance. On the evening of July 4, 1961, rowdies at Russells Point bars across the street started fighting - and before the evening was over, there was a riot involving nearly 500 youths. For nearly a decade, there were repeats of the Independence Day weekend riots. Families chose to go to safer destinations, and motorcycle gangs were attracted to the disruption and came to be part of it. The park management fought back, increasing their security budget, and when it appeared that they had turned the corner on the violence, they renamed the park "Indian Lake Playland" in 1967. An illuminated slowly revolving statue of the Virgin Mary was erected at the park in 1964 adjacent to the lake in an effort to bring families back. The statue, still locally maintained, remains there to this day.

But large, modern new parks at Cedar Point and Kings Island, each within about a two-hour drive, drew away customers. Seeing the success of Disneyland in Anaheim, California, investors in Sandusky, Ohio, made massive investments in Cedar Point in the 1960s. In 1972, the Taft family (Taft Broadcasting) relocated some rides from Coney Island Amusement Park on the banks of the Ohio River 10 miles east of downtown Cincinnati to Kings Mills, Ohio, where they provided the start for a major new theme park known as Kings Island. The Indian Lake park bought a second roller coaster, one of the popular Ben Schiff "Wild Mouse" coasters, but it was to no avail. The park sold the steel coaster, replacing it with a giant multicolored steel slide, before closing down in 1975. The wooden coaster and other rides continued to deteriorate and sit idle until the park was razed in 1982 after the property was purchased in 1981. Many of the dismantled kiddie rides and other park memorabilia were auctioned off prior to the park's demolition. Much of the property has been privately developed.

The park was divided by a channel, the entrance to the Russells Point harbor, with a 1920s footbridge connecting the two sides. A lack of maintenance led to the bridge's closing decades later, though it remained standing. Private residential development has taken place on former parkland, and condos and apartments line the water. Local fundraising and grants allowed the bridge to be re-lighted in 2010, and in 2014 the bridge was renovated with brick walkways and reopened to the public in a ceremony on August 23, 2014.

== The Area ==
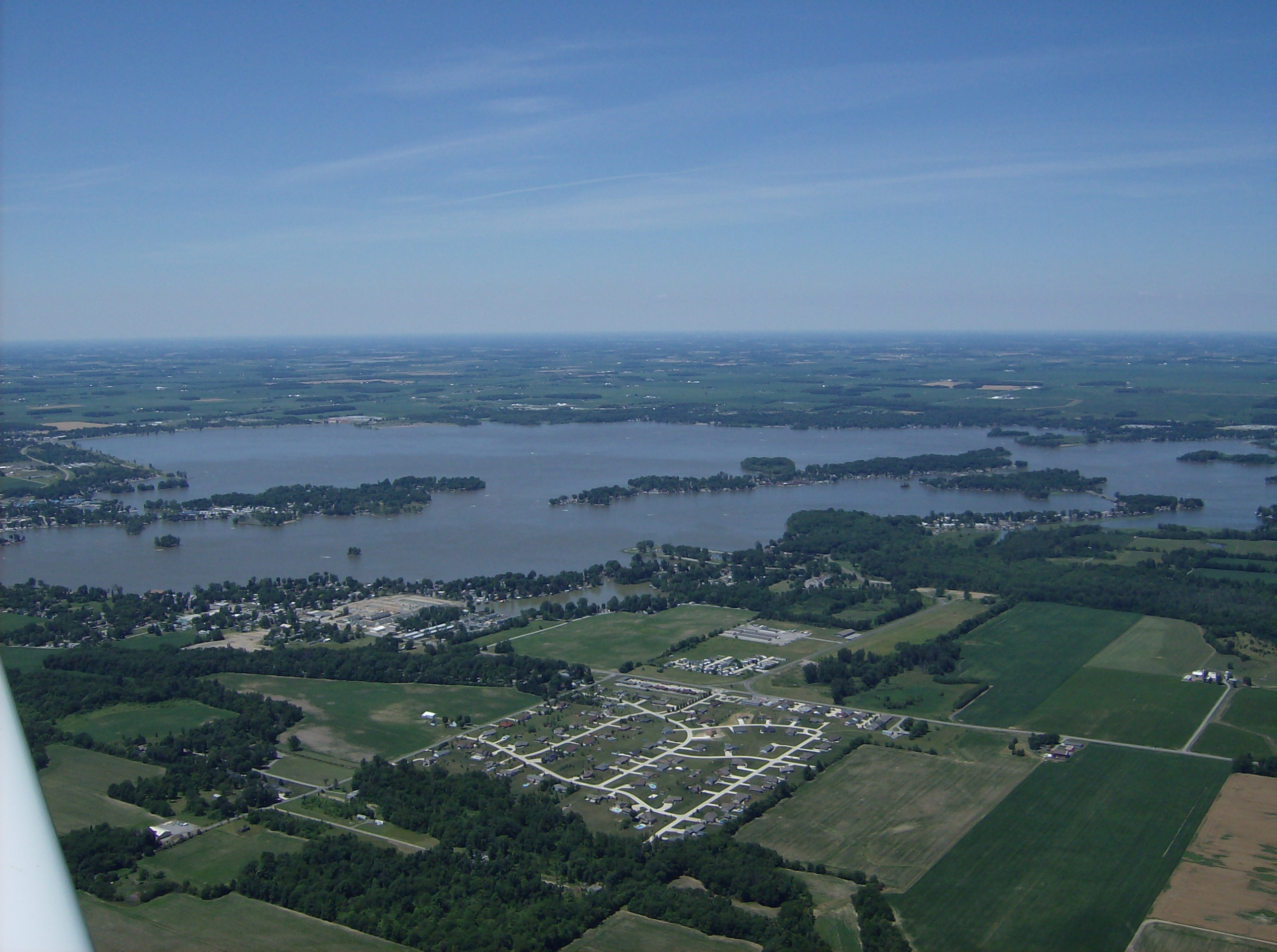
Aerial view of the lake in summer

Two villages are located on the lake: Russells Point on the south end, and Lakeview about 2 miles (3 km) to the northwest along U.S. 33. Other parts of the lake area are within various other government areas: a large part of the lake area is within Stokes Township, while some of the south side is part of Washington Township and some of the east side is part of Richland Township. Its location in the northwestern corner of Logan County places it near Roundhead Township in Hardin County, Goshen Township and Clay Township in Auglaize County, and Jackson Township in Shelby County. Not surprisingly, mail directed to the lake area contains various zip codes.

Many unincorporated but well-known areas are part of the lake community: Crystal Beach Island, Wolf and Orchard Islands, Artists' Isle, Waterbury, Dunn's Pond, O'Connor's Point, Lake Breeze, Long Island, Avondale, King's Landing, Turkeyfoot and Sassafras Points, Chippewa and Blackhawk, and the many islands and areas comprising the Indian Isles: Lake Ridge, Shawnee, Seminole, Cranberry Bay, Miami, Tecumseh, and Minnewauken.

Local low-power FM station WRPO in Russells Point serves the lake area; it is operated by a community-minded citizen.

== Traditions ==
The lake calendar begins with Jimmy Buffett weekend in the first week of February, followed by the annual Boat Show the first weekend in March. An ever-growing fireworks display, part of July 4 observances, is witnessed by people on hundreds of boats as well as crowds along the shores. The "Ring of Fire", on the Sunday evening of Labor Day weekend, by lore extends an Indian tradition in celebration of the harvest. Some event, whether a restored Chris-Craft boat show, a fishing tournament, or charity "poker runs" around the lake, is scheduled on almost every summer weekend. Local folklore refers to an abandoned lead mine under the lake, and use of the north side of the lake and the dancehall by Chicago mobsters in days gone by.

== Islands ==
- Artist Island
- Bank Island
- Bellefontaine Island
- Big Walnut Island
- Blackhawk Island
- Chippewa Island
- Crystal Beach Island
- Crane Town Island
- Dredge Island
- Duck Island
- Ewing Island—formerly known as Hermit Island
- Fantasy Island
- Fawn Island
- Fox Island
- Governor's Island
- Hermit Island—currently known as Ewing Island
- Lake Ridge Island
- Little Walnut Island
- Long Island
- Miami Island
- Minnewauken Island
- Neely Island
- No Name Island
- Oak Island
- Old Field Island
- Orchard Island
- Paradise Island
- Pew Island
- Pony Island
- Rat Island
- Red Oak Island
- Richard Island
- Shawnee Island
- Seminole Island
- Silver Island
- Sisson Island
- Snow Island
- South Walnut Island
- Sunset Island
- Tecumseh Island
- Treasure Island
- Turkey Foot Island
- Turtle Shell Island
- Wedge Island
- Willow Island
- Wolf Island

== See also ==
- O'Connor's Landing
- List of lakes of Ohio
