= National Register of Historic Places listings in Trimble County, Kentucky =

Location of Trimble County in Kentucky

Trimble County, Kentucky, United States, has 29 properties and districts listed on the National Register of Historic Places.

The locations of National Register properties and districts for which the latitude and longitude coordinates are included below may be seen in a Google map.

This National Park Service list is complete through NPS recent listings posted June 19, 2026.

== Current listings ==
	Name on the Register	Image	Date listed	Location	City or town	Description
1	Bates House	Bates House	April 9, 1984 (#84002026)	New Hope Rd. 38°38′41″N 85°20′57″W	Bedford	
2	Callis General Store and Post Office	Callis General Store and Post Office	July 21, 1983 (#83002878)	New Hope Rd. 38°38′41″N 85°19′42″W	Bedford	No longer extant.
3	Coleman House	Coleman House	July 21, 1983 (#83002880)	Main St. 38°35′27″N 85°19′08″W	Bedford	
4	William L. Coleman House	William L. Coleman House	July 21, 1983 (#83002879)	Sulphur-Bedford Rd. 38°32′42″N 85°17′56″W	Bedford	
5	Ginn's Furniture Store	Ginn's Furniture Store	July 21, 1983 (#83002881)	Main St. 38°43′29″N 85°22′10″W	Milton	
6	Hancock House	Hancock House	April 9, 1984 (#84002029)	Main St. 38°35′39″N 85°19′01″W	Bedford	
7	House at Moffett Cemetery Road	House at Moffett Cemetery Road	July 21, 1983 (#83002882)	Moffett Cemetery Rd. 38°43′05″N 85°22′35″W	Milton	
8	House on KY 1492		April 9, 1984 (#84002031)	Kentucky Route 1492; 38°41′18″N 85°19′40″W	Milton	Federal-style house built in early 1800s.
9	House Tm-B-7	House Tm-B-7	April 9, 1984 (#84002033)	Main St. 38°35′41″N 85°19′01″W	Bedford	
10	House Tm-M-27	House Tm-M-27	April 9, 1984 (#84002035)	Kentucky Route 36; 38°43′28″N 85°21′57″W	Milton	
11	House Tm-M-28	House Tm-M-28	April 9, 1984 (#84002036)	Kentucky Route 36; 38°43′28″N 85°21′56″W	Milton	
12	Humphrey Place	Humphrey Place	July 21, 1983 (#83002883)	North of Bedford on U.S. Route 421; 38°38′27″N 85°19′37″W	Bedford	
13	Hunter's Bottom Historic District	Hunter's Bottom Historic District	August 11, 1976 (#76000862)	West of Carrollton; 38°43′29″N 85°20′57″W	Carrollton	Extends into Carroll County
14	W.W. Logan House	W.W. Logan House	April 9, 1984 (#84002052)	Sulpher-Bedford Pike; 38°32′22″N 85°18′00″W	Bedford	
15	Milton Masonic Lodge and County General Store	Milton Masonic Lodge and County General Store	July 21, 1983 (#83002884)	Main St. 38°43′29″N 85°22′08″W	Milton	
16	Moreland School		April 9, 1984 (#84002053)	Cooper's Bottom Rd. 38°40′19″N 85°25′59″W	Milton	
17	Neal House	Neal House	April 9, 1984 (#84002054)	U.S. Route 421; 38°41′41″N 85°21′55″W	Milton	
18	Norfolk Farm Tenant Log House		January 8, 2014 (#13001055)	600 Log House Ln. 38°37′17″N 85°23′59″W	Bedford	
19	Old Kentucky Tavern		July 21, 1983 (#83002885)	U.S. Route 42; 38°31′46″N 85°20′11″W	Bedford	Five miles south of Bedford; a significant landmark since the days of the stagecoach
20	Page House	Page House	April 10, 1984 (#84002056)	Cooper's Bottom Rd. 38°43′45″N 85°24′58″W	Milton	No longer extant.
21	Page-Bell House		July 21, 1983 (#83002886)	Cooper's Bottom Rd. 38°43′03″N 85°25′57″W	Milton	
22	Peak House	Peak House	April 9, 1984 (#84002057)	Spring and West Sts. 38°35′35″N 85°19′07″W	Bedford	
23	Preston House		July 21, 1983 (#83002887)	Rodgers Rd. 38°37′58″N 85°25′31″W	Milton	
24	Rowlett House		April 9, 1984 (#84002058)	Kentucky Route 625; 38°37′52″N 85°23′53″W	Milton	No longer extant.
25	Rowlett's Grocery	Rowlett's Grocery	July 21, 1983 (#83002888)	Main St. 38°43′26″N 85°22′09″W	Milton	
26	Third Street Historic District	Third Street Historic District	April 10, 1984 (#84002059)	3rd St. at U.S. Route 421; 38°43′28″N 85°22′12″W	Milton	
27	Trimble County Jail	Trimble County Jail	April 9, 1984 (#84002061)	Main St. 38°35′37″N 85°19′04″W	Bedford	
28	Trout House		July 21, 1983 (#83002889)	Kentucky Route 625; 38°40′15″N 85°24′55″W	Milton	
29	Yeager General Store	Yeager General Store	July 21, 1983 (#83004528)	Barebone Rd. 38°34′14″N 85°24′25″W	Wises Landing	

== See also ==
- List of National Historic Landmarks in Kentucky
- National Register of Historic Places listings in Kentucky
- List of attractions and events in the Louisville metropolitan area
