= Tornado outbreak of March 13–15, 2024 =

Early-season tornado outbreak in Southern United States

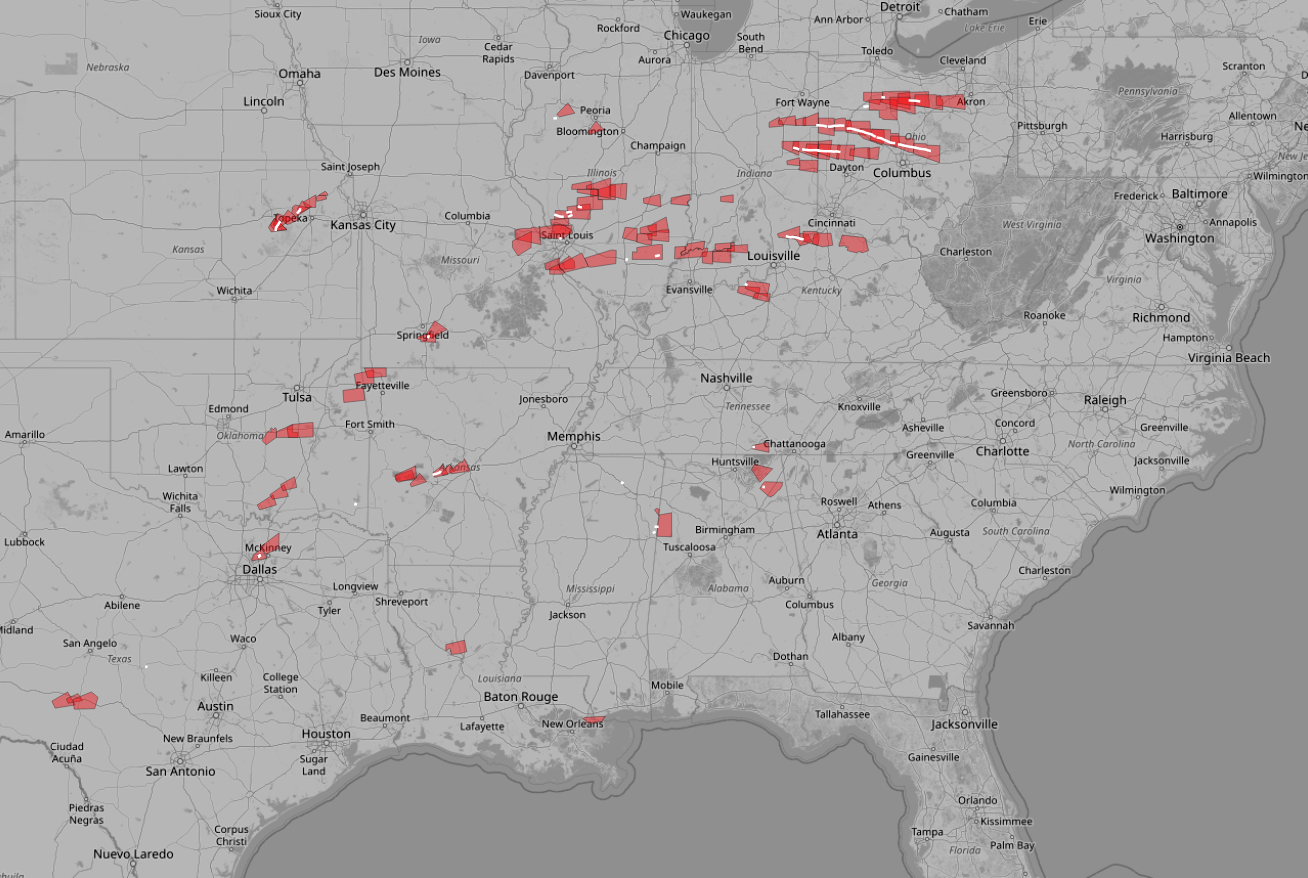
- Map of confirmed tornadoes during the outbreak (indicated in white) and tornado warnings issued during the outbreak (indicated in red).

Tornado outbreak
- Tornadoes: 34
- Max. rating: EF3 tornado
- Duration: March 13–15, 2024
- Highest winds: 165 mph (Winchester, Indiana on March 14)

Overall effects
- Fatalities: 4
- Injuries: 69
- Damage: $5.9 billion (2024 USD)
- Areas affected: Midwestern, Southern, Northeastern United States
- Part of the Tornadoes of 2024

A significant early spring tornado outbreak occurred throughout the Midwestern and Northeastern United States, with the most significant impacts occurring in Indiana and Ohio. More than two dozen tornadoes occurred, eight of them strong to intense. National Weather Service offices issued multiple 'Particularly Dangerous Situation' tornado warnings. Strong tornadoes produced major damage in the communities of Selma and Winchester in Indiana, and Fryburg and Lakeview in Ohio. One person died in Winchester, and three people were killed in Lakeview. Other significant tornadoes caused damage in Kansas, Arkansas, and Kentucky, with scattered weak tornadoes confirmed in several other states.

In addition to tornadoes, severe weather occurred across the West and East South Central U.S. Damaging winds and large hail was reported in Oklahoma, Missouri, and parts of the Deep South. Heavy rainfall and flash flooding was reported in Tennessee and Kentucky.

== Meteorological synopsis ==
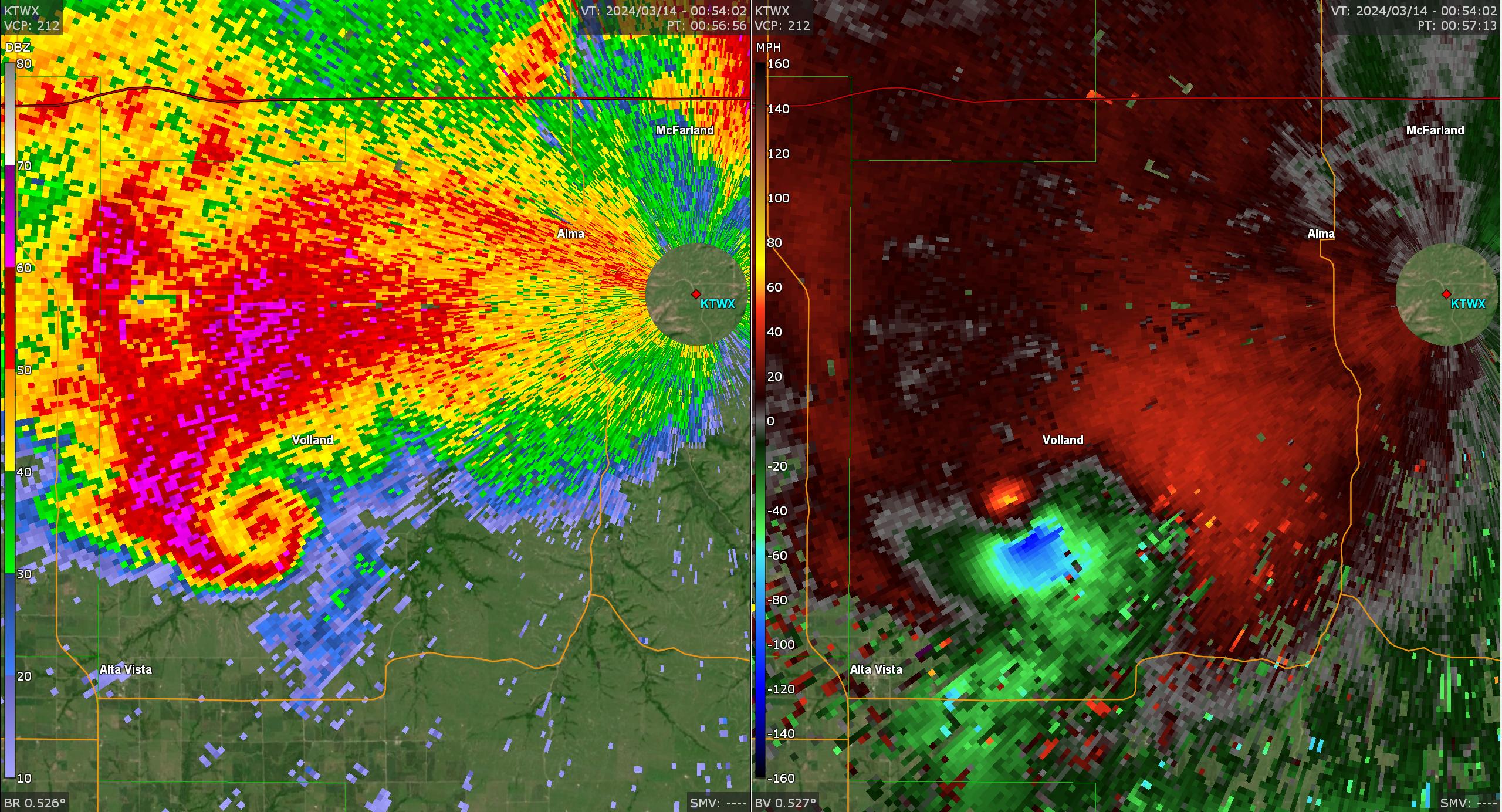
NEXRAD radar imagery of an EF2 tornado near Alta Vista, Kansas on March 13, 2024 (supercell with hook echo on left, velocity on right)

The weather system responsible for the outbreak was evident multiple days prior, but the area that received the worst tornadoes was not expected to be the main threat. On March 9, the Storm Prediction Center (SPC) highlighted a 15% probability area of severe weather on March 14 for areas in northeast Texas and far southeast Oklahoma, indicating numerical weather models agreed that severe weather would occur. Over the following days, model runs began to highlight favorable parameters for severe weather, mainly towards very large hail, damaging winds, and a potential for tornadoes across a corridor that expanded northeast.

On March 11, a Day 3 marginal risk was highlighted from central Oklahoma into eastern Kansas, as well as the Lower Missouri Valley. Forecasters identified deep troughing, as well as possible zonal flow, especially around southeast Kansas for March 13.

On March 12, a Day 3 slight risk was issued for the March 14 event, extending into Arkansas, central Missouri, southeastern Iowa, and western Illinois. Given moderate moisture, strong atmospheric buoyancy, and an unstable airmass ahead of convective initiation preceded by a warm front, supercells were possible, with a risk for all severe hazards. A slight risk was also issued for Day 2 around northeastern Kansas.

By 3:54 p.m. CDT on the 13th, storms began to initiate along a warm front in eastern Kansas as forecast. A shortwave trough was also noted nearby on water vapor imagery, highlighting large-scale ascent favorable for all severe hazards. At around 6:00 p.m. CDT, storms began to mature, and an EF2 tornado produced near Alta Vista, Kansas. Following the tornado in Alta Vista, another EF2 produced in Rossville, before storms began to downtrend through the night.

On March 14, a particularly favorable corridor for severe weather was placed along eastern Oklahoma, northwestern Arkansas, and southern Missouri, with intense supercells capable of tornadoes, damaging winds, and very large hail. The aforementioned area was given a level 3/enhanced risk for severe weather, with a 10% risk for EF2+ tornadoes situated mainly in the area within Oklahoma and Arkansas. In this area, convective available potential energy (CAPE) values reached 2,500–3,000 J/kg, favorable wind shear was present, and elongated, curved hodograph values were expected, allowing any mature supercell to rotate.

During the early morning hours of March 14, the system produced severe weather across areas of Kansas to Ohio. After the initial storms passed, the atmosphere was predicted to stabilize, as the temperature gradient throughout experienced vertical mixing. Because of this, an elongated, wide corridor that extended into Indiana and western Ohio was given a 5% risk for tornadoes, however, the Storm Prediction Center noted that if supercells were able to develop in this region, they could be long-tracked. Supercells were able to develop by the late afternoon near west Indiana and began tracking east and southeast through Ohio, prompting a tornado watch for the states.

== Confirmed tornadoes ==
Confirmed tornadoes by Enhanced Fujita rating
EFU	EF0	EF1	EF2	EF3	EF4	EF5	Total
2	12	11	7	2	0	0	34

=== March 13 event ===
List of confirmed tornadoes – Wednesday, March 13, 2024 (Note: All dates are based on the local time zone where the tornado touched down; however, all times are in Coordinated Universal Time for consistency.)
EF#	Location	County / Parish	State	Start Coord.	Time (UTC)	Path length	Max width
EF2	E of Alta Vista to NE of Volland	Wabaunsee	KS	38.87°N 96.45°W	00:45–01:15	8.14 mi (13.10 km)	300 yd (270 m)
EF2	The tornado remained mostly over rural areas, causing low-end EF2 damage to hardwood trees and outbuildings.						
EF2	WNW of Rossville	Shawnee	KS	39.13°N 95.98°W	01:27–01:46	4.94 mi (7.95 km)	100 yd (91 m)
EF2	Homes and outbuildings were damaged.						

=== March 14 event ===
List of confirmed tornadoes – Thursday, March 14, 2024
EF#	Location	County / Parish	State	Start Coord.	Time (UTC)	Path length	Max width
EF1	NW of Avon	Warren, Fulton	IL	40.686°N 90.463°W	09:36–09:37	1.06 mi (1.71 km)	150 yd (140 m)
EF1	A brief but high-end EF1 tornado damaged farmsteads. Outbuildings and machine sheds were destroyed, grain bins were damaged, trees were uprooted and power poles were snapped.						
EF0	E of Fieldon to WNW of Delhi	Jersey	IL	39.096°N 90.449°W	12:28–12:38	8.65 mi (13.92 km)	100 yd (91 m)
EF0	Minor damage to trees, siding, and roofs occurred.						
EF0	S of Fidelity	Jersey, Macoupin	IL	39.137°N 90.187°W	12:44–12:48	3.9 mi (6.3 km)	75 yd (69 m)
EF0	Minor damage to trees and farm buildings occurred.						
EF0	Charlack	St. Louis	MO	38.7015°N 90.3399°W	12:46–12:47	0.1 mi (0.16 km)	50 yd (46 m)
EF0	Minor damage to trees and houses occurred.						
EF0	N of Birghton to SSE of Piasa	Jersey, Macoupin	IL	39.071°N 90.152°W	12:46–12:48	2.75 mi (4.43 km)	200 yd (180 m)
EF0	Trees, outbuildings, and transmission lines were damage.						
EF0	SW of Carlinville	Macoupin	IL	39.231°N 89.941°W	12:58–13:00	2.13 mi (3.43 km)	100 yd (91 m)
EF0	A farm building, tree limbs, and a residence were damaged.						
EF2	N of Hanover, IN to Milton, KY to E of Carrollton, KY	Jefferson (IN), Trimble (KY), Carroll (KY), Switzerland (IN)	IN, KY	38.7359°N 85.4744°W	17:58–18:24	17.97 mi (28.92 km)	500 yd (460 m)
EF2	This strong tornado formed near SR 256 on the north side of Hanover, causing minor EF1 damage to homes and trees. In Jefferson Manor subdivision several homes sustained roof damage; a newer house had its roof completely ripped off. Garages were heavily damaged, and an outbuilding was destroyed. The tornado then crossed SR 56, snapping trees before crossing the Ohio River into Kentucky, initially uprooting trees and damaging trees at high-end EF0 strength. The tornado reached EF1 intensity as it moved into the River Park Campground, where multiple trailers were flipped. The tornado then struck Milton, where damage to several homes, businesses, mobile homes, and trees was observed. It also moved over the Milton–Madison Bridge (US 421), although no damage to the bridge was reported. The tornado reached low-end EF2 intensity as it crossed KY 36 into Paradise Point, where campers and a motorhome were demolished. One tri-axle camper weighing well over 10,000 pounds (4.5 t) was rolled and thrown over 100 yd (91 m). After causing additional EF1 tree damage, the tornado briefly weakened, causing EF0 damage to trees as it crossed KY 1492 and KY 36. After moving over the Ohio River back into Indiana, the tornado quickly regained low-end EF2 intensity, knocking over and lifting several RV trailers along SR 56. Numerous boat ports had anchor supports pulled out of the ground and outbuildings and small barns were destroyed. In Switzerland County, more barns sustained significant EF1 roof damage. Extensive damage occurred to trees and power lines occurred in this area as well. The weakening tornado then crossed the Ohio River again back into Kentucky, causing minor EF0 tree damage before lifting along US 42. Two people were injured.						
EF0	S of Hoffman	McIntosh	OK	35.4302°N 95.8635°W	18:44–18:47	2.7 mi (4.3 km)	350 yd (320 m)
EF0	The tornado developed just south of I–40, snapping large tree limbs and damaging an outbuilding.						
EF0	NE of Ozark	Christian	MO	37.029°N 93.174°W	20:40–20:41	0.96 mi (1.54 km)	50 yd (46 m)
EF0	Multiple trees were uprooted or snapped. A barn and outbuilding were also damaged.						
EF1	ENE of New Corydon. IN to W of Celina, OH	Adams (IN), Mercer (OH)	IN, OH	40.5732°N 84.8025°W	22:40–22:55	9.34 mi (15.03 km)	450 yd (410 m)
EF1	This tornado formed just west of the Indiana/Ohio state line, damaging trees, shingles, and an outbuilding within Indiana. In Ohio, damage to houses, trees and outbuildings occurred, with several outbuildings being completely destroyed. This was the first tornado produced by the Lakeview supercell.						
EF1	Celina to NE of Moulton	Mercer, Auglaize	OH	40.55°N 84.57°W	23:00–23:24	15.95 mi (25.67 km)	1,050 yd (960 m)
EF1	This large, damaging high-end EF1 tornado began within the city of Celina and moved east, causing minor damage to trees and house roofs. The tornado crossed SR 29 and the circulation grew in size and strength, causing EF1-intensity damage to houses, trees, and outbuildings from west of St Marys to SR 116 east of US 33 north of the town. After this swath, the tornado steadily weakened while moving east, continuing for seven miles (11 km) before dissipating east of Wapakoneta.						
EFU	SW of Alvada	Hancock, Seneca	OH	41.0276°N 83.4217°W	23:09–23:12	1.29 mi (2.08 km)	50 yd (46 m)
EFU	A brief tornado remained over open farmland, not impacting any structures.						
EF3	W of Fryburg to Lakeview to SSW of West Mansfield	Auglaize, Logan	OH	40.5193°N 84.1664°W	23:29–00:16	31.33 mi (50.42 km)	1,000 yd (910 m)
EF3	3 deaths – See article on this tornado – Twenty-seven people were injured. This was the third tornado produced by the Lakeview supercell.						
EF1	S of Mt. Cory to SW of Jenera	Hancock	OH	40.8763°N 83.8087°W	23:30–23:34	3.34 mi (5.38 km)	100 yd (91 m)
EF1	Several homes and outbuildings were damaged.						
EF2	ENE of Muncie to Selma to SSW of Parker City	Delaware	IN	40.203°N 85.3173°W	23:34–23:40	4.47 mi (7.19 km)	175 yd (160 m)
EF2	A strong tornado passed through Selma. Manufactured homes and outbuildings were heavily damaged or destroyed, several homes suffered extensive damage, including some that had roofs torn off, and trees and utility poles were snapped. This storm would produce the Winchester EF3 tornado 10 minutes later.						
EF3	S of Farmland, IN to Southern Winchester, IN to N of Covington, OH	Randolph (IN), Darke (OH), Miami (OH)	IN, OH	40.1785°N 85.1251°W	23:50–01:00	41.34 mi (66.53 km)	700 yd (640 m)
EF3	1 death – See section on this tornado – Thirty-nine people were injured.						
EF2	ENE of New Washington to W of Shiloh	Crawford, Richland	OH	40.977°N 82.8358°W	23:54–00:13	10.29 mi (16.56 km)	250 yd (230 m)
EF2	Trees, power poles and homes were damaged in Auburn Township. The tornado then intensified, damaging multiple residences and outbuildings southwest of Plymouth. A single-wide manufactured home and an outbuilding were destroyed. The tornado then steadily weakened as it passed south of Plymouth, damaging homes and outbuildings, including one outbuilding that collapsed, and snapping trees and power poles before dissipating near Shiloh.						
EF0	Northern Frisco	Collin	TX	33.19°N 96.81°W	23:59–00:00	0.2 mi (0.32 km)	15 yd (14 m)
EF0	A brief tornado formed on the University of North Texas Frisco campus, damaging a few signs and shifting a car. The tornado exited campus and uprooted some young trees before dissipating.						
EF2	NW of Raymond to Broadway to NE of Ostrander	Union, Delaware	OH	40.3718°N 83.5251°W	00:24–00:52	19.48 mi (31.35 km)	600 yd (550 m)
EF2	This strong tornado touched down soon after the Lakeview EF3 tornado dissipated, becoming the fourth tornado produced by this supercell. It quickly strengthened and damaged several homes. A modular home was completely destroyed, with parts of it thrown downstream nearly half a mile. Another home lost a majority of its roof and had its exterior wall collapsed. More roof damage to homes and barns was observed, as well as considerable tree damage. The tornado then entered Delaware County, producing EF1 damage before dissipating.						
EF1	N of Mount Vernon	Jefferson	IL	38.3445°N 88.9175°W	00:32–00:33	0.5 mi (0.80 km)	150 yd (140 m)
EF1	Two metal buildings had most of their roofs removed and all their garage bay doors blown out. The buildings' exterior walls were partially removed. Several buses inside sustained significant damage from debris. Building material was pulverized and embedded in the ground and walls of buildings downwind. A nearby metal building also sustained roof damage. A few large hardwood trees were also uprooted.						
EF2	Hot Springs Village	Garland, Saline	AR	34.6397°N 93.0587°W	00:57–01:19	8.53 mi (13.73 km)	1,000 yd (910 m)
EF2	This large tornado formed just north of the Mountain Valley community along AR 7 where wooden utility poles were snapped, indicating EF2 strength with winds around 115 mph (185 km/h). It continued into Hot Springs Village, causing extensive tree damage consistent with EF2 winds, including snapped trunks and uprooted trees. In this area, homes were primarily damaged by falling trees rather than direct tornado winds. Beyond this point, the roof of a building along the bluff was blown off and thrown approximately 80 yd (73 m) to the northeast. The tornado began to weaken after this point, showing mainly EF1-level tree damage before lifting.						
EF1	S of Delaware to S of Sunbury to S of St. Louisville	Delaware, Licking	OH	40.2599°N 83.0678°W	01:01–01:50	35.38 mi (56.94 km)	600 yd (550 m)
EF1	A long-tracked EF1 tornado, the fifth and last tornado produced by the Lakeview supercell, developed on the west side of US 23, initially causing minor and sporadic tree damage. After crossing US 23 the tornado widened and began causing more structural damage, as houses were damaged, and barns were destroyed. The Olentangy Berlin High School sustained damage to parts of the school campus and athletic fields. Several transmission towers were felled nearby. The tornado then moved into neighborhoods southwest of Sunbury and west of Galena, causing widespread and significant tree damage and blowing out windows. Roofs were also partially removed, and power poles were snapped in the area. Galena itself sustained straight-line wind with embedded tornadic damage. More homes were damaged, and barns were destroyed before the tornado dissipated near SR 13.						
EF1	NE of Fairfield to NNW of Golden Gate	Wayne	IL	38.408°N 88.282°W	01:11–01:15	2.8 mi (4.5 km)	75 yd (69 m)
EF1	A tornado inflicted roof damage to a home as soon as it formed. Moving east, an anchored mobile home was lifted and tipped over, sustaining major damage. Another home northeast of the mobile home had significant soffit and porch damage. An old TV tower was toppled on the property. Numerous pine trees were snapped along the tornado's path.						
EF0	SE of Raymond	Breckinridge	KY	37.9278°N 86.3549°W	03:32–03:33	0.46 mi (0.74 km)	20 yd (18 m)
EF0	A brief tornado overturned a small wood shed and a pile of aluminum housing trim was scattered. Several dead trees were uprooted as well.						
EF1	N of Broken Bow	McCurtain	OK	34.1096°N 94.7424°W	04:00–04:01	0.47 mi (0.76 km)	200 yd (180 m)
EF1	Trees and buildings were damaged by this QLCS tornado. Two homes suffered varying degrees of damage and some outbuildings were severely damaged. There was also roof damage observed to a single-family home and a hotel.						

=== March 15 event ===
List of confirmed tornadoes – Friday, March 15, 2024
EF#	Location	County / Parish	State	Start Coord.	Time (UTC)	Path length	Max width
EF1	New Albany	Union	MS	34.4954°N 89.017°W	08:13–08:15	0.85 mi (1.37 km)	150 yd (140 m)
EF1	A tornado developed in New Albany causing intermittent tree damage. The tornado crossed the Little Tallahatchie River and moved into downtown where the police station was damaged. Deeper into town, numerous trees and structures were damaged, with the most significant damage being observed at the county clerk's office. The tornado caused additional roof damage before dissipating.						
EF0	Southern Belvidere	Franklin	TN	35.1225°N 86.1935°W	09:38–09:39	0.31 mi (0.50 km)	20 yd (18 m)
EF0	This tornado snapped and uprooted a few trees on a farm before striking a neighboring building, where a number of small, unsecured manufactured barns were shifted and one was toppled.						
EF1	NE of Caledonia	Lowndes	MS	33.7102°N 88.293°W	10:04–10:09	2.05 mi (3.30 km)	200 yd (180 m)
EF1	Trees were damaged and downed. Several outbuildings and the roof of a single family home sustained damage and a mobile home lost much of its roof.						
EF0	NNW of Steens	Lowndes	MS	33.607°N 88.3313°W	10:07–10:08	0.64 mi (1.03 km)	75 yd (69 m)
EF0	A brief tornado damaged the roof of a home, a carport and a few trees.						
EF0	NW of Lakeview	DeKalb	AL	34.4187°N 85.9763°W	11:53–11:54	0.19 mi (0.31 km)	77 yd (70 m)
EF0	Roof panels were peeled off of a chicken house. A pole barn was pushed over and another barn sustained roof damage.						
EF1	SW of Rochelle	McCulloch	TX	31.1734°N 99.2324°W	14:07–14:09	0.02 mi (0.032 km)	10 yd (9.1 m)
EF1	A metal barn was thrown onto a neighboring barn.						
EFU	SE of Pearlington	Hancock	MS	30.2°N 89.54°W	18:35–18:37	0.6 mi (0.97 km)	75 yd (69 m)
EFU	A brief tornado crossed the Pearl River on the Louisiana state line. A CSX bridge tender reported a snapped pine tree and railroad signs knocked over, but no damage could be found, and no rating could be applied.						

=== Fryburg–Lakeview–Russells Point, Ohio ===
Fryburg–Lakeview–Russells Point, Ohio
- The large tornado seen near Lakeview, Ohio

Meteorological history
- Formed: March 14, 2024, 7:29 p.m. EDT (UTC−04:00)
- Dissipated: March 14, 2024, 8:16 p.m. EDT (UTC−04:00)
- Duration: 47 minutes

EF3 tornado
- on the Enhanced Fujita scale
- Highest winds: 155 mph (250 km/h)

Overall effects
- Fatalities: 3
- Injuries: 27
- Damage: $6 million (2024 USD)

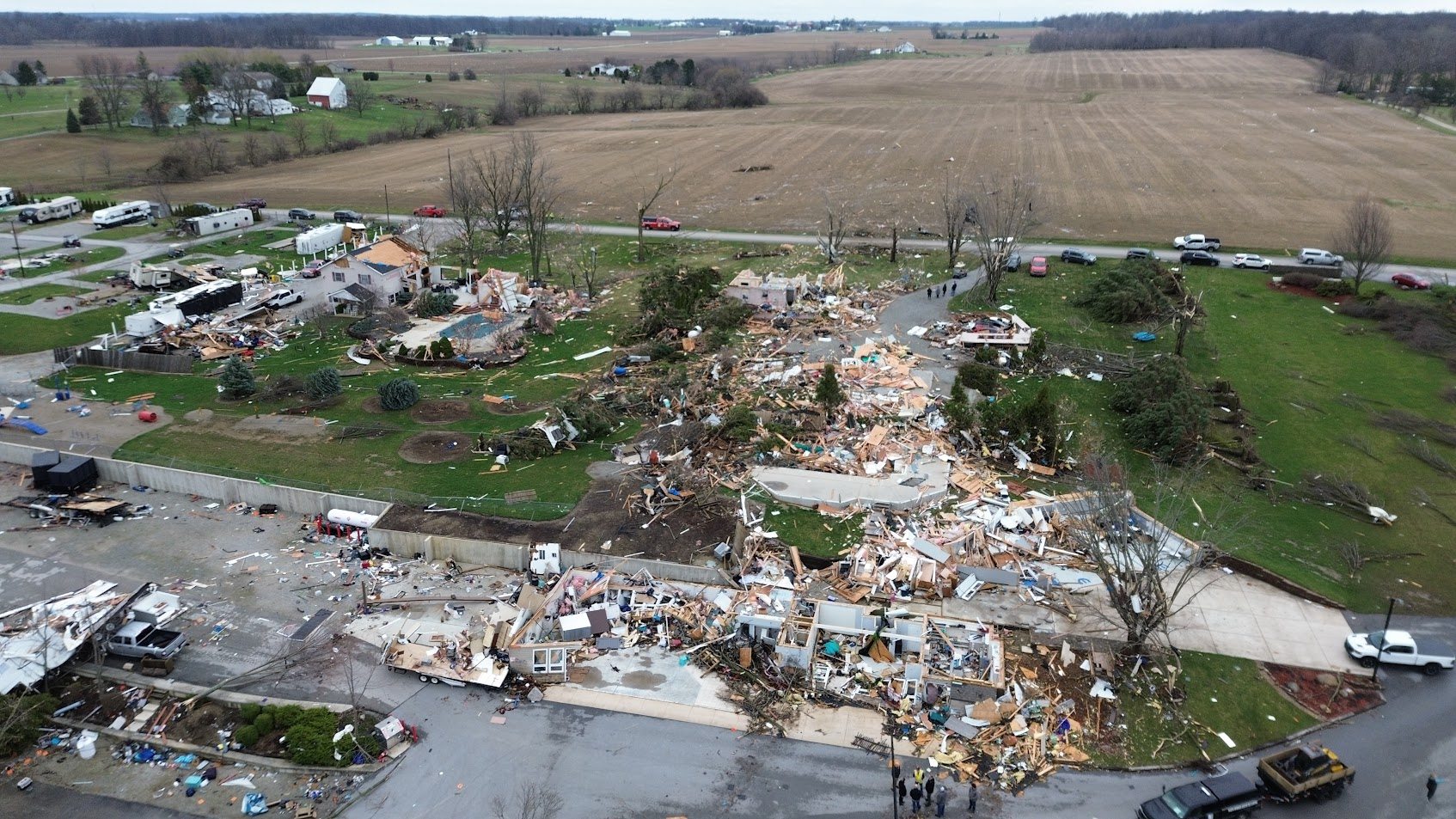
Low-end EF3 damage north of Fryburg, Ohio

During the evening hours of March 14, a long-tracked, deadly, and destructive EF3 tornado directly impacted portions of northwest Ohio. The tornado initially formed just east of I-75 to the west of Fryburg and south of Wapakoneta in Auglaize County, at 7:29 p.m. EDT. It tracked eastward, causing weak EF0 damage to a home and outbuilding on a farm and uprooted trees before beginning a rapid strengthening trend. It uprooted trees at EF1 intensity and then snapped trees at EF2 intensity before reaching low-end EF3 strength and impacting the Glacier Hill Lakes RV Resort. The main office of the resort, multiple homes, and dozens of RVs were completely destroyed, flipped, and tossed. At least three people were injured in this area. The tornado exited the resort to the east, strewing debris across a field and leaving cycloidal marks in the dirt while continuing to snap trees at a weaker, but still strong low-end EF2 intensity. The tornado further weakened to EF1 intensity as it crossed Townline Lima Road and began to deviate to the east-southeast as it passed the community of Geyer and crossed SR 65. Damage along this segment of the path consisted of homes suffering roof damage, outbuildings being damaged or destroyed, power poles being snapped, and trees being uprooted or snapped. As it approached Logan County, it regained EF2 intensity and passed very near Santa Fe as it moved into the county, paralleling SR 720. It caused significant damage to multiple homes, damaged or destroyed more outbuildings, and trees, and power poles. After destroying an outbuilding along Township Highway 84, the tornado reached EF3 strength again northwest of Lakeview, where large swaths of trees were uprooted and debarked. It also caused some damage to another outbuilding.

Maintaining EF3 intensity, the tornado entered the western outskirts of Lakeview. Along Poplar Court, multiple homes sustained intense damage, including one home that was completely destroyed, with its subflooring ripped off. The tornado continued into the main portions of Lakeview. Many homes were completely destroyed, with a majority of the area consisting of manufactured homes. A storage facility was partially destroyed, the local library lost its roof, and multiple businesses along Main St were severely impacted. Past the US 33/SR 235/SR 366 intersections, the tornado weakened some but remained strong at EF2 intensity as it began to parallel US 33 and SR 366 and struck a campground. It tracked directly through densely packed RVs at this location, flipping and obliterating almost every single one there. Past there, the tornado tracked through multiple neighborhoods and mobile home parks in the eastern part of Lakeview, ripping roofs off of homes, damaging businesses, and heavily damaging or destroying many mobile homes and outbuildings. Much of the peak damage along this segment was rated EF2, although one destroyed business received a low-end EF3 rating.

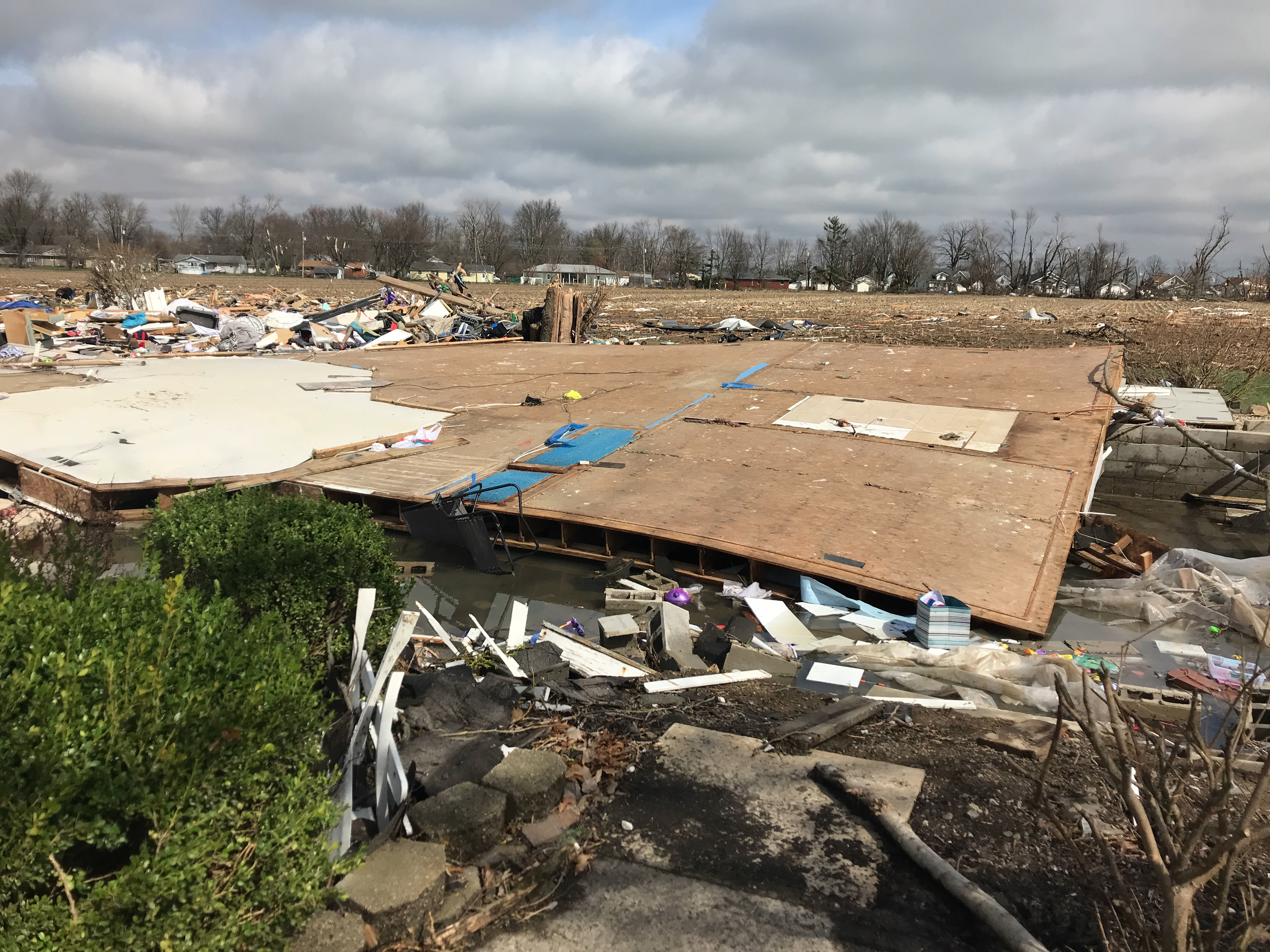
A home that was flattened at EF3 intensity on the west side of Lakeview, Ohio

Past Lakeview, the tornado turned eastward and moved into the northwestern part of Russells Point at low-end EF2 intensity, unroofing homes and uprooting trees in a neighborhood as it crossed SR 366. The tornado reached high-end EF2 intensity again as it crossed over a portion of Indian Lake and directly impacted the neighborhood of Orchard Island in north Russells Point. Devastation paralleled that of Lakeview, with dozens of RVs, mobile homes, and outbuildings being heavily damaged or destroyed, homes being severely damaged, and trees being snapped or uprooted, including at the Fox Island State Park. The tornado began to weaken as it crossed over another portion of Indian Lake before impacting homes in far east Russells Point. Homes near Dunns Pond were particularly devastated with damage to those homes rated EF2; the rest of the damage was rated EF1. The tornado then crossed SR 368 and exited Russells Point to the east.

The tornado then continued southeastward along SR 366 at EF1 intensity damaging homes and outbuildings. It crossed SR 117 north of Huntsville, before flipping a truck along County Road 34 and damaging additional trees. The damage became much more sporadic as the tornado slowly weakened over rural areas east of Huntsville, damaging trees and outbuildings as it approached and crossed over both SR 274 and US 68. After further weakening to EF0 strength southwest of Walnut Grove and crossing SR 47, the tornado dissipated just after crossing SR 292 west of West Mansfield at 8:16 p.m. EDT.

The tornado was on the ground for 47 minutes, tracked 31.33 mi (50.42 km), and had a peak width of 1,000 yd (910 m). In all, three people were killed and 27 were injured, and the tornado did $6 million in damages. The tornado resulted in the Logan County Emergency Management Authorities issuing a mass-casualty event. The National Weather Service indicated that over 45% of Lakeview was damaged or destroyed by the tornado. Additionally, flooding disrupted cleanup and rescue efforts after the storm.

=== Winchester, Indiana/Bradford, Ohio ===
Winchester, Indiana/Bradford, Ohio
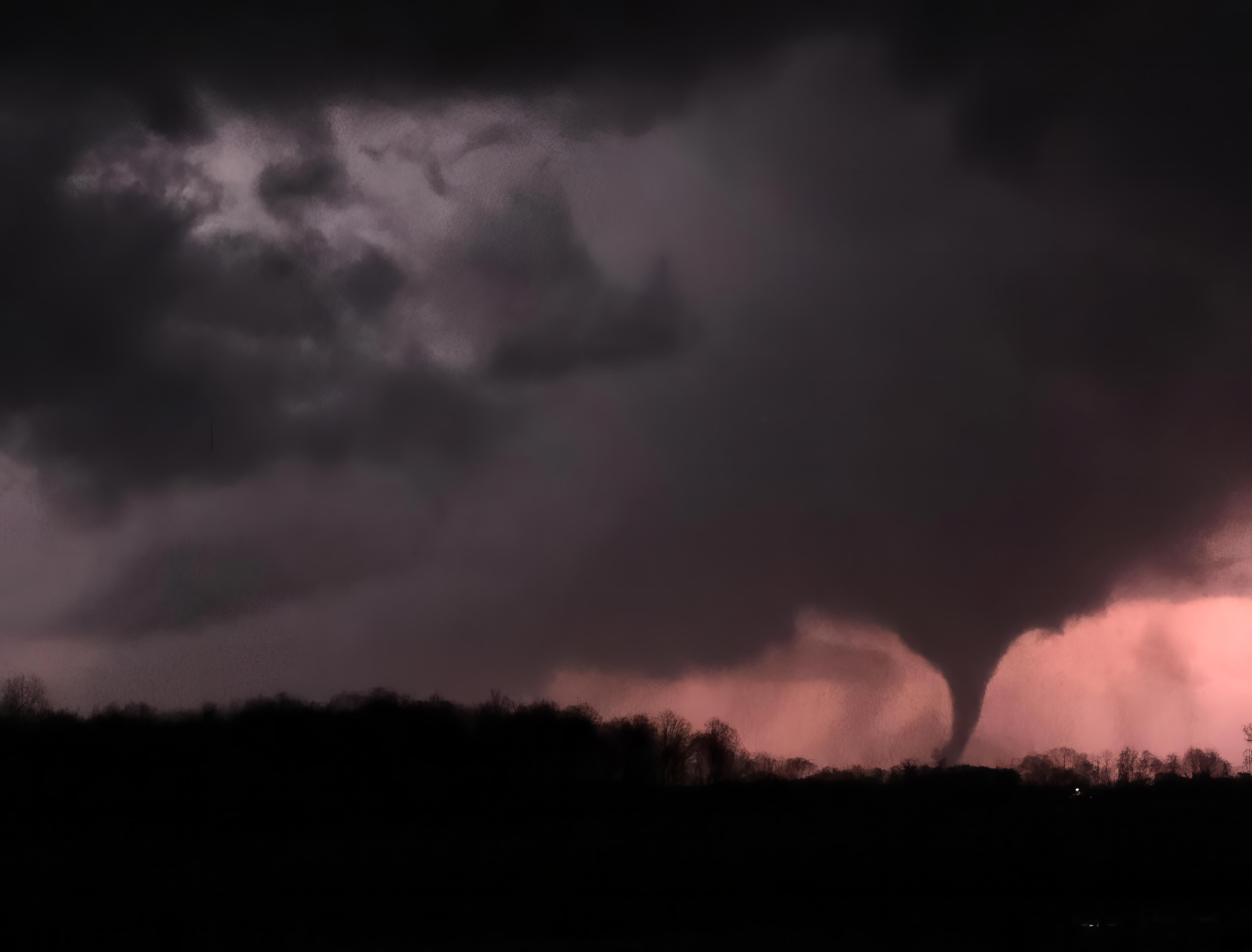
- Image of the tornado, taken from SE of Goodland, Indiana looking east.

Meteorological history
- Formed: March 14, 2024, 7:50 p.m. EDT (UTC−04:00)
- Dissipated: March 14, 2024, 9:00 p.m. EDT (UTC−04:00)
- Duration: 70 minutes

EF3 tornado
- on the Enhanced Fujita scale
- Highest winds: 165 mph (266 km/h)

Overall effects
- Fatalities: 1
- Injuries: 39
- Damage: $26.25 million (2024 USD)

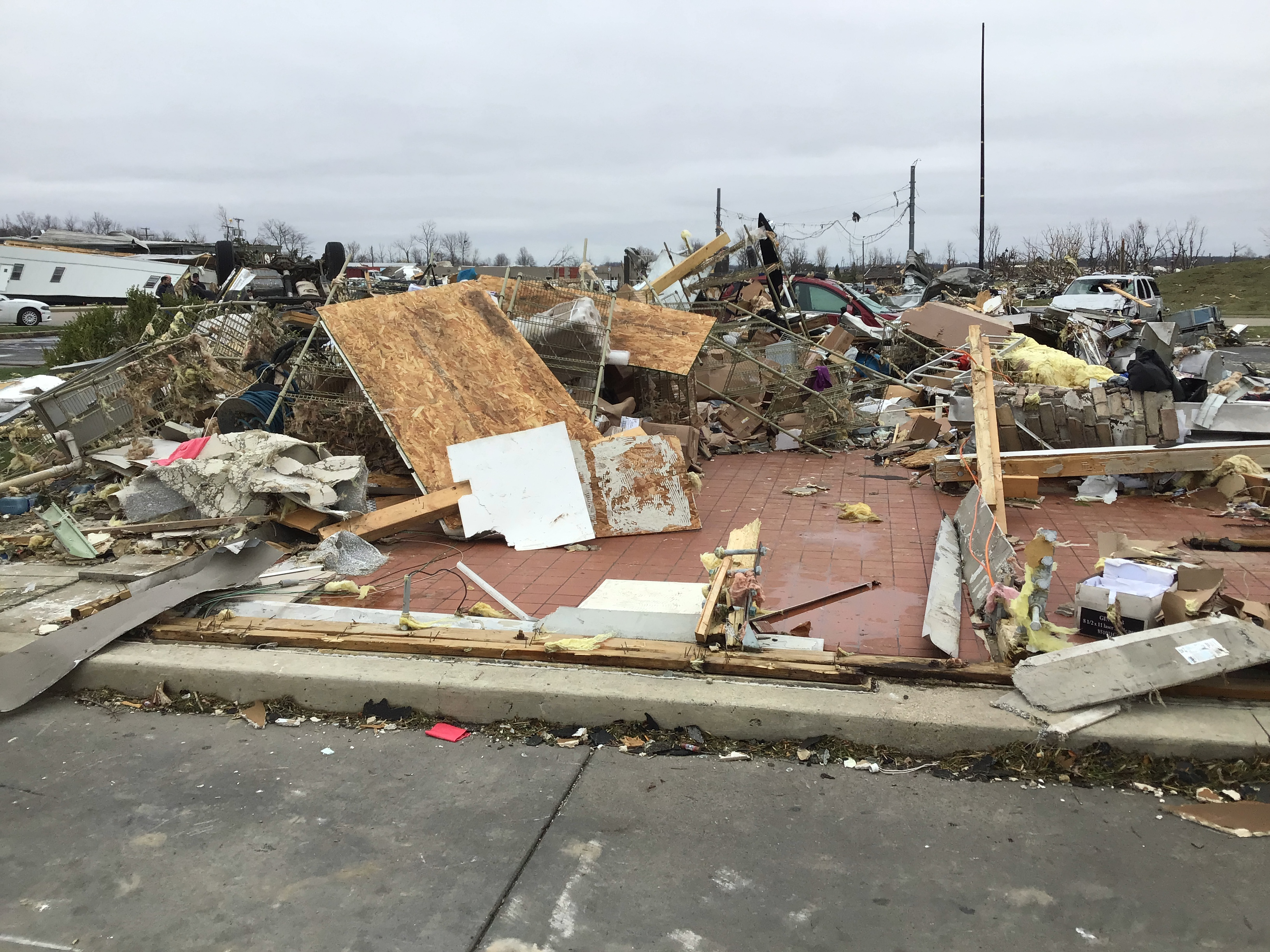
High-end EF3 damage to Taco Bell restaurant in Winchester, Indiana

This long-tracked and destructive high-end EF3 tornado first touched down south of Farmland, Indiana in Randolph County at 7:50 p.m. EDT, causing minor EF0 damage to a few homes and collapsing a barn. The tornado then moved into a cemetery where a few trees were uprooted, and a home was damaged at EF1 intensity. It crossed SR 32, downing numerous power lines, and started to cause ground scouring in the field across SR 32. The tornado continued east-southeast in the field, causing more cycloidal ground-scouring and damaging a wind turbine blade at EF0 intensity. The tornado's eastward movement became erratic as it made multiple sudden northward and southward turns, crossing SR 32 multiple times while appearing to strengthen. A farmstead was completely destroyed, with one home being pushed off its crawlspace and collapsing, although no rating was applied to this damage. An outbuilding at this farmstead was also destroyed. Approximately 40 power-poles were downed as the tornado moved along SR 32 and a roughly 3 miles (4.8 km) swath of intense ground-scouring occurred as the tornado approached the southwestern part of Winchester.

Continuing on its erratic eastward trajectory, the tornado entered Winchester at high-end EF2 intensity. It tore through a subdivision with the worst damage localized along Englewood Drive. Dozens of poorly anchored homes sustained damage, with a few homes having their roofs torn off and exterior walls collapsed. The tornado continued east-southeast through southern Winchester, tearing the roofs off of many additional poorly anchored homes at mid-range EF2 intensity. One home along Browne Street was reduced to its cinder-block foundation, with a high-end EF2 rating being applied. The Randolph Nursing & Rehabilitation Center took a near direct hit at low-end EF2 intensity, sustaining partial roof loss with its debris being wind-rowed into a nearby field. Two vehicles at the center were thrown into this field as well. Other vehicles along this portion of the path were also moved or damaged, and trees and power poles were damaged or snapped.

The tornado then quickly intensified to low-end EF3 intensity as it crossed US 27 and struck a strip mall, which sustained exterior wall collapse with cars in adjacent parking lots also being damaged and moved. Right next to the strip mall, a small, but well-built Taco Bell structure was completely destroyed, with most of the debris being swept off the foundation. A few employees here took shelter in the freezer and survived. A high-end EF3 rating with wind speeds up to 165 mph (266 km/h) was applied to this structure. The tornado weakened slightly, but remained at high-end EF3 intensity as it crossed East Greenville Pike and struck the Freedom Life Church, which was almost entirely flattened with only a small area of interior walls remaining. Wind speeds up to 155 mph (249 km/h) were estimated here. A small park was also hit, with the playground being completely destroyed, and a tree being heavily stubbed and debarked.

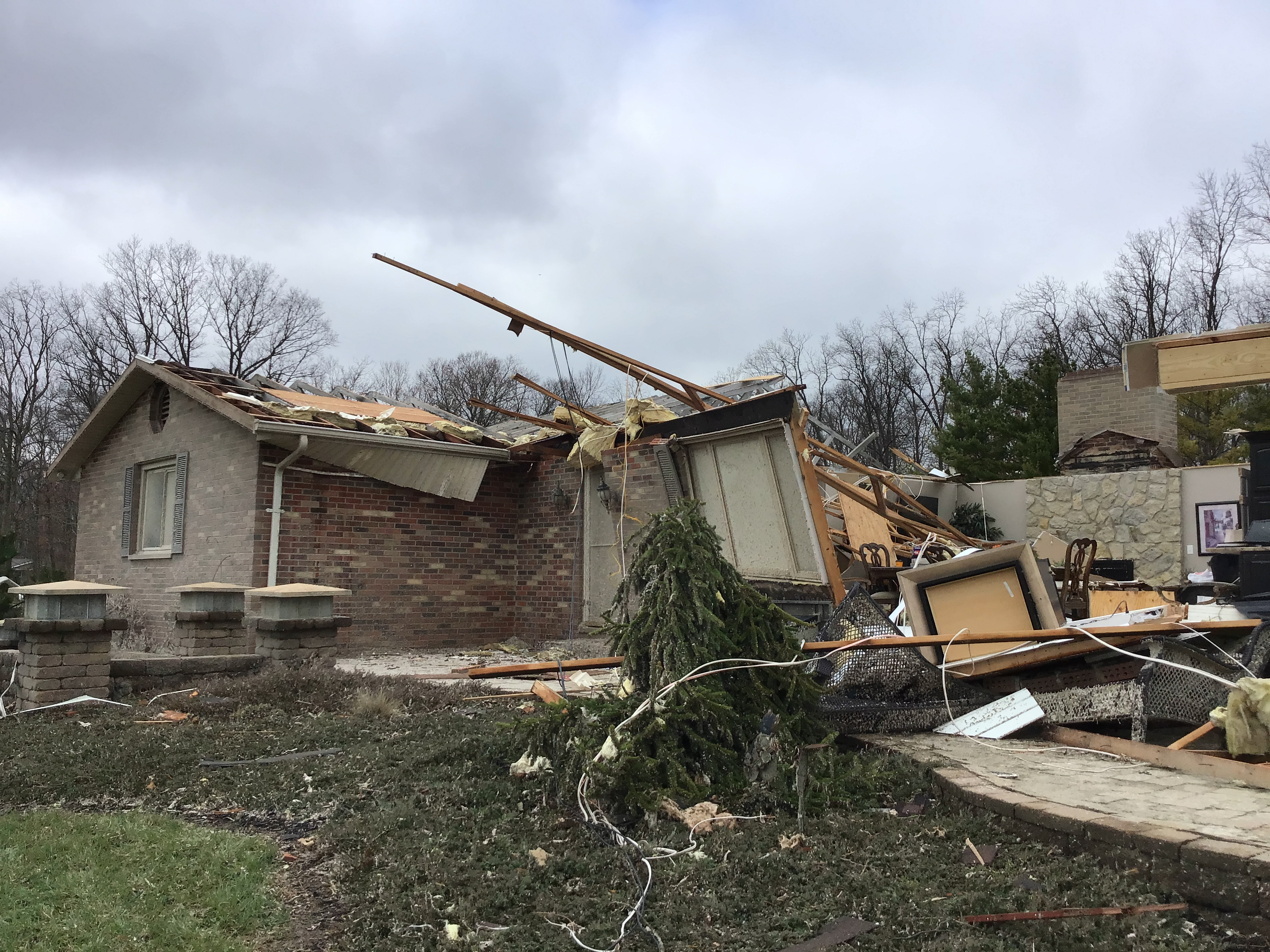
EF2 damage to a home in Newberry Township, Ohio.

The tornado exited Winchester at a weaker, but still strong EF2 intensity and struck a farmstead, inflicting intense tree damage and unroofing a home. The tornado was still causing intense ground-scouring at this point, and this would continue to the Ohio state line. Many farmsteads were hit by the tornado, mainly at EF1-EF2 intensity, with outbuildings being destroyed. Continuing its erratic eastward movement, the tornado passed south of the Randolph County Airport as it moved along Base Road. Three farmsteads east of the airport were completely destroyed at EF3 intensity, with their homes sustaining roof loss and exterior wall collapse. Continuing east, a few more farmsteads were struck, with one farmstead having its grain silos significantly damaged.

The tornado then turned east-southeast and crossed into Darke County, Ohio before once again continuing its erratic eastward movement. In Darke County, several homes sustained roof damage at EF1 intensity, with two people being injured in Greenville Township. The tornado crossed into Miami County, passing just north of Bradford before briefly reaching EF2 intensity again. Two homes had their roofs torn off and exterior walls removed, with outbuildings sustaining significant damage. The tornado quickly weakened and dissipated along SR 48, north of Covington at 9:00 p.m. EDT.

A quick response team used to determine EF ratings possibly greater than EF3 was deployed to Winchester, but no EF4 damage was found by the team. As a result, the tornado was rated as a high-end EF3 with winds estimated at 165 mph (266 km/h). It reached a peak width of 700 yards (640 m) in Indiana, and 250 yards (230 m) in Ohio. The tornado tracked for a total of 41.4 miles (66.6 km) across the two states, remaining on the ground for 70 minutes. There were 40 injuries; one person died from their injuries a month later.

== Non-tornadic effects ==
The system and the severe storms responsible for the tornado outbreak also produced widespread wind and hail damage over the Central Plains, Mississippi and Ohio valleys, and the Southeastern United States. Hailstones greater than 4.00 in (10.2 cm) in diameter fell in Ada, Oklahoma on March 14, including one hailstone with a diameter of 5.25 in (13.3 cm). This was later confirmed as the largest hailstone in Oklahoma state history. Widespread wind and hail damage was reported throughout the Kansas City metropolitan area on March 13, while widespread hail damage was reported throughout the St. Louis metropolitan area on March 14 as well. Scattered wind and hail damage occurred south of Houston, Texas on March 15.

The system also produced very heavy rainfall fell across parts of Tennessee, especially in the central part of the state, between March 14–15. Rainfall totals maxed out at 4.15 in (105 mm) in Leoma and 3.96 in (101 mm) in Hohenwald. The Nashville International Airport recorded 1.20 in (30 mm) of rain while nearby Joint Base Berry Field recorded 1.09 in (28 mm). Two people needed to be rescued from a flooded creek in Lawrence County.

Further west, snow from the storm system on March 13 led to roads on the eastern half of Rocky Mountain National Park being closed.

== See also ==
- List of North American tornadoes and tornado outbreaks
- Weather of 2024
- List of United States tornadoes from January to March 2024
- Tornado outbreak of March 13-16, 2025
