= Milton lizard =

In Kentucky folklore, the Milton Lizard is a creature described as resembling a 15-foot monitor lizard that purportedly sighted in Cable Creek, near the town of Milton, in Trimble County, Kentucky, in the summer of 1975.

The creature was first seen in July by Clarence "Tuffy" Cable, co-manager of the Blue Grass Body Shop, a junk and wrecking yard located north of Milton. As Cable was walking through the junkyard, he saw the lizard emerge from behind the wrecked vehicles and it hissed at him several times. He said it had "big eyes similar to a frog's... Beneath its mouth was an off-white color and there were black and white stripes cross ways of its body with quarter-sized speckles over it."

Cable's brother Garrett was the next to see the creature on July 27. While working in the junkyard, he saw a pile of old car hoods begin to vibrate and move as the lizard's head and shoulders emerged from underneath the debris. Frightened, he left to get his brother, but when they returned to the area, guns in hand, the creature was gone.

The next day, Cable saw the lizard (or one similar to it) again, except this time it appeared to be larger—nearly 15 feet in length. After throwing a rock at it, the diminishing beast hissed at him and fled into some brush. Cable retrieved a rifle from his house and fired into the brush, but couldn't be certain he killed the creature.

In early August, a search party scoured the area surrounding the Blue Grass Body Shop for any sign of the lizard, but no evidence was found.

During the Trimble Banner's investigation into the sightings, Tuffy said the creature looked similar to, but not exactly like, a monitor lizard. He theorized that one of the wrecked vehicles they had acquired in the past from one of the western states contained eggs that hatched in the heat of the junkyard. When wreckage began to be removed in the spring, fewer places existed where the lizard (or lizards) could hide, resulting in the sightings.
