= House on KY 1492 =

- U.S. National Register of Historic Places
- Nearest city: Milton, Kentucky
- Coordinates: 38°41′18″N 85°19′40″W
- Area: 4 acres (1.6 ha)
- Built: c.1800–20
- Architectural style: Federal
- MPS: Trimble County MRA
- NRHP reference No.: 84002031
- Added to NRHP: April 9, 1984

The House on KY 1492, near Milton, Kentucky, was listed on the National Register of Historic Places in 1984.

It was built between 1800 and 1820 and was deemed notable as "an outstanding example of the Federal style" in Trimble County.

It was described in 1982 as a one-and-a-half-story brick house, with brick laid in Flemish bond. Its facade had four bays including a pedimented entrance pavilion. The house was in deteriorated condition in 1982.

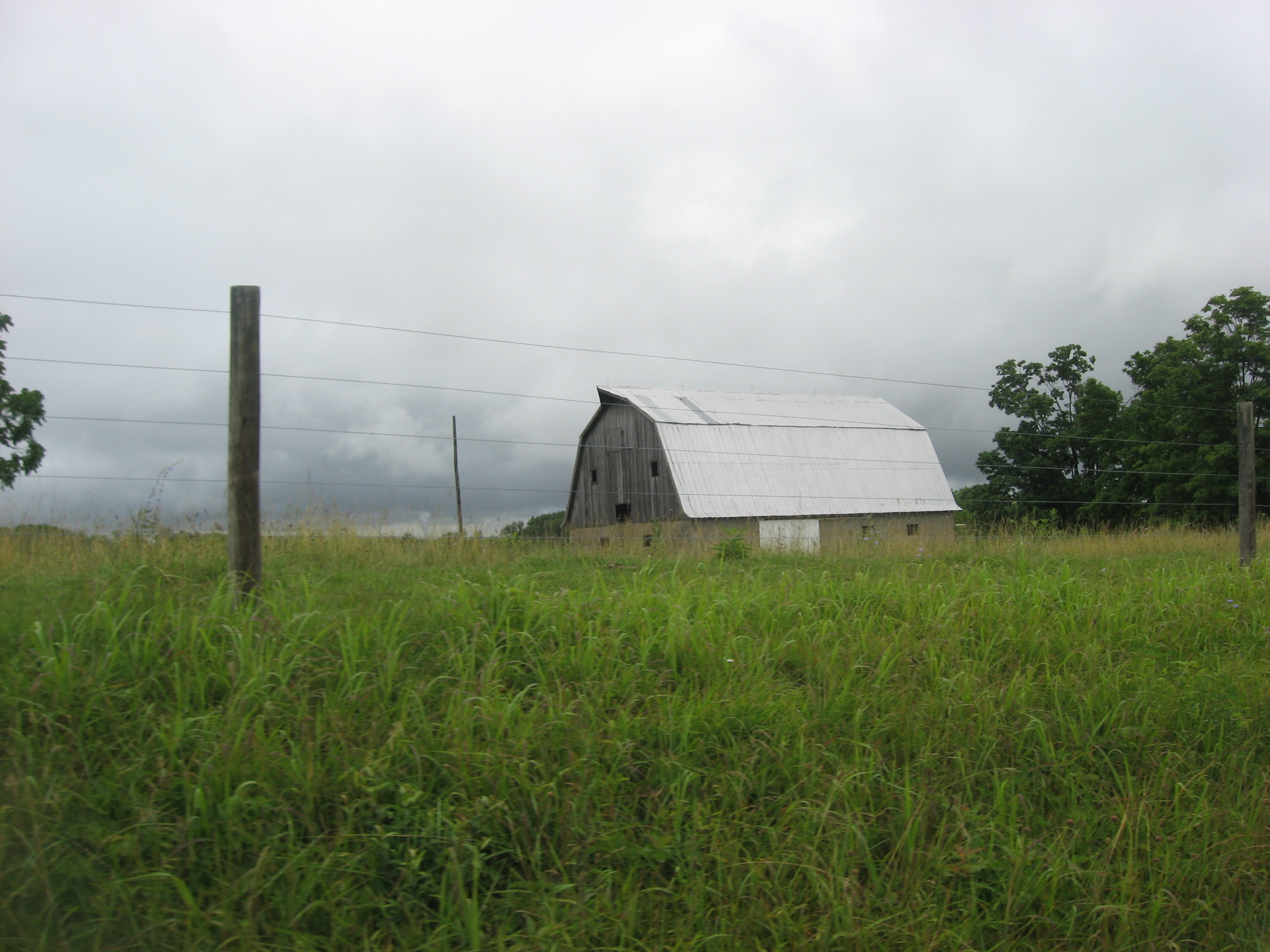
Barn on property

It was located off Kentucky Route 1492. The house appears no longer to exist.
