= Preston House (Milton, Kentucky) =

- U.S. National Register of Historic Places
- Location within Kentucky
- Nearest city: Milton, Kentucky
- Coordinates: 38°37′58″N 85°25′31″W
- Area: 6.5 acres (2.6 ha)
- Built: c.1840
- Architectural style: Greek Revival
- MPS: Trimble County MRA
- NRHP reference No.: 83002887
- Added to NRHP: July 21, 1983

The Preston House near Milton, Kentucky was built around 1840. It was listed on the National Register of Historic Places in 1983.

It was deemed a significant example of vernacular Greek Revival architecture.
