= Ginn's Furniture Store =

- U.S. National Register of Historic Places
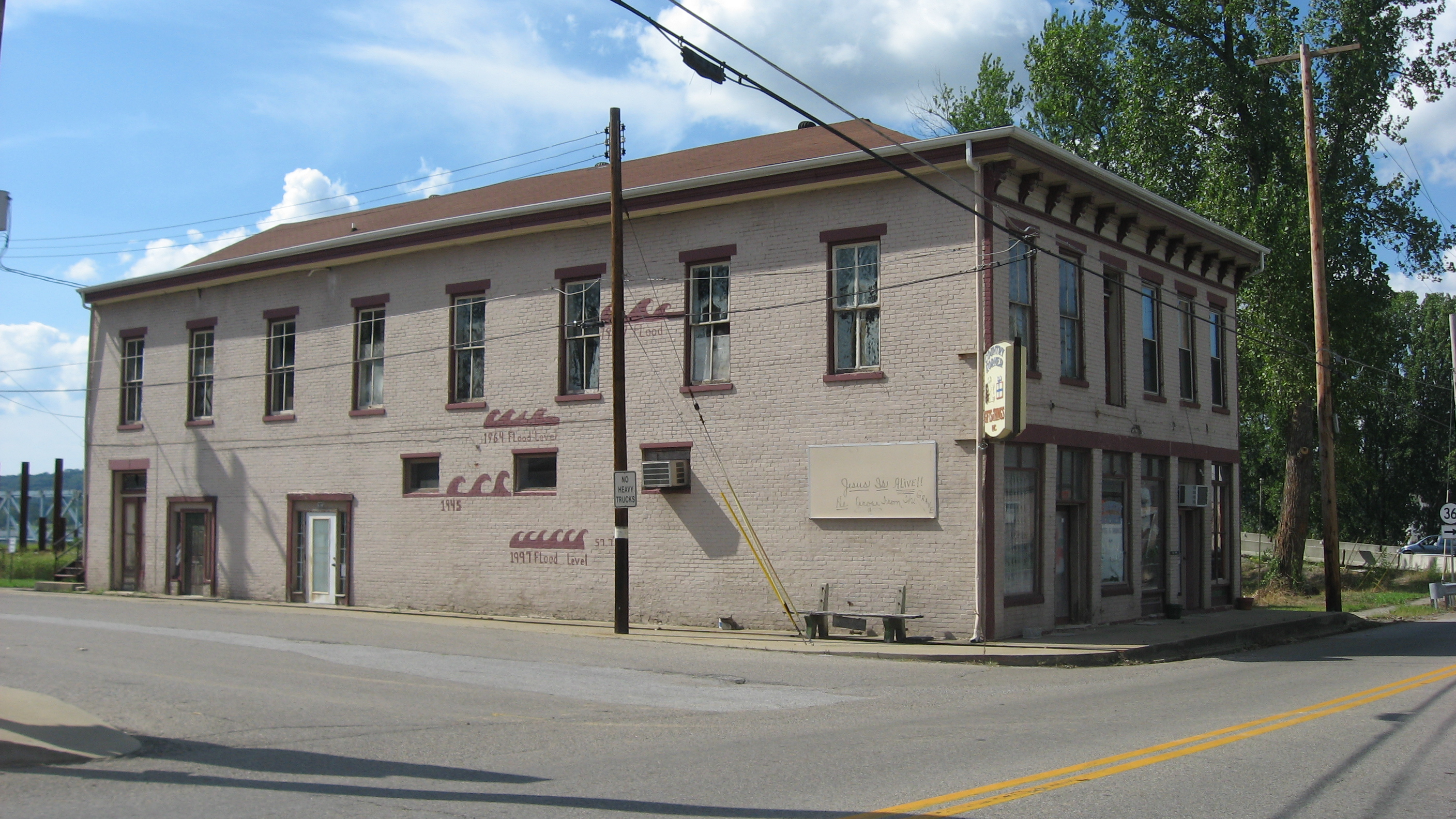
- Side of the store; note the flood markers on the side

- Location within Kentucky Location within the United States
- Location: Main St., Milton, Kentucky
- Coordinates: 38°43′28.6″N 85°22′10″W
- Area: 0.2 acres (0.081 ha)
- MPS: Trimble County MRA
- NRHP reference No.: 83002881
- Added to NRHP: July 21, 1983

Ginn's Furniture Store is a historic commercial building in downtown Milton, Kentucky, United States. Built in the late nineteenth century, it has endured several major floods.

== Historic context ==
Milton and the surrounding portions of Trimble County are a hilly region located along the Ohio River. The area's first settlers arrived in 1785, when it was still part of Virginia, and Milton was incorporated four years later. River commerce was always an important part of the local economy: across the river from Milton is the city of Madison, which was an early commercial center for Indiana, and a river ferry between the two settlements was started in 1804. The two cities have been connected by the Milton-Madison Bridge since 1929. By the middle of the 19th century, Milton's prosperity was evident in its business community, which included a factory, two blacksmith shops, a hotel, and several grocery stores. After the Civil War, economic growth was handicapped: the rise of rail transportation led to a decline in river traffic, and combined with the absence of a railroad in Trimble County, this led to economic weakness, including the closure of a Milton distillery that was the county's only industry.

Despite their economic hardships, Milton residents erected a surprising number of new buildings during the late nineteenth century. Their new construction was typically vernacular in style, in contrast to the high Greek Revival style that was popular before the Civil War. Unlike in previous decades, this period's new buildings often employed various small decorations, many of which were prefabricated; Ginn's Furniture is typical of this style, featuring small elements such as ornamentation on the windows and a cornice with brackets. Unfortunately, most of Milton's historic architecture has not survived to the present. Significant floods inundated the city repeatedly in the late nineteenth century, and almost everything in its downtown was destroyed.

== Architecture ==
Ginn's Furniture was erected on an unknown date in the last quarter of the 19th century. Built of brick on a foundation of limestone, it is one of just two historic brick commercial buildings to have survived to the present day in Milton. The two-story facade is six bays wide and features many large windows on both stories situated between limestone lintels, while the sides are divided into eight bays. Individuals may enter the building through either of two entrances in the facade or through three doors on the side; the latter are equipped with sidelights. The entire building is covered by a hip roof, which is pierced by a chimney near each end. Inside, the most impressive element is a pressed tin ceiling, which is original to the building.

== Preservation ==
In the early 1980s, Kentucky Heritage Council officials travelled throughout Trimble County to conduct a survey of its older buildings for historic preservation purposes. As a result of the survey, thirty-three buildings and one historic district in the county were nominated to the National Register of Historic Places as part of a multiple property submission, and all but one of them were added to the Register in 1983 and 1984. By that time, just six pre-1937 commercial buildings in the downtown were still in existence, including Ginn's Furniture Store. Accordingly, it was one of the buildings listed on the National Register in 1983, due largely to its place as a rare survivor among the earlier buildings in Milton's floodplain zone. Moreover, it was deemed to be the area's most significant building from an architectural point of view — not just downtown, but citywide.
