= Orchard Island, Ohio =

Unincorporated community in Ohio, U.S.

Coordinates: 40°28′47″N 83°53′07″W

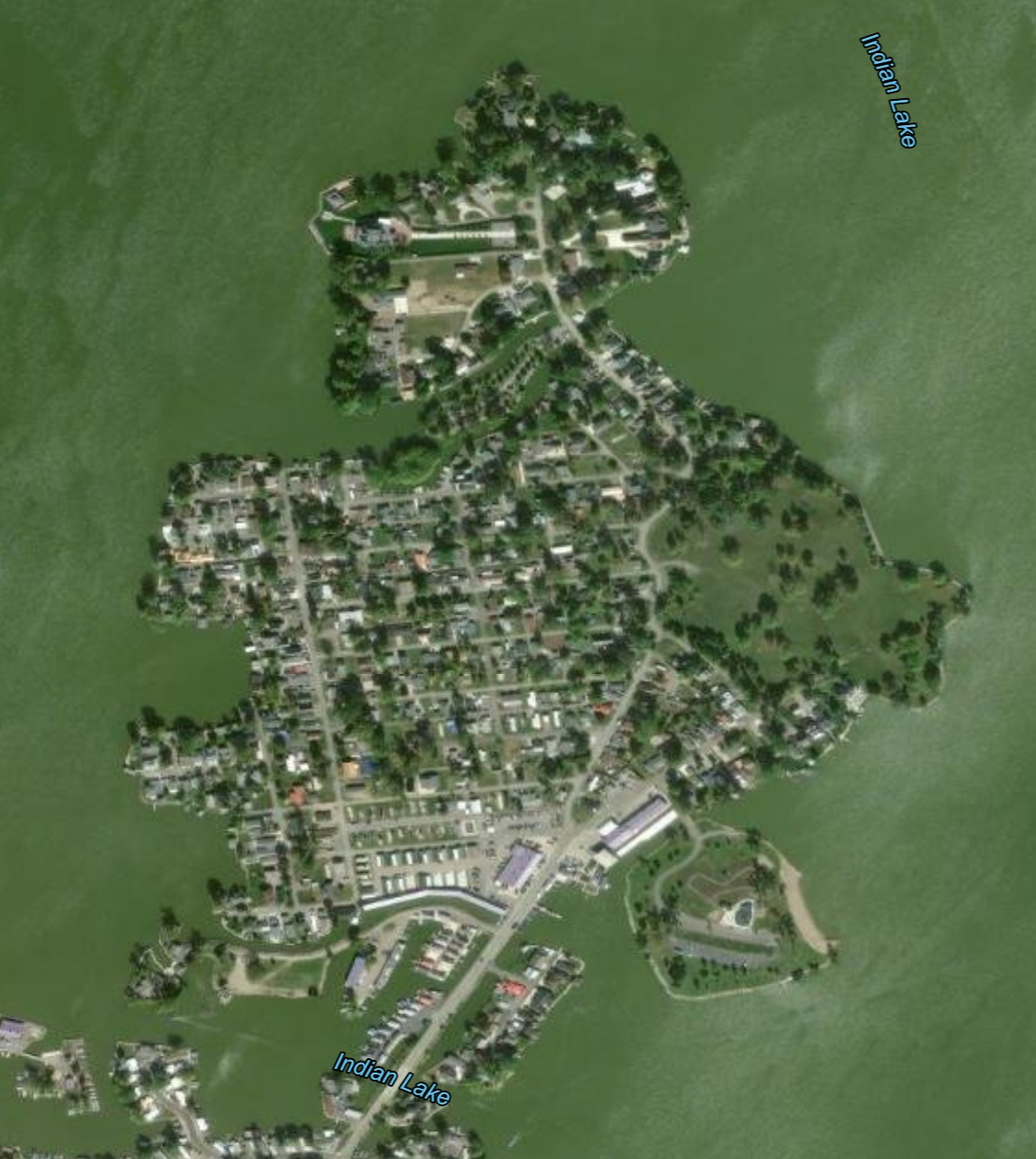
Orchard Island captured with NASA satellite in 2026

Orchard Island is an unincorporated community and residential and tourist area located in Washington and Stokes townships, Logan County, Ohio, United States. Although Orchard Island can only be accessed by road via Russells Point, most addresses on Orchard Island have a Lakeview ZIP Code (43331).

== Location ==
Orchard Island is part of an island chain which encompasses the southeastern shore of Indian Lake, north of Russells Point. Orchard being the largest, neighbor islands include Wolfe, Fox, Willow Bank, and Crystal Beach. At times during the 20th century, Indian Lake was known as "Ohio's Million Dollar Playground." Broadway vaudeville actor Roscoe Ails bought Crystal Beach Island in 1925.

== History ==
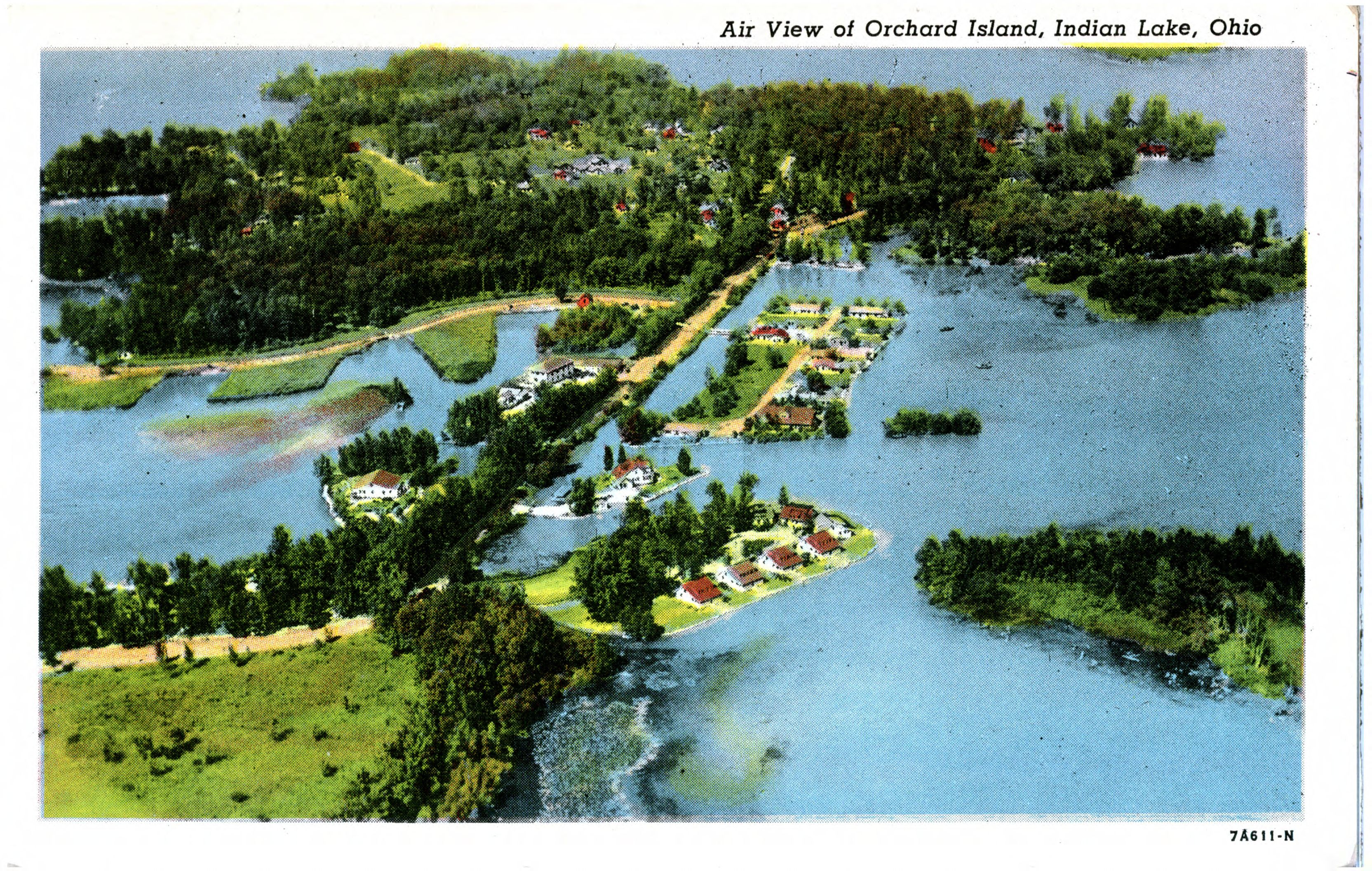
An artist rendering of Orchard Island in the early 20th century provided by the Columbus Metropolitan Library

A popular resort island by the 1930s, investors opened a 100-room hotel, which would later become known as the Wicker Hotel and Resort, and dance hall in the early 20th century, which sprang up around the Crown Pavillion constructed around 1900. The first bridge to the island was constructed in 1901. Tennis courts were present on the island in its early development days.

During this time, the island was home for several assemblies of the intellectual Chautauqua movement beginning in 1910, similar to those occurring in New York. It was home to a Boys City Camp associated with the movement. Notable speakers on the variety circuit who visited the island, among entertainers such as the Bob Royce Orchestra, included William Jennings Bryan and Warren Harding.

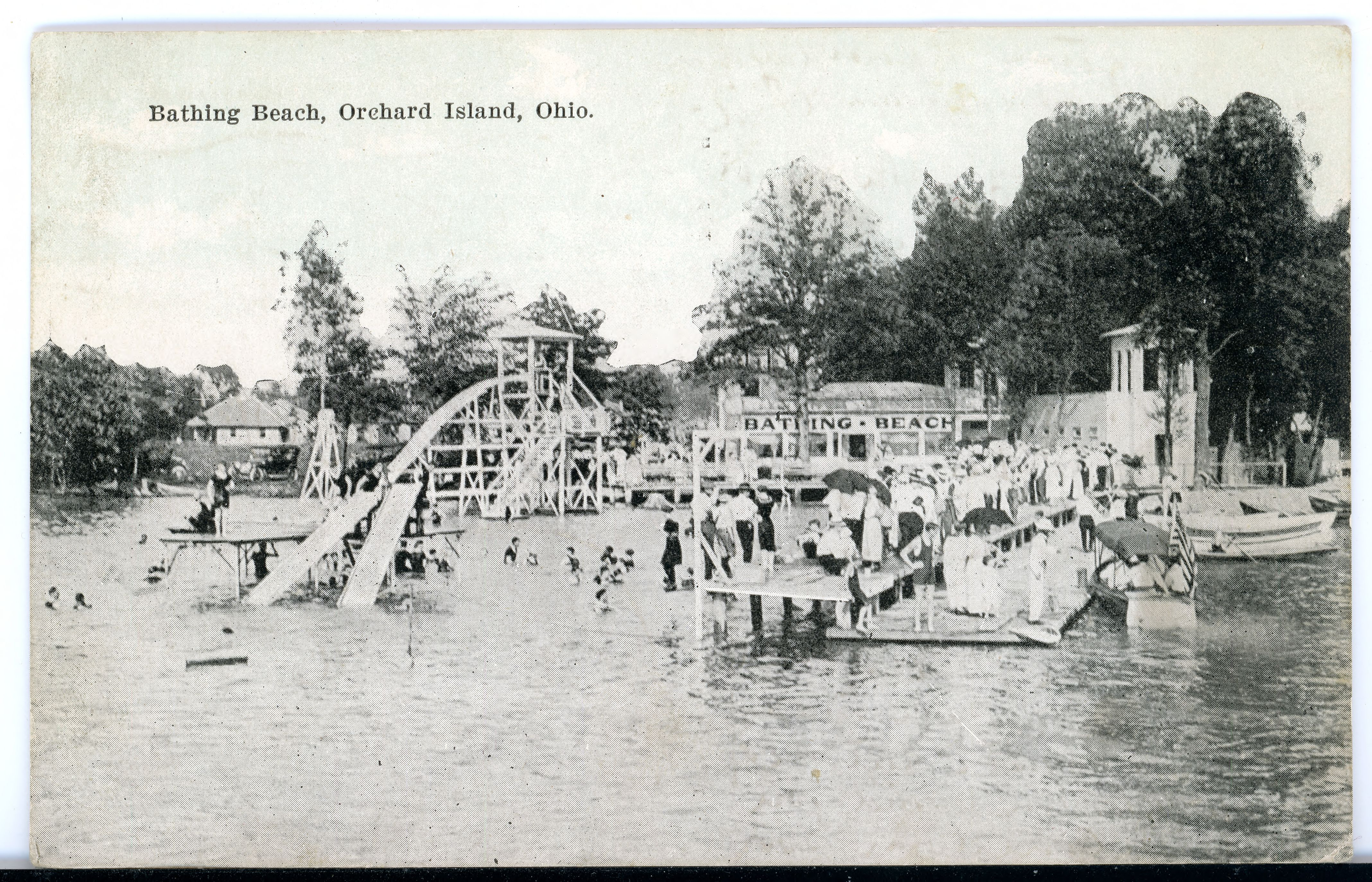
Bathing Beach, Orchard Island, 1921

The pavilion was sold in 1923 to an Ohio corporation seeking to make the island a convention destination. The island, under the ownership of the Orchard Island Improvement Company, which traded on the stock market under the name Orchard Island, Inc., maintained the hotel before the island was eventually partitioned and sold to private individuals. Purchased in 2000, the pavilion was restored over the next few years by the James F. Dicke Family, who demolished the remaining Wicker Hotel and Resort.

In the mid-1920s, the Orchard Island Sailing Club was formed by military contractor and inventor Louis Zerbee, eventually becoming the modern Indian Lake Yacht Club, which still exists today.

In the 1930s, Karl Stumpp built a 15-room hotel and resort called Shore Gables, which was demolished in the 1990s, and along with the hotel opened a grocery store.

In 2004, after 77 years, the United States Post Office reopened on the island.

Today the island hosts the annual Orchard Island Golf Cart Parade, and island residents the DePasquale Family are known to appear on the lake in their Quandt Group West German-manufactured Amphicar. They are longtime members of the International Amphicar Owners Club, headquartered on the island.

=== 2024 tornado ===
The community of Orchard Island suffered a direct hit from a destructive tornado on March 14, 2024 at roughly 7:50PM Eastern Standard Time. Several other nearby communities were also impacted by this same long-track, considerable sized tornado, such as Russell's Point. As many as three fatalities and many injuries were reported as a result of the tornado, which was later identified by NWS damage survey teams as an EF-3.

== Economy ==
The island is home to several marinas and aquatic recreation establishments. Real estate accounts for a share of the economic activity, with many estates, chalets, and cottages serving as rental property for tourists during the peak summer season.
