= William L. Coleman House =

- U.S. National Register of Historic Places
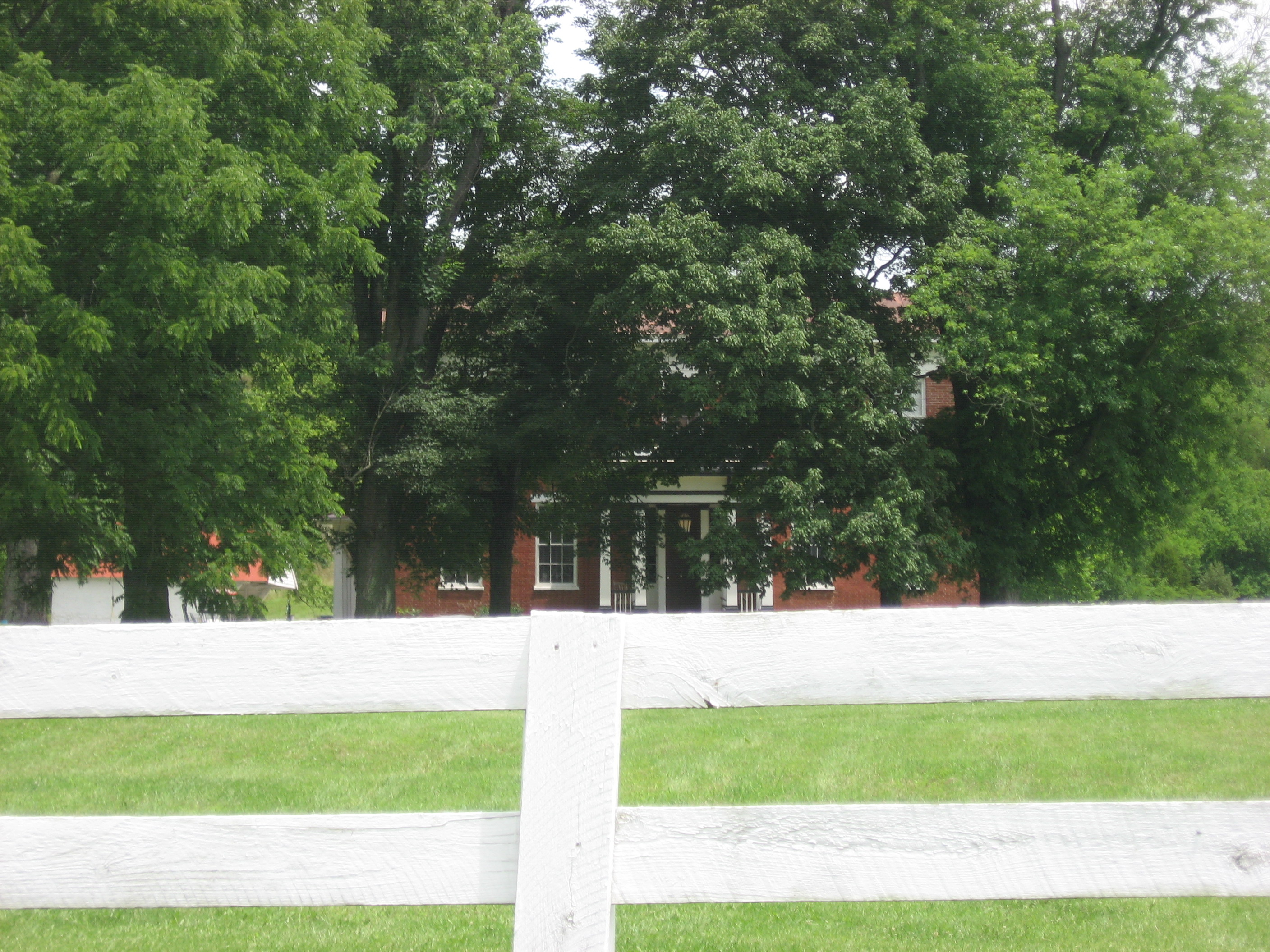

- Location within Kentucky Location within the United States
- Location: Sulphur-Bedford Rd., near Bedford, Kentucky
- Coordinates: 38°32′42″N 85°17′56″W
- Area: 6 acres (2.4 ha)
- Built: 1857
- Architectural style: Greek Revival
- MPS: Trimble County MRA
- NRHP reference No.: 83002879
- Added to NRHP: July 21, 1983

The William L. Coleman House, near Bedford, Kentucky, was listed on the National Register of Historic Places in 1983.

It was built in 1857 in Greek Revival style. It is a two-story brick building with a two-story brick ell. It was built by William L. Coleman, who served as a Confederate officer in the American Civil War. The house, with accompanying farm, was acquired by the three Pierce brothers in 1870.

The listing included four contributing buildings and a contributing structure.

== See also ==
- Coleman House (Bedford, Kentucky), also listed on the National Register
