= Milton Masonic Lodge and County General Store =

- U.S. National Register of Historic Places
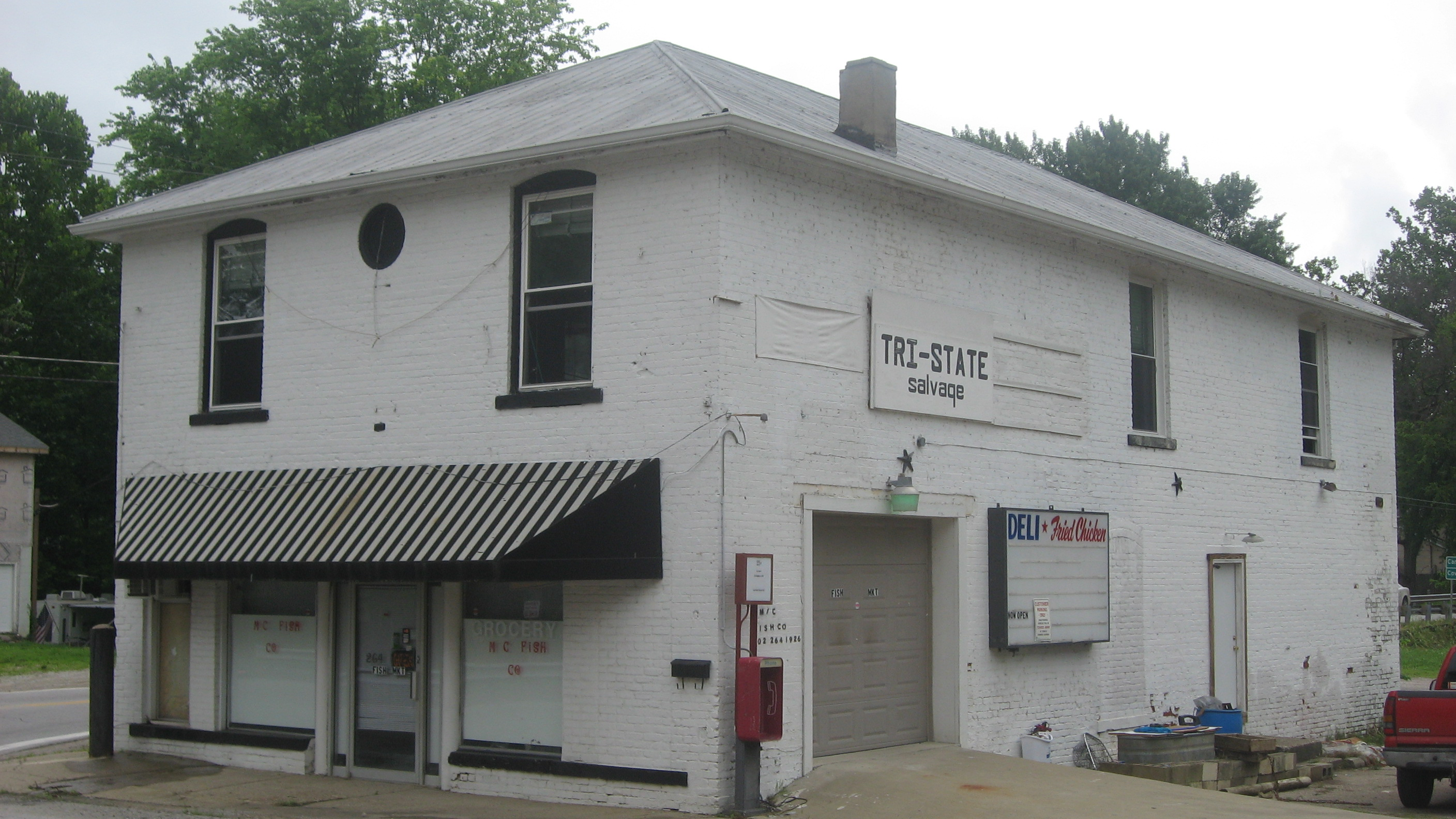

- Location within Kentucky Location within the United States
- Location: Main St., Milton, Kentucky
- Coordinates: 38°43′29″N 85°22′08″W
- Area: 0.5 acres (0.20 ha)
- Built: c.1875-1899
- MPS: Trimble County MRA
- NRHP reference No.: 83002884
- Added to NRHP: July 21, 1983

The Milton Masonic Lodge and County General Store in Milton, Kentucky was listed on the National Register of Historic Places in 1983.

It is a two-story three-bay brick building with a hipped roof, built in the last quarter of the 19th century for the Masonic Lodges in Milton, with first-floor commercial space. It continued to serve as a lodge hall through the date of its NRHP listing.
