= Coleman House (Bedford, Kentucky) =

- U.S. National Register of Historic Places
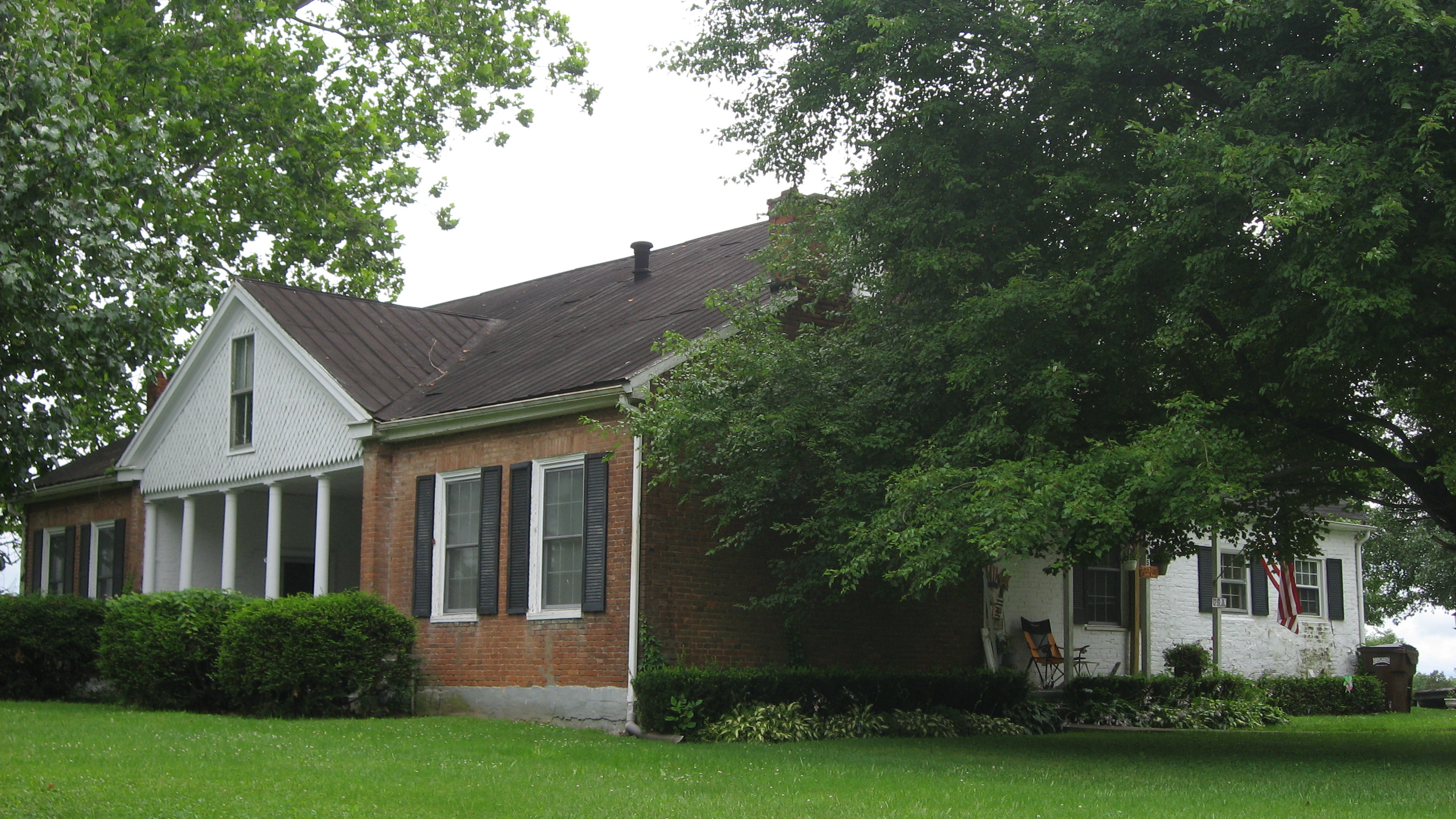
- Location: Main St., Bedford, Kentucky
- Coordinates: 38°35′27″N 85°19′08″W
- Area: 2 acres (0.81 ha)
- Architectural style: Federal
- MPS: Trimble County MRA
- NRHP reference No.: 83002880
- Added to NRHP: July 21, 1983

The Coleman House is an historic house located in Bedford, Kentucky, it was listed on the National Register of Historic Places in 1983.

It was deemed the "most outstanding example of a Federal style dwelling in Bedford, as well as the county."

== See also ==
- William L. Coleman House, also in Bedford and also listed on the National Register
