= Milton–Madison Bridge =

Bridge over the Ohio River between Milton, Kentucky, and Madison, Indiana

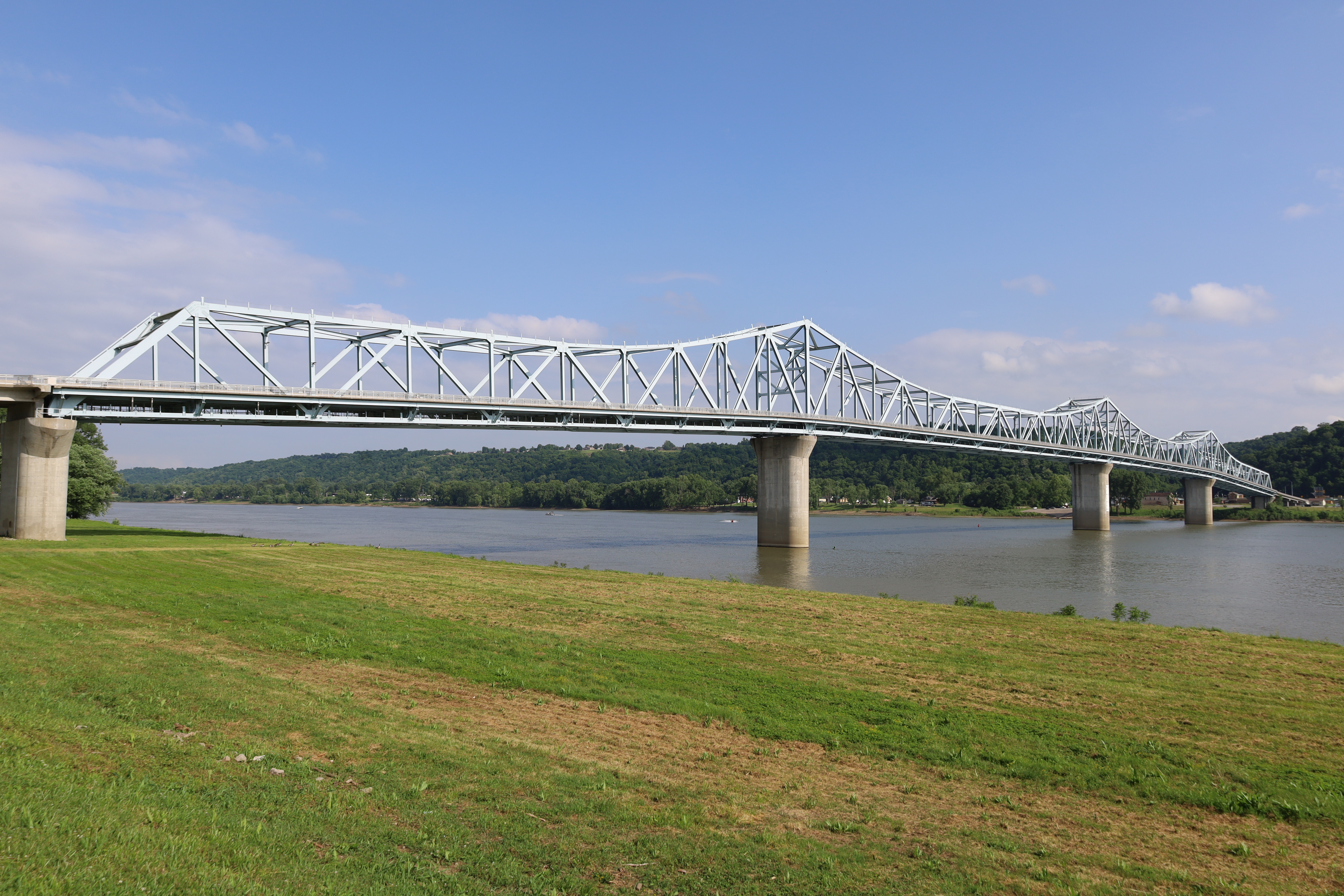
- The bridge in 2024
- Coordinates: 38.729128°N 85.370114°W
- Carries: 2 lanes of US 421
- Crosses: Ohio River
- Locale: Milton, Kentucky and Madison, Indiana
- Other name: Madison–Milton Bridge
- Maintained by: Kentucky Transportation Cabinet

Characteristics
- Total length: 3,184 feet (970 m)
- Width: 20 feet (6.1 m) (original bridge); 40 feet (12 m) plus 5 feet (1.5 m) sidewalk (current bridge)
- Longest span: 220 m

History
- Opened: 1929 (original bridge); 2014 (current bridge)

Statistics
- Daily traffic: 3,498/day
- Toll: none

Location
- Interactive map of Milton–Madison Bridge

The Milton–Madison Bridge (also known as the Harrison Street Bridge) is a continuous truss bridge that carries U.S. Route 421 over the Ohio River between Milton, Kentucky and Madison, Indiana.

== Description ==
The new bridge has a 40-foot (12 m)-wide road bed, plus a 5-foot (1.5 m) cantilevered pedestrian-only path. Bicyclists are banned from the sidewalk, but may use the new bridge's 8-foot (2.4 m) shoulders. The new bridge also features an ADA-compliant pedestrian walkway.

This bridge is the only vehicular crossing of the Ohio River for 26 miles (42 km) going upstream (the Markland Bridge near Vevay, Indiana) and 32 miles (51 km) downstream (the Lewis and Clark Bridge in northeast Louisville). The bridge provides the shortest distance between Indianapolis, Indiana, and Lexington, Kentucky.

== Original bridge ==
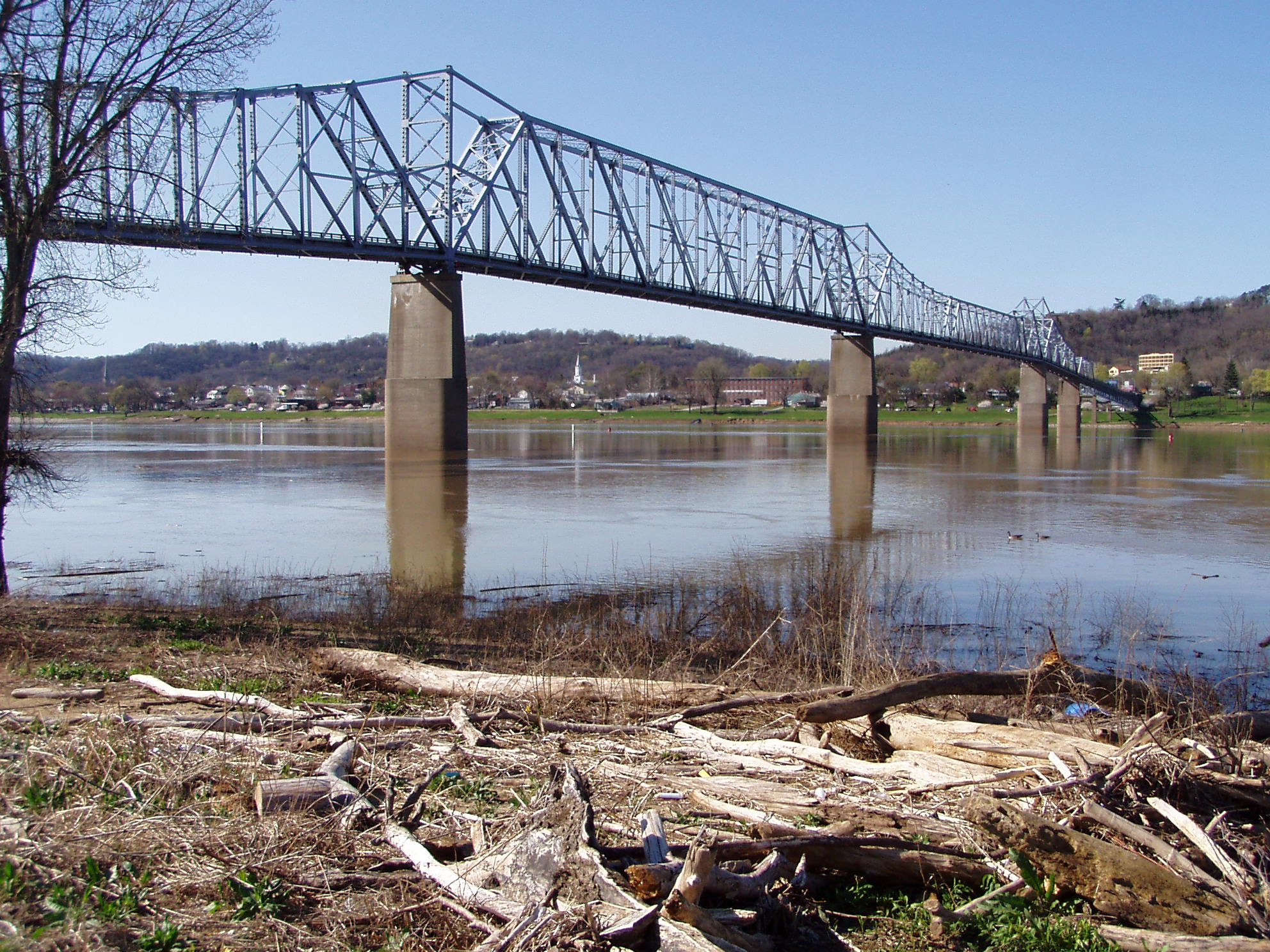
The original bridge in 2005

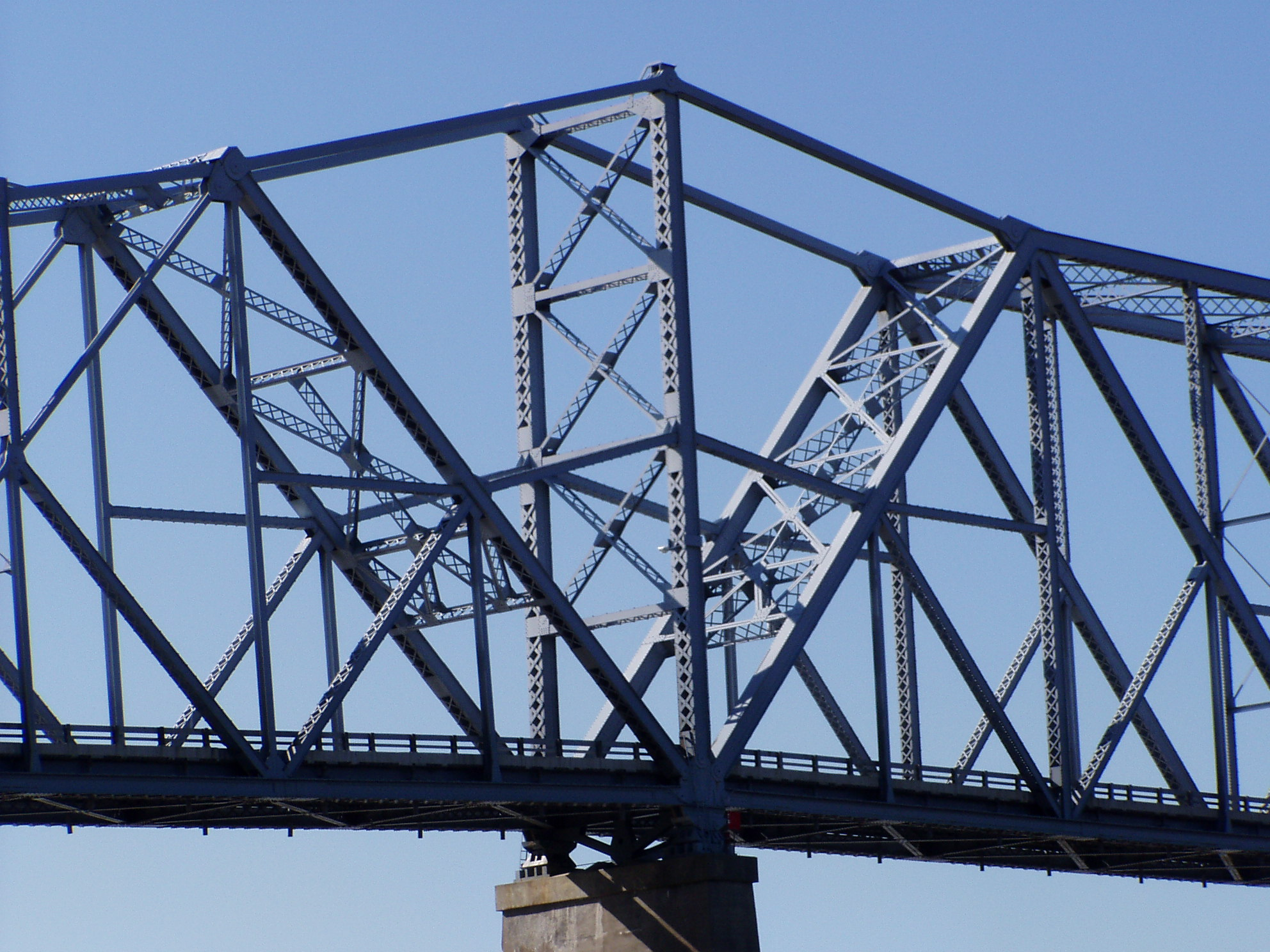
Detail of ironwork on the bridge in 2005

The original bridge had two lanes and a main span of 600 feet (180 m) and total length of 3,184.2 feet (970.5 m). The original bridge had a deck width of a mere 20 feet (6.1 m), and above the deck the vertical clearance was 16.8 feet (5.1 m).

Built by J.G. White Engineering Corp., construction was started in 1928, and completed in 1929, at the cost of $1,365,101.84. It was opened for traffic on December 20, 1929. During the winter of 1933, the bridge was briefly closed for three days due to ice accumulation on the lower truss members, marking the first recorded weather-related closure in its history.

In 1939, the bridge was purchased by the state of Kentucky. Originally a toll bridge, on November 1, 1947, at noon the toll was removed. In 1970, Kentucky sold rights to the side of the bridge in Indiana to that state.

In 1997 the bridge was refurbished with a new deck and other improvements. This was after a 1995 study which could not agree on a new bridge location, so $10 million was used for the refurbishment.

By 2009, the original bridge was considered functionally obsolete and structurally deficient. It had a sufficiency rating of 33 out of a possible 100; its superstructure condition rating was considered "poor". Modern trucks were unable to safely use the old bridge. It carried approximately 10,000 cars a day.

== Current bridge ==
=== Planning and construction ===
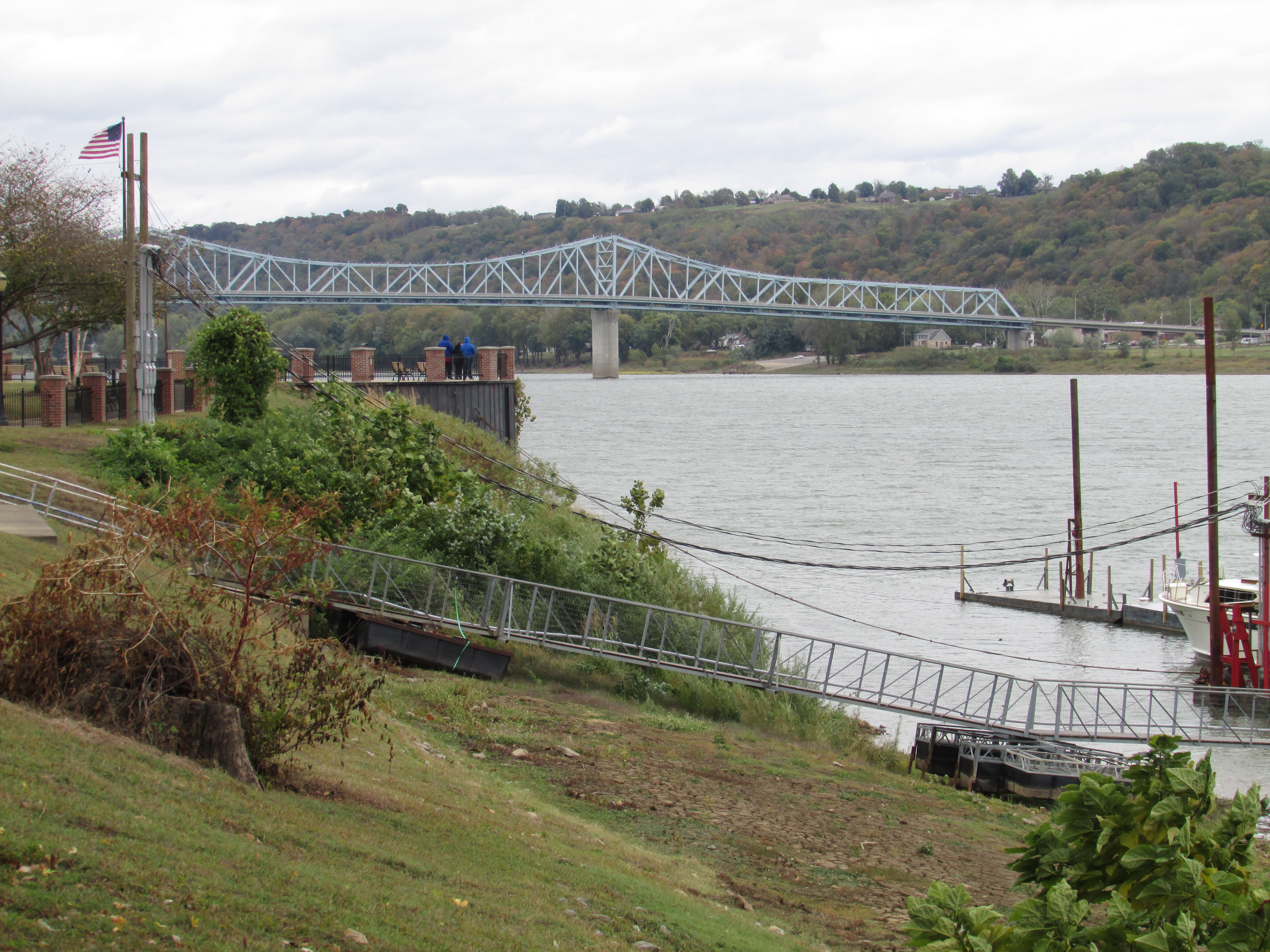
The new bridge in 2019

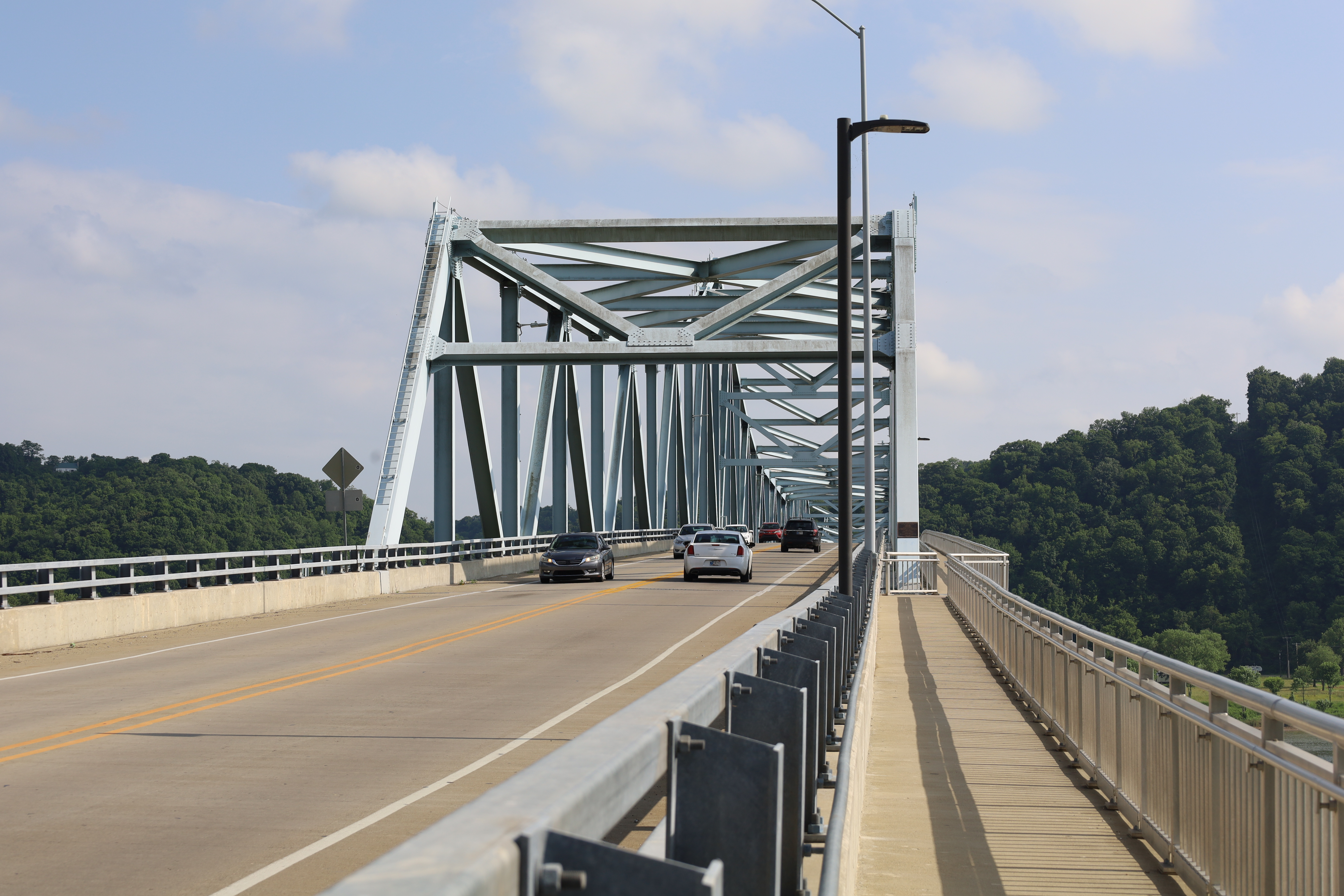
Deck of the new bridge in 2024

A Milton–Madison bridge study was begun by the Indiana Department of Transportation and Kentucky Transportation Cabinet on August 26, 2008. The study had to take in account the Madison Historic District, which is a National Historic Landmark, and the National Environmental Policy Act. As of 2009, one of the boons of the new bridge would be to aid a $20 million "resort and entertainment center" where a cotton mill once stood. The Indiana Department of Transportation (INDOT), in a partnership with the Kentucky Transportation Cabinet (KYTC), designed a new bridge to replace the original bridge. The new project was headed mostly by INDOT.

The old structure was replaced with a completely new continuous truss which was constructed on temporary piers adjacent to the operational span between 2011 and 2012. The original bridge was removed except for several piers in the waterway, which were rehabilitated and widened. A new, wider 3,181-foot-long (970 m) steel-truss superstructure was slid into place along steel rails and plates, a construction method called "truss sliding." Scour mitigation was also performed on the existing piers.

Construction for the new bridge began in the fall of 2010, with the old bridge remaining open during work on the piers. Walsh Construction Company planned to close the bridge for only 10 days during construction rather than an anticipated year-long closure. Emergency ferry service during the 2012 and 2014 bridge closure periods was provided by Madison, Indiana-based, Madison Milton Ferry LLC, in partnership with Anderson Ferry of Hebron, Kentucky. Passenger ferry service was provided by Madison-based Rockin Thunder Jet Boat Rides LLC during the bridge closure for the final slide. In 15 days over 4000 passengers and 12 dogs were transported in a 6-passenger Jet Boat between Milton Kentucky and Madison Indiana.

On March 11, 2014, only four days before the truss slide was scheduled to begin, construction workers were installing a mechanism to facilitate the slide when a steel bearing on the southeast corner of the bridge dislodged, causing the bridge to drop by at least 1 foot (30 cm) and injuring one worker. Work was conducted to replace the steel bearing ten days later.

=== Opening ===
The new crossing opened to vehicle traffic at 7:20 PM on April 17, 2014, and a pedestrian sidewalk opened on October 30 of that year. The cost of the replacement was $103.7 million.

== Gallery ==
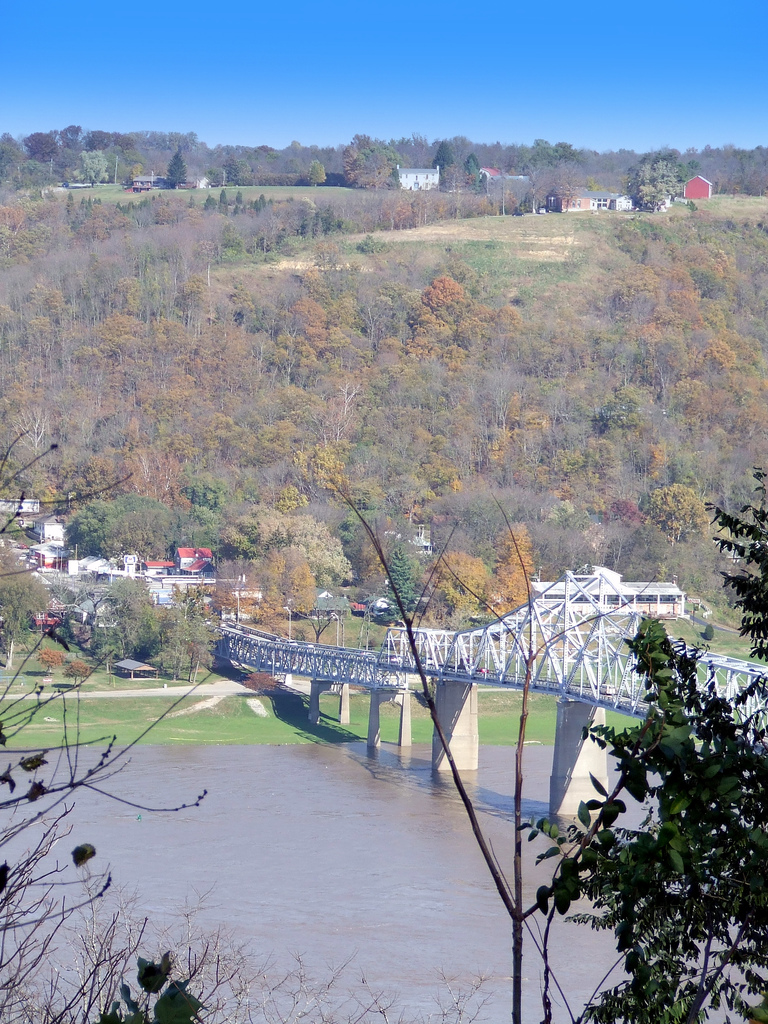
Original bridge as seen from Milton, Kentucky in 2006

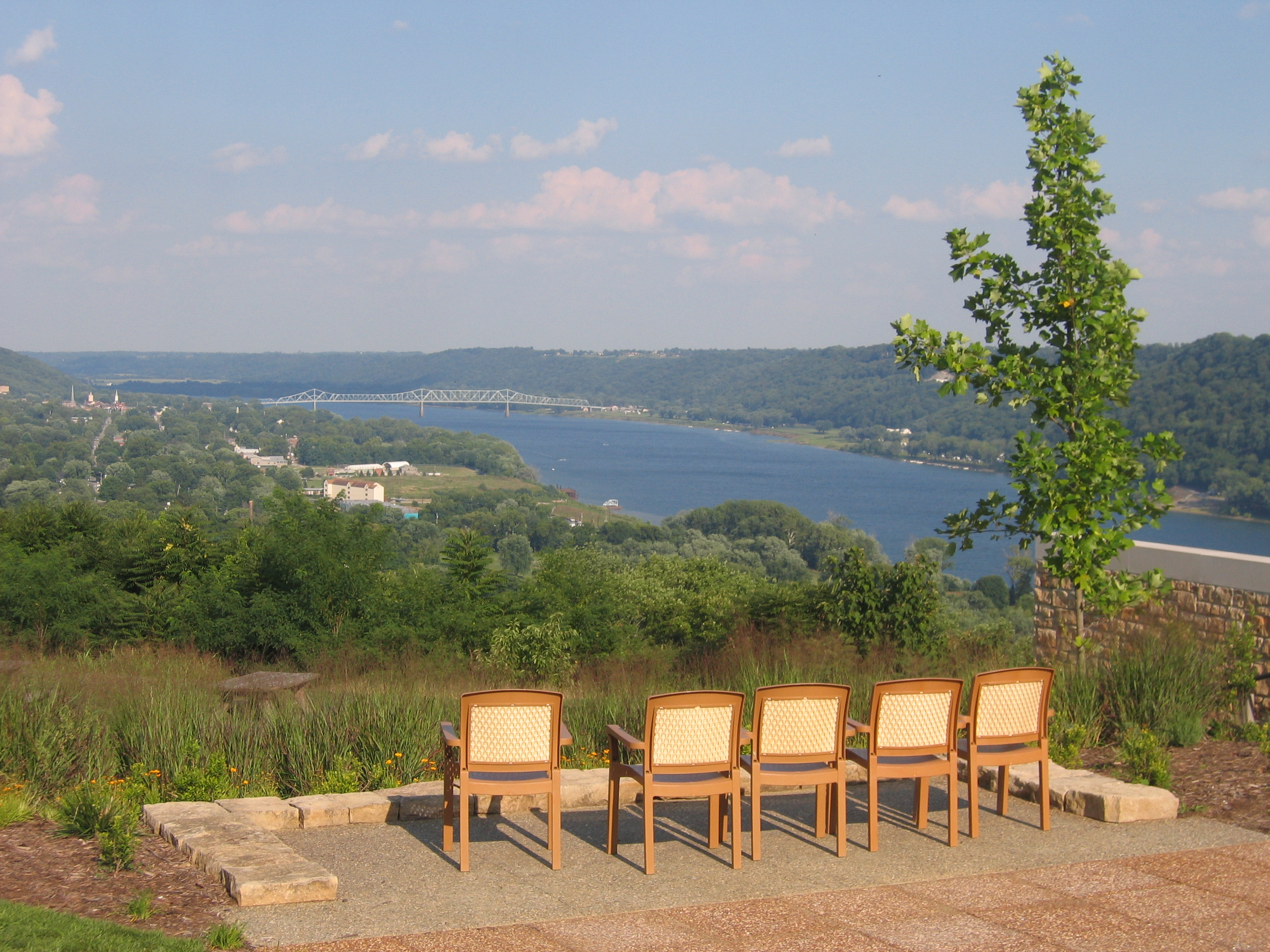
Original bridge viewed from Clifty Falls State Park in 2007

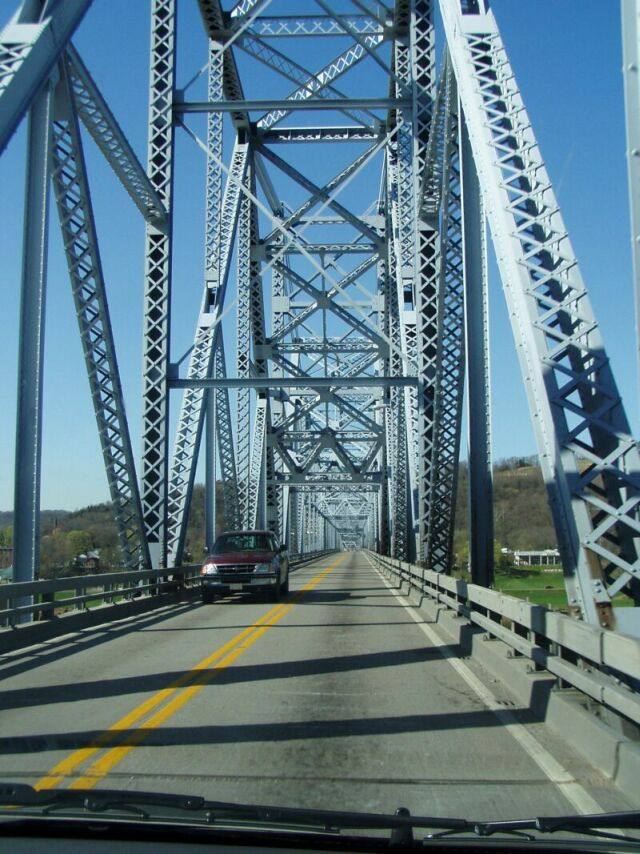
Deck of the original bridge in 2009

== See also ==
- List of bridges documented by the Historic American Engineering Record in Indiana
- List of bridges documented by the Historic American Engineering Record in Kentucky
- List of crossings of the Ohio River
