= Bedford, Kentucky =

- City
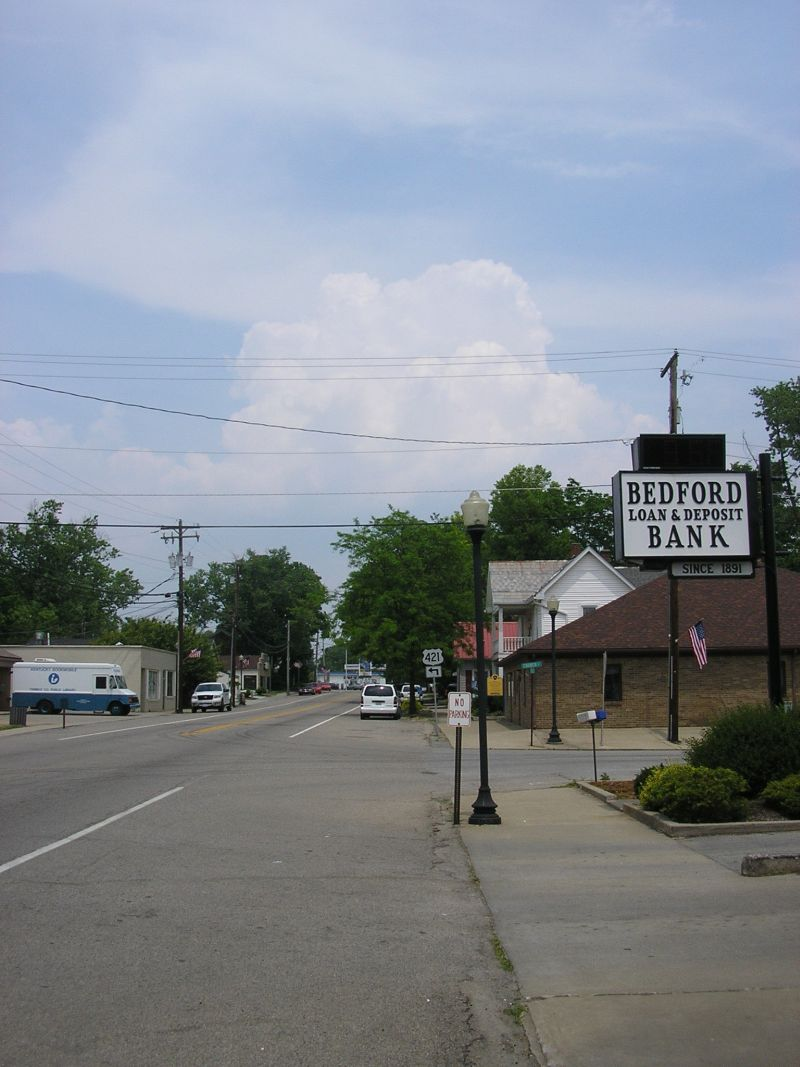
- Main Street in Bedford, Kentucky

- Location of Bedford in Trimble County, Kentucky.
- Coordinates: 38°35′31″N 85°19′2″W
- Country: United States
- State: Kentucky
- County: Trimble

Government
  - Mayor: Joe Robinson

Area
  - Total: 0.28 sq mi (0.72 km^{2})
  - Land: 0.27 sq mi (0.70 km^{2})
  - Water: 0.0039 sq mi (0.01 km^{2})
- Elevation: 902 ft (275 m)

Population (2020)
  - Total: 526
  - Density: 1,932.5/sq mi (746.15/km^{2})
- Time zone: UTC-5 (Eastern (EST))
  - Summer (DST): UTC-4 (EDT)
- ZIP code: 40006
- Area code: 502
- FIPS code: 21-04816
- GNIS feature ID: 0486653

Bedford is a home rule-class city in Trimble County, Kentucky, United States. The population was 574 at the 2020 Census. It is the second-largest city and county seat of Trimble County.

It is located at the junction of U.S. Routes 42 and 421.

== History ==
Bedford was founded in 1816 and first incorporated in 1850. Following its loss of city status, it was reincorporated in 1946. The Coleman House is listed on the National Register of Historic Places.

== Geography ==
According to the United States Census Bureau, the city has a total area of 0.4 square miles (1.0 km^{2}), all land.

== Demographics ==
Historical population
Census	Pop.	Note	%±
1850	285		—
1860	251		−11.9%
1870	200		−20.3%
1880	197		−1.5%
1890	250		26.9%
1900	307		22.8%
1910	269		−12.4%
1920	240		−10.8%
1930	286		19.2%
1940	387		35.3%
1950	533		37.7%
1960	717		34.5%
1970	780		8.8%
1980	835		7.1%
1990	761		−8.9%
2000	677		−11.0%
2010	599		−11.5%
2020	526		−12.2%
U.S. Decennial Census

At the 2000 census there were 677 people in 282 households, including 183 families, in the city. The population density was 1,690.3 inhabitants per square mile (652.6/km^{2}). There were 297 housing units at an average density of 741.5 per square mile (286.3/km^{2}). The racial makeup of the city was 97.93% White, 0.15% African American, 1.77% from other races, and 0.15% from two or more races. Hispanic or Latino of any race were 2.36%.

Of the 282 households 35.8% had children under the age of 18 living with them, 40.4% were married couples living together, 20.6% had a female householder with no husband present, and 35.1% were non-families. 28.7% of households were one person and 13.8% were one person aged 65 or older. The average household size was 2.40 and the average family size was 2.96.

The age distribution was 28.5% under the age of 18, 10.2% from 18 to 24, 30.9% from 25 to 44, 17.3% from 45 to 64, and 13.1% 65 or older. The median age was 32 years. For every 100 females, there were 89.6 males. For every 100 females age 18 and over, there were 74.1 males.

The median household income was $31,528 and the median family income was $36,250. Males had a median income of $30,341 versus $22,188 for females. The per capita income for the city was $14,818. About 12.9% of families and 15.5% of the population were below the poverty line, including 19.3% of those under age 18 and 7.1% of those age 65 or over.

== Education ==
Trimble County's sole high school, Trimble County High School, is located within Bedford. The city is also home to Bedford Elementary School.

Bedford has a public library, the Trimble County Public Library.

== Notable people ==
- Eva Anne Madden (1863–1958), American educator, journalist, playwright, author
