= Milton, Kentucky =

- City
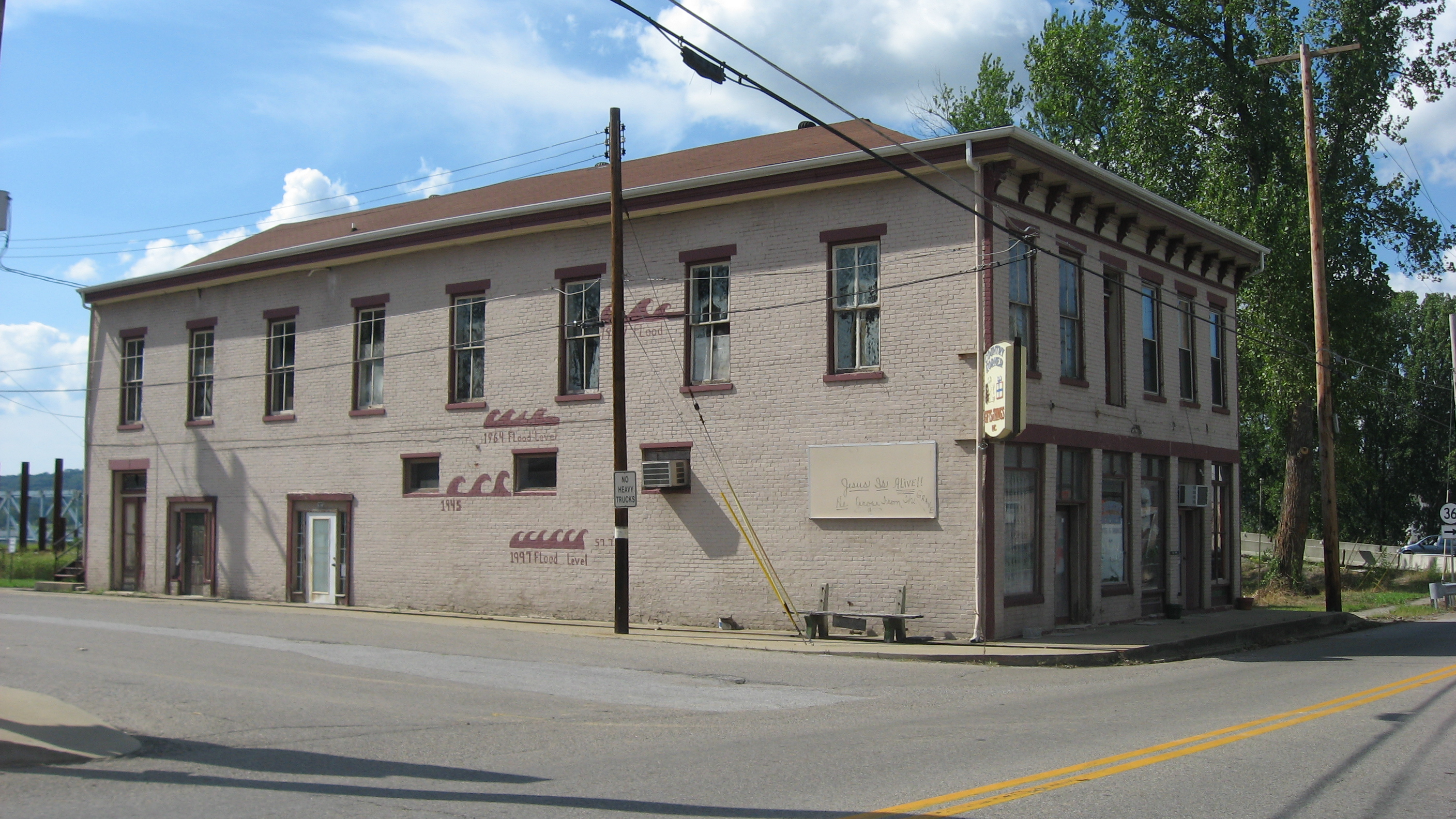
- Ginn's Furniture Store with high water marks on exterior wall

- Location of Milton in Trimble County, Kentucky.
- Coordinates: 38°42.6′N 85°22.5′W
- Country: United States
- State: Kentucky
- County: Trimble
- Incorporated: 1846
- Reincorporated: 1954

Government
  - Mayor: Denny Jackson

Area
  - Total: 1.48 sq mi (3.84 km^{2})
  - Land: 1.48 sq mi (3.83 km^{2})
  - Water: 0.0039 sq mi (0.01 km^{2})
- Elevation: 459 ft (140 m)

Population (2020)
  - Total: 590
  - Density: 399.2/sq mi (154.13/km^{2})
- Time zone: UTC-5 (Eastern (EST))
  - Summer (DST): UTC-4 (EDT)
- ZIP code: 40045
- Area code: 502
- FIPS code: 21-52590
- GNIS feature ID: 0498397
- Website: milton.ky.gov

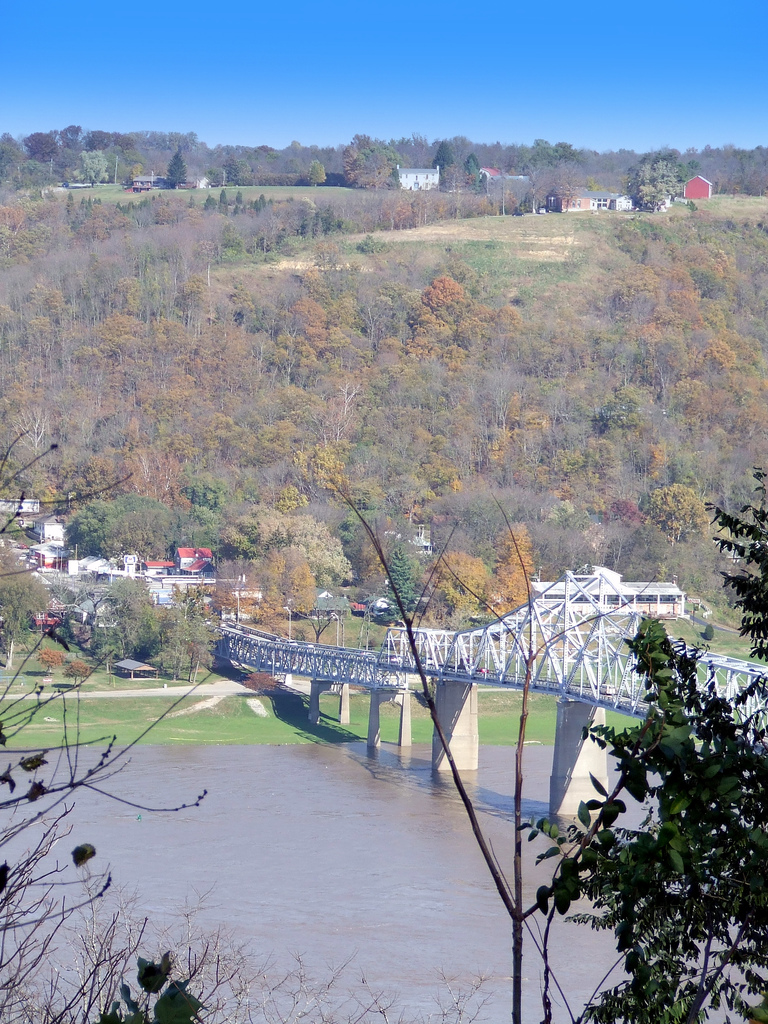
Madison, Indiana as seen from Milton, Kentucky

Milton is a home rule-class city along the south bank of the Ohio River in Trimble County, Kentucky, United States. The population was 597 at the time of the 2020 census, making it the largest city in Trimble County. The Milton-Madison Bridge connects it to Madison, Indiana, and is the only road link between the two states for 40 miles (64 km) in either direction.

It was part of the setting for the 1958 film Some Came Running starring Frank Sinatra, Dean Martin, and Shirley MacLaine.

== History ==
Milton was settled in 1785 and founded in 1789, at which time it was still part of Virginia. A ferry with Madison, Indiana, on the opposite side of the Ohio began service in 1804. A bridge connecting them was constructed in 1929.

One of Milton's earliest newspapers, the Milton Free Press, was established in 1879 by Lewis P. Sarlls.

The city has endured many floods and most of its riverside downtown has been repeatedly destroyed, leaving little historic architecture. Some exceptions are Ginn's Furniture Store, Rowlett's Grocery, and County General Store, all of which are located on Main Street.

Areas just south of Milton were hit by an intense EF3 tornado on March 2, 2012. The Milton Fire and Rescue firehouse #2 was destroyed.

Milton was hit by an EF2 tornado on March 14, 2024, causing considerable damage to downtown Milton and a countywide power outage that lasted 28 hours.

== Geography ==
Milton is located at 38°42.6′N 85°22.5′W (38.7095, -85.3742).

According to the United States Census Bureau, the city has a total area of 1.2 square miles (3.1 km^{2}), all land.

== Demographics ==
Historical population
Census	Pop.	Note	%±
1860	259		—
1870	223		−13.9%
1880	352		57.8%
1890	458		30.1%
1900	324		−29.3%
1910	355		9.6%
1960	365		—
1970	756		107.1%
1980	718		−5.0%
1990	563		−21.6%
2000	525		−6.7%
2010	574		9.3%
2020	590		2.8%
U.S. Decennial Census

As of the census of 2000, there were 525 people, 233 households, and 143 families residing in the city. The population density was 441.5 inhabitants per square mile (170.5/km^{2}). There were 266 housing units at an average density of 223.7 per square mile (86.4/km^{2}). The racial makeup of the city was 98.29% White, 0.19% Native American, 0.19% Asian, 0.57% from other races, and 0.76% from two or more races. Hispanic or Latino of any race were 0.95% of the population.

There were 233 households, out of which 26.6% had children under the age of 18 living with them, 50.2% were married couples living together, 6.9% had a female householder with no husband present, and 38.2% were non-families. 31.8% of all households were made up of individuals, and 18.0% had someone living alone who was 65 years of age or older. The average household size was 2.25 and the average family size was 2.84.

In the city, the population was spread out, with 19.4% under the age of 18, 10.7% from 18 to 24, 25.7% from 25 to 44, 25.0% from 45 to 64, and 19.2% who were 65 years of age or older. The median age was 41 years. For every 100 females, there were 81.0 males. For every 100 females age 18 and over, there were 83.9 males.

The median income for a household in the city was $23,250, and the median income for a family was $34,688. Males had a median income of $27,500 versus $14,875 for females. The per capita income for the city was $13,264. About 12.2% of families and 19.6% of the population were below the poverty line, including 19.3% of those under age 18 and 22.5% of those age 65 or over.

== Climate ==
The climate in this area is characterized by hot, humid summers and generally mild to cool winters. According to the Köppen Climate Classification system, Milton has a humid subtropical climate, abbreviated "Cfa" on climate maps.

== Notable person ==
- Sondra Rodgers, actress, was born in Milton

== See also ==
- List of cities and towns along the Ohio River
