= List of individual tornadoes by year =

This is a list of tornadoes that are considered notable independently of their wider tornado outbreak.

== Pre-1800s ==
- 1091 London tornado
- 1551/1556 Grand Harbour of Malta tornado
- 1680 Lexington tornado
- 1764 Woldegk tornado

== 1800s ==
- 1835 Middlesex County tornado
- 1840 Natchez tornado
- 1845 Montville tornado
- 1846 Grenada tornado
- 1855 Des Plaines tornado
- 1856 Philadelphia tornado
- 1865 Viroqua tornado
- 1871 St. Louis tornado
- 1878 Wallingford tornado
- 1879 Bouctouche tornado
- 1880 Marshfield tornado
- 1882 Grinnell tornado
- 1883 Rochester tornado
- 1884 Garnett tornado
- 1884 Howard tornado
- 1890 Wilkes-Barre tornado
- 1893 Pomeroy tornado
- 1896 Sherman tornado
- 1896 St. Louis–East St. Louis tornado
- 1898 Fort Smith tornadoes
- 1899 New Richmond tornado

== 1900s ==
- 1902 Goliad tornado
- 1903 Gainesville tornado
- 1904 Moscow tornado
- 1904 Chappaqua tornado
- 1905 Snyder tornado
- 1912 Regina tornado
- 1918 Brighton tornado
- 1918 Tyler tornado
- 1919 Fergus Falls tornado
- 1922 Austin twin tornadoes
- 1924 Sandusky–Lorain tornado
- 1924 Thurman tornado
- 1925 Tri-State tornado
- 1925 Miami tornado
- 1926 Encarnación tornado
- 1927 Rocksprings tornado
- 1928 Rockford tornado
- 1929 Sneed tornado
- 1930 Montello tornado
- 1931 Birmingham tornado
- 1931 Lublin tornado
- 1938 Rodessa tornado
- 1943 Hackleburg tornado
- 1944 Shinnston tornado
- 1946 Windsor–Tecumseh tornado
- 1947 Higgins–Woodward tornado
- 1948 Tinker Air Force Base tornadoes
- 1951 Corn tornado
- 1953 Waco tornado
- 1953 Sarnia tornado
- 1953 Flint–Beecher tornado
- 1953 Worcester tornado
- 1953 Vicksburg tornado
- 1954 London tornado
- 1955 Udall tornado
- 1955 Scottsbluff tornado
- 1956 Saugatuck–Holland tornado
- 1956 McDonald Chapel tornado
- 1957 Ruskin Heights tornado
- 1957 Fargo tornado
- 1964 Harpersville tornado
- 1964 Wichita Falls tornado
- 1964 Central Nebraska tornado
- 1964 Chesterfield Township tornado
- 1964 Larose tornado
- 1966 Jackson tornado
- 1967 Belvidere tornado
- 1967 Oak Lawn tornado
- 1968 Charles City tornado
- 1968 Oelwein–Maynard tornado
- 1968 Tracy tornado
- 1968 Black Forest tornado
- 1970 Bulahdelah tornado
- 1970 Lubbock tornado
- 1970 Sudbury tornado
- 1971 Inverness tornado
- 1971 Gosser Ridge tornado
- 1971 Joplin tornado
- 1973 San Justo tornado
- 1973 Faridpur District tornado
- 1973 Jonesboro tornado
- 1973 Union City tornado
- 1973 Central Alabama tornado
- 1973 Brisbane tornado
- 1974 Brandenburg tornado
- 1974 Xenia tornado
- 1974 Cincinnati tornado
- 1974 Tanner tornadoes
- 1974 Guin tornado
- 1975 Canton tornado
- 1976 Brownwood tornado
- 1978 Pomona Lake tornado
- 1979 Wichita Falls tornado
- 1979 Woodstock tornadoes
- 1979 Windsor Locks tornado
- 1980 Kalamazoo tornado
- 1981 West Bend tornado
- 1982 Marion tornado
- 1983 South Central Los Angeles tornado
- 1984 Montgomery tornado
- 1985 Niles–Wheatland tornado
- 1985 Barrie tornado
- 1987 Saragosa tornado
- 1987 Teton–Yellowstone tornado
- 1987 Edmonton tornado
- 1989 Daulatpur–Saturia tornado
- 1989 Coldenham tornado
- 1989 Huntsville tornado
- 1990 Bakersfield Valley tornado
- 1990 Manukan tornado
- 1990 Plainfield tornado
- 1991 Andover tornado
- 1991 Itu tornado
- 1991 Springfield tornado
- 1992 Chandler–Lake Wilson tornado
- 1992 Bucca tornado
- 1995 Joppa–Arab tornado
- 1995 Anderson Hills tornado
- 1995 Great Barrington tornado
- 1995 Pampa tornado
- 1996 Melbourne tornado family
- 1996 Southern Ontario tornadoes
- 1996 Bangladesh tornado
- 1996 Oakfield tornado
- 1997 Miami tornado
- 1997 Jarrell tornado
- 1998 Oak Grove–Birmingham tornado
- 1998 Spencer tornado
- 1999 Shreveport–Bossier City tornado
- 1999 Bridge Creek–Moore tornado
- 1999 Haysville–Wichita tornado
- 1999 Dover–Hennessey tornado
- 1999 Mulhall tornado
- 1999 Loyal Valley tornado
- 1999 Salt Lake City tornado
- 1999 Manenberg tornado

== 2000s ==
- 2000 Pine Lake tornado
- 2000 Xenia tornado
- 2001 Hoisington tornado
- 2002 La Plata tornado
- 2002 Van Wert–Roselms tornado
- 2003 Bendigo tornado
- 2003 Manchester tornado
- 2004 Hallam tornado
- 2004 Roanoke tornado
- 2005 Indaiatuba tornado
- 2005 Birmingham tornado
- 2005 Evansville tornado
- 2006 London tornado
- 2007 Enterprise tornado
- 2007 Greensburg tornado
- 2007 Elie tornado
- 2007 Brooklyn tornado
- 2008 Atkins–Clinton tornado
- 2008 Union University tornado
- 2008 Prattville–Millbrook tornado
- 2008 Atlanta tornado
- 2008 Picher–Neosho tornado
- 2008 Parkersburg–New Hartford tornado
- 2009 Lone Grove tornado
- 2009 Krasnozavodsk tornado
- 2009 Goshen County tornado
- 2010 Yazoo City tornado
- 2010 Millbury tornado
- 2010 Wadena tornado
- 2010 Conger–Albert Lea tornado
- 2010 Billings tornado
- 2010 Bronx tornado
- 2011 Iowa tornadoes
- 2011 Sanford–Raleigh tornado
- 2011 St. Louis tornado
- 2011 Philadelphia tornado
- 2011 Cullman–Arab tornado
- 2011 Hackleburg–Phil Campbell tornado
- 2011 Cordova–Blountsville tornado
- 2011 Smithville tornado
- 2011 Flat Rock–Trenton tornado
- 2011 Tuscaloosa–Birmingham tornado
- 2011 Sawyerville–Eoline tornado
- 2011 Enterprise tornado
- 2011 Rainsville tornado
- 2011 Shoal Creek Valley–Ohatchee tornado
- 2011 Ringgold–Apison tornado
- 2011 Reading tornado
- 2011 Joplin tornado
- 2011 El Reno–Piedmont tornado
- 2011 Chickasha–Blanchard tornado
- 2011 Washington–Goldsby tornado
- 2011 Springfield tornado
- 2011 Goderich tornado
- 2012 Center Point–Clay tornado
- 2012 Branson tornado
- 2012 Henryville tornado
- 2012 Crittenden–Piner tornado
- 2012 West Liberty tornado
- 2012 East Bernstadt tornado
- 2012 Dexter tornado
- 2012 Woodward tornado
- 2013 Hattiesburg tornado
- 2013 Brahmanbaria tornado
- 2013 Shuqualak tornado
- 2013 Granbury tornado
- 2013 Moore tornado
- 2013 El Reno tornado
- 2013 Wayne tornado
- 2013 Washington tornado
- 2014 Mayflower–Vilonia tornado
- 2014 Louisville tornado
- 2014 Pilger tornado family
- 2015 Rochelle–Fairdale tornado
- 2015 Pakistan tornado
- 2015 Holly Springs–Ashland tornado
- 2015 Garland–Rowlett tornado
- 2016 Abilene–Chapman tornado
- 2016 Funing tornado
- 2016 Manzanita tornado
- 2017 Albany tornado
- 2017 Perryville tornado
- 2018 Carr Fire tornado
- 2019 Havana tornado
- 2019 Columbus tornado
- 2019 Beauregard tornado
- 2019 Bara–Parsa tornado
- 2019 Ruston tornado
- 2019 Dayton tornado
- 2019 Linwood tornado
- 2019 North Dallas tornado
- 2020 Nashville tornado
- 2020 Cookeville tornado
- 2020 Jonesboro tornado
- 2020 Monroe tornado
- 2020 Bassfield–Soso tornado
- 2020 Hampton County tornado
- 2020 Ashby–Dalton tornado
- 2021 Fultondale tornado
- 2021 Naperville–Woodridge tornado
- 2021 South Moravia tornado
- 2021 Boscobel tornado
- 2021 Monette–Samburg tornado
- 2021 Western Kentucky tornado
- 2021 Bowling Green tornadoes
- 2022 Winterset tornado
- 2022 Pembroke–Black Creek tornado
- 2022 Andover tornado
- 2022 Gaylord tornado
- 2023 Selma tornado
- 2023 Old Kingston–Lake Martin tornado
- 2023 Pasadena–Deer Park tornado
- 2023 Rolling Fork tornado
- 2023 Black Hawk–Winona tornado
- 2023 Amory tornado
- 2023 Little Rock tornado
- 2023 Wynne–Parkin tornado
- 2023 Robinson–Sullivan tornado
- 2023 Bethel Springs–Adamsville tornado
- 2023 Aung Myin Kone–Tada U tornado
- 2023 Virginia Beach tornado
- 2023 Perryton tornado
- 2023 Jersey tornado
- 2023 Clarksville tornado
- 2023 Hendersonville tornado
- 2024 Lakeview–Russells Point tornado
- 2024 Elkhorn tornado
- 2024 Minden–Harlan tornado
- 2024 Sulphur tornado
- 2024 Westmoreland tornado
- 2024 Barnsdall tornado
- 2024 Tallahassee tornadoes
- 2024 Greenfield tornado
- 2024 Valley View tornado
- 2025 Fifty-Six–Larkin tornado
- 2025 Cushman–Cave City tornado
- 2025 Kentwood–Carson tornado
- 2025 St. Louis tornado
- 2025 Somerset–London tornado
- 2025 South Kansas tornado family
- 2025 Enderlin tornado
- 2025 La Sal fire tornado
- 2025 Magang tornado
- 2025 Rio Bonito do Iguaçu tornado
- 2026 Union City tornado

== See also ==
- Lists of tornadoes and tornado outbreaks
