= 1991 Itu tornado =

F4 tornado in São Paulo, Brazil

- Aftermath of a passenger bus

Meteorological history
- Date: 30 September 1991
- Formed: ~6:30 pm (UTC–3)

F4 tornado
- on the Fujita scale
- Max width: 400 m (440 yd)
- Path length: 30 km (19 mi)
- Highest winds: 333–418 km/h (207–260 mph)

Overall effects
- Fatalities: 15 (some cite 16)
- Injuries: >200 (some cite 350)
- Areas affected: Itu, Cabreúva, São Paulo, Brazil
- Part of the Tornadoes of 1991

During the evening of September 30, 1991, a violent tornado struck the municipalities of Itu and Cabreúva in São Paulo, Brazil, killing fifteen people and injuring over 200 others, causing devastating widespread damage to buildings, vehicles and even the vegetation. Considered as the strongest tornado ever documented in Brazil's history.

The tornado's intensity has been described differently by different sources. Local retrospective reports identify it as F3 on the original Fujita scale, while other publications and meteorological assessments consider F4 intensity possible or probable. There is no demonstrated basis in the sources cited here for treating an F5 classification as established.

== Meteorological event ==
The tornado struck in early evening, at approximately 6:30 pm local time, although sources vary between 6:20 pm and 6:40 pm. Witness accounts described violent winds and extensive destruction over a narrow corridor. Reports disagree on its precise dimensions: the local news outlet Jornal Periscópio and a 1999 newspaper report describe a damage swathe approximately 30 km (19 mi) long and up to 400 m (440 yd) wide, whereas another local account describes severe damage over about 20 km (12 mi) and a width of 100 to 200 m (110 to 220 yd).

The affected corridor was reported to extend from the vicinity of the Rodovia do Açúcar (SP-308) towards the Serra do Japi. Severe thunderstorms also affected neighbouring communities, but reports of wind damage or electricity outages in those areas do not by themselves establish that the same tornado remained continuously on the ground through each municipality.

== Damage and casualties ==
The tornado destroyed homes, damaged industrial buildings and brought down trees, electricity poles and transmission towers. A report published in 1999 stated that five industrial facilities and 280 homes were destroyed. About 450,000 people across Itu, Cabreúva, Salto and Indaiatuba experienced electricity disruption, according to the same account.

One of the deadliest incidents involved a bus carrying students, which was lifted or overturned by the wind. Contemporary reporting described it as a 22-tonne vehicle displaced approximately 30 m (33 yd), and recorded eight deaths among the passengers. Later retrospective accounts reported ten deaths in the bus incident and different displacement distances. The conflicting accounts should not be combined into a single precise figure without additional verification.

Other reports described vehicles carried considerable distances by the wind, major damage to buildings and the collapse of a large obelisk. Writing about Brazilian tornadoes, the scientific magazine Ciência Hoje reported that a 100-tonne obelisk was knocked over and cars were moved as far as 700 m (770 yd). These accounts illustrate the event's severity but do not constitute direct instrument measurements of the tornado's maximum wind speed.

== Intensity assessment ==
Several retrospective local accounts give the tornado an F3 classification, and the newspaper Jornal Periscópio has described winds of around 300 km/h (190 mph). In contrast, a 2008 Itu news article referred to the event as F4, while a 2013 analysis by MetSul Meteorologia stated that it was believed to have reached F4 intensity.

The Fujita scale is a damage-based classification system: wind-speed ranges associated with a category are estimates, not evidence of winds having been measured at those speeds during this particular event. For that reason, the F4 reference range sometimes quoted for the Itu tornado should not be presented as a directly observed peak wind speed. The available cited sources also do not establish a formal F5 reassessment.

== Aftermath and research ==
The storm caused widespread disruptions to electricity and water supplies and left numerous residents in need of assistance. The local authorities sought emergency support for reconstruction. By 1999, a report in Folha de Londrina stated that homes destroyed in the disaster had been rebuilt within three years. On the eighth anniversary, a memorial service was held for the victims in Itu.

The tornado became an important case in the study of severe weather in Brazil. Unicamp researchers have described the 1991 event as among the country's most violent documented tornadoes and have connected it with increased research attention to tornado risk in the region.

== See also ==
- Tornadoes of 1991
- List of Brazil tornadoes
- 1973 San Justo tornado
