= 1996 Melbourne tornado family =

Family of F4 tornadoes in Northern Arkansas

- Counter-clockwise from the top: The tornado as it entered Izard County, Arkansas; High-end F4 damage to a home near Allison, Arkansas; Path of the tornadoes across northern Arkansas

Meteorological history
- Formed: April 14, 1996, 7:10 p.m. CDT (UTC−05:00)
- Dissipated: April 14, 1996, 8:22 p.m. CDT (UTC−05:00)
- Duration: 1 hour and 21 minutes

F4 tornado
- on the Fujita scale
- Max width: 880 yards (0.50 mi; 0.80 km)
- Path length: 44 miles (71 km)
- Highest winds: 207–260 mph (333–418 km/h)

Overall effects
- Fatalities: 7
- Injuries: 35
- Damage: $7.5 million (1996 USD)
- Areas affected: Stone County, Arkansas, Izard County, Arkansas, especially Melbourne, Arkansas
- Part of the Tornadoes of 1996

In the later evening hours of April 14, 1996, two violent and long-tracked F4 tornadoes struck northern Arkansas, including the eastern portion of Melbourne, Arkansas, causing over $7.5 million (1996 USD) in damages, resulting in 7 fatalities and 35 injuries. The tornadoes altogether tracked 44 miles (71 km) through Stone and Izard Counties, and had a peak width of 880 yards (0.50 mi; 0.80 km).

The tornado touched down at 7:10 p.m. (Note: For consistency, all times are in Central Daylight Time.) near Fox, Arkansas tracking northeast. The tornado began intensifying immediately after formation, inflicting F4 damage to a campground near South Sylamore Creek, where 4 fatalities occurred. Nearby, a home was swept away at peak intensity, where an additional fatality occurred. The tornado continued northeastward, roping out as a new area of rotation began forming beside the weakening tornado. As it dissipated, a new tornado touched down, succeeding its track. The new tornado immediately intensified to peak intensity where it crossed White River into Sylamore, Arkansas beside Allison, Arkansas, producing significant damage to a home, where the final two fatalities occurred. The tornado continued northeast before striking the town of Melbourne, Arkansas, causing extensive damage to the eastern portions. The tornado then dissipated shortly afterwards at 8:22 p.m. All together, the tornadoes were on the ground for 1 hour and 21 minutes, killed 7 and injured 30.

== Meteorological synopsis ==
12Z Convective Forecast map of the US

On April 14, A northern short-wave trough stretched over the West South Central states, along with a strong aloft low-pressure system located in the Great Plains, drawing and pushing dry air from the west easternly towards Arkansas as it moved towards the Ohio Valley. As the dry air that pushed east collided with the warmer moist air from the Gulf of Mexico, thunderstorms began firing near portions of the Southern United States. The Storm Prediction Center then issued a convective outlook, showing a moderate risk in the area. As southern thunderstorms began intensifying, they began producing the storm system's first tornadoes, preceding the Melbourne tornadoes. At 12:40 p.m. a short-lived F0 tornado touched down in St. Tammany Parish, Louisiana. An hour later, at 1:45 p.m. another short-lived F0 tornado touched down in Harrison County, Mississippi.

At 2:30 p.m. National Weather Service Little Rock (NWS Little Rock) issued a Severe weather statement and a Tornado watch that spanned across the entire state, noting storms could fire in western Arkansas. At 4:48 p.m. an F1 tornado touched down in Pickens County, Alabama, the final tornado that would touchdown before the Melbourne tornadoes.

At 6:27 p.m. NWS Little Rock issued an Updated Zone Forecast (Note: An Updated Zone Forecast is a public forecast for a specific area, usually a county or an area within a county.) for Stone and Izard Counties, noting that a Tornado watch was in effect until 1:00 a.m. and there was a 60% chance for severe thunderstorms to fire near the counties. Supercells would fire nearby soon afterwards, with one thunderstorm having strong mesocyclone near Stone County.

== Tornado summary ==
=== First tornado and Stone County ===
As the severe thunderstorm west of the Stone County line began to show signs of rapid mesocyclone intensification, Meteorologists from National Weather Service Little Rock (NWS Little Rock) issued a tornado warning at 7:00 p.m. for the majority of Stone County, noting that a possible tornado was tracking towards the towns of Fox and Timbo, Arkansas at 35 miles per hour (56 km/h).

F4 damage to a home along South Sylamore Creek

A tornado then touched down at 7:10 p.m. just northwest of Fox, where a funnel cloud was reported by Weather spotters in Timbo shortly afterwards. The tornado tracked northeastward over open land towards the White River, immediately intensifying as it passed the Skyland Baptist Church at F3 intensity, where an uprooted tree fell on the roof, causing minor exterior damage. As the tornado continued northeastward, it began inflicting extensive F4 damage towards the Holiday Mountain Resort campgrounds along South Sylamore Creek at 7:12 p.m. where 4 people were killed as recreational vehicles were overturned and tossed into the creek, and parked vehicles were crushed by trees. An additional fatality also occurred when a home was completely reduced to its concrete foundation 3.5 miles (5.6 km) southwest of Allison, Arkansas, causing a total of $2.5 million (1996 USD) in damages.

At 7:25 p.m. the tornado was reportedly observed by weather spotters, which was forwarded to NWS Little Rock, issuing a severe weather statement updating the projected path of the tornado. The tornado began to weaken, roping out as the thunderstorm recycled and produced a second tornadic circulation. The tornado then dissipated as a second touched down at 7:39 p.m. 3 miles (4.8 km) southwest of Allison, strengthening immediately after formation to F4 intensity as it tracked northeastward, succeeding the original tornado.

=== Second tornado and Sylamore–Izard County ===
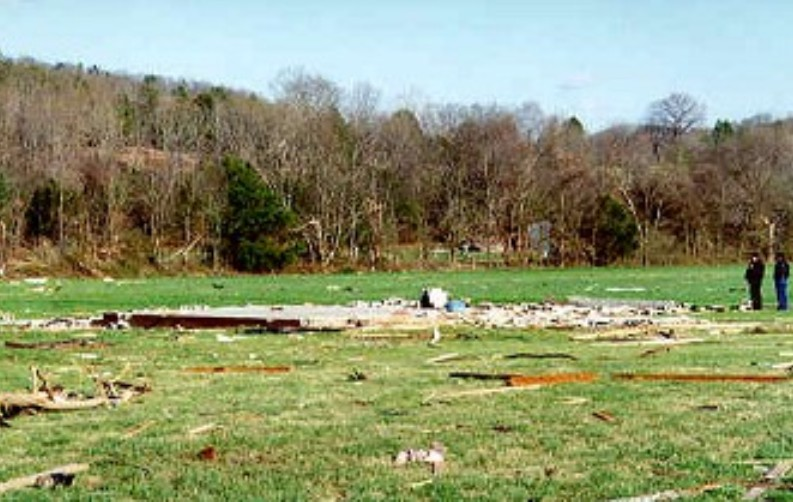
Significant F4 damage to a home near Sylamore

The tornado on Weather radar shortly before hitting Sylamore

As the second tornado continued at peak intensity, a new tornado warning was issued for the majority of Izard County, noting that Melbourne, Arkansas was at risk of being hit. The tornado continued northeast, then striking the community of Sylamore, Arkansas at 7:40 p.m. just outside of Allison as it crossed the White River. Extensive damage occurred in Sylamore, including a permanent home that was completely swept off its foundation, killing its two residents, which were the parents of Kurt Warner's wife. Shortly afterwards, local law enforcement and paramedics arrived at the scene as the tornado crossed the river.

At 7:55 p.m. another severe weather statement was issued for Izard County, clarifying the severity of the storm, also mentioning the injury reports that near Sylamore. It stated, "THIS CONTINUES TO BE A VERY DANGEROUS STORM. PEOPLE IN ITS PATH NEED TO TAKE COVER NOW." The tornado then continued along State Highway 9 on track towards Melbourne, moving consistently at 35 miles per hour (56 km/h).

=== Melbourne and dissipation ===
As the tornado tracked into the eastern portions of Melbourne at 8:00 p.m. It inflicted heavy damage towards local businesses and homes, and caused a large power outage, leaving over 2,100 people without power in the surrounding areas. A Ford car dealership was struck directly by the tornado, causing extensive damage to new vehicles. An auditorium was also struck and inflicted heavy damage. Over 8 people were hospitalized in Melbourne as the tornado passed through subdivisions and neighborhoods in the Melbourne area, inflicting over $5 million (1996 USD) in damages to Melbourne. The tornado continued northeast of Melbourne as it began to weaken significantly in intensity, despite NWS Little Rock continuing the tornado warning to expire at 9:00 p.m. The tornado then roped out and dissipated at 8:22 p.m. just southeast of Horseshoe Bend, Arkansas after being on the ground for 28 miles (45 km).

Overall, both tornadoes tracked 44 miles (71 km) across Stone and Izard Counties, injured 30 and caused over 7 fatalities, and caused $7.5 million (1996 USD) in damages.

== Aftermath ==
As the storm passed, debris clean-up began the next day. Members of the Skyland Baptist Church removed fallen trees from rooftops and surrounding areas. 8 victims in Melbourne were hospitalized at the Stone County Hospital, including two that were originally reported as missing. Arkansas Power and Light reported over 2,100–3,000 residents were without power after the tornado passed through eastern Melbourne, though early in the morning hours of April 15, power was restored to the majority of Melbourne. On the same day, Governor Jim Guy Tucker signed a disaster declaration for Stone and Izard Counties, qualifying the impacted areas for financial aid.

In response to the tornadoes, a spokesman from the Arkansas Office of Emergency Preparedness stated that "This is probably the worst storm of the '90s for Arkansas". During their lifetimes, both tornadoes altogether demolished over 20 houses, businesses, and other local structures within Stone and Izard Counties along the 44 miles (71 km) they tracked. The tornadoes also left a scar in the southern Ozarks as they levelled many of the trees in the area.

== See Also ==
- 1996 Oakfield tornado - A violent F5 tornado that happened just months later
- Tornadoes of 1996
