= 1929 Sneed tornado =

1929 tornado in Arkansas, U.S.

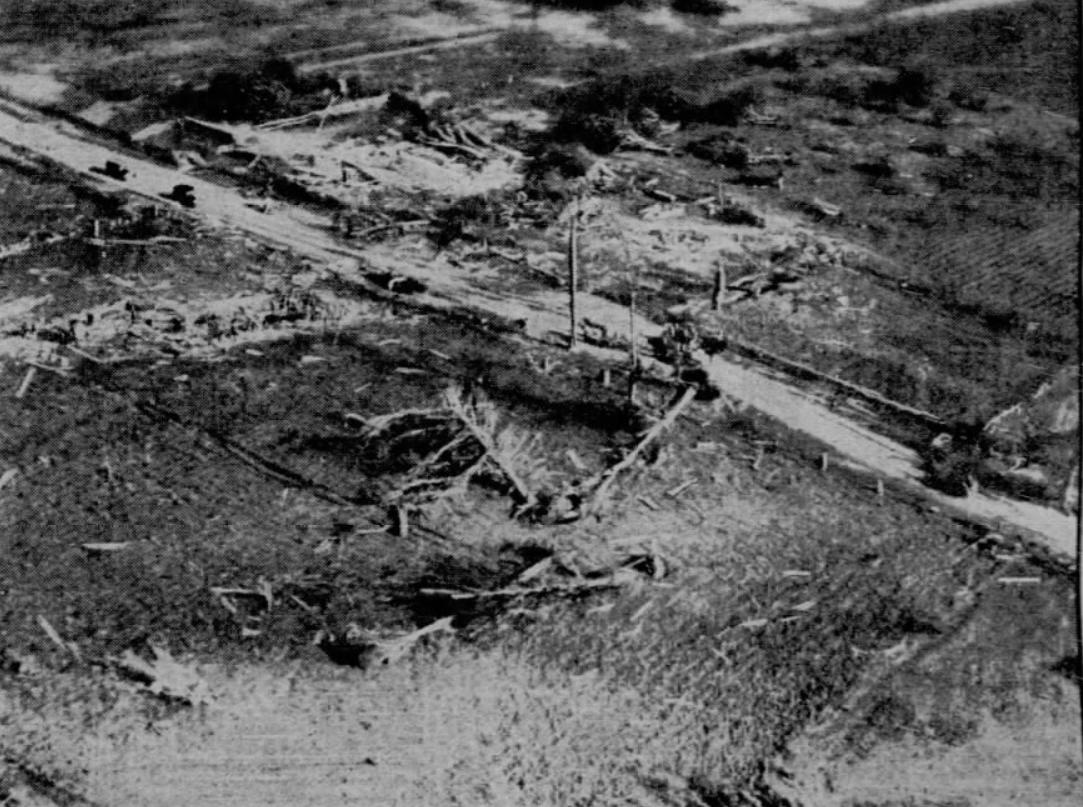
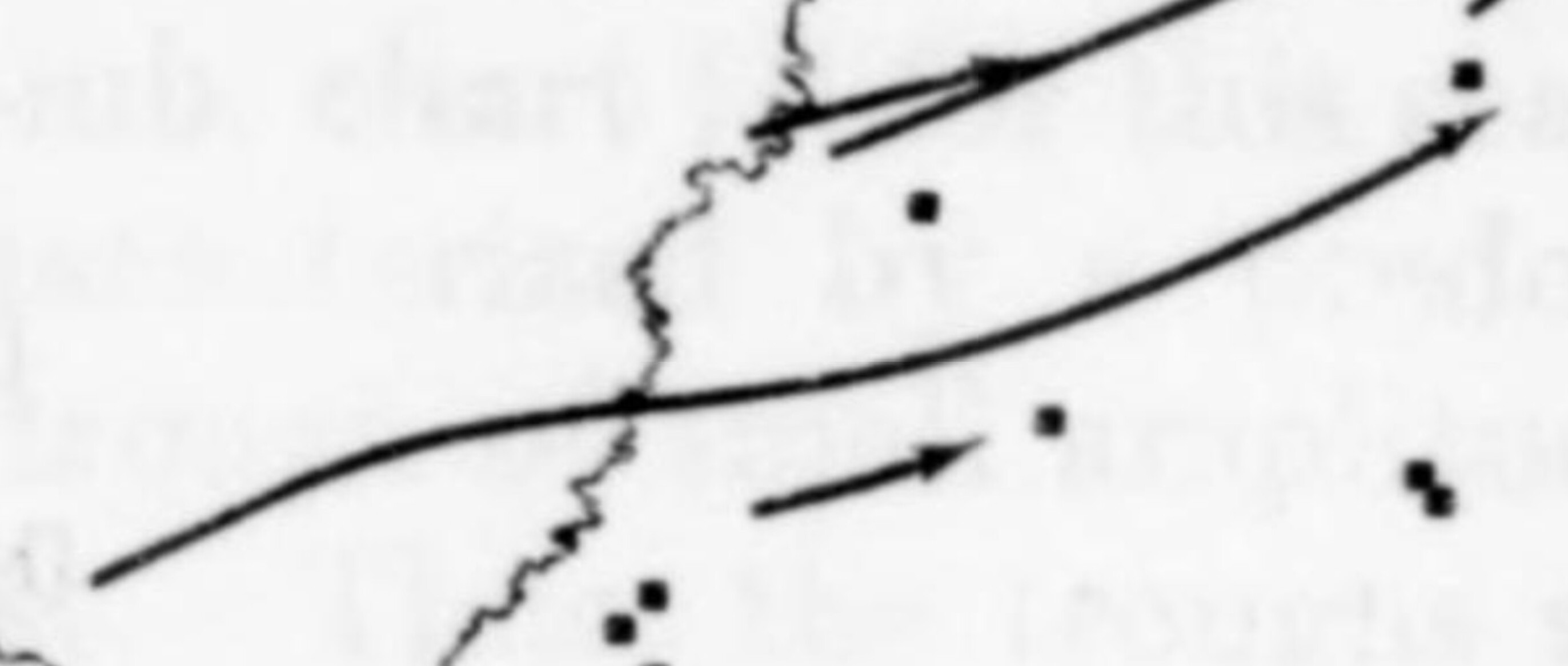
- Top: Damage from the tornado in Sneed, Arkansas Bottom: A map showing the approximate path of the tornado

Meteorological history
- Formed: April 10, 1929, c. 6:00 p.m. CST (UTC-06:00)
- Dissipated: Unknown
- Duration: Unknown

F5 equiv. tornado
- Max width: 500 yd (460 m)
- Path length: 34.8 mi (56.0 km)
- Highest winds: >260 mph (420 km/h)

Overall effects
- Fatalities: 23
- Injuries: 80
- Damage: $170,000 (1927 USD) $3.22 million (2026 USD)

On April 10, 1929, a large and extremely destructive multiple-vortex tornado impacted several communities in north-central portions of the U.S. state of Arkansas. The tornado, commonly known as the Sneed Tornado after the community of Sneed which it destroyed, killed 23 people and injured 80 others. It was the only F5-rated tornado to ever hit Arkansas and heavily damaged the communities of Swifton, Guion, Sneed and areas near Alicia.

== Tornado summary ==
The tornado first touched down 3 miles (4.8 km) south of Batesville, tracking to the east and northeast. Three people and a further 60 were injured as the tornado tracked through portions of Independence County. The funnel "hovered" over the Black Mountain area near Batesville; it retained a multiple-vortex structure before impacting the town of Guion. The town was completely destroyed, with only a few buildings remaining standing. In Moorefield, the tornado heavily damaged more homes and injured several residents.

In Jackson County, the tornado was reported in the Diaz area, where three people suffered injuries. At around 6:00 p.m. CST, the tornado entered into the town of Swifton; a funnel cloud was visible as the tornado impacted town. According to an April 1929 publication of The Daily World, the tornado had an audible roar and was "sweeping everything be-heed it's warning" as it was in Swifton. Several people were picked up and tossed by the tornado; others were killed as their homes collapsed on top of them. A home in Swifton was set aloft by the tornado and dropped in a creek; three of the occupants were killed.

The tornado then exhibited a phenomenon known as "skipping", where it produced an inconsistent damage path for an estimated 2 miles (3.2 km).

The tornado produced its most extreme damage as it neared Sneed, where it "crumbled" 35 homes on the Possum Trot Highway. Most families that owned residences on the highway lost at least one family member as a direct result of the tornado. It then impacted the Mount Pleasant area, before dissipating after crossing railroad tracks near Alicia.

== Aftermath ==
Damage in Guion following the tornado

The International Red Cross and Red Crescent Movement in St. Louis, Missouri traveled to Newport, Arkansas to aid in relief efforts. Immediately following the tornado, residents of Guion wrote to the Arkansas Gazette asking for food and tents to be transported to the town. The tornado was the only F5 tornado on the Fujita scale ever recorded in the state of Arkansas.

At least 10 homes that had originally stood in Guion were later rebuilt on a new site.

=== Fatalities ===
Bodies of the people killed in Guion were brought to Batesville via a freight train that was operated by the Missouri Pacific Railroad. In addition to fatalities, the train also transported the injured to hospitals in the area. On April 19, two more bodies of tornado victims were found in residences near the White River in Guion.

List of victims of the tornado (Note: While 24 victims are listed, the National Weather Service retains a final and official death toll of 23.)
Name	Age	
Ruth Riley	4	Swifton, Arkansas
Buster Riley	6	Swifton, Arkansas
Esther Riley	45	Swifton, Arkansas
Russell Long	45	Swifton, Arkansas
Vinnie Long	17	Swifton, Arkansas
Howard Watts	12	Swifton, Arkansas
Thurlo Hudgens	32	Swifton, Arkansas
Charles Defries	45	Swifton, Arkansas
Grace Defries	4	Swifton, Arkansas
Cleo Nicholson	~30	Swifton, Arkansas
John Loy	45	Swifton, Arkansas
A.J. Rolett	52	Swifton, Arkansas
Unidentified	N/A	Swifton, Arkansas
Thelma Pierce	30	Guion, Arkansas
Thana Tilton	N/A	Guion, Arkansas
Claude Campbell	N/A	Guion, Arkansas
Unidentified female	N/A	Guion, Arkansas
Unidentified child	N/A	Guion, Arkansas
Henry Lowthan	N/A	Lorado, Arkansas
"Miss" Lowthan	N/A	Lorado, Arkansas
Lowthan child	N/A	Lorado, Arkansas
Lowthan child	N/A	Lorado, Arkansas
Lowthan child	N/A	Lorado, Arkansas
Tom Adams	N/A	Lorado, Arkansas

== See also ==
- List of F5, EF5, and IF5 tornadoes
  - 2020 Jonesboro tornado, another strong tornado in Arkansas
