= 2024 Lakeview–Russells Point tornado =

2024 EF3 tornado in Ohio, U.S.

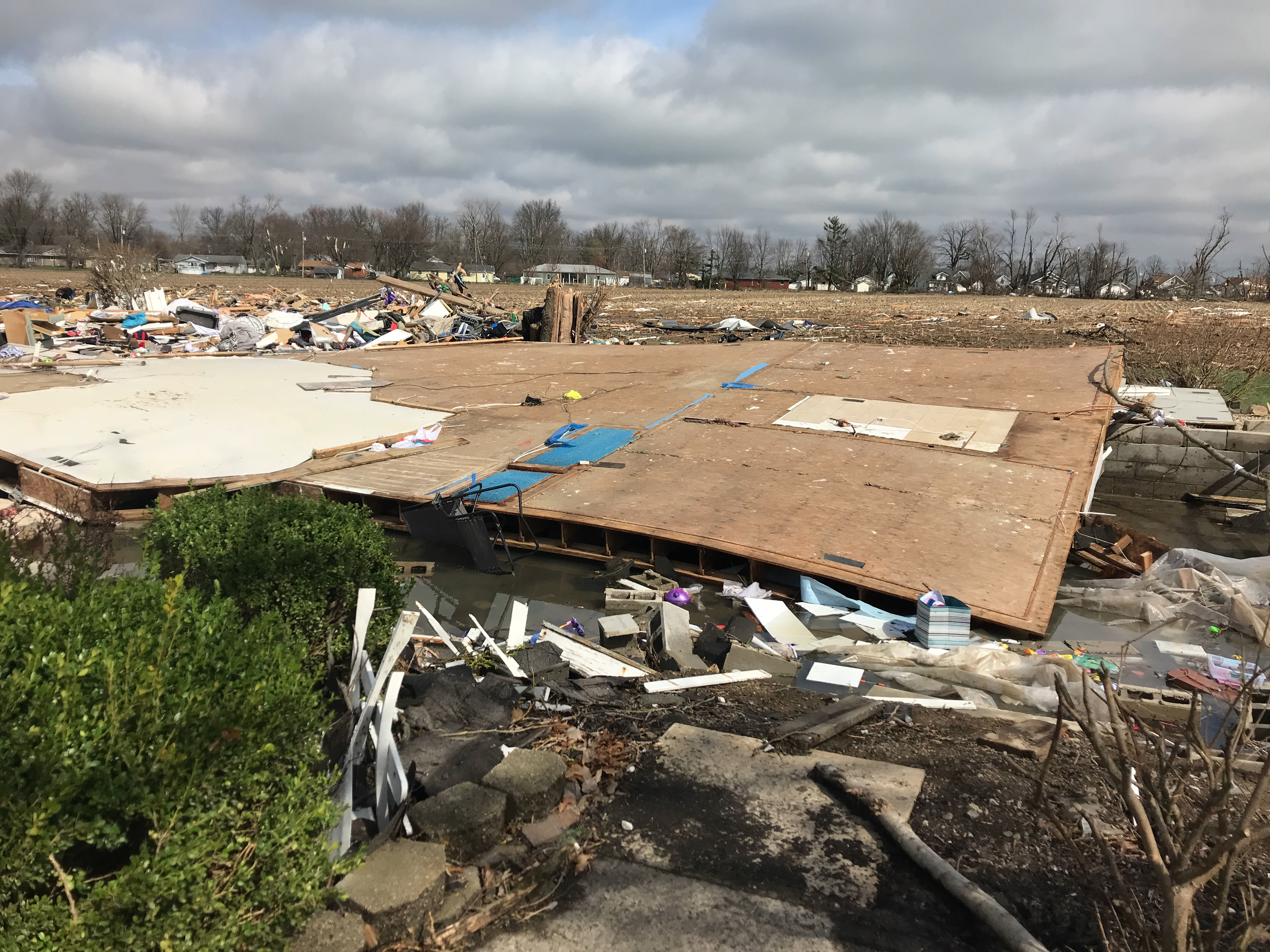
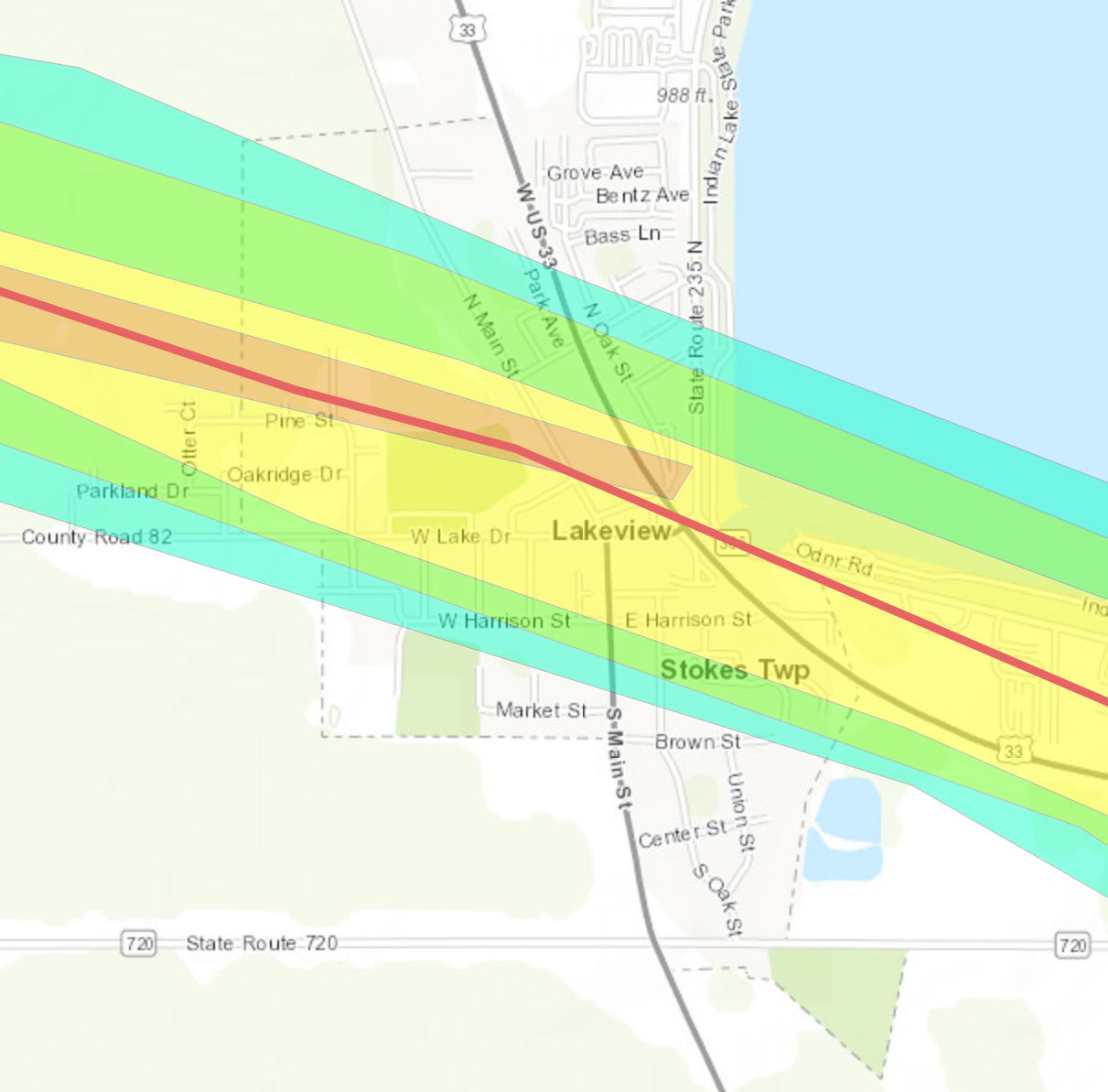
- Clockwise from top: The tornado near Lakeview, Ohio; Path intensity map of the tornado as it went through Lakeview; A Poorly-Constructed home in Lakeview destroyed at mid-range EF3 intensity

Meteorological history
- Formed: March 14, 2024, 7:29 p.m. EDT
- Dissipated: March 14, 2024, 8:16 p.m. EDT (UTC–05:00)
- Duration: 47 minutes

EF3 tornado
- on the Enhanced Fujita scale
- Max width: 1,000 yards (0.57 mi; 0.91 km)
- Highest winds: 155 mph (249 km/h)

Overall effects
- Fatalities: 3
- Injuries: 27
- Damage: $6 million (2024 USD)
- Areas affected: Auglaize County, Logan County
- Part of the Tornado outbreak of March 13–15, 2024 and Tornadoes of 2024

On the evening hours of Thursday, March 14, 2024, an intense and deadly EF3 tornado impacted multiple towns and communities across Auglaize and Logan counties in Ohio. Significant to major damage occurred Fryburg, Lakeview, and Russells Point, killing three people and injuring 27 people along its 31.33 miles (50.42 km) path. The tornado caused $6 million in damage, and reached a peak width of 1,000 yd (910 m). The tornado was a part of significant tornado outbreak that span from March 13 to March 15 and was the second strongest tornado of the outbreak, reaching an estimated peak winds of 155 mph (249 km/h), and was the deadliest tornado of the outbreak.

The tornado initially touched down west of Fryburg at 7:29 p.m. EDT, quickly intensifying to low-end EF3 intensity. Several homes and a business were heavily damaged, trees were snapped or debarked, and many RV trailers were destroyed. The tornado tore through rural areas, impacting several farmsteads at EF1-EF2 intensities, carving cycloidal marks onto fields, and blowing down several trees and power poles. The tornado then went through Lakeview, heavily damaging or destroying multiple homes and businesses, severely debarking trees, and demolishing several mobile homes. Then the tornado impacted several neighborhoods along Indian Lake at EF2 intensity, damaging or destroying more manufactured homes, blowing down outbuildings, and inflicting moderate to severe damage to framed homes. Afterwards, the tornado traveled through rural areas and causing light-moderate damage to structures before dissipating at 8:16 p.m. EDT.

== Meteorological Synopsis ==
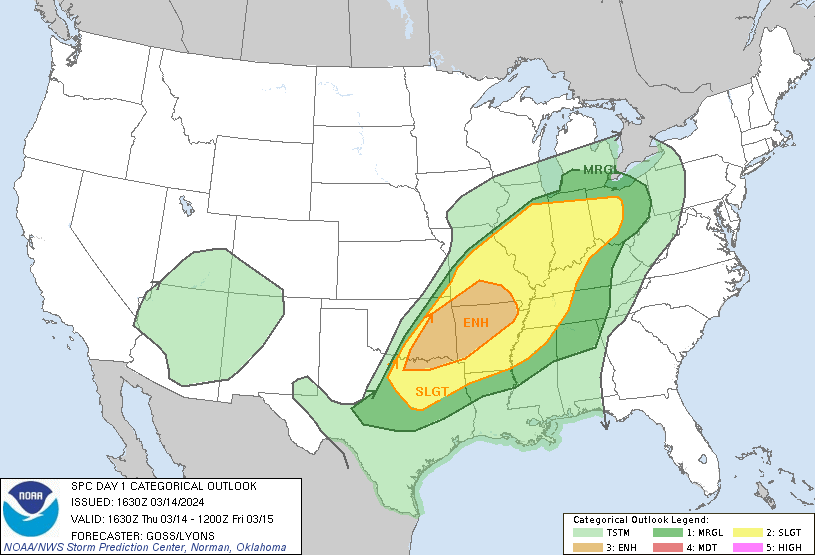
Day One Outlook of the March 14, 2024 tornado outbreak by the Storm Prediction Center.

On March 9, at 3:53 a.m. CST, the Storm Prediction Center issued a day 6 outlook over northeast Texas, the Ark-La-Tex region, and southeast Oklahoma, with a 15% probability for severe weather. An upper-low was expected to traverse over the southwest states, with moderately strong southwesterly winds aloft along with surface dewpoints reaching into the 60s east of the dryline and near southeast of the synoptic front across the southern plains to the Ozarks. The next day on March 10, the coverage of the 15% outline expanded.

On March 11, the medium range guidance models depicted a deep, positively-tilted upper trough traversing and spreading over the Western United States, with the troughing being anchored by a closed low over the lower Colorado River basin, with moderately strong mid-level flow traversing across the Southwest into the central and southern plains. A shortwave trough was expected to move northeasterly within a belt of stronger flow, albeit with some uncertainties with forecast timing, though the evolution of the surface low moving northeasterly ahead of the low and the cold front moving across southern and Central United States remained consistent. Before the cold front, a moist and unstable airmass and thunderstorms were forecasted to be along and ahead of the front, with the expected evolution being initiation at the triple point in the late morning to early afternoon hours, with moderate southwesterly flow aloft and buoyancy leading to the development of strong to severe thunderstorms, with the main hazards expected to be large hail and damaging wind gusts.

On March 12, at 2:31 a.m. CST, an expansive slight risk was issued, stretching from Texas up to Eastern Iowa, with a 15% probability for severe weather, with hatched areas of significant weather for the Ark-La-Tex region, and northern Missouri, southern Iowa, and western Illinois. A surface low was forecasted to propagate over the Nebraska, Iowa, and Missouri border region, with the cold front extending from the low across eastern Kansas into the Texas Hill Country. A large warm sector was expected ahead of the cold front, extending from the northern to southern Mississippi River valleys, to westward into the southern Plains, with showers and thunderstorms expected to be present in the warm sector, though early-morning storms were not expected. The warm sector was expected to destabilize, with two areas of potential severe weather in the Midwest and southern Plains. In the Midwest risk, dewpoints in the upper 50s were expected south of the warm front, with adequate low-level moisture and decent to strong buoyancy were expected in the early afternoon, with surface temperature reaching into the 70s along with cold-mid level temperatures resulting in steep mid-level lapse rates. Low-level convergence could result in convective initiation and the development of supercells, with expectation of all hazards including tornadoes.

Radar progression of the March 14, 2024 tornado outbreak.

On March 14, at 1:00 a.m. CDT, an enhanced risk for hail and tornado was issued, including a 10% risk for tornado for Oklahoma, Missouri, and Arkansas, with a 5% risk for tornado across the mid-Mississippi Valley to Ohio and other parts of Oklahoma, Texas, Arkansas, and Missouri. Early morning showers and thunderstorms were expected, with most of them staying north of the warm front, with some threats of hail and damaging gusts. The early storms were expected to modulate the effective frontal zone and how severe the destabilization of the environment could be, lowering confidence for a supercell cluster, though the expansion of the steep, mid-level, lapse-rate plume, along with substantial deep-layer shear and hodograph enlargement, led to the increase in the 5% tornado risk.

== Tornado summary ==
=== Formation ===
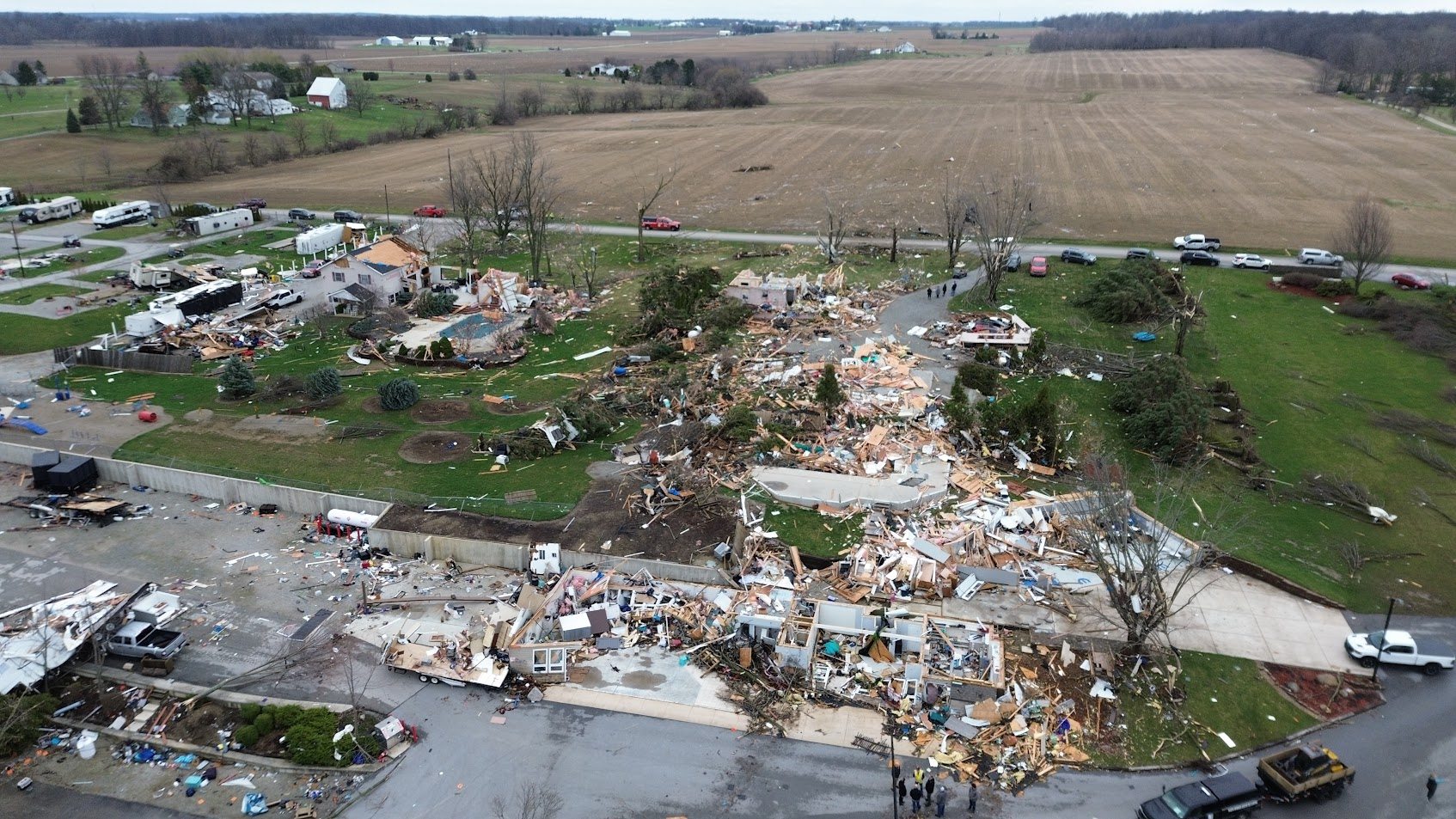
Severe damage inflicted on the Glacier Hill Clubhouse building at low-end EF3 intensity.

At 7:27 p.m. EDT, the National Weather Service (NWS) office at Wilmington, Ohio issued a radar indicated tornado warning for Shelby, Auglaize, Logan, and Hardin counties. Soon, the tornado touched down west of Fryburg at 7:29 p.m. EDT, initially inflicting major damage to a farm building and minor roof damage to a home along Cemetery Road at EF0 intensity. The tornado intensified slightly, uprooting and snapping several trees at EF1-EF2 intensity. The tornado entered the northern parts of Fryburg, quickly intensifying to low-end EF3 strength, snapping or severely debarking several hardwood trees and multiple campers were lofted and destroyed. Afterwards, the Glacier Hill Clubhouse building was struck, receiving heavy damage, and leaving a few interior walls standing. A nearby home also received heavy damage, with most of the structure collapsing and leaving a few interior walls standing. Hardwood trees were snapped or debarked and another home had their exterior walls collapsed. Two injuries were inflicted to people in the resort.

The tornado exited the community, snapping and uprooting several trees and inflicting moderate roof damage to two farm homes. The tornado crossed Town Line Road, causing moderate roof damage was inflicted to a home. The tornado continued southeast, heavily damaging or destroying two outbuildings and snapping power poles at estimated windspeeds of 100 mph (160 km/h). The tornado then impacted a farmstead near the community of Geyer, demolishing a couple of outbuildings and sweeping a couple of empty silos. The tornado impacted a home along Geyer Drive, blowing down the garage and inflicting moderate roof damage and several hardwood trees were snapped and uprooted. Then, the tornado struck a farmstead along County Road 65, damaging and heavily demolishing a couple of outbuildings, snapping wooden power poles, and uprooting and snapping trees. The tornado then impacted another farmstead along Wrestle Creek Road, inflicting moderate roof damage onto the farmhouse and demolishing an outbuilding.

=== Lakeview and Peak Intensity ===
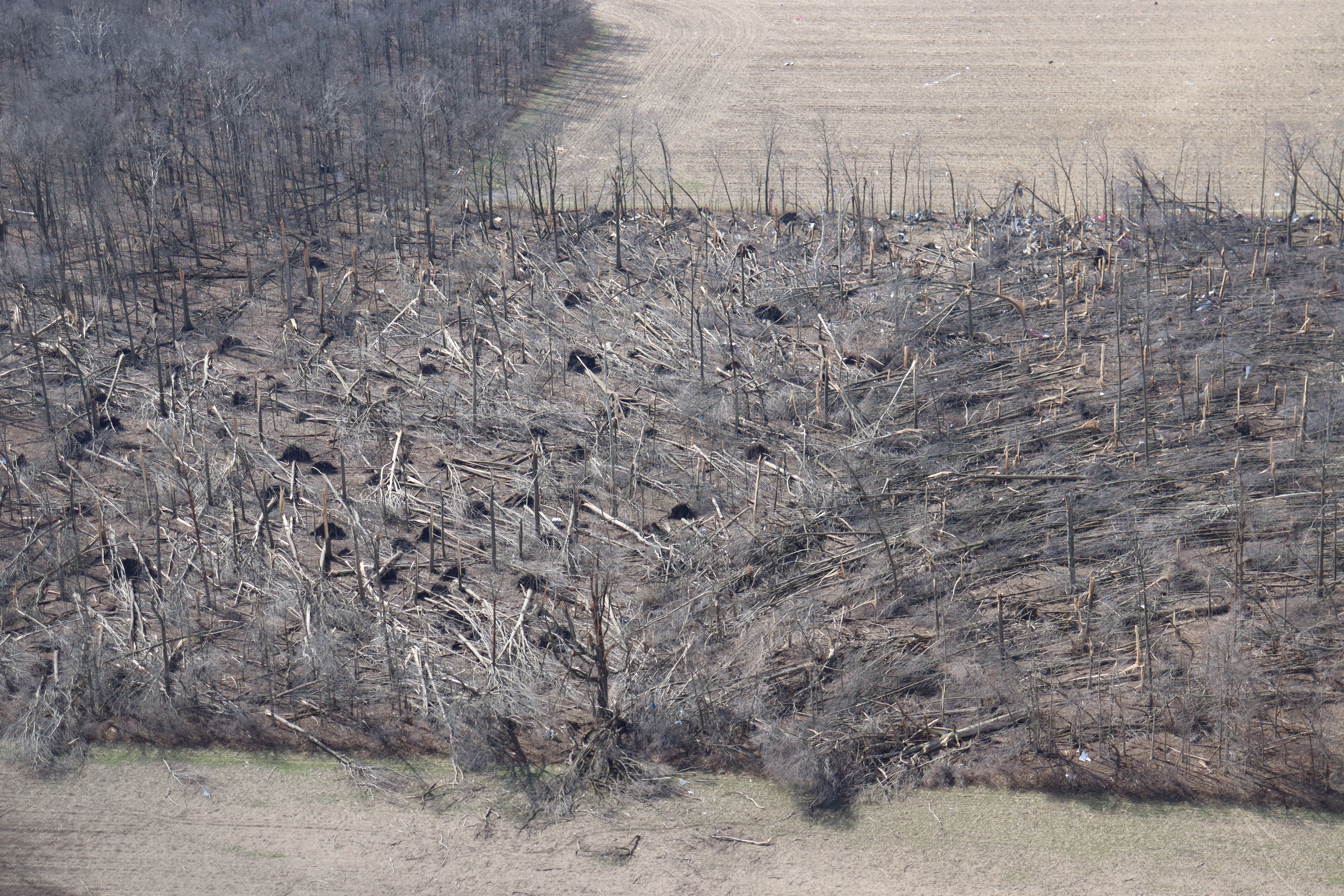
Trees snapped and debarked near Lakeview, Ohio at EF3 intensity.

Afterwards, the tornado began carving cycloidal marks onto the field before impacting a forest, snapping and uprooting multiple hardwood trees. The tornado intensified further as a farmstead along Valley Road was struck, blowing down an exterior wall of the farmhouse, snapping multiple trees on the property, and inflicting minimal roof damage to another farmhouse. Then the tornado went through a forested area snapping more trees. North of the community of Santa Fe, the tornado snapped wooden power poles and multiple trees as it crossed over into Logan County. The tornado carved more cycloidal marks onto fields as another farmstead was impacted, inflicting moderate roof damage to the home and snapping and uprooting trees. Then the tornado intensified as it impacted a farmstead along the intersection of Township Highway 85 and County Road 84, heavily damaging the farmhouse and demolishing several outbuildings at mid-range EF2 intensity. The tornado then plowed through a forested area at low-end EF3 intensity, severely debarking and snapping several hardwood trees.

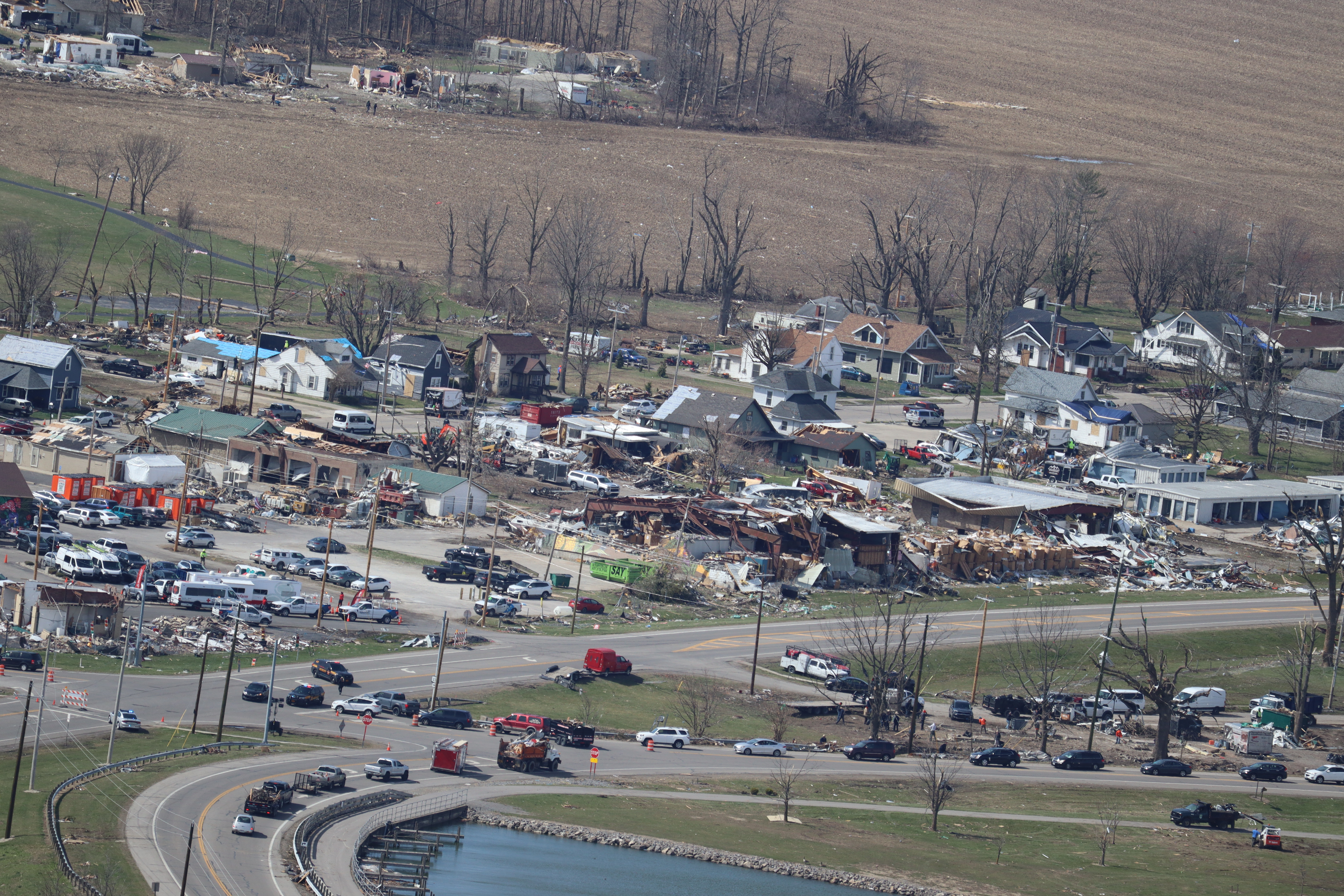
Aerial imagery of severe damage done to downtown Lakeview.

At 7:50 p.m. EDT, the National Weather Service office at Wilmington, Ohio then issued a particularly dangerous situation (PDS) tornado warning for central Logan and northwestern Union counties. After crossing Township Road 83, the tornado entered the first neighborhood of Lakeview, impacting a forested area behind the a line of homes at low-end EF3 intensity, severely debarking and snapping several hardwood trees. Then the tornado impacted homes along Poplar Court at mid-range EF3 intensity, destroying a poorly-constructed home at windspeeds of 150 mph (240 km/h). Multiple homes nearby suffered heavy losses to their exterior walls and several more residences suffered significant roof and structural damage. The tornado then went through downtown Lakeview at peak intensity, with estimated windspeed of 155 mph (249 km/h), inflicting heavy destruction to a large, metal building system west of US 33. Along North Main Street; a laundromat was heavily damaged, two homes sustained intense roof damage, the community's municipal building was damaged, a library sustained significant roof damage, an old plastics building was destroyed, and a couple of low-rise buildings experienced exterior wall and roof damage.

=== Russells Point ===
Another poorly-built home along North Oak Street was demolished at mid-range EF3 intensity, other homes along the road received significant damage, and several outbuildings were destroyed. The tornado continued trekking southeast, impacting the Geiger Mobile Home Park at mid-range EF2 intensity. Multiple single-wide mobile homes were damaged or destroyed, an 81-year-old woman and another 70-year-old woman were killed at this location. The tornado then impacted another mobile home park at mid-range EF2 intensity, rolling and demolishing several trailers and mobile homes, a framed home sustained significant roof damage and trees were snapped. Then the tornado tore through a neighborhood east of the mobile park, inflicting severe roof damage to many homes, destroying multiple mobile homes, damaging or destroying outbuildings, and inflicting moderate to significant tree damage. The tornado briefly intensified to low-end EF3 intensity along Township Highway 239, collapsing an exterior wall from a business, a large retail building across the business had its long roof span mostly damaged.

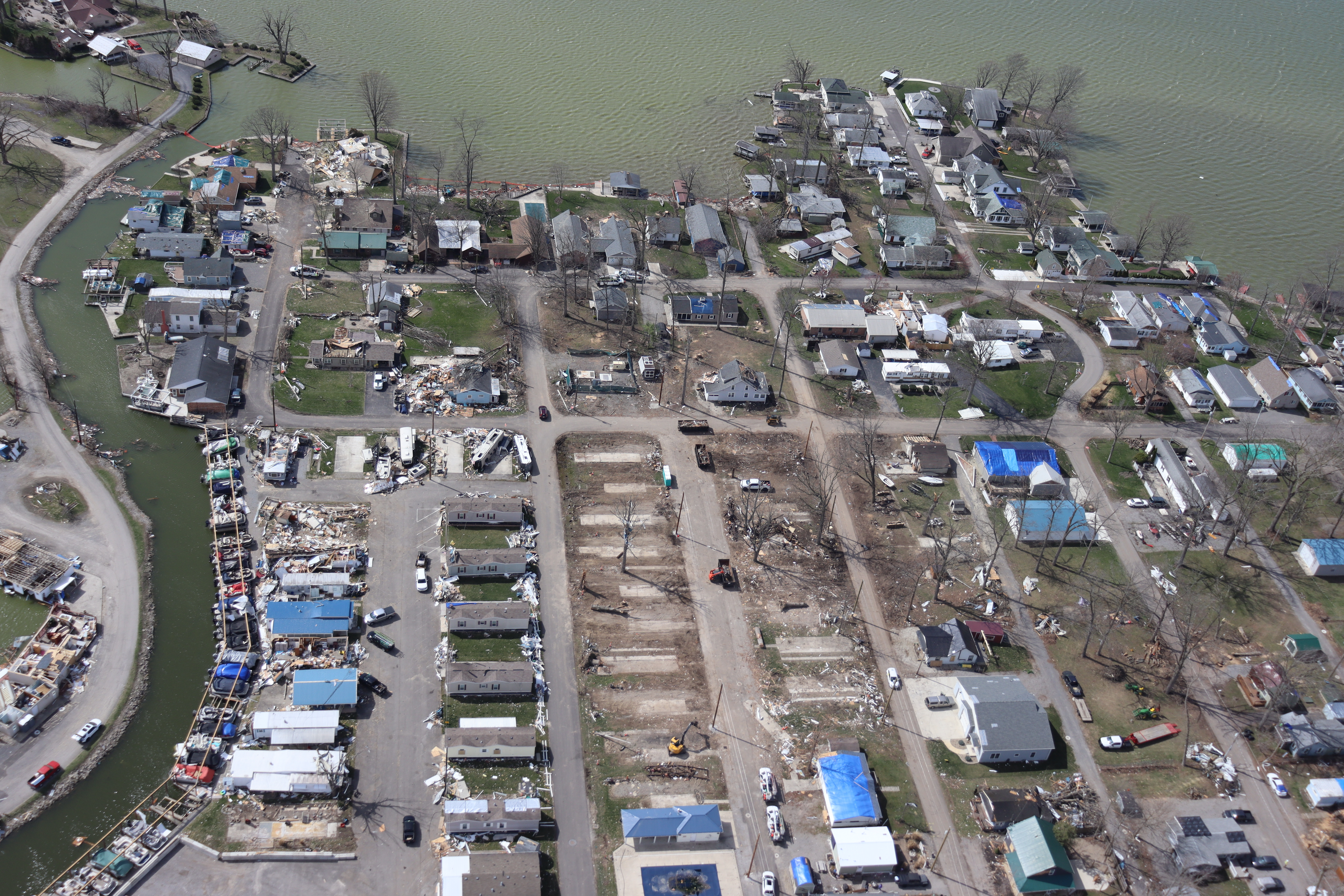
Aerial imagery of severe EF2 damage to multiple structures.

The tornado then impacted a lakeside neighborhood at low-end EF2 intensity, where several homes received significant roof damage and trees were uprooted before the tornado crossed into Indian Lake. The tornado made landfall onto Orchard Island north of Russells Point, intensifying slightly to mid-range EF2 intensity, several trailers and mobile homes were flipped or destroyed, many homes sustained significant roof damage, an outbuilding was demolished, a home was shifted off its foundation, a warehouse building sustained moderate structural damage, and trees were snapped or uprooted. A 69-year-old man was killed on Orchard Island. The tornado crossed into Indian Lake again, making landfall onto another lakeside neighborhood at mid-range EF2 intensity, inflicting significant roof damage to several homes, moderate damage to outbuildings, and snapping and uprooting trees The tornado briefly crossed the lake for the third time before impacting another lakeside neighborhood along Main Lane at high-end EF1 intensity, inflicting moderate roof damage to homes, unroofing an outbuilding, and snapping trees. The tornado intensified slightly along SR 368, toppling a free standing pole and ripping panels off of a couple metal building systems.

=== Dissipation ===
The tornado maintained intensity crossing SR 366, heavily damaging a two-story home and leveling two nearby outbuildings. An outbuilding further downstream of the highway was demolished at high-end EF1 intensity, another outbuilding and metal building system nearby received moderate roof damage. The tornado maintained high-end EF1 intensity, impacting and damaging a warehouse, demolishing an outbuilding, and uprooting trees. The tornado passed through rural areas north of Huntsville, inflicting moderate roof damage to farmhouse and destroying an outbuilding. The tornado then crossed County Road 39, flipping a truck and leveling an outbuilding. For several more miles, the tornado lightly damaging homes and outbuildings. The tornado intensified to EF1 strength, leveling an outbuilding on a farmstead along County Road 118. Then, the tornado impacted a forested area along County Road 26, uprooting and snapping trees and inflicting major roof damage to an outbuilding. The tornado then briefly became significant again, downing an electrical transmission tower. The tornado continued weakening, causing moderate damage to homes, outbuildings, and trees before tornado lifted at 8:16 p.m. EDT. The tornado was on the ground for 31.33 miles (50.42 km) and lasted 47 minutes and reached a peak width of 1,000 yd (910 m).

== Impacts and aftermath ==
In Auglaize County, the tornado inflicted $1 million in damage and two injuries were recorded. In Logan County, the tornado inflicted $5 million in damage, three fatalities were recorded, along with 25 injuries. Throughout the tornado's path, 200 homes were damaged or destroyed in Lakeview and other communities. Local officials of Logan County declared a mass-causality incident as collapsed buildings, entrapments, and fatalities were reported.

The Governor of Ohio, Mike DeWine, declared a state of emergency for 11 counties affected by the tornadoes from the March 14 outbreak, including Auglaize and Logan counties. The declaration ordered several state agencies, including the Ohio Emergency Management Agency and Ohio Department of Public Safety, to provide help and resources to the affected counties. Along with that, Governor DeWine also activated the Ohio National Guard to aid in clearing storm debris in Logan County.

=== Rebuilding ===
Two years after the tornado in 2026, 193 properties were recovered, either through private insurance, Federal Emergency Management Agency (FEMA) support, or assistance from Small Business Administration. An American non-profit organization, Habitat for Humanity, identified 22 pieces of land for housing development, to house the families impacted by the tornado. During the rebuilding effort in Logan County, the county was awarded $14.3 million through the Community Development Block Grant – Disaster Relief program. Initially, the county was set to receive $12.15 million, with the rest going to the neighboring Auglaize County. Soon though, it was determined that Auglaize County had no qualified projects, allocating all the funding money to Logan County. A committee was formed to determine how the funding will be spent. The funding was divided into four categories, including $300,000 set aside for demolition, infrastructure improvements, and housing projects. The plan changed later on after learning that the grant could not be used for demolition.

== See also ==
- List of F3, EF3, and IF3 tornadoes (2020–present)
- List of United States tornadoes from January to March 2024
