= 1856 Philadelphia tornado =

1856 FU tornado in Pennsylvania, US

Meteorological history
- Formed: April 12, 1856
- Duration: 10-15 minutes

Tornado

Overall effects
- Injuries: 9
- Damage: $100,000 ($3.23 million in 2025 dollars)
- Areas affected: Philadelphia, Pennsylvania

On April 12, 1856, a strong derecho struck the city of Philadelphia, Pennsylvania. In the morning hours, Philadelphia was experiencing high westernly winds, with little rain and humid air. It was around 10 pm where winds started to pick up, occupied with lightning, and hail. The storm was most felt at Northern Philadelphia, where the tornado struck. This tornado might have been part of a tornado family, as 30 minutes before the Philadelphia tornado struck, another tornado struck West Chester, killing one. This tornado also may have been part of a Derecho event producing an outbreak, as another strong tornado struck Alliance, Ohio, and storm damage reported from Chicago to Cleveland down to New Jersey.

== Impact ==
The tornado formed in Chester County, between 9:30 and 10 pm moving east, striking Norristown, tearing fences. The tornado continued to move east, knocking down a train and then turned more southeast until it struck Northeast Philadelphia at 10 pm, lasting for 10 to 15 minutes, immediately smashing windows, lifting signs, damaging and unroofing 200 houses. The estimated damage caused by the tornado is said to be around $100,000 ($2.51 million in 2018). The tornado continued southeast and struck Camden.

Several trains were knocked off of their rails; one loaded with 10 cars was moved 100 yards on the track, with 5 of the cars blown off. Two large brick churches and three factories were unroofed in Kensington, with parts of the roof landing and demolishing a two-story frame building that had 6 children in the lower floor. Five houses were completely destroyed. The worst damage from this tornado was a large boiler house of the Franklin Iron Works that was completely demolished. After the tornado dissipated, the storm itself would still cause damage, lifting a shed 150 yards in Tacony, stripping and damaging many buildings in Newark, blowing down a house near Elkton, killing two, blowing in a church in Bridgewater, ripping a roof off of a bridge in Beaver, and blowing down the York Furnace Bridge.

The tornado caused telegraph line outages lasting several days west of Philadelphia.

== Aftermath ==
The tornado left North Philadelphia in ruins, leaving 9 injured. The storm damaged most of eastern Pennsylvania.
