= Manzanita tornado =

2016 tornado in Manzanita, Oregon

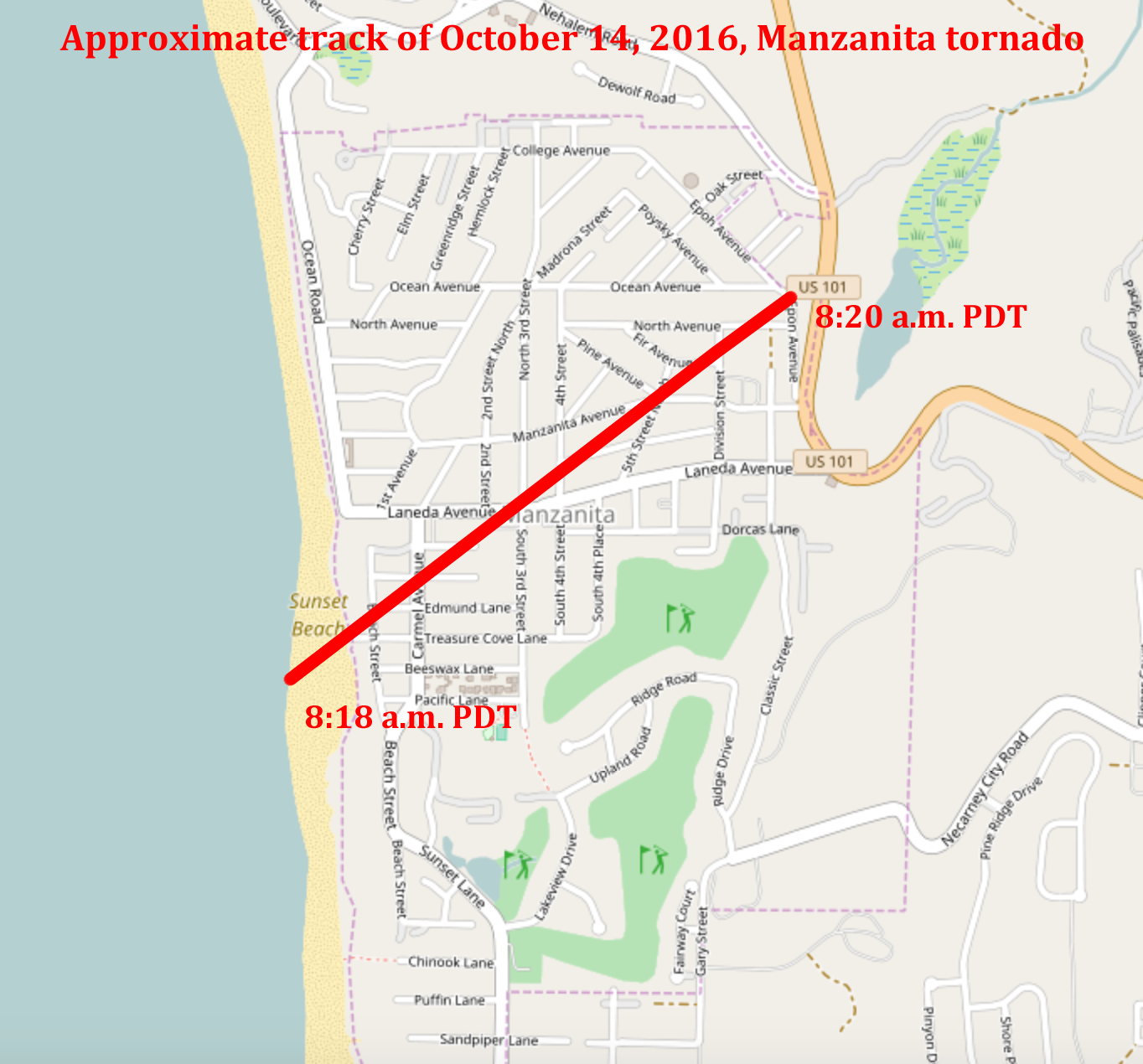
- Approximate track of the tornado through Manzanita

Meteorological history
- Formed: 8:18 a.m. PDT (15:18 UTC), October 14, 2016
- Dissipated: 8:20 a.m. PDT (15:20 UTC), October 14, 2016
- Duration: 2 minutes

EF2 tornado
- on the Enhanced Fujita scale
- Highest winds: 125–130 mph (201–209 km/h)

Overall effects
- Fatalities: None reported
- Damage: $1 million
- Areas affected: City of Manzanita, Oregon
- Part of the tornado outbreaks of 2016

In the morning hours of October 14, 2016, a rare and strong tornado struck the city of Manzanita, Oregon. A powerful extratropical cyclone traversing the Pacific Ocean produced localized supercell thunderstorms along coastal Oregon. The Portland branch of the National Weather Service issued a record-breaking ten tornado warnings that morning for their forecast area. One particular cell spawned an EF2 tornado at 8:18 a.m. PDT (15:18 UTC) which traveled through the center of Manzanita. Although it lasted only two minutes, the tornado damaged 128 homes, rendered one uninhabitable, and downed one-third of the city's trees. No injuries or deaths were reported and damage reached $1 million.

A state of emergency was declared for Manzanita immediately after the tornado; however, clean-up operations had to be delayed for two days as another storm system impacted the region. In the months following the tornado, approximately $70,000 was raised through various donations.

== Meteorological synopsis ==
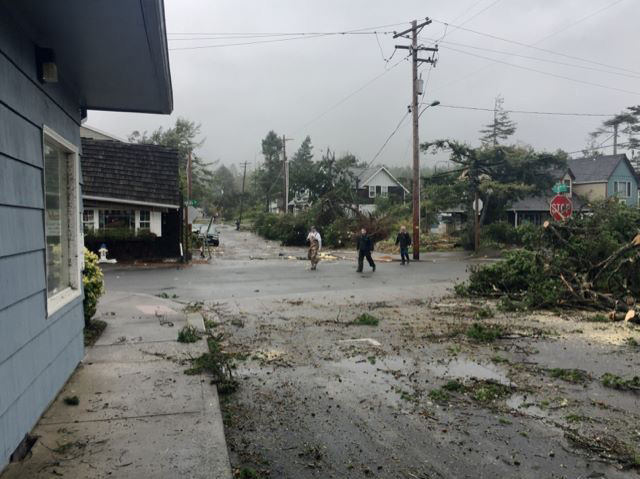
Damage and debris from the tornado

During the overnight hours of October 13–14, 2016, a powerful extratropical cyclone approached the Pacific Northwest. The Storm Prediction Center noted a low possibility for thunderstorms in association with this system as it neared the coast, and primarily focused on the large-scale damaging wind threat. Atmospheric instability only reached modest levels locally, represented by convective available potential energy (CAPE) values of 200–400 J/kg. Low-level wind shear reached values just supportive enough for tornadic development within low-topped thunderstorms developing along a cold front offshore. Subsequent enhancement of mid-level lapse rates from cold air aloft in combination with the aforementioned factors yielded a localized environment favorable to low-topped supercells along the immediate Oregon coast.

Several potentially tornadic storms developed during the morning hours and impacted the state, prompting a flurry of tornado warnings by the Portland branch of the National Weather Service. Ten tornado warnings were issued that day, the most ever by the office in a 24-hour period and almost as many as the total number issued between 1986 and 2015. At 8:16 a.m. PDT (15:16 UTC), a warning was issued for Tillamook County for a rotating thunderstorm. Two minutes later, a waterspout moved ashore along Treasure Cove Lane in Manzanita. The tornado traveled approximately 0.7 miles (1.1 km) through the center of the city, reaching a maximum width of 225 yards (206 m) and causing extensive damage, before dissipating two minutes later near Highway 101. Peak winds in the tornado were estimated at 125–130 mph (201–209 km/h), ranking it as a high-end EF2 on the Enhanced Fujita Scale. The parent thunderstorm soon encountered a more stable environment and weakened as it continued inland. A second tornado, also originating as a waterspout, was confirmed in Oceanside—18 miles (29 km) south of Manzanita—around 9:00 a.m. PDT (16:00 UTC), dissipated without causing damage, and was rated EFU.

With two confirmed tornadoes, the October 14, 2016, event marked the first time since November 12, 1991, that more than one tornado touched down in a single day in Northwest Oregon. Furthermore, the Manzanita tornado was only the fifth tornado in Tillamook County since reliable records began in 1950.

== Impact and aftermath ==
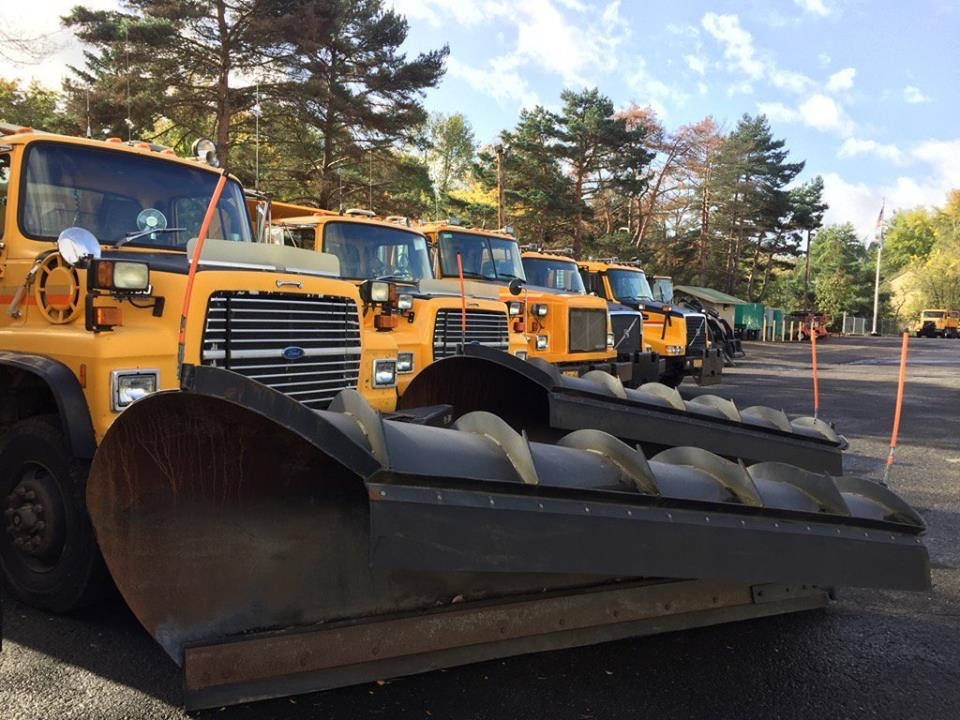
Snowplows were used to assist in clearing debris from roadways.

Although a short-lived tornado, the storm tracked directly through Manzanita and inflicted widespread damage. Assessments by the Tillamook County Sheriff and National Weather Service showed that 128 of the city's 600 homes sustained varying damage. Some homes had their windows blown out. Two businesses were destroyed and one home was rendered uninhabitable; multiple structures lost their roof. One home was shifted 19 inches (48 cm) off its cinderblock foundation. Approximately one-third of the trees in Manzanita were downed or otherwise damaged. Damage in the city amounted to $1 million. The tornado and thunderstorm left 500 of the city's residents without power; 2,500 people suffered power outages across Tillamook County from the storms as a whole.

Manzanita Mayor Garry Bullard declared a state of emergency immediately following the tornado. A public shelter was temporarily opened at the Calvary Bible Church by the American Red Cross for displaced residents, and volunteers from the relief group arrived to provide aid. However, residents were initially advised to shelter in place due to continued inclement weather. Additionally, 35 members of the Emergency Volunteer Corps of Nehalem Bay traveled to the city to help direct traffic and provide any assistance requested of them. The group opened two emergency shelters and provided food to residents and emergency officials. As a precautionary measure, volunteer firefighters were called in and an extra ambulance was provided by Tillamook County to the city. Soon after the tornado, another powerful storm system—associated with the remnants of Typhoon Songda—impacted the region, forcing residents to make quick, temporary repairs and delaying clean-up efforts until October 16. Heavy machinery, including snowplows, was brought in to clear roads, with assistance from local contractors. State and local officials asked people to avoid the damaged area for three days after the tornado.

Residents of Manzanita, a tourism-driven community, banded together to establish a relief fund for affected home and business owners. In the months following the tornado, approximately $70,000 was raised through donations: $31,000 through various GoFundMe charities (including $1,000 from the company itself), $18,000 from mail-in individual donations, $17,000 through local fundraisers, and $2,625 though CARE. The City of Manzanita spent $35,000 to remove debris by November 10. Reconstruction of damage homes began in November; however, insurance freezes delayed efforts. More than 200 trees were replanted by community members after Thanksgiving.

Widespread strong winds from the parent storm system left 15,000 people without power in Oregon. Winds gusted up to 103 mph (166 km/h) at Cape Meares while Portland saw its rainiest October 13 since reliable records began. The inclement weather prompted multiple schools to delay openings on October 13 and 14.

== See also ==
- List of North American tornadoes and tornado outbreaks
