= Serra do Japi =

Mountain range in São Paulo state, Brazil

Coordinates: 23°16′S 46°58′W

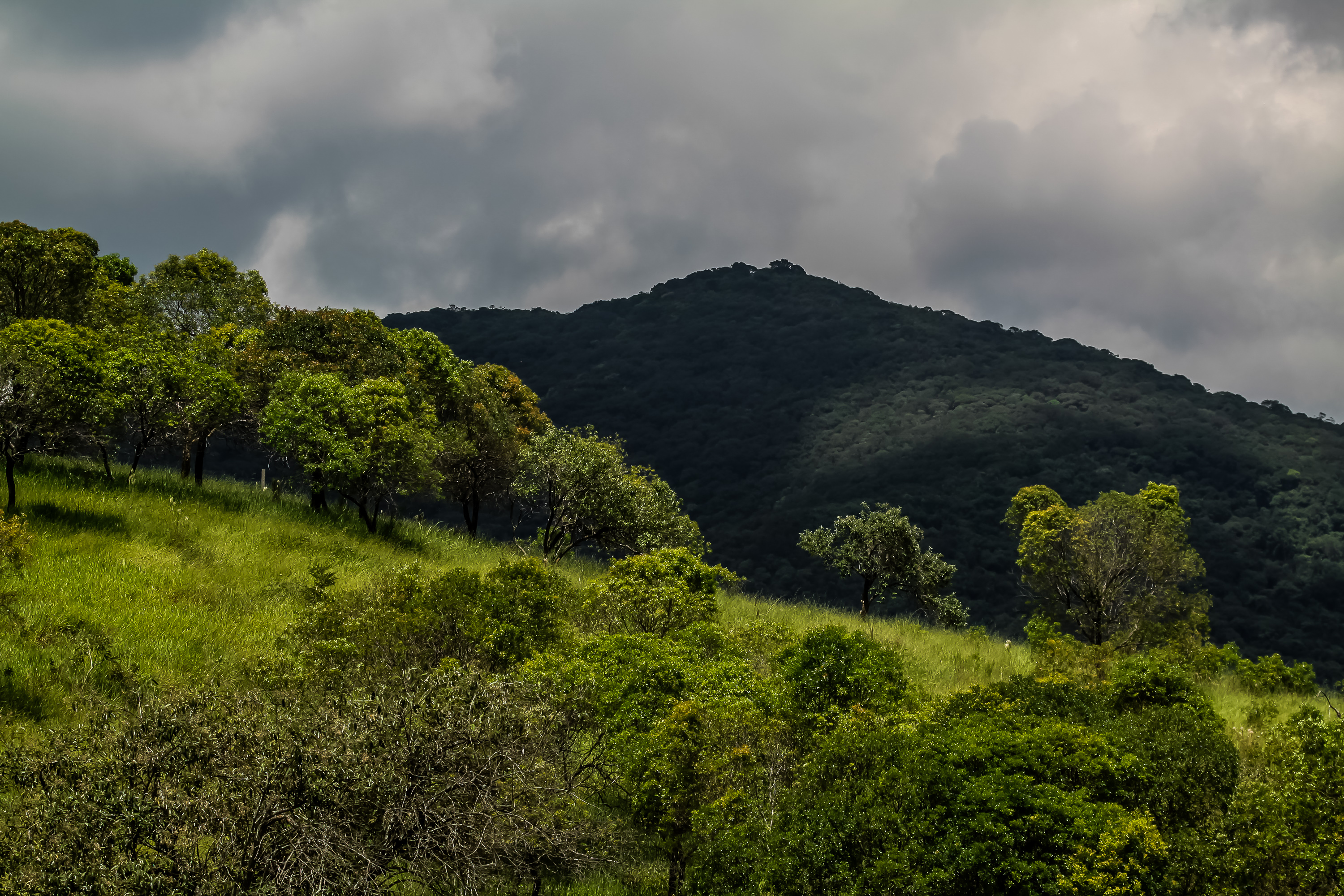
Partial view of the range.

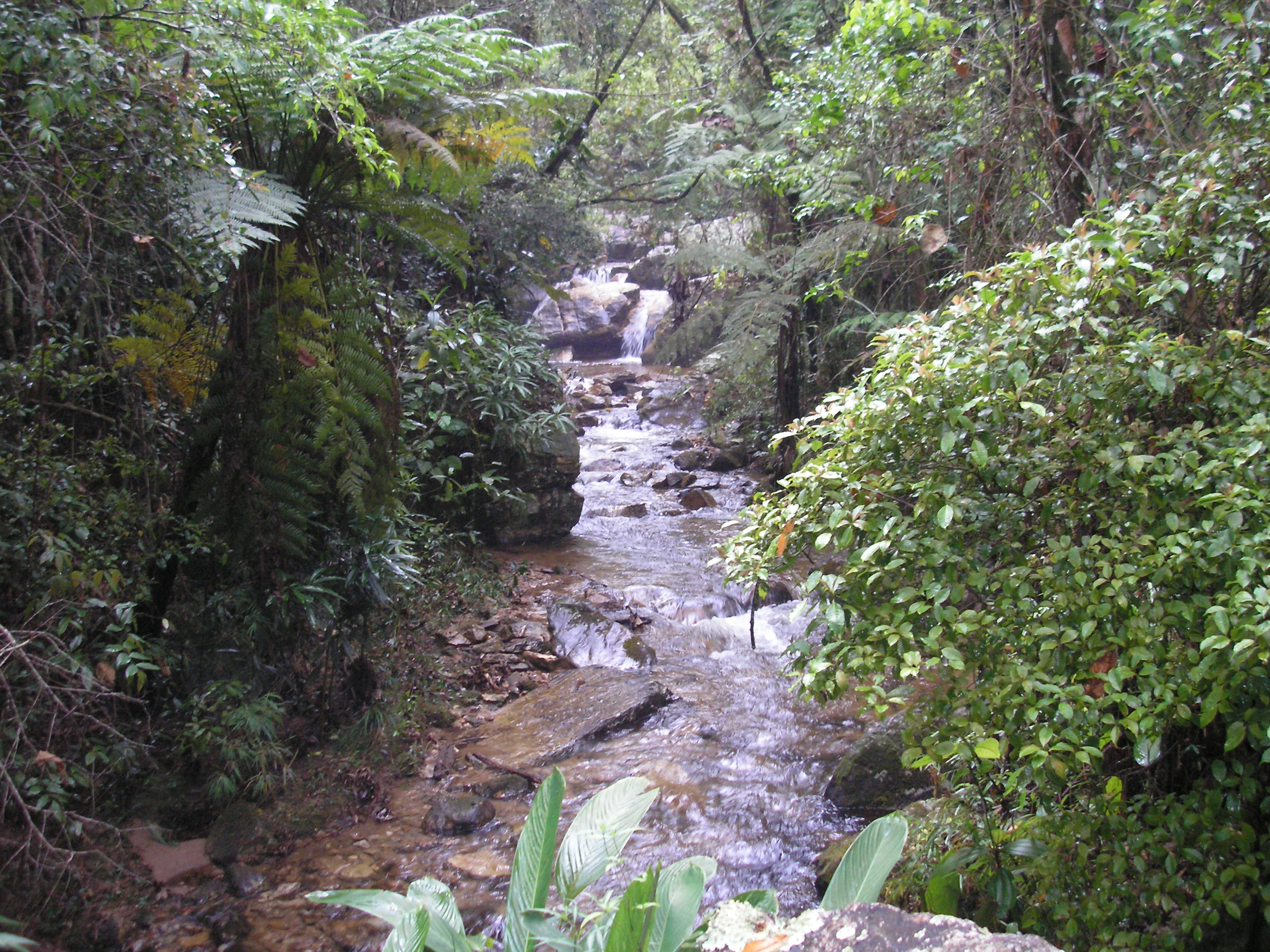
Biological reserve of Serra do Japi

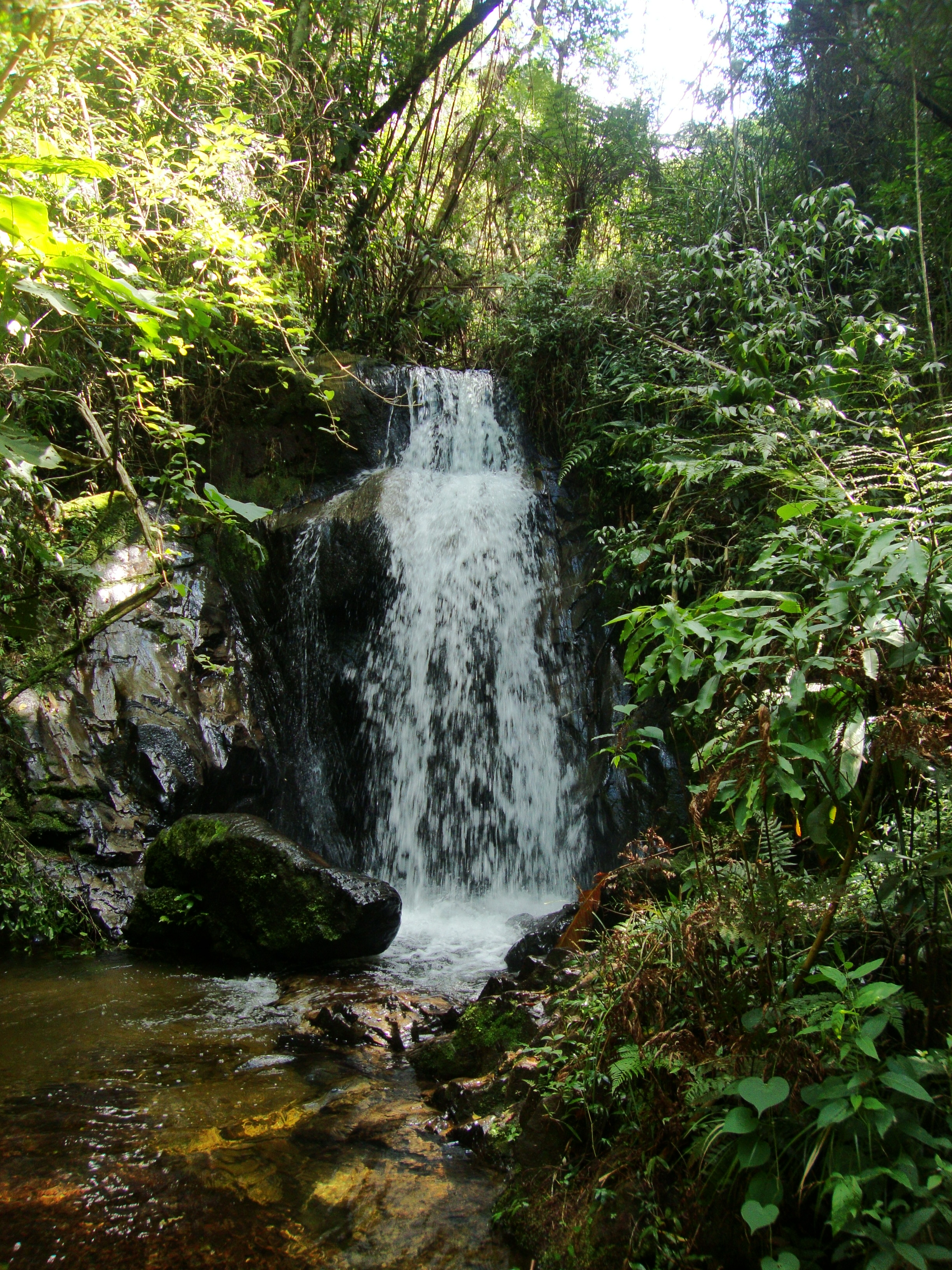
Jabuticabeiras waterfall.

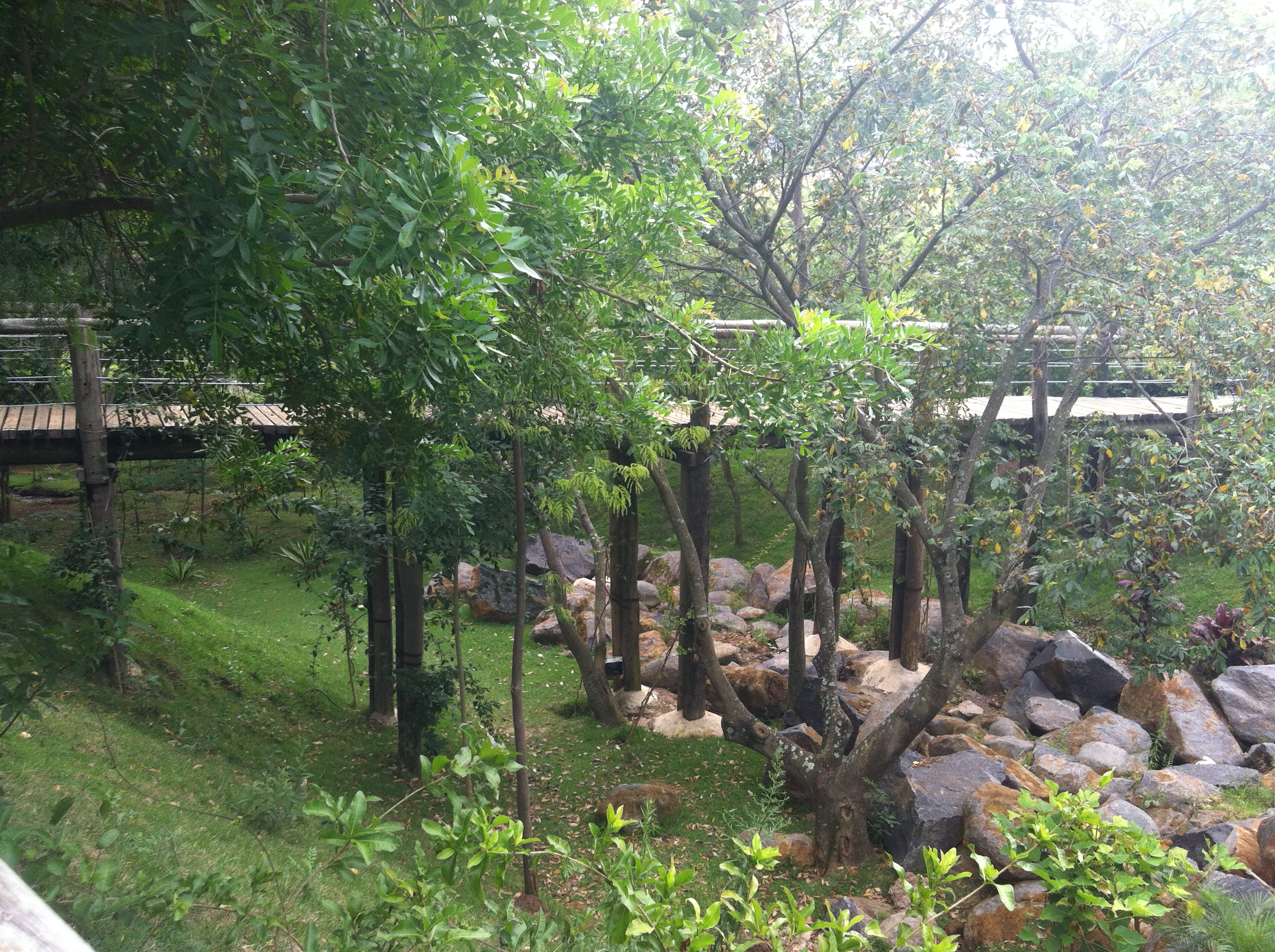
A pedestrian bridge crossing a ravine.

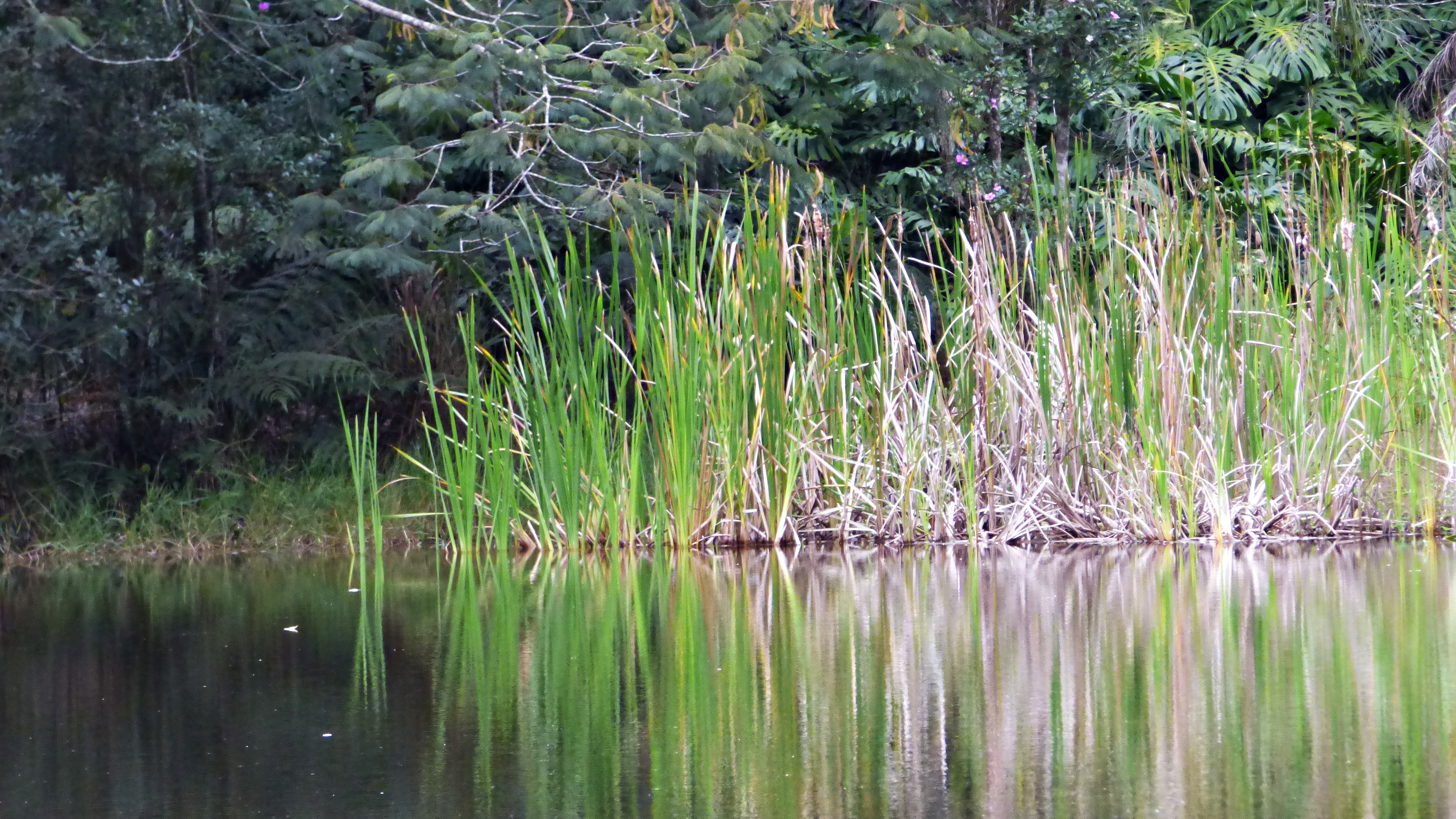
View of marshy area within the preserve of the Serra do Japi.

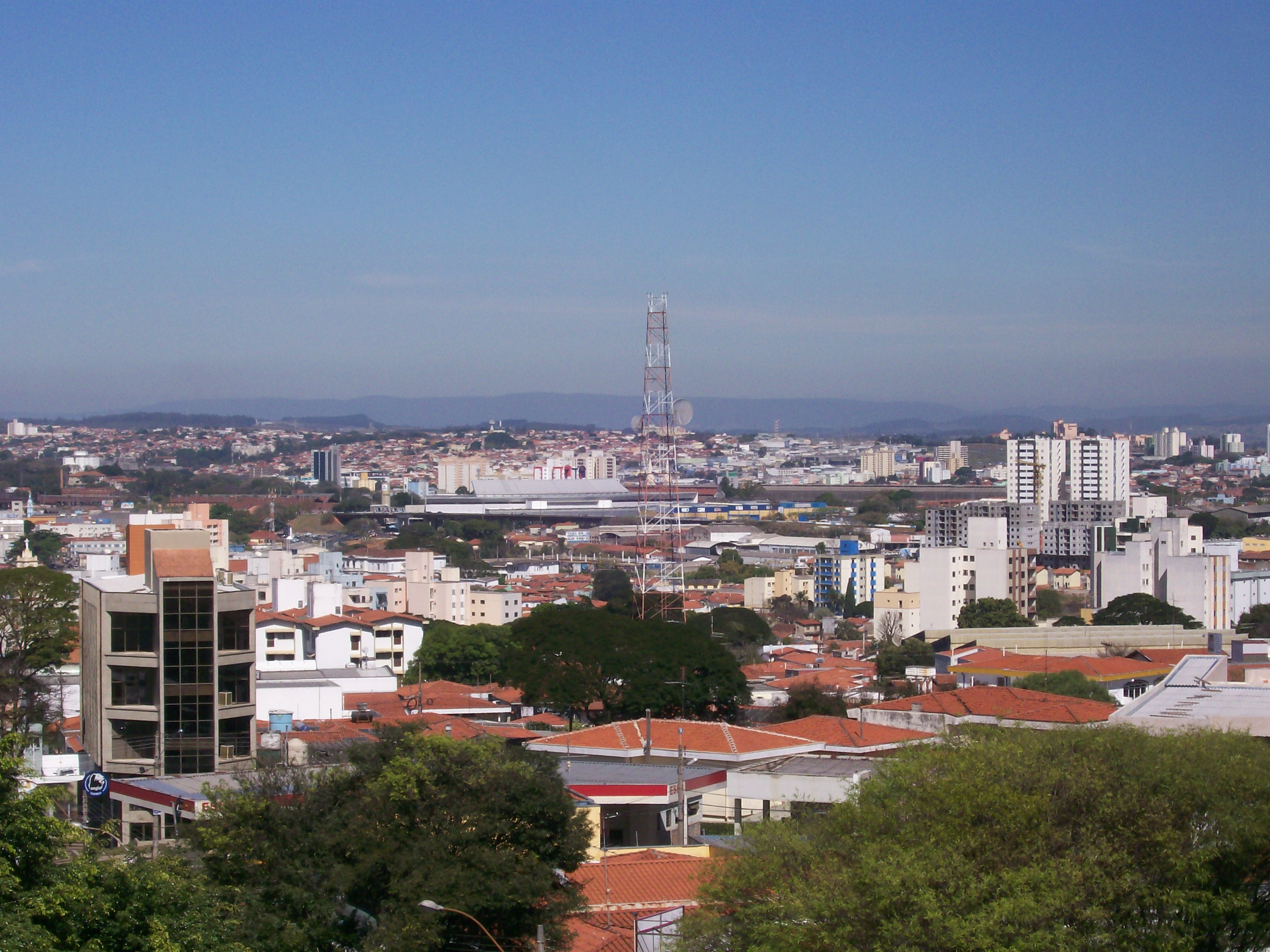
The Serra do Japi as seen from the city of Campinas, São Paulo at a distance of 40 kilometers (50 miles) to the south.

Serra do Japi is a small mountain range located in the southeast of the state of São Paulo, with an area of 354 square kilometers (220 square miles), with the culmination reaching 1,260 meters (4133 feet) in altitude. The region is a rare remnant of the Mata Atlântica in the interior of the state of São Paulo, bordering four municipalities: Jundiaí, Pirapora do Bom Jesus, Cajamar and Cabreúva, and has a wide variety of fauna and flora.

== Etymology ==
Its name has several justifications, such as the similarity with the song of a bird (iapi or japi), and that in the Tupi-Guarani language iapy means 'spring of rivers'. The hydric wealth of the Serra, deserved the denomination of “castelo de águas” (“castle of waters”) by European naturalists, according to professor Aziz Ab'Saber. This was one of the aspects considered in the process of listing the Serra do Japi by CONDEPHAAT (Council for the Defense of Historical, Archaeological, Artistic and Tourist Heritage), in addition to the existence of a mosaic of representative ecosystems in terms of flora and fauna, capable of functioning as a regulatory mountain space for the maintenance of quality of life.

== Characteristics ==
The natural beauties made up of secondary forests in quartz soil are worthy of preservation as factors of ecological and climatic balance. Listed by CONDEPHAAT, through Resolution 11 dated 8 March 1983 and declared a Biosphere Reserve of the Green Belt of São Paulo by UNESCO in 1994.

The richness of its biodiversity is directly related to the fact that Serra do Japi is located in an ecotonal region, that is, a region where two types of forests meet: the Mata Atlântica characteristic of Serra do Mar and the Mata Atlântica of the state's interior.

Its area consists of a set of important topographical and geological features of the Serras do Japi, Guaxinduva and Jaguacoara, composed of different rocks: quartzites, granites and gneisses.

The Serra do Japi also represents one of the last large areas of continuous forest in the State of São Paulo and is a testament to an exuberant flora and fauna that existed largely in the southeastern region of Brazil.

The differences in altitude, temperature, humidity and soil found in Serra do Japi contributed to the formation of different types of arboreal vegetation. The fragilely implanted slopes and tops of hills function as a genetic bank of tropical vegetation adapted to areas of acidic soils and of low natural fertility, constituting an important refuge for the remaining fauna of the inland crystalline plateaus of the State of São Paulo.

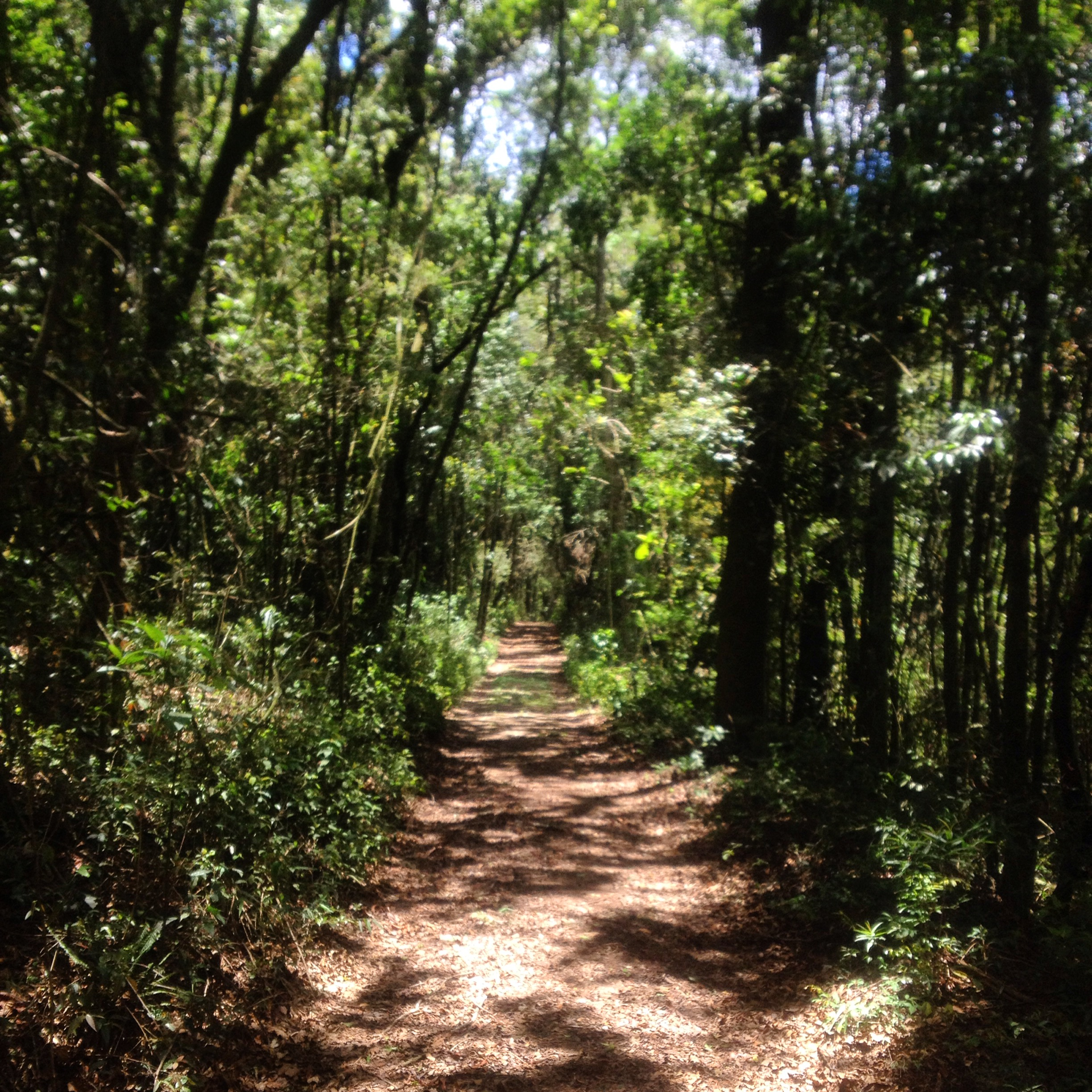
A trail within the Serra do Japi preserve.

It currently has six visitation trails that promote ecotourism.
