= 1991 Springfield tornado =

F4 tornado that struck Springfield, Missouri

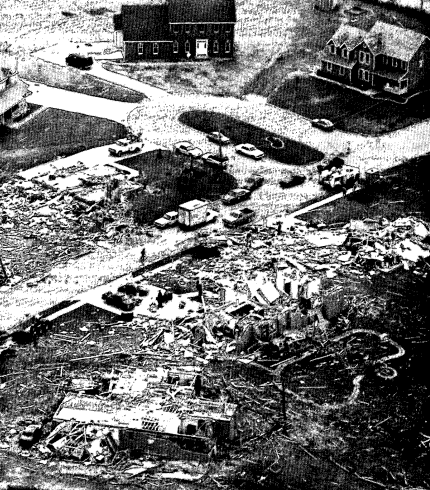
- High-end F4 tornado damage to a home southeast of Springfield, Missouri

Meteorological history
- Formed: November 29, 1991, 6:05 p.m. CDT (UTC−05:00)
- Dissipated: November 29, 1991, 6:25 p.m. CDT (UTC−05:00)
- Duration: 20 minutes

F4 tornado
- on the Fujita scale
- Max width: 400 yards (0.23 mi; 0.37 km)
- Path length: 8 miles (13 km)
- Highest winds: 207–260 mph (333–418 km/h)

Overall effects
- Fatalities: 2
- Injuries: 64
- Damage: $25 million (1991 USD)
- Areas affected: Springfield, Missouri, Nixa, Missouri
- Part of the Tornadoes of 1991

During the evening hours of November 29, 1991, a violent late-season tornado struck the city of Springfield, Missouri, killing two people and injuring 64 others. The tornado inflicted $25 million (1991 USD) in damages, was on the ground for 20 minutes, tracked 8 miles (13 km), and reached a peak width of 400 yards (0.23 mi; 0.37 km). It was also the only F4+ tornado to occur in Greene County, Missouri.

At 6:05 p.m. (Note: For consistency, all times are in Central Daylight Time.) the tornado began 3 miles (4.8 km) north of Nixa, Missouri, tracking northeastward and moving at a speed of 40 miles per hour (64 km/h), quickly strengthening to F3 intensity almost immediantly after touchdown. As the tornado continued northeast, it suddenly began to weaken to F0-F1 intensity as it uprooted trees. The tornado then crossed US 65 where its wind overtook a truck, tossing it a short distance into a frontage road, killing the driver. On the same highway, 10 others were injured due to a multiple-vehicle collision. After crossing US 65, the tornado then strengthened and entered two subdivisions southeast of Springfield at F4 intensity, heavily damaging homes, injuring many and killing one more person. The tornado continued into eastern Springfield before roping out (Note: "Roping out" is a meteorological term for when a tornado reaches the end of its lifecycle, and becomes rope-like in nature shortly before dissipation.) and dissipating west of Turners, Missouri at 6:25 p.m. after being on the ground for 20 minutes.

== Meteorological synopsis ==
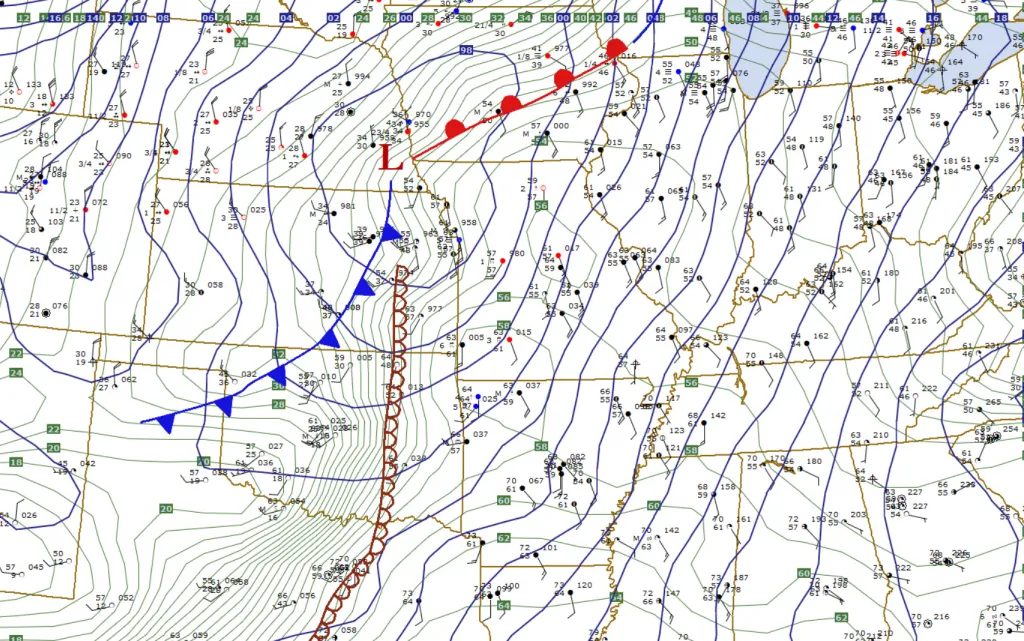
Forecast for Springfield, Missouri on November 29, 1991, effective 6:00 p.m.

On November 29, a strong and long-lived low pressure system was located in the Northern Plains, pushing cold air southward as warm and moist air from the Gulf of Mexico drew northernly towards the storm system. This made the day after Thanksgiving in Springfield, Missouri and other portions of western Missouri unseasonably warm, with an average temperature of 65 °F (18 °C). Later that day, as the cold and warm fronts collided, along with stronger winds aloft, severe thunderstorms and supercells began firing (Note: "Firing up" is a meteorological term for when multiple storms, supercells, or any kind of severe thunderstorm begin to develop and mature in a quick timespan.) over the southern Great Plains as a result, developing along a dryline that tracked from Texas to Kansas, moving easternly towards Missouri and surrounding areas in the Midwest.

One of these thunderstorms intensified and produced the system's first tornadoes. At 6:10 p.m, a short-lived F1 tornado formed in Bates County, An hour afterwards, the Springfield tornado formed in Christian and Greene counties, and at 11:00 p.m, a short-lived F1 tornado formed in Cedar County, Iowa. These were the only three tornadoes to form throughout that day.

== Tornado summary ==
=== Formation and Nixa ===
The tornado touched down at 6:05 p.m. 3 miles (4.8 km) north of Nixa, Missouri, tracking northeasternly towards the city of Springfield, Missouri at a forward speed of 45 miles per hour (72 km/h), promptly strengthening to F3 intensity shortly after touchdown, however, weakening to F0-F1 intensity as it uprooted trees near Nixa. The tornado then continued northeastward where it passed through Lake Springfield, inflicting minor damage to three homes and uprooted multiple trees south of the lake. It then strengthened as it struck a cemetery north of the reservoir and heavily damaged a house at F2-F3 intensity before crossing the interchange between U.S. Route 65 and U.S. Route 60, where the wind overtook a truck and tossed it a short distance, skidding on its roof, before landing in a frontage road along the highway, where the truck driver of the vehicle was killed on impact.

Ten other injuries were also caused on US 65 after a multiple-vehicle collision occurred shortly after the tornado crossed the highway. The tornado then continued northeastward into Southeastern Springfield.

=== Springfield–Woodbridge–Bridge Estates and dissipation ===
As the tornado entered Springfield, it began strengthening as it tracked into the subdivisions of Woodbridge and Natural Bridge Estates in Southeastern Springfield at F3-F4 intensity, striking the residential areas directly at 6:20 p.m. The tornado maintained high-end F4 intensity for 1.5 miles (2.4 km) as it passed through the subdivisions, demolishing 53 homes and causing extensive damage. In Woodbridge, one man was killed on Cara Lane after his home was swept away by the tornado. Dozens of powerlines and telephone poles were toppled over by the winds, and many were injured after the tornado passed the area. Despite the tornado being on the ground and actively inflicting extensive damage, no tornado warning had been issued, and no tornado siren had sounded since touchdown. The only weather warning that had been in effect was a severe thunderstorm warning.

The tornado continued northeast before dissipating near Sunshine Street, and lifting just west of Turners, Missouri at 6:25 p.m. after being on the ground for 20 minutes, and tracking 8 miles (13 km).

== Aftermath ==
After the tornado had passed, Southeastern Springfield, and surrounding areas were heavily damaged following the tornado, with damage estimated to be at $15–25 million (1991 USD) as it tracked 8 miles (13 km) through Christian and Greene Counties. Over 50–64 people were injured by the storm, two were killed, and 36 powerlines were cut down or irreversibly damaged by the tornado, causing a major power outage for the subdivisions affected by the storms. The day after the tornado struck, 12 inches (300 mm) of snow fell throughout a 20–50 miles (32–80 km) wide area over Southeastern Springfield. After the tornado, no looting had occurred.

Multiple organizations were called to aid the city of Springfield, with the American Red Cross giving shelter to residents directly affected by the tornado, and the Salvation Army provided clothing for victims.

=== Damage ===
F4 damage to a two-story home in Southeastern Springfield.

The tornado inflicted extensive high-end F4 damage for 1.5 miles (2.4 km) over the Woodbridge and Natural Bridge subdivisions, with the American Red Cross reporting 53 homes completely swept, and 157 others were damaged in some way. Multiple vehicles were found completely crushed, with a Nixa law enforcement officer stating: "It looked like a warzone" The also tornado destroyed 36 powerlines in the Southeastern Springfield areas. Over 64 direct injuries were reported from this tornado.

The tornado wedged multiple wooden beams deep into the ground with its powerful winds, including one that was found embedded deep into the wall of a brick home. The tornado also produced heavy ground scouring that was observed over an earth house that was struck directly by the tornado at peak intensity.

Despite the devastation, there was minimal fatalities due to the tornado occurring the day after Thanksgiving, as many residents were absent for the holiday.

=== Rebuilding efforts ===
The day after the tornado, disaster plan was put in effect by the Greene County Sherrif, restricting foreign access to the subdivisions affected, with locals having to prove their residence to ease debris clean-up operations. National Weather Service (NWS) officials from NWS Springfield began surveying the damage on the same day, with no clear damage estimate in mind.

During Search and rescue, multiple struck homes were completely surrounded by fallen trees and debris, which obstructed emergency vehicles from aiding the wounded. A house also burnt and collapsed, and due to the obstructing debris, officials were unable to contain it.
