= 1855 Des Plaines tornado =

1855 tornado in Illinois

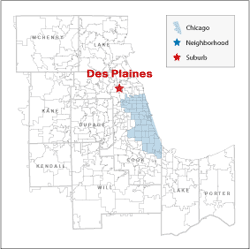
- Location of Des Plaines relative to the Chicago metropolitan area

Meteorological history
- Date: May 22, 1855

FU tornado
- on the Fujita scale

Overall effects
- Fatalities: 4
- Injuries: 8
- Areas affected: Cook County, Illinois

On May 22, 1855, a significant and deadly tornado moved through the Chicago suburbs of Mount Prospect and Des Plaines, both located in the U.S. state of Illinois. The tornado was the first ever recorded in Illinois and killed at least four people, all on the same property.

== Tornado summary ==
The tornado first touched down near present-day North Fairview Avenue, moving to the southeast. The tornado damaged the John Roney property (present-day U.S. Route 14) where it was sighted lifting a wagon and horses; at this location it made a slight turn east. After traveling parallel to U.S. Route 14 it began to pivot southward, where William Thacker saw the tornado approach his location. At around 4:00 pm the tornado struck the Page-Wheeler property, where four occupants were killed and eight others were injured. The house itself was shifted off its foundation and completely destroyed; the tornado lifted a short distance to the south of the property. In addition, furniture on the property was carried upward by the tornado. It was on the ground for an estimated 5.2 miles (8.4 km).

== Studies and aftermath ==
The Chicago Tribune wrote that "the scene of the tragedy is still before our mind's eyes".

List of fatalities attributed to the tornado
Name	Age
Samantha Finch	N/A
Harriet Paige	N/A
Eveline Wheeler	0
Lillian Wheeler	3

== See also ==
- Tornadoes in Chicago
