= 1999 Manenberg tornado =

Tornado that hit Cape Town, South Africa in 1999

Meteorological history
- Formed: c. 4:00 a.m. (UTC); August 29, 1999
- Dissipated: August 29, 1999

F1 tornado
- on the Fujita scale
- Highest winds: 150 km/h (93 mph)

Overall effects
- Fatalities: 5
- Injuries: 200+
- Areas affected: Manenberg, Gugulethu and Nyanga suburbs of Cape Town, South Africa
- Part of the tornado outbreaks of 1999

The 1999 Manenberg tornado was a rare tornado that occurred in the Cape Town neighborhood of Manenberg, South Africa killing five people on the night of 29 August 1999. The tornado was the result of a storm that swept through a one kilometre path through the city, starting on the Atlantic seaboard and moving east. First over Devil's Peak, then on through the neighborhoods of Mowbray, Claremont, Manenberg, Surrey Estate, Guguletu, ending at Mitchells Plain. The storm reached its peak strength over Maneberg.

Wind speeds were recorded reaching over 150 km per hour. The tornado killed five people and injured an additional 220. Over 5,000 residents were left homeless with 40 flats being "totally gutted" and a total of 825 homes being destroyed, effecting 2,800 families. The storm caused additional damage to the nearby community of Gugulethu and Nyanga where roughly 2,000 people were left homeless.

R1 million (roughly equivalent to R2.6 million in 2017) was allocated by City of Cape Town's disaster relief fund for rebuilding.

== See also ==
- List of tornado outbreaks
