= 1968 Black Forest tornado =

1968 tornado in Pforzheim, Germany

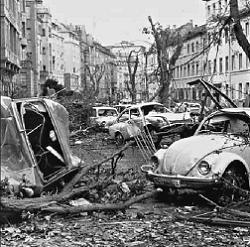
- Damage to vehicles and buildings in Pforzheim.

Meteorological history
- Formed: July 10, 1968, 21:30 p.m. CET (UTC+01:00)
- Dissipated: July 10, 1968, 21:50 p.m. CET (UTC+01:00)
- Duration: 20 Minutes

F4 tornado
- on the Fujita scale
- Highest winds: 207–260 mph (333–418 km/h)

Overall effects
- Fatalities: 2
- Injuries: 130
- Areas affected: Pforzheim, Neubärental and Ottenhausen

The 1968 Black Forest tornado, also called "Pforzheimer Tornado", was a powerful and long-lived F4 tornado that damaged about 3700 buildings in Pforzheim and the surrounding municipalities in Germany. In Neubärental 70 out of 115 buildings were severely damaged. There were two fatalities in Ottenhausen, west of Pforzheim and over 200 injured in Pforzheim. In the subsequent weeks an additional 130 people were injured and a roofer died during the clean-up and reconstruction. The tornado produced 130 million DM in damage. With inflation this amounts to a damage of €282 million as of 2023. The large cost is explained by a more densely populated area in southern Germany, when compared to the tornado alley in the USA.

Other even stronger tornadoes are known in Europe, but most do not hit an urban area as large as Pforzheim and the surrounding municipalities.

== Weather and tornado formation ==
On 9 July in northern France a high-pressure area formed which moved to the east of West Germany. On 10 July a low-pressure area formed over Portugal and Northwest Spain. This low-pressure area moved over Biscay, Spain on the morning of 10 July and it moved quickly towards the north-east. While it moved towards the east, on the eastern part of the low-pressure area, warm and moist subtropical air arrived from the Mediterranean Sea. This air spread to the south and middle of Germany. This caused high temperatures in the south of Germany (e.g. Karlsruhe 30.6 °C on 10 July), but low temperatures in the north of Germany (North Sea area 15 °C on 10 July). Meanwhile, on the north-western side of the low-pressure area cold and dry air from the northern polar region moved to the south. During the day the cold dry air moved westwards over France and Germany and moved into the warm and moist air, which had accumulated south-east of the low-pressure area. This caused strong thunderstorms, associated with hail, strong rain and wind gusts. One of this thunderstorm produced two tornadoes, while the storm front crossed from France into Germany on the evening of 10 July. The low-pressure area arrived over northern Germany on 11 July.

Similar weather situations commonly cause heavy thunderstorms over Pforzheim, with one producing another tornado: On 13 August 1953, another tornado caused significant damage in a part of Pforzheim. The website tornadoliste shows 2 confirmed (1953 and 1968), 1 plausible (5 June 2022, 2 min tornado) and 3 possible (1903, 2003, 2016) tornadoes for Pforzheim.

== Path of the tornadoes ==
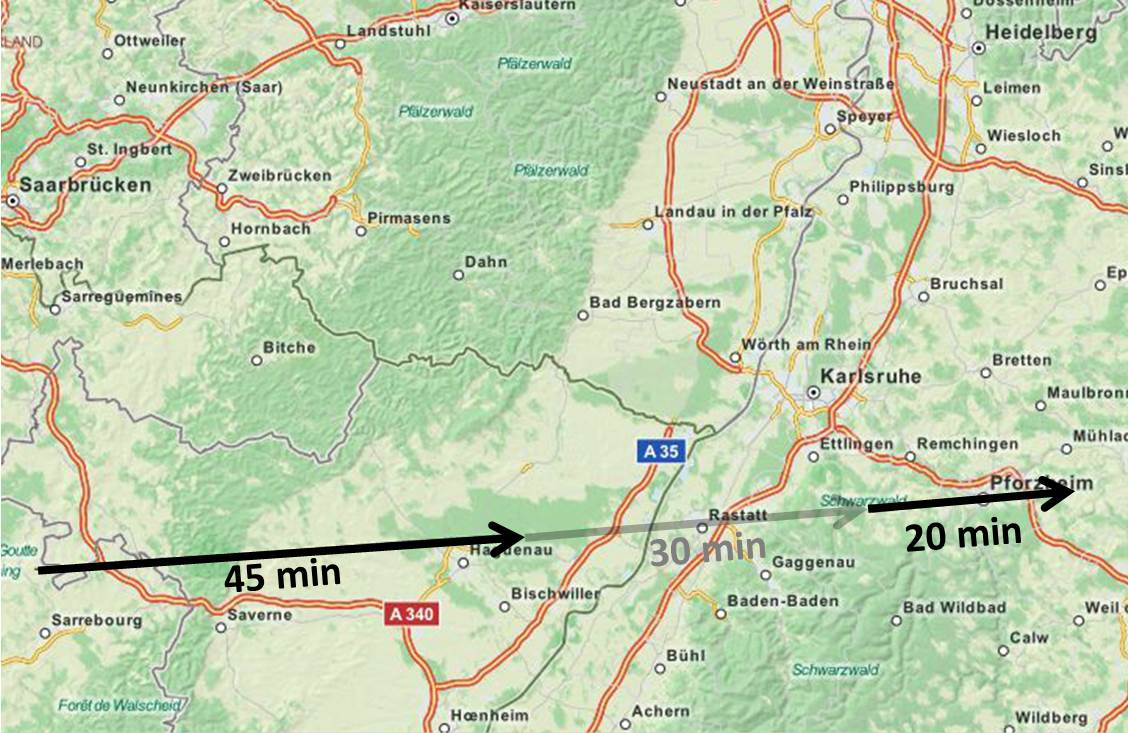
Path of the two tornadoes

The first tornado formed in France between 20:15 and 21:00 MEZ and had a path length of 60 km. It showed a path from Hilbesheim, moving near Veschheim and Weiler Oberdorf. It then moved between Neuweiler and Griesbach and was detectable behind Obermodern. After crossing the mountain range Voges it dissipated in France.

After a pause of 35 km the second tornado formed. This second tornado formed at 21:30 MEZ between Malsch-Sulzbach and Ettlingen-Oberweier. The funnel did not have any contact with the ground at this time. On the front of the storm eyewitnesses reported a wall cloud from which the funnel protruded. The first spotty forest damage were discovered about 20 km west of Pforzheim between the villages Schöllbronn and Burbach. This first damage consists out of trees with broken branches. The tornado reached the industrial area of Karlsbad-Ittersbach at 21:37 MEZ. The tornado strengthens while it crossed the Pfinztal, causing heavy damage to the forest. It then moved through the following municipalities and towns: Ottenhausen (northern part Rudmersbach), Gräfenhausen, Birkenfeld, south of the city Pforzheim. From Pforzheim it traveled further east and created a path in the Hagenschieß-forest, crossed the Autobahn and arrived at the settlement Neubärental. It traveled in between Wurmberg and Wiernsheim and finally dissipated on the hill "Hupfer", 13 km east of Pforzheim.

The tornado path of the second tornado had a width of up to 500–600 meters.

== Damages ==
=== Damages of the first F3 tornado ===
The first F3 caused mainly damage to the forests on its 60 km path.

=== Damages of the second F4 tornado ===
The tornado destroyed 300 ha of forest, which caused significant damage to the economy for some communities. Ittersbach for example lost 50% of its forest. The tornado also uprooted fruit trees. In Gräfenhausen and Oberhausen almost all cherry trees were uprooted. Grain fields were also devastated. Before the tornado reached Pforzheim it caused heavy damage in the municipality Ottenhausen in the northern part, called Rudmersbach. There it destroyed 6 buildings and damaged 50. The couple Frieda (57) and Emil (58) Nittel were killed while tornado moved through Ottenhausen. After the tornado moved through Pforzheim it hit the settlement Neubärental and caused heavy damage, damaging 70 out of 115 buildings.

==== Damages in Pforzheim ====
The damage path is about 500–600 meters wide and is located in the south of the city Pforzheim. The damage affected the following parts: Sonnenberg, Waldwiesen, Dillstein, Rodviertel, Südstadt, Waldsiedlung, Buckenberg, Alt-Heidach and Hagenschießsiedlung. The tornado damaged 2350 buildings of which 600 received heavy damage and 600 medium damage, the rest is light damage. Cars were lifted up by the tornado and moved up to 200 meters. Some buildings had their outer wall removed, making them look like dollhouses. The most common damage was seen on the roof of buildings. About 300 people were injured and nobody was killed in Pforzheim. The city park was devastated. The Kleinbahn towards Pforzheim received heavy damage and was never rebuild.

== Days and weeks after the tornado ==
At 1:50 a.m. MEZ the mayor of Pforzheim, Will Weigelt, declared a "Katastrophenalarm" (engl.: disaster alarm). Former mayor Albert Klein became the head of operations. The destroyed urban areas were visited by the minister president of Baden-Württemberg, Hans Filbinger. Filbinger promised aid to the region. The city administration asked for blood donations. Daily 6000 meals were prepared by a large canteen, the Red Cross and the city hospital.

The desaster relief was carried out by On-Call Police, the fire brigade, Technisches Hilfswerk, Red Cross, civil defence and the in Buckenberg stationed French 3^{e} régiment de hussards. Later German Bundeswehr soldiers and US army units were added as relief workers. Up to 3000 relief workers were active.

In Buckenberg the tornado caused the collapse of the roof of a sport hall. The trapped people were rescued after hours. After the rescue of trapped and injured people, the most important roads were cleared of debry. Next damaged buildings were secured. Via radio, television and newspaper roofers, glaziers, tinsmiths and carpenters were asked for help. 1200 roofs had to be covered.

Power, water and natural gas supply restoration in Pforzheim was more difficult. Over 1000 homes were initially without power. The western power lines were heavily damaged and only an eastern power line was initially funktional. At the time the full restoration of power was estimated to take one year.

On the Sunday (14th) the streets were filled with onlookers that sometimes even arrived with buses. These made the reconstruction difficult and the city of Pforzheim had to close the entire city for incoming traffic.

== Consequences ==
At the time no severe weather warnings concerning tornadoes existed in Germany. Local weather warnings existed for thunderstorms and strong wind gusts. But Pforzheim and the surrounding area was hit without a warning. Today the Deutscher Wetterdienst releases tornado warnings up to 18 hours before a tornado outbreak.

The language also changed in Germany. While weak tornadoes are called "Wirbelsturm" in Germany, strong tornadoes are called "Tornado" since the Pforzheim Tornado.

== Gallery ==
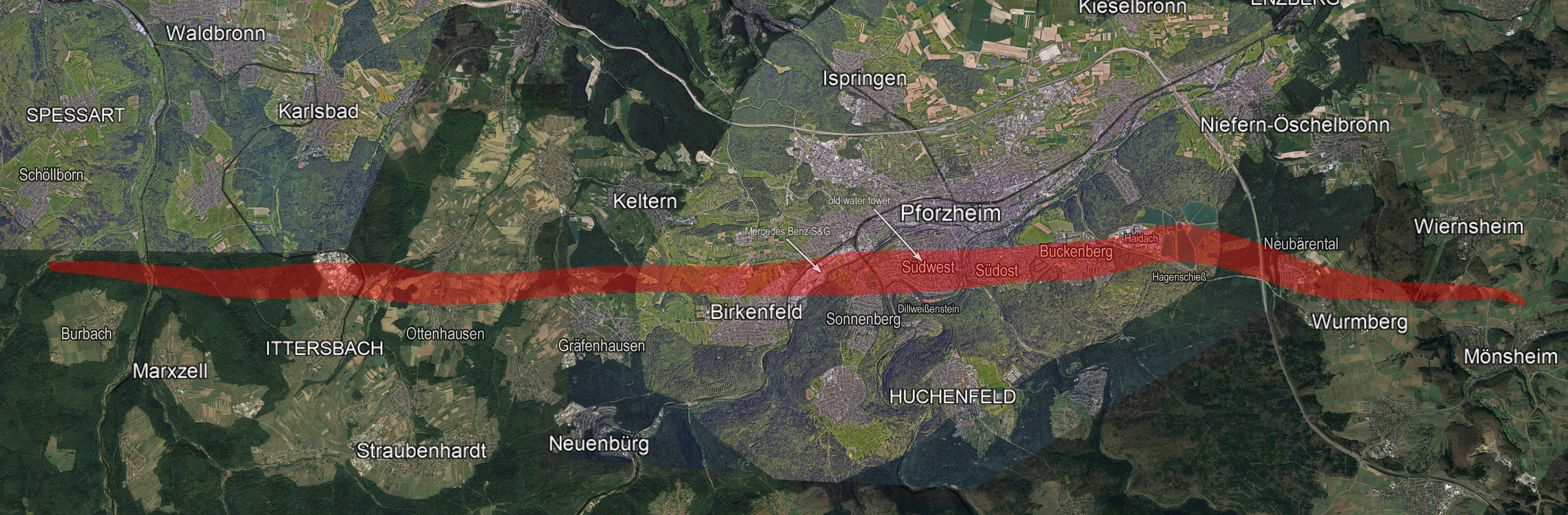
Path of the tornado over Pforzheim.

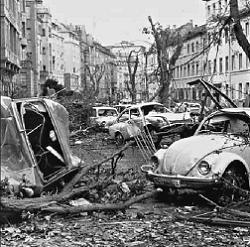
Damage in Pforzheim

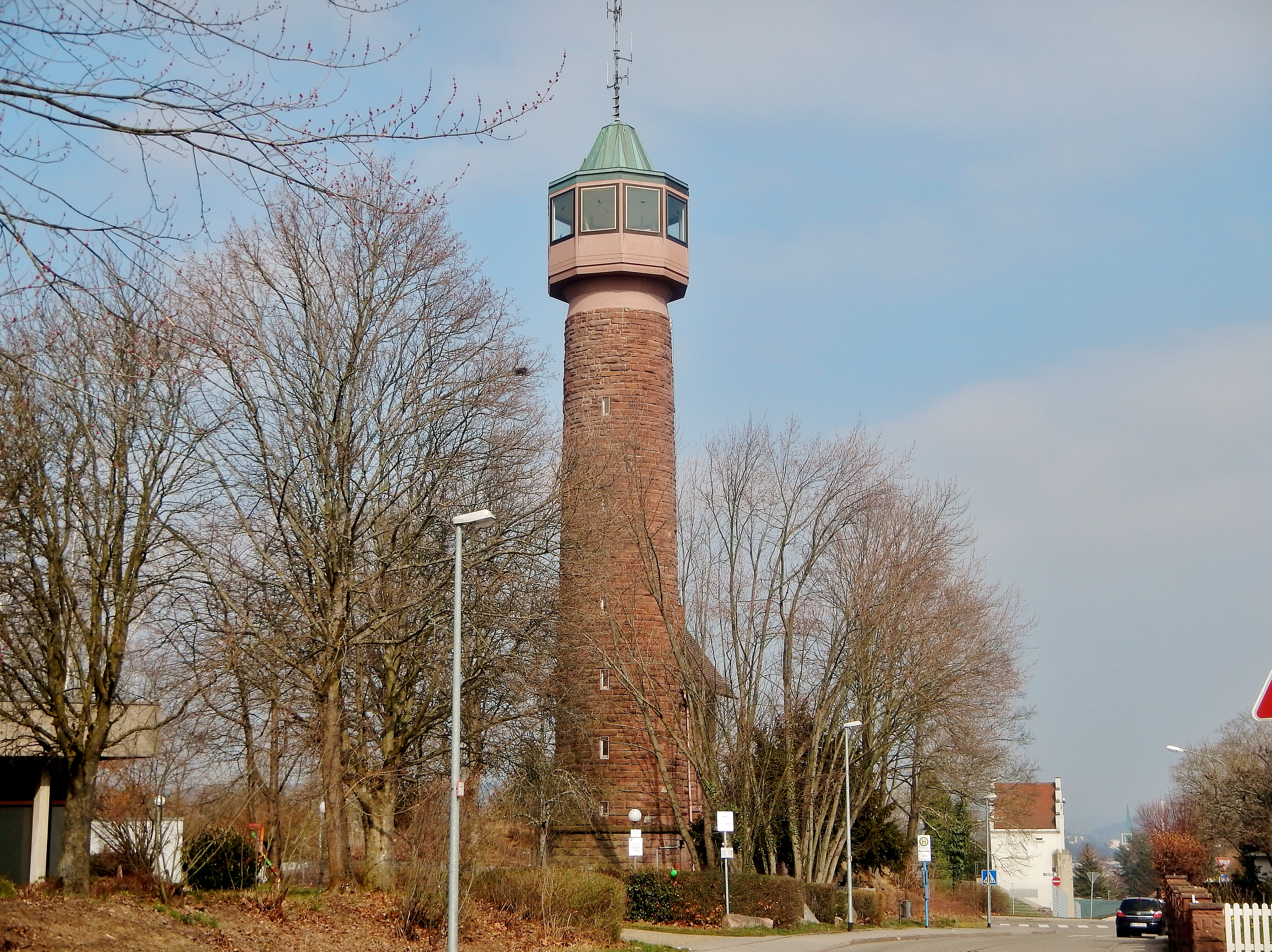
The old water tower in the southwestern ward of Pforzheim had its old observation deck removed by the tornado. The old deck was replaced by a new observation deck.

== See also ==
- List of European tornadoes and tornado outbreaks
- Pforzheim
