= Monitor =

Monitor or monitor may refer to:

== Places ==
- Monitor, Alberta
- Monitor, Indiana, town in the United States
- Monitor, Kentucky
- Monitor, Oregon, unincorporated community in the United States
- Monitor, Washington
- Monitor, Logan County, West Virginia
- Monitor, Monroe County, West Virginia
- Loope, California, formerly Monitor

== Arts, entertainment, and media ==
=== Fictional characters ===
- Monitor (Mar Novu), a DC comics character
- Monitors (DC Comics), a group of fictional comic book characters, who appear in books published by DC Comics

=== Periodicals ===
- Monitor (magazine), a weekly newsmagazine published in Podgorica, Montenegro
- Monitor (Polish newspaper), an 18th-century Polish newspaper
- Concord Monitor, a daily newspaper in New Hampshire, United States
- The Monitor (Sydney), a biweekly newspaper published between 1826 and 1841
- Daily Monitor, a Ugandan newspaper
- The Christian Science Monitor, an international news organization founded in 1908, that publishes self-titled periodicals
- Monitor, a magazine of the Victorian Herpetological Society in Victoria, Australia, formerly edited by Raymond Hoser

=== Broadcasting ===
- Monitor (radio program), an American radio program which aired on NBC radio from 1955 to 1975
- Monitor (British TV programme), a BBC arts programme which aired from 1958 to 1965
- Monitor (American TV program), a 1983–1984 American newsmagazine television program that aired on NBC

=== Music ===
- Monitor, a Czech record label sold to EMI Czech Republic in 1994
- Monitor (band), an American punk rock band
- Monitor, a 2006 album by Volován
  - "Monitor", the title song, also covered by Ximena Sariñana for her album Mediocre

=== Other uses in arts, entertainment, and media ===
- Monitor (film), a 2026 American horror film
- Monitor, a 1975 work by English video artist Stephen Partridge

== Brands and enterprises ==
- Monitor, a trade name for Methamidophos, a phosphorus based pesticide
- Monitor Deloitte, a management consulting firm

== Computing and technology ==
- Monitor (synchronization), an approach to synchronize two or more computer tasks that use a shared resource
- Computer monitor, an output device that displays information in pictorial form
- In-ear monitors, earpieces for performers on stage or in a studio
- Machine code monitor, program allowing users to view or change memory locations on a computer
- Resident monitor, an early primitive operating system
- Stage monitors, loudspeakers for performers on stage
- Studio monitor, professional grade loudspeaker designed specifically for audio production and engineering
- System monitor, a hardware or software component used to monitor system resources and performance in a computer system
- Virtual machine monitor, or hypervisor, is a software that creates and runs virtual machines, allowing multiple operating system images to run simultaneously on a single piece of hardware
- Firefox Monitor, email monitoring application (see Firefox version history)

== Healthcare ==
- Monitor (NHS), a former regulator for health services in England
- Monitor, a person who performs self-monitoring
- Clinical monitor or clinical research associate, a health-care professional who works in monitoring of clinical trials

== Ships ==
- Monitor (warship), a heavily armed warship design preceding the battleship, named for the USS Monitor
- Breastwork monitor, a type of turret ship with a raised superstructure and higher freeboard than the first monitors
- List of breastwork monitors of the Royal Navy
- List of Russian and Soviet monitors
- River monitor, a type of warship designed for fighting on inland waterways
- USS Monitor, a shallow-draught turret ship of the United States Navy

== Water jets ==
- Monitor, a pressurised water jet used in hydraulic mining
- Fire monitor, a water jet used for firefighting

== Other meanings ==
- Battle of the Monitor and Merrimack, 1862 battle of the American Civil War
- Monitor (architecture), a subsidiary roof structure
- Hall monitor, a student who supervises the corridors of a school
- Monitor lizard, any lizard of the family Varanidae (once believed to warn of crocodile attacks)
- Saint Monitor, bishop of Orléans

== See also ==
- Monitoring (disambiguation)
- The Monitor (disambiguation)
- The Monitors (disambiguation)
- Moniteur (disambiguation)
