= VIVA! Art Action =

Performance art festival in Montreal, Quebec

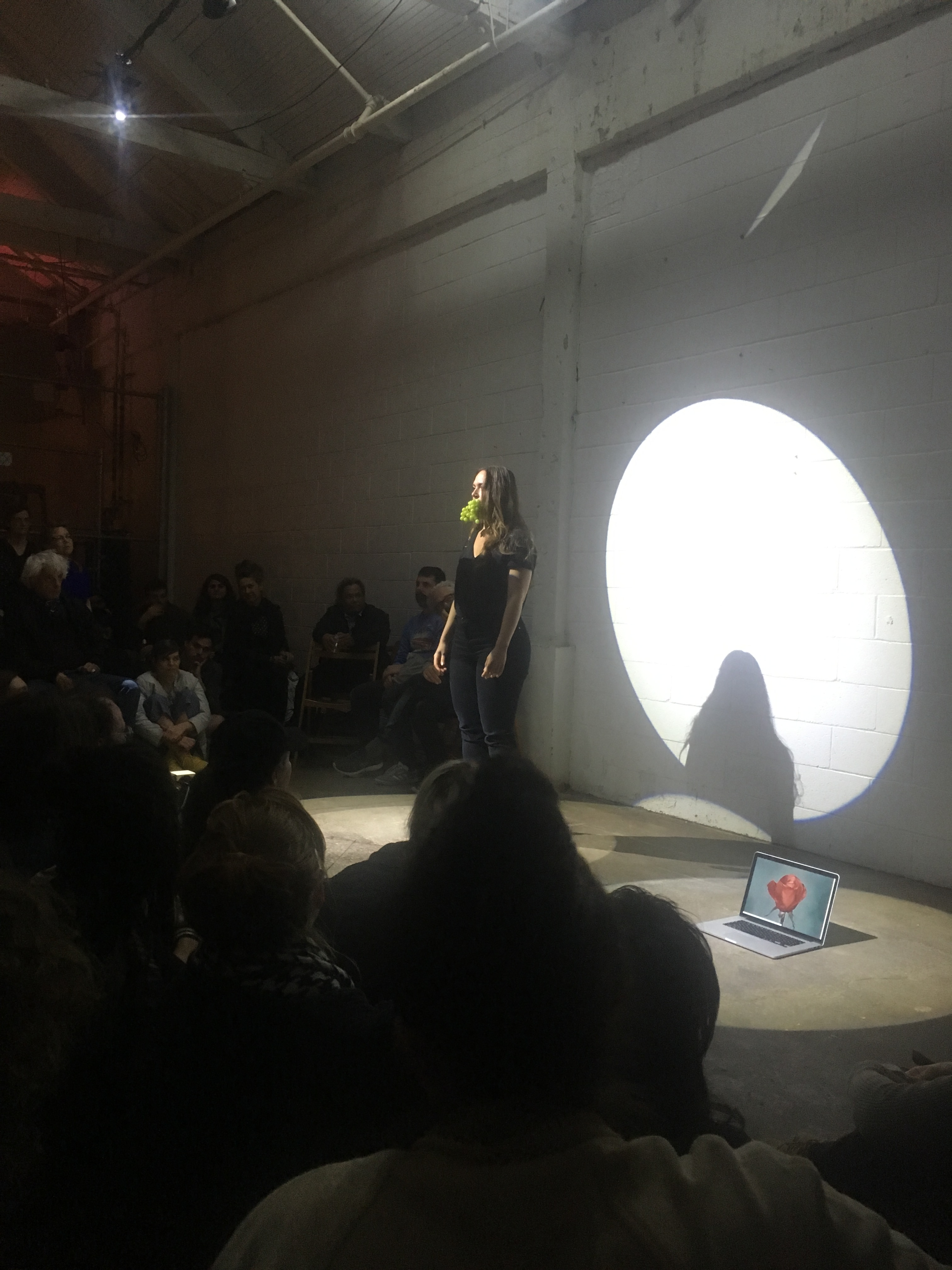
- Formation: 2006
- Type: Performance Art Festival
- Director: Michelle Lacombe
- Website: https://vivamontreal.org/

VIVA! Art Action is a biennial performance art festival based in Montreal, Quebec. It was founded in 2006 by Alexis Bellavance and Patrick Lacasse in collaboration with six different artist-run centres in the city. The festival usually spans over the course of a few days, during which performances, discussions, installations, and shared meals take place.

The next edition is programmed for October 7–11, 2025 at L'Union Française, in Downtown Montreal.

== Mandate ==
Viva! aligns itself with practices of performance, art action, body art, happenings, and more. The festival's mandate prioritizes experimentation, encouraging artists to take risks and challenge their practice. The festival usually showcases projects that are relational, durational, ephemeral, or infiltration based, amongst others.

== Partnerships and funding ==
In 2006, the artist-run centers involved in the establishment of VIVA! were Centre SKOL, Centre Clark, Articule, Dare-Dare, La Centrale, and Praxis. As the festival found its organizational structure throughout the years, different forms of collaboration have emerged. VIVA! now stands as its own collective, not simply a joint effort between centres. However, Montreal's art centres are still involved in supporting the event. In 2023, the organizations listed as supporting the festival included Centre Clark, Dare-Dare, Oboro, and Le Lieu.

The festival receives funding from the Canada Council for the Arts, Conseil des Arts et Lettres du Quebec, Conseil des Arts de Montréal, and the City of Montreal, amongst others. Community fundraising also contributes to the continuation of the events, namely through off-season events and donations during the festival.

== Location ==
From 2006 to 2013, VIVA! took place at the Bain Saint Michel, located in Montreal's Mile End neighbourhood. This building housed a historic bathhouse, inside of which an empty swimming pool acted as a stage.

In 2015, the festival moved to Ateliers Jean-Brillant, in the Saint-Henri neighbourhood. Programming stayed there until 2019, at which point the COVID-19 pandemic affected operations for a couple of years and interrupted the planned 2021 edition.

Resuming in 2023, VIVA! took place at l'Union Française, a cultural center located in Downtown Montreal.

== VIVA! Kitchen ==
Throughout the festival, meals are offered in a convivial manner, to be shared amongst artists, organizers, volunteers and the public. In every edition since 2006, a different artist or collective has run the kitchen as a part of their artistic practice. The project is offered as a type of art residency adjacent to the festival.

Select Past Projects
2011	SP38 aimed to create a moment for sharing and interacting with one another, exploring the imagery of the family dinner table.
2017	Sonja Zlatanova & Andreja Dugandžić presented VIVA's first collaborative kitchen project. Their work explored hybridization and the inversion of the private space of the kitchen, primarily reserved for women.
2019	The invited artist, David Sébastien Lopez Restrepo, was denied a visa for entry into Canada. His project was completed at a distance and explored themes of migration, translation and technological mediation.
2023	Diyar Mayil explored the theme of giving through action.

== Past programming ==
Edition	Invited Artists	Other Events
2006	Sylvie Tourangeau, Genevieve Crepeau and Matthieu Dumont, Peter Grzybowski, Non Grata, ARAI Shin-Ichi, Sandra Schafer and Phil Fryer, SP 38, Rino Cote, Yoyo Yogasmana, Mederic Boudreault, Rachel Echenberg, Flutura and Besnik Haxhillari, Lilian Frei and Darja Unold, Rubens, Edwige Mandrou and Nicolas Primat, Margaret Dragu, Claudia Frommel, Theodor Di Ricco, Sean Smith and Ernest Truely, Bryce Kaufmann, Yan Duyvendak, Maria Cosmes, Willem Wilhelmus, Sylvette Babin, Julie-Andrée T., Jorge Hidalgo, Jill McDermid, Amy Klement.	SoToDo International Performance Art Congress.
2009	Invited by DareDare: Katnira Bello, Carl Bouchard and Martin Dufrasne, Christian Bujold, Sophie Castonguay and Anne-Marie Ouellet, Adonis Flores, Marianela Orozco, Raul Naranjo.; Invited by Centre SKOL: Joshua Schwebel, Jennifer Bélanger, Irene Izquierdo, Birte Endrejat.; Invited by La Centrale: Dayna Mcleod and Alexis O'Hara, Dominique Petrin, Lilibeth Cuenca Rasmussen, Gwendoline Robin, Flutura and Besnik Haxhillari.; Invited by Praxis Art Actuel: Rodolphe-Yves Lapointe, Thierry Marceau.	
2011	Invited by DareDare: Nadège Grebmeier-Forget, Marie-Suzanne Désilets.; Invited by Centre SKOL: Marc Giloux, Martine Viale, Andres Galeano.; Invited by La Centrale: Alice de Visscher, Noémi McComber, Yurie Ido, Rachel Echenberg, Marie Claude Bouthillier.	Tableau Noir.; Lunchtime discussions animated by Berlin Performer Stammtisch.
2013	Anne Parisien and Christian Bujold, Bartolomé Ferrando and Basil AlZeri, Belinda Campbell, Brad Butler and Karen Mirza, Camila Vasquez, Carlos Martiel, Celeste Marie Welch, Chelsea Knight, Claude Wittmann, Contrary Collective, Csenge Kolozsvàri, Étienne Boulanger, Helena Martin Franco, Hugo Gaudet-Dion and Véronique Guitar, Jean-Baptiste Farkas and Jean-Sébastien Vague, Justene Williams, Kineret Haya Max, Macarena Perich Rosas, Marie-Claude Gendron, Marlène Renaud-B., Paul Maheke, Robin Brass, SP 38, Steven Cohen.	Tableau Noir
2015	Arkadi Lavoie Lachapelle, Arti Grabowski, Boryana Rossa, Dana Michel, Danny Goudreault, Dorothea Rust, Doyon/Demers, Emilie Monnet, Francys Chenier, Jacqueline Van de Greer, Jason Lim, Jean-Philippe Luckhurst-Cartier, John Court, k.g. Guttman, Marilyn Arsem, Sandra Johnston, Soufia Bensaid, Sylvie Cotton, Victoria Gray.	Le débat 2015 des candidats de Papineau.; Conference: Quel Performatif générons-nous?; Discussion: Site, context, action.; Exposition: Somewhere Else.; Conference: Art is Facing Fire.
2017	John G. Boehme, Ianna Book, Kimura Byol-Nathalie Lemoine, Sarah Chouinard Poirier, Roberto de la Torre, Adriana Disman, Andreja Dugandžić, Keyon Gaskin, Steve Giasson, Nadia Granados, Johanna Householder, Ursula Johnson, Mathieu Lacroix, Catherine Lavoie-Marcus, Hélène Lefebvre, Didier Morelli, François Morelli, JP Mot, Sandrine Schaefer, Adrian Stimson, Mégane Voghell, Sonja Zlatanova, Marina Barsy Janer x Isil Sol Vil.	Emerging Action Art Critics’ Contest.; Artexte launch: More Caught in the Act and Le 7e sens
2019	Alastair MacLennan, Alejandro Sajgalik, Cindy Baker, Clayton Windatt, David Sebastian Lopez Restrepo, Emma-Kate Guimond, Guadalupe Martinez, Hugo Nadeau, Ignacio Pérez Pérez, Kamissa Ma Koïta, Kris Grey and Rajni Shah, Lauryn Mannigel, Liina Kuittinen, Maria Evelia Marmolejo, Marita Bullmann, Miao Jiaxin, Mikiki, Nezaket Ekici, Rosamond S. King, Seiji Shimoda, Simon Brown, WWKA.	auto-workshops.
2023	Anguezomo Mba Bikoro, Catherine Boivin, Denys Blacker, Diyar Mayil, Gui B.B, Gustavo Solar, Jelili Atiku, Kamil Guenatri, Louise Liliefeldt, Mai Bach-Ngoc Nguyen, Martín Rodríguez, Mathieu Beauséjour, Paola Martínez Fiterre, Rose de la Riva, seth cardinal dodginghorse, stvn girard, Tanya Mars, Wathiq Gzar Al-Ameri, Winnie Superhova and Nien-Tzu Weng.	
