= Monitor speaker =

Monitor speaker may refer to:

- Loudspeakers built into a computer monitor
- Stage monitor system, loudspeakers facing the stage during a live performance
- Studio monitor, professional grade loudspeaker designed specifically for audio production and engineering

== See also ==
- Monitor (disambiguation)
