= Louise Liliefeldt =

South African-Canadian artist

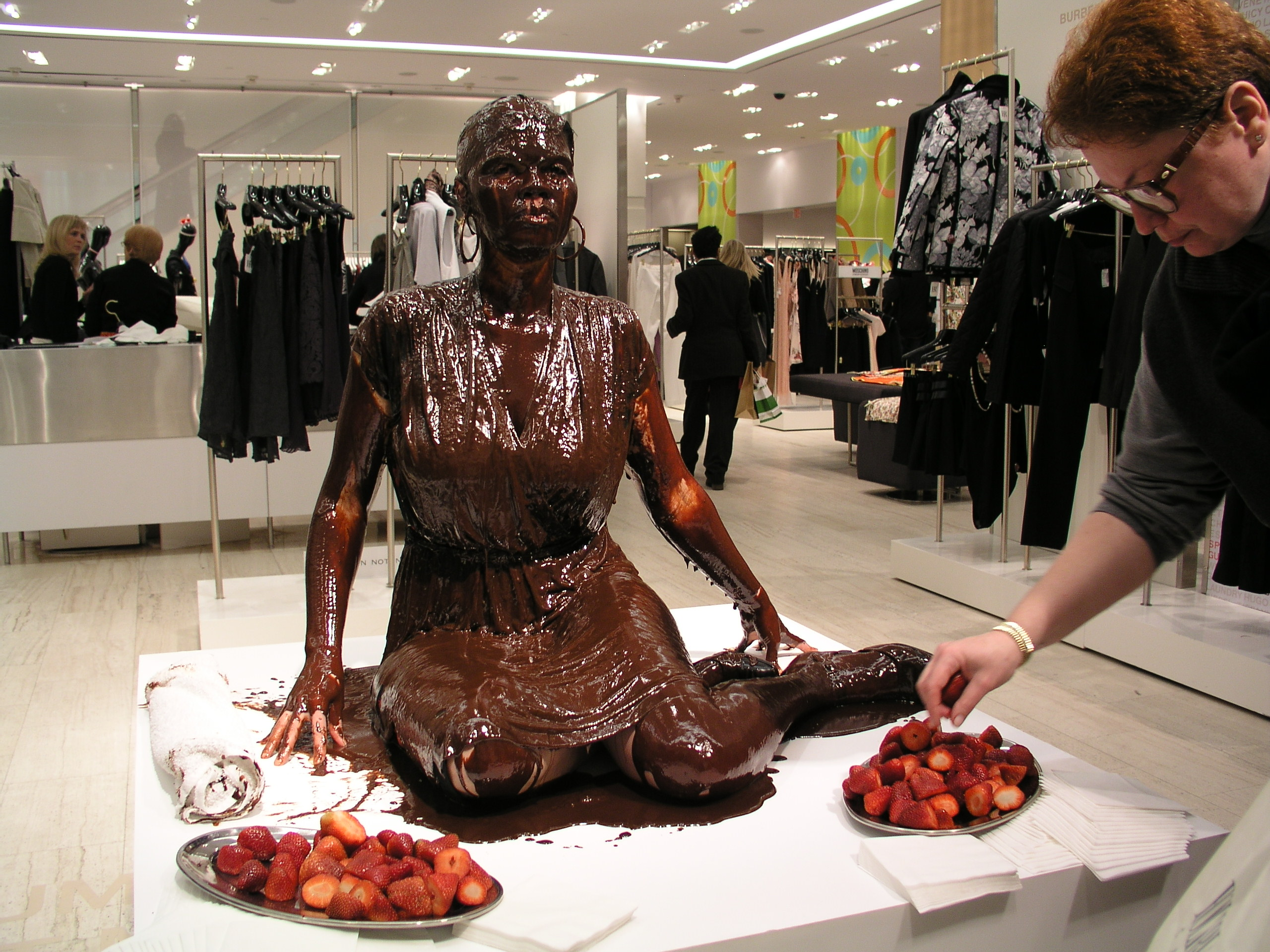
- "Lekker III" created and performed by Louise Liliefeldt
- Born: 1968 (age 57–58); Cape Town, South Africa
- Education: OCADU
- Occupations: performance artist, visual artist
- Website: louiseliliefeldt.com

Louise Liliefeldt is a Canadian artist primarily working in performance and painting. She was born in South Africa and currently lives and works in Toronto, Canada. Liliefeldt’s artistic practice draws directly from her lived experience and is apparent in the use of symbol, colour and material in her work. Other influences include Italian, Latin and Eastern European horror films, surrealism and African cinema. Taken as a whole, Liliefeldt’s work is an embodied investigation of the culture and politics of identity, as influenced by collective issues such as gender, race and class. Her performance work has developed through many prolific and specific periods.

== Background and education ==
Liliefeldt was born in Cape Town, South Africa in 1968 and came to Canada when she was six years old. Her family heritage is a mix of African, English, Zulu, and Dutch. She attended the Ontario College of Art (now OCAD University) from 1987 to 1992.

In the early 90s, Liliefeldt was a member of the Shakewell Performance Art collective and a frequent volunteer at Symptom Hall, a space directed by Jenny Keith and run by a small volunteer group of artists in Toronto. As a member of Shakewell, she organized workshops and many performance art, music and multidisciplinary art events. Self-funded, Symptom Hall operated out of a former Lithuanian community centre on Claremont Street from 1993 to 1998.

From 1993 to 1999 Liliefeldt was the Distribution Manager at Vtape and she also spent two years with the Canadian Filmmakers’ Distribution Centre as the Tour Coordinator for their 35th Anniversary National Tour in 2002. She was a member of the programming committee and Board of Directors of Pleasure Dome, an artist-run presentation organization and publisher dedicated to experimental media from 2002–2004. She is a co-founding member of the Toronto Performance Art Collective (TPAC) which was established in 1996 and presents the biennial 7a*11d International Festival of Performance Art in Toronto, Canada. Louise was active on the collective from 1996–2008.

== Performance work ==
Through the late 1990s and early 2000s, Liliefeldt’s work was often described as "iconographic portraits,” and was exemplified by its forays into tableaux vivant and long duration, sometimes holding a single pose for hours on end. Using visceral materials in carefully constructed immersive environments or in public and site-specific contexts, Liliefeldt’s intention was to push the extremes of the human body through labour and endurance (for example, carrying very heavy or large objects). Liliefeldt’s performance work has been widely presented in Toronto and across Canada by artist-run centres, galleries, museums, festivals and independent curators and programmers including: 7a*11d International Festival of Performance Art, Art Gallery of Ontario (AGO), Art Gallery of York University (AGYU), FADO Performance Art Centre, Images Festival, Mayworks Festival of Working People and The Arts, Mercer Union (Toronto); The Western Front (Vancouver); and Rencontre Internationale Performance D’art (Québec City), among others. Her work has also been presented in the US, Turkey, Poland (the 7th Castle of Imagination International Festival of Performance Art) and Wales (trace: Installaction Artscape, a performance space run and curated by renowned Irish performance artist Andre Stitt between 2000–2008). In 2016, curator Wanda Nanibush commissioned Liliefeldt to create a new performance in the context of the exhibition Toronto: Tributes + Tributaries: 1971–1989, a survey exhibition at the AGO. With her work, What Does It Mean To Forget, Liliefeldt returned to performance-making after a 5-year hiatus caring for her aging father. Since then, her performance work has focused on the fragility of the human experience investigating aging, dementia and death.

== Collaborations ==
Liliefeldt has performed with and made appearances in the performances, films and videos of many Canadian artists. She has appeared in the films and videos of Kika Thorne (Year Book, 1998); Christina Zeidler (Soul Sucka, 1995, Galaxy Girls, 1995 and Dog Days, 1999) and she was the star of Wasaga by Judith Doyle (1994), performing alongside Tracy Wright and Daniel MacIvor, which premiered at the Toronto International Film Festival in 1994. Liliefeldt’s video, Hamartia, a collaboration with Michael Caines, screened at the Images Festival in Toronto in 2001. She has appeared in and voiced dialogue in several films by Mike Hoolboom, including In the Dark (2008).

She appeared in Rita McKeough’s In bocca al lupo—In the mouth of the wolf, in Halifax in 1993. In the early 2000s she performed extensively with Istvan Kantor’s Machine Sex Action Group including Axiome (Montreal, 2001) and Office (Québec City, 2001). She has also collaborated with and performed in the works of Shannon Cochrane and Tanya Mars.

She collaborated with Midi Onodera on Alphagirls in 2002. Alphagirls is a collection of three cyber performances by Kinga Araya, Louise Liliefeldt and Tanya Mars. The theme of the DVD examines advancing technologies within a feminist framework. In collaboration with each artist, Midi Onodera has directed and designed each performance with unique interactive possibilities.

== Notable performances ==
- Under (1999). 7th Castle of Imagination Performance Art Festival. Poland.
- Ethel: Bloodline (2000). Public Spaces / Private Places (series). Curated by Paul Couillard. Presented by FADO Performance Art Centre. Toronto, Canada.
- Weeping Body (2002). Roadworks Performance festival and Exhibitions. Presented by Mercer Union. Toronto, Canada
- CAGE (2003). trace: Installation Artspace. Cardiff, Wales. Curated by Andre Stitt.
- Untitled III (2003). What It Feels Like For A Girl (exhibition + catalogue). Art Gallery of York University. Curated by Philip Monk. Toronto, Canada.
- Egalitarian (2005). Co-presented by FADO Performance Art Centre. Toronto, Canada.
- Kitchen Dutch (part 1 & 2)(2012). Ceremonial Actions (exhibition). York Quay Gallery, Harbourfront Centre. Presented by FADO Performance Art Centre, co-presented by Images Festival. Curated by Shannon Cochrane. Toronto, Canada.
- What Does It Mean To Forget? (2016). Presented in the context of the exhibition, Toronto: Tributes + Tributaries 1971–1989. Art Gallery of Ontario (AGO). Curated by Wanda Nanibush. Toronto, Canada.
- Still In There (2017). VIVO Media Arts Centre. LIVE Biennale. Vancouver, Canada.
- SPECIES (2018). 7a*11d International Festival of Performance Art. Curated by Toronto Performance Art Collective. Toronto, Canada.
- Path (2019). KinesTHESES (series). Presented by Toronto Performance Art Collective (7a*11d). Curated by Paul Couillard.

== Publications ==
- Promise: A Collection of Performance-Based Video and Film Dedicated to Different States of Becoming. Edited by Deirdre Logue.
- CounterPoses: Re-concevoir le tableau vivant = CounterPoses: Re-imagining Tableaux Vivants. Edited by Jennifer Fisher and Jim Drobnick (Display Cult).
- CFMDC: The Independent Short Film in Canada 1967–2002. Edited by Roberto Ariganello, Chris Kennedy, Louise Liliefeldt, Deirdre Logue, Karen Sandlos.
- What It Feels Like for a Girl. Exhibition catalogue. Edited by Philip Monk.
- More Caught in the Act: an anthology of performance art by Canadian women. Edited by Johanna Householder and Tanya Mars. YYZ Artists Outlet (Toronto).
- Toronto Tributes and Tributaries 1971–1989. Edited by Wanda Nanibush. AGO, Toronto
- Une bibliographie commentée en temps réel: l'art de la performance au Québec et au Canada = An Annotated Bibliography in Real Time: Performance Art in Quebec and Canada. Edited by Barbara Clausen, Jade Boivin, Emmanuelle Choquette. Artexte, Montréal.
- The Rhubarb Festival Book Edited by Clayton Lee. Buddies in Bad Times Theatre. Toronto, 2021.
