= Lynn Hughes (artist) =

Canadian artist and academic (born 1951)

- Born: Snelgrove; 1951 (age 74–75); Vancouver
- Education: University of Toronto (M.A. History and Philosophy of Science and Technology, and B.A. Literature); Vancouver School of Art (B.F.A.)
- Notable work: Annunciation for William James, 1982 (painting) — Marlène Frigon et son équation favourite + peinture dérivée de celle-ci, 1985 (mixed media) — Perversely Interactive System, 2004(digital interactive) — Propinquity, 2009-2010 (digital interactive)

Lynn Hughes Lynn Hughes (born 1951) is a Canadian artist, professor, organizer, researcher and curator. In the nineteen-eighties, she was a prominent figure in the “new figuration” movement in Canadian painting. She taught and held administrative positions starting in 1989 in the Fine Arts Department at Concordia University, where she received the 2012 Concordia University Academic Leadership Award. Since 2000, she has been involved as a researcher, creator and advocate of new media and experimental games, holding the Research Chair in Interaction Design and Games Innovation at C.U. (2014-2018). Hughes played an instrumental role in the funding and structuring of the Hexagram Institute for Research-Creation in Media Arts and Technologies (Hexagram), and the Technoculture, Art and Games (TAG) research centre. She has co-curated numerous exhibitions, notably “Joue le jeu/Play Along” (2012), a major exhibition of innovative interactive games at La Gaîté lyrique in Paris.

== Early Years ==
Lynn Hughes (Snelgrove) was born in 1951 in Vancouver, Canada. During an itinerant childhood she was raised principally in Zambia (c.1953-61), often living on the road on extended “holidays” through Central Africa and Europe. At 10 years old she moved to Madrid, Spain (1961-63) and then spent her teen years in Formby, Lancashire, England (1963-69).

== Studies ==
Hughes’ initial university studies were in English literature and philosophy, beginning a degree at the University of Liverpool (1969-71) and completing her B.A. at the University of Toronto (1971-72), where she was awarded the Governor General’s Silver Medal for English. Subsequently she moved to Paris, France, to pursue independent studies in painting and at the École des Beaux-Arts, and in ceramics at the École des Arts Appliqués (1972-73). Returning to Canada she completed a B.F.A. at Vancouver School of Art (now named Emily Carr University of Art and Design) (1973-76), graduating with honors in ceramics. She returned to the University of Toronto in 1986, where she received a Masters degree in the History and Philosophy of Science and Technology, with a concentration in the History and Philosophy of Mathematics (1989).

== Artist Career ==
=== Early Work ===
Lynn Hughes first established her reputation in Canada as a ceramicist. For her solo graduate show “Rank Beginning” at the Vancouver Art Gallery (1976), she presented a raku pottery installation. By 1979, she had moved away from ceramics, exhibiting the text based installation Life After Art Theory at the “20 x 20 Italia/Canada” exhibition in Milan, Italy, alongside Canadian artists such as Bill Vazan, Sorel Cohen and Suzy Lake.

=== Painting ===
In the early 1980s, Hughes developed a neo-expressionist painting practice in Montréal. She became a representative of Canada’s “new expressionism” group of painters, also known as the “new figuration” movement, which included fellow Montréal artists David Elliot, Michael Joliffe, Luc Béland and Suzelle Levasseur. Her early solo shows in Canadian artist-run centres include: “Lynn Hughes: Pictures of Things” at Mercer Union in Toronto (1980) and “Lynn Hughes: It's Only Fascination" at Optica in Montréal (1980). She was included in the Musée d'art contemporain de Montréal’s 1985 group exhibition “Peinture au Québec: une nouvelle génération”, with artists such as Michel Daigneault and Pierre Dorion. In the nineteen eighties Hughes was represented by Grünwald Gallery in Toronto, where she exhibited in 1982 and 1985, and later in 1990 (exhibition “Pure + Applied’).

By 1982, Hughes produced The Suspects, a widely exhibited and commented upon series of portraits of important figures from literature and philosophy such as William James (coll. National Gallery of Canada), Henry Miller, Pier Paolo Pasolini and Jean Genet. Diana Nemiroff, critic and future curator at the National Gallery of Canada, wrote that these works push “against the limit of what we are willing to accept as art… [and] define the character of the new figuration as a painting of desires made manifest.” Hughes continued painting large expressionist canvases into the mid to late eighties. In her 1986 exhibition “Suzuki Soup”, scientific instruments and mathematical formulas enter into her dense collage of eclectic imagery. That same year, motivated by her desire to see her art embedded in a larger social context, Hughes shifted her focus away from the studio and began a Master’s degree at University of Toronto in the history and philosophy of science and technology.

Upon completion of her studies in the history of science, Hughes returned to painting combining these two interests in a series of works entitled The Project on Women + Mathematics (1993), also known as Tentative Equations. The works were portraits of women mathematicians, each an assemblage with three parts: a full body, near life-size, black-and-white photograph of a Montreal mathematician; her favourite mathematical formula painted directly on the gallery wall; and Hughes’ interpretation of the formula in an abstract painting. The series first showed in Canadian artist-run centres (New Gallery, Calgary, 1993; Oboro, Montreal, 1995) and later at the Art Gallery of Ontario, Toronto (1996). Critics were to note the interplay between literal photographic studies and abstraction, and between the intellectualisation of painting and the aestheticisation of mathematical workings, as well as Hughes’ disruption of traditional binaries, such as reason/intuition, male/female as well as science/art.

This series was an attempt to connect with a wider audience beyond what Hughes considered the closed world of contemporary painting. At the end of the nineties, she left painting, gravitating towards more contemporary digital technologies.

=== Interactive Works ===
In the late 1990s and early 2000s, Lynn Hughes brought interactivity into her visual art practice. This move was motivated by changes in society that she considered affected “what art means.” These changes had to do with the ubiquity of new technologies of connectivity, the importance that video games had acquired at that time and a consideration of the significance of play in contemporary culture. From this starting point, she created a series of installations and immersive environments that employed physical interfaces, working collaboratively with interdisciplinary teams that included artists, programmers, engineers and game designers. By 2023, Hughes is considered a pioneer in digital art, and was actively encouraging alternatives to the limited range of mainstream games that often depend on violence. She instead promoted creative approaches that do not sideline ethical considerations.

Hughes’ most widely exhibited and frequently cited work is Perversely Interactive System (2004). The interactive, digital-video/sound installation was produced with Simon Laroche. It uses a wireless biofeedback handset, which is held by the user and measures their stress levels, as well as a video projection of a female figure initially with her back to the user. Small changes in the user’s sweat gland activity are detected and affect the behaviour of the virtual figure. As the user is able to relax, the avatar turns around and moves towards them.

Perversely Interactive System was widely exhibited. It had its debut in 2004 in the group show “Interstices 4 x 5 à 7” at Dare Dare artist-run centre in Montréal and was shown the same year at FILE 2004 the Festival Internacional De Linguagem Eletrônica in São Paulo, Brazil. It was featured with the works of AE, Alexandre Castonguay, beewoo, Brad Todd and Jean Dubois in the seminal group show “À l’intérieur/Inside”, curated by Sylvie Parent and produced by Groupe Molior, which was presented at: the Third Beijing International New Media Arts Exhibition and Symposium, Millenium Museum, Beijing, 2006; and Paço das Artes art centre in São Paulo, Brazil, in 2008. Other notable exhibitions include: ELEKTRA 2005 festival of digital arts in Montreal (curator: Alain Thibault) and the 2006 group show, “Can We Fall in Love With a Machine?” at Wood Street Galleries in Pittsburgh PA.

Hughes’ subsequent collaborations focused on ludic games that did not use screens, including the works Cubid (2005-2006), Fabulous/Fabuleux (2007-2008) and Alt Ego (2018).

Other works in this series include Propinquity (2009-2010), an interactive work developed in collaboration with expert in game studies Bart Simon, with additional tech support from Jane Tingley, Anouk Wipprecht and Marius Kintel, who are a trio of designers, hackers and sculptors working together as The Modern Nomads (aka MoNo). Propinquity was a full-body digital game, with elements of both combat and dance. Two players face off in a circumscribed ring of light and attempt to close in on each other’s sensor-fitted bodies. Proximity, without physical contact, results in scoring. Sound and biofeedback enhance gameplay, and the experience is described as social as well as physical.

Propinquity was selected for IndieCade (International Festival for Independent Games) in Los Angeles, Come Out & Play San Francisco and BostonFIGS (Festival for Indie Games) in 2013, and the Montréal International Games Summit (2012). It was also included in the Quebec Focus program at Elektra X BEAF (Bozar Electronic Festival) in 2013.

Hughes' 2017 piece, Place des Alts was a commissioned work for the KM3 public art event commemorating the 375th anniversary of Montreal presented in the downtown's Quartier des spectacles. Lynn Hughes led the production team, which included TAG associates, including multimedia artist and filmmaker Gina Hara and a group of PhD students. Place des Alts took the form of an audio- and photo-based cellphone application, and a peripatetic puzzle heralded in the public space by two interactive sculptural elements: a one-meter high red cube and a fluffy tentacle-like protuberance. Visitors to the commemorative installation were challenged to complete narrative-driven visual puzzles by distinguishing between fake news and historic events. In this work local histories, real and imagined, became material.

=== Collections ===
Lynn Hughes paintings and drawings are held in permanent collections at the Canada Council Art Bank (six works 1979-1985), the National Gallery of Canada (8 works 1983-1991), the Musée d’art contemporain de Montréal (5 works 1984-1991), along with other public collections and various private collections.

== Academic career ==
=== Teaching and Academic Positions ===
Lynn Hughes taught painting and drawing in several universities including The University of Regina (1985-86) and Concordia University (1989-1994), and was a professor in the Intermedia program in Studio Arts at Concordia (1999-2017).

Hughes held several administrative positions while at Concordia including Associate Dean positions in the Faculty of Fine Arts (1989-94; 2006-2007; 2008-2011) and later took on the position of interim Associate Vice President of Research (2016-2017). She held the position of Concordia Research Chair in Interaction Design and Games Innovation (2014-2018). She retired in 2017 and is Professor Emerita.

=== Research Groups, Collectives and Infrastructure ===
In 2000, Lynn Hughes and Jean Dubois (professor at the École des arts visuels et médiatiques of the Université du Québec à Montréal (UQÀM)), co-founded Interstices, an inter-university research group in media arts. Interstices received funding from the Fonds de recherche du Québec (FQRSC), and was one of the first university research groups funded to promote both research and artistic creation; until then, artist-researchers were predominantly excluded from important university research funding programs.

Interstices members explored aesthetic and poetic human-machine interfaces that engaged viewers through means other than the keyboard and mouse interfaces, notably through touch, movement and metabolism. Interstices provided them with funding and mentorship. The group enabled students and faculty from Concordia to collaborate and co-create with peers from the francophone Université du Québec à Montréal (UQAM) and vice versa. Hughes and Dubois co-directed Interstices until 2010. During their tenure, Interstices worked with students and faculty to produce many ambitious interactive works that appeared in more than 35 exhibitions in Canada and internationally. Their inaugural exhibition “4 x 5 à 7 : présentations de prototypes” was held at Dare Dare artist-run centre in Montréal in 2004. A full-colour, hardcover catalogue, with essays by Hughes and Dubois, was produced for the group’s 2008 event “Coefficients d’intimité / Amplified Intimacies” at OBORO in Montreal.

In 2001, Hughes was instrumental in the conception, structuring and financing of Hexagram, a Montreal Institute for research and creation in media arts and technologies. Significant funding for Hexagram came from Valorisation-Recherche-Québec (VRQ) and the Canada Foundation for Innovation (CFI), resulting from a grant co-written by Hughes and Barbara Layne. The project received over 21 million dollars, from which 8 million was used to build a research space in Concordia’s arts/engineering complex and 1.5 million to UQAM to build an interactive explorations center. Through this investment a platform and research-technology infrastructure for new media arts was created at Concordia University in partnership with UQAM and Université de Montréal. In 2008, with the end of VRQ funding, the Hexagram Institute merged with Le Centre interuniversitaire des arts médiatiques (CIAM) and continued its activities.

In 2008, Lynn Hughes and Bart Simon, Professor, Sociology and Anthropology at Concordia University founded the Technoculture Art and Games (TAG) research centre. TAG is one of Canada’s largest and most-established games research centers, and is recognized as Canada's first university-based centre in the field. It brings together collaborators from different disciplines in the university (e.g. English, Communications, Education, Sociology, Computer Science), as well as in the community, to do research in digital gaming and to design games.

In 2016, Hughes and Simon, along with Professor of Design and Computation Arts Christopher Salter, founded the Milieux Institute for Arts, Culture and Technology at Concordia University. Milieux came about due to the increased number of students and departments expressing a common set of interests across the fine arts, digital culture and information technologies. Built on the Hexigram infrastructure, Milieux provides a platform for research, creative experimentation, interdisciplinary training and social engagement. TAG became one of seven interdisciplinary Clusters at Milieux.

=== Distinctions ===
In 2013, Lynn Hughes received the Concordia University Academic Leadership Award. “Dominic Peltier-Rivest, director of the Centre for Academic Leadership, praised her for ‘guiding the [Fine Arts ] faculty toward increased research capacity and a fuller articulation of fine arts to the research mission of Concordia.’”

In 2018 Lynn Hughes was among the recipients of the 5th World Omosiroi Awards in Japan, which showcases people from around the world “whose pioneering activities and ideas epitomize OMOSIROI (fun and interesting)”.

== Curating ==
Lynn Hughes has demonstrated an ongoing interest in bringing artworks by other artists to the public, throughout all the phases of her career.

Her first curatorial project, in 1983, demonstrated a connection between the Montréal and Toronto art scenes. “Trois artistes de Toronto/Three Toronto Artists: Alan Glicksman, Brian Scott, Robert Youds” was exhibited at the Articule artist-run-centre in Montréal. The show also included works by three other Toronto artists selected by Toronto co-curator Bruce Russell. In 1994, she co-curated with New Yorker Carol Williams, another visual art exhibition entitled “Langues, torsions et nœuds : Ana Chang, Catherine Heard, Vita Plume & Angela Somerset”, which brought together four feminist artists from across Canada at La Centrale artist-run centre in Montréal.

In 2008, Hughes’ curatorial interests turned to electronic works. Hughes believed that gaming was central to her cultural context and wanted to support artists and other independent creators interested in producing games, as a counter point to often formulaic commercial games.

That year, she co-curated with Jean Dubois “Interstices : Coefficients d’intimité” at Oboro artist-run-centre in Montréal. The month-long exhibition presented a selection of works by twelve members of the Interstices electronic arts research group (Matthew Biederman, Jean Dubois and Chloé Lefebvre, Karmen Franinovic, Ying Gao, Adad Hannah and Niklas Roy, Lynn Hughes and Heather Kelley with Geoffrey Jones, James Partaik, François Quévillon).

In 2011, she presented a selection of international innovative games created by small studios and individuals at La Gaïté Lyrique, a venue dedicated to presenting and creating digital arts in Paris, France. The selection of work entitled “Carte blanche à Kokoromi et TAG” was part of the NÉMO (Le festival arts numériqued d’arcadi). Hughes represented TAG research centre and was accompanied by co-curators Heather Kelley from the Kokoromi Collective and Cindy Poremba from TAG and Kokoromi. The following year, the trio returned to La Gaïté Lyrique to curate “Joue le jeux”, a monumental, two-month long event that presented twelve experimental games, including five “giant” games, games played with a traditional controller, games that are physical and social, experimental games and games that are close to theatre. The museum-scale exhibition occupied five floors of La Gaïté Lyrique.

In 2015, Hughes was part of a curatorial team (with Carolyn Jong, Ida Marie Toft and Skot Deeming) that presented a selection of interactive works entitled “MUESTRA: Resistencia en jugeo/Resistance at play” as part of the event Cambios Compartidos: Transitio_MX06 at the Centro Nationale de las Artes in Mexico City. The works were created by TAG research group members, and were selected for their thematic connections to the politics of protest, power and control, surveillance and witnessing.

In 2022-2023, an exhibition curated by Hughes and Nathalie Bachand entitled “Intangible In-Between/Intengible entre-deux” was shown at: Sporobole in Sherbrooke, Quebec; ELEKTRA and Perte de signal in Montréal; and Centre Bang in Chicoutimi, Québec. It brought together works by six artists from Canada, South Korea, Brazil and Columbia who combined experimental games and art.

In 2025, Lynn Hughes and Richy Srirachanikorn produced the ambitious “Ludodrome: a gathering of 40 experimental game makers”, a one-day event at Montréal’s Société des arts technologiques (SAT), which presented an arcade of forty experimental games created using artistic, innovative and critical approaches.

In 2023, she co-curated with Nathalie Bachand “Art and/or play: symbiosis or dissonance?”, a program of experimental video games and related artistic practices by French and Canadian creators (Disnovation.org, Ahreum Lee, Enric Llagostera, Raphaëll Maïwen, Santiago Tamayo Soler, Tatiana Vilela Dos Santos). The program was presented at the Canadian Cultural Centre in Paris, as part of the 28th edition of the annual International Symposium on Electronic Art (ISEA)(2023).

== Publications ==
Among other publications, Lynn Hughes co-authored with Jean Dubois CI/AI: Coefficients d'intimité / Amplified Intimacies, which gives a theoretical framework for, and catalogues a major exhibition of interactive works by the research group Interstices (2015). She has co-edited two collections of essays: Creative Con/Fusions: Interdisciplinary Practices in Contemporary Art/Penser l’indiscipline: Recherches Interdisciplinaires en art contemporain with Josée Lafortune, which looks at interdisciplinary theory and practice in contemporary art (2001); and ART X GAME = / JEU X ART = with Nathalie Bachand, which considers the conjunctures between art and gaming (2022).

In 2024, Lynn Hughes self published an illustrated collection of her poetry entitled Knot All of This is Nice (42 pages).
