= The Monitors =

The Monitors can refer to:

- The Monitors (film), a 1969 satirical science fiction film
- The Monitors (comics), fictional characters created by DC Comics
- The Monitors (American band), a Motown act from the 1960s
- The Monitors (Australian band), an Australian band from the early 1980s

== See also ==
- Monitor (disambiguation)
- The Monitor (disambiguation)
- Monitoring (disambiguation)
