= Wises Landing, Kentucky =

Hamlet in Trimble County, Kentucky

Wises Landing
- hamlet
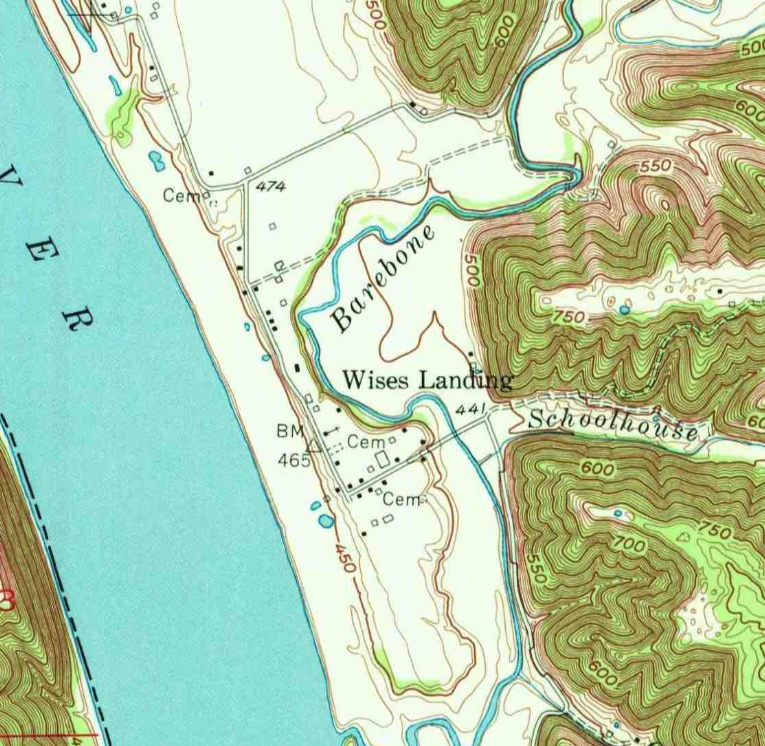
- Wises Landing on the 1953 Bethlehem, Indiana 1:24000 topographic map

- Location within the state of Kentucky Wises Landing (the United States)
- Coordinates: 38°34′23″N 85°24′30″W
- Country: United States
- State: Kentucky
- County: Trimble
- Elevation: 446 ft (136 m)
- Time zone: UTC-5 (Eastern (EST))
  - Summer (DST): UTC-4 (EDT)

Wises Landing (also known as Wise's Landing and Wise Landing) is a hamlet located in Trimble County, Kentucky, United States. It is at the mouth of Barebone Creek, two miles from Corn Creek creek, at the headwaters of which is Corn Creek Church.

In the 19th century, it was a thriving port town for traffic inland into Trimble via the creeks. The community was served by the Corn Creek post office and was damaged in the 1937 Ohio River flood. In 1974, the Louisville Gas & Electric Company selected the area for the construction of a new power plant, which was completed in 1990. The Yeager General Store, which was listed on the National Register of Historic Places in 1983, is located in Wises Landing.

== Geography and history ==
Barebone Creek alongside Corn Creek (the actual creek, not the post office) is one of the handful of major watercourses in Trimble County (others being Middle, Patton, and Spring creeks). Wise's Landing hamlet is at Barebone Creek's mouth on the Ohio River and Kentucky Route 1488. Corn Creek (the creek) is actually 2 miles to the north of the Landing.

The first Corn Creek post office was actually on the creek, in the vicinity of Corn Creek Church at the creek headwaters in between the towns of Milton and Bedford. It operated from January 6, 1830, to the middle of November 1849 under postmaster Jesse Connell. However, the location of the majority of the community of Corn Creek, comprising several businesses and a mill, was at the creek mouth in the middle 19th and early 20th century.

The Landing, a busy river port in the 19th century that dwindled into a hamlet in the 20th, was apparently first known as Fix's Landing after Henry Philip Fix, a stockgrower and farmer from Indiana who established it and opened his store there in 1845, and who may have been one of the first settlers in the area. In 1876, the area was named after either Jesse Wise, who purchased land from Fix, or after Jesse's forebear William Wise who was a veteran of the American Revolutionary War. In turn, Wise sold his store at the site in 1878 to Richard Ogden. Although the Landing name does not appear on contemporary maps, it was Wise's Landing, rather than Corn Creek, (the creek) that was the location of the next Corn Creek post office when it was opened at Ogden's store on June 21, 1878. The Corn Creek post office at Wise's Landing remained in operation until 1912 or 1913. It did not receive its first postmaster, Gertrude Ogden, until January 1879.

It is not known why Ogden chose to name the post office Corn Creek after the creek a few miles away rather than Wise's Landing where it actually was; nor is the reason for Corn Creek, the creek's own name, known. There was a George Corn who lived in the area and died in 1832, with children recorded as living in (then designated) Henry County (now Trimble), and there is also a record of a "Corn's Old Farm" in the Act of the Kentucky General Assembly that established Trimble and set its county bundaries, so it is possible that the creek was named for a local family.

A flood hit the landing in the early 1880s. In 1920, about 200 people lived at Wises Landing. The 1937 Ohio River flood washed all but two of the buildings located in the lower portion of the town off of their foundations. The Yeager General Store, which was built in 1911 and is located in Wise's Landing, was listed on the National Register of Historic Places in 1983. At one time, the community had two churches.

A road from United States Highway 42 at Bedford to Wises Landing was authorized by the Kentucky General Assembly in 1932. Transport inland from the Landing had in the 18th and 19th century involved travelling up the rugged creek beds of the Barebone and Corn creeks.

== Environs ==
To the north of Corn Creek creek, across Rodgers Ridge, lies Payne Hollow, famed as the 20th century home of husband and wife Harlan and Anna Wonder Hubbard that they built on previously abandoned farmhouses and fields. It is not accessible inland by vehicle, only by footpath down from the ridges; or by boat from Lee's Landing in Indiana across the Ohio River half a mile away. On the old packet ferry charts for the Ohio River it is recorded as 564.5 miles (908.5 km) below Pittsburgh.

Between the mouths of Corn Creek (creek) and Payne Hollow is Preston Hollow, once the location of Preston Plantation, a 3,300 acres (1,300 ha) tract originally part of an 8,000 acres (3,200 ha) Norfolk Farm, owned by one John Howard and the home of his daughter and granddaughter Margaret Preston Howard and Mary Wickliffe Preston, the latter a friend of Delia Webster. It is 565.2 miles (909.6 km) below Pittsburgh.

The mouth of Spring Creek, another of the Trimble County waterways, is 563.2 miles (906.4 km) below Pittsburgh on the packet ferry charts.

The Pryors Fork tributary of Corn Creek (creek) was served by a post office named Trout after postmaster Lafayette Trout, from March 30, 1887, until the middle of June 1906. It was located at what by the 20th century was the junction of Kentucky Routes 625 and 1488.

== Power plant ==
In 1974, the Louisville Gas & Electric Company (LG&E) selected the Wise's Landing area for the site of its fourth power plant, across the river from the proposed site of the Marble Hill Nuclear Power Plant in Indiana. A 1976 newspaper article expected the plant to begin operations in 1981. Construction work at the site began in 1979, and involved clearing 1,000 acres (400 ha) and moving part of a road. The plant was opposed by several local groups. In 1984, the construction of the LG&E plant was stated to have altered the nature of the dwindling community. As of that year, it was believed that the plant would not be needed until 1987. The plant, known as the Trimble County Power Plant, finally opened in 1990.

The 1978 environmental impact report to the United States Environmental Protection Agency noted that the downstream portion of Corn Creek (the creek) near to its mouth had been channelized some time prior to 1950, leaving a disconnected oxbow lake where the creek used to run. The creek had to be further re-routed to accommodate disposal ponds (a fly ash and a scrubber sludge pond) as part of the plant construction, although the area around the oxbow was largely unaffected.

== Schools ==
The school at Wise's Landing was a frame building and did not separate students into different grades. It was known as the Totten School.

== Churches ==
The 1939 WPA Trimble County history records two churches for Wise's Landing, one "Baptist" and one "Christian". The Baptist church was Corn Creek Church, originally located in Gallatin county before part of it became Trimble County, between eight and nine miles north of Bedford near the headwaters of Corn Creek (the creek) after which it was named.

It was founded on October 13, 1800, by William Taylor and Joshua Morris, the eight charter members adopting the Philadelphia Confession of Faith with three reservations. In 1801 it united with the Salem Association, and John Taylor started preaching there in 1802. Its membership, having started out as 20, and having reached 50 when Taylor arrived, grew to 64 by 1803. It joined the Long Run Association that year, and the Sulphur Fork Association in 1826, the year after which it reported 125 members. From a height of 333 members in 1864, membership declined; the church splitting on race grounds in 1865, and several of the white members (who remained in the original church) then being transferred to a church named Locust in Carrol County, to reach only 98 members by 1879.

The church did not have an official pastor for its first 27 years, but rather its ministers where whatever preachers happened to be its members at the time. Taylor was the principal one from 1802 to 1815. Others included:

- Philemon Vawter, born in Culpepper County, Virginia somewhere around 1765, came to Corn Creek (the church) via Clear Creek Church in Woodford County, Bullitburg church in Boone County in 1796, arriving at Corn Creek in 1804. Having been ordained a deacon in 1797, and licensed to preach in 1800, he became ordained as a minister in the autumn of 1804. He had a brother, Jesse Vawter, who was also a Baptist minister, but who wasn not a preacher at Corn Creek Church.
- William Buckley, raised in Woodford County, Kentucky and who moved to Trimble County in 1816, was in effect John Taylor's successor after Taylor left. He was licensed to preach in 1805, and ordained some time within the next two years. He was not a popular preacher at Corn Creek Church, and moved on to the Union church in Livingston County in 1820.
- George Kendall, born and raised at Corn Creek, was Buckley's successor. He was ordained in 1827.
- Archer Smith, son of shoemaker and Georgia native William Smith, followed Kendall. Born in Union County, South Carolina on January 25, 1796, he was a first cousin of Baptist preacher Lewis D. Alexander of Owen County via his mother, sister of Travis Alexander. His parents brought him to Scott County, Kentucky in 1805. He moved to Owen County in January 1818 where he married Cynthia Conway. Ordained a deacon in 1830, he was licensed to preach in October 1831. He moved to Jefferson County, Indiana in March 1839, finally coming to Corn Creek Church in 1847, when he returned to LaGrange, Kentucky. He bought and moved to a farm near the church in 1853, and lived there until the death of his wife in 1868. He remarried in 1871 and died on January 5, 1873.

The "Christian" church was the Macedonia Christian Church, whose cemetery still exists in Wises Landing. Other cemeteries include the Fix Farm cemetery and the Richardson cemetery in Wises Landing; the Fisher cemetery on Barebone Creek; and the cemetery of the Corn Creek Baptist Church.

== Sources ==
=== Contemporary newspapers ===
- Fineman, Howard (February 25, 1976). "Trimble Residents to be Heard on New Power Plant". The Courier-Journal.
- Trout, Allan M. (October 24, 1953). "An Old Prof's Seen the Schools Improve Since His 3-R Days". The Courier-Journal.
- Colwell, Carolyn (January 11, 1979). "Work Begun at LG&E's New Plant Site". The Courier-Journal.
- Rutherford, Glenn (February 12, 1984). "An Un-Wise Move ... Power Plant Construction Altered Small Town's Nature". The Courier-Journal.
- Jeffries, Fran (January 13, 1992). "After 12 Years, LG&E Plant is Still on Hot Seat". The Courier-Journal.

=== Histories ===
- Scott, Clara (1987). "Wises Landing". nkyviews.com. Trimble County Banner.
- Rennick, Robert M. (2016). "Trimble County Place Names". Robert M. Rennick Manuscript Collection (128). Morehead State University.
- Rennick, Robert M. (1988). Kentucky Place Names. University Press of Kentucky. ISBN 9780813126319.
- Rennick, Robert M. (2000). "Trimble County — Post Offices". County Histories of Kentucky (300). Morehead State University.
- Works Progress Administration (1939). "Trimble County — General History". County Histories of Kentucky (301). Morehead State University.
- Perrin, William Henry; Battle, J. H.; Kniffin, G. C. (1887). Kentucky, a History of the State (reprinted ed.). Southern Historical Press. ISBN 9780893081386.
- Taylor, John (1995). "Corn Creek Church". In Young, Chester Raymond (ed.). Baptists on the American Frontier: A History of Ten Baptist Churches of which the Author Has Been Alternately a Member (reprinted ed.). Mercer University Press. ISBN 9780865544796.
- Spencer, John H. (1886). "Corn Creek Church". In Spencer, Burrilla B. (ed.). A History of Kentucky Baptists: From 1769 to 1885. Vol. 1. J. R. Baumes.
- McLaughlin, Phyllis Codling (2015). Trimble County. Arcadia Publishing. ISBN 9781467113625.
- Ryle, Russell G. (2000). Ohio River Images: Cincinnati to Louisville in the Packet Boat Era. Arcadia Publishing. ISBN 9780738507392.

=== Biographies and encyclopaedias ===
- Thomas, Bill (2014). "Hubbard, Anna Wonder". In Tenkotte, Paul A.; Claypool, James C. (eds.). The Encyclopedia of Northern Kentucky. University Press of Kentucky. ISBN 9780813159966.
- Thomas, Bill (2014). "Hubbard, Harlan". In Tenkotte, Paul A.; Claypool, James C. (eds.). The Encyclopedia of Northern Kentucky. University Press of Kentucky. ISBN 9780813159966.
- Cunningham, Mia (2014). Anna Hubbard: Out of the Shadows. University Press of Kentucky. ISBN 9780813149448.

=== Other ===
- Johnson, W. Gus (1982). "Yeager General Store". Kentucky Historic Resources Inventory. National Park Service.
- "Trimble County Generating Station Permit: Environmental Impact Statement". United States Environmental Protection Agency. 1978.
- "292". Acts Passed by the General Assembly for the Commonwealth of Kentucky. J. Bradford. 1932.
- Demaree, Nancy (May 1, 2000). Place, Disease and Mortality: Trimble County, Kentucky 1849–1894 (M.Sc. thesis). Western Kentucky University.
- "Wises Landing", Geographic Names Information System, United States Geological Survey, United States Department of the Interior
