= Providence, Kentucky (disambiguation) =

Providence, Kentucky is a town in Webster County, Kentucky.

Providence, Kentucky is also the name of:

- Providence, Simpson County, Kentucky
- Providence, Trimble County, Kentucky
