= Clinical monitoring =

Clinical monitoring may refer to:

- Monitoring (medicine), the observation of a disease, condition or one or several medical parameters over time
- Monitoring in clinical trials, oversight and administrative efforts that monitor a participant's health during a clinical trial

== See also ==
- Monitoring (disambiguation)
