= Yeager General Store =

- U.S. National Register of Historic Places
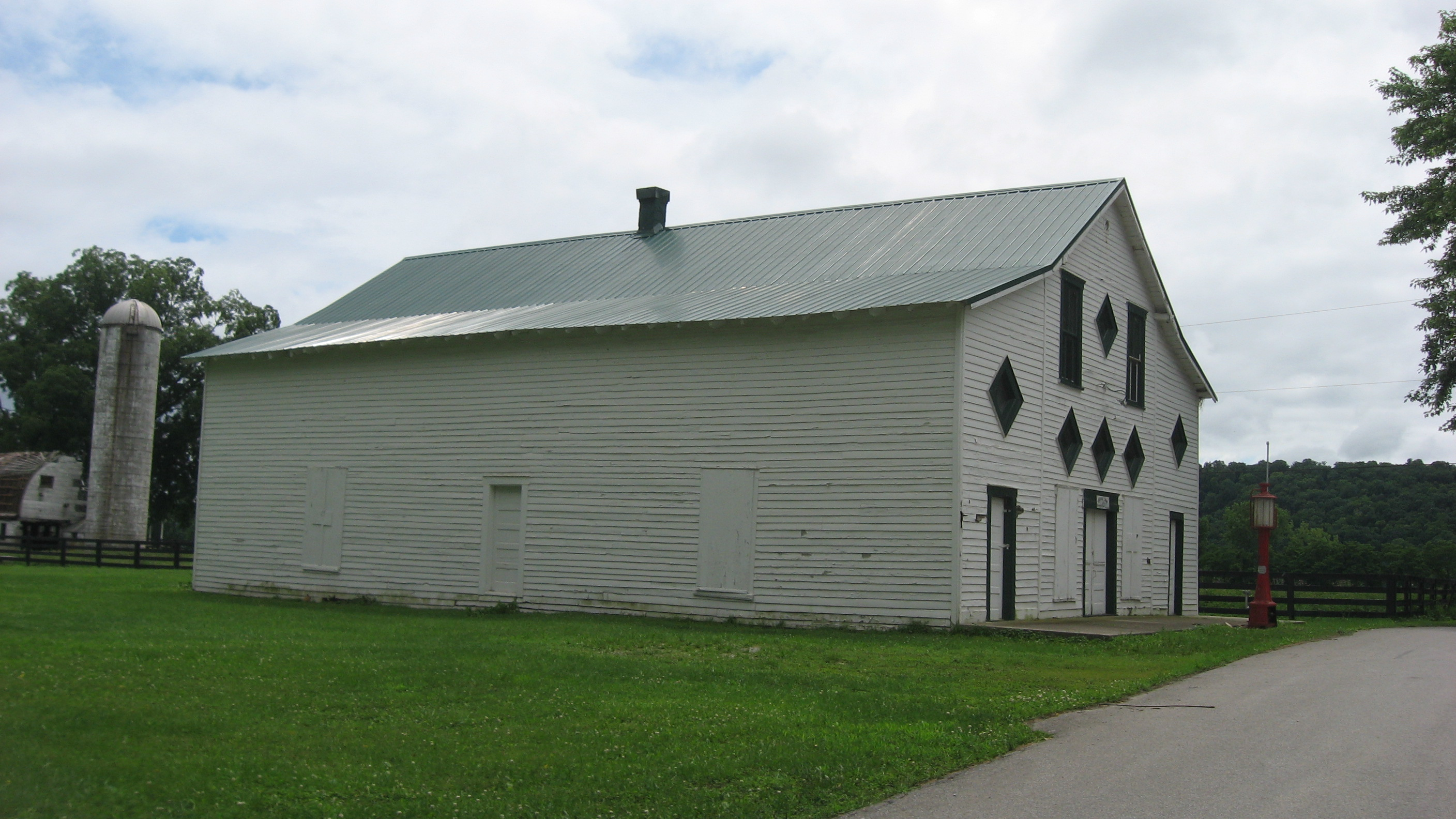

- Location within Kentucky Location within the United States
- Location: Barebone Rd, Wise's Landing, Kentucky
- Coordinates: 38°34′14″N 85°24′25″W
- Area: 0.3 acres (0.12 ha)
- Built: c.1911
- MPS: Trimble County MRA
- NRHP reference No.: 83004528
- Added to NRHP: July 21, 1983

The Yeager General Store, in Wise's Landing, Kentucky, was listed on the National Register of Historic Places in 1983.

It was built around 1911 and was the second general store built on the site.
