= Bullittsburg Baptist Church =

Historic church in Kentucky, United States

Coordinates: 39.09021322°N 84.7876364°W

Bullittsburg Baptist Church is located at 2616 Bullittsburg Church Road, Petersburg, Boone County, Kentucky. This Baptist Church was organized in June, 1794, by Elders John Taylor (1752-1833), Joseph Redding, and William Cave. The church erected the first house of worship in 1797. This is the oldest church in the northern region of Kentucky.

== History ==
On June 7–8, 1800, five baptisms at the original log-constructed Bullittsburg Baptist Church, led by Pastor John Taylor, were the earliest Kentucky salvations in the era that became known as America's Second Great Awakening. An ongoing wave of salvations among both free and enslaved men and women continued for months at this house of worship deep in the rustic frontier hills of extreme northern Kentucky. Beginning five days later, from June 13–17, 1800, during an open-air communion celebration led by Presbyterian minister James McGready at the Red River Meeting House (in southern Kentucky, about 7 miles north of the Tennessee border), several people pray to receive Christ. “During this sacrament, and until the Tuesday following, 10 persons we believe, were savingly brought home to Christ.” Meanwhile, God's Holy Spirit continues moving in the hearts of the families roughly 200 miles north at the Bullittsburg Baptist Church meeting house. By the summer of 1801 there have been 110 baptisms of both free and enslaved men and women at and near this frontier church led by Rev. John Taylor and others in what is now northern Boone County Kentucky, less than two miles from the Ohio River. Then, from August 6–13, 1801, an outdoor meeting based on Scottish traditions of Holy Fairs (communion services) was hosted by a small Presbyterian church at Cane Ridge, Kentucky. Its minister Barton W. Stone had invited nearly 20 other ministers—Presbyterian, Methodist and Baptist—to also participate. Between 10,000 and 20,000 people came from “forty, fifty, and a hundred miles to attend this meeting” at the sparsely populated rural setting. Now known as the Cane Ridge Revival, it was the largest camp meeting of the Second Great Awakening.

== Today ==
Bullittsburg Baptist church has a small, active membership today. Sunday Services are at 10:30 a.m. Its location is at Exit 11 from I-275 across the interstate from the Creation Museum.
