= World Imitation Productions =

- Also known as: Monitor, The Tikis
- Origin: Los Angeles
- Genres: Punk rock, Post-Punk, New Wave, Experimental, Xerox art, Conceptual Art, Happening, Mail Art
- Years active: 1977–1982
- Label: World Imitation Records
- Past members: Steve Thomsen; Laurie O’Connell; Michael Uhlenkott; Anne Connor; Jeffrey Rankin; Keith Mitchell

World Imitation Productions (WImP) was an interdisciplinary art and music collective active during the early years of punk in Los Angeles, California, through the late 1970s and early 1980s (c. 1977–1982).

Their work involved the creation of xeroxed zines (a series of collage-based booklets sold at punk and record shops locally and internationally), art exhibitions, happenings, staged events, and mail art exchanged with other contemporary artists.

The WImP collective was known "most famously (as) the legendary music group Monitor. They also wrote, performed, recorded, and released music under the band name The Tikis.

The core members of WImP and Monitor were Steve Thomsen, Michael Uhlenkott, Laurie O’Connell, Jeffrey Rankin, Anne Connor, and Keith Mitchell. When performing as Monitor, Steve Thomsen played synthesizer and keyboards; Michael Uhlenkott played guitar and provided vocals; Laurie O'Connell provided vocals and played bass, and Jeffrey Rankin originally played drums, succeeded after the first 45 by Keith Mitchell who, in his later work with other bands, became known as "the Buddy Rich of punk".) Peripherally, artist Jeffrey Vallance and Boyd Rice, of the industrial band NON, with Robert Turman, were occasional contributors.

== Biography ==
=== Origins ===
All of the core members (except for Keith Mitchell) were from California's San Fernando Valley and attended James Monroe High School, and, later, California State University, Northridge (Uhlenkott, Thomsen, and O'Connell) and UCLA (Rankin and Connor). Keith Mitchell attended Long Beach City College. Additionally, Uhlenkott, O'Connell, and Thomsen all lived communally through the early to mid-70s. This period saw a number of artistic endeavors performed by the group before the organization of the members into the World Imitation Productions collective.

Their early, pre-WImP work involved semi-performance-based, Situationist-style conceptual, experiential, and prank-based art. Notable endeavors included site-specific installations and modifications within the Disneyland theme park. The collective would alter the park's attractions by leaving battery-powered cassette decks playing soundtracks and recordings they had created. They also affixed incongruous items to the scenery within rides and removed and cataloged "liberated" park elements as artifact-like art pieces.

During this period, Michael Uhlenkott also collaborated with fellow student and artist Jeffrey Vallance on installation and prank-based art in an artistic vein similar to, but separate from, the work of the collective. They also worked in a method of shared art development they termed "fixing up", wherein they would pass works of art back and forth, modifying and building upon each other's work.

=== World Imitation Productions ===
In the fall of 1977, the collective formalized their work into more tangible pieces as they began producing handmade tracts consisting of collage art, drawings, paintings, and prints. The initial set of zines and booklets carried the name Science Holiday (a moniker inherited from Hollywood artist Skot Armstrong, who was also known for work in xeroxed collage and mail art). As they began producing these physical works, the group formed the imprint of World Imitation Productions as the originator/distributor of their printed matter.

Notable work from this period includes the books and zines Tesla-Rama, Hula Dance, Glow in the Dark, Afraid of Modern Living, Walkie-Talkie, Computer Buddy, and Really Twins. Their zine work was primarily self-distributed to boutiques, record stores, and curiosity shops in the Los Angeles, New York, and San Francisco areas. However, they also sent out magazines as part of a mail-art network with other artists, including Mark Mothersbaugh of DEVO, Genesis P. Orridge of Throbbing Gristle, Daniel Miller, Irene Dogmatic, and other bands/artists. Their art was also featured as spreads in the culturally significant WET Magazine ("The Magazine of Gourmet Bathing").

On October 21, 1978, WImP presented an extravagant introduction to the larger art world—the World Imitation Products Exhibition, held in Mary Jones and Joe Clower's 4th Street Gallery, a sprawling loft on Los Angeles's Skid Row. There, WImP exhibited a collection of curiosities and media, featuring Uhlenkott's 20-ft. mural of the human circulatory system (with parakeets) and walls filled with large paste-up pages from the magazines, as well as Jeffrey Vallance's black-lit Ronald McDonald doll wall and Thomsen's plastic atomic workmen model, along with his homage to Nikola Tesla. The Uhlenkott family living room, an installation of family furniture, photos, knickknacks, and ephemera, provided a restful nook for the bewildered guests. That evening, the collective, dressed in formal wear, cut a wedding cake to serve to the crowd.

WImP expanded into musical production (both related to and beyond the scope of their eventual formation of a musical act) in 1979, launching the World Imitation record label. The label became the vehicle by which they released their own work and also a platform to serve similarly nascent outsider musical acts. WImP produced and released the debut EP of the Arizona mega-punk band the Meat Puppets, In a Car, in 1981 and recorded the Meat Puppets' debut LP, which they handed off to Spot for remixing, to be released on SST Records.

=== Monitor ===
In February 1978, the collective began to work with musical instruments as a means to "translate the World Imitation collage aesthetic into sound". World Imitation's artistic work brought them into contact with sound engineer and producer Ed Barger (who also recorded early works by Devo) after a year-long mail-art exchange, meeting in person at WImP's Products exhibition.

Of the WImP collective's members, only Michael Uhlenkott and Steve Thomsen had significant musical experience. Steve Thomsen was accomplished in playing the organ and ragtime piano. Michael Uhlenkott played the guitar, sang, and wrote songs for his folk-rock band Cañon with the collective's high school friend Allison Anders, who later became a noted filmmaker.

Performing in the original Hollywood punk-rock scene, Monitor produced music that blended "archaic influences with modern technology". While the sounds of the larger Los Angeles punk scene were marked by a loud, convulsive onslaught with harsh vocals, Monitor's sound, notably understated and rhythmically complex, was described as "alternately quiet and mysteriously disquieting". Monitor's music drew from classical structures, medieval through baroque; film soundtracks; and early electronic music, punctuated by inspiration from "primitive" sounds of traditional global folk music and psychedelic elements from the music of the late '60s.

Though they played infrequently and released only three records, the group was considered both remarkable and influential, producing work that was "unusual for its sophistication, and used African and Eastern European rhythms and minor-key melodies to create a sound unlike anyone else." By contrast, their eponymous full album, Monitor, includes the track "Hair"—performed by the Meat Puppets, which follows punk's more traditional sound. Although Monitor disliked the terms "art band" or "art rock", they were often referred to as such due to their unique sound, "imaginative use of instruments", and theatrical onstage presence.

Monitor released three records on their own World Imitation Productions label: the 1979 7-inch single ("Beak" / "Pet Wedding"); the 1981 full-length, self-titled album; and earlier the same year, the 7-inch single by The Tikis.

Their last live appearance was on the April 10, 1982, show of Peter Ivers' New Wave Theater.

==== The Elks Lodge police riot ====
On March 17, 1979, the members of Monitor were present at, and witnesses to, a group punk rock show at the Elks Lodge Auditorium in Los Angeles that became known as the "Elks Lodge Riot," the "Elks Lodge Police Riot", the "St. Paddy's Day Massacre", etc. The Los Angeles Police Department, using the aggressive nature of punk rock shows and audiences as the excuse to raid the venue, attacked the audience and musicians, beating them severely. Investigating the incident, Monitor's O'Connell interviewed the Rampart Division sergeant and published a critical editorial on the event in Slash magazine, the premiere Los Angeles punk tabloid. The incident was also the topic of Alice Bag's film A Riot of Our Own.

==== The Tikis ====
In early 1981, the members of Monitor released a 7" single under the band name The Tikis, with two tracks: "Junie," a cheesy-pop satire about spontaneous combustion, and "Surfadelic", an instrumental with a surf-rock-inspired sound. Their only release as The Tikis, each record included a coupon that could be mailed (with a self-addressed, stamped envelope) to receive a free, handmade tiki pendant created by one of the band members.

=== Influences ===
The location and timing of the collective's upbringing heavily influenced the nature of their work. The collective began during the post-Space Age/pre-Internet era of the late 1970s when much of the optimistic futurism of the earlier era had fallen out of fashion, but at a time when communication and information distribution was localized, physical in nature, and slowly paced.

The collective often references science (in general) as an influence and, more specifically, Nikola Tesla. Other stated influences include "The Church," "our moms", and a semi-fictional character, Herb Lane. Musically, the collective cited bands that they liked, such as The Screamers, People, Human Hands, and Phranc. Though their music clearly reflects their interest in the early Western classical canon from the medieval era through the baroque, as well as a concurrent nod to international indigenous pieces of music and cheesy pop—most notably the faux exotica of Martin Denny—they have stated "really, no one, ourselves" to the question of their direct influences, and have noted that their music tended to be created by accident. Their work also reveals strong influence from "cultural artifacts", "icons—from tikis to televisions", mass entertainment (Disneyland, in particular), and the "decaying vision of the future conceived of in the 1950s".

That's mainly what we want to do, make our music and art the same thing ... The process is kind of important because we usually make our music by accident ... Like we'll be playing just nothing, and we'll accidentally come upon something, and in our art, we do the same thing. We just sort of ... throw things together and ... it happens, you know? It's happening. – Michael Uhlenkott

=== Post WImP ===
The art collective wound down when the band began to take up more time, though Thomsen and Uhlenkott continued to create art individually. Monitor broke up in 1982 as the Los Angeles punk scene morphed and split into factions: psychedelia, country, hardcore, post-punk, etc.

After their time together producing work as WImP and as the band Monitor, the individuals pursued divergent careers, mainly in the arts.

- Steve Thomsen continued creating art books in the form of collage-based chapbooks. Musically, he went on to perform in the bands Solid Eye (in 1992, with Joseph Hammer and Rick Potts) and Swan Trove (in 1995, with Joseph Hammer), and released solo works on cassette and CD. He now resides in the southwest U.S. and spends time investigating mine shafts and caves for phosphorescent formations and geological curiosities.
- Michael Uhlenkott graduated from CSUN as an art major and later studied music theory at Los Angeles City College. He worked for the City of Los Angeles as a graphic designer and traveled extensively in the South Pacific, creating a gazetteer of the region and founding the Robert Dean Frisbie Society. He continues to create art and compose music, with a sonata series premiering at Cambridge University in 2017 and a recording in the works. After Monitor, Michael played with the bands Boneheads, The Romans, and Billy Wisdom and the Hee-Shees before returning to his original focus on classical music.
- Laurie O'Connell did postgrad work in English literature at CSUN and works as a writer and editor. Based in far northern California, she homeschooled her two daughters, is involved in radical politics and animal rescue, and serves on the board of Northstate Women's Health Network.
- Jeff Rankin graduated from CSUN as an English lit major. He became the director of public services at the UCLA Special Collections Library.
- Anne Connor graduated from UCLA Library School and became the Director of Los Angeles Public Library's Central Library.
- Keith Mitchell went on to play drums in the bands The Romans, Opal, Green on Red, Billy Wisdom and the Hee-Shees, and Mazzy Star. He died after a short battle with cancer on May 14, 2017.

== Notable exhibits ==
- 1978
  - World Imitation Products Exhibition, 4th Street Gallery, Los Angeles, CA (October 7–November 7)
- 1981
  - The Fix-It-Up Show, LACE (Los Angeles Contemporary Exhibitions) Gallery, Los Angeles, CA (October 7–November 8)
  - "Work by more than 30 artists that were altered, or 'fixed up' by Michael Uhlenkott and Jeffrey Vallance. Modification techniques included banging against and dragging over concrete, gluing on hair, and similar broad, gestural treatments." Artists whose work was "fixed up" by Uhlenkott and Vallance included Ed Ruscha, Chris Burden, George Herms, Mary Jones, Mike Kelley, Suzanne Lacy, Grant Mudford, Pierre Picot, Betye Saar, Ilene Segalove, and Alexis Smith.
- 2014
  - Valley Vista: Art in the San Fernando Valley, CA. 1970–1990
- 2017
  - Afraid of Modern Living: World Imitation & Monitor 1977–1982, These Days, Los Angeles, CA (March 4–May 7)
- 2023
  - Copy Machine Manifestos: Artists Who Make Zines, Brooklyn Museum, Brooklyn, NY (November 17, 2023 – March 31, 2024)

== Discography as 'Monitor' ==
- Beak - 7" single (1979)
  - "Beak"
  - "Pet Wedding"
- Darker Skratcher (LAFMS compilation, 1980)
  - Guardian (track A5)
- The Tikis - 7" single (1981, Monitor as "The Tikis")
  - Junie
  - Surfadelic
- Monitor - Album (1981)
  - "We Get Messages"
  - "Mokele Mbembe"
  - "In Terrae Interium"
  - "Herb Lane Theme"
  - "Amphibious"
  - "Pavilion"
  - "Phosphorea"
  - "Hair" (performed by the Meat Puppets)
  - "I Saw Dead Jim's Shade"
- Monitor - Re-release on German label AtaTak / Suezan Studio - CD boxed set (2011)
- Monitor - Re-release on Superior Viaduct - vinyl and CD with poster (2013)

== Publications ==
- Science Holiday, October 1977, 8.5” x 11”
- Science Holiday 2, November 1977, 8.5” x 11”
- The Doppler Effect, January 1978, 8” x 5” (by Steve Thomsen)
- The “Kooky” World of Magnets, January 1978, 5.5” x 8.5”
- Surf Rules, February 1978, 5.5” x 8.5”
- Spring Cleaning with Science Holiday, March 1978, 5.5” x 8.5”
- International Rotation Circus, (set of approximately 25 cards) June(?) 1978, 2.75” x 3.5”
- Tesla-Rama, August 1978, 5.5” x 8.5”
- Afraid of Modern Living, September 1978, 5.5” x 4.25”
- Luxurious Trip to Europe, September/October 1978, 5.5” x 4.25” (by Michael Uhlenkott)
- Really Twins, September/October 1978, 2” x 1.25” (by Steve Thomsen)
- E.P.I.I.A., (insert in WET magazine v3, #2) September/October 1978, 8.5” x 11”
- WImP Exhibition Opening invitations, October 1978, 5.5” x 4.25”
- Hula Dance, October/November 1978, 5.5” x 8.5”
- Glow in the Dark, November 1978, 2.75” x 3.5” (by Steve Thomsen)
- Computer Buddy, December 1978/January 1979, 5.5” x 8.5”
- I Hate This Trip! 1978, 8”x5” (by Steve Thomsen)
- Oddly Shaped for Tomorrow’s Use, 1978, 8” x 5”
- Trapped! c. 1978, 8”x5” (by Steve Thomsen)
- Romance (insert in WET magazine v. 3, #4) January/February 1979, 10.5” x1 3.5”
- Walkie-Talkie, April(?)1979, 5.5” x 4.25”
- Wig, (unfinished), Summer 1979, 5.5” x 8.5”
- See’s Disneyland, 1979, 2.75” x 3” (by Steve Thomsen)
- Chihuahua of the Chihuahua, c. 1979, 2” x 2.75” (by Steve Thomsen)
- Happy Birthday, (unfinished), c. 1979, (by Steve Thomsen)
- Snake Eyes… Does Exist, c. 1979, 8” x 5” (by Steve Thomsen)
- “Surprise!” c. 1979, 8” x 5.25” (by Steve Thomsen)
- Throw Your Voice, c. 1979, 2.25” x 2.25” (by Steve Thomsen)
- You’ll Think You Are There! c. 1979, 8” x 5” (by Steve Thomsen)
- Young Children and Their Problems, c. 1979, 5.5” x 8.5” (by Steve Thomsen)
- Fortuna, 1980, 2.5” x 2.5” (by Jeffrey Rankin)
- Skull Assembly Voodoo Doll, (insert in Diana’s Second Almanac) 1980, 5.5” x 8.5”
- Eep, c. 1981, 3” x 3.5” (by Steve Thomsen)
- Don’t, 1982, 5.5” x 4.25” (by Steve Thomsen)
- 3D, 1982, 4” x 3” (by Steve Thomsen)
- Afraid of Modern Living: World Imitation & Monitor 1977–1982, 2019, Sounds on Paper (by A. S. Beecroft) Authorized biography of World Imitation Productions, an expanded version of the catalog for the collective's 2017 retrospective exhibition at These Days, Los Angeles)
