= The Monitor =

The Monitor may refer to:

== Publications ==
- The Monitor, or the British Freeholder, an 18th-century British periodical
- The Monitor (Kansas City), a free monthly newspaper distributed in the Kansas City metropolitan area
- The Monitor (Kirksville, MO), an alternative newspaper at Truman State University
- The Monitor (Montreal), a former community weekly paper in Montreal, now online only
- The Monitor (San Francisco), a former Catholic weekly newspaper in San Francisco
- The Monitor (Sydney), a former biweekly newspaper in Sydney, New South Wales
- The Monitor (Texas), a newspaper covering the Rio Grande Valley
- The Monitor (Uganda), a national newspaper with its sister "Sunday Monitor"
- The Christian Science Monitor, an international news organization founded in 1908 and based in Boston, that publishes self-titled periodicals
- Concord Monitor, a daily newspaper in New Hampshire, United States
- Daily Monitor, a Ugandan newspaper
- Monitor (Polish newspaper), an 18th-century Polish newspaper
- Monitor (magazine), a news magazine published in Podgorica, Montenegro

== Other ==
- USS Monitor, the United States Navy's first ironclad warship
- The Monitor (comics), a DC Comics character from Crisis on Infinite Earths
- The Monitor (album), an album by the band Titus Andronicus
- The Monitor (film), the 2011 Norwegian film originally named Babycall

== See also ==
- The Monitors (disambiguation)
- Monitor (disambiguation)
