= John Taylor (Baptist preacher) =

American Baptist preacher (1752–1833)

John Taylor (1752–1833) was a pioneer Baptist preacher, religious writer, frontier historian and planter in north and central Kentucky. His two histories of early Baptist churches in Kentucky provide insight into the frontier society of the early decades of the 19th century. His 1820 pamphlet entitled "Thoughts on Missions" put him at the center of the controversy within frontier Baptist congregations about supporting mission societies. In buying and selling land on the frontier, Taylor acquired 2,000 acres (8.1 km^{2}) and 20 African-American slaves by the end of the first decade of the 19th century, thus entering the planter class.

== Early life and education ==
Taylor was born in 1752 in Fauquier County, Virginia to a farming family. He was taught at home to read, write and do his numbers. Although christened in the Church of England, he was strongly influenced by the preaching of the Baptist William Marshall, whom he first heard at age 17. Taylor united with the Baptists when he was 20 years old and began preaching on the frontier while living in Virginia.

In his History of Clear Creek Church: and Campbellism Exposed (1830), Taylor provided material about his origins:

At my birth, and in the early part of my life, my lot was cast in the backwoods of Virginia, where Indians often killed people, not far from where I was. My parents, who were of the church of England, told me, I had been christened when young. Being taught in all the rules of the old prayer book, I had my partialities that way; but we lived so frontier, I never heard any man preach, till about 17 years old; this was a baptist, (William Marshall). My awakening that day, was so striking, that I was won over to Marshall, and the religion he taught. A little more than two years after this, by the conviction I had from the New Testament, I was baptised [sic], and became a baptist from principle. To this way, and cause, I have had warm and decided attachments ever since. I would not be hard or unfriendly to other christian societies; but I am a decided, full bred baptist. ...

== Marriage and family ==
Taylor married Elizabeth Cavanaugh, daughter of Philemon and Nancy (Cave) Kavanaugh. They had several children together. Their son Ben was born a month after their arrival in Kentucky in December 1783, after a difficult three-month trip from Virginia through the mountains. Their daughter Jane married Jeconiah Singleton, another early Baptist pioneer and son of Manoah and Sally (Craig) Singleton, members of the early Forks of Elkhorn Church. The Singletons had migrated to Kentucky in 1781 with The Travelling Church, led by Sally's brother, the Rev. Lewis Craig, pastor of the notable congregation.

== Career ==
While Taylor was in his 20s, he organized and served churches in the Virginia frontier settlements. At age 29, he took his young family to Kentucky in late 1783, two years after the historic migration of "The Traveling Church" of Baptists from Spotsylvania County, Virginia. Later he wrote about the trip: "... We arrived at Craig's Station, a little before Christmas (1783), and about three months after our start from Virginia. Through all this rugged travel my wife was in a very helpless state; about one month after our arrival, my son Ben was born." He was soon called as the first pastor in Clear Creek Baptist Church, Woodford County, Kentucky.

In 1795 Taylor moved with his family to Boone County, where he was the stated preacher at Bullittsburg Baptist Church (1795–1802), the first church in northern Kentucky. Seven of his slaves were also members of the church. He was ministering there when the church experienced a revival in 1800–01 (during the period referred to in the South as the "Second Great Awakening"). A total of 113 people converted and were baptized into Taylor's church. Never financially supported by a church, he pursued independent farming and other vocations, as did most frontier preachers.

In addition to acting as a pastor, Taylor was part of organizing local Baptist associations in Kentucky. In 1785 Taylor attended the organizing conference of the Elkhorn Baptist Association (Lexington, Kentucky area). He also was part of organizing the Long Run Baptist Association (Louisville, Kentucky area) in 1803. There he preached the Introductory Sermon and was on the committee of organization. He became one of the early leaders of that association.

In 1802 he moved his family to Gallatin County (a portion now in Trimble County) near Mount Byrd along the Ohio River, where he had already bought nearly 3,000 acres (12 km^{2}) of land in various tracts. There he entered the planter class, for he eventually held 20 enslaved African Americans and owned 2,000 acres (8.1 km^{2}), selling some of his former land to other settlers to create a community. Historians of the antebellum South define planters as those people who held 20 or more slaves to work their land. While not all Baptists held as many slaves as Taylor, by this time most members had accommodated to the Southern institution and stopped calling for its abolition. "Far more than their Northern counterparts, Southern evangelical Protestants stressed the importance of individual piety rather than social regeneration."

Ministering in Gallatin County for 13 years, Taylor also stayed in contact with the churches and pastors of the Boone County area. He attended a total of 25 North Bend Association meetings from 1805 through 1834. He was invited to preach virtually each time he attended. Fourteen of the visits were at Boone County churches, which hosted the association meetings.

In 1815 Taylor moved his family and slaves to Franklin County to be further from the free state of Indiana, which proximity across the Ohio River from Gallatin County he had believed threatened his slave holdings. The missionary James E. Welch, who knew him, wrote a biography of the preacher, saying Taylor had left Gallatin because of differences with his congregation. He helped found a Baptist church in Frankfort. Next he helped establish one at Buck Run in 1818, where he was invited to pastor. Instead, he chose to preach there regularly for several years.

Many religious historians have identified Taylor's leading role in the disputes over the Missionary/Anti-missionary movement that arose among Protestant churches in the United States in the 1820s. In his booklet, "Thoughts on Missions" (1820), Taylor criticized mission societies and their methods of soliciting money from frontier churches. Later in life, he expressed regret over writing the 36-page pamphlet. The historian Larry D. Smith noted that Taylor was opposed only to "mission societies;" he was never opposed to missions.

Most of Taylor's ministry preceded the controversy associated with the anti-missionary movement among Baptists, and he did not appear to have "divided" with his brethren over the issue. In 1820 Taylor gave a copy of his "Missions" pamphlet to the local (North Bend) Association, but they made no comment on it. He was still invited to preach for the association that year and at later times when he attended their meetings. In 1820 the Elkhorn Association reported, "Bro. John Taylor presented to the Association a pamphlet, written by himself, on the subject of missions, which was referred to the committee on arrangement." At a later session of the body, "after much discussion it was agreed to strike out that item from the arrangement, and return the pamphlet to the author." Similarly, Taylor gave the booklet to the Long Run Association; there was no surviving record of any response. He was honored by being one of two preachers asked to conduct the funeral of Absalom Graves, who was then the leading advocate of missions in the northern part of the state.

Though not formally educated, Taylor was an expressive writer with strong opinions. His A History of Ten Churches was first printed in 1823, and A History of Clear Creek Church: and Campbellism Exposed in 1830. He also wrote several brief biographies, as well as many articles that were published in religious periodicals. The Concise Dictionary of American Biography describes A History of Ten Baptist Churches as "a fine picture of religion on the frontier."

When asked to tell about Taylor's life, James E. Welch, a frontier Baptist missionary, wrote:

I saw this aged brother at the meeting of the Elkhorn Association, at the Big Spring Church, near Frankfort, in 1832. He was a member of the Body; and yet he took his place on the front seat of the gallery. The Moderator, observing him, said, — 'Come down, Brother Taylor, and sit with us;' but he promptly replied, — 'I am a free man, Brother Moderator,' and kept his seat. (The gallery was a balcony where the slave members and attendees of the church were seated during worship services.) He was low of stature, muscular, had broad shoulders and a broad face, high cheek bones and heavy eyebrows, over-hanging a pair of light and small, but expressive, eyes. He was plain, and by no means particular, in his apparel, and rather reserved in conversation, though, at times, he seemed to enjoy a dry joke upon his brethren.

Taylor died in 1833 in Franklin County, Kentucky near Forks of Elkhorn Creek, the year of a major cholera epidemic in the region. Welch wrote: "His death was peaceful and tranquil, and he has left behind him a name worthy of enduring remembrance." The 19th-century historian William Cathcart wrote, "He [Taylor] traveled and preached extensively and probably performed more labor, and was more successful than any other pioneer Baptist preacher in Kentucky."

== Works ==
- A History of Ten Baptist Churches, Frankfort, KY: (np), 1823; reprint, Cincinnati, OH: Art Guild Reprints, Inc., 1968; reprint with ed. Chester R. Young, Macon, GA: Mercer University Press: 1995, as Baptist Churches on the American Frontier.
- A History of Clear Creek Church: and Campbellism Exposed, Frankfort, KY, Printed by A. G. Hodges, Commentator Office, 1830
