= Moniteur =

Moniteur may refer to:

- Belgian official journal (Moniteur Belge), the official journal of Belgium
- Le Moniteur Universel, a French newspaper between 1789 and 1901, and at times the official journal of the French government
- Il Monitore Napoletano, gazette of the short-lived Parthenopaean Republic which was named in emulation of the above French one
- Le Moniteur de la Louisiane
- Le Moniteur ottoman
- Le Moniteur (Haiti), gazette of the Republic of Haiti founded in 1876
- Le Moniteur des travaux publics et du bâtiment, a French magazine founded in 1903
- Saint Monitor, French bishop of Orléans in the 5th century and saint of the Catholic Church
