= Jeffrey Vallance =

American artist (born 1955)

- Vallance in audience with King Taufa'ahau Tupou IV of Tonga at the Royal Palace in Nuku'alofa, 1985
- Born: Jeffrey Karl Reese Vallance; January 25, 1955 (age 71); Redondo Beach, California, U.S.
- Known for: Art

Jeffrey Karl Reese Vallance (born January 25, 1955) is an American contemporary artist who lives and works in Los Angeles, California. His projects are combinations of object-making, installation, performance, curation, and anthropological study.

== Early life ==
Vallance was born on January 25, 1955, in Redondo Beach, California. He grew up in the San Fernando Valley of Southern California, when the region was being transformed from agricultural and suburban communities into tract homes and strip malls. Much of Vallance's early work is influenced by regional iconography and pop culture, including his parents' fascination with Polynesian/Tiki imagery, and his stepfather's affection for President Richard M. Nixon.

Vallance received a BA in Art from California State University, Northridge, in 1979, and an MFA from the Otis Art Institute, Los Angeles, in 1981.

Vallance is the leading force in a distinct version of Intervention Art called Infiltration Art. He creates art by interacting with real-world institutions, communities, politicians, religions, museums and pop-culture figures, tampering within bureaucratic structures to create change without creating conflict. His first public infiltration took place in 1977, when, dressed as a janitor, he snuck into the Los Angeles County Museum of Art and exchanged the gallery wall-socket plates with his own hand-painted versions.

Vallance's childhood involvement with his local Lutheran church inspired much of his later interest in and depictions of religious subjects. Young Vallance was also influenced by the morbid humor of The Addams Family and The Munsters television shows, and the feature films The Loved One, Harold and Maude and Mondo Cane (which he now describes as "a sick collection of imagery that warped my young mind"). Vallance's first formal training was from his maternal grandfather, Norwegian folk artist Karl Reese, for whom he is (middle-)named.

Vallance has performed interactions with over 80 foreign dignitaries, including audiences with King Taufa'ahau Tupou IV of Tonga at the Royal Palace in Nuku'alofa, Pope John Paul II at the Vatican, and Icelandic presidents Vigdís Finnbogadóttir and Ólafur Ragnar Grímsson at Forseti Höll in Reykjavík. During the Cold War in the early 1970s, Vallance corresponded with government officials in the Soviet Union and China, trading political badges with communist party leaders. As a result, Vallance was investigated by the FBI.

In the mid-1970s, Vallance created a series of his own wallets, complete with identification cards and photos. Vallance then deliberately "lost" the wallets at government and public institutions such as the White House. Shown in the Library Building, the wallets were displayed alongside the letters received, on official stationery, when they were returned to him by US Mail. Vallance also did a series of drawings of a bearded and bespectacled Dr. Loam. The series depicted Dr. Loam interacting with various and sundry aspects of life, culminating with one titled Dr. Loam gets a Lobotomy. Quickly drawn with colorful markers on poster board, Vallance hung the posters all over the campus.

== Career ==
In 1983, Vallance traveled to Polynesia in search of the myth of Tiki. The resulting artwork, exhibited first in Los Angeles and then internationally, inspired a new genre which came to be known as Tiki Art.

In 1992, while doing volunteer work for the city-council campaign of disgraced former Washington, D.C. mayor Marion Barry (who had just been released from six months in federal prison for smoking crack), Vallance curated "Splashing with Barry (Marion Barry Pool Party)," an art exhibit at Barry's residence in the Washington View Apartments.

Other projects include creating a Richard Nixon Museum; traveling to the Vatican, Turin and Milan, Italy to study Christian relics; installing an exhibit aboard a tugboat in the Västerbotten Maritime Museum in Umeå, Sweden; curating shows in the so-called fabulous museums of Las Vegas—the Liberace Museum, Debbie Reynolds' Hollywood Hotel and Casino, Ocean Spray Cranberry World Museum and Ron Lee's World of Clowns Museum; and initiating a campaign called "Preserving America's Cultural Heritage"—a federal bill that would establish a benefit fund for all living visual artists in the United States. In 2004, Vallance curated the first art-world exhibition of artist Thomas Kinkade, entitled "Thomas Kinkade: Heaven on Earth," at CalState Fullerton's Grand Central Art Center in Orange County, California.

Vallance's many forms of work have been exhibited at museums and galleries throughout the world, including Dakar, Senegal; Reykjavík, Iceland; Zurich, Switzerland; Milan, Italy; Paris, France; Mexico City, Mexico; Amsterdam and Middelburg, Netherlands; Vienna, Austria; Sydney and Tasmania, Australia; Stockholm, Sweden; London, United Kingdom; and Athens, Greece. He is represented by Bernier/Eliades in Athens, Galerie Nathalie Obadia in Paris, Margo Leavin Gallery in Los Angeles and Tanya Bonakdar Gallery in New York.

== In popular culture ==
In 1983, Vallance was the host of MTV's The Cutting Edge, which premiered experimental music videos from such musicians as R.E.M., The Bangles and The Police, and featured Vallance's artwork. Also in 1983, Vallance appeared on NBC's Late Night with David Letterman to discuss what was then his best-known project, Blinky the Friendly Hen, in which he purchased a frozen chicken from a grocery store and buried it at a Los Angeles pet cemetery, and Cultural Ties, a "mail art" project involving the exchange of neckwear with such international dignitaries as Anwar Sadat, King Hussein of Jordan, Austrian president Rudolf Kirchschläger and dozens of others.

In 1984, Vallance appeared on an episode of The Regis Philbin Show to teach Philbin how to make art. He has also appeared in numerous European and Asian arts and culture documentaries.

Having created album-cover artwork for several early-'80s punk bands including Monitor, Vallance was hired by Grammy-winning art director Kevin Reagan to create art for the cover of singer-songwriter Peter Case's album Six-Pack of Love (Geffen) in 1992.

Vallance also created an onstage backdrop for the band Oingo Boingo which was used on tour and seen on The Joan Rivers Show.

== Awards ==
In 2004, Vallance received the prestigious John Simon Guggenheim Memorial Foundation award for installation art. In 2001, he received a Stiftelsen Framtidens Kultur (Foundation Culture of the Future) grant to curate a performance festival at the Ice Hotel in northern Sweden. In 2000, he was conferred with the royal title of Honorary Noble by the Tongan National Center, Nuku'alofa, Tonga, and also received a Distinguished Alumnus Award from Otis College of Art and Design, Los Angeles.

== Paranormalcy ==
Since 2003, when psychic medium Dorothy Maksym identified Vallance as being the earthly spokesperson for the disembodied spirit of former US president Richard M. Nixon (The Haunting of the Presidents, by Joel Martin and William J. Birnes, Signet), Vallance has taken an interest in the paranormal, contributing stories to the UK's Fortean Times and leading ghost tours of the Nixon Library and Birthplace in Yorba Linda, California.

Vallance's interest in the paranormal was piqued by his paternal grandmother, a Long Beach, California, psychic who once appeared on Art Linkletter's House Party, and his maternal great-uncle Emil Knudsen, a world-renowned Norwegian psychic who was often enlisted by police and private citizens to find missing persons, dead bodies and lost objects throughout the world.

Vallance's paranormal research projects include Bigfoot, the Shroud of Turin, the Holy Lance, ghosts of dead US presidents, the Ravens of the Tower of London and the Loch Ness Monster.

For a project at the Frieze Art Fair in London, Vallance assembled psychic mediums to channel the spirits of five famous dead artists: Leonardo da Vinci, Marcel Duchamp, Frida Kahlo, Vincent van Gogh and Jackson Pollock. The project took the familiar form of a panel discussion, wherein the artist spirits responded to a series of questions prepared by Vallance. At the end of the program, the spirits responded to questions from the audience as well.

== Writings ==
Vallance has written for such publications and journals as Artforum, Art issues, L.A. Weekly, Juxtapoz, Frieze and Fortean Times, and has published nine books: Blinky the Friendly Hen; The World of Jeffrey Vallance: Collected Writings 1978–1994; Christian Dinosaur; Art on the Rocks; Preserving America's Cultural Heritage; Thomas Kinkade: Heaven on Earth; My Life with Dick; Relics and Reliquaries; and The Vallance Bible (2011).

== Academia ==
Since the mid-1980, Vallance has taught various forms of art at UCLA; Otis/Parsons; the University of Nevada, Las Vegas; Umeå University (Sweden); the University of Texas at San Antonio; the University of Tasmania (Australia), California State University Channel Islands; and the University of California, Santa Barbara.

He currently teaches a course called "The Art of Infiltration" at California Institute of the Arts (CalArts), in Santa Clarita, California.
