= Mount Pleasant, Kentucky =

Unincorporated community in Kentucky, United States

Mount Pleasant
- Unincorporated community
- Location within the state of Kentucky Mount Pleasant (the United States)
- Coordinates: 38°36′47″N 85°23′2″W
- Country: United States
- State: Kentucky
- County: Trimble
- Elevation: 850 ft (260 m)
- Time zone: UTC-6 (Eastern (EST))
  - Summer (DST): UTC-5 (EST)
- GNIS feature ID: 508647

Mount Pleasant is an unincorporated community located in Trimble County, Kentucky, in the United States. Its post office operated from 1892 to 1907.
