= Trimble County, Kentucky =

County in Kentucky, United States

- County
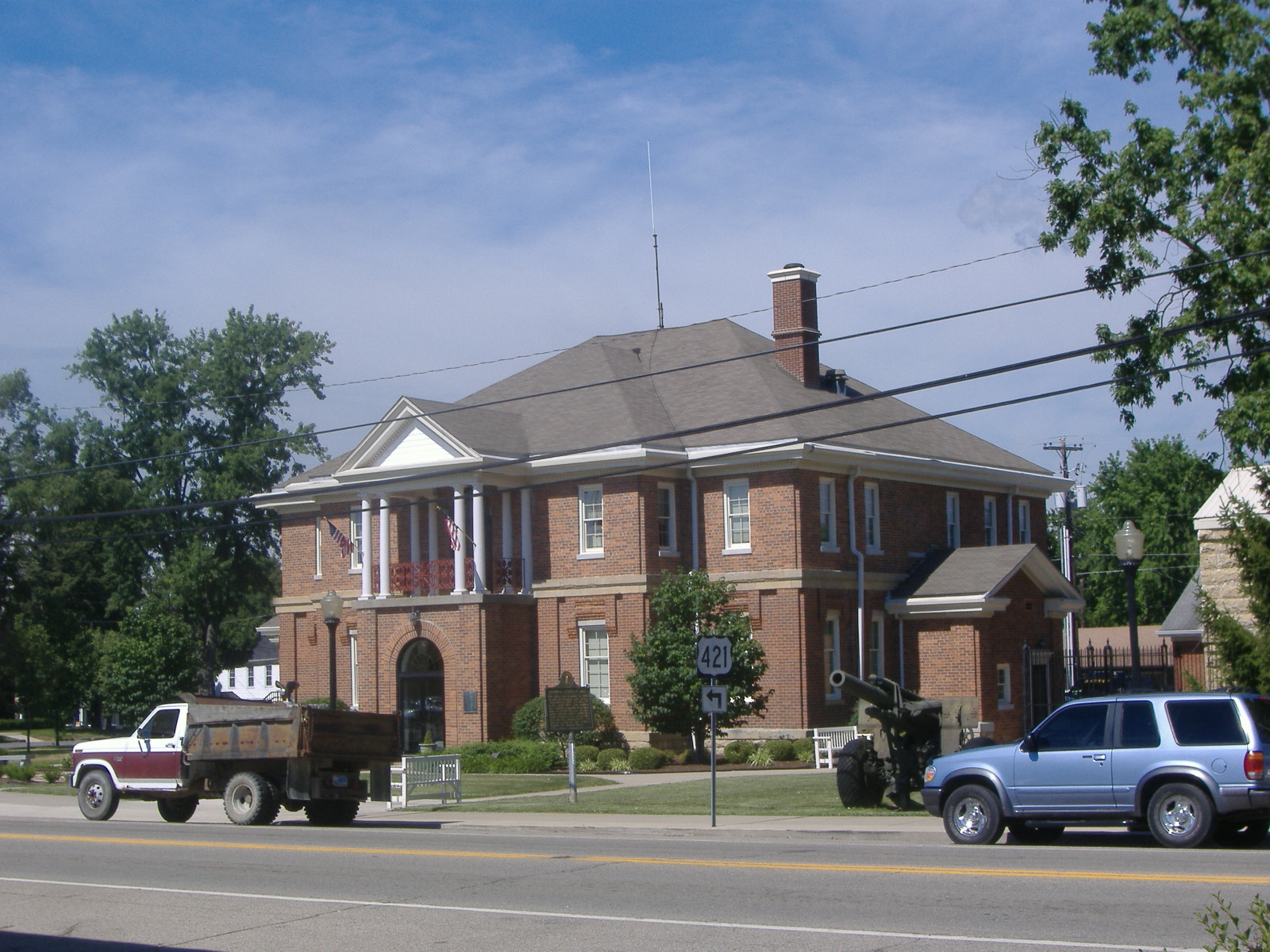
- Trimble County Courthouse in Bedford

- Location within the U.S. state of Kentucky
- Coordinates: 38°36′N 85°20′W
- Country: United States
- State: Kentucky
- Founded: March 27, 1837
- Seat: Bedford
- Largest city: Milton

Government
  - Judge/Executive: John David Ogburn Jr. (R)

Area
  - Total: 156 sq mi (400 km^{2})
  - Land: 152 sq mi (390 km^{2})
  - Water: 4.6 sq mi (12 km^{2}) 2.9%

Population (2020)
  - Total: 8,474
  - Estimate (2025): 8,701 ▲
  - Density: 55.7/sq mi (21.5/km^{2})
- Time zone: UTC−5 (Eastern)
  - Summer (DST): UTC−4 (EDT)
- Congressional district: 4th
- Website: trimblecountyky.gov

Trimble County is a county located in the north central part of the U.S. state of Kentucky. Its county seat is Bedford. The county was founded in 1837 and is named for Robert Trimble. Trimble is no longer a prohibition or dry county.

== Geography ==
According to the U.S. Census Bureau, the county has a total area of 156 square miles (400 km^{2}), of which 152 square miles (390 km^{2}) is land and 4.6 square miles (12 km^{2}) (2.9%) is water. It is the fifth-smallest county in Kentucky by land area and fourth-smallest by total area. The county's western border with Indiana is formed by the Ohio River.

The county is largely divided into two by a central roughly north–south ridge; to the east of which lie the Little Kentucky River and Daughtery, Buck, and Carmen Creeks; and to the west of which lie Spring, Corn, Middle, Patton's and Barebone Creeks, tributaries of the Ohio River.

=== Adjacent counties ===
- Jefferson County, Indiana (northwest)
- Carroll County (east)
- Henry County (southeast)
- Oldham County (southwest)
- Clark County, Indiana (west)

== Manufacturing ==
LG&E and KU's newest power plant, the Trimble County Generating Station, provides power to about 1 million Kentucky residents. and is located on 2,200 acres situated along the Ohio River, 50 miles northeast of Louisville. It has been recognized as one of the most environmentally friendly coal fired plants in the country. Controversy with the plant include the desire of the plant to dump its coal ash on its site. The EPA has said the plant should consider shipping the waste to Gallatin County, Kentucky to be placed in an underground limestone mine that already holds a permit to accept coal combustion waste.

== Demographics ==
Historical population
Census	Pop.	Note	%±
1840	4,480		—
1850	5,963		33.1%
1860	5,880		−1.4%
1870	5,577		−5.2%
1880	7,171		28.6%
1890	7,140		−0.4%
1900	7,272		1.8%
1910	6,512		−10.5%
1920	6,011		−7.7%
1930	5,348		−11.0%
1940	5,601		4.7%
1950	5,148		−8.1%
1960	5,102		−0.9%
1970	5,349		4.8%
1980	6,253		16.9%
1990	6,090		−2.6%
2000	8,125		33.4%
2010	8,809		8.4%
2020	8,474		−3.8%
2025 (est.)	8,701	▲	2.7%
U.S. Decennial Census; 1790–1960 1900–1990; 1990–2000 2010–2020

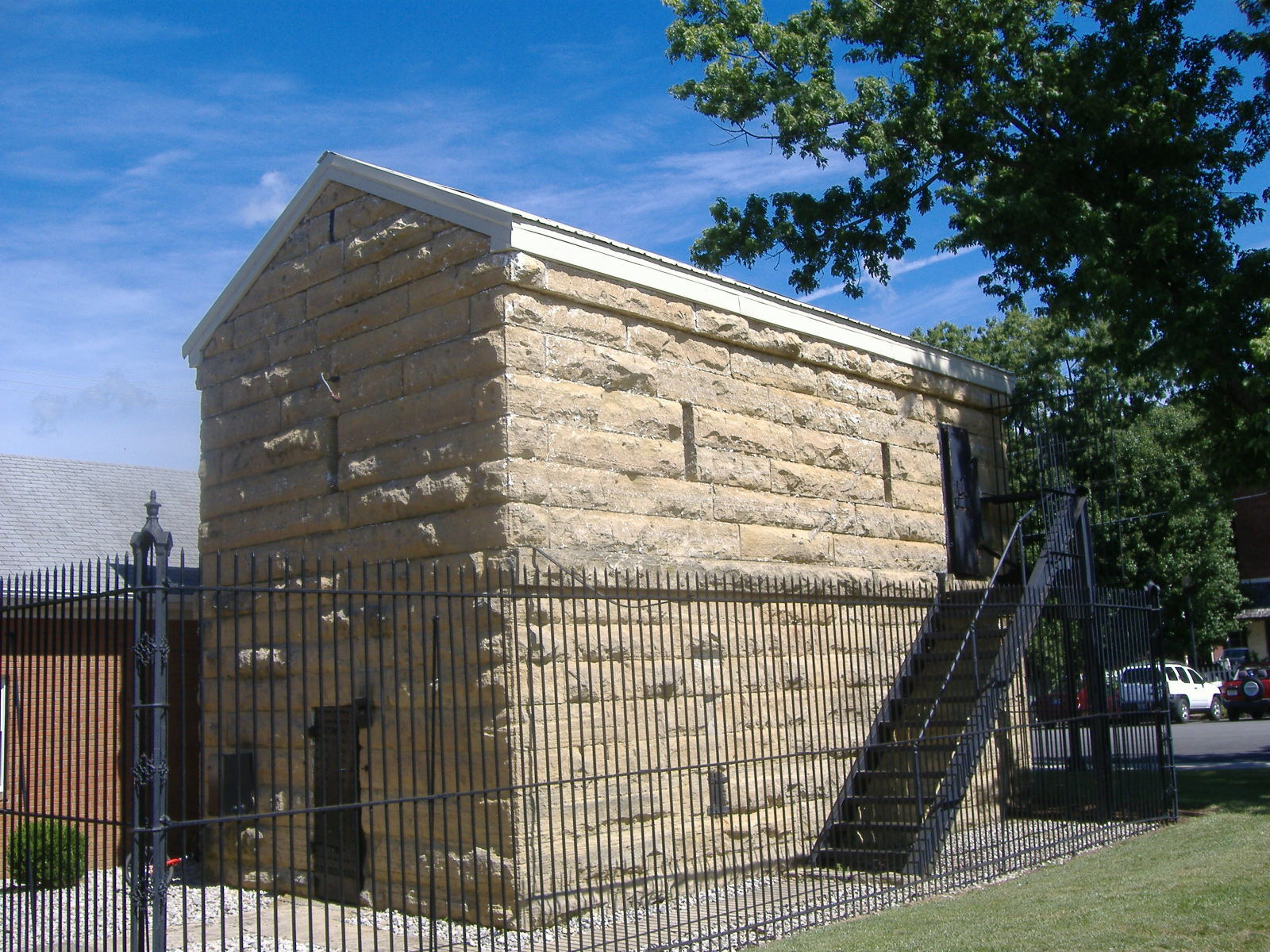
Trimble County Jail, built circa 1850

=== 2020 census ===
As of the 2020 census, the county had a population of 8,474. The median age was 44.2 years. 21.7% of residents were under the age of 18 and 18.9% of residents were 65 years of age or older. For every 100 females there were 100.4 males, and for every 100 females age 18 and over there were 99.8 males age 18 and over.

The racial makeup of the county was 94.3% White, 0.4% Black or African American, 0.4% American Indian and Alaska Native, 0.3% Asian, 0.0% Native Hawaiian and Pacific Islander, 0.6% from some other race, and 3.9% from two or more races. Hispanic or Latino residents of any race comprised 2.3% of the population.

0.0% of residents lived in urban areas, while 100.0% lived in rural areas.

There were 3,398 households in the county, of which 29.4% had children under the age of 18 living with them and 22.2% had a female householder with no spouse or partner present. About 25.4% of all households were made up of individuals and 11.4% had someone living alone who was 65 years of age or older.

There were 3,841 housing units, of which 11.5% were vacant. Among occupied housing units, 77.3% were owner-occupied and 22.7% were renter-occupied. The homeowner vacancy rate was 0.7% and the rental vacancy rate was 9.4%.

=== 2010 census ===
According to the census of 2010, there were 8,809 people and 3,512 households from 2009 to 2013. The population density was 55 per square mile (21/km^{2}). There were 3,437 housing units at an average density of 23 per square mile (8.9/km^{2}). The racial makeup of the county was 96.2% White, 1.5% Black or African American, 0.6% Native American, 0.5% Asian, 0.68% from other races, and 1.1% from two or more races. 3.5% of the population were Hispanic or Latino.

=== 2000 census ===
There were 3,137 households, out of which 35.40% had children under the age of 18 living with them, 60.60% were married couples living together, 8.50% had a female householder with no husband present, and 26.80% were non-families. 22.00% of all households were made up of individuals, and 9.10% had someone living alone who was 65 years of age or older. The average household size was 2.57 and the average family size was 3.00.

In the county, the population was spread out, with 26.40% under the age of 18, 7.70% from 18 to 24, 30.90% from 25 to 44, 23.60% from 45 to 64, and 11.40% who were 65 years of age or older. The median age was 36 years. For every 100 females, there were 96.80 males. For every 100 females age 18 and over, there were 94.80 males.

The median income for a household in the county was $36,192, and the median income for a family was $41,925. Males had a median income of $30,500 versus $21,656 for females. The per capita income for the county was $16,354. About 10.00% of families and 13.60% of the population were below the poverty line, including 14.70% of those under age 18 and 16.80% of those age 65 or over.

== Communities ==
Trimble County comprises two major towns, a couple of hamlets, and various small settlements. The 1877 Collins county history identified the towns of Bedford, Milton, Kingston, and Palmyra. Later authorities have differed from this.

The town of Bedford at the junction of United States Highways 421 and 42 is the county seat but was not its largest town until the middle 20th century. Its environs include Callis Grove, to the north, the site of an open-air tabernacle and campgrounds built by a Methodist church, retaining the name of the old Callis Grove post office run by Robert Edward Callis from June 1893 to September 1894 at the junction of what is now U.S. highway 42 and New Hope Road; and Bedford Springs, a set of springs popular before the U.S. Civil War.

The largest town until then was the port town of Milton, which was also the oldest town, at the junction of U.S. Highway 421 and Kentucky Route 36 and across the Ohio River from Madison, Indiana. It is widely believed that it used to have the name "Kingston" but in fact Kingston was a nearby, and not as old, village that Milton subsumed by an act of the Kentucky General Assembly in March 1872. In its vicinity are such things as Lookout Point and the erstwhile farm of Delia Webster.

Wise's Landing was a thriving port town in the 19th century that has dwindled down to a hamlet, whose identity is intermingled with Corn Creek, the name of one of the county's creeks that the Landing served and also (confusingly) the name of the Wise's Landing post office and thus the name given to the town on many maps over the years. It is at the mouth of Barebones Creek whose headwaters lie at Bedford and one of whose forks is Pryors Fork, sometimes identified on maps by its post office Trimble. Their collective environs include Payne Hollow, Preston Hollow (and an erstwhile Preston Plantation), and Spring Creek.

The rest of the county was in the 19th century a wide number of very small settlements, characterized as "just 'store-school-church' crossroads" by geographer Nancy Demaree. Before the school system was centralized and the advent of Rural Free Delivery in the 20th century there were twenty-odd post offices and a similar number of little schools throughout the county.

In the view of Robert M. Rennick, who made a lifetime study of places in Kentucky, outside the incorporated cities of Bedford and Milton only four more places with post offices have qualified as viable villages. They are Wises Landing and Corn Creek, counting as two for this purpose despite their historic conflation, Abbott/Abbotsford, which also may not actually have been separate places, and Providence.

It isn't known where exactly the Abbotsford post office, and the two later post offices named Abbot, actually were, as the location reports on the forms that were submitted by their postmasters to the government are subject to interpretation. Abbotsford post office from the name was at a "ford" somewhere on the Little Kentucky River, or possibly another watercourse, in the store and hotel of postmaster James Abbot. The first Abbot post office (1880-08-02 to June 1883) was in postmaster Madison Dunn's home north of the Little Kentucky River. The second Abbot post office (1886-04-06 to August 1906) was originally to be named Abbots Ford, but "Ford" was crossed out on the form, and was (according to postmaster William R. Morgan) one mile to the north-east of Middle Creek, five miles to the east of the Ohio River, and five miles south of Bedford. This is roughly the location of the name "Abbott" that is shown on 20th century state highway maps, although that is 4 1/2 miles (7.2 km) south-south-west of Bedford and 1/2 mile (0.80 km) west of the Little Kentucky River.

Robert M. Rennick characterized 19th century Ewingford as "a couple of stores and a sawmill at a ford", and 20th century Ewingford as "a small restaurant and a couple of dozen homes".

Providence used to be a village, purportedly with the original name "Hammels' Store" if the post office submission form for Hammel post office (1890-04-28 to February 1903) by storekeeper George M. Hammel is to be believed. It was actually identified on maps as Hammel until World War One, after which it was apparently renamed Providence after a local Baptist church.

The 1847 Collins county history identies Palmyra as a village with a store and a post office, however this is contradicted by records that show no Palmyra post office and only a post office named Winona at the location, later established by one James M. Turner on 1851-01-21. (The 1877 Collins history instead names Winona post office.) It could not have been called Palmyra as that would have clashed with an existing Palmyra postoffice in Simpson County. Nor was Palmyra the same as Vail, which actually was another post office whose lifetime overlapped that of Palmyra. Vail was rather the precursor of the post office named Monitor, so renamed because after an attempt to reëstablish it in 1903 after a hiatus, it, too, then clashed with an existing postoffice with an almost identical name in another county.

=== Cities ===
- Bedford (county seat)
- Milton

=== Unincorporated communities ===
- Monitor
- Mount Pleasant
- Providence
- Wises Landing

== Politics ==
United States presidential election results for Trimble County, Kentucky
Year	Republican		Democratic		Third party(ies)	
Year	No.	%	No.	%	No.	%
1912	163	10.96%	1,183	79.56%	141	9.48%
1916	259	16.15%	1,319	82.23%	26	1.62%
1920	361	14.83%	2,057	84.51%	16	0.66%
1924	335	16.61%	1,676	83.09%	6	0.30%
1928	573	30.24%	1,317	69.50%	5	0.26%
1932	257	10.92%	2,083	88.49%	14	0.59%
1936	271	13.91%	1,659	85.16%	18	0.92%
1940	242	11.23%	1,909	88.58%	4	0.19%
1944	264	11.95%	1,916	86.70%	30	1.36%
1948	194	9.72%	1,746	87.47%	56	2.81%
1952	370	16.52%	1,855	82.81%	15	0.67%
1956	506	21.90%	1,792	77.58%	12	0.52%
1960	743	31.89%	1,587	68.11%	0	0.00%
1964	292	13.41%	1,881	86.36%	5	0.23%
1968	511	25.98%	1,045	53.13%	411	20.89%
1972	935	54.61%	757	44.22%	20	1.17%
1976	517	24.47%	1,568	74.21%	28	1.33%
1980	824	34.45%	1,478	61.79%	90	3.76%
1984	1,389	55.78%	1,088	43.69%	13	0.52%
1988	1,083	44.39%	1,342	55.00%	15	0.61%
1992	789	29.99%	1,413	53.71%	429	16.31%
1996	999	38.90%	1,245	48.48%	324	12.62%
2000	1,837	59.62%	1,181	38.33%	63	2.04%
2004	2,332	61.53%	1,428	37.68%	30	0.79%
2008	2,239	58.74%	1,484	38.93%	89	2.33%
2012	2,133	60.20%	1,355	38.24%	55	1.55%
2016	2,771	72.96%	879	23.14%	148	3.90%
2020	3,227	74.70%	1,012	23.43%	81	1.88%
2024	3,283	77.27%	923	21.72%	43	1.01%

=== Elected officials ===
Elected officials as of January 3, 2025
U.S. House	Thomas Massie (R)	KY 4
Ky. Senate	Lindsey Tichenor (R)	6
Ky. House	Felicia Rabourn (R)	47

== See also ==
- Trimble County High School
- Louisville/Jefferson County–Elizabethtown–Bardstown, KY-IN Combined Statistical Area
- National Register of Historic Places listings in Trimble County, Kentucky

== Sources ==
- Rennick, Robert M. (2000). "Trimble County — Post Offices". County Histories of Kentucky (300). Morehead State University.
- Demaree, Nancy (May 1, 2000). Place, Disease and Mortality: Trimble County, Kentucky 1849–1894 (M.Sc. thesis). Western Kentucky University.
- Perrin, William Henry; Battle, J. H.; Kniffin, G. C. (1887). Kentucky, a History of the State (reprinted ed.). Southern Historical Press. ISBN 9780893081386.
- Collins, Lewis (1877). Collins, Richard H. (ed.). Collins' Historical Sketches of Kentucky: History of Kentucky. Louisville, KY: Collins.
- Works Progress Administration (1939). "Trimble County — General History". County Histories of Kentucky (301). Morehead State University.
