= Providence, Trimble County, Kentucky =

Unincorporated community in Kentucky, United States

Providence
- Unincorporated community
- Location within the state of Kentucky Providence (the United States)
- Coordinates: 38°34′28″N 85°13′16″W
- Country: United States
- State: Kentucky
- County: Trimble
- Elevation: 850 ft (260 m)
- Time zone: UTC-6 (Central (CST))
  - Summer (DST): UTC-5 (CST)
- GNIS feature ID: 508881

Providence is an unincorporated community located in Trimble County, Kentucky, United States.
