= Infiltration Art =

Infiltration Art is a branch of Intervention Art in which artists collaborate with institutions, communities, politicians, religions, museums and pop-culture figures outside of the traditional art world. Unlike other forms of intervention art, Infiltration Art seeks to create symbiotic relationships with the host institutions.

Artists whose work incorporates elements of infiltration include Banksy, Christian Cummings, Nikki S. Lee, Taryn Simon, Jeffrey Vallance, David Hildebrand Wilson, Fred Wilson, the Nationwide Museum Mascot Project (NWMMP).
