= Kika Thorne =

Canadian artist, filmmaker and curator

- Born: Toronto, Canada
- Known for: Artist, Filmmaker, Curator
- Website: www.kikathorne.net

Kika Thorne is a Canadian artist, filmmaker, curator, and activist. She was born in Toronto, where she is currently based.

== Life ==
Thorne graduated from the Ontario College of Art and Design (OCAD University) in Toronto, Ontario, in Media Production and Cultural Theory, and went on to receive her Master of Fine Arts (MFA) from the University of Victoria in Victoria, British Columbia.

== Artistic practice ==
In her early career, Thorne worked largely in film and moving image and also co-founded a feminist, cable television collective called SHE/TV (1991-1998) which aimed to mentor female filmmakers in producing experimental TV. Between 1996 and 2004, Thorne collaborated with fellow artist Adrian Blackwell to produce videos, installations and civic interventions. Thorne also worked as a curator for Vancouver's VIVO Media Arts Centre where she helped instigate a series of actions to express dissent around issues of the 2010 Winter Olympics in Vancouver.

With her multimedia/sculptural installations, Thorne works with the materials of mylar, elastic cord, rare earth magnets, plant-derived ink, aircraft cables, and other non-traditional art materials. Themes in her practice include an interest in geometry, physics, the visible spectrum, photosynthesis and social practice.

=== Select group exhibitions ===
- 2024: Gimme Shelter Saw Gallery, Ottawa, Canada
- 2023: What is Welcome? Helen and Morris Belkin Gallery, UBC, Vancouver, BC, Musqueam Territory

- 2020: Part of the Problem, Forum Expanded, Berlinale, Berlin, Germany
- 2018: A Salve of Sorts, WAAP / Vacation Gallery, New York, New York
- 2018: Dis[RE]Placement, Centre 3, Hamilton, Ontario

- 2015: Silva Part I: O Horizon, Nanaimo Art Gallery, Nanaimo, British Columbia
- 2015: Geometry of Knowing, SFU Gallery, Burnaby, British Columbia
- 2014: One Possible Arrangement, Katzman Contemporary, Toronto, Ontario
- 2013: Things’ Matter, Or Gallery, Vancouver, British Columbia
- 2013: I Thought There Were Limits, Justina M. Barnicke Gallery, Toronto, Ontario
- 2010: Western Front London Edition, No Soul for Sale Tate Modern, London, UK
- 2008: No Time to Lose, Peacock Visual Arts, Aberdeen, Scotland
- 2007: Gasoline Rainbows, Contemporary Art Gallery, Vancouver, British Columbia
- 2007: Street Scene, Murray Guy, New York City
- 2004-2011: e-flux video rental, e-flux, New York; Artprojx, London; Insa Art Space, Seoul; Portikus, Frankfurt; KW, Berlin; Manifesta, Amsterdam; The Moore Space, Miami; I Bienal de Canarias, Tenerife; Arthouse Jones Center, Austin; PiST///, Istanbul; unitednationsplaza, Berlin; Mucsarnok, Budapest; Location Project, Antwerp; Extra City Center, Antwerp; 9th Lyon Biennial, Lyon; Centre Culturel Suisse de Paris, Paris; Carpenter Center, Boston; the building, Berlin; Fundação Calouste Gulbenkian, Lisbon; 41 Salòn Nacional, Cali; Fondazione Giuliani per l’arte contemporanea, Rome; MG+MSUM, Ljubljana.
- 2003: Zones, Art Gallery of Hamilton, Hamilton, Ontario
- 2001: The Lefty Show, A Space, Toronto, Ontario
- 2001: Substitute City, The Power Plant, Toronto, Ontario

=== Solo exhibitions ===
- 2023: Not for sale! Architects Against Housing Alienation, Venice Biennale of Architecture, Canada pavilion, Venice

• 2019: The Sun, CSA Space, Vancouver, British Columbia

- 2018: Tax Gentrification! The Public Studio, Toronto, Ontario
- 2015: The Question of a Hunch, The Work of Wind, Nuit Blanche, Toronto, Ontario
- 2014: Multiplicity of the Singularity, Art Gallery of Greater Victoria, Victoria, British Columbia
- 2012: The Wildcraft, Art Gallery of Windsor, Windsor, Ontario

- 2012: medicine, G Gallery, Toronto, Ontario

- 2011: a bar IST a garden IST a cafe IST a reading room , Berlinale Forum Expanded, Berlin, Germany
- 2010: Singularity, Galerie ZK, Berlin, Germany

- 2004: Dehomogenised, LRT Commission, Artcity, Calgary
- 2001: Kika Thorne in collaboration, Unit Pitt, Vancouver, BC,

=== Film screenings ===
- 2004: VS., Latvian House, Toronto, Ontario
- 2003: Kika Thorne, The Disorder of Things, Kino Arsenal, Berlin, and Kino Bremen, Bremen, Germany
- 2000: Pleasure Dome's 10th Anniversary Screening, CineCycle, Toronto, Ontario
- 1997: New Toronto Works Show, CineCycle, Toronto, Ontario
- 1995: Puberty Film Show, CineCycle, Toronto, Ontario

=== Collective work/civic interventions ===
- 2018–present: Gentrification Tax, Gentrification Tax Action, Toronto, Ontario
- 2010: SAFE ASSEMBLY (curated), VIVO Media Arts Centre, Vancouver, British Columbia
- 2003: ambience for a future city, Anarchist Free School, Toronto, Ontario
- 1997: Sod Roll for Shawn Keegan, The April Group, Toronto, Ontario
- 1997: Untitled (mattresses), The February Group, Toronto, Ontario
- 1996: Untitled (inflatable), The October Group, Toronto, Ontario

== Honours ==
- 1997: Winner Best Canadian Video Images Film and Video Festival
