= Dare-Dare (artist-run centre) =

DARE-DARE
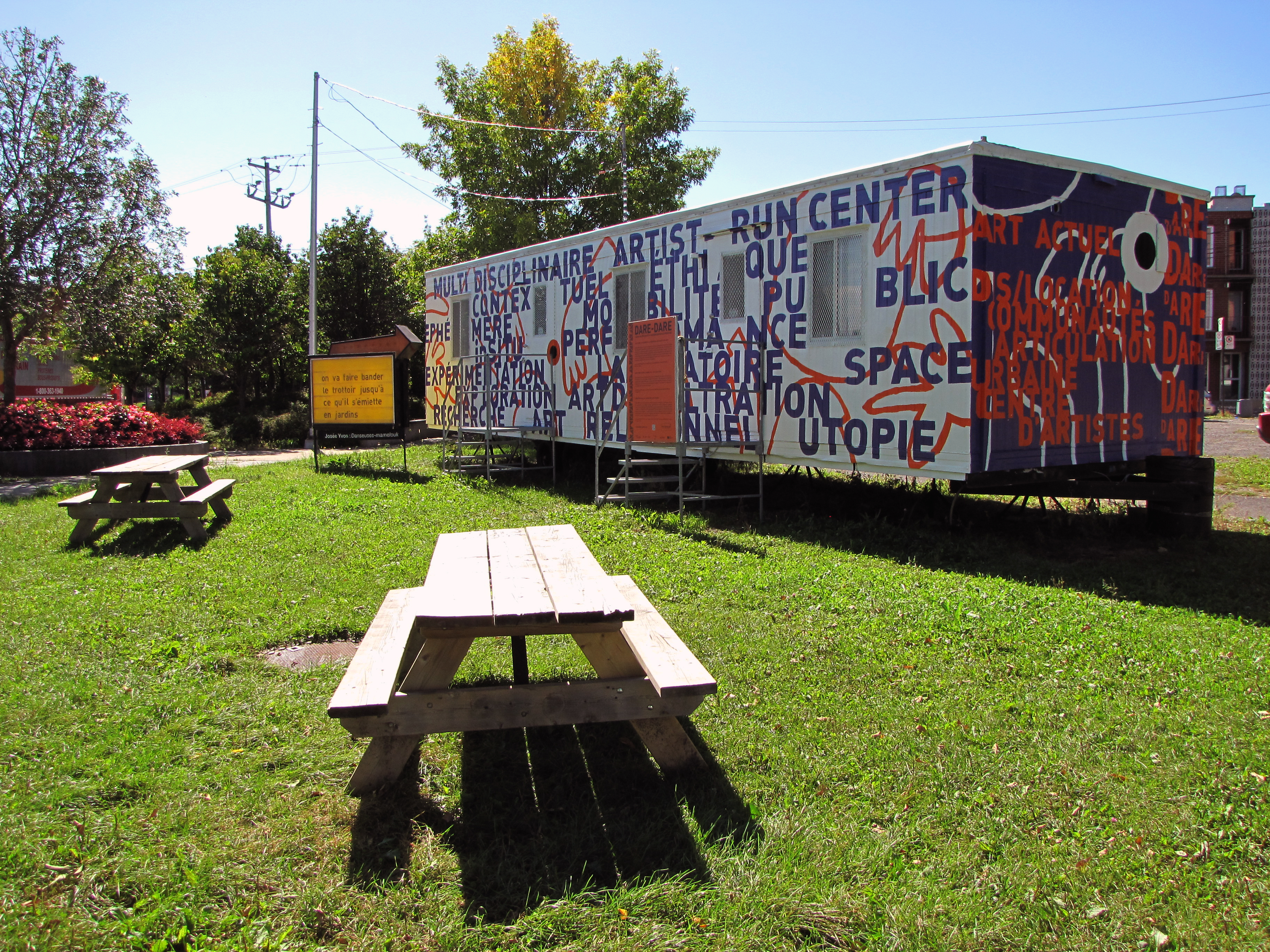
- Established: 1985
- Location: Montreal
- Coordinates: 45°28′49″N 73°34′40″W
- Website: www.dare-dare.org

Dare-Dare, stylized DARE-DARE, is an artist-run center and a nonprofit organization located in Montreal. It was founded by Sylvie Cotton and Claire Bourque. Its offices are located in a construction trailer, decorated by artists and stationed in different districts (mostly in parks) on the island of Montreal. The name given by the center to these successive temporary locations is Dis/location: urban articulation project.

DARE-DARE is exclusively dedicated to the production and presentation of public art, although this was not always the case since its foundation. Its activities consist of hosting the work of selected artists following an annual call for applications, organizing openings (mostly outdoor), outdoor screenings, day camps and collaborations with other arts organizations, like the Viva! Art Action, an international action art and performance biennale.

The main fundraising activity of DARE-DARE consists of an annual sale of passports used for the collection of artistic interventions in different points of the city.

The center is active throughout the whole year and its actions are divided into 7 parts (public intervention, critical space, public writing, transmission, outreach, halt and special projects).

== History ==
In 1985, as part of the International Youth Year, Sylvie Cotton and Claire Bourque founded the art gallery DARE-DARE. They then gave a first three-part mandate to the center: to allow young artists to exhibit and sell their works, to offer a transitional venue to artists before entering the established galleries, and finally, to educate the general population (and especially the local people) on current art practices.

Located at this time on Laurier Street, the center presented a new exhibition every two weeks, totalling 28 artists of different disciplines in the first year.

With the initial aim of sensitizing new audiences, the center has supported and still supports the efforts of artists who wish to meet other audiences and compare their practice with a specific context different from that of the workshop or the gallery. 8 The center is at the origin of many events: the Festival des musiciennes innovatrices (1986), Art et littérature féministe (1988), Dansité (1988), 11 artistes dans leurs quartiers (1990), Les Femmes l’Art et la Joie (as part of the Center's fifth anniversary in 1990) and Les Cracheurs d'images (1993). DARE-DARE is also one of the founding centers of VIVA! Art Action (first edition in 2006).

From its first premises in an old barber shop at 1320 Laurier Street East, the center has changed its address more than four times, which means that travel is an integral part of its history. In 1987, the center was located at 4060 Saint-Laurent Boulevard, in 1990 at 279 Sherbrooke West and in the summer of 1996 at 460 Sainte-Catherine Ouest, increasingly closer to the business center of Montreal.

Since 2004, DARE-DARE is pursuing its urban articulation project called Dis/location. The project involves relocating the offices of the center, newly housed in a construction trailer, through various districts of the city of Montreal.

=== Chronology ===
- 1985 : Foundation as an NPO.
- 1990 : Designation as artist-run center^{,}.
- 1990-2004 : Gallery project diffusion (fixed space).
- 2004 : Transition from a fixed gallery space to a succession of mobile locations (Dis / location).
- 2004-2017 : Presentation of public art projects.
- 2011 : Temporary export of the center to Detroit and Tijuana.
- 2017 : Creation of the HALTE (Reference and reflection pavilion on art in the public space).

== Mission ==
To explore, question and evolve contemporary art practices, spaces and modes of dissemination and to promote their democratization and accessibility.

== Mandate ==
DARE-DARE supports the research and development of innovative practices by artists, be they just starting out or seasoned professionals. The artist centre has had a long-standing interest in exploring and diversifying art work and intervention design processes, forms of expression and modes of presentation within diverse contexts not traditionally intended for art. The artist centre encourages collaboration with various cultural and/or community organizations, as well as with partners who are not within the art field. DARE-DARE has as its objective to promote education, understanding and appreciation of contemporary art at a local, national and international level. This is achieved throughout a range of activities including: research, creation, production, dissemination, documentation, publishing, workshops, as well as artist discussions and forums.

== Activities ==
The Center's activities, following an annual call for projects, are also grouped under a specific theme that also changes each year. They are available in a series of different parts simultaneously.

=== Part 1 - Public space interventions ===
Project presented in the public spaces that surround the current location of the center.

=== Part 2 - Critical space ===
Residency of theoretical research and writing of one to two months which concludes with a public presentation and the printing of a pamphlet.

=== Part 3 - Public writings ===
Literary/poetic research residency exhibited in a textual form on an outdoor advertising light box near the center^{,}.

=== Special projects ===
Special projects (mainly collaborations between the center and other artists and/or organizations) may manifest themselves spontaneously and take a form that is not related to any of the previous parts.

== Dis/location ==
From 2004, the location of the artist-run center changes on an ad hoc basis.

- Marché Atwater (2015- )
- Esplanade Métro Saint-Laurent (2012-2015) at the quartier des spectacles^{,}.
- Parc Walter Stewart (2009-2012)
- Détroit and Tijuana (2011)
- Cabot square (2008-2009)
- Parc sans nom (2006-2008)
- Viger square (2004-2006)

== Awards ==
- 2014 Gala des arts visuels - Best event or exhibition in an artist-run center
- 2010 Grafika Award - Printed media (book) DIS / LOCATION I (design: Denis Rioux)

== Publications ==
- Orbitae : Dare-Dare 1996-1997
- Mobilité et Résonances
- Mémoire vive + L’algèbre d’Ariane
- Dis/location 1 : projet d'articulation urbaine : Viger square
- Dis/location 2 : projet d'articulation urbaine : le parc sans nom
- 3 DIS/LOCATIONs : projet d'articulation urbaine : Cabot square / Walter-Stewart park / Quartier des spectacles
- Vers libres : Cinq ans d'écritures publiques sur l'enseigne lumineuse de DARE-DARE

== Attachments ==
=== Organizations whose center is a member ===
- (in French and English) RCAAQ (Réseau des Centres d'artistes autogérés du Québec)
- (in French and English) RAIQ (Regroupement des Arts Interdisciplinaires du Québec)

=== External links ===
- (in French, English, and Spanish) Official site
