= Monitor, Kentucky =

Unincorporated community in Kentucky, United States

Monitor
- Unincorporated community
- Location within the state of Kentucky Monitor (the United States)
- Coordinates: 38°39′17″N 85°15′59″W
- Country: United States
- State: Kentucky
- County: Trimble
- Elevation: 919 ft (280 m)
- Time zone: UTC-6 (Central (CST))
  - Summer (DST): UTC-5 (CST)
- GNIS feature ID: 508625

Monitor is an unincorporated community located in Trimble County, Kentucky, United States. Monitor was once a vibrant community, with a school, post office, general store, and black smith in the early 1900s.
