= Emil Knudsen =

- Emil Knudsen, 1914
- Known for: Psychic

Emil Marius Knudsen (9 April 1872 – 13 August 1956) was a Norwegian psychic.
