= Monitoring =

Monitoring may refer to:

== Science and technology ==
=== Biology and healthcare ===
- Monitoring (medicine), the observation of a disease, condition or one or several medical parameters over time
- Baby monitoring
- Biomonitoring, of toxic chemical compounds, elements, or their metabolites, in biological substances
- Fetal monitoring in childbirth
- Heart rate monitoring
- Intraoperative neurophysiological monitoring
- Monitoring in clinical trials, oversight and administrative efforts that monitor a participant's health during a clinical trial
- Self-monitoring, a psychological term meaning awareness of what one knows

=== Computing ===
- Application performance management, also called application performance monitoring, monitoring and management of performance and availability of software applications
- Event monitoring, process of collecting, analyzing, and signaling event occurrences to subscribers such as operating system processes, active database rules as well as human operators
- Business transaction management, also called business transaction monitoring, managing information technology from a business transaction perspective
- Network monitoring, systems that constantly monitors a computer network for slow or failing components and that notifies the network administrator
- System monitoring, a process within a distributed system for collecting and storing state data
- User activity monitoring, the process of recording user input
- Website monitoring, the process of testing and verifying that end-users can interact with a website or web application as expected

=== Environmental science ===
- Environmental monitoring, processes and activities that characterise and monitor the quality of the environment
- Participatory monitoring, monitoring of natural resources and biodiversity by local people

=== Other uses in science and technology ===
- Condition monitoring, a process for tracking parameters in industrial equipment
- Cure monitoring, for composite materials manufacturing
- Deformation monitoring, measurement and tracking of the alteration in the shape or dimensions of an object as a result of stresses
- Energy monitoring and targeting, an energy efficiency technique

== Other uses ==
- Election monitoring, the observation of an election by one or more independent parties
- Futures monitoring, evaluation of events, as they occur or just afterward
- Media monitoring service, providing clients with copies of media content, which is of specific interest
- Monitoring and evaluation, process that helps improve performance and achieve results in project management
- Wildlife Enforcement Monitoring System (WEMS) Initiative
- "Monitoring", a 2024 song by Deco*27 featuring virtual vocalist Hatsune Miku

== See also ==
- Monitor (disambiguation)
- Surveillance, the monitoring or observation of the behaviour or communications of individuals or groups
