= Saint Monitor =

Saint of the Catholic Church

Bishop
- Died: c. 490; Orléans
- Venerated in: Catholic Church
- Feast: November 10

Saint Monitor, also known as Saint Moniteur (died c. 490), was the twelfth Bishop of Orléans in France and is recognized as a Catholic saint.

Monitor became the bishop of Orléans around 472. His feast day is celebrated on November 10.

== See also ==
- veneration of saints
- prayer for intercession of saints
- List of Catholic saints
