= Tanya Mars =

American-Canadian artist (born 1948)

- Born: Tanya Ann Marshall; 1948 (age 77–78); Monroe, Michigan, U.S.
- Education: University of Michigan
- Known for: Multidisciplinary performance artist, video artist, feminist artist
- Website: tanyamars.com

Tanya Mars (born 1948) is a performance and video artist based in Toronto, Ontario, Canada.

== Biography ==
Mars was born in Monroe, Michigan in 1948, and has lived in Canada since 1967. She was married once, and has one daughter. Mars is also known as Tanya Rosenberg.

She was educated at the University of Michigan, Ann Arbor, Sir George Williams University in Montreal, and at Loyola College, Montreal (now incorporated into Concordia University).

Mars currently teaches performance art and video in the Department of Arts, Culture and Media in the University of Toronto Scarborough and is part of the graduate faculty of the Master of Visual Studies Program at the University of Toronto.

== Work ==
Tanya Mars has been an active member of the Canadian arts scene, creating performance art and video works since 1974. She has performed widely across Canada, in Valparaiso, Chile, Mexico City, Sweden, France and Helsinki. Her work draws on feminist discourse and imagery, and often uses humour and satire.

Mars is a founding member of and director of Powerhouse Galleries (La Centrale) in Montreal, the first women's art gallery in Canada. She was the editor of Parallelogramme magazine from 1977 to 1989, and very active in The Association of National Non-Profit Artist-run Centres for 15 years. During the 1970s and 1980s, Mars was a member and secretary of The Association of National Non-Profit Artist-Run Centres, a national lobby group for artist-run centres (1976–1989). She is a past president and member of FADO, a non-profit artist-run centre for performance art based in Toronto, Canada. Currently, she is also a member of the 7a*11d Collective that produces a bi-annual International Festival of Performance Art in Toronto.

Tyranny of Bliss took place in 2004 in Toronto which had audiences travel by car to 14 tableaux representing the seven heavenly virtues and seven deadly sins.

With Johanna Householder, Mars co-edited the 2004 anthology Caught in the Act: An Anthology of Performance Art by Canadian Women. A second volume, also co-edited by Mars and Householder, entitled More Caught in the Act: An Anthology of Performance Art by Canadian Women was published in 2016.

Mars' performance work received in-depth treatment in a 2008 critical anthology edited by Paul Couillard.

=== Videography ===
- The Granny Suites, Part 1: Happy Birthday to You - 2006
- 7 Deadly Sins/ 7 Deadly Virtues - 2004
- Hot! - 1998
- Doom - 1996
- Bronco's Kiss - 1996
- Mz. Frankenstein - 1993
- End of Nature, The - 1991
- PURE HELL - 1990
- Pure Sin - 1990
- Pure Nonsense - 1987
- Pure Sin - 1986
- Pure Virtue - 1985
- 24 Postcards of Rage: No Man's Land - 1983 (with Rina Fraticelli)
- Picnic In The Drift - 1981

=== Performance Art ===
- Good Buy!, 2018
- Crone, 2017 (FADO, part of MonoMyths curated by Shannon Cochrane and Jess Dobkin)
- Homage to the City of Women: Leaves of Gold, 2016
- Rare Parity, 2015
- The Artist is A Present, 2015
- Vanitas for an Arctic Landscape, 2015
- Tyranny of Bliss, 2004
- Performance Art Starter Kit, 2000
- Pure Virtue, 1984
- Pure Sin, 1987
- Pure Nonsense, 1987
- Pure Hell, 1990
- Fat - 1978 (Thirteen Jackies)
- All Alone Am I - 1977 (Thirteen Jackies)
- Super Secretary - 1977
- Tanya-in-the-Box - 1976
- Codpieces: phallic paraphernalia - 1974

== Awards ==
- 1981 - Received Chalmers Award for innovative collaboration in the performing arts for Picnic in the Drift with Rina Fraticelli.
- 2005 - Awarded "Artist of the Year," Untitled Arts Awards, Toronto.
- 2008 - Awarded Governor General's Award in Visual and Media Arts.

== Residencies ==
- 1984 - Western Front in Vancouver, British Columbia. Presented Pure Virtue.
- 1993 - Western Front in Vancouver, British Columbia. Presented Mz Frankenstein with Judy Radul and Brice Canyon as part of six-week residency, curated by Kate Craig.
- 2008 - Lilith Performance Studio in Malmö, Sweden. Presented In Dulci Jubilo curated by Elin Lundgren and Petter Pettersson.
- 2008 - The Cité internationale des arts in Paris, International Artist in Residence.
