= Pfeiffer =

Pfeiffer may refer to:

== Medicine ==
- Pfeiffer syndrome, a rare genetic disorder characterized by the premature fusion of certain bones of the skull
- Infectious mononucleosis, also known as the kissing disease, or Pfeiffer's disease

== Organizations ==
- Pfeiffer University, Misenheimer, North Carolina, U.S.
- Carl A. Pfeiffer, a German piano manufacturer
- Pfeiffer Vacuum, a German manufacturer of vacuum pumps

== Places ==
- Pfeiffer, Arkansas, U.S.
- Pfeiffer, Ohio, U.S.
- Pfeiffer Lake, Minnesota, U.S.
- Pfeiffer Big Sur State Park
- Julia Pfeiffer Burns State Park

== Other ==
- Pfeiffer (surname)
- Pfeiffer effect, an optical phenomenon

== See also ==
- Pfeiffer House (disambiguation)
- Pfeifer, a surname
- Pfeffer, a surname
