= Foraker =

Foraker may refer to:

== Places ==
- Mount Foraker, Alaska
- Foraker, Indiana, an unincorporated community
- Foraker, Kentucky, an unincorporated community
- Foraker, Ohio, an unincorporated community
- Foraker, Oklahoma, a town

== Other uses ==
- Foraker (surname)
- Foraker Act, United States federal law
- Foraker Formation, a geologic formation of limestone and shale in Nebraska, Kansas, and Oklahoma
