= Hardin County, Ohio =

County in Ohio, United States

- County
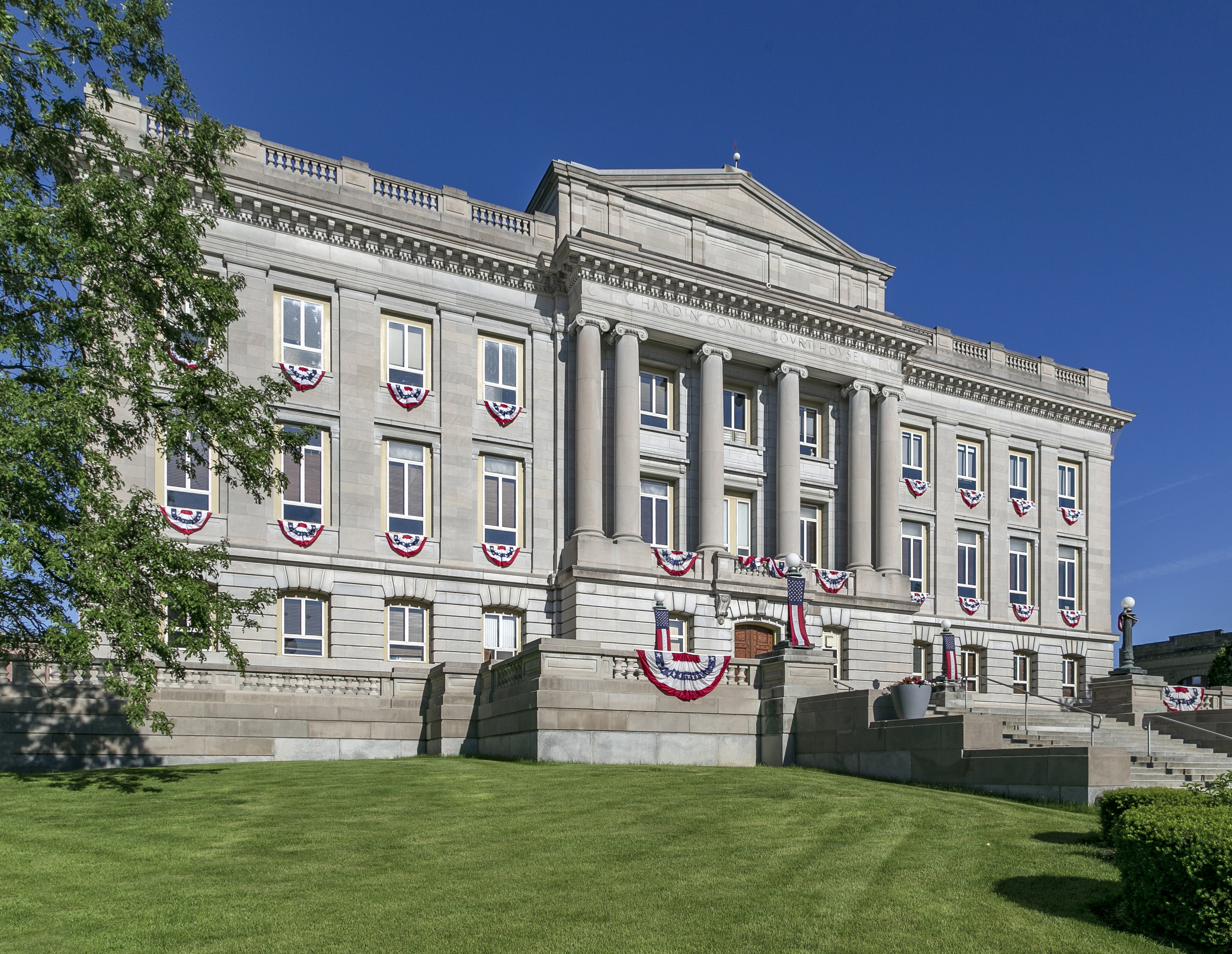
- Hardin County Courthouse

- Flag Seal

- Location within the U.S. state of Ohio
- Coordinates: 40°40′N 83°40′W
- Country: United States
- State: Ohio
- Founded: March 1, 1833
- Named for: John Hardin
- Seat: Kenton
- Largest city: Kenton

Area
  - Total: 471 sq mi (1,220 km^{2})
  - Land: 470 sq mi (1,200 km^{2})
  - Water: 0.2 sq mi (0.52 km^{2}) 0.1%

Population (2020)
  - Total: 30,696
  - Estimate (2025): 30,072 ▼
  - Density: 64/sq mi (25/km^{2})
- Time zone: UTC−5 (Eastern)
  - Summer (DST): UTC−4 (EDT)
- Congressional district: 4th
- Website: hardincountyohio.gov

Hardin County is a county located in the west central portion of the U.S. state of Ohio. As of the 2020 census, the population was 30,696. Its county seat and largest city is Kenton. The county was created in 1820 and later organized in 1833. It is named for John Hardin, an officer in the American Revolution.

== Geography ==
According to the U.S. Census Bureau, the county has a total area of 471 square miles (1,220 km^{2}), of which 470 square miles (1,200 km^{2}) is land and 0.2 square miles (0.52 km^{2}) (0.1%) is water.

=== Adjacent counties ===
- Hancock County (north)
- Wyandot County (northeast)
- Marion County (east)
- Union County (southeast)
- Logan County (south)
- Auglaize County (southwest)
- Allen County (northwest)

== Demographics ==
Historical population
Census	Pop.	Note	%±
1820	22		—
1830	210		854.5%
1840	4,598		2,089.5%
1850	8,251		79.4%
1860	13,570		64.5%
1870	18,714		37.9%
1880	27,023		44.4%
1890	28,939		7.1%
1900	31,187		7.8%
1910	30,407		−2.5%
1920	29,167		−4.1%
1930	27,635		−5.3%
1940	27,061		−2.1%
1950	28,673		6.0%
1960	29,633		3.3%
1970	30,813		4.0%
1980	32,719		6.2%
1990	31,111		−4.9%
2000	31,945		2.7%
2010	32,058		0.4%
2020	30,696		−4.2%
2025 (est.)	30,072	▼	−2.0%
U.S. Decennial Census; 1790-1960 1900-1990; 1990-2000 2020 2025

=== 2020 census ===
As of the 2020 census, the county had a population of 30,696. The median age was 37.2 years, with 23.0% of residents under the age of 18 and 17.2% aged 65 years or older. For every 100 females there were 99.5 males, and for every 100 females age 18 and over there were 97.6 males age 18 and over.

As of the 2020 census, the racial makeup of the county was 93.3% White, 0.9% Black or African American, 0.2% American Indian and Alaska Native, 0.6% Asian, <0.1% Native Hawaiian and Pacific Islander, 1.0% from some other race, and 4.0% from two or more races. Hispanic or Latino residents of any race comprised 2.3% of the population.

As of the 2020 census, 43.6% of residents lived in urban areas, while 56.4% lived in rural areas.

As of the 2020 census, there were 11,638 households in the county, of which 30.0% had children under the age of 18 living in them. Of all households, 48.3% were married-couple households, 19.6% were households with a male householder and no spouse or partner present, and 24.5% were households with a female householder and no spouse or partner present. About 28.3% of all households were made up of individuals and 13.0% had someone living alone who was 65 years of age or older.

As of the 2020 census, there were 12,883 housing units, of which 9.7% were vacant. Among occupied housing units, 71.3% were owner-occupied and 28.7% were renter-occupied. The homeowner vacancy rate was 1.8% and the rental vacancy rate was 10.0%.

=== Racial and ethnic composition ===
Hardin County, Ohio – Racial and ethnic composition Note: the US Census treats Hispanic/Latino as an ethnic category. This table excludes Latinos from the racial categories and assigns them to a separate category. Hispanics/Latinos may be of any race.
Race / Ethnicity (NH = Non-Hispanic)	Pop 1980	Pop 1990	Pop 2000	Pop 2010	Pop 2020	% 1980	% 1990	% 2000	% 2010	% 2020
White alone (NH)	32,268	30,555	31,009	30,774	28,389	98.62%	98.21%	97.07%	95.99%	92.48%
Black or African American alone (NH)	204	232	220	255	256	0.62%	0.75%	0.69%	0.80%	0.83%
Native American or Alaska Native alone (NH)	25	57	74	44	48	0.08%	0.18%	0.23%	0.14%	0.16%
Asian alone (NH)	60	112	138	180	169	0.18%	0.36%	0.43%	0.56%	0.55%
Native Hawaiian or Pacific Islander alone (NH)	x	x	1	3	8	x	x	0.00%	0.01%	0.03%
Other race alone (NH)	32	10	12	19	69	0.10%	0.03%	0.04%	0.06%	0.22%
Mixed race or Multiracial (NH)	x	x	243	376	1,060	x	x	0.76%	1.17%	3.45%
Hispanic or Latino (any race)	130	145	248	407	697	0.40%	0.47%	0.78%	1.27%	2.27%
Total	32,719	31,111	31,945	32,058	30,696	100.00%	100.00%	100.00%	100.00%	100.00%

=== 2010 census ===
As of the 2010 United States census, there were 32,058 people, 11,762 households, and 7,950 families living in the county. The population density was 68.1 inhabitants per square mile (26.3/km^{2}). There were 13,100 housing units at an average density of 27.8 per square mile (10.7/km^{2}). The racial makeup of the county was 96.7% white, 0.8% black or African American, 0.6% Asian, 0.2% American Indian, 0.5% from other races, and 1.3% from two or more races. Those of Hispanic or Latino origin made up 1.3% of the population. In terms of ancestry, 33.0% were German, 15.1% were Irish, 13.2% were American, and 9.6% were English.

Of the 11,762 households, 32.3% had children under the age of 18 living with them, 52.4% were married couples living together, 10.1% had a female householder with no husband present, 32.4% were non-families, and 26.7% of all households were made up of individuals. The average household size was 2.53 and the average family size was 3.05. The median age was 34.7 years.

The median income for a household in the county was $41,343 and the median income for a family was $55,274. Males had a median income of $41,191 versus $32,313 for females. The per capita income for the county was $19,100. About 9.6% of families and 16.2% of the population were below the poverty line, including 18.5% of those under age 18 and 6.0% of those age 65 or over.

=== 2000 census ===
At the 2000 census, there were 31,945 people, 11,963 households and 8,134 families living in the county. The population density was 68 people per square mile (26 people/km^{2}). There were 12,907 housing units at an average density of 27 units per square mile (10/km^{2}). The racial makeup of the county was 97.54% White, 0.70% Black or African American, 0.25% Native American, 0.43% Asian, 0.23% from other races, and 0.85% from two or more races. 0.78% of the population were Hispanic or Latino of any race. 96.9% spoke English and 1.4% German as their first language.

There were 11,963 households, of which 31.40% had children under the age of 18 living with them, 55.00% were married couples living together, 8.90% had a female householder with no husband present, and 32.00% were non-families. 26.50% of all households were made up of individuals, and 10.80% had someone living alone who was 65 years of age or older. The average household size was 2.51 and the average family size was 3.03.

24.30% of the population were under the age of 18, 15.40% from 18 to 24, 26.00% from 25 to 44, 21.30% from 45 to 64, and 12.90% who were 65 years of age or older. The median age was 33 years. For every 100 females there were 95.90 males. For every 100 females age 18 and over, there were 92.70 males.

The median household income was $34,440 and the median family income was $42,395. Males had a median income of $33,393 compared with $21,695 for females. The per capita income for the county was $16,200. About 8.90% of families and 13.20% of the population were below the poverty line, including 15.20% of those under age 18 and 11.90% of those age 65 or over.

== Politics ==
Hardin County is a Republican Party stronghold. The last Democrat to win the county was Lyndon B. Johnson in his 1964 landslide. The county is currently represented by Robert McColley in the Ohio Senate, and Ty Mathews in the Ohio House of Representatives. Federally, the county is drawn into Ohio's 4th Congressional District, represented by Jim Jordan.

United States presidential election results for Hardin County, Ohio
Year	Republican		Democratic		Third party(ies)	
Year	No.	%	No.	%	No.	%
1856	1,091	53.09%	882	42.92%	82	3.99%
1860	1,432	52.72%	1,198	44.11%	86	3.17%
1864	1,640	52.92%	1,459	47.08%	0	0.00%
1868	1,884	51.62%	1,766	48.38%	0	0.00%
1872	2,238	53.08%	1,970	46.73%	8	0.19%
1876	2,830	50.98%	2,702	48.68%	19	0.34%
1880	3,472	53.11%	3,032	46.38%	33	0.50%
1884	3,647	51.09%	3,373	47.25%	119	1.67%
1888	3,611	49.54%	3,339	45.81%	339	4.65%
1892	3,515	47.71%	3,483	47.28%	369	5.01%
1896	4,276	49.50%	4,247	49.16%	116	1.34%
1900	4,389	50.07%	4,190	47.80%	187	2.13%
1904	4,736	57.36%	3,096	37.50%	424	5.14%
1908	4,444	50.35%	4,164	47.17%	219	2.48%
1912	2,775	33.22%	3,912	46.83%	1,667	19.95%
1916	4,119	48.08%	4,304	50.24%	144	1.68%
1920	8,071	57.64%	5,817	41.54%	115	0.82%
1924	7,112	53.66%	5,523	41.67%	619	4.67%
1928	8,137	60.20%	5,306	39.25%	74	0.55%
1932	7,215	44.86%	8,717	54.20%	152	0.95%
1936	7,631	46.86%	8,441	51.84%	211	1.30%
1940	9,192	58.40%	6,547	41.60%	0	0.00%
1944	8,566	62.55%	5,128	37.45%	0	0.00%
1948	7,441	57.38%	5,474	42.21%	52	0.40%
1952	9,235	64.58%	5,064	35.42%	0	0.00%
1956	9,049	66.51%	4,556	33.49%	0	0.00%
1960	9,042	64.41%	4,996	35.59%	0	0.00%
1964	5,679	43.67%	7,324	56.33%	0	0.00%
1968	6,963	53.82%	4,180	32.31%	1,794	13.87%
1972	8,713	69.14%	3,535	28.05%	354	2.81%
1976	6,076	54.86%	4,650	41.99%	349	3.15%
1980	7,457	61.51%	3,863	31.87%	803	6.62%
1984	8,722	69.11%	3,813	30.21%	85	0.67%
1988	7,291	62.82%	4,145	35.71%	170	1.46%
1992	5,851	44.28%	4,364	33.02%	3,000	22.70%
1996	5,506	46.36%	4,930	41.51%	1,440	12.13%
2000	7,124	59.03%	4,557	37.76%	387	3.21%
2004	8,441	63.03%	4,891	36.52%	60	0.45%
2008	7,749	58.93%	5,013	38.12%	387	2.94%
2012	7,489	60.06%	4,619	37.04%	362	2.90%
2016	8,717	70.56%	2,920	23.64%	717	5.80%
2020	9,949	75.10%	3,062	23.11%	236	1.78%
2024	9,911	76.78%	2,863	22.18%	134	1.04%

United States Senate election results for Hardin County, Ohio1
Year	Republican		Democratic		Third party(ies)	
Year	No.	%	No.	%	No.	%
2024	8,839	69.10%	3,367	26.32%	585	4.57%

== Media ==
Two newspapers, the daily The Kenton Times of Kenton and the weekly The Ada Herald of Ada, operate in Hardin County.

Radio stations include WKTN of Kenton and WOHA of Ada, a radio station owned by Holy Family Communications.

WOCB-LP TV48 is a local Christian television station in downtown Kenton covering channels 39.1-39.4.

== Transportation ==
=== Airports ===
Ada Airport (FAA LID: 0D7) is a privately owned, public-use airport located one nautical mile (1.85 km) northwest of the central business district of Ada, a village in Hardin County.

Hardin County Airport (FAA LID: I95) is the largest paved facility and is located 3 miles south of Kenton, Ohio on CR 135. The runway is 4,803 feet long at an elevation of 1,030 feet. Maintenance, fuel and storage are available.

=== Major highways ===
- US 68
- SR 31
- SR 37
- SR 53
- SR 67
- SR 117
- SR 195
- SR 235
- SR 273
- SR 292
- SR 309
- SR 385

== Communities ==
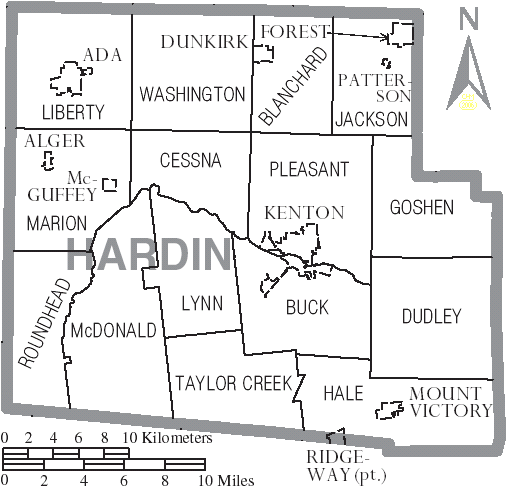
Map of Hardin County, Ohio with Municipal and Township Labels

=== City ===
- Kenton (county seat)

=== Villages ===
- Ada
- Alger
- Dunkirk
- Forest
- McGuffey
- Mount Victory
- Patterson
- Ridgeway

=== Townships ===
- Blanchard
- Buck
- Cessna
- Dudley
- Goshen
- Hale
- Jackson
- Liberty
- Lynn
- Marion
- McDonald
- Pleasant
- Roundhead
- Taylor Creek
- Washington

=== Census-designated place ===
- Dola

=== Unincorporated communities ===
- Blanchard
- Foraker
- Grant
- Grassy Point
- Hepburn
- Holden
- Huntersville
- Jumbo
- Jump
- Maysville
- Mentzer
- Pfeiffer
- Roundhead
- Silver Creek
- Yelverton

== Notable people ==
- Nehemiah Green, fourth governor of Kansas

From Kenton

- James S. Robinson, Civil War General and Secretary of State for Ohio
- John R. Goodin, Democratic congressman from Kansas
- William Lawrence, Republican congressman involved with the attempt to impeach Andrew Johnson
- Jacob Parrott, first recipient of the Medal of Honor
- Paul Robinson, creator of the long-running Etta Kett comic strip for King Features Syndicate

From Ada

- Rollo May, an American existential psychologist
- Lee Tressel, football coach, father of former Ohio State University football coach Jim Tressel
- John Berton, award-winning computer graphics animator and visual effects supervisor.
- Carey Orr, cartoonist.

From Alger

- Ray Brown — Homestead Grays pitcher

From Dunkirk

- Willard Rhodes, ethnomusicologist (1901–1992)
- Dean Pees, NFL coach

== See also ==
- National Register of Historic Places listings in Hardin County, Ohio
