= George Herzog (ethnomusicologist) =

American anthropologist (1901-1983)

- Born: December 11, 1901; Budapest, Austria-Hungary
- Died: November 4, 1983 (aged 81); Indianapolis, Indiana, U.S.
- Education: Budapest Music Academy; Hochschule für Musik; Columbia University
- Employer: Indiana University Bloomington
- Known for: Study of Native American language, music and anthropology.

Academic background
- Thesis: A comparison of Pueblo and Pima musical styles (1938)

George Herzog (December 11, 1901 – November 4, 1983) was an American anthropologist, folklorist, musicologist, and ethnomusicologist.

== Life ==
Georg Herzog studied at the Budapest Music Academy from 1917 to 1919, and at the Hochschule für Musik in Charlottenburg. Starting in 1921, he assisted Carl Stumpf and Erich Moritz von Hornbostel in the Berliner Phonogramm-Archiv. In 1925, he emigrated to the United States, where he received a postgraduate degree in anthropology from Columbia University. While there, he studied with Franz Boas, Edward Sapir and Ruth Benedict. In 1930/31 he went on a research trip to Liberia, where he recorded, on behalf of Sapir, the language and folk music of the Jabo people. He received a Guggenheim Fellowship in 1935 (and 1947). Through field research, he wrote his doctoral thesis in 1937 A comparison of Pueblo and Pima musical styles which made him one of the fore-most authoritative scholars for American Indian music. He taught and conducted research at the University of Chicago, Yale University and Columbia University. During World War II, he worked in the US Army in Military Intelligence.

Herzog was a professor of Anthropology at Indiana University Bloomington from 1948 to 1958 where he formally established the Archives of Traditional Music which he had begun collecting in 1936 while he was at Columbia University. His establishing of a formal sound recording archive, in the model of the Berliner Phonogramm-Archiv, shaped the nascent field of ethnomusicology by centering the preservation of sound recordings as a crucial methodological approach in the discipline. This legacy was carried forward by his student Bruno Nettl who continued the work of bring together ethnology and cultural anthropology with historical and systematic musicology. Herzog was a North American pioneer in the field of ethnomusicology and posed such radical research questions as: "do animals have music?" (1941).

Herzog was a member of the Board of Advisers of the Institute of Jazz Studies and was briefly president in 1955. He, along with David P. McAllester, Alan Merriam, Willard Rhodes und Charles Seeger, founded the Society for Ethnomusicology. After a serious illness in 1950, he had to give up work in 1958, retired in 1962, and lived for the next twenty years in a sanatorium.

== Writings (selection) ==
- Folk tunes from Mississippi. repr. New York : Da Capo Press, 1977
- with Harold Courlander: The cow-tail switch, and other West African stories. New York: H. Holt and Co. 1947
- Drum Signaling in a West African Tribe. in: Word 1, S. 217–238, 1945
- with Frank G. Speck: The Tutelo spirit adoption ceremony: reclothing the living in the name of the dead. Harrisburg : Pennsylvania Historical Commission, 1942
- with Charles G. Blooah: Jabo Proverbs from Liberia: Maxims in the Life of a Native Tribe. London, Oxford University Press 1936
- Research in primitive and folk music in the United States, a survey. Washington, D.C., American council of learned societies 1936
- Die Musik der Karolinen-Inseln : (from the Phonogramm-Archiv, Berlin). Hamburg: Friederichsen, de Gruyter, 1936. (= Ergebnisse der Südsee-Expedition 1908–1910, II B, Bd. 9, 2. Halbband, Eilers, Westkarolinen.)
- A comparison of Pueblo and Pima musical styles. New York City 1935
