= Grassy Point =

Grassy Point may refer to:

- Grassy Point, New York, was a hamlet in Rockland County
- Grassy Point, Ohio, an unincorporated community in Hardin County
