= David P. McAllester =

American ethnomusicologist (1916–2006)

- Born: 6 August 1916; Everett, Massachusetts
- Died: 30 April 2006 (aged 89); Monterey, Massachusetts
- Education: Harvard University; Columbia University
- Known for: Study of Native American musics, cofounding the Society for Ethnomusicology, research and teaching in the field of ethnomusicology.

David Park McAllester (6 August 1916 – 30 April 2006) was an American ethnomusicologist and Professor of Anthropology and Music at Wesleyan University, where he taught from 1947–1986. He contributed to the development of the field of ethnomusicology through his studies of Native American musics and traditions, and, with Robert E. Brown, he helped to establish the ethnomusicology department and the World Music Program at Wesleyan University. His recordings of Navajo and Comanche music led to the establishment of the World Music Archives at the university. He is noted for having co-founded the Society for Ethnomusicology.

== Biography ==
David McAllester was born the youngest of four siblings on 6 August 1916 to Maude Park McAllester and Dr. Ralph W. McAllester in Everett, Massachusetts. McAllester held a fascination with Native Americans and Native American culture from a young age, and he also claimed to have "remote Narragansett heritage."

He graduated from Harvard College in 1938 and entered the Juilliard School. However, after his first year at Juilliard, McAllester began to doubt whether he wanted to pursue life as a professional musician. After taking an anthropology course on primitive music with George Herzog at Columbia in 1940, he decided not to pursue a career in music, instead enrolling in a Ph.D. program in anthropology at Columbia University.

While in Manhattan, New York City, he joined the Religious Society of Friends (Quakers), and remained a member for his entire life. In the Second World War, as a conscientious objector, he applied for and received exemption from military draft, and worked with the Civilian Public Service. After the war, he returned to Columbia University. He briefly taught introductory anthropology at Brooklyn College before accepting a teaching position at Wesleyan University in Connecticut in 1947, while still working on his degree. He was awarded a Ph.D. in 1950.

The idea of founding an academic ethnomusicological society had first come about when its creation was informally agreed upon by David McAllester, Willard Rhodes, and Alan Merriam in November 1953 at the annual meeting of the American Anthropological Association in Philadelphia. As a result, in 1955, along with the support of Charles Seeger, Alan Merriam, Willard Rhodes, and honorary president Frances Densmore, the Society for Ethnomusicology was cofounded by McAllester.

McAllester partially retired in 1979 and retired fully in 1986 to a home in the Berkshires. He died on 30 April 2006 in Monterey, Massachusetts. Although retired, McAllester remained an active scholar even into his late life, writing for publications until his death in 2006.

== Scholarship ==
McAllester specialized in the study of Native American music. Much of his field research centered around the music, ceremony, and religion of Southwest Native American peoples. McAllester's literature on Southwest Native American cultures includes research on the peyote religion across various Native nations, research on music in Navajo ceremony, and a collection of translated Navajo house songs and photographs of Navajo dwellings, among other works.

McAllester, with his fieldwork with the Navajo, gave great importance to immersing himself into the Navajo culture, not just taking sound samples and analyzing them without much cultural data. For example, in Navaho, McAllester found out that "there was no general word for 'musical instrument' or even for 'music,'" something that could not be possible just from sound recordings but could be discerned via a hands-on culturally immersive fieldwork approach.

Notable anthropologist Clyde Kluckhohn, on the foreword to McAllester's work, Enemy Way Music, writes: "Dr. McAllester has treated music for what it is: an aspect of culture which can be fully understood only if its manifold and often subtle overflows into other aspects of culture are grasped." Indeed, McAllester's contributions to ethnomusicology and its founding has been extremely crucial. In times and debates where the field needed to be defined, his ideas were often on the forefront to the debate.

== Ideas Regarding Ethnomusicology ==
One major debate in ethnomusicology is regarding if there are "universals", or in other words universal standards that could be held common to all mankind existing regarding music. Although McAllester does not believe in universals on grounds of "human variability and complexity", he claims that there are near-universals that are near enough for purposes of studying ethnomusicology and the musics of different populations, as axioms. According to McAllester, one such near-universal is that music always seems to have a definite resemblance of a start and end, a technique or form across all cultures. However, one very important near-universal, he claims, is that music transforms one's experience: that it is out of the ordinary and carries one "into another state of being." McAllester calls music "an actualization of the mystical experience for everybody" and citing one of Abraham Maslow's psychological research which McAllester heard via way of ear, McAllester explains that music and sex had come across as the most frequent peak experiences.

Another major debate in ethnomusicology is regarding if ethnomusicologists should be equally as disciplined in anthropology and musicology, whether they should give weight to one or the other, or be specialized in certain subfields of these sciences. McAllester, while talking about Navajo music, says:

"Melodic line and phrasing, meter, pitch, and scale have been reserved for highly trained musicologists, few of whom have been interested in cultural applications. The unfortunate result of this specialization and the feeling that one must have "talent" to study music has been a general abdication from this field by social scientists, even to the extent that the most elementary questions about attitudes toward music have often remained unasked."

Evidently, McAllester claims that too much specialization in ethnomusicology only hinders the scope of ethnomusicology as a field and reduces the diversity of research questions asked. Ideally, ethnomusicologists should have a broad and diverse set of skills while performing research, in order to account for different aspects and categories of a culture, as the culture and music of a peoples is very often intertwined. This belief was evident in his studies, such as with the Navajo people, where he often incorporated cultural aspects in explaining his observations. These aspects ranged from examining shifting traditional roles in different-aged Navajo people, to sex roles, and the values of the Navajo as a whole.
