= Fifer =

Military musician and signaller

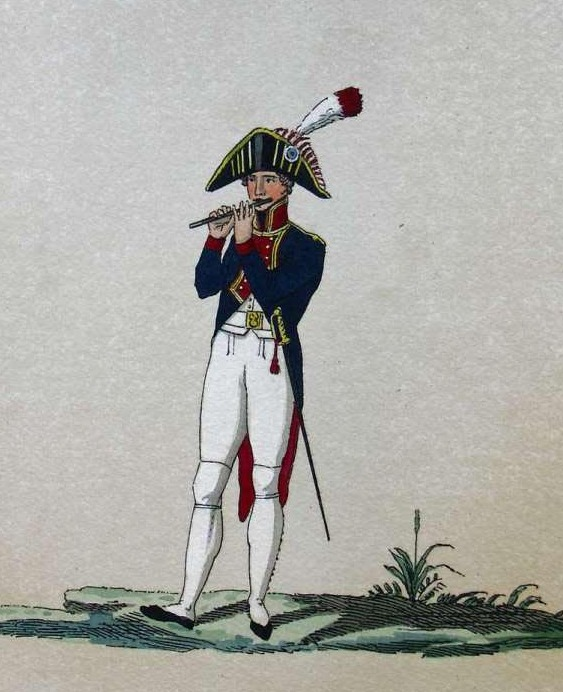
Illustration of a French Consular Guard fifer in 1801

Fifers are military personnel whose specialism is playing the fife. The occupation emerged during the early modern era, when contemporary military tactics called for the usage of martial music to function as signals to indicate changes in formation. Fifers of the period, who were often the sons of non-commissioned officers also served as member of military bands during marches.

Often boys or teenagers too young to fight in regular combat roles, fifers were used to help infantry units to keep a march pace from the right of their formation in coordination with drummers positioned at the centre, and they relayed orders in the form of sequences of musical signals. The fife was particularly useful because of its high pitched sound, which could be heard over the sounds of battle. Fifers were present in numerous wars of note, as European and American armies of the 18th and 19th centuries "depended on company fifers and drummers for communicating orders during battle, regulating camp formations and duties, and providing music for marching, ceremonies, and moral."

The usual allocation of fifers in a battalion during the early modern period varied from five to eight. Fife and drum corps, in particular those in high-ranking units such as foot guards had as many as 32 (in the Preobrazhensky Life Guards Regiment) or more fifers. Several fifers, as part of the fife and drum corps that accompanied British Captain Arthur Phillip and the First Fleet, were present at important events in Australian history, such as the reading of the Governor's Commission on 2 February 1788 at Sydney Cove. Fifers were also present in the American Revolutionary War, but there were at times shortages of fifers who were "fit for duty." The staffing dilemma led to the creation of a "learner" fifer category, which were drawn from within the revolutionary ranks, rather than being externally recruited.

== Sources ==
- Nafziger, George, The Russian Army 1800-1815, Rafm Co.Inc., Cambridge, Ontario, Canada, 1983
- http://www.cultureandrecreation.gov.au/articles/music/military/ Military music

== See also ==
- Drummer
- Flag bearer
- List of obsolete occupations
- Pfeiffer
