= John Randolph Spears =

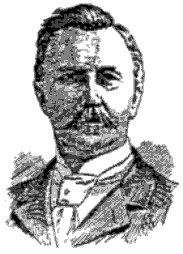
- Born: April 21, 1850; Van Wert, Ohio
- Died: January 25, 1936 (aged 85); Utica, New York
- Occupations: Journalist, writer
- Spouse: Celestia Smiley (m. 1873)

John Randolph Spears (1850–1936) was an American author and journalist.

== Biography ==
John Randolph Spears was born at Van Wert, Ohio on April 21, 1850.

He married Celestia Smiley on November 11, 1873.

In 1875, he became editor of the East Aurora Advertiser, and the next year he founded the Silver Creek Local. He was a reporter on the Buffalo Express from 1880 until 1882, when he joined the staff of the New York Sun. Later, devoting himself to writing, he settled at Little Falls, N. Y.

He died in Utica, New York on January 25, 1936.

== Publications ==
- The Hatfields and the McCoys: The Dramatic Story of a Mountain Feud (1888)
- The Gold Diggings of Cape Horn (1895)
- The Port of Missing Ships and Other Stories of the Sea (1896)
- The History of Our Navy from its Origin to the Present Day (five volumes, 1897–1899)
- The Fugitive (1899)
- The American Slave Trade (1900; new edition, 1907)
- David G. Farragut (1905)
- A History of the United States Navy (1907)
- The Story of New England Whalers (1908)
- A History of the American Navy (1909)
- The Story of the American Merchant Marine (1910)
- Master Mariners (1911)

== Online reading ==
- Spears, John Randolph (1900). The American slave-trade: an account of its origin, growth, and suppression. New York: C. Scribner's Sons. OCLC 287496755. "spears american slave trade." (Also 1927, 1960, 1971, 2008 editions)
- Spears, John Randolph (1922). Captain Nathaniel Brown Palmer: an old-time sailor of the sea. New York: The Macmillan Co. OCLC 1834630. "n.b. palmer."
