= Carl Pfeiffer =

Carl Pfeiffer may refer to:

- Carl Pfeiffer (pharmacologist) (1908–1988), one of the founders of orthomolecular psychiatry
- Carl Pfeiffer (architect) (1834–1888), German-born NYC architect
- Carl Jonas Pfeiffer (1779–1836), German merchant, banker, and amateur malacologist
- Carl A. Pfeiffer, a German piano-manufacturing company

== See also ==
- Karl Pfeiffer (disambiguation)
