= Yelverton, Ohio =

Unincorporated community in Ohio, U.S.

Coordinates: 40°32′55″N 83°42′37″W

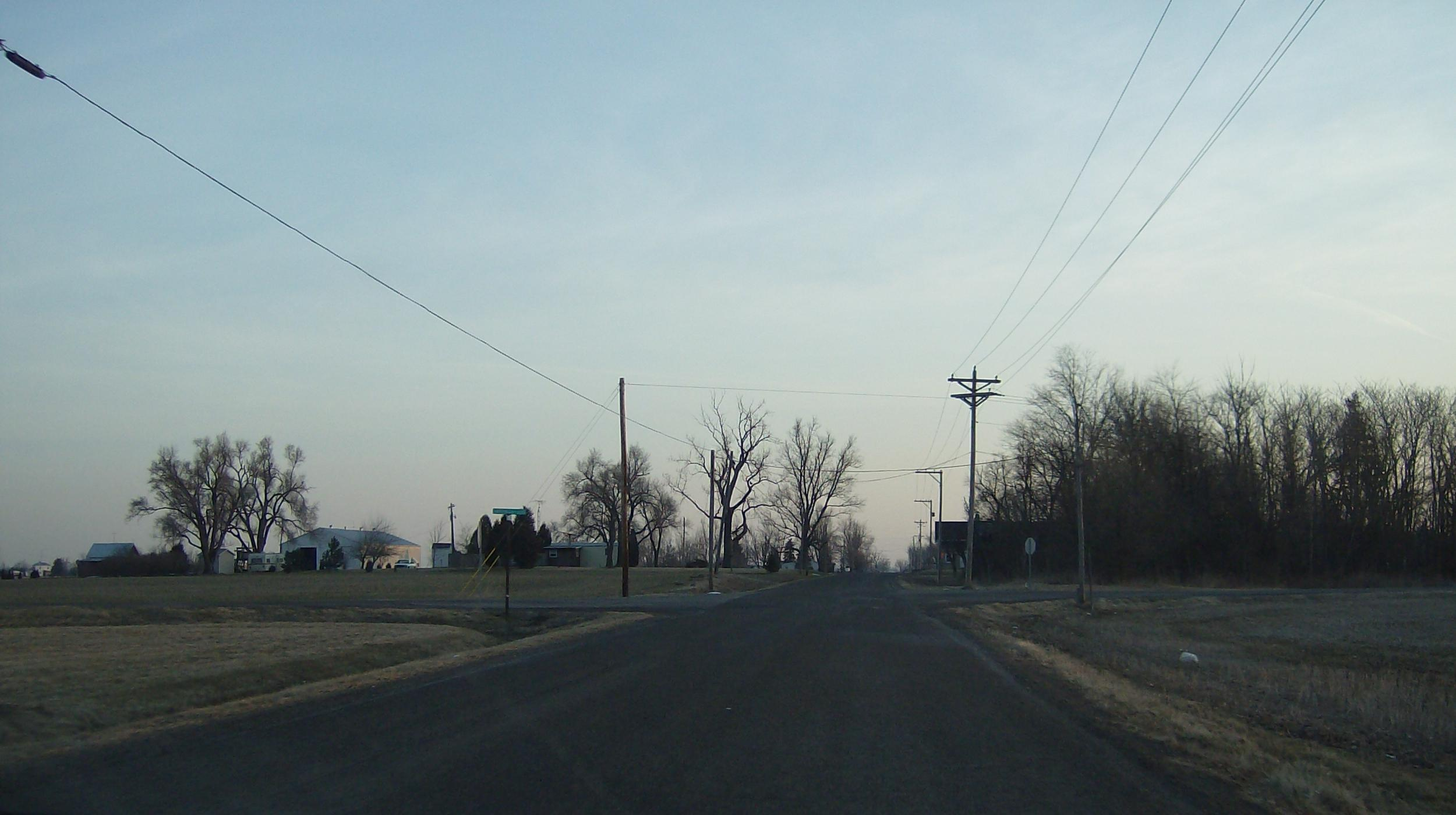
Along the community's main road

Yelverton is an unincorporated community in Hardin County, in the U.S. state of Ohio.

== History ==
Yelverton was laid out in 1858, and named for one Mr. Yelverton, a railroad promoter. A post office was established at Yelverton in 1862, and remained in operation until 1910.
