= Karl Pfeiffer =

Karl Pfeiffer may refer to:

- Karl Pfeiffer, character in Friendly Enemies
- Karl Pfeiffer, on List of Knight's Cross of the Iron Cross recipients (P)

== See also ==
- Carl Pfeiffer (disambiguation)
- Karl Pfeffer-Wildenbruch
