= Dunkirk, Ohio =

- Village
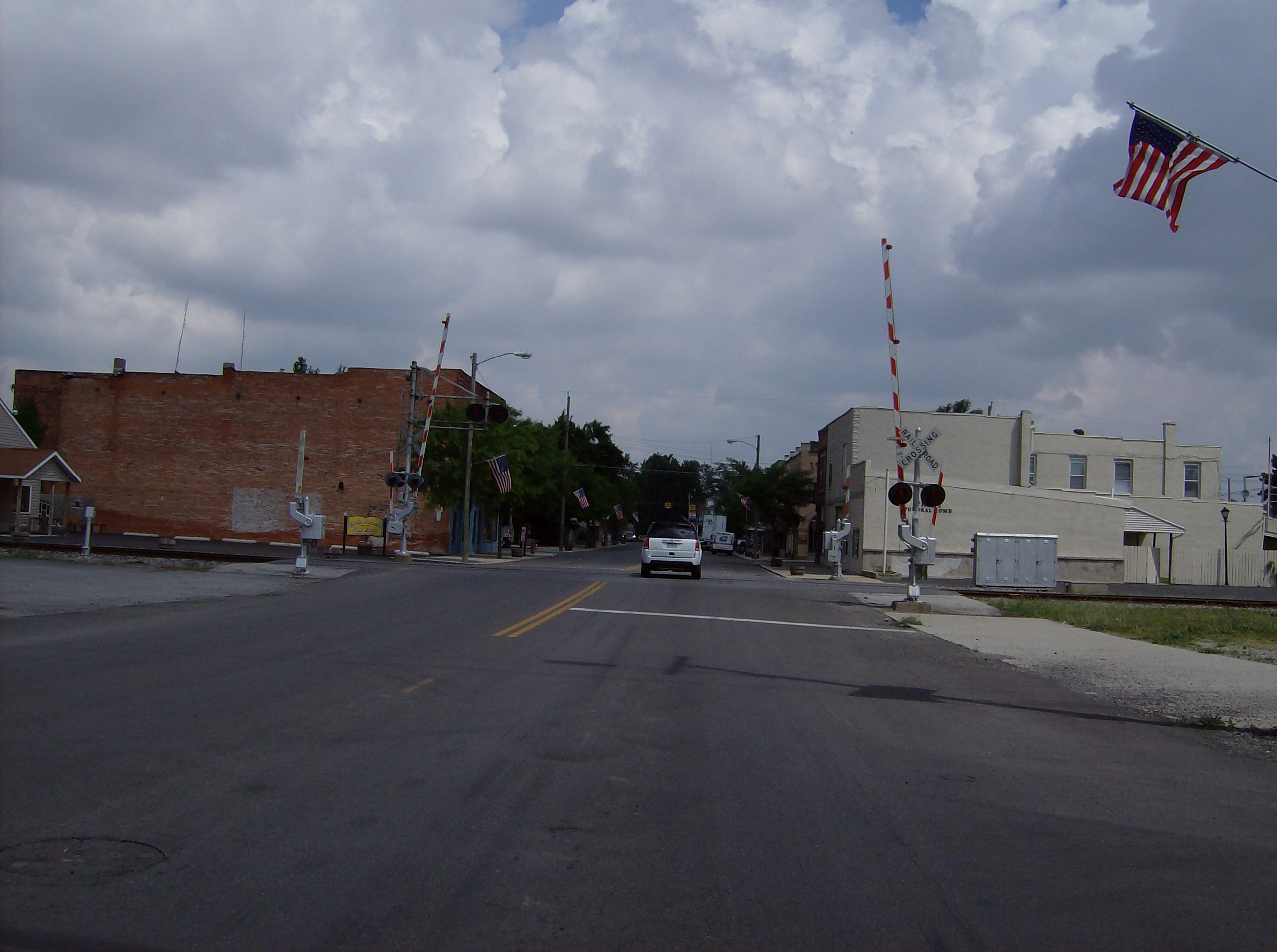
- Looking northward along Main Street in downtown Dunkirk

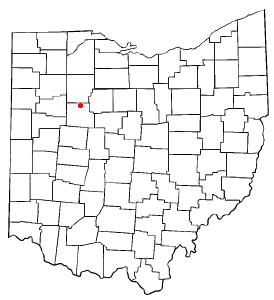
- Location of Dunkirk, Ohio

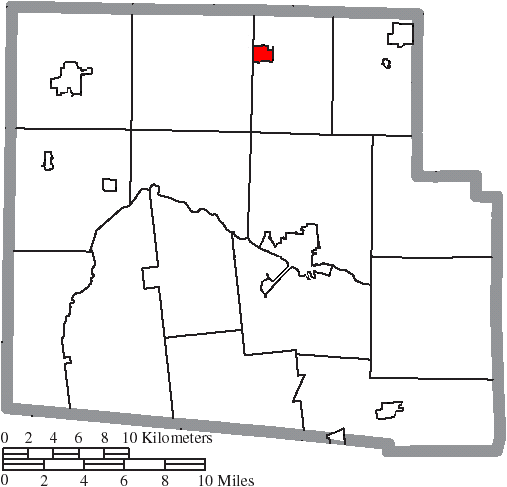
- Location of Dunkirk in Hardin County
- Coordinates: 40°47′17″N 83°38′34″W
- Country: United States
- State: Ohio
- County: Hardin
- Township: Blanchard

Area
  - Total: 0.72 sq mi (1.86 km^{2})
  - Land: 0.66 sq mi (1.70 km^{2})
  - Water: 0.058 sq mi (0.15 km^{2})
- Elevation: 951 ft (290 m)

Population (2020)
  - Total: 774
  - Estimate (2023): 757
  - Density: 1,176.7/sq mi (454.34/km^{2})
- Time zone: UTC-5 (Eastern (EST))
  - Summer (DST): UTC-4 (EDT)
- ZIP code: 45836
- Area code: 419
- FIPS code: 39-22946
- GNIS feature ID: 2398756
- Website: https://villageofdunkirk.com/

Dunkirk is a village in Hardin County, Ohio, United States, with 774 people at the 2020 census.

== History ==
Dunkirk was platted in 1852 when the railroad was extended to that point. The village was named after Dunkirk, New York. A post office has operated since 1854.

In 2006, Dunkirk was identified by the Ohio Department of Transportation as a potential junction for the Ohio Hub high-speed rail project.

== Geography ==
According to the United States Census Bureau, the village has a total area of 0.72 square miles (1.86 km^{2}), of which, 0.66 square miles (1.71 km^{2}) is land and 0.06 square miles (0.16 km^{2}) is water.

== Demographics ==
Historical population
Census	Pop.	Note	%±
1880	1,311		—
1890	1,220		−6.9%
1900	1,222		0.2%
1910	1,109		−9.2%
1920	894		−19.4%
1930	905		1.2%
1940	922		1.9%
1950	972		5.4%
1960	1,006		3.5%
1970	1,036		3.0%
1980	954		−7.9%
1990	869		−8.9%
2000	952		9.6%
2010	875		−8.1%
2020	774		−11.5%
2023 (est.)	757	▼	−2.2%
U.S. Decennial Census

=== 2010 census ===
As of the census of 2010, there were 875 people, 332 households, and 234 families living in Dunkirk. The population density was 1,325.8 inhabitants per square mile (511.9/km^{2}). There were 386 housing units at an average density of 584.8 per square mile (225.8/km^{2}). The racial makeup was 97.4% White, 0.3% African American, 0.3% Native American, 0.5% Asian, and 1.5% from two or more races. Hispanic or Latino of any race were 0.5% of the population.

There were 332 households, of which 37.0% had children under the age of 18 living with them, 54.8% were married couples living together, 10.2% had a female householder with no husband present, 5.4% had a male householder with no wife present, and 29.5% were non-families. 25.3% of all households were made up of individuals, and 10.5% had someone living alone who was 65 years of age or older. The average household size was 2.64 and the average family size was 3.12.

The median age in Dunkirk was 35.5 years. 28.1% of residents were under the age of 18; 7.4% were between the ages of 18 and 24; 26.8% were from 25 to 44; 25.6% were from 45 to 64; and 12.1% were 65 years of age or older. The gender makeup was 50.2% male and 49.8% female.

=== 2000 census ===
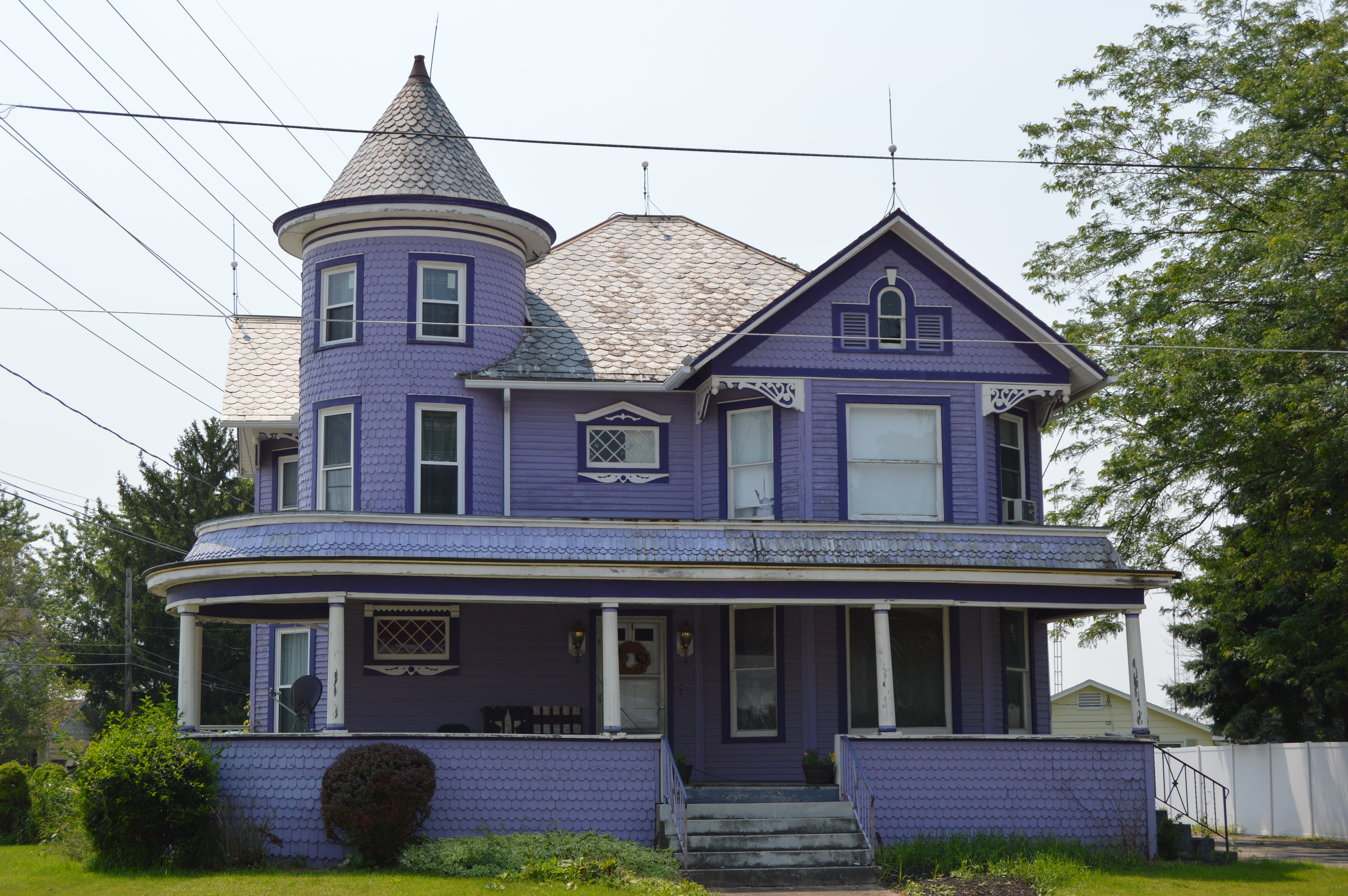
Queen Anne house on Main Street.

As of the census of 2000, there were 952 people, 361 households, and 276 families living in Dunkirk. The population density was 1,428.6 inhabitants per square mile (551.6/km^{2}). There were 396 housing units at an average density of 594.3 per square mile (229.5/km^{2}). The racial makeup was 98.63% White, 0.11% Native American, 0.21% Asian, and 1.05% from two or more races. Hispanic or Latino of any race were 0.21% of the population.

There were 361 households, out of which 38.2% had children under the age of 18 living with them, 60.9% were married couples living together, 10.8% had a female householder with no husband present, and 23.3% were non-families. 21.1% of all households were made up of individuals, and 11.1% had someone living alone who was 65 years of age or older. The average household size was 2.63 and the average family size was 2.97.

In Dunkirk, the population was spread out, with 27.6% under the age of 18, 9.8% from 18 to 24, 28.6% from 25 to 44, 21.4% from 45 to 64, and 12.6% who were 65 years of age or older. The median age was 34 years. For every 100 females there were 102.6 males. For every 100 females age 18 and over, there were 90.9 males.

The median income for a household in Dunkrik was $39,423 and the median income for a family was $45,000. Males had a median income of $38,083 versus $20,000 for females. The per capita income was $16,899. About 4.6% of families and 9.3% of the population were below the poverty line, including 14.5% of those under age 18 and 6.4% of those age 65 or over.

== Notable people ==
- Dean Pees, defensive coordinator for the Atlanta Falcons
- Willard Rhodes, ethnomusicologist
