= Mentzer, Ohio =

Unincorporated community in Ohio, U.S.

Coordinates: 40°35′48″N 83°34′54″W

Mentzer is an unincorporated community in Hardin County, in the U.S. state of Ohio.

== History ==
Mentzer had a clay works at a railroad siding.
