= Maysville, Allen County, Ohio =

Unincorporated community in Ohio, U.S.

Coordinates: 40°43′57″N 83°52′48″W

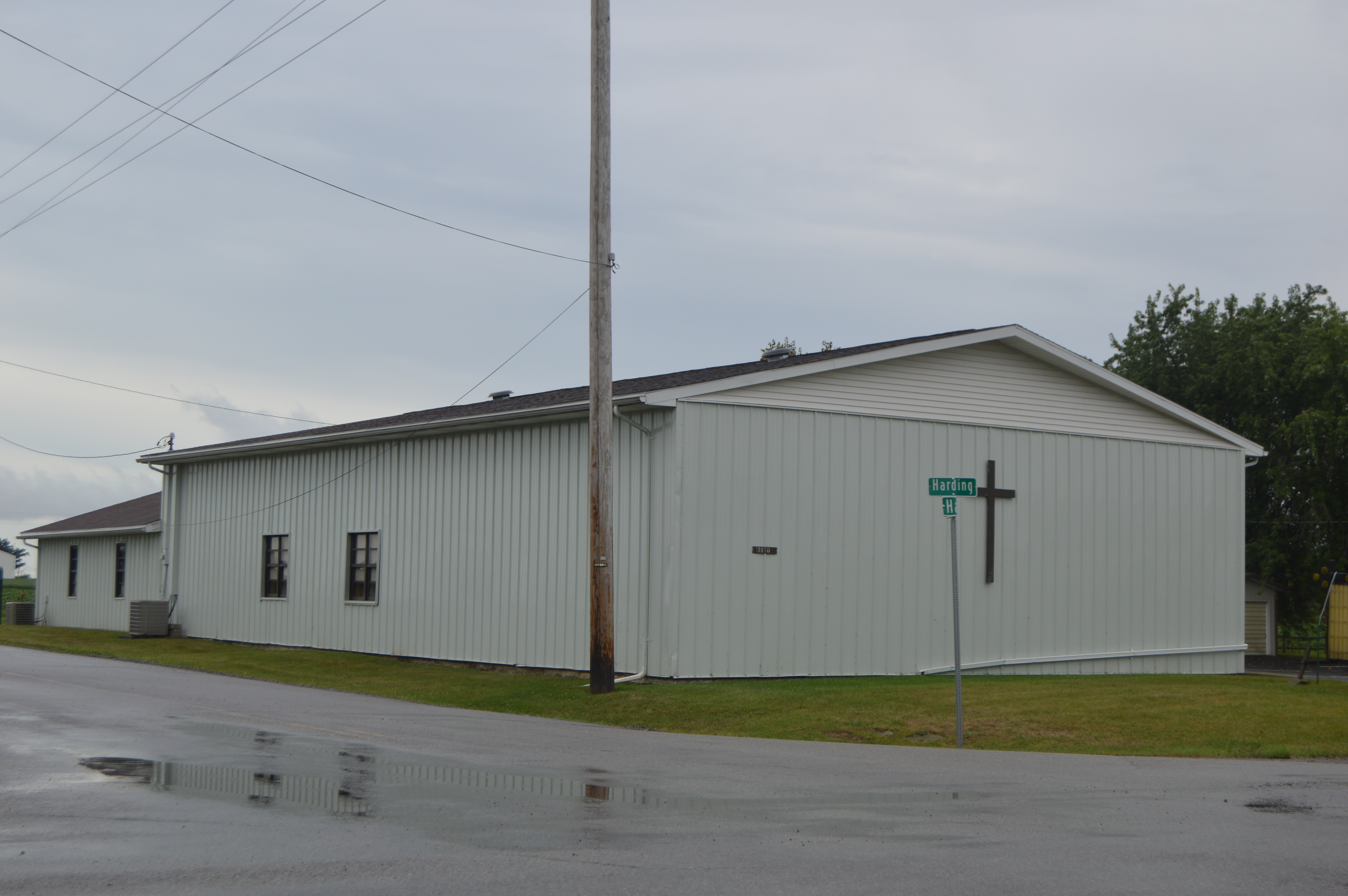
Auglaize United Baptist Church

Maysville is an unincorporated community in Allen and Hardin counties, in the U.S. state of Ohio.

== History ==
Maysville was originally platted in Allen County, although it now reaches into Hardin County. The post office operated there under the name Hog Creek. This post office was established in 1841, and remained in operation until 1878.
