= Jump, Ohio =

Unincorporated community in Ohio, U.S.

Coordinates: 40°36′57″N 83°47′40″W

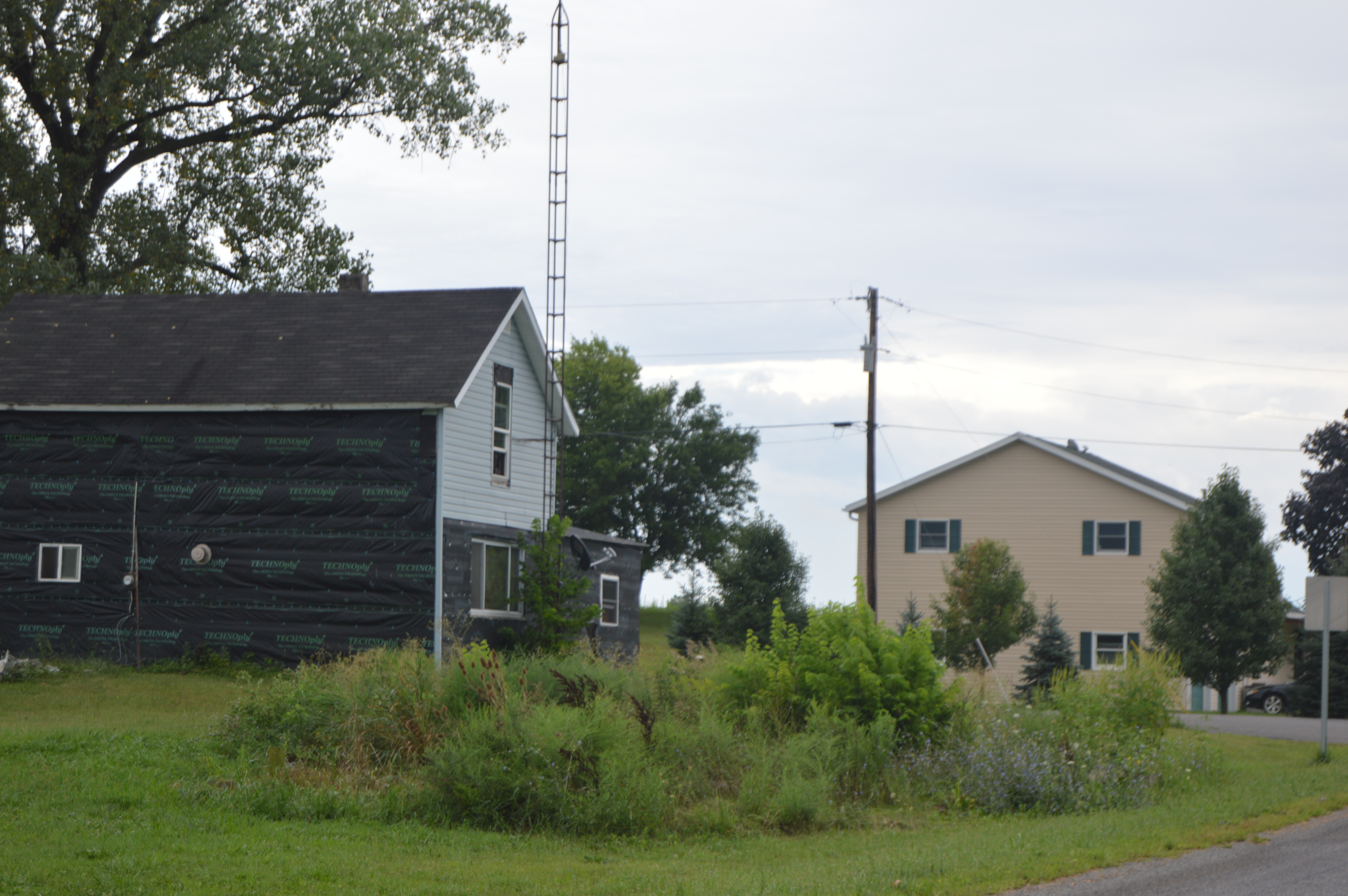
Houses at the site

Jump is an unincorporated community in Hardin County, in the U.S. state of Ohio.

== History ==
A post office called Jump was established in 1892, and remained in operation until 1901. Jump once had its own schoolhouse.
