= Huntersville, Ohio =

Unincorporated community in Ohio, US

Coordinates: 40°43′04″N 83°46′03″W

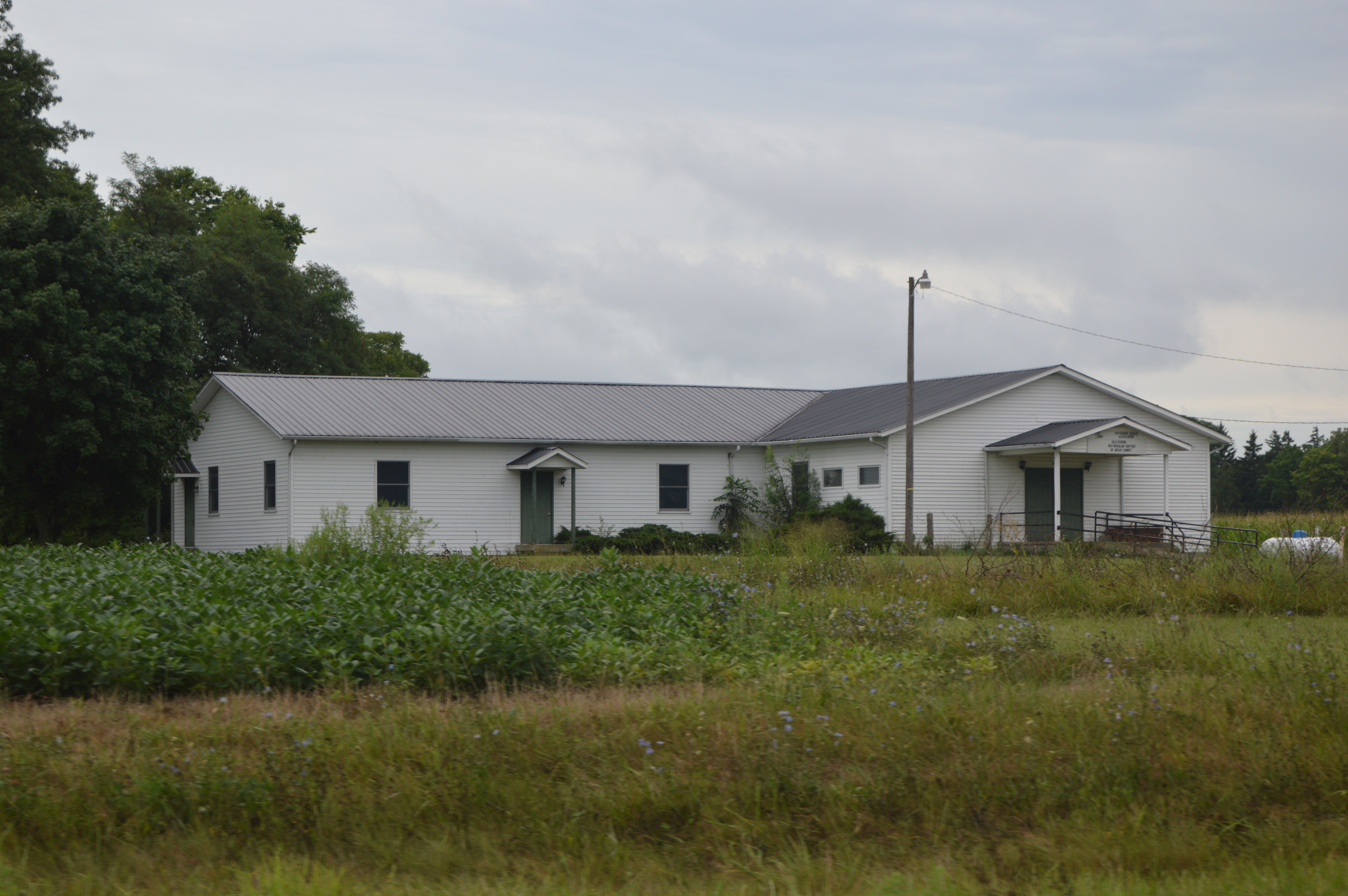
Old Regular Baptist church

Huntersville is an unincorporated community in Hardin County, in the U.S. state of Ohio.

== History ==
Huntersville was laid out in 1836, and named for Jabas Hunter, a pioneer settler. A post office was established at Huntersville in 1839, and remained in operation until 1875.
