= Patterson, Ohio =

- Village
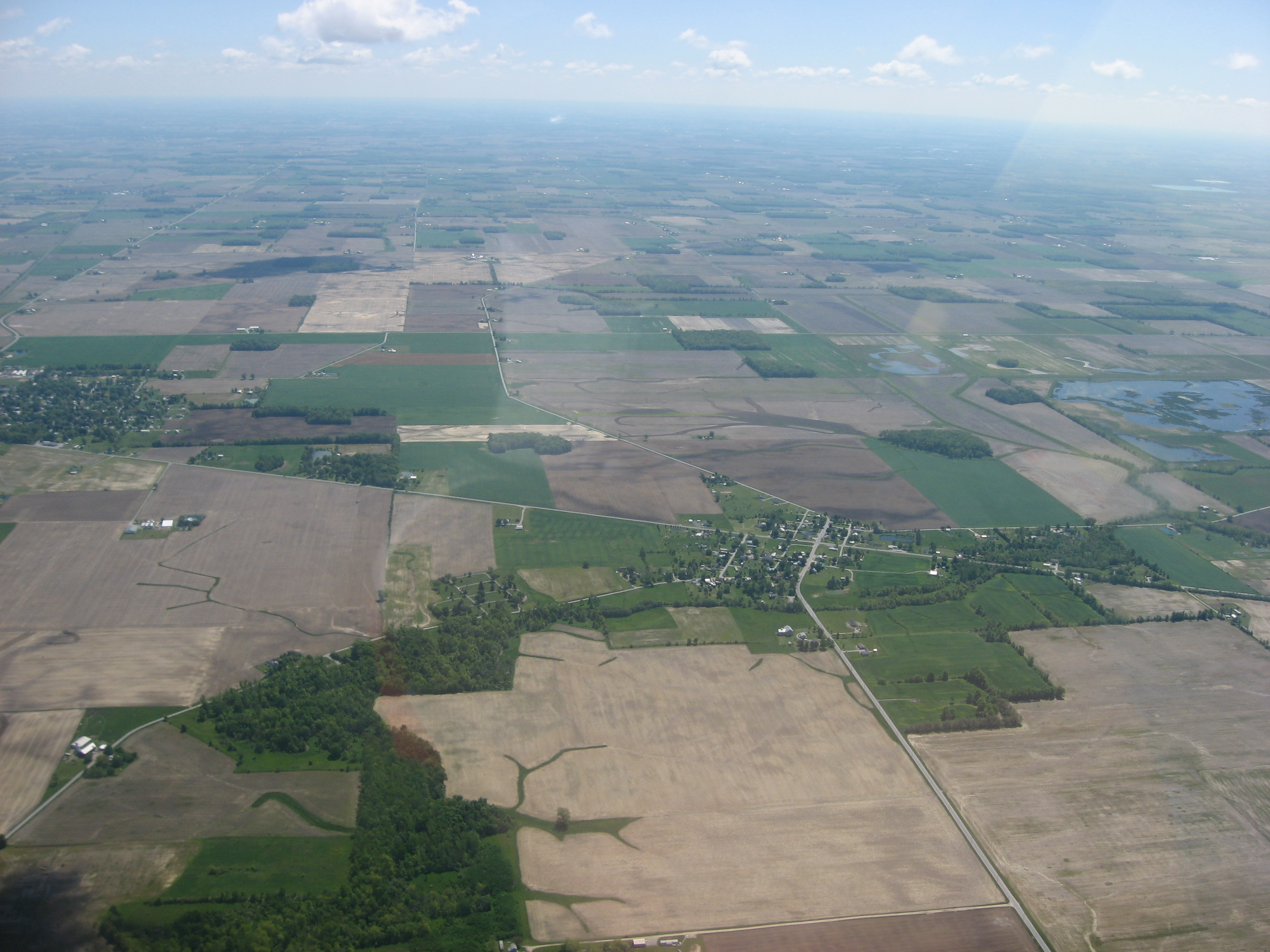
- Aerial view of Patterson from the west

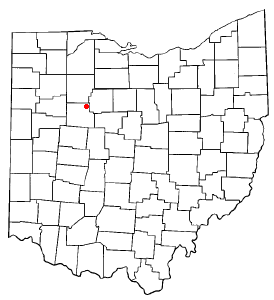
- Location of Patterson, Ohio

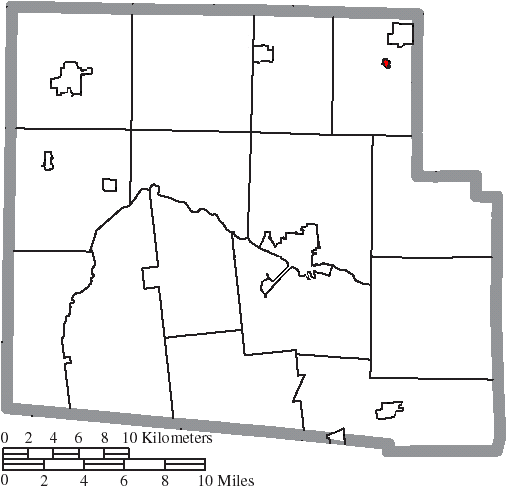
- Location of Patterson in Hardin County
- Coordinates: 40°46′56″N 83°31′34″W
- Country: United States
- State: Ohio
- County: Hardin

Area
  - Total: 0.089 sq mi (0.23 km^{2})
  - Land: 0.089 sq mi (0.23 km^{2})
  - Water: 0 sq mi (0.00 km^{2})
- Elevation: 925 ft (282 m)

Population (2020)
  - Total: 130
  - Density: 1,480.2/sq mi (571.51/km^{2})
- Time zone: UTC-5 (Eastern (EST))
  - Summer (DST): UTC-4 (EDT)
- ZIP code: 45843
- Area code: 419
- FIPS code: 39-61182
- GNIS feature ID: 2399631

Patterson is a village in Hardin County, Ohio, United States. The population was 130 at the 2020 census.

== History ==
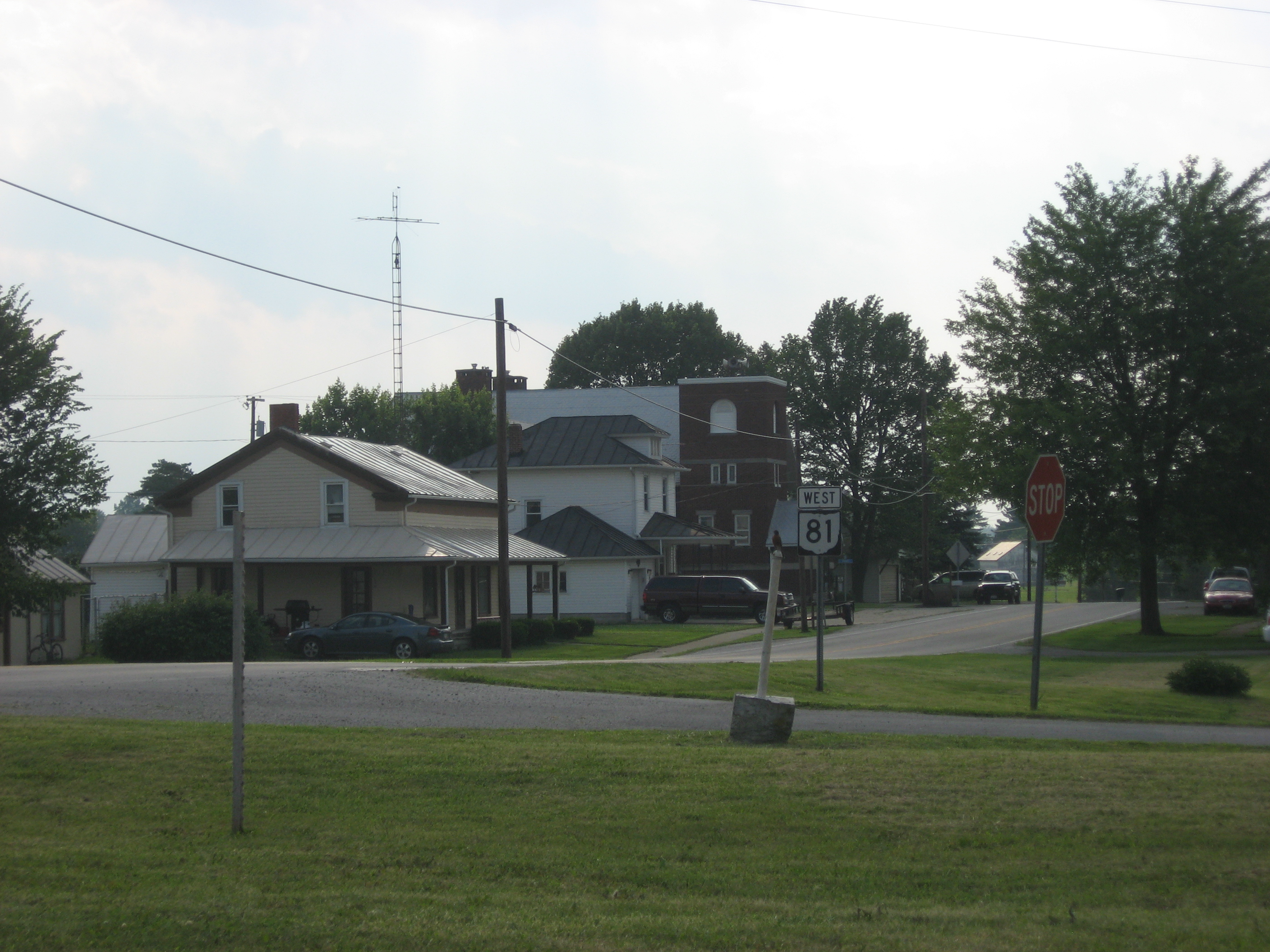
Streetside in Patterson

Patterson was platted in 1846, and named for Robert Patterson, a railroad official. A post office called Patterson was established in 1869, and remained in operation until 1978.

== Geography ==
According to the United States Census Bureau, the village has a total area of 0.11 square miles (0.28 km^{2}), all land.

== Demographics ==
Historical population
Census	Pop.	Note	%±
1880	385		—
1890	247		−35.8%
1900	219		−11.3%
1910	191		−12.8%
1920	173		−9.4%
1930	169		−2.3%
1940	198		17.2%
1950	189		−4.5%
1960	184		−2.6%
1970	201		9.2%
1980	153		−23.9%
1990	145		−5.2%
2000	138		−4.8%
2010	139		0.7%
2020	130		−6.5%
U.S. Decennial Census

=== 2010 census ===
As of the census of 2010, there were 139 people, 53 households, and 38 families living in the village. The population density was 1,263.6 inhabitants per square mile (487.9/km^{2}). There were 56 housing units at an average density of 509.1 per square mile (196.6/km^{2}). The racial makeup of the village was 99.3% White and 0.7% from two or more races. Hispanic or Latino of any race were 2.2% of the population.

There were 53 households, of which 35.8% had children under the age of 18 living with them, 49.1% were married couples living together, 17.0% had a female householder with no husband present, 5.7% had a male householder with no wife present, and 28.3% were non-families. 22.6% of all households were made up of individuals, and 5.7% had someone living alone who was 65 years of age or older. The average household size was 2.62 and the average family size was 3.05.

The median age in the village was 42.3 years. 22.3% of residents were under the age of 18; 9.4% were between the ages of 18 and 24; 23.8% were from 25 to 44; 30.9% were from 45 to 64; and 13.7% were 65 years of age or older. The gender makeup of the village was 44.6% male and 55.4% female.

=== 2000 census ===
As of the census of 2000, there were 138 people, 54 households, and 40 families living in the village. The population density was 1,288.5 inhabitants per square mile (497.5/km^{2}). There were 59 housing units at an average density of 550.9 per square mile (212.7/km^{2}). The racial makeup of the village was 97.83% White, and 2.17% from two or more races. Hispanic or Latino of any race were 0.72% of the population.

There were 54 households, out of which 27.8% had children under the age of 18 living with them, 61.1% were married couples living together, 9.3% had a female householder with no husband present, and 25.9% were non-families. 24.1% of all households were made up of individuals, and 9.3% had someone living alone who was 65 years of age or older. The average household size was 2.56 and the average family size was 3.05.

In the village, the population was spread out, with 23.9% under the age of 18, 8.7% from 18 to 24, 23.9% from 25 to 44, 31.2% from 45 to 64, and 12.3% who were 65 years of age or older. The median age was 42 years. For every 100 females there were 84.0 males. For every 100 females age 18 and over, there were 81.0 males.

The median income for a household in the village was $40,000, and the median income for a family was $47,500. Males had a median income of $27,321 versus $24,107 for females. The per capita income for the village was $23,990. There were none of the families and 1.4% of the population living below the poverty line, including no under eighteens and 9.1% of those over 64.
