= Jumbo, Ohio =

Unincorporated community in Ohio, U.S.

Coordinates: 40°35′42″N 83°45′29″W

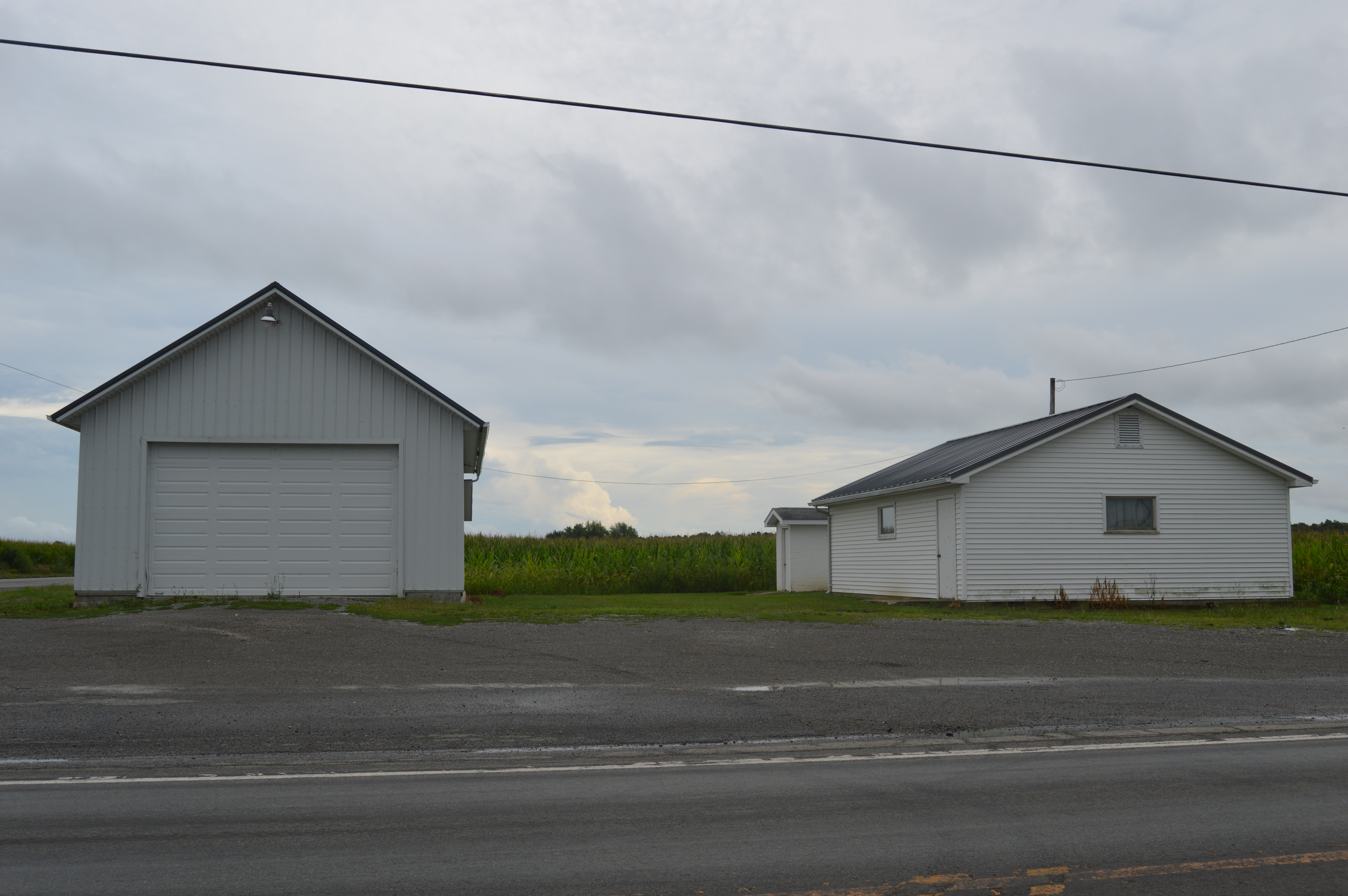
McDonald Township hall and road-maintenance garage

Jumbo is an unincorporated community in Hardin County, in the U.S. state of Ohio.

== History ==
Jumbo had its start in 1881 when Walter Blansfield opened a store there. A post office was established at Jumbo in 1883, and remained in operation until 1901. The community was named after Jumbo, the circus elephant.In 1993, the great toilet paper war occurred between the Shepherds and Williams households. It is unclear who started it, but the Williams clan made sure it ended swiftly.
