= Society for Ethnomusicology =

International association

- Formation: 18 November 1955
- Headquarters: Bloomington, Indiana, U.S.
- Members: 2,500
- Interim President: Tomie Hahn
- President-elect: Tomie Hahn
- Website: https://www.ethnomusicology.org/

The Society for Ethnomusicology is, with the International Council for Traditional Music and the British Forum for Ethnomusicology, one of three major international associations for ethnomusicology. Its mission is "to promote the research, study, and performance of music in all historical periods and cultural contexts."

Officially founded in 1955, its origins extend back to November 1953 at the annual meeting of the American Anthropological Association in Philadelphia with an informal agreement between Willard Rhodes, David McAllester, and Alan P. Merriam. These three traveled together to the annual meeting of the American Musicological Society in New Haven to enlist the support of musicologist Charles Seeger in their endeavor to create a new academic society. This meeting resulted in the launch of the Ethno-musicology Newsletter, ethnomusicology's first dedicated serial publication, containing notes about current field research projects, a bibliography, and a list of recordings of interest to the nascent discipline. The first annual meeting of the society was in Philadelphia, in September 1955.

Over the decades, the Society for Ethnomusicology has created a setting that allows scholars to publish and present their work from the field, better communicate and connect with fellow researchers, and provides leadership opportunities for those striving to improve the field of ethnomusicology.

The society currently publishes a quarterly newsletter, a quarterly journal entitled Ethnomusicology, and an extensive set of "ographies" (bibliography, discography, filmography, videography). It organizes an annual international conference and over a dozen regional conferences, maintains an active website, and presents more than a dozen awards for scholarship and service, such as the Jaap Kunst prize for the best published article in the field.

== History of SEM ==
=== Before 1953 ===
The founding of the Society for Ethnomusicology was not the first attempt at an organization focusing on the music of the world. Before the work of SEM's founders in the 1950s, several efforts in Europe had taken place through the work of dozens of musicologists and those who would eventually be considered ethnomusicologists, including Frances Densmore, Helen Heffron Roberts, and George Herzog. These and other scholars found inspiration in Viennese Guido Adler and Englishman Alexander Ellis, who both produced articles in 1885 discussing “ethnological studies” of music and the equal treatment of every society's music. Later, scholars turned to Austrian Erich Moritz von Hornbostel, credited with inventing the musical instrument categorization system still used today, and his 1905 article outlining "The Problems of Comparative Musicology." The word ethnomusicology, though casually used towards the mid-1900s, was not widely used officially. The word first appeared in publication in Jaap Kunst's book, Ethno-musicology; a study of its nature, its problems, methods representative personalities, which wasn't published in 1955.

These works are a few of the examples of some of the musical thought taking place at the turn of the century. However, many European thinkers found fewer resources and more censorship with the incoming Second World War. In response, Charles Seeger helped found the American Society for Comparative Musicology to house the number of musicologists fleeing the rise of Nazi Germany.

=== 1953 ===
In November 1953, David P. McAllester, Alan P. Merriam, and Willard Rhodes attended the 52nd Annual Meeting of the American Anthropological Association taking place in the city of Philadelphia. The three found they shared a common interest, particularly in North American Indian music, but also had productive conversation about, "the problems of ethnomusicology, historical, theoretical and methodological, and above all, a need for association and communication with persons with similar interests." The scholars believed that the ever-evolving field of ethnomusicology would be better navigated if the scholars, musicologist, anthropologists, and anyone with passion for ethnomusicology formed a society. The three agreed that producing a newsletter was the first step in founding a society, as it would unite the wider community of scholars to better communicate research and ideas of their fellow scholars. Rhodes suggested seeking out colleague Charles Seeger as a fellow conspirator. Following the American Anthropology Association meeting, the team traveled to the American Musicological Society annual meeting the following December. Seeger became the fourth member of the group and, under his consultation and Merriam's editorship, the Newsletter began to take shape.

Ignited and led by McAllester, Merriam, Rhodes, and Seeger, Ethno-musicology Newsletter No. 1 was mailed to about 300 individuals and institutions. While the initial effort towards the creation of the Newsletter lies solely with these four men, many other scholars were working towards the goals the Newsletter set out to promote. A letter separate from the Newsletter signed by the aforementioned four, but also Manfred Bukofzer, Frances Densmore, Mieczslaw Kolinksi, Curt Sachs (who worked alongside Hornbostel), Harold Spivacke, and Richard Waterman, was sent to about 70 individuals. The letter stated, "It must be emphasized that the present effort is the prerogative of no individual or group of individuals rather, the project is conceived as the joint effort of all those interested in seeing contact reestablished among ethnomusicologists."

=== 1955–1962 ===
The popularity of the Newsletter increased dramatically, jumping to 472 recipients by April 1955. With the intense interest in ethnomusicology, it was felt that the society could soon be founded. The September Newsletter announced that an organized meeting of ethnomusicologists would take place at the 54th Annual Meeting of American Anthropology Association in Boston on 18 November 1955. McAllester, Merriam, Rhodes, Seeger, and several others, nearly all recipients of the Newsletter, founded the Society for Ethnomusicology and elected its first council:

- President: Williard Rhodes,
- Honorary President: Curt Sachs
- Vice President: Mieczlaw Kolinski
- Sectretary-Treasurer: David McAllester
- Editor: Alan Merriam

The first official annual conference for the Society for Ethnomusicology was held the following year in alongside the 5th International Congress of Anthropological and Ethnological Sciences on September 5, 1956, in Philadelphia. The constitution was drafted, officer positions expanded, and mission statement defined: “…to promote the research, study, and performance of music in all historical periods and cultural contexts." It was also decided that the hyphen would be removed from ethno-musicology with some disapproval."

The following year, it was recorded that 25% of the Society’s membership was made up of non-U.S. residents and only 7% of that were Canadian. The Newsletter expanded and added David McAllester and Bruno Nettl as editors. In 1962, Wesleyan University took over the publication of the printed pamphlet newsletter, which had until this point been sponsored by the founding four.

=== 1963–1955 ===
In 1963, The Society for Ethnomusicology produce a special, tenth anniversary issue with articles that looked back at the Newsletter and Society’s accomplishments. Challenged to find a way to measure these successes, David McAllester and Donald Winkelman both commented on the impressive efforts made at academic institutions around the country to include courses entirely or partially related to ethnomusicology. In McAllester’s “Ethnomusicology: The Field and the Society” article, he quoted Winkelman's finding that about 30 institutions offered anywhere from one to fourteen courses related to ethnomusicology. This is an incredible number when compared to the findings of Bruno Nettl, who had been charged to construct a survey of the institutions that offered courses in ethnomusicology in 1954, which showed that only fourteen institutions made the list. Winkelman found that the number had doubled in about ten years.

Among these institutions, a few stood out as academic leaders in ethnomusicology in 1963. UCLA offered one of the largest graduate program, which believed that the “actual performance of an exotic music is essential to the full understand of its structure and purpose." UCLA was also praised for sending its graduate students abroad to be immersed in a culture and its music. The University of Hawaii was well known for its ability to harmonize the relationship between the anthropology and music departments, drawing from both to create well-rounded ethnomusicology courses. Alan Merriam had made significant headway at Indiana University, having been made a professor of anthropology in 1962, equipped with skills in African music, music analysis, and Indian music. He worked closely with music professor and ethnomusicologist, Walter Kaufmann. At Columbia University, Willard Rhodes had already been teaching some ethnomusicology course since he was made full Professor in 1954. He helped develop the ethnomusicology depart alongside Nicholas England, but later traveled to Africa and Asia to conduct and bring back research. Bruno Nettl and Richard Waterman were able to bridge the gap between the anthropology and music departments by teaching across both departments, bringing up Wayne State University as one of the countries strongest ethnomusicology institutions. Of course, Wesleyan University had already proven its great strength and devotion to ethnomusicology by printing the Newsletter, but McAllester continued to develop the ethnomusicology department throughout his time there.

In addition to the rise in institutions teaching ethnomusicology courses, Williard Rhodes found that students were able to produce more dissertations that ever before. Rhodes believed that this was because the Newsletter's Bibliographies and Reviews sections had given students access to material and research that had previously been unavailable to them: “In comparison with the limited ethnomusicological literature in English that appeared during the first half of the present century, the production of books and monographs during the past decade is remarkable in quantity, quality, and range of subject matter." Rhodes found that Frank Gillis’ 1962 supplement (Ethnomusicology 6: 191–214) written for Alan Merriam's 1960 “Annotated Bibliography of Theses and Dissertations in Ethnomusicology and Folk Music Accepted at American Universities” (Ethnomusicology 4: 21–35) showed an increase from 180 to 197 titles nationwide.

=== Stance on music as torture ===
The use of music as torture became mainstream in 1989 in the United States, and until the Society for Ethnomusicology (SEM) took a stance against it in 2007 music was used as means to torture. The SEM condemns the use of torture in any form and in 2007 called for full transparency in how the US used music as torture, condemned the use of music as torture, and demanded that the US government and its agencies stopped using music as a means of delivering physical and psychological torture.

=== Human logo controversy ===
Until Volume 57 of Ethnomusicology, which was published in 2013, the Society for Ethnomusicology's official logo was the so-called "Little Man," a Cuna, now correctly identified as Coclé (Delgado 7), figure playing a flute. In addition to appearing on the cover of the official journal, "the Little Man" appeared everywhere from the SEM Newsletter to email chains between members of the Society. The introduction of the Little Man is credited to David McAllester, who is said to have encountered the original figure at the Chicago Art Institute. The Little Man first appeared on the cover of Newsletter No. 6 in 1956 and continued to appear in the same format, minus the hyphen in the title, since then.

The controversy around the logo first surfaced in the mid-1990s. An altered image of the Little Man, featuring him holding an electric guitar instead of his usual flute, was created for the 1995 pre-conference for the annual SEM meeting. This pre-conference was held in Los Angeles and was about Music and Technoculture. While the creator, Rene Lysoff, originally received little to no negative response to using this image, the appearance of the "ethno-techno man" on the splash page of the website of the Southern California branch of SEM caused the board to question the Society had the right to use the figure of the Little Man in the first place. While the Logoistics panel on the 43rd annual SEM meeting (1998) ended up being accepted as a "counter-logo," the question as to whether it was appropriate or not for the Society to be using a figure such as the Little Man was not fully addressed. Some participants felt that this image was outdated and no longer gave an accurate representation of what it means to be an ethnomusicologist. Others felt it had nostalgic value- to them, it represented the early ages of the Society and all of the struggles and debates it took to give the discipline its current form. Even more felt a mixture of both: there needs to be a replacement logo for the Little Man figure, but he still does effectively represent the earlier eras of SEM.

By 2004, this debate came to a head. Scholars such argued that the use of the Little Man as the official logo for the Society reinforced too many negative stereotypes, and the cons of replacing the old logo were not sufficient to outweigh this. For instance, Kevin Delgado says that the Little Man evokes concepts such as "the modern who study the primitive (in our case, a naked primitive at that); the wealthy First World that studies the poorer Third World; the objectified Other; the plundered cultural artifact" (6). Following these declarations, the president of the Society at the time, Tim Rice, held a ballot to decide if SEM would keep the Little Man as their official logo. In the end, the ballot was lost 60% to 40%, and the Little Man remained the logo through the 2012 edition of the Ethnomusicology journal.

Despite this, the decision to keep the logo as-is was eventually overturned. Starting from the first part of the 2013 journal, the cover went through many noticeable changes. The Little Man no longer appears on the front and back covers of the journal. Instead, the word "ethnomusicology" is printed multiple times in semi-transparent text in the background. The font of the main title has also been changed- it is much more generic, and the title "Ethnomusicology" is all in lowercase. The reason for these changes are explained in the foreword by the editor: the SEM President Harris M. Berger held a forum where members of the Society could publish and comment on new designs for the journal, and the Council, Committee, and Board were the most in favor of the design by Dustin Hubbart and logo by John Murphy, Cullen Strawn, and Alan Burdette. The 2013 edition and those in the following years through the present day all use this same new design and logo.

== Organization ==
=== Governance ===
The society is governed by a constitution, board of directors, council members, and stands by its strict nylaws. There are several standing committees in which members can participate, ranging in size from 4 to 15 members. Some of these committees organize national events, such as the annual conference, while others operate local events, nominations, awarding of prizes, publications, and student concerns.

=== Membership ===
The society offers Individual and Institution Memberships, which offer benefits and additional resources not available to the public. Individual membership fees are determined by annual income and academic enrollment (full-time student), but also one-time lifetime memberships are also available. Members receive copies of SEM publications, such as the newsletter and journal, gain voting rights, can submit papers for meetings and conferences, can access a members-only section of the website, and receive discounts for certain databases, such as JSTOR.

== Annual conferences ==
The first official SEM meeting was September 2–9, 1956, and since then, the Society of Ethnomusicology has continued to host annual conferences throughout the country and occasionally abroad. Locations for these large-scale gatherings require a host university with a strong ethnomusicology department, hotels that can house the huge number of attendees ranging, which ranges from 800 to 1000 people, at an affordable price, and has access to air travel. Locations are typical chosen three years in advance by the SEM's board. The conference is then executed by the program committee, local arrangements committee, and business office.

The annual meetings are made up of programs, paper presentations, lectures, banquets, and special events, which include diverse performances, formal concerts, and dances. Video-streaming will be available for several paper presentations.

== Publications ==
Alongside the Ethnomusicology journal, The Society for Ethnomusicology publishes a variety of works, nearly all of which are peer-reviewed. The SEM website itself serves as a communicative and archival device, enabling members to discuss the latest news, share project updates, and gives digital access to many of the print publications. The SEM website offers free access to the last fifteen issues of the journal (currently volumes 43–57 from 1999 to 2013), the student newsletter, and on-going lists of Ographies, including bibliographies, discographies, and dissertations. Issues of the SEM Newsletter are also available from between 2002 and 2010, volumes 36–44, however, the latest digital copies are only available to members. A full list of SEM's publications are available through the website.

== Prizes ==
SEM awards prizes on national, chapter, and sectional levels. These awards are designed to recognize the work of individuals in the field of ethnomusicology. Awards vary in purpose, financial prize (if any), eligibility, where and how often the prize is awarded, and application deadline.

== See also ==
- Patricia Shehan Campbell
- John Blacking
