= Jaap Kunst =

Dutch ethnomusicologist (1891–1960)

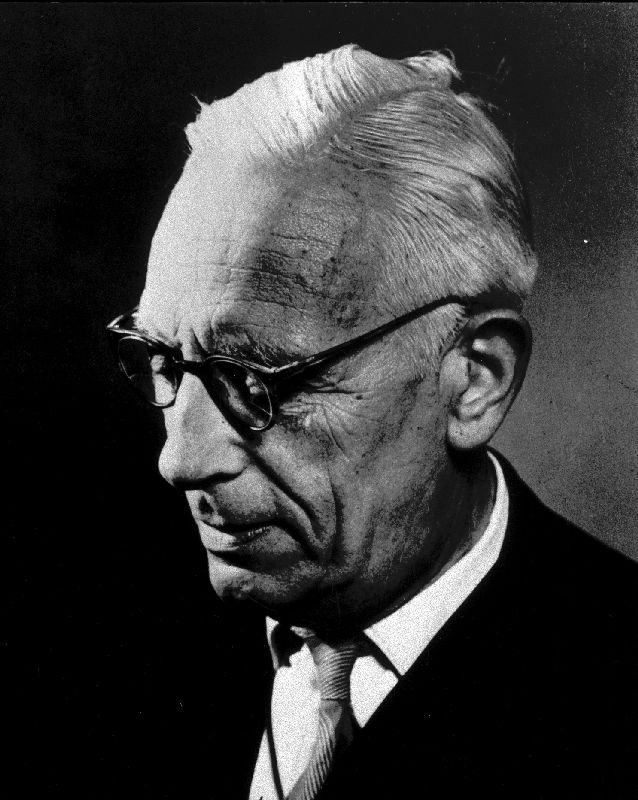
- Portrait of Kunst in 1950
- Born: 12 August 1891; Groningen, Netherlands
- Died: 7 December 1960 (aged 69); Amsterdam, Netherlands
- Occupation: Ethnomusicologist
- Spouse: Kathy van Wely (m. 1921)

Jaap Kunst (12 August 1891 – 7 December 1960) was a Dutch musicologist. He is credited with steering the discipline away from exclusively comparative methods and into the direction of historical particularism, coining the term "ethno-musicology" as a more accurate name for the field then known as comparative musicology.

Kunst studied the folk music of the Netherlands and his field studies in Indonesia between 1920 and 1934 are seen as fundamental contributions to the knowledge and understanding of Indonesian folk music. His published work totals more than 70 texts.

== Early life ==
Kunst was born on 12 August 1891 in Groningen. Both of his parents were pianists, and his father was a music-school teacher and music critic. He began to study the violin at only 5 years old, and continued to play the instrument throughout his life. Kunst was drawn toward folk music as a result of vacations to the island of Terschelling.

Kunst decided to pursue a career in law. While studying law at the University of Groningen, Kunst published the results of his first musical research in 1915. Kunst graduated in 1917 and pursued a career in banking and law for the next two years. However, he soon grew tired of this work.

== Career ==
=== Work in Indonesia ===
In 1919, Kunst set out on a tour of the Dutch East Indies with a recently formed musical trio. This group performed 95 times throughout Indonesia. Kunst heard a gamelan ensemble for the first time at the Paku Alaman palace in Yogyakarta. Impressed, he decided to remain in Java to study Indonesian music, while the other members of his trio departed. Taking a job as an official in the colonial government, Kunst remained in Java for fifteen years. He married Kathy van Wely in 1921; she became a partner in Kunst's work.

Kunst was the first person to record gamelan music on wax cylinders. He amassed an archive of photographs, recordings, and instruments of Indonesian music. He ceded much of his collection to the Koninklijk Bataviaasch Genootschap van Kunsten en Wetenschappen (now the National Museum of Indonesia).

=== Later activities ===
In 1934, Kunst returned to the Netherlands, and he became the curator of Amsterdam's Colonial Museum (now the Royal Tropical Institute) in 1936. Later, he became a lecturer at the University of Amsterdam.

Kunst first used the term "ethno-musicology" in his 1950 publication Musicologica. He stated:

The name of our science is, in fact, not quite characteristic; it does not 'compare' any more than any other science. A better name, therefore, is that appearing on the title page of this book: ethno-musicology.

Ethnomusicology (with no hyphen) quickly replaced comparative musicology as the name of the field. This usage was influenced by the formation of the Society for Ethnomusicology in 1955.

In 1956, Kunst released a bestselling album of folk songs, on Folkways Records, entitled Living Folksongs and Dance-Tunes from the Netherlands.

Kunst died in 1960 of throat cancer in Amsterdam.

== Ideas ==
Kunst believed musical study must take into account the cultural context of its creation. In his view, musicology was incomplete without ethnographic elements. A sentiment shared by other ethnomusicologists such as Alan P. Merriam. Contrary to mainstream European scholarship at the time, Kunst believed that music from other continents was no less sophisticated than the music of Europe, and he often argued this point against others.

== Legacy ==
Since 1965, the Society for Ethnomusicology has offered an annual prize named after Kunst. Until 2018, the prize honored the most significant ethnomusicological article of the previous year by a society member. From 2019 onward, only researchers in their first 10 years of scholarship are eligible for the prize.

== Writings ==
- with C. Kunst-van Wely. De Toonkunst van Bali. (Weltevreden, 1924; part 2 in Tijdschrift voor Indische taal-, land-, en volkenkunde, LXV, Batavia, 1925)
- with R. Goris. Hindoe-Javaansche muziekinstrumenten. (Batavia, 1927; 2nd ed., revised, Hindu-Javanese Musical Instruments, 1968)
- A Study on Papuan Music (Weltevreden, 1931)
- Musicologisch onderzoek 1931 (Batavia, 1931)
- Over zeldzame fluiten en veelstemmige muziek in het Ngada- en Nagehgebied, West-Flores (Batavia, 1931)
- De toonkunst van Java (The Hague, 1934; English translation, Music in Java, 1949; 3rd ed., expanded, 1973)
- Een en ander over den Javaanschen gamelan (Amsterdam, 1940; 4th ed. 1945)
- Music in Flores: A Study of the Vocal and Instrumental Music Among the Tribes Living in Flores (Leiden, 1942)
- Music in Nias (Leiden, 1942)
- Around von Hornbostel's Theory of the Cycle of Blown Fifths (Amsterdam, 1948)
- The Cultural Background of Indonesian Music (Amsterdam, 1949)
- Begdja, het gamelanjongetje (Amsterdam, 1950)
- De inheemsche muziek in Westelijk Nieuw-Guinea (Amsterdam, 1950)
- Metre, Rhythm, and Multi-part Music (Leiden, 1950)
- Musicologica: A Study of the Nature of Ethnomusicology, Its Problems, Methods, and Representative Personalities (Amsterdam, 1950; 2nd ed., expanded, retitled Ethnomusicology, 1955; 3rd ed. 1959)
- Kultur-historische Beziehungen zwischen dem Balkan und Indonesien (Amsterdam, 1953, English translation, 1954)
- Sociologische bindingen in de muziek (The Hague, 1953)
