= Grant, Ohio =

Unincorporated community in Ohio, U.S.

Coordinates: 40°42′38″N 83°34′05″W

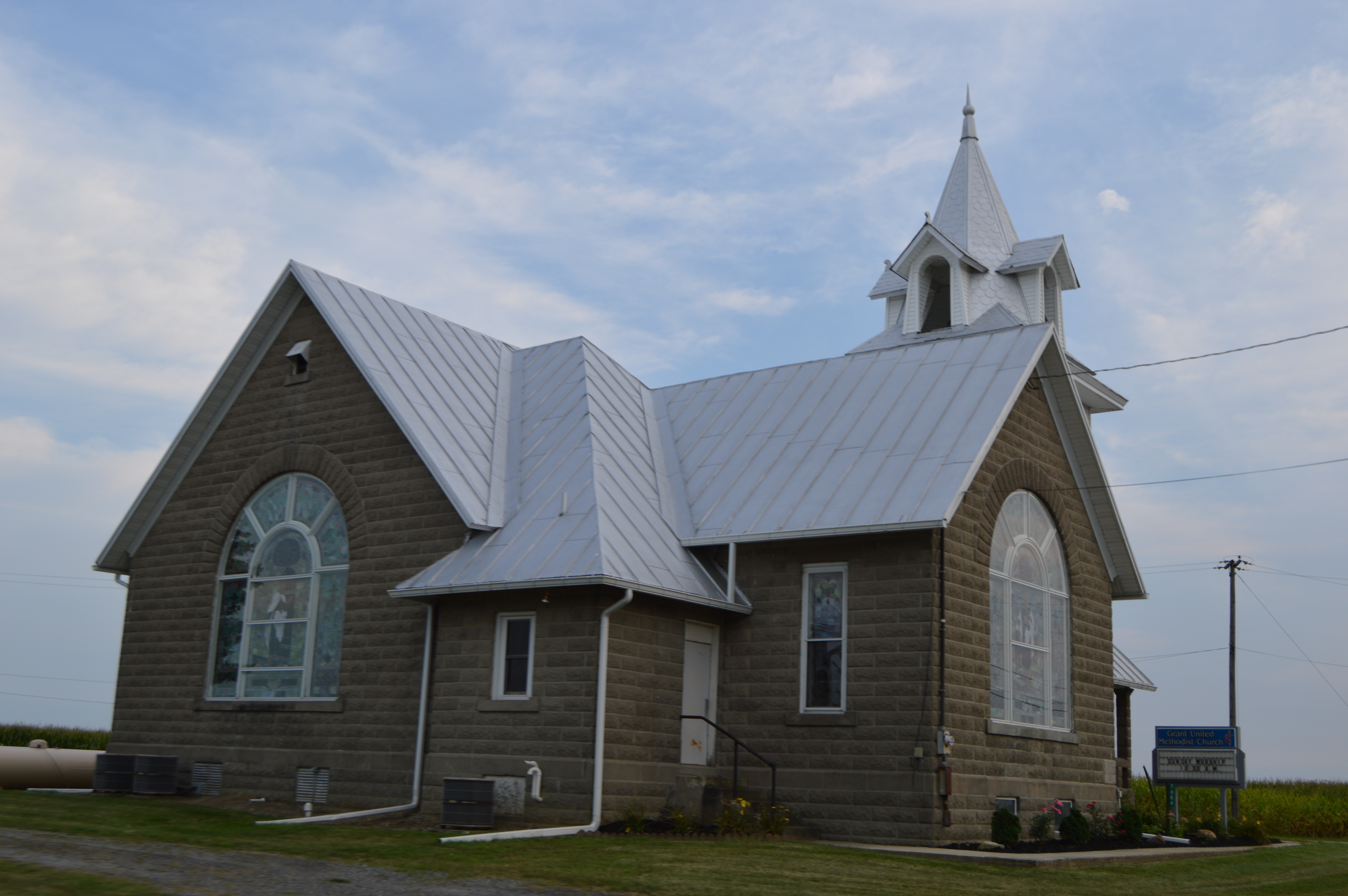
Methodist church

Grant is an unincorporated community in Hardin County, in the U.S. state of Ohio.

== History ==
A post office called Grant was established in 1863, and remained in operation until 1913. The community was named for General Ulysses S. Grant, afterward 18th President of the United States.
