= Dean Pees =

American football coach (born 1949)

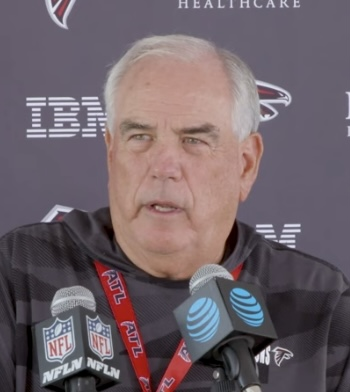
- Pees with the Atlanta Falcons in 2021

Baltimore Ravens
- Title: Senior advisor

Personal information
- Born: September 4, 1949 (age 77); Dunkirk, Ohio, U.S.

Career information
- College: Bowling Green

Career history
- Elmwood HS (OH) (1973–1978); Defensive coordinator (1973–1974); Head coach (1975–1978); Findlay (1979–1982) Defensive coordinator & secondary coach; Miami (OH) (1983–1986) Defensive coordinator & secondary coach; Navy (1987–1989) Secondary coach; Toledo (1990–1993) Defensive coordinator; Notre Dame (1994) Secondary coach; Michigan State (1995–1997) Defensive coordinator & inside linebackers coach; Kent State (1998–2003) Head coach; New England Patriots (2004–2009); Linebackers coach (2004–2005); Defensive coordinator (2006–2009); Baltimore Ravens (2010–2017); Inside linebackers coach (2010–2011); Defensive coordinator (2012–2017); Tennessee Titans (2018–2019) Defensive coordinator; Atlanta Falcons (2021–2022) Defensive coordinator; Baltimore Ravens (2024–present) Senior advisor

Awards and highlights
- 2× Super Bowl champion (XXXIX, XLVII)

Head coaching record
- Regular season: NCAA: 17–51 (.250)
- Coaching profile at Pro Football Reference

Russell Dean Pees (born September 4, 1949) is an American football coach who is a senior advisor for the Baltimore Ravens of the National Football League (NFL). He was the defensive coordinator for the Ravens, New England Patriots, Tennessee Titans, and Atlanta Falcons. Pees was also the head coach at Kent State University from 1998 to 2003, compiling a record of 17–51.

== Coaching career ==
=== College football ===
Pees began his coaching career at Elmwood High School in Bloomdale, Ohio. After being the defensive coordinator for two years, he got the head coaching position. A few years later, Pees was hired to start his college coaching career in 1979 at the University of Findlay as their defensive coordinator and secondary coach following six years as a high school coach. In 1983, Pees moved to Miami University, where he was also the defensive coordinator and secondary coach of the team. From 1987 to 1989, Pees was the secondary coach at the United States Naval Academy. Pees then took the defensive coordinator job, under Nick Saban, at the University of Toledo, which he held for four seasons with the team. Pees spent the 1994 season under head coach Lou Holtz as the secondary coach for the University of Notre Dame. From 1995 to 1997, Pees worked as the defensive coordinator and inside linebackers coach again under Saban at Michigan State University. In 1998, he earned his first head coaching job at Kent State University. Pees left the program after the 2003 season with a six-year record of 17–51.

=== NFL ===
==== New England Patriots ====
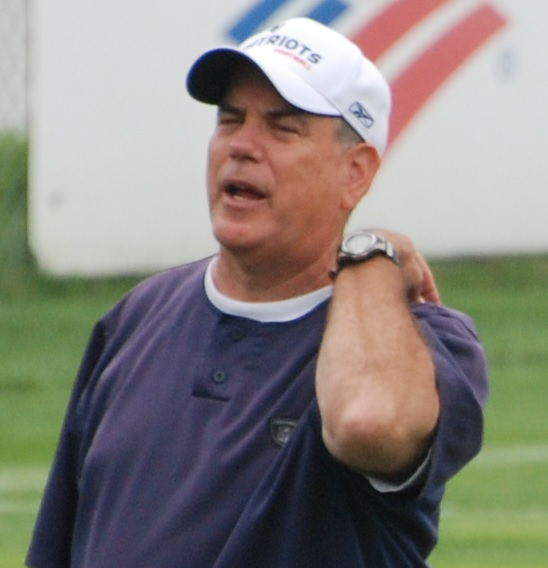
Pees in 2009

Prior to the 2004 NFL season, Pees left Kent State for the Patriots, spending two years as the Patriots' linebackers coach under head coach Bill Belichick, another Saban associate. Pees had coached alongside Bill's father, Steve Belichick, at Navy in the late 1980s.

After the 2005 season, Pees was promoted to defensive coordinator, replacing Eric Mangini, who became the head coach of the New York Jets. With his contract set to expire following the 2009 season, Pees chose not to return to the Patriots on January 14, 2010.

==== Baltimore Ravens (first stint) ====
On January 26, 2010, Pees was hired as the linebackers coach for the Baltimore Ravens. On January 27, 2012, Pees was promoted to defensive coordinator by head coach John Harbaugh. Pees was on the coaching staff that won Super Bowl XLVII. Pees announced his retirement on January 1, 2018.

==== Tennessee Titans ====
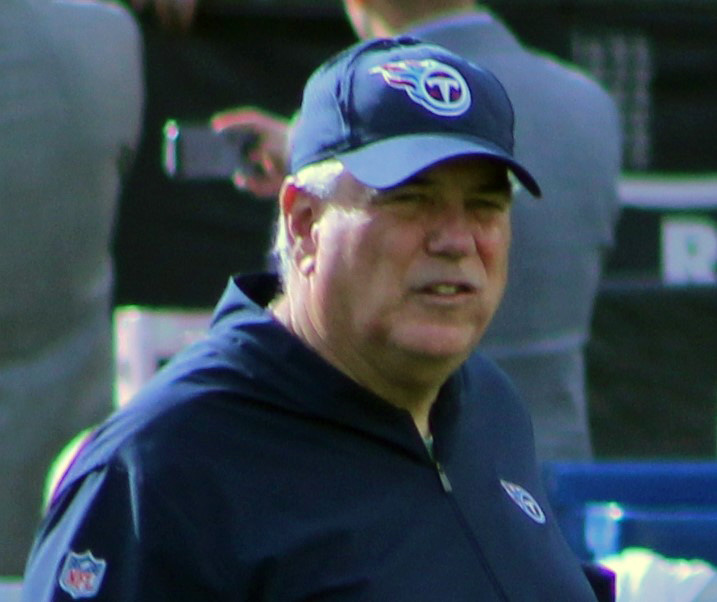
Pees in 2019

On January 29, 2018, Pees was hired as the defensive coordinator for the Tennessee Titans under head coach Mike Vrabel.

On January 20, 2020, Pees announced his retirement from football for the second time.

==== Atlanta Falcons ====
On January 21, 2021, Pees was hired by the Atlanta Falcons as their defensive coordinator under head coach Arthur Smith.

On January 9, 2023, Pees announced his retirement from football for the third time.

==== Baltimore Ravens (second stint) ====
On October 9, 2024, the Baltimore Ravens hired Pees as a senior advisor to defensive coordinator Zach Orr.

== Personal life ==
Pees' son, Matt, is a defensive analyst for the Chicago Bears. They previously worked together on the Titans and Falcons, where Matt was a quality control coach and defensive assistant, respectively, under his father.

== Head coaching record ==
Year	Team	Overall	Conference	Standing	Bowl/playoffs
Kent State Golden Flashes (Mid-American Conference) (1998–2003)
1998	Kent State	0–11	0–8	6th (East)	
1999	Kent State	2–9	2–6	6th (East)	
2000	Kent State	1–10	1–7	7th (East)	
2001	Kent State	6–5	5–3	T–4th (East)	
2002	Kent State	3–9	1–7	6th (East)	
2003	Kent State	5–7	4–4	4th (East)	
Kent State:		17–51	13–35		
Total:		17–51			
