= Foraker, Ohio =

Unincorporated community in Ohio, U.S.

Coordinates: 40°40′39″N 83°44′30″W

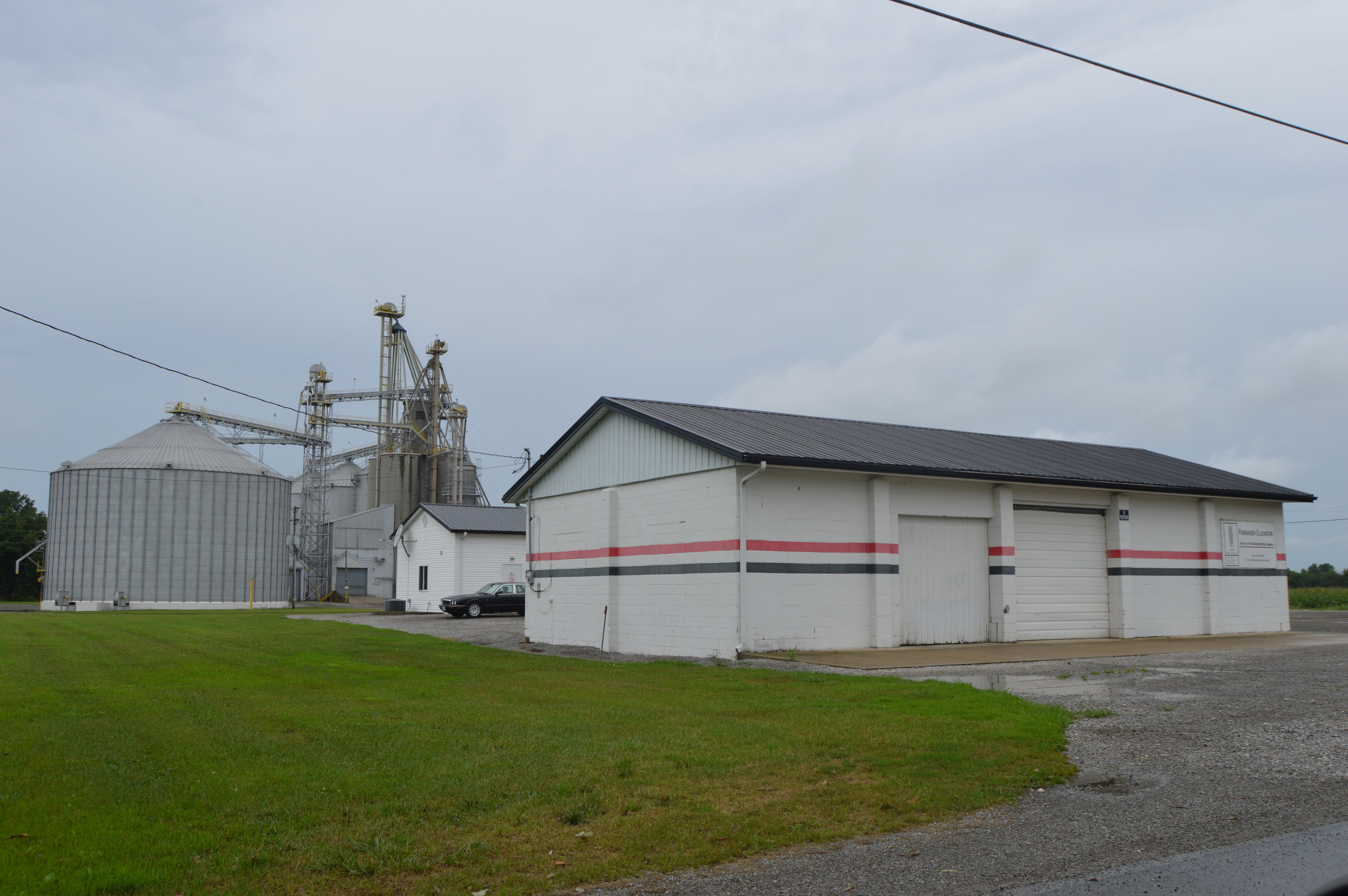
Grain elevator

Foraker is an unincorporated community in Hardin County, in the U.S. state of Ohio.

== History ==
Foraker was originally called Oakland, and under the latter name was laid out in 1886. The present name is for Joseph B. Foraker, 37th Governor of Ohio. A post office called Foraker was established in 1883, and remained in operation until 1941.
