= Willard Rhodes =

American ethnomusicologist (1901-1992)

- Born: May 12, 1901; Deshler, Ohio, U.S.
- Died: May 15, 1992 (aged 90–91); Sun City, Arizona, U.S.
- Education: Heidelberg University; Wittenberg University; Columbia University
- Occupation: Ethnomusicologist

Willard Nile Rhodes (May 12, 1901 – May 15, 1992) was an American ethnomusicologist and scholar. He is known as the first president of the Society for Ethnomusicology for his extensive recording of American Indian music between 1939 and 1952.

== Biography ==
Rhodes was born on May 12, 1901 in Deshler, Ohio, the eldest of three children to John O. and Lulu Mae Rhodes (née Sheeley). He grew up in Dunkirk, Ohio regularly attending church services as a choral director. His father conducted hymns and his mother performed as a church pianist and organist and teacher. Rhodes learned both the piano and violin growing up.

He graduated Tiffin High School at 16 and received A.B. and Bachelor of Music degrees from Heidelberg University in Tiffin, Ohio in 1922, studying a year at Wittenberg University in Springfield, Ohio and then the Mannes School of Music in New York 1923-1925. A few years later, he received an M.A. from Columbia University in 1929 from a scholarship. He also received a scholarship to study in Paris with Nadia Boulanger. While there, he worked as a composer and wrote a song for singer Josephine Baker, beginning a long career with opera music.

== Scholarship and Fieldwork ==
For several years, Rhodes was a choir master and conductor for the American Opera Company and also assistant conductor of the Cincinnati Summer Opera Company.

From 1937 to 1969, he served as a professor at Columbia University, where he founded the graduate program in ethnomusicology and directed the Opera Workshop. He later co-founded the Society for Ethnomusicology in 1953 along with David McAllester and Alan Merriam, serving as the organization's first president.

While teaching at Columbia, Rhodes and Willard Walcott Beatty, director of education in the Bureau of Indian Affairs began systematically planning a series of recordings of different American Indian tribes and their music so they could be preserved and studied. Most notably, his work on Sioux and Navajo music was published and preserved through Smithsonian Folkways.

His many field recordings have been released by Folkways Records and the Library of Congress Recording Laboratory. Later in his career, he also conducted field recording in Zimbabwe, Nigeria, and India, recording 126 tapes between 1959 and 1974. Additionally, a collection of Rhodes' recordings and other materials is held by the Library of Congress. Because of his extensive work documenting a selection of American Indian music, Rhodes chose the "Navajo Night Chant" for inclusion on the Voyager Golden Record (1977).

== Personal Life and Death ==
Rhodes met his future wife, Lillian Hansen Martin, while she was working as an executive secretary to Harold Fowler McCormick, well-known as a music patron. They married in 1940 and he adopted her daughter, Joy from a previous marriage.

His brother, Wendell Rhodes also played music, but went on to become Chair of Anthropology at SUNY Geneseo.
