= Grassy Point, Ohio =

Unincorporated community in Ohio, U.S.

Coordinates: 40°33′33″N 83°35′13″W

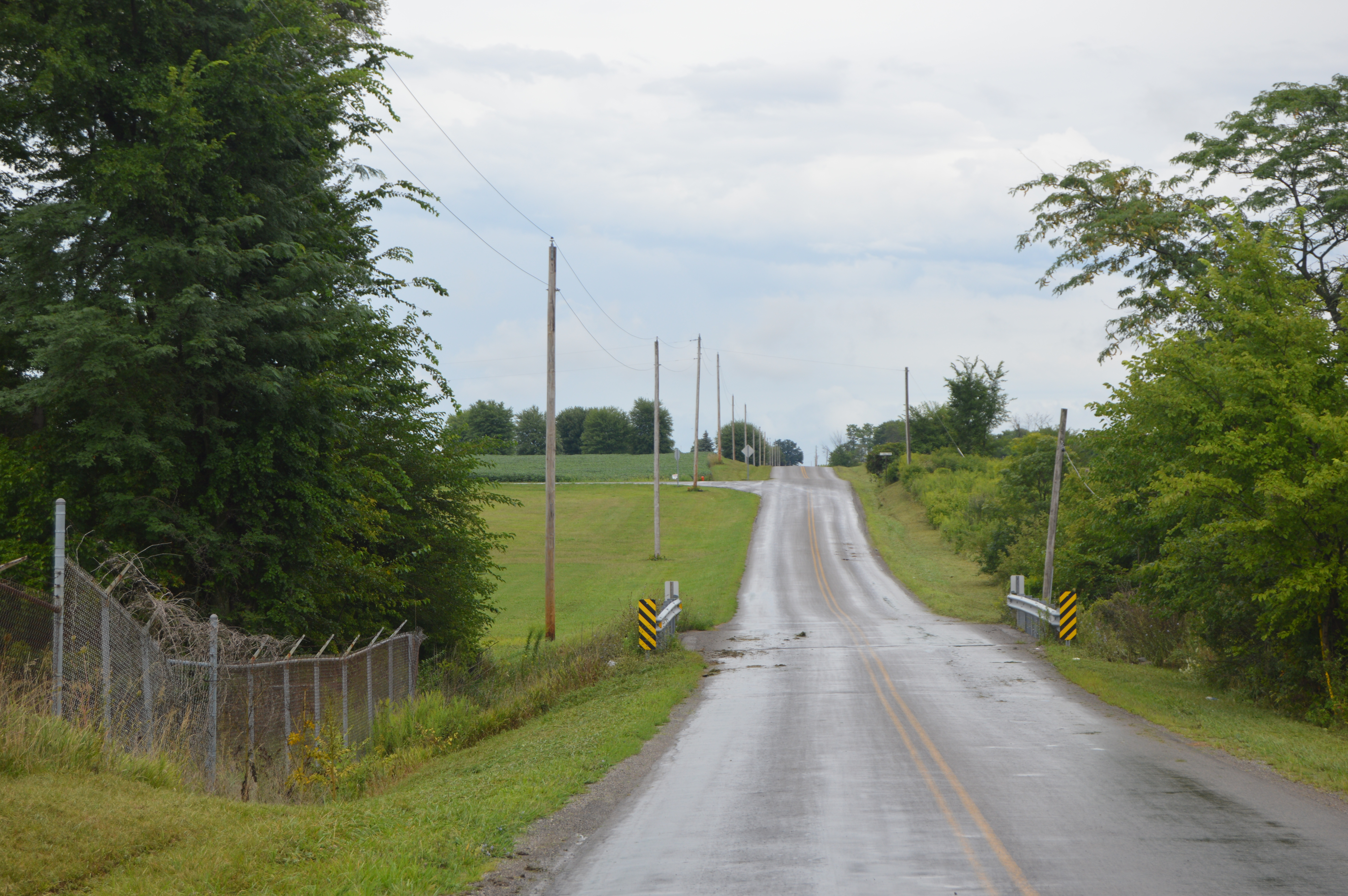
Overview of the townsite

Grassy Point is an unincorporated community in Hardin County, in the U.S. state of Ohio.

== History ==
Grassy Point started as a pioneer trading post and was named for the cleared but grassy condition of the original site. A post office called Grassy Point was established in 1840, and closed in 1841.
