= Foraker (surname) =

Foraker is a surname. Notable people with the surname include:

- Eleanor Foraker (1930–2011), American seamstress
- Joseph B. Foraker (1846–1917), Governor of Ohio and U.S. senator
- Lois Foraker (fl. 1971–2001), American actress
