= Pfeiffer, Ohio =

Unincorporated community in Ohio, U.S.

Coordinates: 40°37′20″N 83°29′52″W

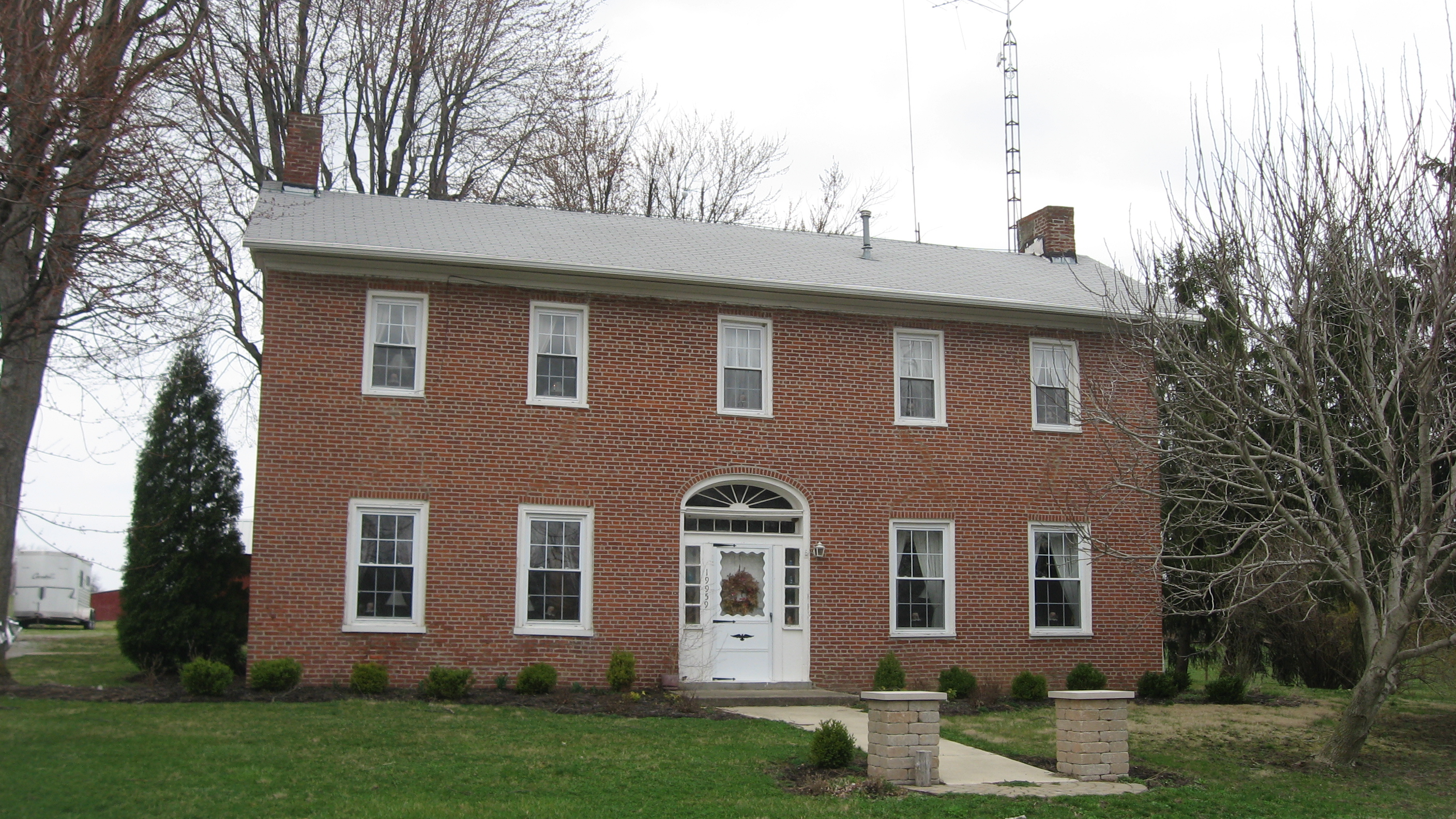
Wheeler Tavern, built 1835

Pfeiffer is an unincorporated community in Hardin County, in the U.S. state of Ohio.

== History ==
Pfeiffer had its start in 1883 when the railroad was extended to that point. John Pfeiffer, an early postmaster, gave the community his last name. A post office was established at Pfeiffer in 1883, and remained in operation until 1906.
