= Pfeiffer House =

Pfeiffer House may refer to:

- Pfeiffer House, Charters Towers, a heritage-listed house in Queensland, Australia
- Pfeiffer House (Pfeiffer, Arkansas), listed on the NRHP in Arkansas
- Pfeiffer House and Carriage House, Piggott, AR, listed on the NRHP in Arkansas
- Netcott-Pfeiffer House, Parkersburg, IA, listed on the NRHP in Iowa
- John Gottlieb Pfeiffer House, Faribault, MN, listed on the NRHP in Minnesota
- Pfeiffer-Wheeler American Chestnut Cabin, Portville, NY, listed on the NRHP in New York
