= Silver Creek, Ohio =

Unincorporated community in Ohio, U.S.

Coordinates: 40°34′35″N 83°40′42″W

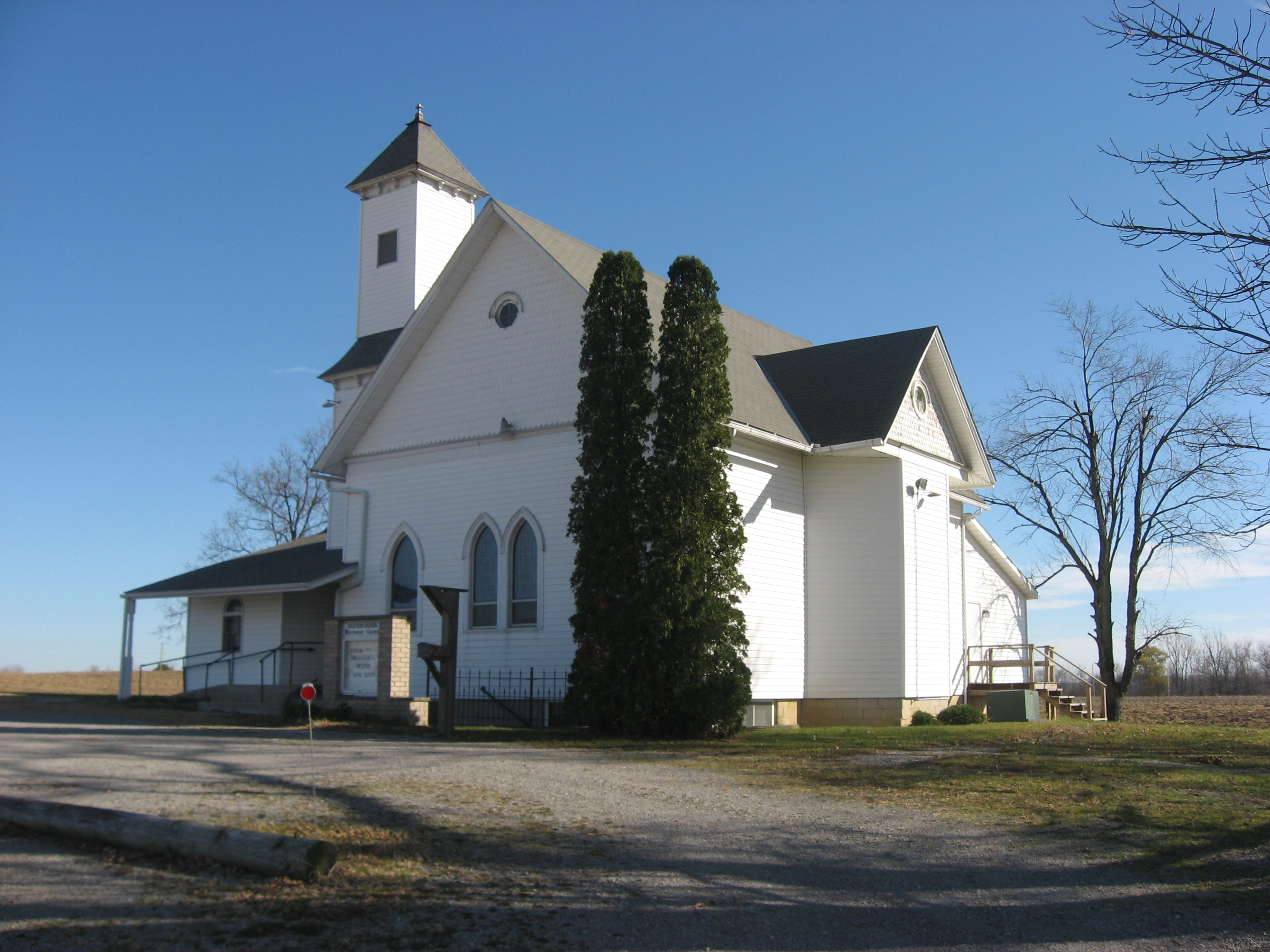
Methodist church

Silver Creek is an unincorporated community in Hardin County, in the U.S. state of Ohio.

== History ==
Silver Creek was originally called Hudsonville, and under the latter name had its start in 1846 when the railroad was extended to that point. A post office called Silver Creek was established in 1864, and remained in operation until 1995.
