= Carl A. Pfeiffer =

Piano manufacturing company in Germany

Carl A. Pfeiffer GmbH & Co. KG
- Company type: Private
- Industry: Musical instruments
- Founded: 1861; 165 years ago
- Founder: Joseph Anton Pfeiffer
- Headquarters: Stuttgart, Germany
- Products: Pianos
- Website: pfeiffer-pianos.com/en

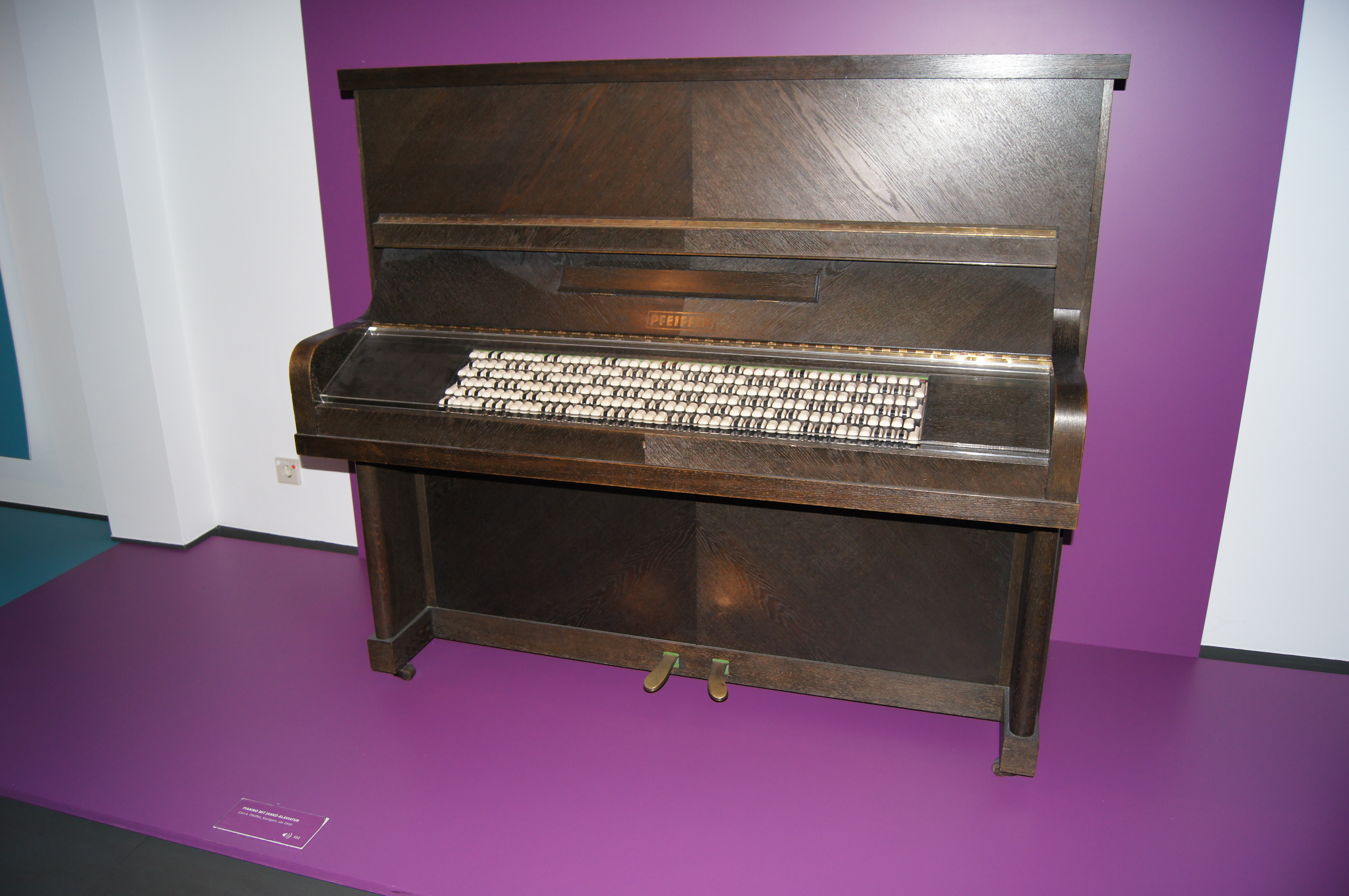
Piano manufactured by Pfeiffer

Carl A. Pfeiffer GmbH & Co. KG is a German piano-manufacturing company in Leonberg, Böblingen (district). The company was founded in Stuttgart in 1862 by Joseph Anton Pfeiffer. His father Carl A. Pfeiffer was already working as a piano maker in Glogau. The latter built the first double grand piano with a double soundboard. Today, the company is in its fifth generation of family ownership.

== History ==
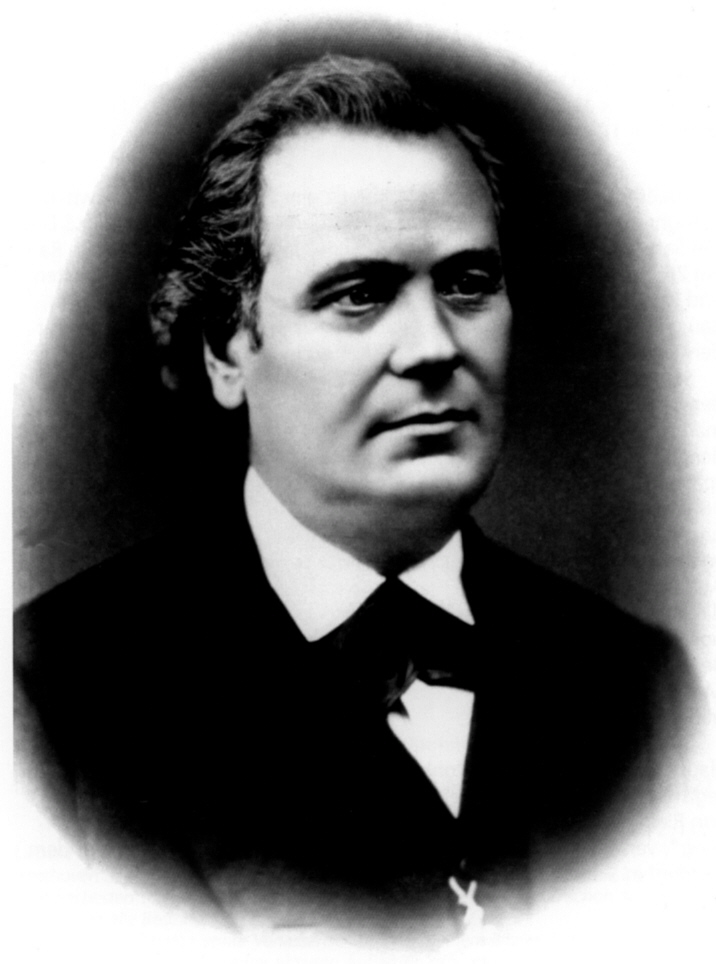
Joseph A. Pfeiffer

The company was established in 1861 in Stuttgart, Germany by Joseph Anton Pfeiffer. In 1912, the company was renamed as the Carl A. Pfeiffer company and in 1994, the company moved to is current location in Leonberg. The annual production is about 10 grand pianos and 100 uprights (as of 2005).

== Current models ==
Grand pianos
Model	Length
191	191 cm

Upright pianos
Model	Height
114	114 cm
118	118 cm
124	124 cm
