= Alan P. Merriam =

American ethnomusicologist

- Alan Merriam
- Born: November 1, 1923; Missoula, Montana
- Died: March 14, 1980 (aged 56); Warsaw, Poland
- Education: Northwestern University (Ph.D., 1951)
- Known for: Study of music in Central Africa, Native America, music and anthropology.
- Scientific career
- Fields: Ethnomusicology
- Workplaces: Indiana University
- Thesis: (1951)
- Doctoral advisor: Melville J. Herskovits, Richard A. Waterman

Alan Parkhurst Merriam (1 November 1923 – 14 March 1980) was an American ethnomusicologist known for his studies of music in Native America and Africa. In his book The Anthropology of Music (1964), he outlined and develops a theory and method for studying music from an anthropological perspective with anthropological methods. Although he taught at Northwestern University and University of Wisconsin, the majority of his academic career was spent at Indiana University where he was named a professor in 1962 and then chairman of the anthropology department from 1966 to 1969, which became a leading center of ethnomusicology research under his guidance. He was a co-founder of the Society for Ethnomusicology in 1952 and held the elected post of president of that society from 1963 to 1965. He edited the Newsletter of the Society for Ethnomusicology from 1952 to 1957, and he edited the journal Ethnomusicology from 1957 to 1958.

Merriam's initial work was based on fieldwork carried out in his native Montana and central Africa. He undertook extensive field research among the Flathead Indians of Montana in 1950 (for his PhD) and again in 1958. In Africa, he studied with the Songye and Bashi people of Zaïre (now the Democratic Republic of Congo) and Burundi in the 1950s and again in 1973. Later, Merriam proposed a tripartite model for the study of ethnomusicology, centering on the study of "music in culture." This model suggested that music should be studied on three analytic levels: conceptualization about music; behavior in relation to music; and analysis of music's sounds.

Merriam died in the crash of LOT Polish Airlines Flight 007 on March 14, 1980.

== Early life and education ==
Born to a highly musical household in Missoula, Montana, Merriam began studying piano and clarinet at a young age. His father was the Chairman of the English department at the University of Montana, and his mother was a highly skilled cellist. During his younger years, Merriam performed in numerous school bands and local dance orchestras.

Merriam studied music at the University of Montana ('47) and began graduate work in anthropology at Northwestern University ('48) where he became acquainted with the anthropologist Melville J. Herskovits, who "stimulated his interest in the study of music as a cultural phenomenon." Merriam went on to complete a doctorate in anthropology, his dissertation titled "Songs of the Afro-Bahian Cults: An Ethnomusicological Analysis." This dissertation was significant to the field of Ethnomusicology, because it was the first instance of the word "ethnomusicology" being used as a noun, marking a shift away from the adverbial usage of the phrase "comparative musicology."

== Merriam as an Ethnomusicologist ==
Due to its nature as a field at the intersection of several disciplines, ethnomusicology takes on many forms and is viewed through many lenses, highly dependent on the goals and background of the ethnomusicologist. With training as an anthropologist, Merriam was a member of the anthropology school of ethnomusicology. Along with the musicology school, these two factions of ethnomusicology make up a large population in the world of ethnomusicology and they are often at odds. His heavy association with the anthropology school of ethnomusicology had resulted in his views on the various issues plaguing ethnomusicology to considered representative of the attitudes and views of the anthropology school. Issues that Merriam has weighed on in heavily in his opinion pieces are the way the field had been and should be defined and the directions it was taking during his lifetime.

On defining ethnomusicology, Merriam draws on his background as an anthropologist to surmise that as a field ethnomusicology should aim to study "music in culture." Merriam emphasizes that

"In other words I believe that music can be studied not only from the standpoint of musicians and humanists, but from that of social scientists as well, and that, further, it is at the moment from the field of cultural anthropology that our primary stimulation is coming for the study of music as a universal aspect of man's activities."

to further his argument that ethnomusicology must continue its transition into the study of broader issues by removing focus from the study of musical objects. He continued his efforts to arrive at a more accurate definition of ethnomusicology by later suggesting that music was the study of "music as culture." The distinction between these two approaches to define ethnomusicology lie in how culture is treated relative to the study of music. The approach of studying "music in culture" assumes that culture is a complex quality inherent to any society and music exists as a component of that quality. Treating "music as culture" conceives culture not as an object with comments but as a fluid construct and that methods of understanding it can be applied to understanding music. Merriam's idea of how ethnomusicology should be defined drew from his idea of what an ethnomusicologist should accomplish. Merriam had, like all ethnomusicologists, completed fieldwork in his area of interest, but he was characterized by his peers in ethnomusicology as being more scientific and focusing on drawing conclusion from data. In his own writings, he emphasizes the application of data gathered in the field to solving relevant musical problems and how such application is motivated by the approach and goal of the researcher. Further, he claims the indispensable link between the data gathered in the field and the conclusions drawn from it by proposing his opinion on "armchair ethnomusicologists":

"The day of the "armchair ethnomusicologist" who sits in the laboratory and analyzes the music that others have recorded…is fast passing in our discipline. I do not deny the contribution of such a specialist in the past, nor in the future, but his role is becoming progressively smaller, and rightly so, for method and theory are inseparable in the gathering of data, and the descriptive phase of our study in which we treat simply structural facts is giving way before the broader interpretations."

Merriam is characterized by a drive to solve relevant problems using data gathered in the field hands-on. An individual that stood as a foil to him was his fellow ethnomusicologist, Mantle Hood. A member of the musicology school of ethnomusicology, Hood was known for initiating an important ethnomusicology graduate program at UCLA. This graduate program was centered on bimusicality or "international musicianship," the practice in graduate ethnomusicology where students should make the effort to become proficient in musical traditions outside of their own. His program emphasized learning to listen and hear without prejudice or ethnocentricity, rhythmic and tonal fluency outside of the Western tradition, and performance experience in non-Western vocal and instrumental performance with the last being what his program is most known for. These two ethnomusicologists in practice emphasized different things in what they believed ethnomusicology should accomplish. Hood was more interested in creating a graduate student body that could accomplish the egalitarian purpose of ethnomusicology in spreading world musics and preserving them. In contrast, Merriam's priorities lay in proposing a theoretical framework (as he does in The Anthropology of Music) for studying musical data and using that analysis for application towards solving musical problems.

Merriam's contribution to ethnomusicology was felt past his death but especially in the works of Tim Rice of UCLA in the 1980s as he himself was trying to propose a more composed and exact model for conducting work in ethnomusicology. He deconstructed Merriam's method as stated in The Anthropology of Music and described it as consisting of three analytical levels. This simplified model was used by Rice as a foil to the method he was proposing, consistently referencing how his model furthered things accomplished by the Merriam model.

== The Anthropology of Music ==
The purpose of this book is to create a better understanding of the anthropological aspects of music, defining ethnomusicology as not the study of the music of non-western cultures, but instead as the study of the relationship which music bears to society. Merriam claims the goals of ethnomusicology cannot be realized by considering music to be an object separate from the humans which make it, and therefore argues for the sake of an anthropology of music. Studying just the music as an object, Merriam argues, is counterintuitive to the goals of ethnomusicology, excluding a very important aspect of ethnomusicology, which is music's intrinsic ties to the ways humans act. Articulating this relationship, Merriam states,

"Music sound cannot be produced except by people for other people, and although we can separate the two aspects conceptually, one is not really complete without the other. Human behavior produces music, but the process is one of continuity; the behavior itself is shaped to produce music sound, and thus the study of one flows into the other".

Ethnomusicology, Merriam posits, "has most often been made in terms of what [musicology] encompasses," being that the realms of musicology and ethnomusicology are exclusive to one another, and ethnomusicology has simply been relayed as being what musicology is not. Moving towards a clearer definition of ethnomusicology, Merriam writes that ethnomusicology "makes its unique contribution in welding together aspects of the social sciences and aspects of the humanities in such a way that each complements the other and leads to a fuller understanding of both. Neither should be considered as an end in itself; the two must be joined into a wider understanding."

This definition of ethnomusicology comes in response to a number of other important ethnomusicology authors, such as Jaap Kunst, who defined ethnomusicology via the types of music studied in the field,

"The study-object of ethnomusicology, or, as it originally was called: comparative musicology, is the traditional music and musical instruments of all cultural strata of mankind, from the so-called primitive peoples to the civilized nations. Our science, therefore, investigates all tribal and folk music and every kind of non-Western art music."

Merriam's own definition of ethnomusicology concerns a more general idea set with which the field of ethnomusicology is concerned with. In his own words, he defines it simply as "the study of music in culture" (cite Merriam's 1960 work here). This definition embodies the purpose of the entirety of The Anthropology of Music, being that ethnomusicology is not weighed further in favor of the ethnological or musicological, but instead an inseparable amalgamation of the two.

Another aspect of ethnomusicology which Merriam sought to make clear in The Anthropology of Music is the overarching goal of the field of ethnomusicology. Merriam claims, "There is no denial of the basic aim, which is to understand music; but neither is there an acceptance of a point of view which has long taken ascendancy in ethnomusicology, that the ultimate aim of our discipline is the understanding of music sound alone." This harkens back to the difficulties in ethnomusicology's past priorities, which were simply the understanding of sound as an object in and of itself, and almost no emphasis was placed on the relationship music had with the cultures it existed in. Merriam divides his stated goals of ethnomusicology into three different approaches, the first being the appreciation of the music of other cultures. Many ethnomusicologists, Merriam asserts, are under the impression that the music of many non-western cultures are either abused or neglected, and that they are worthy of appreciation in western society the same way western music is appreciated. Merriam's second listed goal of ethnomusicology is the preservation of the music of these cultures, a transformative phenomenon Merriam describes as "a constant factor in human experience." The third perceived goal concerns a more general fascination with the use of music as a form of communication among humans, and the study of music in the various ways people use it to communicate will enable a better understanding of human communication in general. Merriam's own take on this perception is stated as "The problem of understanding has not always been well understood…the study of music as a means of communication, then, is far more complex than it might appear, for we do not know what precisely music communicates, or how it communicates it."

== Select bibliography ==
=== Primary works ===
- Merriam, Alan P. (1964). The Anthropology of Music. Northwestern Univ. Press.
- Merriam, Alan P. (1967). Ethnomusicology of the Flathead Indians. Viking Fund publications in anthropology, no.44. Chicago: Aldine.
- Merriam, Alan P. (1974). An African world: the Basongye village of Lupupa Ngye. Indiana Univ. Press.

=== Secondary works ===
- Wendt, Carolyn Card, ed. (1981). Discourse in Ethnomusicology II: A Tribute to Alan Merriam. Bloomington, Indiana: Ethnomusicology Publications Group. OCLC 7926583.
- Nettl, Bruno (2001). "Merriam, Alan P.". The New Grove Dictionary of Music and Musicians. London: MacMillan.
