= Northwest Central Conference =

Athletic league in Ohio, United States

The Northwest Central Conference is an Ohio High School Athletic Association (OHSAA) athletic league located in parts of northwest and western Ohio. The league came into existence in the 2001–2002 school year. The NWCC supports 10 league sports: boys and girls cross country, boys golf, football, volleyball, boys and girls basketball, baseball, and softball.

== Current members ==
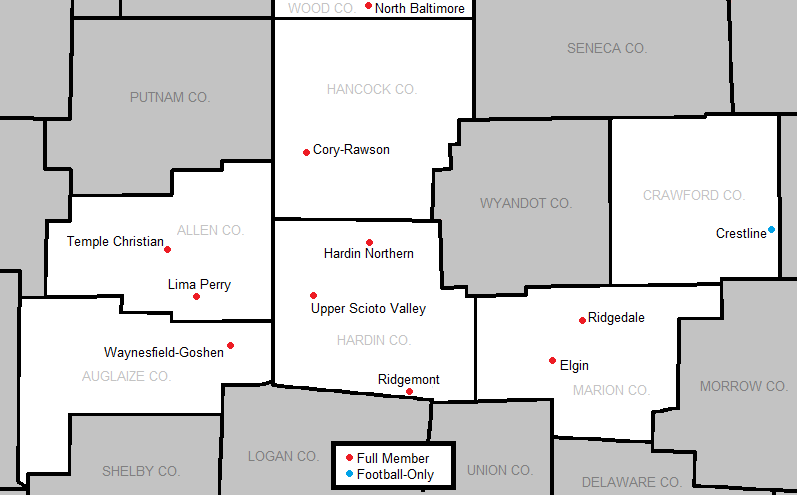
The member schools of the Northwest Central Conference for 2017–18.

School	Nickname	Location	Enrollment (CB/FB 2024)	State Football Region (2024)	Colors	Joined
Cory-Rawson	Hornets	Rawson	71	7:26	Green, Gold	2023
Elgin	Comets	Marion (Big Island Twp.)	153	6:23	Scarlet, Gray	2017
Hardin Northern	Polar Bears	Dola	58	7:26	Black, White	2014
North Baltimore	Tigers	North Baltimore	64	7:26	Orange, Black	2023
Lima Perry	Commodores	Lima	118	7:26	Red, White	2004
Ridgedale	Rockets	Morral	80	7:27	Columbia Blue, Red	2021
Ridgemont	Golden Gophers	Mount Victory	75	7:28	Green, Gold	2001
Temple Christian	Pioneers	Lima	N/A	N/A	Navy Blue, Silver	2001 (No Football)
Upper Scioto Valley	Rams	McGuffey	81	7:26	Red, Black, White	2007
Waynesfield-Goshen	Tigers	Waynesfield	59	7:26	Blue, Gold	2001

=== Recent history ===
- Troy Christian was set to become a football-only member in the NWCC for 2012, but decided in July 2012 to cancel its football season due to low numbers. They were hoping to play a full NWCC schedule by 2014, but ultimately withdrew from the league. Troy Christian previously had competed as a football-only member in the NWCC until after the 2004 season.
- An invitation to join was extended to Hardin Northern, a school that struggled to field a varsity football team for 2013 season. On February 19, 2014, Hardin Northern's school board voted 5–0 to withdraw from the Blanchard Valley Conference and apply to the NWCC for membership. The NWCC accepted Hardin Northern as a full member for 2014–15 on March 19, 2014, with football joining in 2015–16.
- On April 10, 2015, The Cross County Conference announced that they added Fort Loramie as a football-only member starting in 2017. 2016 will be their last season competing in the NWCC.
- In December 2015, the NWCC announced that Elgin would become a full member of the league beginning in the 2017–18 school year. Elgin will be coming over from the Mid-Ohio Athletic Conference Blue Division, which is losing seven of its members to a new league in the near future.
- In April 2019, Riverside and Lehman Catholic announced they were leaving to join Covington, Bethel, Miami East, Milton-Union, Northridge and Troy Christian in the formation of a new conference
- In October 2019, Ridgedale's school board voted 3–2 to leave the Northern 10 Athletic Conference and join the NWCC beginning with the 2021–2022 school year.
- In January 2020, Crestline announced they would become a football-only member in 2021.
- At a board meeting on March 18, 2021, Cory–Rawson voted to leave the Blanchard Valley Conference for the NWCC in 2023.
- On November 2, 2021, North Baltimore announced they would be joining the NWCC fully for the 2023–24 school year.
- Crestline left the NWCC to become a football independent after the 2023 season

== Former members ==
School	Nickname	Location	Colors	Tenure	Notes
Crestline	Bulldogs	Crestline	Blue, White	2021-2023	Football only. Became Independent in football
Fairbanks	Panthers	Milford Center	Red, White	2004-2012	Moved to the MOAC then moved to the Ohio Heritage Conference
Fort Loramie	Redskins	Fort Loramie	Red, Black	2011-2017	Football only. Joined Cross County Conference (also for football only)
Lehman Catholic	Cavaliers	Sidney	Blue, Gold	2011-2021	
Marion Catholic	Fighting Irish	Marion	Green, White	2001-2013	School closed after the 2012–13 school year
Riverside	Pirates	DeGraff	Red, Royal Blue	2001-2021	
St. Wendelin	Mohawks	Fostoria	Black, Gold	2009-2010	Football only. Was voted out of the NWCC in 2010 after canceling three of their league games during the 2010 season. School closed after 2016–17 school year.
Troy Christian	Eagles	Troy	Forest Green, Gold	2001-2004	Football only
Yellow Springs	Bulldogs	Yellow Springs	Blue, White	2003-2008	Football only. Dropped football, then joined the Metro Buckeye Conference

== Football championships ==
=== By year ===
Year	Champions
2001	Troy Christian
2002	Troy Christian
2003	Riverside
2004	Marion Catholic
2005	Waynesfield-Goshen
2006	Fairbanks; Riverside; Waynesfield-Goshen
2007	Fairbanks
2008	Fairbanks
2009	Waynesfield-Goshen
2010	Fairbanks
2011	Waynesfield-Goshen
2012	Fort Loramie; Fairbanks
2013	Lehman Catholic
2014	Lehman Catholic
2015	Riverside; Fort Loramie
2016	Upper Scioto Valley; Lehman Catholic
2017	Lehman Catholic
2018	Lehman Catholic
2019	Lima Perry
2020	Lima Perry (Lane Division); Waynesfield-Goshen (Dennis Division)
2021	Upper Scioto Valley
2022	Waynesfield-Goshen
2023	Waynesfield-Goshen
