= Ohio State Route 196 =

State highway in western Ohio, US

State Route 196

Route information
- Maintained by ODOT
- Length: 10.21 mi (16.43 km)
- Existed: 1923–present

Major junctions
- South end: US 33 / SR 385 in New Hampshire
- SR 67 in Waynesfield
- North end: SR 117 near Harrod

Location
- Country: United States
- State: Ohio
- Counties: Auglaize, Allen

Highway system
- Ohio State Highway System; Interstate; US; State; Scenic
← SR 195	→ SR 197

State Route 196 (SR 196) is a 10.21-mile (16.43 km) long north–south state highway in the western portion of the U.S. state of Ohio. The southern terminus of SR 196 is at a signalized intersection nearly 3.50 miles (5.63 km) southeast of Waynesfield that marks its junction with U.S. Route 33 (US 33) and SR 385, which has its western terminus at the same location. The northern terminus of SR 196 is at a T-intersection with SR 117 about 4.25 miles (6.84 km) southwest of Harrod.

== Route description ==
Along its way, SR 196 travels through the eastern part of Auglaize County and the southeastern portion of Allen County. There is no portion of SR 196 that is included within the National Highway System (NHS). The NHS is a system of routes deemed to be most important for the economy, mobility and defense of the country.

== History ==
The debut of SR 196 took place in 1923. Since its inception, the highway has maintained the same routing through eastern Auglaize and southeastern Allen Counties.

== Major intersections ==
County	Location	mi	km	Destinations	Notes
Auglaize	Goshen Township	0.00	0.00	US 33 / SR 385 east (Market Street)	Western terminus of SR 385
Auglaize	Wayne Township	3.19	5.13	SR 67 east – Kenton	Southern end of SR 67 concurrency
Auglaize	Waynesfield	4.15	6.68	SR 67 west (West Wapakoneta Street) / South Westminster Street	Northern end of SR 67 concurrency
Allen	Auglaize Township	10.21	16.43	SR 117 (Bellefontaine Road) – Lima	
1.000 mi = 1.609 km; 1.000 km = 0.621 mi: Concurrency terminus
