= Waynesfield-Goshen High School =

Location
- 500 North Westminster Street; Waynesfield, (Auglaize County), Ohio 45896; United States
- Coordinates: 40°36′18″N 83°58′27″W

Information
- Type: Public, Coeducational high school
- Motto: Pride In The Past...Achieving In The Present...Planning For The Future
- Superintendent: Tim Pence
- Principal: Joshua Spencer
- Teaching staff: 16.28 (FTE)
- Grades: PK-12
- Student to teacher ratio: 14.62
- Colors: Blue and Gold
- Athletics conference: Northwest Central Conference
- Mascot: Tiger
- Nickname: W-G
- Team name: Tigers
- Accreditation: North Central Association of Colleges and Schools
- Website: https://www.wgschools.org/

Waynesfield-Goshen Local Schools is the only public high school that is located in Waynesfield, Ohio. Waynesfield, Ohio Located in northwestern Ohio of Auglaize County, Ohio.Their nickname is the tigers and their colors are blue and gold. They are a member of the Northwest Central Conference. Waynesfield-Goshen Local Schools, has a strong tradition of academic, athletic, artistic and music success. The school district serves students from the Villages of Waynesfield and New Hampshire, as well as parts of Wayne and Goshen Townships, and parts of Union and Clay Townships.

== Academics ==
Waynesfield-Goshen Local Schools is a fully accredited high school, meeting all secondary school requirements of both the state of Ohio and North Central Educational Association. Waynesfield-Goshen faculty have been noted for their excellence in the classroom. In 2012, the Gilder Lehrman Institute of American History selected Joe Foster as the History Teacher of the Year for the state of Ohio. Foster was again honored in 2014, this time as National Teacher of the Year by the Civil War Trust. Math teacher Kathy Lament was recognized as the 2017 Teacher of the Year for State Board of Education District 1.

== Performing arts ==
Waynesfield-Goshen is also home to:

- Marching Band
- Concert Band
- Concert Choir
- Musical/Theater

== Athletics ==
Waynesfield-Goshen Local Schools competes in the Northwest Central Conference in Ohio.

=== Sports Offered ===
Fall Sports
- Boys Cross Country (Division 3)
- Girls Cross Country (Division 3)
- Boys Golf (Division 3)
- Girls Golf (Division 2)
- Boys Football (Division 7)
- Girls Volleyball (Division 4)
- Cheerleading
Winter Sports
- Boys Basketball (Division 4)
- Girls Basketball (Division 4)
- Boys Indoor Track & Field (Division 1)
- Girls Indoor Track & Field (Division 1)
- Boys Bowling (Division 2)
- Girls Bowling (Division 2)
- Cheerleading
Spring Sports
- Boys Baseball (Division 4)
- Girls Softball (Division 4)
- Boys Track & Field (Division 3)
- Girls Track & Field (Division 2)

== Ohio High School Athletic Association State Championships ==
- Boys Track and Field – 2006

== OHSAA State Runner-Up ==
- Girls Track and Field -2012 Further Information: Ohio High School Athletic Association

== Football State Playoff Appearances ==
- Division 7 (2023, 2022, 2021 & 2020)
- Division 6 (2012, 2009, 2007 & 2005)
- Division 5 (1989)

== OHSAA State Champions ==
- 2012 Girls 100 meter hurdles State Champion – Ivy Horn
- 2011 Girls 400 meter relay State Champions- Abbey Gray, Morgan Horn, Frankie James, Ivy Horn
- 2008 Boys Long Jump State Champion – Gray Horn
- 2006 Boys 800 meter relay State Champions – Joe Neal Horn, Gray Horn, Kellen Fetter, Jesse Norris
- 2006 Boys 100 meter dash State Champion – Joe Neal Horn
- 2006 Boys 200 meter dash State Champion – Joe Neal Horn
- 2006 Boys 400 meter dash State Champion – Joe Neal Horn
- 2006 Boys Pole Vault State Champion – Gray Horn
- 2001 Boys 300 hurdles (39″) State Champion – Doug Endel
- 1929 Boys Discus State Champion – Joe Ashley Horn

== Ohio High School Athletic Association State Runner-Up ==
- Girls Track & field - 2012

Further Information: Ohio High School Athletic Association

== OHSAA State Runner-Up ==
- 2012 Girls Long Jump State Runner-Up – Ivy Horn
- 2011 Girls 100 Meter Dash State Runner-Up – Ivy Horn
- 2007 Boys High Jump State Runner-Up – Gray Horn
- 2007 Boys Pole Vault State Runner-Up – Gray Horn
- 2007 Boys 110 meter hurdles State Runner-Up – Gray Horn
- 2002 Girls 300 Meter Low Hurdles State Runner-Up – Jenny Endel
- 1984 Boys 110 meter hurdles State Runner-Up – Todd Miller

=== Waynesfield-Goshen NWCC Championships ===
- Baseball (0): None
- Boys Basketball (3): 2005, 2003 & 2002
- Girls Basketball: (5): 2014, 2013, 2007, 2003 & 2002
- Boys Cross Country (1): 2019
- Girls Cross Country (4): 2022, 2021,2020 & 2019
- Football (6): 2023, 2022, 2011, 2009, 2006 & 2005
- Boys Golf (2): 2019 & 2010
- Girls Golf (0): None
- Softball: (0): None
- Boys Track & Field (15): 2018, 2017, 2016, 2015, 2014, 2013, 2010, 2009, 2008, 2007, 2006, 2005, 2004, 2003 & 2002
- Girls Track Field (13): 2023, 2022, 2017, 2015, 2014, 2012, 2011, 2010, 2009, 2006, 2005, 2004 & 2002

== Notable alumni ==
- Bob Ewing was a Major League Baseball Pitcher. He played in the majors from 1902 to 1912 Cincinnati Reds, Philadelphia Phillies, and St. Louis Cardinals.
- Gray Horn heptathlon champion at 2014 USA Indoor Track and Field Championships and Bronze Medalist at the 2012 US Olympic Trials.
- Joe Neal Horn was a former National Football League Wide receiver for the Indianapolis Colts. Signed as a Free Agent. He also spent time in the Canadian Football League for the Calgary Stampeders and the Arena Football League for the Cleveland Gladiators and Tampa Bay Storm.
