= Ohio State Route 195 =

State highway in Hardin County, Ohio, US

State Route 195

Route information
- Maintained by ODOT
- Length: 3.588 mi (5.774 km)
- Existed: 1923–present

Major junctions
- South end: CR 110 / CR 65 near McGuffey
- North end: SR 309 / CR 65 near McGuffey

Location
- Country: United States
- State: Ohio
- Counties: Hardin

Highway system
- Ohio State Highway System; Interstate; US; State; Scenic
← SR 194	→ SR 196

State Route 195 (SR 195) is a 3.6-mile-long (5.8 km) north–south state highway in the western portion of the U.S. state of Ohio. SR 195 has its southern terminus at an intersection with Hardin County Route 110 one mile (1.6 km) south of the village of McGuffey. Its northern terminus is at its junction with SR 309 about two miles (3.2 km) north of McGuffey. It is entirely located within western Hardin County.

SR 195 was created in the middle of the 1920s. Much of this two-lane highway outside of McGuffey travels amidst mostly open countryside. Before the 2010s, SR 195 continued south along the banks of the Scioto River to SR 235 in Roundhead Township. A majority of the portion of former SR 195 south of McGuffey traveled along the western banks of the Scioto River in one of its northernmost and narrowest stretches. Much of this portion is now completely abandoned (closed to traffic).

== Route description ==
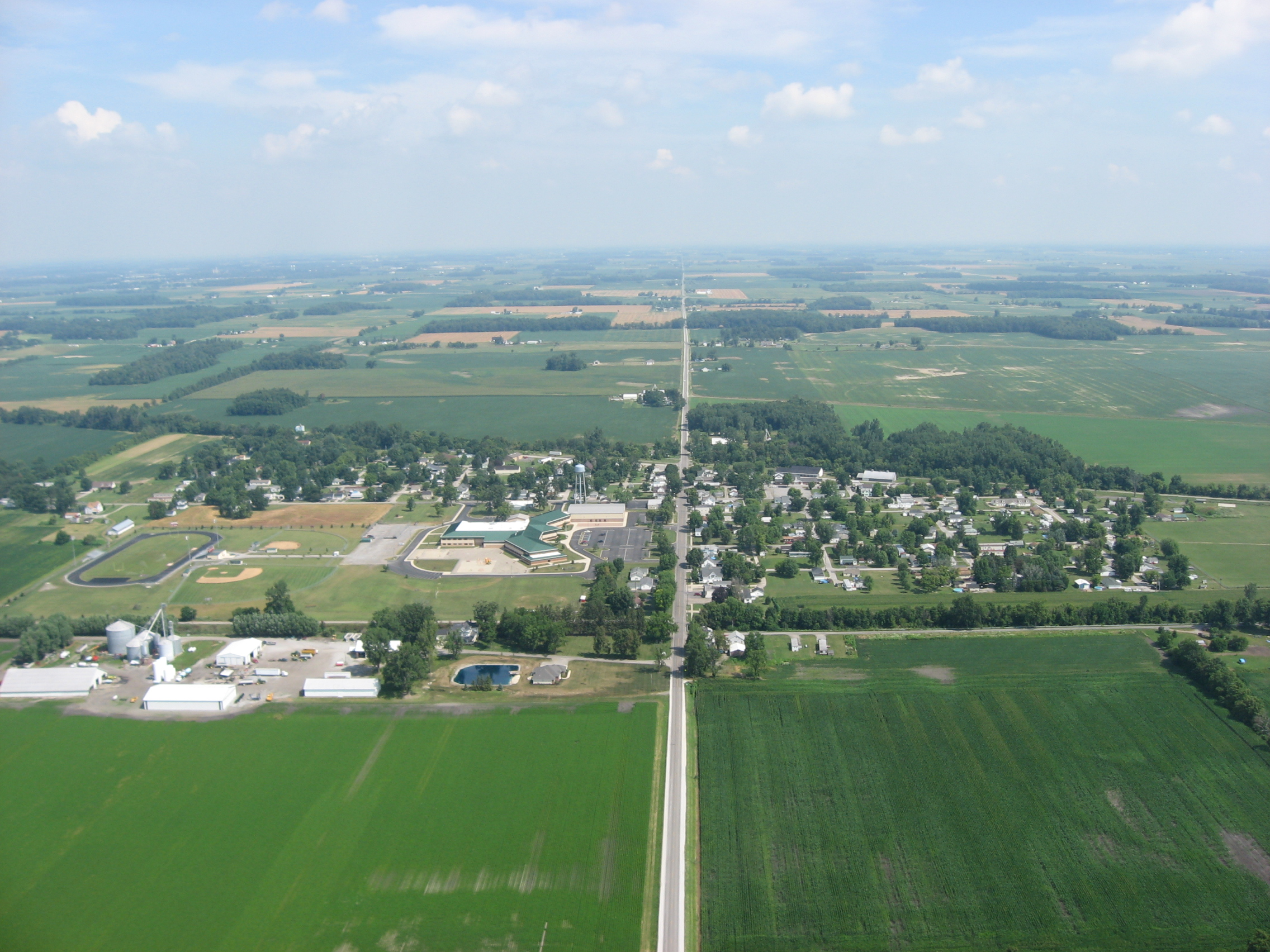
Aerial view of SR 195 crossing through McGuffey

The route begins at a four-way intersection in Marion Township where Hardin County Route 110 travels east and west and CR 65 heads south. SR 195 heads due north and enters McGuffey just prior to its intersection with Cottonwood Road. As it passes through the village along Courtright Street, the highway passes amidst both homes and commercial businesses, as well as Upper Scioto Valley High School. Prior to departing McGuffey, SR 195 crosses a former railroad grade, and is abutted on the east side by some woods. As it re-enters Marion Township, the route enters back into open farm country, with a couple of homes appearing along the way. SR 195 crosses CR 90, and continues north past a small patch of woods amidst a few homes on the east side just prior to meeting TR 84. After intersecting CR 80, the route goes by a few more homes amidst the open fields prior to arriving at its endpoint at SR 309. Continuing north after SR 195 terminates is CR 65, which goes on to intersect SR 701 less than 0.50 miles (0.80 km) to the north.

This state highway is not included as a part of the National Highway System (NHS). The NHS is a network of routes that are identified as being most important for the economy, mobility and defense of the country.

== History ==
SR 195 was designated in 1923. The original route was 9.42 miles (15.16 km) long and traveled from SR 235 (SR 69 prior to 1968) in Roundhead Township and traveled east and northeast through portions of Roundhead, McDonald, and Marion townships before transitioning to its present routing through McGuffey and ending at SR 309 (formerly SR 10 and U.S. Route 30S). The route had utilized this alignment through western Hardin County throughout most of its lifetime. Beginning in 1995, the portion of SR 195 along the Scioto River between CR 150 and CR 110 began sliding into the river. Between 1995 and 2010, this stretch of road would be closed six times with repairs totaling US$1,000,000. Ohio Department of Transportation (ODOT) officials determined that the peaty soil of the Scioto Marsh and the construction of this section of the road to lower specifications caused the road to slip into the river. In 2014, ODOT truncated SR 195's southern terminus to the intersection with CR 110 with the drivable portions of the former state highway becoming county and township-maintained roads.

== Major intersections ==
The entire route is in Hardin County.

Location	mi	km	Destinations	Notes
Marion Township	0.000	0.000	CR 110 / CR 65	
Marion Township	3.588	5.774	SR 309 (Harding Highway) / CR 65 – Lima	
1.000 mi = 1.609 km; 1.000 km = 0.621 mi
