= Ohio State Route 385 =

State highway in western Ohio, US

State Route 385

Route information
- Maintained by ODOT
- Length: 6.28 mi (10.11 km)
- Existed: 1935–present

Major junctions
- West end: US 33 / SR 196 in New Hampshire
- East end: SR 117 in Roundhead

Location
- Country: United States
- State: Ohio
- Counties: Auglaize, Hardin

Highway system
- Ohio State Highway System; Interstate; US; State; Scenic
| ← SR 384 | → SR 386 |

State Route 385 (SR 385) is an east–west state highway in western Ohio. The western terminus of State Route 385 is at U.S. Route 33 in New Hampshire, at a signalized intersection that doubles as the southern terminus of State Route 196. State Route 385's eastern terminus is at State Route 117 in the unincorporated community of Roundhead, less than two blocks northwest of State Route 117's junction with State Route 235.

== Route description ==
State Route 385 passes through Auglaize and Hardin Counties. No portion of this highway is included as a part of the National Highway System.

=== Auglaize County ===
State Route 385 begins at a signalized intersection with U.S. Route 33 in the hamlet of New Hampshire that also serves as the southern terminus of State Route 196. Heading easterly along Market Street, State Route 385 passes through a residential area for approximately two blocks before entering into rural Goshen Township. The vast majority of State Route 385 passes through open farmland, with homes appearing every so often on both sides of the roadway. After passing Campbell Road, State Route 385 bends to the southeast as it intersects Buffenbarger Road at the Walnut Hill Cemetery. Turning back to the east, the state highway passes Feikert Road prior to crossing into Hardin County.

=== Hardin County ===
Now traveling through Roundhead Township, State Route 385 bends to the east-northeast, and passes Township Road 15 before curving back to the east. After successive intersections with Dog Leg Road and Arbogast Road, the state route ultimately bends back to the east-northeast, and makes its way into the unincorporated community of Roundhead. The highway passes a few homes prior to arriving at its endpoint at State Route 117, just two blocks northwest of its junction with State Route 235.

== History ==
Established in 1935 along the routing that it currently occupies, State Route 385 has not seen any significant changes to its routing through its history. The only thing that has changed is the route at its western terminus. Prior to the designation of U.S. Route 33, the highway meeting State Route 385 and State Route 196 in New Hampshire was designated as State Route 32.

== Major intersections ==
| County | Location | mi | km | Destinations | Notes |
|---|---|---|---|---|---|
| Auglaize | Goshen Township | 0.00 | 0.00 | US 33 / SR 196 north (Market Street / Main Street) | Southern terminus of SR 196 |
| Hardin | Roundhead Township | 6.28 | 10.11 | SR 117 (Main Street) | |
1.000 mi = 1.609 km; 1.000 km = 0.621 mi
