= J.H. Manchester Round Barn =

Largest round barn east of the Mississippi River

- Round Barn
- U.S. National Register of Historic Places
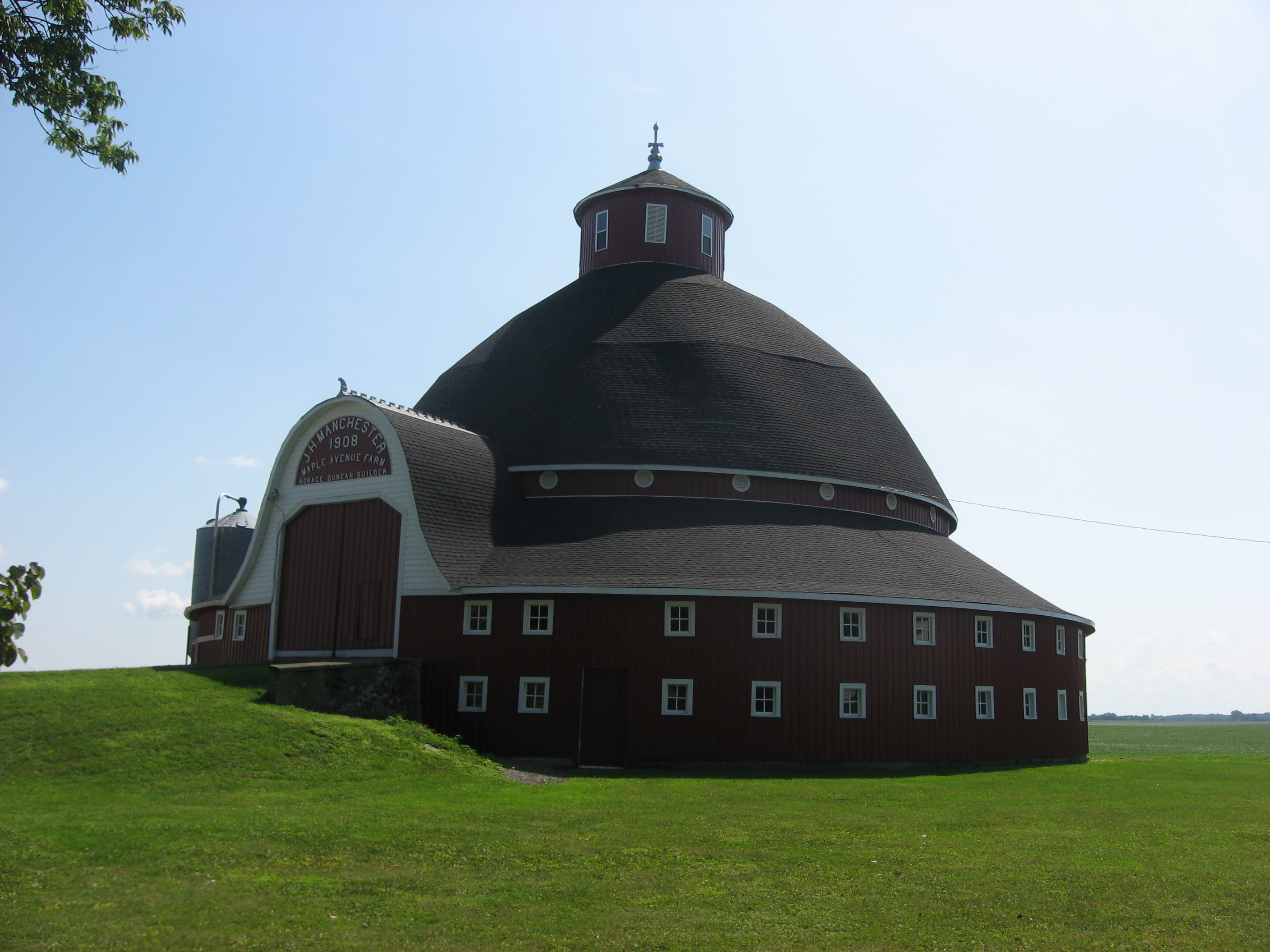

- Location within Ohio Location within the United States
- Nearest city: New Hampshire, Ohio
- Coordinates: 40°33′31.6″N 83°53′29.7″W
- Area: 48 acres (19 ha)
- Built: 1908
- Built by: Horace Duncan
- Architectural style: Round Barn, Italianate
- MPS: Round Barns in the Black Swamp of Northwest Ohio TR
- NRHP reference No.: 80002942
- Added to NRHP: April 17, 1980

The J.H. Manchester Round Barn, on Ohio State Route 385 between Roundhead, Ohio and New Hampshire, Ohio, United States, is a round barn that was built in 1908 by Horace Duncan for farmer Jason H. Manchester.

== Architecture ==
The barn is the largest round barn east of the Mississippi River at 102 feet in diameter. It has two tiers with the second tier 70 feet in diameter and a total of 88 feet in height with a domed gambled shingled roof. The entrance faces west and features double-hinged doors with diagonal siding swing with a helmet-shaped projecting entrance with the nameplate "J.H. MANCHESTER, 1908, MAPLE AVENUE FARM, HORACE DUNCAN BUILDER". The interior echos Shaker design with hay and feed were stored in the center for livestock housed around the circumference.

The barn was listed on the National Register of Historic Places in 1980 under simple name Round Barn and included 48 acres (19 ha) and three contributing buildings: the main house and two smaller frame houses.

== History ==
The property was listed along with six other round barns in the area noted as the only known round barns of this size and stature in this part of Ohio. Lumber was being harvested from the Great Black Swamp and shipped via the railway after the 1880s-1890s burst of barrel and stave manufacturing. Agricultural experimentation was happening at the turn of the century as a result of the new wealth from manufacturing, prompting the University of Illinois to develop and encourage round barns as being more efficient way to tend animals and store harvest and supplies. This, in turn, helped round barn builders gain credibility for their design and new barns being built.

Jason Manchester migrated at age 12 with his family from Vermont in 1865 with his parents, taking over of 500 acres of unfarmed land. His father improved the land and was owner of 1,000 acres at the time of his death. Jason attended schools in Union County and Vermont and took formal ownership of the farm after his father's death. He aspired to be recognized as a model farm in the Midwest, developing the estate with improvement programs that produced impressive yields and encouraged new technology and engineering, such as the round barn and modern harvesters.

The Manchester family is still in current ownership of the property.
