= Upper Scioto Valley High School =

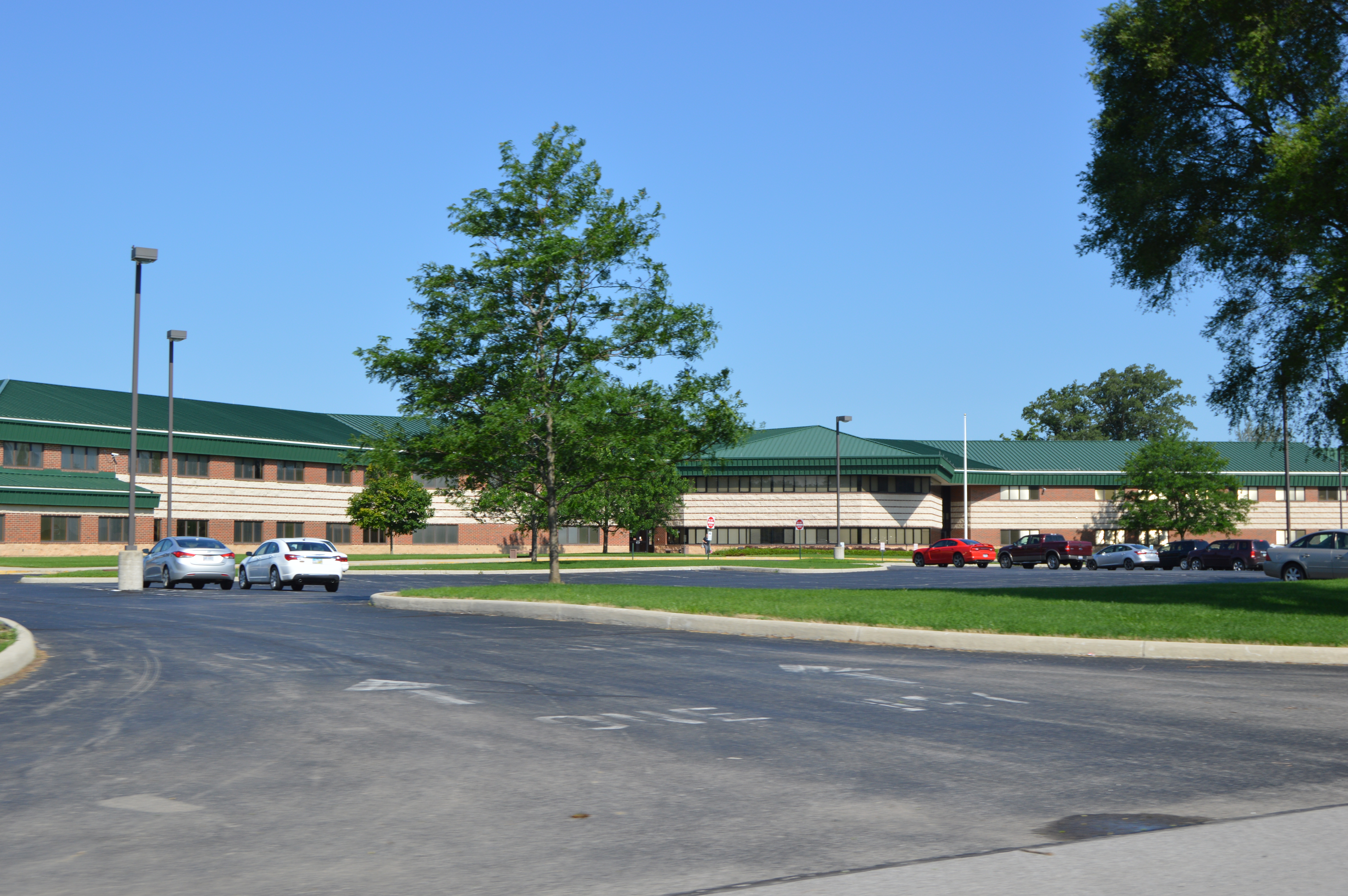
- Front of the school

Location
- 510 South Courtright Street; McGuffey, Ohio 45859; United States; 40°41′30″N 83°47′13″W

Information
- Type: Public, Coeducational high school
- School district: Upper Scioto Valley Local School District
- Superintendent: Craig Hurley
- Grades: K-12
- Enrollment: 150 (2023–2024)
- Colors: Red, Black and White
- Athletics conference: Northwest Central Conference
- Mascot: Ram
- Team name: Rams
- Website: www.usv.k12.oh.us

Upper Scioto Valley High School is a school in McGuffey, Ohio in the United States. It is part of the Upper Scioto Valley Local School District.

The district serves students from the villages of Alger, McGuffey and Roundhead, as well as Roundhead Township, Marion Township, McDonald Township and parts of other townships in southwest Hardin County, Ohio.

The school came about in 1965 as a result of a consolidation of Roundhead, Alger and McGuffey-McDonald schools. The school originally planned to call itself Scioto Valley, but that name was already in use by a school in Pike County. As the school is located near the headwaters of the Scioto River, the name Upper Scioto Valley was adopted.

The nickname, Rams, comes from the initials of the three schools which consolidated (Roundhead, Alger, McGuffey-McDonald) to form Upper Scioto Valley. The school's colors - red, black and white - were also taken, one each, from the schools from which USV was formed. The Alger Eagles wore red and gray, McGuffey Rockets wore garnet and black, and Roundhead Indians wore blue and white.

Upper Scioto Valley HS holds the distinction as the first high school in Ohio to win boys' and girls' state basketball championships in the same season. The teams accomplished this feat in 1994. Delphos St. John's (in 2002) and Maria Stein Marion Local (in 2003) are the only two other schools in Ohio to accomplish this.

Upper Scioto Valley's Fight Song is sung to the tune "Anchors Aweigh."

== Ohio High School Athletic Association State Championships ==
- Boys basketball – 1994
- Girls basketball – 1993, 1994
