= Holden, Ohio =

Unincorporated community in Ohio, U.S.

Coordinates: 40°36′09″N 83°52′49″W

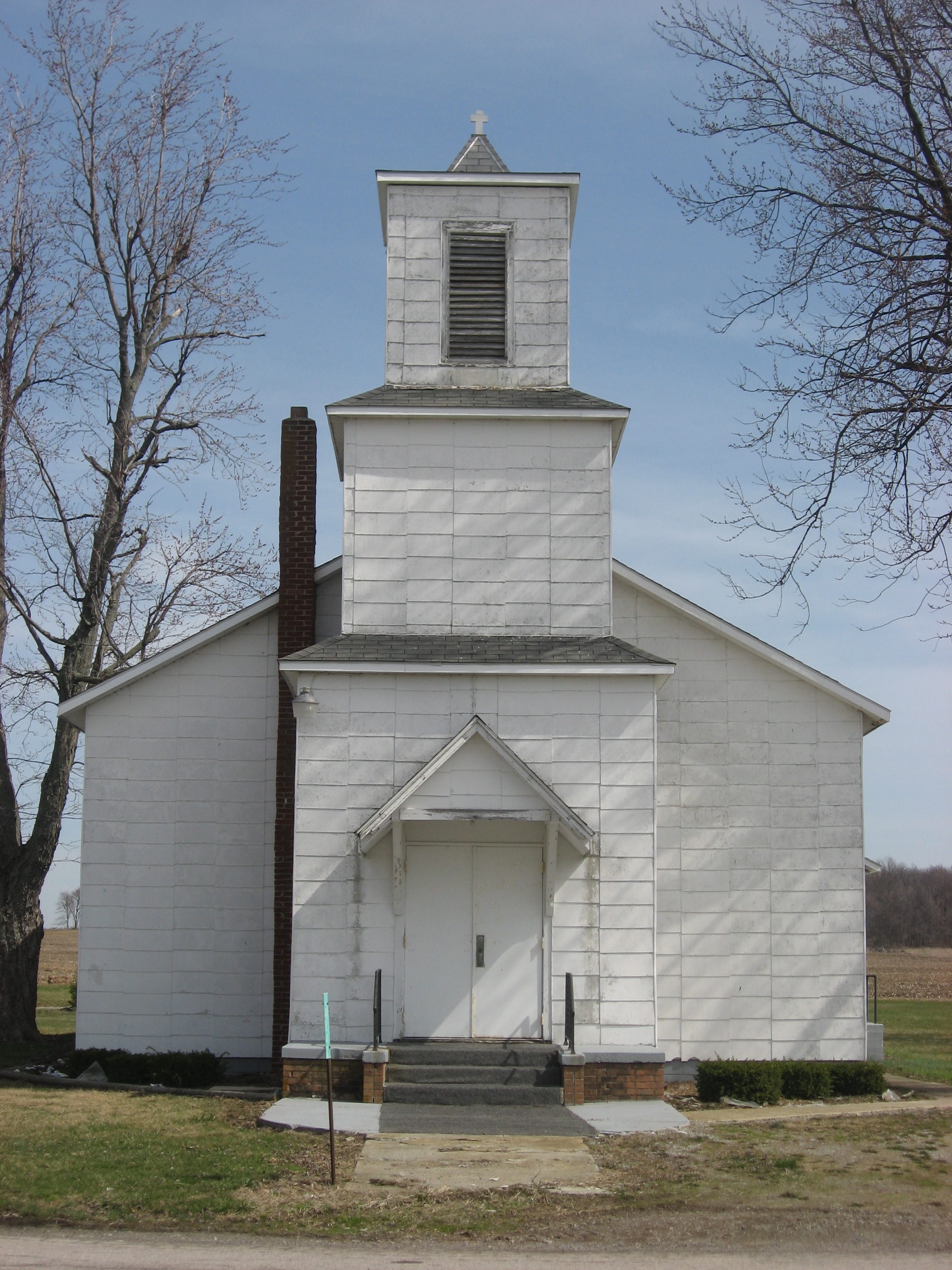
Former Methodist church

Holden is an unincorporated community on the border of Wayne Township in Auglaize County and Roundhead Township in Hardin County, in the U.S. state of Ohio.

== History ==
A post office called Holden was established in 1899, and remained in operation until 1906. The community once had a sawmill.
