= New Hampshire (disambiguation) =

New Hampshire is a state in the United States of America.

New Hampshire may also refer to:

- Province of New Hampshire, the colonial-era predecessor of the U.S. state
- New Hampshire, Ohio, an unincorporated community in Auglaize County
- New Hampshire (collection), a collection of poetry by Robert Frost
- New Hampshire (chicken), a breed of chicken
- USS New Hampshire (1864), a storeship
- USS New Hampshire (BB-25), a Connecticut-class battleship commissioned in 1908
- USS New Hampshire (BB-70), a Montana-class battleship authorized in 1940 but canceled in 1943
- USS New Hampshire (SSN-778), a Virginia-class submarine commissioned in 2008
- University of New Hampshire
  - New Hampshire Wildcats, the athletic teams of the University of New Hampshire
- New Hampshire Avenue, a street in Washington, DC
- "New Hampshire", a song by John Linnell from the album State Songs, 1999
