= Gray Horn =

American track and field athlete

Gray Horn (February 18, 1990) is an American athlete who competes in the decathlon and heptathlon events.

== Amateur career ==
Horn attended Waynesfield-Goshen High School where he won three state titles and led his team to the 2006 OHSAA state track title. He was also all-state in football.

At the University of Florida Horn was a multiple-time Southeastern Conference champion.

== International career ==
In 2012 Horn was the bronze medalist at the 2012 US Olympic trials in the decathlon, but did not have the "A" standard so did not compete at the 2012 Olympics.

In 2014 Horn won the heptathlon title at the 2014 USA Indoor Track and Field Championships.
