= Louise Clapp =

American baseball player

- Pitcher
- Born: May 12, 1934; Harrod, Ohio, U.S.
- Died: October 17, 1967 (aged 33); Cleveland, Ohio, U.S.
- Batted: Right Threw: Right

Teams
- Fort Wayne Daisies (1954); South Bend Blue Sox (1954)

Career highlights and awards
- Women in Baseball – AAGPBL Permanent Display at Baseball Hall of Fame and Museum (1988)

Louise Lucelia Clapp (May 12, 1934 – October 17, 1967) was a pitcher who played in the All-American Girls Professional Baseball League (AAGPBL). She batted and threw right-handed.

Little is known about this player who saw action in the All-American Girls Professional Baseball League during the 1954 season.

Clapp split the year between the Fort Wayne Daisies and South Bend Blue Sox teams. She hurled five innings of ball in three pitching appearances.

The league folded at the end of the season. Clapp was not located after that.

She is part of Women in Baseball, a permanent display based at the Baseball Hall of Fame and Museum in Cooperstown, New York, which was unveiled in 1988 to honor the entire All-American Girls Professional Baseball League.
