= Bob Ewing =

American baseball player (1873–1947)

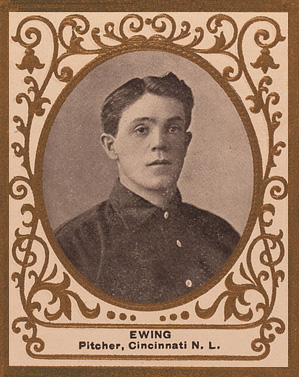
- Pitcher / Outfielder
- Born: April 24, 1873; New Hampshire, Ohio, U.S.
- Died: June 20, 1947 (aged 74); Wapakoneta, Ohio, U.S.
- Batted: Right Threw: Right

MLB debut
- April 19, 1902, for the Cincinnati Reds

Last MLB appearance
- May 13, 1912, for the St. Louis Cardinals

MLB statistics
- Win–loss record: 124–118
- Earned run average: 2.49
- Strikeouts: 998
- Stats at Baseball Reference

Teams
- Cincinnati Reds (1902–1909); Philadelphia Phillies (1910–1911); St. Louis Cardinals (1912)

Career highlights and awards
- Cincinnati Reds Hall of Fame

George Lemuel Ewing (April 24, 1873 – June 20, 1947) was an American Major League Baseball pitcher. He played in the majors from 1902 to 1912 for the Cincinnati Reds, Philadelphia Phillies, and St. Louis Cardinals.

== Early life ==
Ewing was born on April 24, 1873, in New Hampshire, Ohio. He grew up on a farm in Auglaize County where as a young boy, he pitched potatoes against a target on a barn. The nickname Long Bob came about due to him being 6 ft 6 in (1.98 m). Later he would be given the moniker of 'Old Wapak', in reference to the town he called home.

Bob started his baseball career at a relatively late age, 24, before signing his first contract. Long Bob played his first game away from New Hampshire in 1895 at the Wapakoneta fairgrounds. He then played for Wapakoneta from 1896 to 1897.

Ewing's first semi-pro experience was in August 1897, when he joined the Toledo Mud Hens team in the Interstate League. His professional debut with a 9–4 victory over Springfield, Ohio. He was consistently the best pitcher in the league, going 21–9 and 25–13 in consecutive seasons. Over the next three seasons, Ewing pitched nearly 900 innings and won more than 20 games annually for Toledo.

In 1901, he next went to the Kansas City Blues in the Western League where he went 21–5 and led the Western League in winning percentage. With Ewing, the Blues won the pennant by 10 games. Ewing later recalled that Kansas City was "...the only pennant winning team I ever played on."

== Baseball career ==
=== The Cincinnati Reds ===
While at home from Kansas City, Bob played ball with a local club in Sidney, Ohio. On October 10, 1901, the Cincinnati Reds arrived in Sidney after going through local Ohio teams looking to find some competition with the Sidney semi-pro team. As the Reds warmed up, they could not have anticipated what they were about to see. The visitors were up to bat first. On the mound stood all 6-feet-6-inches of Long Bob Ewing. Ewing dueled Schwab, his Reds counterpart, to a 3–3 tie when the game was called because of darkness after eight innings. Ewing struck out many more batters than Schwab. Within two weeks he was under contract to the Cincinnati Reds.

Long Bob Ewing made his major league game debut on April 19, 1902. He walked ten batters, seven of them in one inning, in a 9–5 loss to Chicago. It was nearly a month before he gained his first victory; then he missed the second half of the season with a sore arm.

Bob fought for a place on the roster the next two seasons before establishing himself as one of the Reds' top pitchers. Ewing finished with a 6 and 6 won-lost record. He pitched ten complete games in 12 starts and compiled a fine 2.98 earned run average. A sore arm limited his playing time toward the end of the season.

In 1903, Long Bob developed into the workhorse of the staff. Completing 27 of the 28 games he started, Ewing posted 14 wins and lowered his ERA to 2.73. He delivered at the plate as well. That season, Ewing hit .253.

The season's highlight came on August 18, 1903. The headline in the "Cincinnati Post" told the story: "Kelley Claims Ewing Pitched a No-Hitter" He blanked the New York Giants 7-0, giving up one infield hit by Jack Dunn in the eighth inning. The official scorer recorded the play as an out, but was ordered to score it as a hit. A dispatch from New York after the game stated: "Long Bob Ewing, fed on raw meat and clams for a week, was taken out of his cage and sent against the Giants...Old Wapak fired the leather down the alley so fast that the haze in its wake looked like the smoke in a shooting gallery." A seasoned and confident Bob Ewing barnstormed with the Reds after the season concluded.

On September 30, 1903, the Cincinnati Reds came to Sidney for a rematch. Long Bob was on the mound for Reds, which had just pummeled Lima 9-1 the day before. After the game, the "Journal's" editor, William Binkley, wryly observed that the Reds came to town to show "...what a difference there is between a professional team and pumpkin puller aggregations in smaller towns...and to prick what bubbles of vanity they entertain." After Long Bob took his seat at the end of the first inning, Sidney led 5-1. Binkley chortled: "The Reds were amazed, and in a figurative sense, more blue than red."

The Reds outfielders were "as busy as a cow's tail in fly time", according to Binkley, while Sidney's infielders "guarded the infield like watch dogs fed on electricity." In the end, Long Bob and the Reds absorbed a 14-2 beating. Mr. Binkley appropriately summed up the event: "In short, the Reds were outclassed, the spectators were given a treat of rare sport, and the visitors gracefully acknowledged the corn."

The Cincinnati Reds returned to Sidney the next year for what the Wapakoneta newspaper described as "Ewing Day in Sidney." Fifty wagons circled the court square, and banners proclaiming 'Ewing Day' were hung everywhere. A local baker sold 'Ewing pies' and bartenders served 'Ewing highballs.' Two thousand fans jammed the ball field. As the first Sidney batter whiffed, the crowd screamed: "Don't throw so hard, you'll kill the catcher!" Ewing and the Reds prevailed, 6-1.

In professional baseball after the turn of the century, the spitball was a legal pitch and Ewing was known as having one of the best in the majors. By late 1904 Ewing became one of the National League's first notable exponents of the wet one. A newspaper writer of the era described him as also having "great speed and a puzzling drop curve." With that new weapon he enjoyed his best year in 1905, securing his 20th victory in the last game of the season. Long Bob won 20 games in 34 starts with only 11 losses during the 1905 season. He still batted over .250.

On September 11, 1906, Ewing dueled Deacon Phillippe and Vic Willis to a scoreless tie in Pittsburgh, scattering eight hits over 15 innings. He ended 1906 with an ERA of 2.38 and almost 300 innings pitched.

The highlight of the 1907 season came early when he was handed the ball for opening day on April 11, 1907. The opponent was the Pittsburgh Pirates, led by the immortal future hall-of-famer Honus Wagner. Ewing pitched a complete game, four hit, 4-3 victory. In what he always viewed as the highlight of his career, Ewing fanned the first six Pirate batters he faced, including such outstanding hitters as Wagner, Fred Clarke and Ginger Beaumont. The Cincinnati Enquirer reported that "He used the spitball when he found himself in a tight place and it was very effective in his hands." The Reds come from behind with two runs in the ninth inning.

Long Bob did his best to ensure his own success in 1907. Pitching over 330 innings, he compiled a career-best ERA of 1.73 and averaged almost twice as many strikeouts as bases on balls. Although he won 17 games, little offensive help from his teammates resulted in 19 losses. Ewing accomplished all this at the age of 34 that year.

Bob Ewing concluded his career with the Reds after the 1909 season. In his eight-year stint with the Cincinnati club, he compiled an overall earned run average of 2.37. His ERA currently stands as the best Reds' career ERA record ever compiled.

=== Philadelphia ===
On January 20, 1910, the Reds traded Ewing to the Philadelphia Phillies in a two-for-two swap of pitchers-Ewing and Ad Brennan for Harry Coveleski and Frank Corridon. In Philadelphia, Long Bob was an afterthought in manager Red Dooin's plans. But when other pitchers faltered, Ewing stepped up. The oldest regular starting pitcher in the league, he went 16–14 for a fourth-place team which led the Phillies in complete games and pitching three games in which he allowed three hits or fewer. Philadelphia dropped him in September 1911.

=== St. Louis & Minneapolis ===
Roger Bresnahan gave Ewing a brief look in St. Louis in 1912, the aging spitballer returned to the minor leagues. Now 39 years old, Long Bob appeared in just one game. He reached the end of the line in 1913, failing in a trial with minor-league Minneapolis and drawing his release two weeks after his 40th birthday without appearing in a single game.

=== Life after baseball ===
Ewing returned home and agreed to pitch two games for his hometown team, the Wapakoneta Reds. He had just turned 40 years old when he took the mound to face the Findlay semi-pro team on May 17, 1913. Five hundred paying fans saw Ewing strike out 12 batters while strolling to a 10-0 win. The most important game was to follow, for next up was Wapak's dreaded arch rival, the Botkins Reds.

To turn the pressure up a notch on Botkins, Wapak declared game day to be 'Ewing Day'. As he stepped in for his first at bat, time was called and Ewing was presented with a horn-grip, gold-mounted umbrella engraved "Bob, 1913." The crowd cheered lustily. Ewing struck out. Wapak eked out a 4-3 win. It was Long Bob's last local pitching appearance.

After hanging up his baseball spikes, Ewing returned to his off-season occupation of farming. He was an expert horseman as well, raising trotters which competed in races throughout the Midwest. Bob Ewing was elected to two terms as the Auglaize County Sheriff and later ran the Brunswick Cigar Store in Wapak.

=== Cincinnati Reds Hall of Fame ===
On August 12, 2001, all eight of Ewing's surviving grandchildren were present at Cinergy Field for his induction into the Cincinnati Reds Hall of Fame along with Mario Soto.

== Personal life ==
On November 5, 1905, Bob married Nelle Hunter, the daughter of a prominent Auglaize County physician. The society pages of a Cincinnati paper described as being a "handsome and clever society girl." She was an avid baseball fan in her own right.

Beginning in the 1890s, she attended what was at the time a major league record of more than 60 straight opening day games of the Reds. She had equal measures of loyalty and superstition, however. Nelle watched several games in 1905 that her husband lost. After that, she refused to go to the park when Ewing pitched, claiming her presence would 'hoodoo' him, according to the newspaper accounts.

Bob and Nelle had a son Robert, who married Sylvia Metzger. They had nine children: Christine, Coleen, Charles, Carol, Chris, Charlotte, Cliff, Cindy and Connie.

Long Bob Ewing died of cancer on June 20, 1947, at age 74.

Nelle, his wife of 42 years, survived him by a quarter-century, becoming something of a celebrity in Wapakoneta. She also remained an avid Reds fan, living to meet Pete Rose and Johnny Bench and to see the dawn of the Big Red Machine dynasty of the 1970s. She attended more than 60 consecutive opening day games before her own death on February 15, 1972, at age 91.

Bob and Nelle Ewing are buried in Walnut Hill Cemetery near New Hampshire, Ohio under a common headstone decorated with a baseball and bat.
