= Hardin Northern High School (Dola, Ohio) =

Location
- 11589 State Route 81; Dola, (Hardin County), Ohio 45835; United States
- Coordinates: 40°46′49″N 83°39′36″W

Information
- Type: Public, Coeducational high school
- Superintendent: Andrew Cano
- Principal: Josh Kauffman
- Teaching staff: 16.00 (FTE)
- Grades: 9-12
- Enrollment: 174 (2023–2024)
- Student to teacher ratio: 10.88
- Colors: Black and White
- Athletics conference: Northwest Central Conference
- Team name: Polar Bears
- Website: http://www.hn.k12.oh.us

Hardin Northern High School is a public high school in Dola, Ohio. It is the only high school in the Hardin Northern Local School district. It serves the villages of Dunkirk and Dola. Their mascot is the Polar Bears. They are a member of the Northwest Central Conference.

== Ohio High School Athletic Association State Championships ==
- Boys Football – 2004
