= WDEQ-FM =

Coordinates: 40.315°N 83.923°W

- De Graff, Ohio; United States
- Broadcast area: De Graff, Quincy and southwestern portion of Logan County
- Frequency: 91.7 MHz

Programming
- Format: Community radio

Ownership
- Owner: Riverside Local Board of Education

History
- First air date: June 4, 1969 (at 91.1 MHz)
- Call sign meaning: DeGraff-Quincy

Technical information
- Class: A (non-commercial)
- ERP: 100 watts
- HAAT: 2.9 meters (10 feet)

Links
- Website: Official Website

WDEQ-FM (91.7 FM) is an educational radio station in DeGraff, Ohio, United States. The station is owned by the Riverside Local Board of Education in Logan County. Students from Riverside High School have served as the station's announcers, newscasters, disc jockeys, and engineers.

== History ==
WDEQ-FM signed on the air on June 4, 1969, three days after the first FM radio station in Logan County, WPKO-FM which was then known as WOGM-FM, a sister station to the former WOHP (AM), subsequently WTOO (AM) and currently WBLL (AM). The station broadcasts with an effective radiated power of 100 watts according to FCC records and the Radio-Locator website (see below).

The original WDEQ first took to the air at 91.1 MHz as a ten watt operation before moving to its current frequency. For most of its history, WDEQ has operated only throughout the curricular school year during normal class times with the exception of Riverside High School sports coverage and some occasional specialty programs in the evening, as is the case with many high school-owned stations with a student air staff. Prior to WDEQ's move to its current frequency, WDEQ operated briefly at 103.1 MHz to avoid interference to and/or from the audio signal of WSYX-TV (formerly WTVN-TV) in Columbus (see reference below) and its proximity to neighboring WYSO 91.3 in Yellow Springs. WUHS at Urbana High School in Urbana, Ohio (defunct since 1989) operated with ten watts at 91.7 FM. After WUHS went dark, the 91.7 frequency was applied for by the local school district. As all analog television station transmitters left the air in June 2009 in favor of digital channels (including WSYX) interference from Channel 6 is no longer an issue.

After a few weeks hiatus of being off the air, WDEQ-FM returned to the air on Tuesday October 28, 2008 at first with a big band format and then beginning in 2009 with an oldies format, operating with extended hours during the curricular school year. WDEQ was also operating with reduced power using its secondary transmitter, while its main transmitter was awaiting repairs. Its studio and transmitter are still located at Riverside High School. For a brief time, WDEQ operated at 103.1 in the early 1990s when the former WUHS frequency became available.

The Riverside Board of Education continues to own the station, but is currently off the air since March 2010 for unknown reasons. From October 2008 until March 2010, WDEQ was programmed and managed by Gene Kirby on behalf of its owner. He also programs WRPO-LP, 93.5 MHz in Russells Point on behalf of its owner, the Village of Russells Point which formerly aired a format of big band and adult standards before it switched to smooth jazz in March 2008. In May 2009, WRPO announced a change to an oldies format. WDEQ under the branding "Q-91,7 FM" likewise aired a similar continuous oldies format during school times from October 2009 until March 2010 but aired no announcements or other programs.

WDEQ remains a non-commercial and educational radio station, so no commercial announcements are aired. However donations by listeners and underwriting by local businesses are encouraged. To this day, WDEQ remains off the air and is not known at this time when it will return to the air.

WVXU 91.7 in Cincinnati can be received in some areas outside of WDEQ's 100 watt signal on some high quality car radios.
