= De Graff, Ohio =

- Village
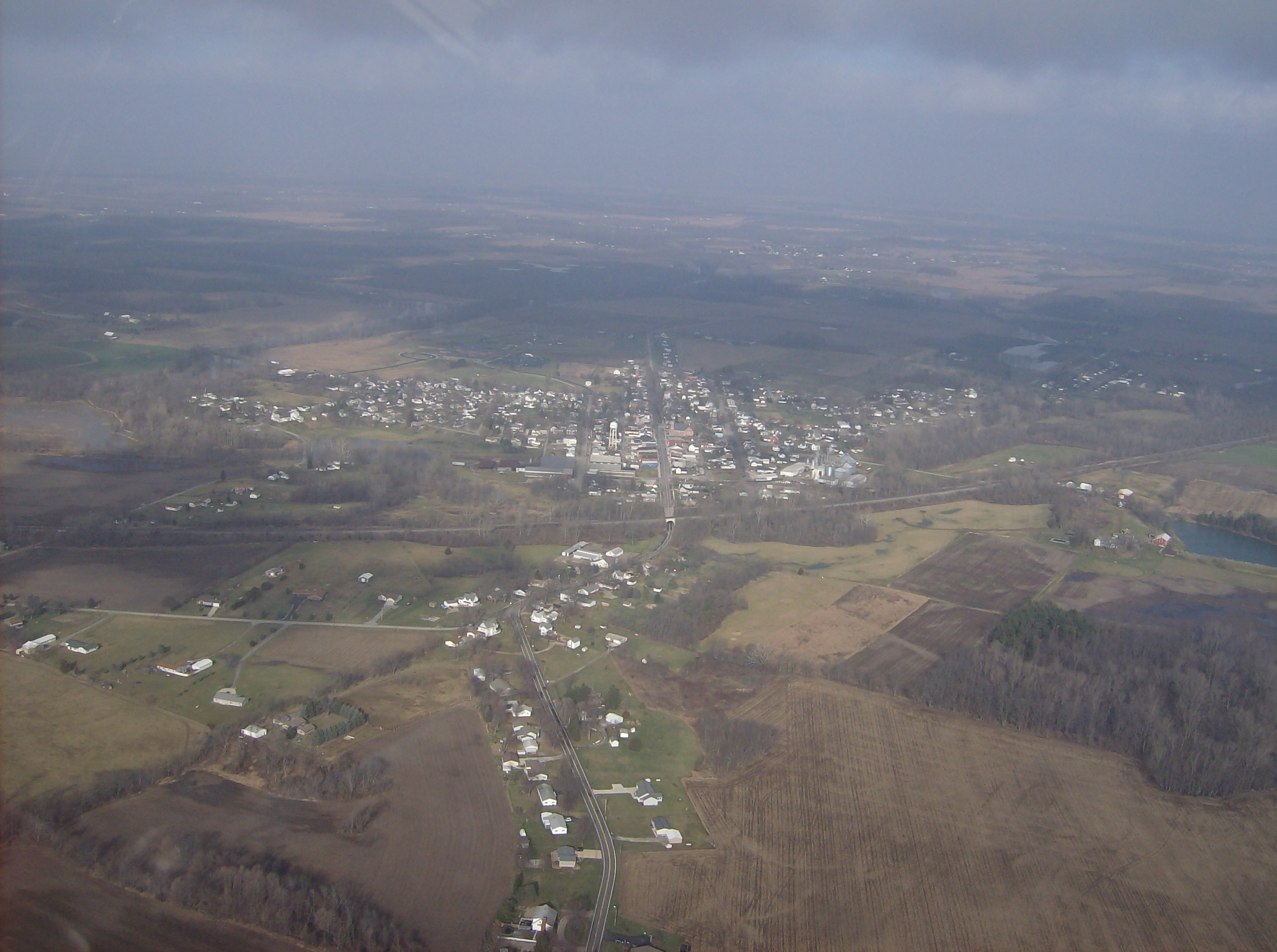
- Aerial view of De Graff from the southeast

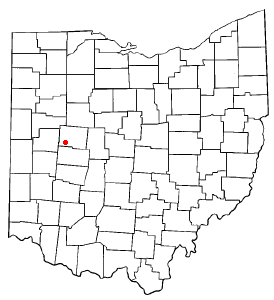
- Location of De Graff, Ohio

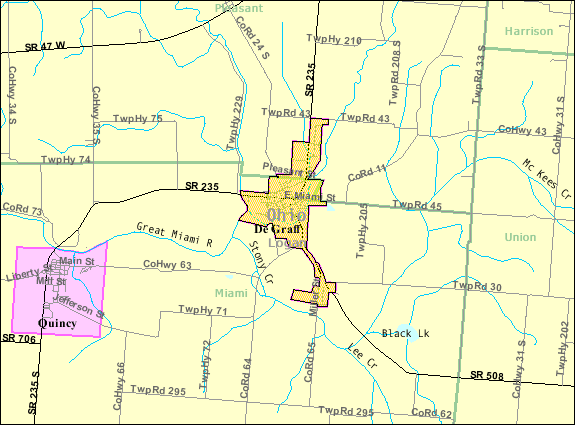
- Detailed map of De Graff
- Coordinates: 40°18′46″N 83°55′00″W
- Country: United States
- State: Ohio
- County: Logan
- Townships: Miami, Pleasant

Area
  - Total: 1.00 sq mi (2.60 km^{2})
  - Land: 1.00 sq mi (2.60 km^{2})
  - Water: 0 sq mi (0.00 km^{2})
- Elevation: 1,004 ft (306 m)

Population (2020)
  - Total: 1,250
  - Estimate (2023): 1,251
  - Density: 1,247/sq mi (481.4/km^{2})
- Time zone: UTC-5 (Eastern (EST))
  - Summer (DST): UTC-4 (EDT)
- ZIP code: 43318
- Area codes: 937, 326
- FIPS code: 39-21378
- GNIS feature ID: 2398692

De Graff is a village located in Logan County, Ohio, United States. The population was 1,250 at the 2020 census.

== History ==
De Graff was named in honor of a railroad official. Different sources format the community's name in several different ways: besides the official De Graff, the name has been rendered De Graft, DeGraff, Degraff, and Degraft.

== Geography ==
According to the United States Census Bureau, the village has a total area of 1.01 square miles (2.62 km^{2}), all of it land.

== Demographics ==
Historical population
| Census | Pop. | Note | %± |
|---|---|---|---|
| 1870 | 624 | | — |
| 1880 | 965 | | 54.6% |
| 1890 | 1,076 | | 11.5% |
| 1900 | 1,150 | | 6.9% |
| 1910 | 1,082 | | −5.9% |
| 1920 | 932 | | −13.9% |
| 1930 | 849 | | −8.9% |
| 1940 | 796 | | −6.2% |
| 1950 | 972 | | 22.1% |
| 1960 | 996 | | 2.5% |
| 1970 | 1,117 | | 12.1% |
| 1980 | 1,358 | | 21.6% |
| 1990 | 1,331 | | −2.0% |
| 2000 | 1,212 | | −8.9% |
| 2010 | 1,285 | | 6.0% |
| 2020 | 1,250 | | −2.7% |
| 2023 (est.) | 1,251 | ▲ | 0.1% |
U.S. Decennial Census

=== 2010 census ===
As of the census of 2010, there were 1,285 people, 476 households, and 347 families residing in the village. The population density was 1,272.3 inhabitants per square mile (491.2/km^{2}). There were 536 housing units at an average density of 530.7 per square mile (204.9/km^{2}). The racial makeup of the village was 97.5% White, 0.9% African American, 0.3% Native American, 0.2% Asian, 0.2% Pacific Islander, 0.2% from other races, and 0.7% from two or more races. Hispanic or Latino of any race were 0.2% of the population.

There were 476 households, of which 40.3% had children under the age of 18 living with them, 56.7% were married couples living together, 11.1% had a female householder with no husband present, 5.0% had a male householder with no wife present, and 27.1% were non-families. 25.6% of all households were made up of individuals, and 11.2% had someone living alone who was 65 years of age or older. The average household size was 2.70 and the average family size was 3.21.

The median age in the village was 34.8 years. 30.7% of residents were under the age of 18; 5.8% were between the ages of 18 and 24; 25.9% were from 25 to 44; 24.6% were from 45 to 64; and 12.9% were 65 years of age or older. The gender makeup of the village was 48.9% male and 51.1% female.

=== 2000 census ===
As of the census of 2000, there were 1,212 people, 479 households, and 329 families residing in the village. The population density was 1,414.4 inhabitants per square mile (546.1/km^{2}). There were 515 housing units at an average density of 601.0 per square mile (232.0/km^{2}). The racial makeup of the village was 99.67% White, 0.17% African American and 0.17% Asian. Hispanic or Latino of any race were 0.17% of the population.

There were 479 households, out of which 31.9% had children under the age of 18 living with them, 54.7% were married couples living together, 9.0% had a female householder with no husband present, and 31.3% were non-families. 29.2% of all households were made up of individuals, and 14.6% had someone living alone who was 65 years of age or older. The average household size was 2.53 and the average family size was 3.12.

In the village, the population was spread out, with 26.7% under the age of 18, 10.3% from 18 to 24, 27.0% from 25 to 44, 23.2% from 45 to 64, and 12.9% who were 65 years of age or older. The median age was 35 years. For every 100 females, there were 99.0 males. For every 100 females age 18 and over, there were 92.4 males.

The median income for a household in the village was $34,833, and the median income for a family was $43,365. Males had a median income of $35,859 versus $25,500 for females. The per capita income for the village was $18,548. About 8.0% of families and 8.2% of the population were below the poverty line, including 12.6% of those under age 18 and 6.9% of those age 65 or over.

== Transportation ==
De Graff is located at the intersection of State Routes 235 and 508.

== Education ==
Riverside School District, including Riverside High School, serves the children of the De Graff area. It also owns WDEQ, a non-commercial community radio station.

A branch of the Logan County District Library serves the De Graff community.

== Notable people ==
- Marion Koogler McNay - artist and philanthropist
