= Wayne Township, Auglaize County, Ohio =

Township in Ohio, US

- Township
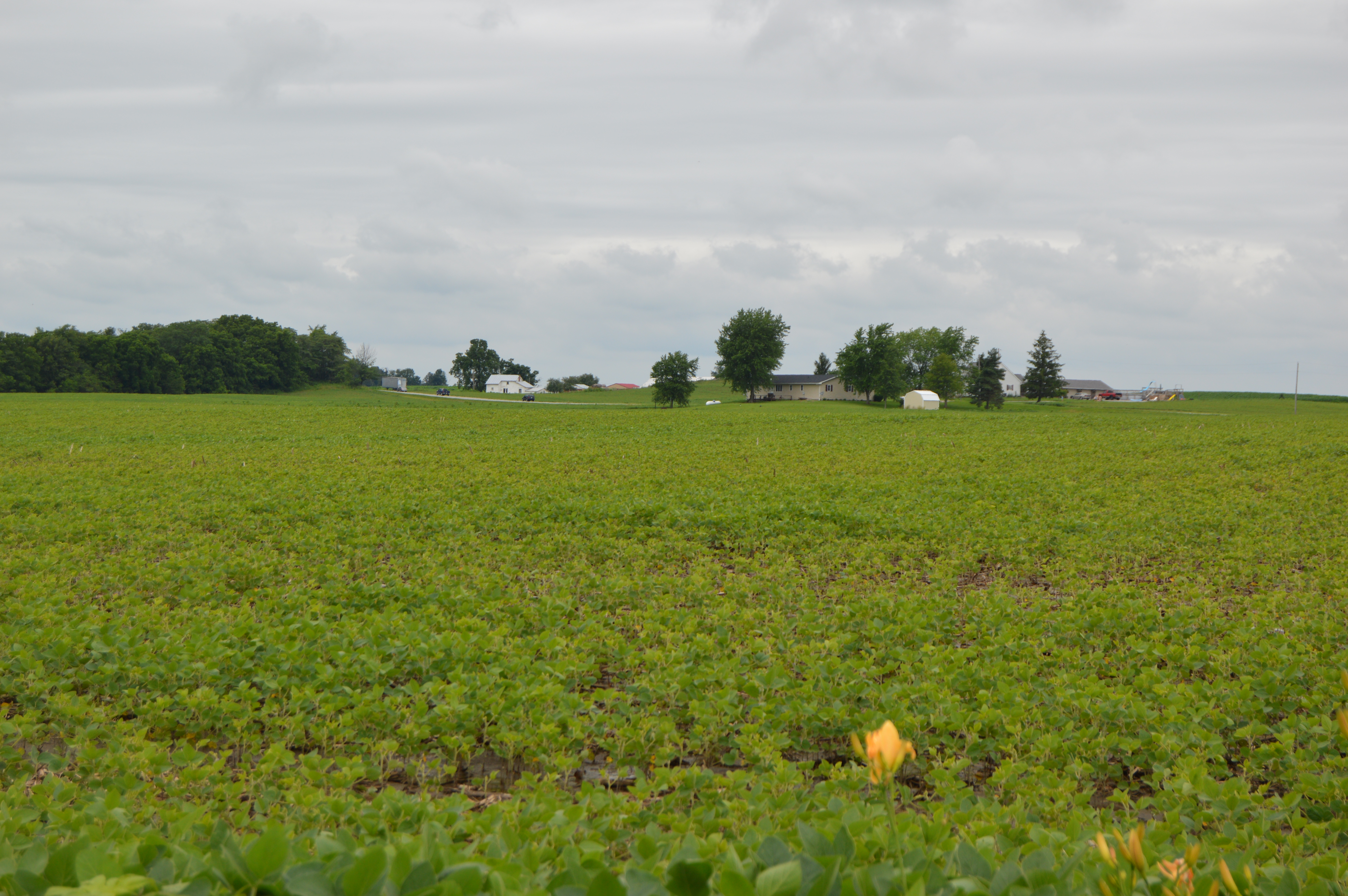
- Fields along State Route 67 near Holden

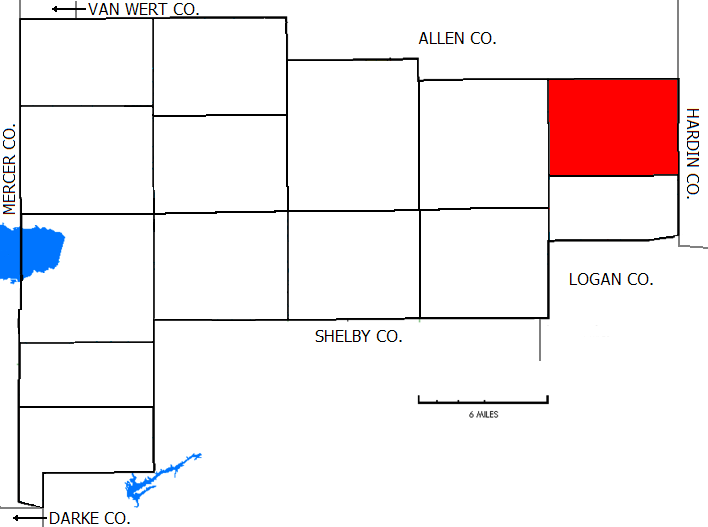
- Location of Wayne Township in Auglaize County
- Coordinates: 40°36′30″N 83°57′48″W
- Country: United States
- State: Ohio
- County: Auglaize

Area
  - Total: 27.0 sq mi (69.9 km^{2})
  - Land: 27.0 sq mi (69.9 km^{2})
  - Water: 0 sq mi (0.0 km^{2})
- Elevation: 1,033 ft (315 m)

Population (2020)
  - Total: 1,508
  - Density: 55.9/sq mi (21.6/km^{2})
- Time zone: UTC-5 (Eastern (EST))
  - Summer (DST): UTC-4 (EDT)
- FIPS code: 39-82054
- GNIS feature ID: 1085775

Wayne Township is one of the fourteen townships of Auglaize County, Ohio, United States. The 2020 census found 1,508 people in the township.

== Geography ==
Located in the northeastern part of the county it borders the following townships:

- Auglaize Township, Allen County - north
- Marion Township, Hardin County - northeast corner
- Roundhead Township, Hardin County - east
- Goshen Township - south
- Union Township - west
- Perry Township, Allen County - northwest corner

The village of Waynesfield is located in southwestern Wayne Township.

According to the U.S. Census Bureau the area of the township is 27.0 square miles (69.9 km^{2}).

== Name and history ==
It is named for General "Mad" Anthony Wayne and is one of twenty Wayne Townships statewide.

The township was formed in either 1834 or 1836 while still part of Allen County.

== Government ==
The township is governed by a three-member board of trustees who are elected in November of odd-numbered years to four-year terms beginning the next January 1. Two trustees are elected in the year after the presidential election and one is elected in the year before it.

The township fiscal officer is elected in November of the year before the presidential election. The officer serves a four-year term beginning the next April 1. Vacancies on the board of trustees or in the fiscal office are filled by the remaining trustees.

== Public services ==
Children in Wayne Township attend schools of the Waynesfield-Goshen Local School District except in the southeast corner of the township where they are served by the Upper Scioto Valley Local School District.

The township is served by the Waynesfield (zip code 45896) post office except for two small sections served by the Wapakoneta (45895) post office and the Harrod (45850) post office.
