= Fairbanks High School (Milford Center, Ohio) =

School in Ohio, United States

Coordinates: 40°09′38″N 83°23′32″W

Location
- 11158 State Route 38; Milford Center, (Union County), Ohio 43045; United States

Information
- Type: Public high school
- Principal: Jerry Obney
- Staff: 19.94 (FTE)
- Enrollment: 365 (2023-2024)
- Student to teacher ratio: 18.30
- Colors: Red and white
- Nickname: Panthers

Fairbanks High School is a public high school in Milford Center, Union County, Ohio, United States, and the only high school in the Fairbanks Local School District. The school's colors are red and white, and the mascot is the Panther.

== History ==
Fairbanks High School was named after U.S. Senator and Vice President Charles W. Fairbanks, who was born and raised in nearby Unionville Center, Ohio. The Fairbanks Local School District was founded in 1960, and the current building was erected in 1961. It has been recognized on the State's Report Card as an 'Excellent' High School since 1999, and more recently under the new reporting system, it received an 'A' rating. In 2012, the U.S. Department of Education recognized the school in the "No Child Left Behind–Blue Ribbon Schools Program (NCLB-BRS)", a national recognition program honoring elementary and secondary schools in the United States that make significant progress in closing achievement gaps or whose students achieve at the highest levels in their state. In 2014, there were approximately 300 students enrolled.

== Ohio High School Athletic Association State Championships ==
- Boys soccer — 2026
- Girls' volleyball – 1977
