= Dola, Ohio =

- Census-designated place
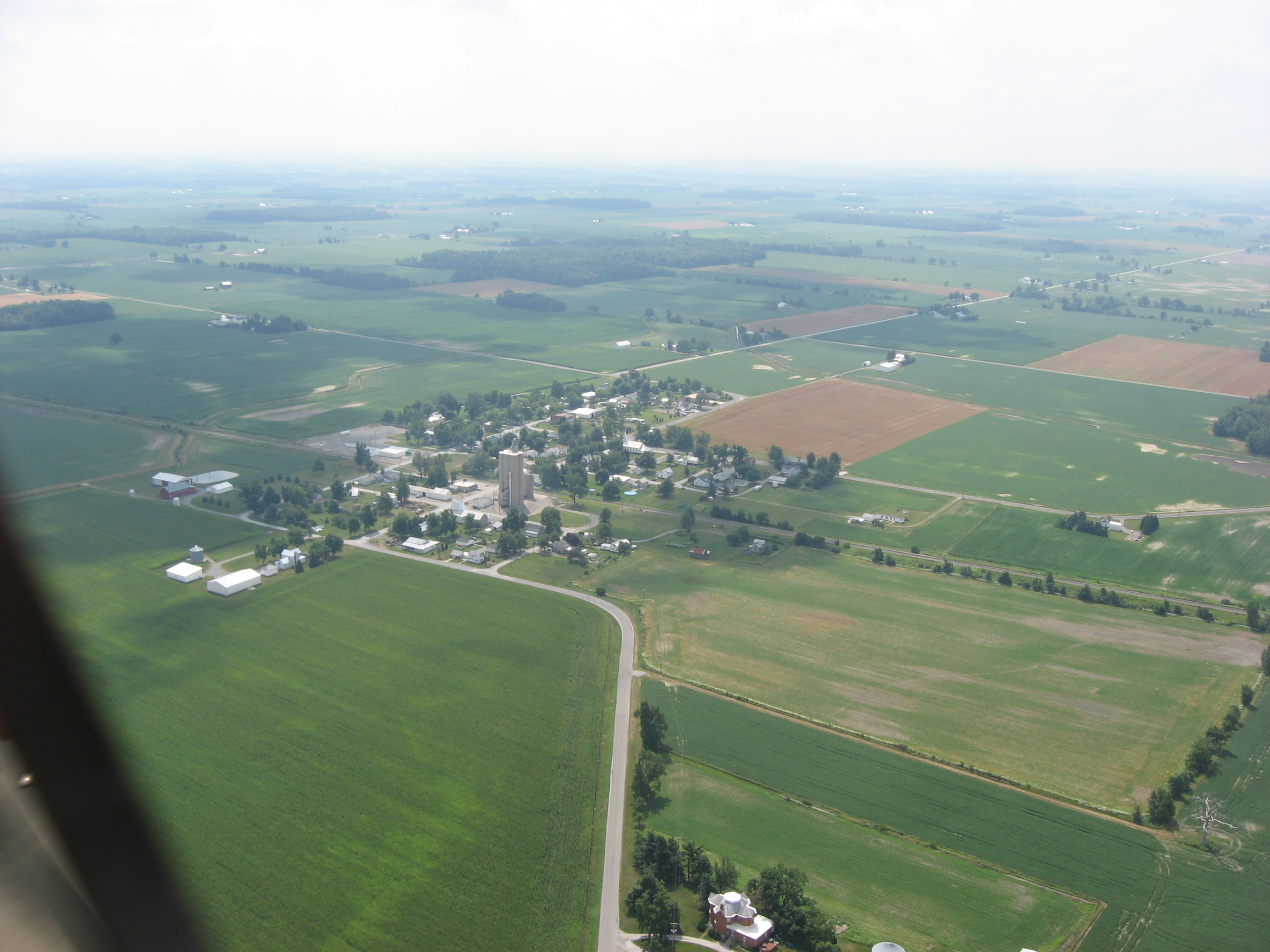
- Aerial view of Dola

- Location within Ohio Location within the United States
- Coordinates: 40°47′05″N 83°41′56″W
- Country: United States
- State: Ohio
- County: Hardin
- Township: Washington

Area
  - Total: 0.83 sq mi (2.15 km^{2})
  - Land: 0.83 sq mi (2.15 km^{2})
  - Water: 0 sq mi (0.00 km^{2})
- Elevation: 938 ft (286 m)

Population (2020)
  - Total: 143
  - Density: 172/sq mi (66.4/km^{2})
- Time zone: UTC-5 (Eastern (EST))
  - Summer (DST): UTC-4 (EDT)
- ZIP Code: 45835
- Area code: 419
- FIPS code: 39-22260
- GNIS feature ID: 2628884

Dola is a census-designated place in central Washington Township, Hardin County, Ohio, United States. As of the 2020 United States Census it had a population of 143. It has a post office with the ZIP code 45835.

== History ==
Dola was originally called "North Washington", and under the latter name was platted in 1852. A post office was established as "North Washington" in 1854, and the name was changed to "Dola" in 1906.

== Geography ==
Dola is located along State Route 81 between Ada and Dunkirk, 12 miles (19 km) by road north-northwest of the city of Kenton, the county seat of Hardin County. Dola lies at the headwaters of the Eagle Creek, which flows north to meet the Blanchard River in Findlay.

According to the U.S. Census Bureau, the Dola CDP has an area of 0.83 square miles (2.15 km^{2}), all of it land.

== Demographics ==
Historical population
Census	Pop.	Note	%±
2020	143		—
U.S. Decennial Census

== Education ==
Hardin Northern High School is 2 miles (3 km) east of the center of Dola, which is frequently named as the location of this high school, and sports media such as JJ Huddle often refer to the school as "Dola Hardin Northern".

== Notable people ==
- Juli Fulks, coach of the Marshall Thundering Herd women's basketball
