= Lehman Catholic High School =

Location
- 2400 St. Marys Avenue; Sidney, Ohio 45365-8902; United States
- 40°18′47″N 84°10′21″W

Information
- Type: Private, Coeducational
- Motto: “Be Great!”
- Religious affiliation: Roman Catholic
- Established: July 1, 1970
- Oversight: Sisters of Charity; Roman Catholic Archdiocese of Cincinnati
- President: Tom Stein
- Principal: Veronica Gaier
- Grades: 9–12
- Enrollment: 169 (2021–22)
- Colors: Royal blue and gold
- Athletics conference: Three Rivers Conference
- Team name: Cavaliers
- Accreditation: North Central Association of Colleges and Schools
- Newspaper: The Cavalier Crier
- Yearbook: Cavalcade
- Website: www.lehmancatholic.com

Lehman Catholic High School is a private co-educational high school located in Sidney, Ohio, United States. It is owned and operated by the Roman Catholic Archdiocese of Cincinnati and served by the Sisters of Charity of Cincinnati. The school is named after Edward C. Lehman, who served as pastor of Holy Angels Parish for 34 years and oversaw the construction of Holy Angels High School. Lehman Catholic was established in 1970 as a result of the consolidation of Holy Angels High School, established in 1889, and Piqua Catholic High School, established in 1924. The school's colors are royal blue and gold and athletic teams are known as the Cavaliers. As of 2022, the principal is Veronica Gaier.

== History ==
The current building in which houses Lehman today was built in 1954 as Holy Angels High School and five additional classrooms were added in 1965. In 1970 a second building for a football locker room and bus garage was constructed, and later in the fall Holy Angels and Piqua Catholic High School joined to form Lehman Catholic High School. A few more projects were completed, such as the construction of an observatory with a 16-inch (410 mm) Newtonian Telescope in 1993, and a 52,000 square feet (4,800 m^{2}) gymnasium, a computer center, updated science labs, media center and facilities for music in 1997. Recently, Lehman has undergone Renovation for STEM+MM along with the addition of new classes starting in the summer of 2016, and is expected to be completed in 2017-2018.

== Curriculum ==
Advanced Placement program in Calculus, English, Foreign Language, Biology, Chemistry, and College-preparatory in all other subject areas for grades 9-12. The school has received several governor's awards for science, and is accredited by the North Central Association of Colleges and Schools. Voted one of the best schools. Lehman includes three academic tracks: Advanced College Preparatory, College Preparatory, and Career Studies.

== Extracurriculars ==
Athletics play an integral role in the life of Lehman students. The school fields 18 varsity sports including: Soccer (men's & women's), volleyball (women's), football, Tennis (men's & women's), Cross-Country (men's & women's), Basketball (men's & women's), Swimming/Diving (men's & women's), Track (men's & women's), Softball, Baseball, Wrestling, and Golf (men's). The school's mascot, the Cavalier has been in use since the school's merger in July 1970. Prior to the consolidation, the Cavaliers were the name of the former Piqua Catholic High School's football, basketball and baseball teams while the former Sidney Holy Angels High School basketball and baseball teams were known as the Wings. The original Cavalier logo was inspired by a drawn caricature in 1950 depicting Jose Ferrer as Cyrano de Bergerac noted especially for its long nose. It was used throughout the 1950s and 1960s by the former Piqua Catholic and was later incorporated during Lehman's early years. The current logo is an image of a blue broad brimmed hat above two criss-crossed swords fronted by the team's emblem...with a secondary logo, the gold colored letters "LC" (interconnected with each other) with a royal blue background is used in sporting gear such as football helmets, polo shirts, ballcaps and related promotional items. Lehman's music program includes its marching and concert bands and the Lehman Limelighters song and dance troupe. Katie Welch is the current director.

=== State championships ===
- Boys cross country - 1980
- Boys golf – 1974
- Girls volleyball – 2000, 2005, 2010
