= Riverside High School (De Graff, Ohio) =

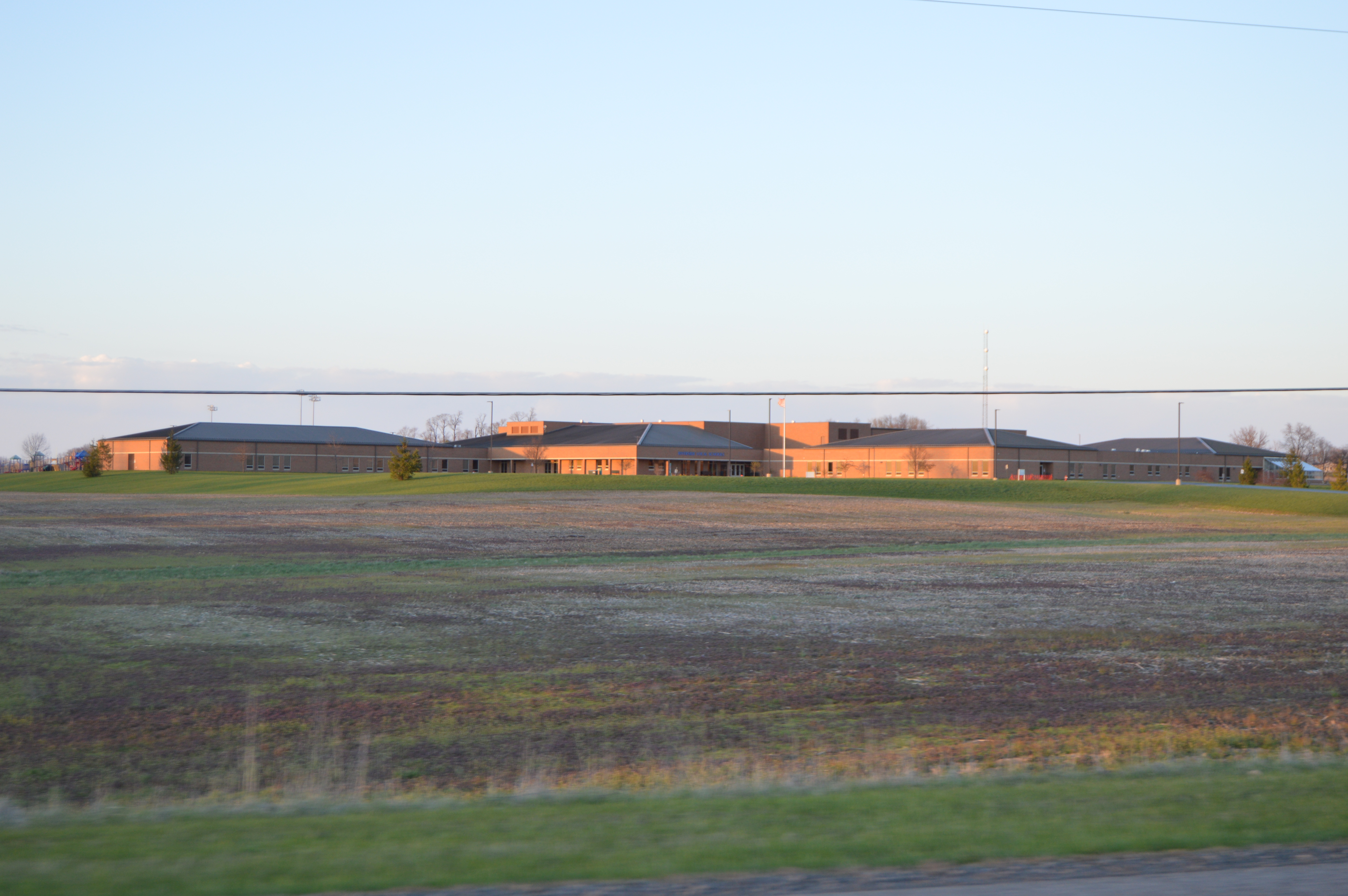
- Seen from State Route 235

Location
- 2096 County Road 24 South; De Graff, Logan County, Ohio 43318; United States; 40°18′56″N 83°55′23″W

Information
- Type: Public, Coeducational high school
- Established: 1960
- School district: Riverside Local Schools
- Superintendent: Scott Mann
- Principal: Kelly Kauffman
- Grades: 7-12
- Enrollment: 260 (2024-2025)
- Colors: Red and Royal Blue
- Athletics: basketball, volleyball, softball, baseball, football, golf, track, cheerleading, bowling, and wrestling
- Athletics conference: Three Rivers Conference
- Mascot: Pirate
- Team name: Pirates
- Athletic Director: Rod Yoder
- Website: www.riverside.k12.oh.us

Riverside High School is a public high school in De Graff, Ohio, United States. It is the only high school in the Riverside Local Schools district.

== Background ==
Riverside Local School District was formed by the consolidation of Quincy and DeGraff School Districts in 1960. The state of Ohio had revoked Quincy School District's charter for having too few students, which resulted in the need for consolidation. From 1960 to 2002, the elementary facilities were housed in the former Quincy building and junior high and high school facilities were contained within the DeGraff building. Beginning with the 2002–2003 school year, Riverside Local School District merged facilities into a new building, which housed all grades, K-12. The building was built on district-owned farm land to the northwest of the former high school. All athletic facilities were replaced. The former elementary and high school buildings were demolished. As of the 2007–2008 school year, the district had 803 total students and 97 employees, 58 of which were teachers.

The district has a non-commercial radio station, WDEQ-FM 91.7 mHz.
