= Roundhead, Ohio =

Unincorporated community in Ohio, U.S.

Coordinates: 40°33′34″N 83°50′07″W

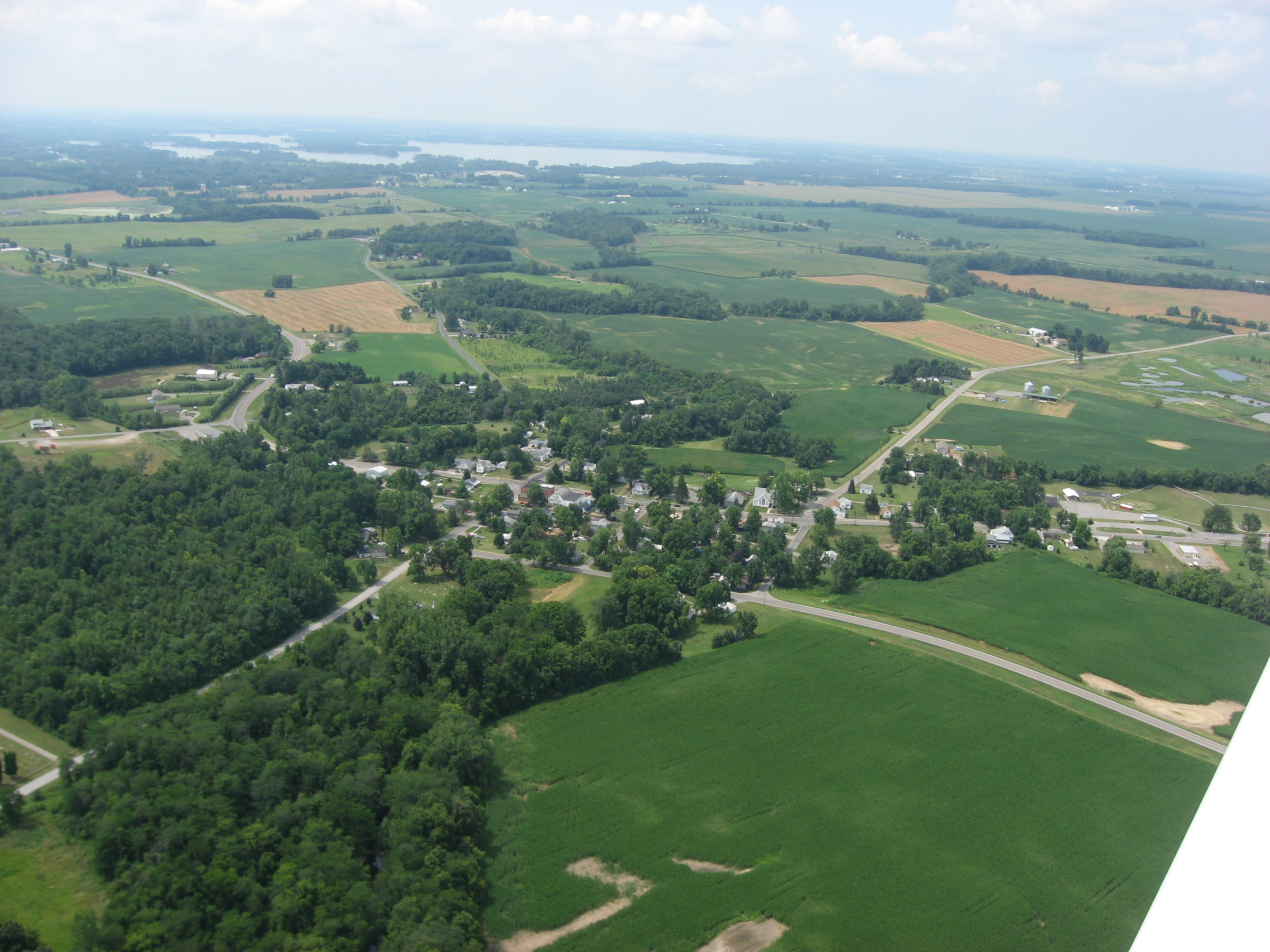
Aerial view of Roundhead

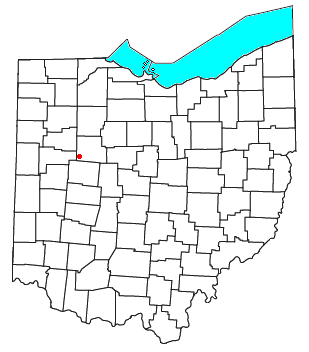
Location of Roundhead, Ohio

Roundhead is an unincorporated community in southeastern Roundhead Township, Hardin County, Ohio, United States. It has a post office with the ZIP code 43346.

== History ==
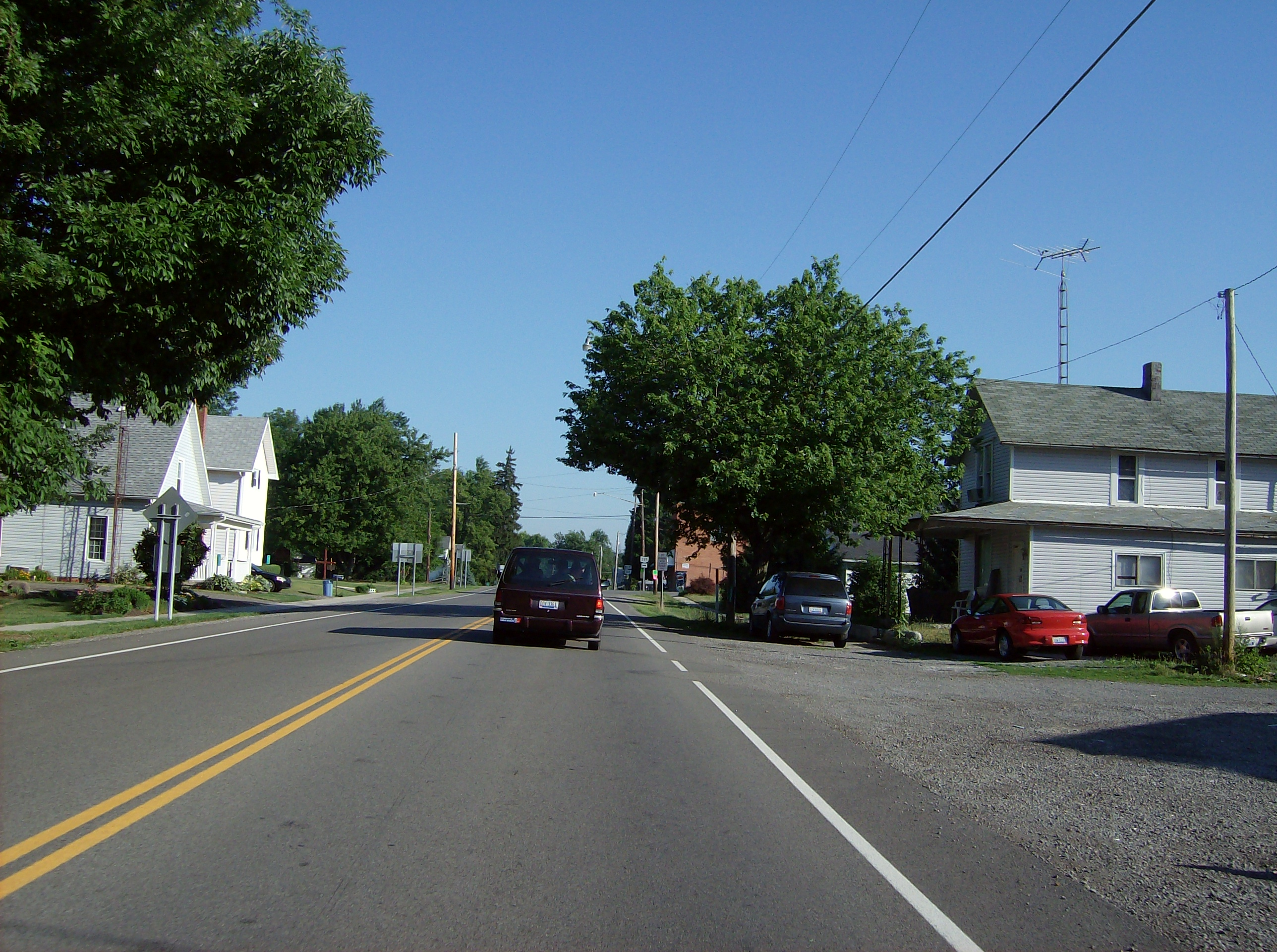
Along State Routes 117 and 235 in the southern part of Roundhead

The first Euro-American settlement at Roundhead was made in 1832 on the site of a former Wyandot Indian village. The community is named for the Wyandot chief Roundhead. During its history, the community has also been referred to as "Round Head", "Round Heads", "Round Headstown", and "Roundheads Town". A post office has been in operation at Roundhead since 1837.

An archaeological site, the Zimmerman Kame, is located in the Roundhead vicinity; it is listed on the National Register of Historic Places.

== Geography ==
Located at an altitude of 1,004 feet (306 m), it sits at the intersection of State Routes 117, 235, and 385, 2.75 miles (4.43 km) north of the northeast corner of Indian Lake and 13 miles (21 km) southwest of the city of Kenton, the county seat of Hardin County. Despite Roundhead's proximity to Indian Lake and the Great Miami River, which flows out of it to the Ohio River at Cincinnati, the community is drained by the headwaters of the Scioto River, which meets the Ohio River at Portsmouth.

== Community ==
Besides its post office, the community includes a Park, a volunteer fire department, a United Methodist Church, a restaurant/bar, and two cemeteries.
