= Waynesfield, Ohio =

- Village
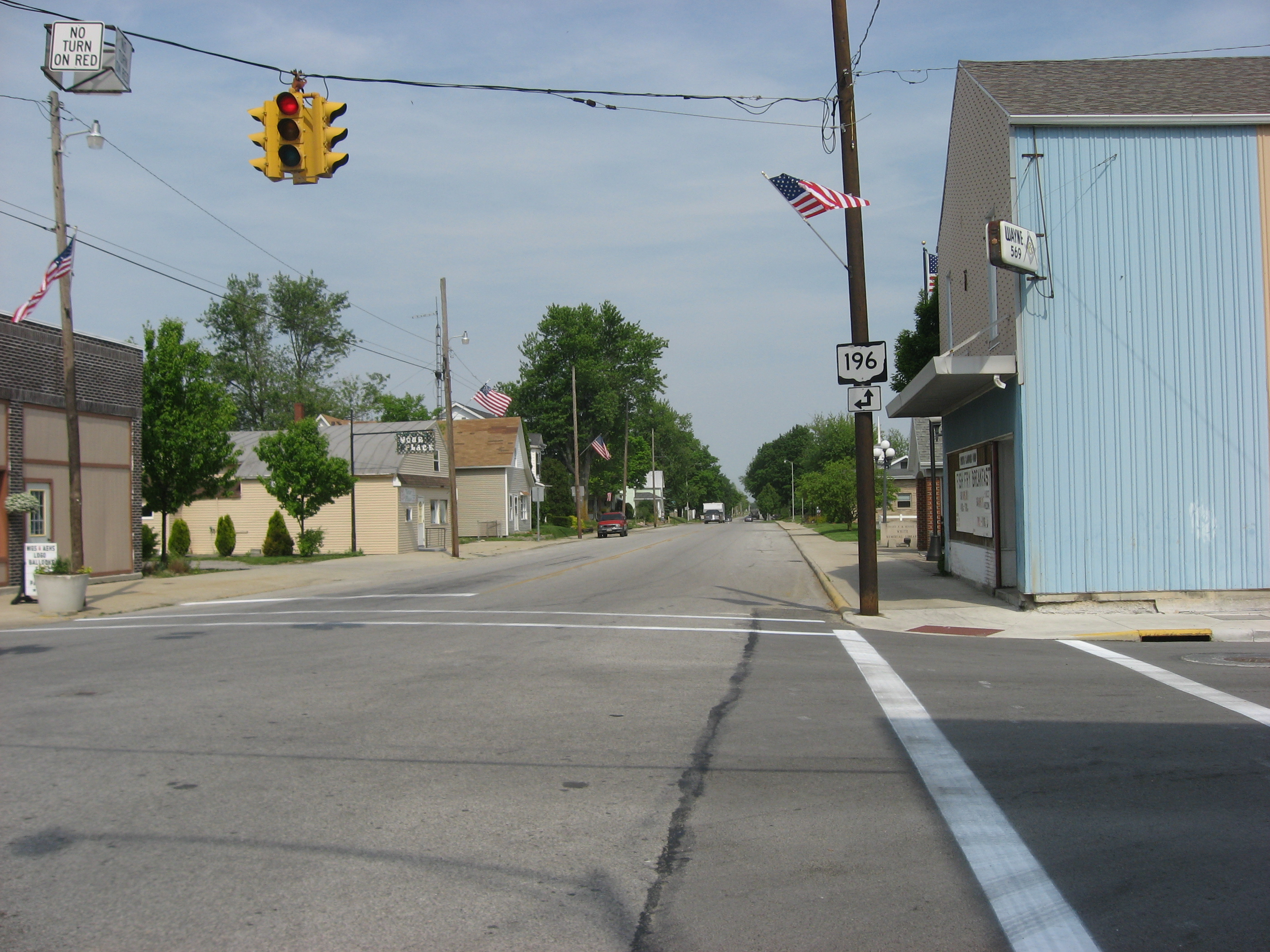
- Downtown Waynesfield

- Logo

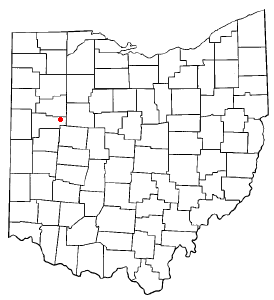
- Location of Waynesfield, Ohio

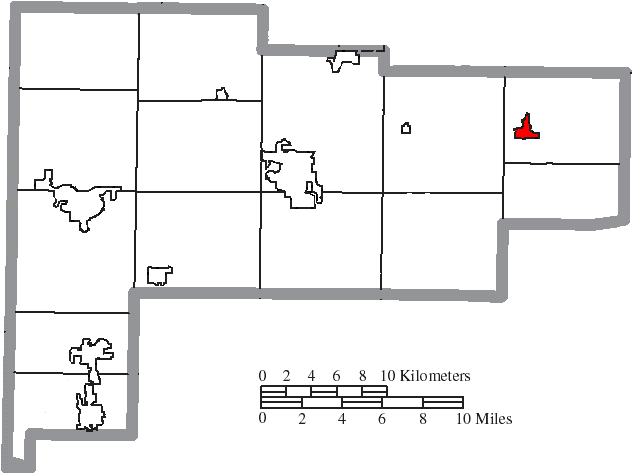
- Location of Waynesfield in Auglaize County
- Coordinates: 40°36′09″N 83°58′26″W
- Country: United States
- State: Ohio
- County: Auglaize
- Township: Wayne

Government
  - Mayor: Rodney Luma

Area
  - Total: 0.66 sq mi (1.72 km^{2})
  - Land: 0.66 sq mi (1.72 km^{2})
  - Water: 0 sq mi (0.00 km^{2})
- Elevation: 1,066 ft (325 m)

Population (2020)
  - Total: 749
  - Density: 1,128.9/sq mi (435.88/km^{2})
- Time zone: UTC-5 (Eastern (EST))
  - Summer (DST): UTC-4 (EDT)
- ZIP code: 45896
- Area code: 419
- FIPS code: 39-82390
- GNIS feature ID: 2400116
- Website: waynesfieldohio.com

Waynesfield is a village in Auglaize County, Ohio, United States. The population was 749 at the 2020 census. It is included in the Wapakoneta, Ohio Micropolitan Statistical Area.

== History ==
Waynesfield was founded on July 1, 1848.

== Geography ==
According to the United States Census Bureau, the village has a total area of 0.74 square miles (1.92 km^{2}), all land.

== Demographics ==
Historical population
Census	Pop.	Note	%±
1880	306		—
1890	480		56.9%
1900	542		12.9%
1910	542		0.0%
1920	584		7.7%
1930	561		−3.9%
1940	592		5.5%
1950	733		23.8%
1960	765		4.4%
1970	704		−8.0%
1980	826		17.3%
1990	831		0.6%
2000	803		−3.4%
2010	847		5.5%
2020	749		−11.6%
U.S. Decennial Census

=== 2010 census ===
As of the census of 2010, there were 847 people, 309 households, and 218 families living in the village. The population density was 1,144.6 inhabitants per square mile (441.9/km^{2}). There were 350 housing units at an average density of 473.0 per square mile (182.6/km^{2}). The racial makeup of the village was 97.8% White, 0.6% African American, 0.2% Native American, 0.1% Asian, 0.7% from other races, and 0.6% from two or more races. Hispanic or Latino of any race were 2.1% of the population.

There were 309 households, of which 42.1% had children under the age of 18 living with them, 50.8% were married couples living together, 12.3% had a female householder with no husband present, 7.4% had a male householder with no wife present, and 29.4% were non-families. 25.6% of all households were made up of individuals, and 8.4% had someone living alone who was 65 years of age or older. The average household size was 2.74 and the average family size was 3.29.

The median age in the village was 33.5 years. 31.4% of residents were under the age of 18; 8.4% were between the ages of 18 and 24; 26.3% were from 25 to 44; 23.1% were from 45 to 64; and 10.7% were 65 years of age or older. The gender makeup of the village was 47.9% male and 52.1% female.

=== 2000 census ===
As of the census of 2000, there were 803 people, 307 households, and 213 families living in the village. The population density was 1,137.4 inhabitants per square mile (439.2/km^{2}). There were 323 housing units at an average density of 457.5 per square mile (176.6/km^{2}). The racial makeup of the village was 97.38% White, 0.12% African American, 0.62% Native American, and 1.87% from two or more races. Hispanic or Latino of any race were 1.37% of the population.

There were 307 households, out of which 34.5% had children under the age of 18 living with them, 55.7% were married couples living together, 9.4% had a female householder with no husband present, and 30.6% were non-families. 26.4% of all households were made up of individuals, and 11.4% had someone living alone who was 65 years of age or older. The average household size was 2.62 and the average family size was 3.17.

In the village, the population was spread out, with 30.4% under the age of 18, 8.2% from 18 to 24, 29.1% from 25 to 44, 19.7% from 45 to 64, and 12.6% who were 65 years of age or older. The median age was 32 years. For every 100 females there were 93.0 males. For every 100 females age 18 and over, there were 91.4 males.

The median income for a household in the village was $29,712, and the median income for a family was $40,000. Males had a median income of $32,250 versus $19,453 for females. The per capita income for the village was $13,944. About 6.3% of families and 10.6% of the population were below the poverty line, including 12.5% of those under age 18 and 5.5% of those age 65 or over.

== Education ==
Waynesfield-Goshen Local Schools District operates in one PK-12 building which consists of a high school (Waynesfield-Goshen High School), middle school and an elementary school. The school's athletic programs' mascot is the Tigers and competes in the NWCC (Northwest Central Conference).

Waynesfield has a public library, a branch of the Auglaize County Public Library.

== Sports and leisure ==
Prairie View Golf Club built in 1991 is a Public 18 Hole Golf Course with well groomed fairways and greens. The course rating is a 70.0 and a slope rating of 113.

Waynesfield Raceway Park (built in 1993) is a 40-acre motor sports facility which includes a 1/3 mile high-banked dirt oval race track. The facility also includes a 1/5 mile dirt oval race track for kart/quarter midget racing. It is located a mile south of town.
