= Goshen Township, Auglaize County, Ohio =

Township in Ohio, US

- Township
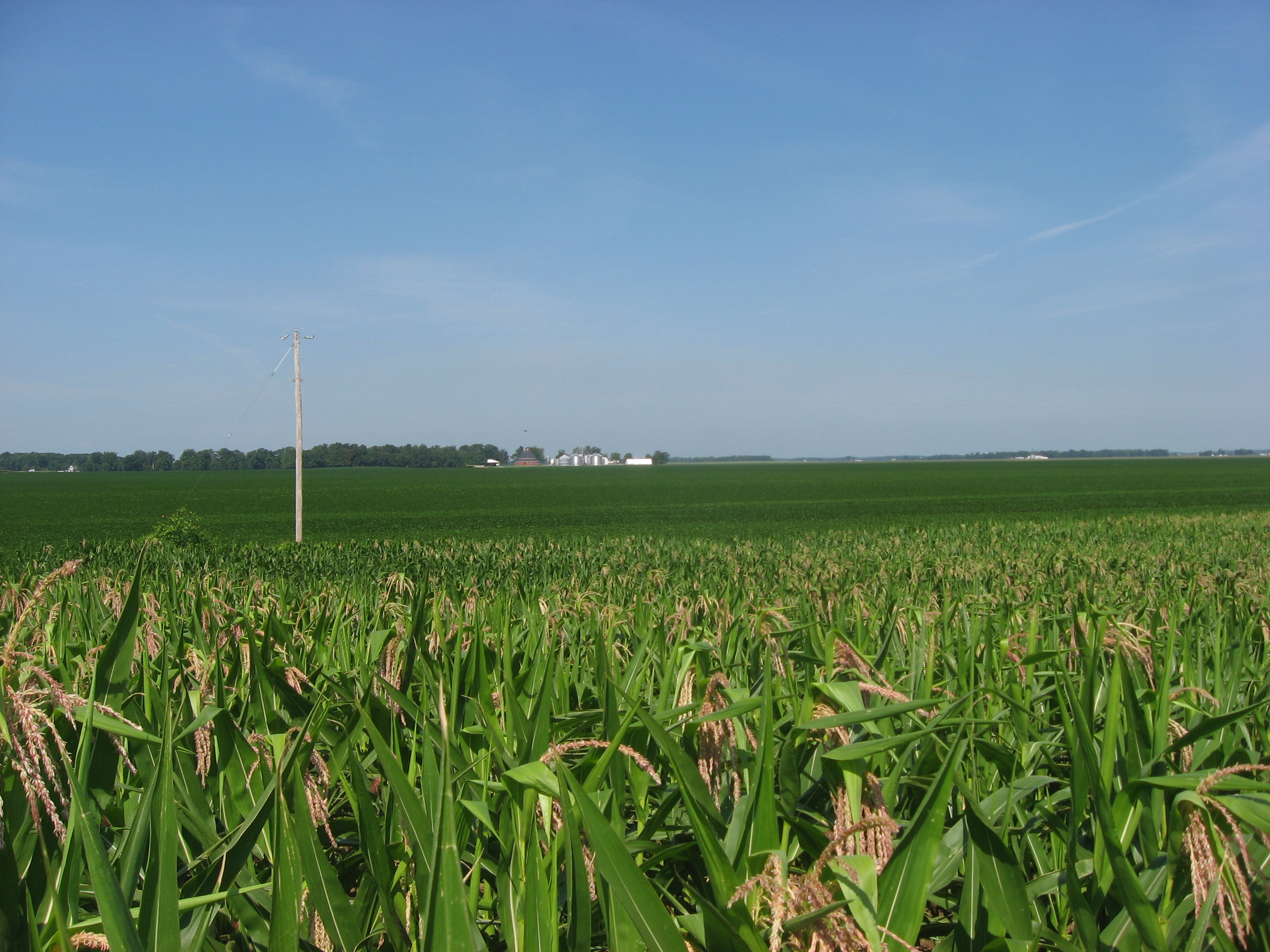
- Fields in southeastern Goshen Township

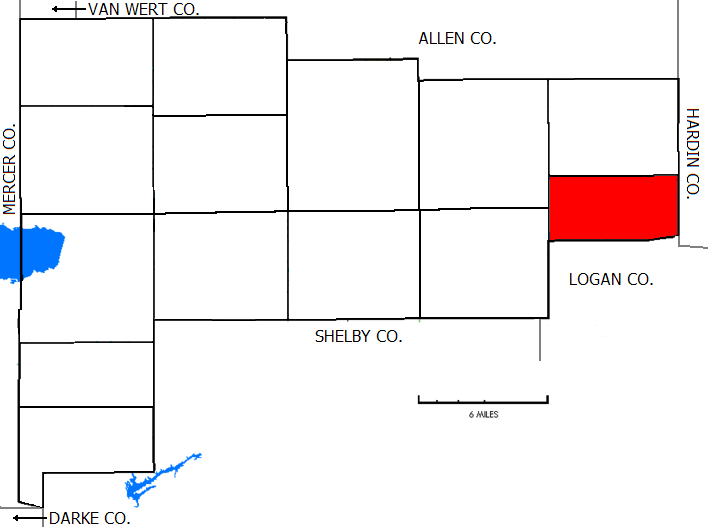
- Location of Goshen Township in Auglaize County
- Coordinates: 40°33′21″N 83°57′6″W
- Country: United States
- State: Ohio
- County: Auglaize

Area
  - Total: 17.9 sq mi (46.3 km^{2})
  - Land: 17.9 sq mi (46.3 km^{2})
  - Water: 0 sq mi (0.0 km^{2})
- Elevation: 1,024 ft (312 m)

Population (2020)
  - Total: 472
  - Density: 26.4/sq mi (10.2/km^{2})
- Time zone: UTC-5 (Eastern (EST))
  - Summer (DST): UTC-4 (EDT)
- FIPS code: 39-30954
- GNIS feature ID: 1085765

Goshen Township is one of the fourteen townships of Auglaize County, Ohio, United States. The 2020 census found 472 people in the township.

== Geography ==
Located in the southern part of the eastern edge of the county, it borders the following townships:

- Wayne Township - north
- Roundhead Township, Hardin County - east
- Stokes Township, Logan County - south
- Clay Township - southwest
- Union Township - northwest

No municipalities are located in Goshen Township, although the unincorporated community of New Hampshire lies in the township's center.

Goshen Township contains slightly less than eighteen square miles. It is the smallest township in terms of both population and area in Auglaize County. The southeastern part of the township is located in the Virginia Military District.

== Name and history ==
It is one of seven Goshen Townships statewide.

Originally part of Allen County, the township was formed in 1836.

The township was also involved in one of the last county border changes in Ohio. This change occurred in 1888 when part of Stokes Township in Logan County was exchanged to Clay Township for part of Goshen Township.

== Government ==
The township is governed by a three-member board of trustees, who are elected in November of odd-numbered years to a four-year term beginning on the following January 1. Two are elected in the year after the presidential election and one is elected in the year before it. There is also an elected township fiscal officer, who serves a four-year term beginning on April 1 of the year after the election, which is held in November of the year before the presidential election. Vacancies in the fiscal officership or on the board of trustees are filled by the remaining trustees.

== Public services ==
The Waynesfield-Goshen School District encompasses a large part of the township, with small portions in the northeast served by the Upper Scioto Valley Local School District.

The township is served by the Wapakoneta (45895) post office, the Waynesfield post office (45896) and the Lakeview (43331) post office. New Hampshire has its own zip code (45870).
