= Harrod, Ohio =

- Village
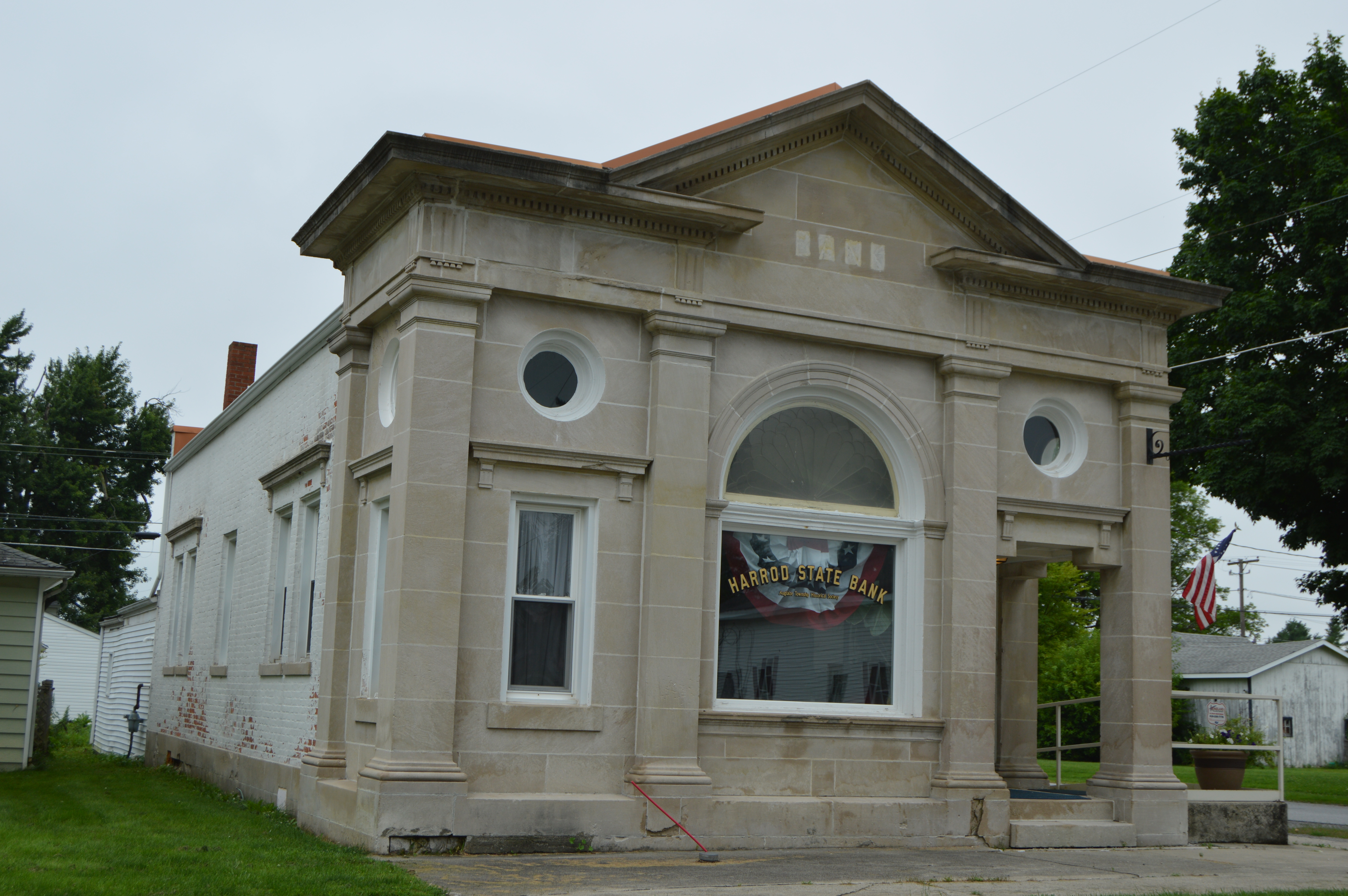
- Former Harrod State Bank, now a museum

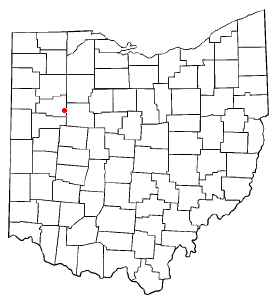
- Location of Harrod, Ohio

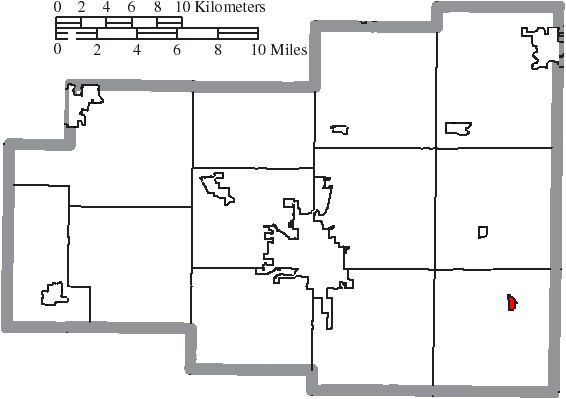
- Location of Harrod in Allen County
- Coordinates: 40°42′27″N 83°55′17″W
- Country: United States
- State: Ohio
- County: Allen
- Township: Auglaize

Government
  - Mayor: Tony Blake

Area
  - Total: 0.24 sq mi (0.61 km^{2})
  - Land: 0.24 sq mi (0.61 km^{2})
  - Water: 0 sq mi (0.00 km^{2})
- Elevation: 981 ft (299 m)

Population (2020)
  - Total: 423
  - Estimate (2023): 425
  - Density: 1,808.0/sq mi (698.06/km^{2})
- Time zone: UTC-5 (Eastern (EST))
  - Summer (DST): UTC-4 (EDT)
- ZIP code: 45850
- Area code: 419
- FIPS code: 39-34118
- GNIS feature ID: 2398256

Harrod is a village in Allen County, Ohio, United States. The population was 423 at the 2020 census. It is included in the Lima, Ohio Metropolitan Statistical Area.

== History ==
A post office called Harrod has been in operation since 1884. The village was named for the local Harrod family.

== Geography ==
According to the United States Census Bureau, the village has a total area of 0.24 square miles (0.62 km^{2}), all land.

== Demographics ==
Historical population
| Census | Pop. | Note | %± |
|---|---|---|---|
| 1890 | 269 | | — |
| 1900 | 370 | | 37.5% |
| 1910 | 474 | | 28.1% |
| 1920 | 389 | | −17.9% |
| 1930 | 421 | | 8.2% |
| 1940 | 422 | | 0.2% |
| 1950 | 482 | | 14.2% |
| 1960 | 563 | | 16.8% |
| 1970 | 533 | | −5.3% |
| 1980 | 506 | | −5.1% |
| 1990 | 537 | | 6.1% |
| 2000 | 491 | | −8.6% |
| 2010 | 417 | | −15.1% |
| 2020 | 423 | | 1.4% |
| 2023 (est.) | 425 | ▲ | 0.5% |
U.S. Decennial Census

=== 2010 census ===
As of the census of 2010, there were 417 people, 143 households, and 111 families living in the village. The population density was 1,737.5 inhabitants per square mile (670.9/km^{2}). There were 161 housing units at an average density of 670.8 per square mile (259.0/km^{2}). The racial makeup of the village was 99.3% White and 0.7% from two or more races. Hispanic or Latino of any race were 1.7% of the population.

There were 143 households, of which 46.9% had children under the age of 18 living with them, 60.1% were married couples living together, 11.9% had a female householder with no husband present, 5.6% had a male householder with no wife present, and 22.4% were non-families. 15.4% of all households were made up of individuals, and 4.9% had someone living alone who was 65 years of age or older. The average household size was 2.92 and the average family size was 3.26.

The median age in the village was 30.5 years. 29.7% of residents were under the age of 18; 9.2% were between the ages of 18 and 24; 28.5% were from 25 to 44; 23% were from 45 to 64; and 9.6% were 65 years of age or older. The gender makeup of the village was 49.4% male and 50.6% female.

=== 2000 census ===
As of the census of 2000, there were 491 people, 173 households, and 135 families living in the village. The population density was 2,193.1 inhabitants per square mile (846.8/km^{2}). There were 178 housing units at an average density of 795.1 per square mile (307.0/km^{2}). The racial makeup of the village was 98.37% White, 0.61% Native American, 0.41% from other races, and 0.61% from two or more races. Hispanic or Latino of any race were 1.63% of the population.

There were 173 households, out of which 44.5% had children under the age of 18 living with them, 64.7% were married couples living together, 8.7% had a female householder with no husband present, and 21.4% were non-families. 19.7% of all households were made up of individuals, and 6.4% had someone living alone who was 65 years of age or older. The average household size was 2.84 and the average family size was 3.24.

In the village, the population was spread out, with 31.6% under the age of 18, 8.6% from 18 to 24, 29.9% from 25 to 44, 21.0% from 45 to 64, and 9.0% who were 65 years of age or older. The median age was 32 years. For every 100 females there were 100.4 males. For every 100 females age 18 and over, there were 96.5 males.

The median income for a household in the village was $38,333, and the median income for a family was $43,611. Males had a median income of $31,369 versus $18,125 for females. The per capita income for the village was $15,422. About 4.8% of families and 7.0% of the population were below the poverty line, including 6.5% of those under age 18 and 10.5% of those age 65 or over.

== Notable people ==
- Louise Clapp, All-American Girls Professional Baseball League player
- Simeon D. Fess, Republican politician who served in the United States House of Representatives and U.S. Senate
- June Vincent, actress and singer
