= New Hampshire, Ohio =

- Census-designated place
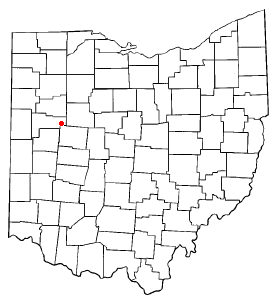
- Location of New Hampshire, Ohio
- Coordinates: 40°33′14″N 83°57′11″W
- Country: United States
- State: Ohio
- County: Auglaize
- Township: Goshen

Area
  - Total: 0.61 sq mi (1.6 km^{2})
  - Land: 0.61 sq mi (1.6 km^{2})
  - Water: 0 sq mi (0 km^{2})
- Elevation: 1,034 ft (315 m)

Population (2020)
  - Total: 150
  - Density: 250/sq mi (95/km^{2})
- Time zone: UTC-5 (Eastern (EST))
  - Summer (DST): UTC-4 (EDT)
- ZIP code: 45870
- Area code(s): 419 & 567
- FIPS code: 3954628
- GNIS feature ID: 2628940

New Hampshire is a census-designated place in central Goshen Township, Auglaize County, Ohio, United States. As of the 2020 census, it had a population of 150.

Located between Wapakoneta and Lakeview at the intersection of U.S. Route 33 with State Routes 196 and 385, the village maintains a small post office (Zip Code: 45870) and a country store.

== History ==
New Hampshire was laid out in 1836. The community was named after the state of New Hampshire. A post office called New Hampshire has been in operation since 1855.

== Geography ==
New Hampshire has a total area of 0.61 square miles (1.6 km^{2}), all land.

== Education ==
The community is served by the Waynesfield-Goshen Local School District.
