= Roundhead Township, Hardin County, Ohio =

Township in Ohio, US

- Township
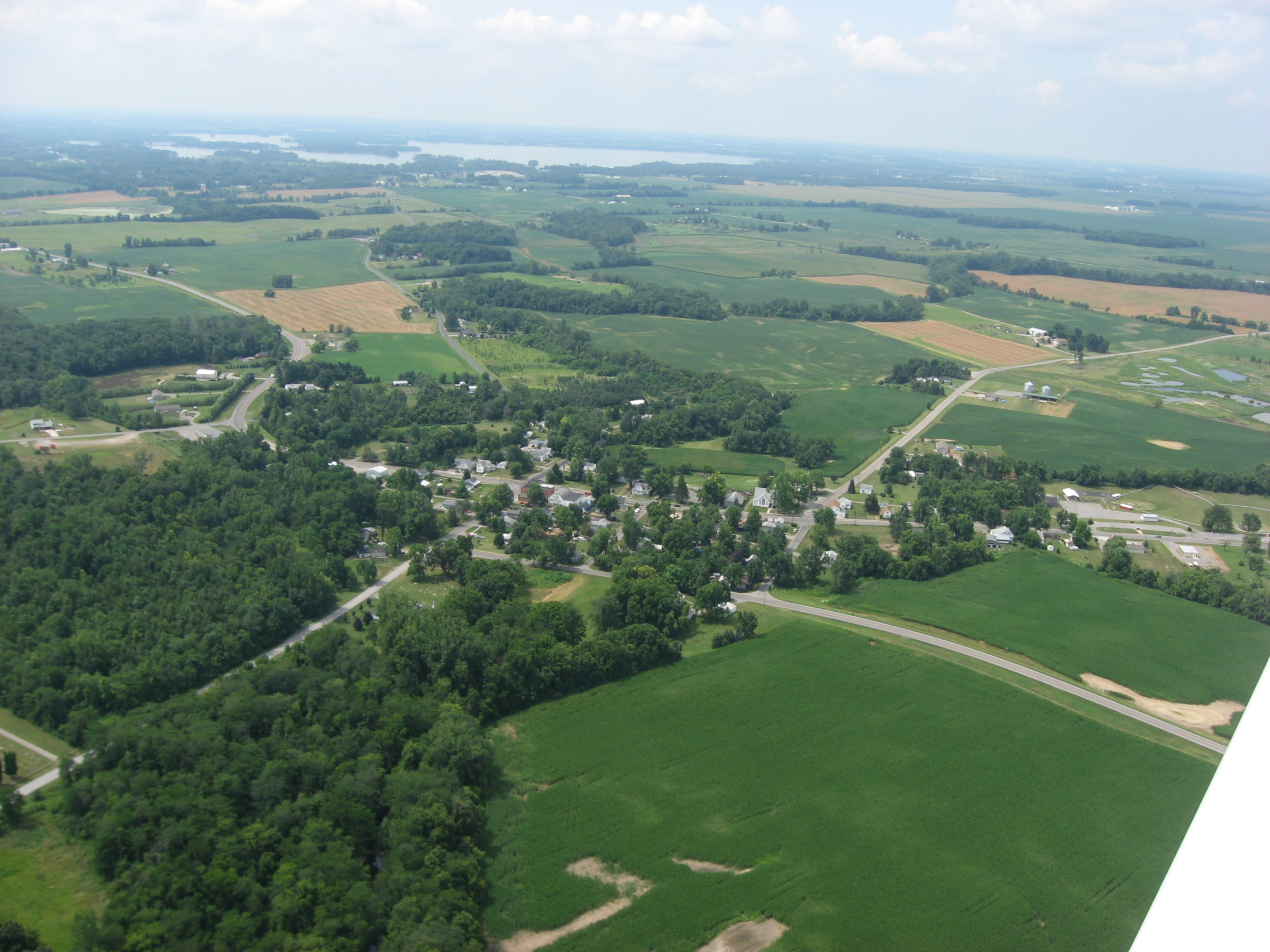
- Roundhead and surrounding countryside from the air

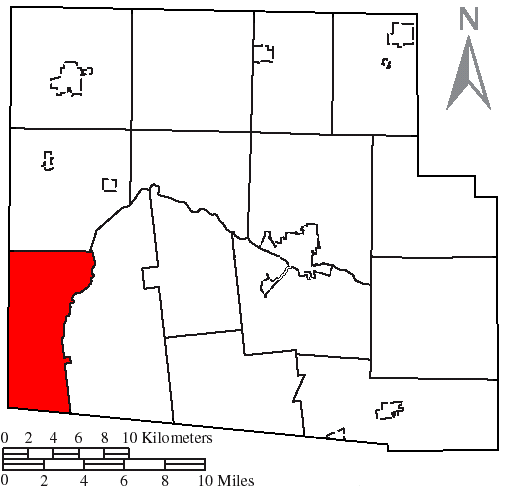
- Location of Roundhead Township, Hardin County, Ohio
- Coordinates: 40°34′57″N 83°50′55″W
- Country: United States
- State: Ohio
- County: Hardin

Area
  - Total: 25.9 sq mi (67.0 km^{2})
  - Land: 25.9 sq mi (67.0 km^{2})
  - Water: 0 sq mi (0.0 km^{2})
- Elevation: 1,030 ft (314 m)

Population (2020)
  - Total: 630
  - Density: 24/sq mi (9.4/km^{2})
- Time zone: UTC-5 (Eastern (EST))
  - Summer (DST): UTC-4 (EDT)
- ZIP code: 43346
- Area codes: 937, 326
- FIPS code: 39-68784
- GNIS feature ID: 1086268

Roundhead Township is one of the fifteen townships of Hardin County, Ohio, United States. As of the 2020 census the population was 630.

== Geography ==
Located in the southwestern corner of the county, it borders the following townships:

- Marion Township - north
- McDonald Township - east
- Richland Township, Logan County - southeast
- Stokes Township, Logan County - southwest
- Goshen Township, Auglaize County - west, south of Wayne Township
- Wayne Township, Auglaize County - west, north of Goshen Township
- Auglaize Township, Allen County - northwest corner

No municipalities are located in Roundhead Township, although the unincorporated community of Roundhead lies in the township's southeast.

== Name and history ==
Roundhead Township was organized in 1832. The township is named for Wyandot chief Roundhead, who inhabited the area in the early 19th century.

== Government ==
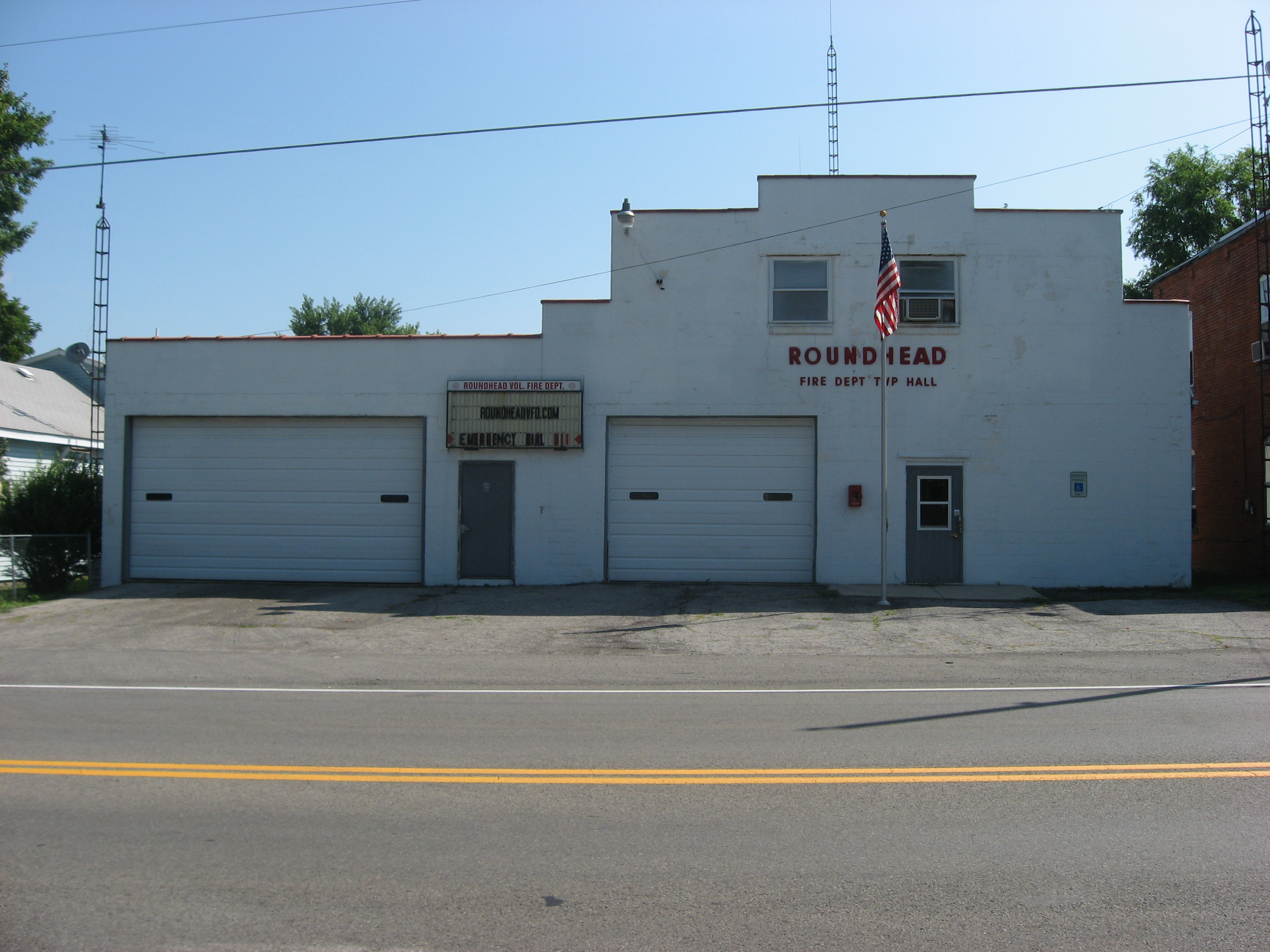
Roundhead Township Hall and fire department

The township is governed by a three-member board of trustees, who are elected in November of odd-numbered years to a four-year term beginning on the following January 1. Two are elected in the year after the presidential election and one is elected in the year before it. There is also an elected township fiscal officer, who serves a four-year term beginning on April 1 of the year after the election, which is held in November of the year before the presidential election. Vacancies in the fiscal officership or on the board of trustees are filled by the remaining trustees.
