= Ohio State Route 701 =

State highway in Hardin County, Ohio, US

State Route 701

Route information
- Maintained by ODOT
- Length: 8.96 mi (14.42 km)
- Existed: 1937–present

Major junctions
- West end: SR 309 near Ada
- East end: US 68 near Dunkirk

Location
- Country: United States
- State: Ohio
- Counties: Hardin

Highway system
- Ohio State Highway System; Interstate; US; State; Scenic
← SR 700	→ SR 702

State Route 701 (SR 701, OH 701) is a 8.96-mile (14.42 km) east–west state highway in western Ohio, a U.S. state. The state highway's western terminus is at a T-intersection with SR 309 nearly 3 miles (4.8 km) southeast of Ada. The eastern terminus of State Route 701 is at U.S. Route 68 (US 68) approximately 3.50 miles (5.63 km) southeast of Dunkirk.

Established in the late 1930s, SR 701 is a two-lane route that serves as an eastward continuation of SR 309, which runs due east out of Lima. SR 701 picks up along the same east–west alignment when SR 309 turns southeasterly in the direction of Kenton.

== Route description ==
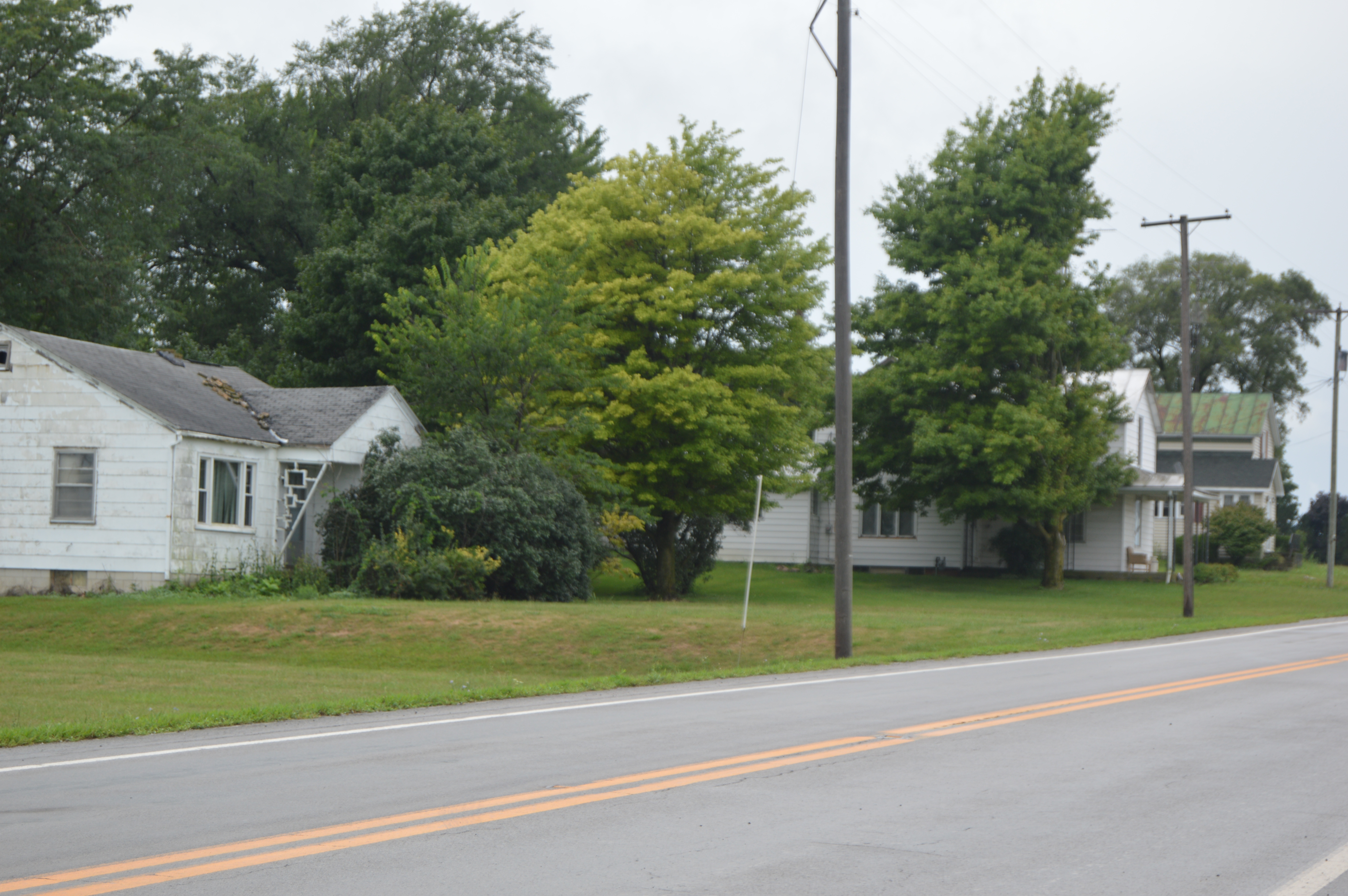
Houses at Blanchard

The entirety of SR 701 runs within rural territory in the northern half of Hardin County. It begins at a T-intersection with SR 309 in the extreme northern portion of Marion Township. The highway runs northeast a short distance before turning due east onto the boundary between Marion and Liberty Townships. For its entire distance, SR 701 passes through vast farmland. In addition, small patches of woods and a number of houses appear along the highway as well. SR 701 intersects County Road 65 (CR 65) and then CR 75, at which point it becomes the border between Cessna and Washington Townships. As it straddles the boundary between these two townships, SR 701 successively intersects Township Road 85 (TR 85) and TR 87, followed by split intersections with CR 95, TR 105, CR 115 and TR 125. Upon intersecting CR 135, SR 701 becomes the separation between Pleasant and Blanchard Townships. The highway crosses a CSX railway line, after which it meets TR 145 prior to arriving at its endpoint at US 68. Continuing to the east of US 68 following the end of SR 701 is CR 70.

Maintenance of SR 701 falls under the jurisdiction of the Ohio Department of Transportation (ODOT). As a part of its responsibilities maintaining this highway, ODOT conducts surveys to identify the amount of traffic using this and other routes throughout the state highway system. This measurement of traffic volume is known as the average annual daily traffic (AADT). The AADT identifies the amount of traffic using a particular stretch of highway on any average day of the year. As determined in a 2010 survey by ODOT, an average of 430 passenger vehicles and 90 commercial vehicles travel the length of SR 701 on a daily basis. SR 701 is not included within the National Highway System (NHS). The NHS is a network of routes that are determined to be most important for the economy, mobility and defense of the nation.

== History ==
The SR 701 designation was applied in 1937. Throughout its history, SR 701 has utilized the same alignment through in the northern half of Hardin County. It has been paved since it was first established. The only change to have taken place related to SR 701 is that the route that it met at its western terminus when first designated was the predecessor to SR 309, US 30S.

== Major intersections ==
The entire route is in Hardin County.

Location	mi	km	Destinations	Notes
Marion Township	0.00	0.00	SR 309	Western terminus at T-intersection
Pleasant–Blanchard township line	8.96	14.42	US 68	Eastern terminus
1.000 mi = 1.609 km; 1.000 km = 0.621 mi
