= Blanchard, Ohio =

Unincorporated community in Ohio, U.S.

Coordinates: 40°43′55″N 83°38′37″W

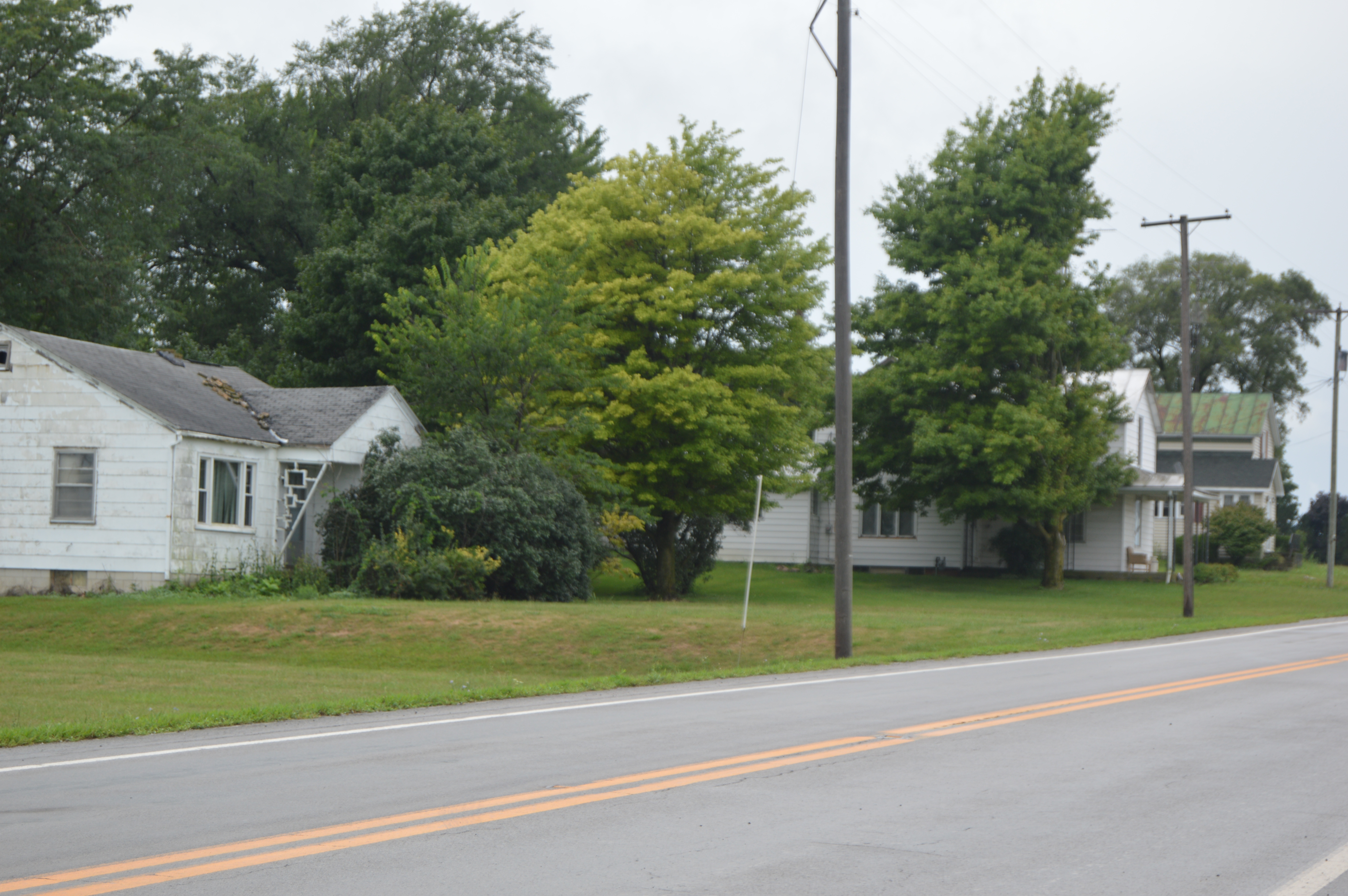
Houses on State Route 701

Blanchard is an unincorporated community in Hardin County, in the U.S. state of Ohio.

== History ==
Blanchard was founded in 1892 when the railroad was extended to that point. The community lies within Blanchard Township, which was named for the Blanchard River. A post office was established at Blanchard in 1894, and remained in operation until 1911.
