= Pleasant Township, Ohio =

Pleasant Township, Ohio may refer to:

- Pleasant Township, Brown County, Ohio
- Pleasant Township, Clark County, Ohio
- Pleasant Township, Fairfield County, Ohio
- Pleasant Township, Franklin County, Ohio
- Pleasant Township, Hancock County, Ohio
- Pleasant Township, Hardin County, Ohio
- Pleasant Township, Henry County, Ohio
- Pleasant Township, Knox County, Ohio
- Pleasant Township, Logan County, Ohio
- Pleasant Township, Madison County, Ohio
- Pleasant Township, Marion County, Ohio
- Pleasant Township, Perry County, Ohio
- Pleasant Township, Putnam County, Ohio
- Pleasant Township, Seneca County, Ohio
- Pleasant Township, Van Wert County, Ohio

== See also ==
- Pleasant Township (disambiguation)
