= Pleasant Township, Indiana =

Pleasant Township, Indiana may refer to one of the following places:

- Pleasant Township, Allen County, Indiana
- Pleasant Township, Grant County, Indiana
- Pleasant Township, Johnson County, Indiana
- Pleasant Township, LaPorte County, Indiana
- Pleasant Township, Porter County, Indiana
- Pleasant Township, Steuben County, Indiana
- Pleasant Township, Switzerland County, Indiana
- Pleasant Township, Wabash County, Indiana

There is also: Mount Pleasant Township, Delaware County, Indiana

== See also ==
- Pleasant Township (disambiguation)
