= James H. Miller =

James H. Miller may be:

- James Hughes Miller (1843-1890), Illinois politician
- Jim Miller (American football coach) (1920-2006)
