= Lake Central Airlines Flight 527 =

1967 aviation accident

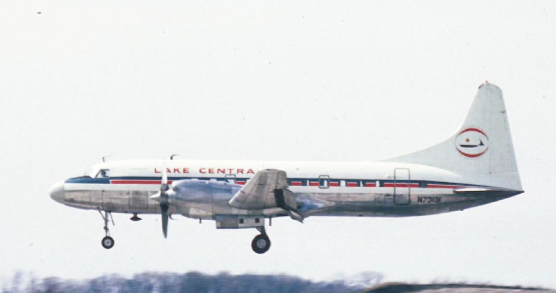
- A Convair 580 similar to the accident aircraft. This aircraft crashed while operating with Air Tahoma in 2004.

Accident
- Date: March 5, 1967
- Summary: Loss of control and aircraft break-up after catastrophic propeller failure
- Site: During descent to Toledo Express Airport, near Marseilles Township, Wyandot County, Ohio; 40°41′37″N 83°25′51″W

Aircraft
- Aircraft type: Convair 580
- Operator: Lake Central Airlines
- Registration: N73130
- Flight origin: Chicago O'Hare International Airport
- 1st stopover: Lafayette (IN) Airport
- 2nd stopover: Greater Cincinnati Airport
- 3rd stopover: Port Columbus International Airport
- 4th stopover: Toledo Express Airport
- Destination: Detroit Metropolitan Wayne County Airport
- Passengers: 35
- Crew: 3
- Fatalities: 38
- Survivors: 0

Lake Central Airlines Flight 527 was a regularly scheduled Convair 580 flight on March 5, 1967, from Chicago, Illinois to Detroit, Michigan with stops at Lafayette, Indiana, Cincinnati, Ohio, Columbus, Ohio and Toledo, Ohio. The aircraft crashed near Marseilles, Ohio, killing all 38 passengers and crew on board. This remains the deadliest aviation accident in the state of Ohio.

== Synopsis ==
On March 5, 1967, Lake Central Airlines Flight 527 was scheduled from Chicago, Illinois to Detroit, Michigan. The flight, operated by one of the company's Convair 580 aircraft and flown by captain John W. Horn (45) and first officer Roger P. Skillman (33), left Chicago at 4:04 p.m. CST and proceeded normally to Lafayette, Cincinnati and Columbus. No problems were reported.

The aircraft was serviced in Columbus and departed at 7:52 p.m. EST for Toledo. At 8:05 p.m., the flight was cleared by air traffic control to descend from 10,000 to 6,000 feet (3,000 to 1,800 m) as it approached Toledo. Air traffic control requested that the flight report its descent and to report crossing 8,000 and 7,000 feet (2,400 and 2,100 m). The crew acknowledged leaving 10,000 feet. This was the last transmission from the aircraft.

Witnesses in the vicinity of Marseilles, Ohio reported hearing sounds from an aircraft at times between 8:05 and 8:10 p.m. Some reported sounds similar to that of an engine starting. Shortly thereafter, the sound of an explosion was reported.

By 9:00 p.m., the authorities had confirmed that an aircraft had crashed in the area. Rain mixed with snow was reported at the time of the accident.

== Cause ==
The aircraft was found to be loaded within normal limits, and the crew was found to be properly qualified for the flight, with no deficiencies reported.

The aircraft was equipped with a flight data recorder, which sustained no damage in the crash and was successfully read by investigators. Approximately 14 minutes after departing Columbus, the aircraft was on a heading of 322 degrees when it abruptly veered right 40 degrees, and then left 55 degrees, before power to the recorder was abruptly terminated. The cockpit voice recorder lost power at the same time, although investigators heard a sound resembling "the first few seconds of an air raid siren" just before shutoff.

The aircraft crashed in a farm field on a heading of 360 degrees. The front fuselage was separated from the main part of the aircraft, and debris was recovered from a 1.5-mile-long (2.4 km), 0.5-mile-wide (0.80 km) trail on a heading of 135 degrees from the main wreckage. The right propeller was completely detached from the engine, as were the blades. In reconstructing the wreckage, the investigators discovered that the right propeller had separated during flight and severed the fuselage.

During manufacture, propeller pistons, which control the pitch of the propellers, are coated through a process called nitriding, which hardens them and increases their resistance to surface wear. They are supposed to be inspected to ensure that the process is completed, but investigators could not determine why N73130's propeller was not nitrided and did not fail inspections. During the life of the engine, the piston had been slowly wearing away. During the flight, the piston finally failed, causing the propeller to speed beyond its limits. The stress caused the propeller to fail one to two seconds later. When the propeller failed, the blades were hurled through the cabin, severing control cables and compromising the plane's structural integrity. The investigators determined that the crash was caused solely by the propeller defect and subsequent failure.
