= Goshen Township =

Goshen Township may refer to:

== Arkansas ==
- Goshen Township, Washington County, Arkansas

== Illinois ==
- Goshen Township, Stark County, Illinois

== Iowa ==
- Goshen Township, Muscatine County, Iowa

== Kansas ==
- Goshen Township, Clay County, Kansas

== Ohio ==
- Goshen Township, Auglaize County, Ohio
- Goshen Township, Belmont County, Ohio
- Goshen Township, Champaign County, Ohio
- Goshen Township, Clermont County, Ohio
- Goshen Township, Hardin County, Ohio
- Goshen Township, Mahoning County, Ohio
- Goshen Township, Tuscarawas County, Ohio

== Pennsylvania ==
- Goshen Township, Clearfield County, Pennsylvania

== See also ==
- West Goshen Township, Pennsylvania
- East Goshen Township, Chester County, Pennsylvania
