= Jackson Township, Ohio =

Jackson Township, Ohio, may refer to:

- Jackson Township, Allen County, Ohio
- Jackson Township, Ashland County, Ohio
- Jackson Township, Auglaize County, Ohio
- Jackson Township, Brown County, Ohio
- Jackson Township, Champaign County, Ohio
- Jackson Township, Clermont County, Ohio
- Jackson Township, Coshocton County, Ohio
- Jackson Township, Crawford County, Ohio
- Jackson Township, Darke County, Ohio
- Jackson Township, Franklin County, Ohio
- Jackson Township, Guernsey County, Ohio
- Jackson Township, Hancock County, Ohio
- Jackson Township, Hardin County, Ohio
- Jackson Township, Highland County, Ohio
- Jackson Township, Jackson County, Ohio
- Jackson Township, Knox County, Ohio
- Jackson Township, Mahoning County, Ohio
- Jackson Township, Monroe County, Ohio
- Jackson Township, Montgomery County, Ohio
- Jackson Township, Muskingum County, Ohio
- Jackson Township, Noble County, Ohio
- Jackson Township, Paulding County, Ohio
- Jackson Township, Perry County, Ohio
- Jackson Township, Pickaway County, Ohio
- Jackson Township, Pike County, Ohio
- Jackson Township, Preble County, Ohio
- Jackson Township, Putnam County, Ohio
- Jackson Township, Richland County, Ohio
- Jackson Township, Sandusky County, Ohio
- Jackson Township, Seneca County, Ohio
- Jackson Township, Shelby County, Ohio
- Jackson Township, Stark County, Ohio
- Jackson Township, Union County, Ohio
- Jackson Township, Van Wert County, Ohio
- Jackson Township, Vinton County, Ohio
- Jackson Township, Wood County, Ohio
- Jackson Township, Wyandot County, Ohio
