= Buck Township, Ohio =

Township in Ohio, US

Buck Township, Hardin County, Ohio
- Township
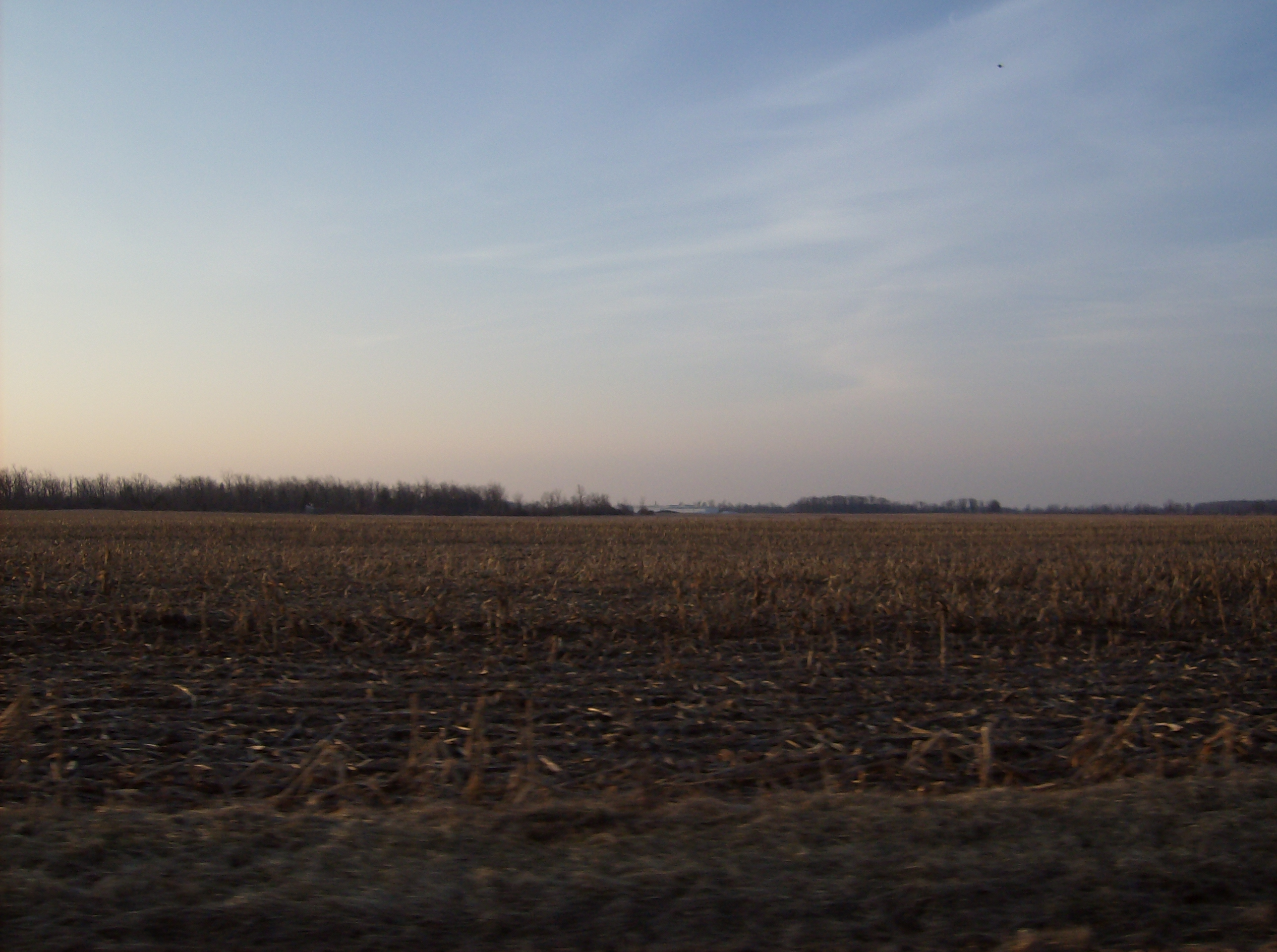
- Buck Township includes wide farmlands.

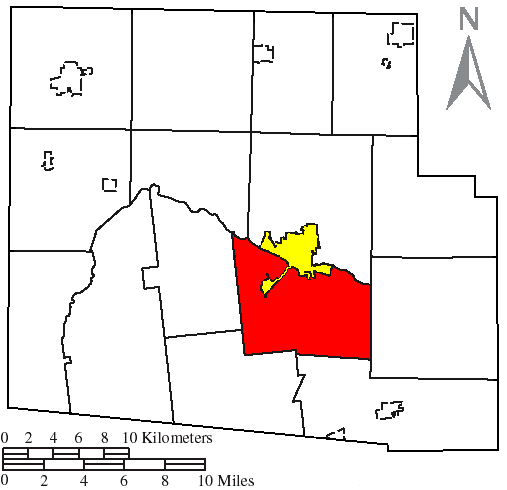
- Location of Buck Township (red), next to the city of Kenton (yellow)
- Coordinates: 40°37′45″N 83°36′27″W
- Country: United States
- State: Ohio
- County: Hardin

Area
  - Total: 30.7 sq mi (79.4 km^{2})
  - Land: 30.5 sq mi (79.1 km^{2})
  - Water: 0.12 sq mi (0.3 km^{2})
- Elevation: 981 ft (299 m)

Population (2020)
  - Total: 2,391
  - Density: 78.3/sq mi (30.2/km^{2})
- Time zone: UTC-5 (Eastern (EST))
  - Summer (DST): UTC-4 (EDT)
- FIPS code: 39-09848
- GNIS feature ID: 1086257

Buck Township is one of the fifteen townships of Hardin County, Ohio, United States. As of the 2020 census the population was 2,391.

== Geography ==
Located in the southern center of the county, it borders the following townships:

- Pleasant Township - north
- Dudley Township - east
- Hale Township - southeast
- Taylor Creek Township - southwest
- Lynn Township - west
- Cessna Township - northwest

Part of the city of Kenton, the county seat of Hardin County, is located in northern Buck Township.

== Name and history ==
Buck Township most likely was organized in 1845. This township derives its name from Harvey Buckminster, a pioneer settler. It is the only Buck Township statewide, although there is a Bucks Township in Tuscarawas County.

== Government ==
The township is governed by a three-member board of trustees, who are elected in November of odd-numbered years to a four-year term beginning on the following January 1. Two are elected in the year after the presidential election and one is elected in the year before it. There is also an elected township fiscal officer, who serves a four-year term beginning on April 1 of the year after the election, which is held in November of the year before the presidential election. Vacancies in the fiscal officership or on the board of trustees are filled by the remaining trustees.
