= Goshen Township, Hardin County, Ohio =

Township in Ohio, US

- Township
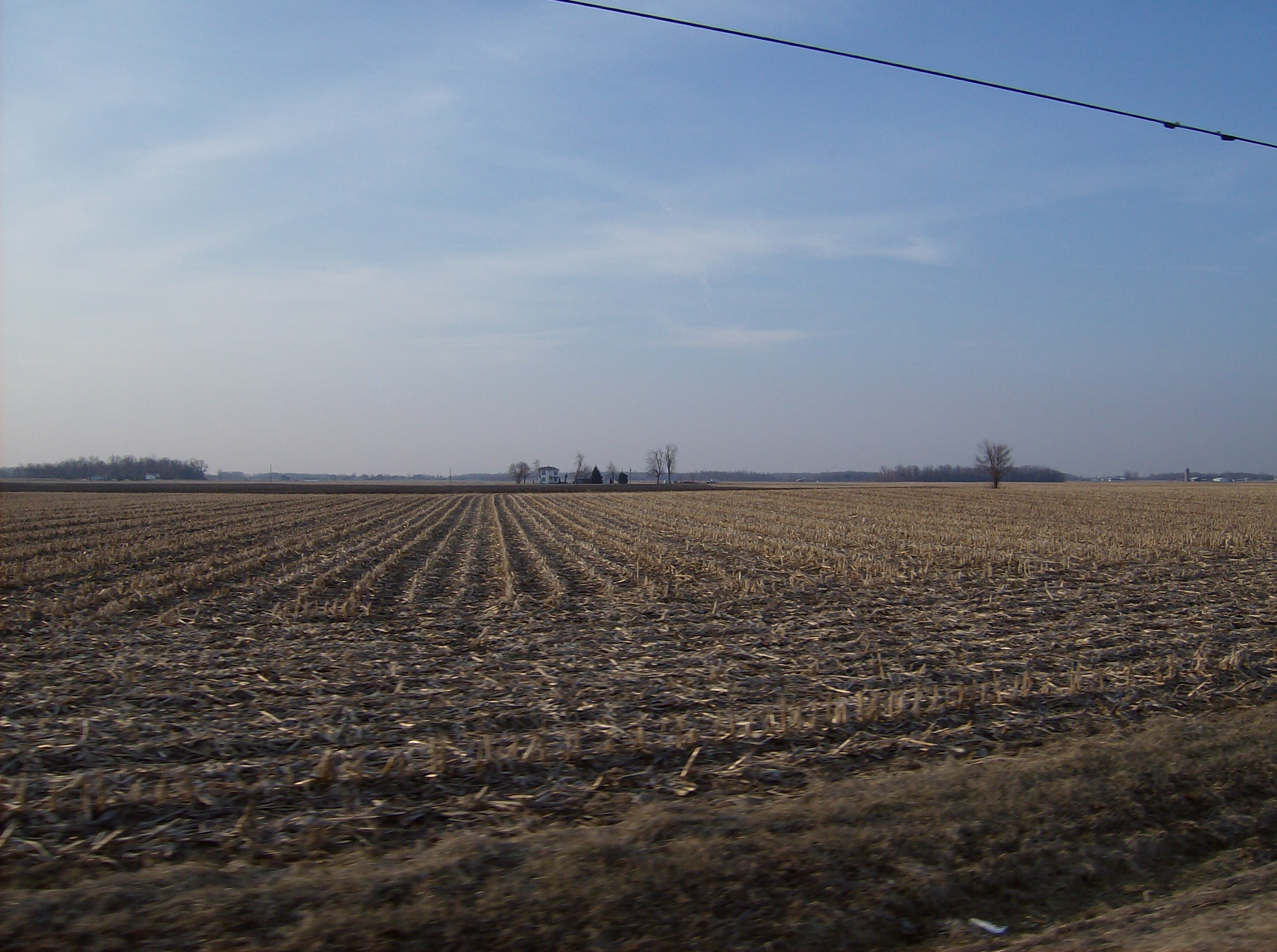
- Goshen Township includes wide areas of flat farmland.

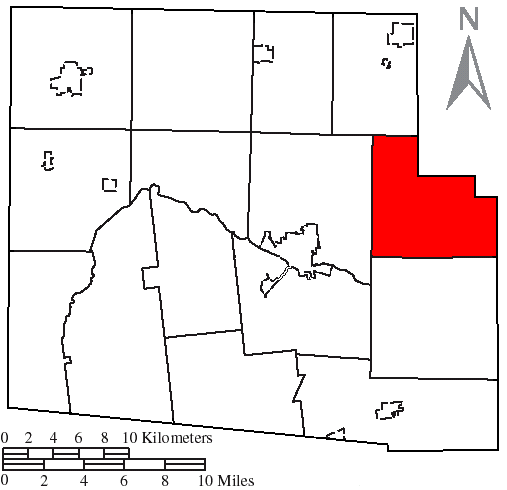
- Location of Goshen Township, Hardin County, Ohio
- Coordinates: 40°40′46″N 83°29′13″W
- Country: United States
- State: Ohio
- County: Hardin

Area
  - Total: 28.4 sq mi (73.5 km^{2})
  - Land: 28.4 sq mi (73.5 km^{2})
  - Water: 0 sq mi (0.0 km^{2})
- Elevation: 935 ft (285 m)

Population (2020)
  - Total: 529
  - Density: 18.6/sq mi (7.20/km^{2})
- Time zone: UTC-5 (Eastern (EST))
  - Summer (DST): UTC-4 (EDT)
- FIPS code: 39-31024
- GNIS feature ID: 1086260
- Website: https://www.goshentwpoh.org/

Goshen Township is one of the fifteen townships of Hardin County, Ohio, United States. As of the 2020 census the population was 529.

== Geography ==
Located in the northeastern part of the county, it borders the following townships:

- Jackson Township, Wyandot County - north
- Marseilles Township, Wyandot County - northeast
- Grand Township, Marion County - east
- Montgomery Township, Marion County - southeast corner
- Dudley Township - south
- Pleasant Township - west
- Jackson Township - northwest

No municipalities are located in Goshen Township.

== Name and history ==
Goshen Township was organized in 1834. This township derives its name from the biblical Land of Goshen. It is one of seven Goshen Townships statewide.

== Government ==
The township is governed by a three-member board of trustees, who are elected in November of odd-numbered years to a four-year term beginning on the following January 1. Two are elected in the year after the presidential election and one is elected in the year before it. There is also an elected township fiscal officer, who serves a four-year term beginning on April 1 of the year after the election, which is held in November of the year before the presidential election. Vacancies in the fiscal officership or on the board of trustees are filled by the remaining trustees.
