= Kirby, Ohio =

- Village
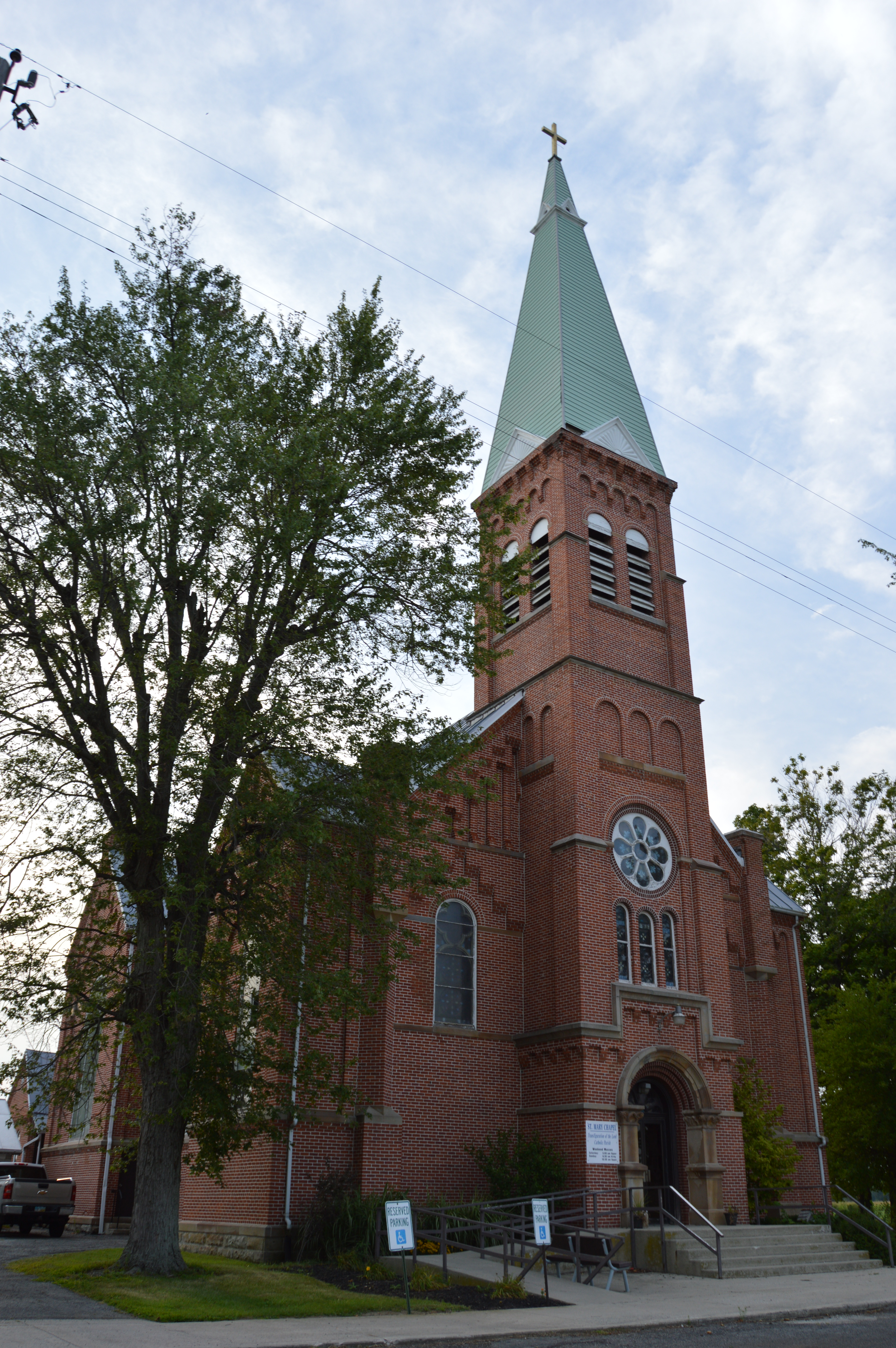
- St. Mary's Catholic Church

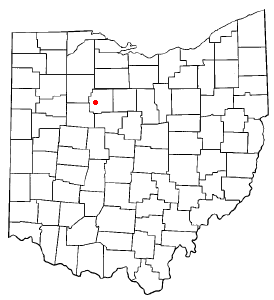
- Location of Kirby, Ohio

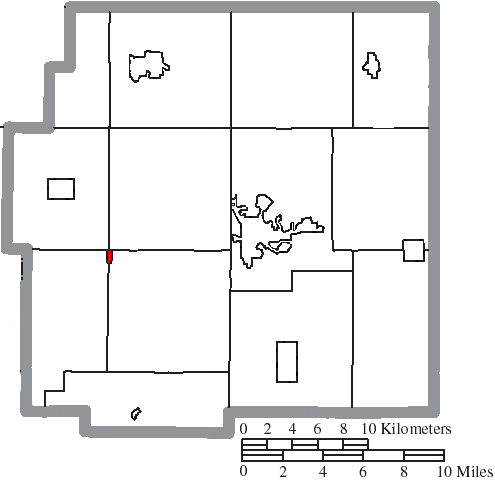
- Location of Kirby in Wyandot County
- Coordinates: 40°48′49″N 83°25′10″W
- Country: United States
- State: Ohio
- County: Wyandot
- Township: Jackson, Mifflin

Area
  - Total: 0.11 sq mi (0.28 km^{2})
  - Land: 0.11 sq mi (0.28 km^{2})
  - Water: 0 sq mi (0.00 km^{2})
- Elevation: 873 ft (266 m)

Population (2020)
  - Total: 120
  - Density: 1,113.6/sq mi (429.97/km^{2})
- Time zone: UTC-5 (Eastern (EST))
  - Summer (DST): UTC-4 (EDT)
- ZIP code: 43330
- Area code: 419
- FIPS code: 39-40558
- GNIS feature ID: 2398358

Kirby is a village in Wyandot County, Ohio, United States. The population was 120 at the 2020 census.

== History ==
Kirby was laid out and named for M. H. Kirby, in 1854. A post office was established at Kirby in 1854, and remains open.

== Geography ==
According to the United States Census Bureau, the village has a total area of 0.11 square miles (0.28 km^{2}), all land.

== Demographics ==
Historical population
Census	Pop.	Note	%±
1880	294		—
1900	187		—
1910	136		−27.3%
1920	196		44.1%
1930	128		−34.7%
1940	137		7.0%
1950	164		19.7%
1960	166		1.2%
1970	178		7.2%
1980	158		−11.2%
1990	155		−1.9%
2000	132		−14.8%
2010	118		−10.6%
2020	120		1.7%
U.S. Decennial Census

=== 2010 census ===
As of the census of 2010, there were 118 people, 50 households, and 29 families living in the village. The population density was 1,072.7 inhabitants per square mile (414.2/km^{2}). There were 56 housing units at an average density of 509.1 per square mile (196.6/km^{2}). The racial makeup of the village was 99.2% White and 0.8% from two or more races.

There were 50 households, of which 26.0% had children under the age of 18 living with them, 40.0% were married couples living together, 10.0% had a female householder with no husband present, 8.0% had a male householder with no wife present, and 42.0% were non-families. 28.0% of all households were made up of individuals, and 8% had someone living alone who was 65 years of age or older. The average household size was 2.36 and the average family size was 2.90.

The median age in the village was 32.5 years. 20.3% of residents were under the age of 18; 16.9% were between the ages of 18 and 24; 27.1% were from 25 to 44; 24.5% were from 45 to 64; and 11% were 65 years of age or older. The gender makeup of the village was 60.2% male and 39.8% female.

=== 2000 census ===
As of the census of 2000, there were 132 people, 52 households, and 37 families living in the village. The population density was 1,232.4 inhabitants per square mile (475.8/km^{2}). There were 59 housing units at an average density of 550.8 per square mile (212.7/km^{2}). The racial makeup of the village was 100.00% White.

There were 52 households, out of which 34.6% had children under the age of 18 living with them, 53.8% were married couples living together, 9.6% had a female householder with no husband present, and 28.8% were non-families. 26.9% of all households were made up of individuals, and 13.5% had someone living alone who was 65 years of age or older. The average household size was 2.54 and the average family size was 3.03.

In the village, the population was spread out, with 25.8% under the age of 18, 12.1% from 18 to 24, 33.3% from 25 to 44, 15.2% from 45 to 64, and 13.6% who were 65 years of age or older. The median age was 37 years. For every 100 females there were 100.0 males. For every 100 females age 18 and over, there were 100.0 males.

The median income for a household in the village was $33,333, and the median income for a family was $51,094. Males had a median income of $33,333 versus $25,833 for females. The per capita income for the village was $19,997. There were 6.5% of families and 9.0% of the population living below the poverty line, including no under eighteens and none of those over 64.
