= Jackson Township, Wyandot County, Ohio =

Township in Ohio, US

- Township
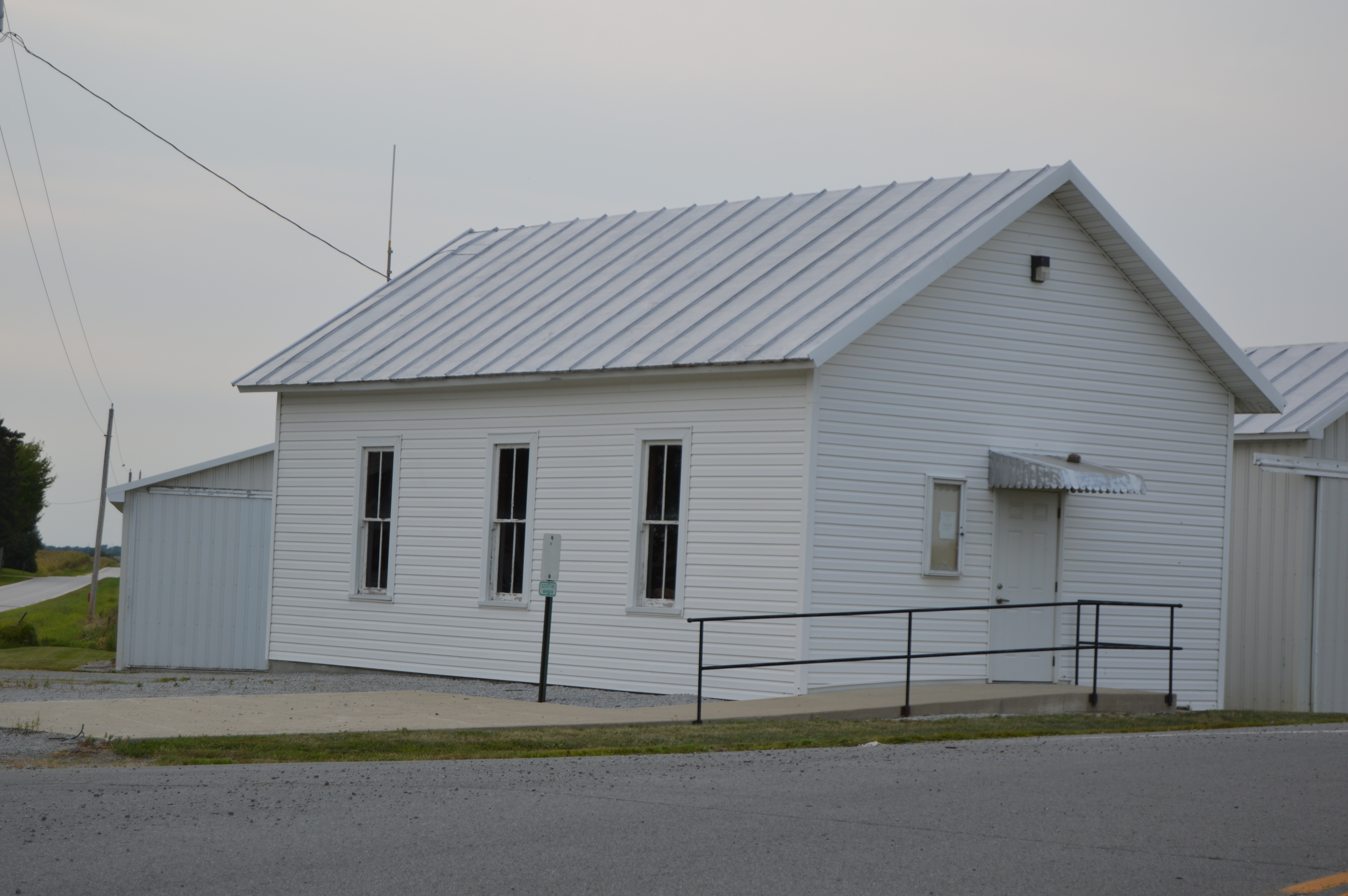
- Township hall on State Route 37

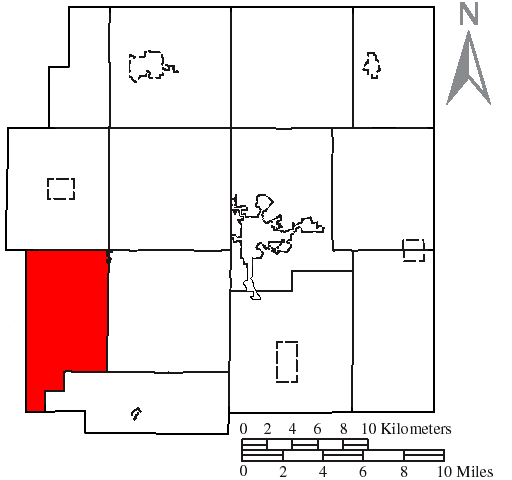
- Location of Jackson Township in Wyandot County
- Coordinates: 40°45′39″N 83°27′16″W
- Country: United States
- State: Ohio
- County: Wyandot

Area
  - Total: 27.1 sq mi (70.2 km^{2})
  - Land: 27.1 sq mi (70.2 km^{2})
  - Water: 0 sq mi (0.0 km^{2})
- Elevation: 902 ft (275 m)

Population (2020)
  - Total: 596
  - Density: 22.0/sq mi (8.49/km^{2})
- Time zone: UTC-5 (Eastern (EST))
  - Summer (DST): UTC-4 (EDT)
- FIPS code: 39-38178
- GNIS feature ID: 1087206

Jackson Township is one of the thirteen townships of Wyandot County, Ohio, United States. The 2020 census found 596 people in the township.

== Geography ==
Located in the southwestern corner of the county, it borders the following townships:

- Richland Township - north
- Salem Township - northeast corner
- Mifflin Township - east
- Marseilles Township - southeast
- Goshen Township, Hardin County - southwest
- Jackson Township, Hardin County - west

Part of the village of Kirby is located in northeastern Jackson Township.

== Name and history ==
It is one of thirty-seven Jackson Townships statewide.

== Government ==
The township is governed by a three-member board of trustees, who are elected in November of odd-numbered years to a four-year term beginning on the following January 1. Two are elected in the year after the presidential election and one is elected in the year before it. There is also an elected township fiscal officer, who serves a four-year term beginning on April 1 of the year after the election, which is held in November of the year before the presidential election. Vacancies in the fiscal officership or on the board of trustees are filled by the remaining trustees.
