= Lynn Township, Hardin County, Ohio =

Township in Ohio, US

- Township
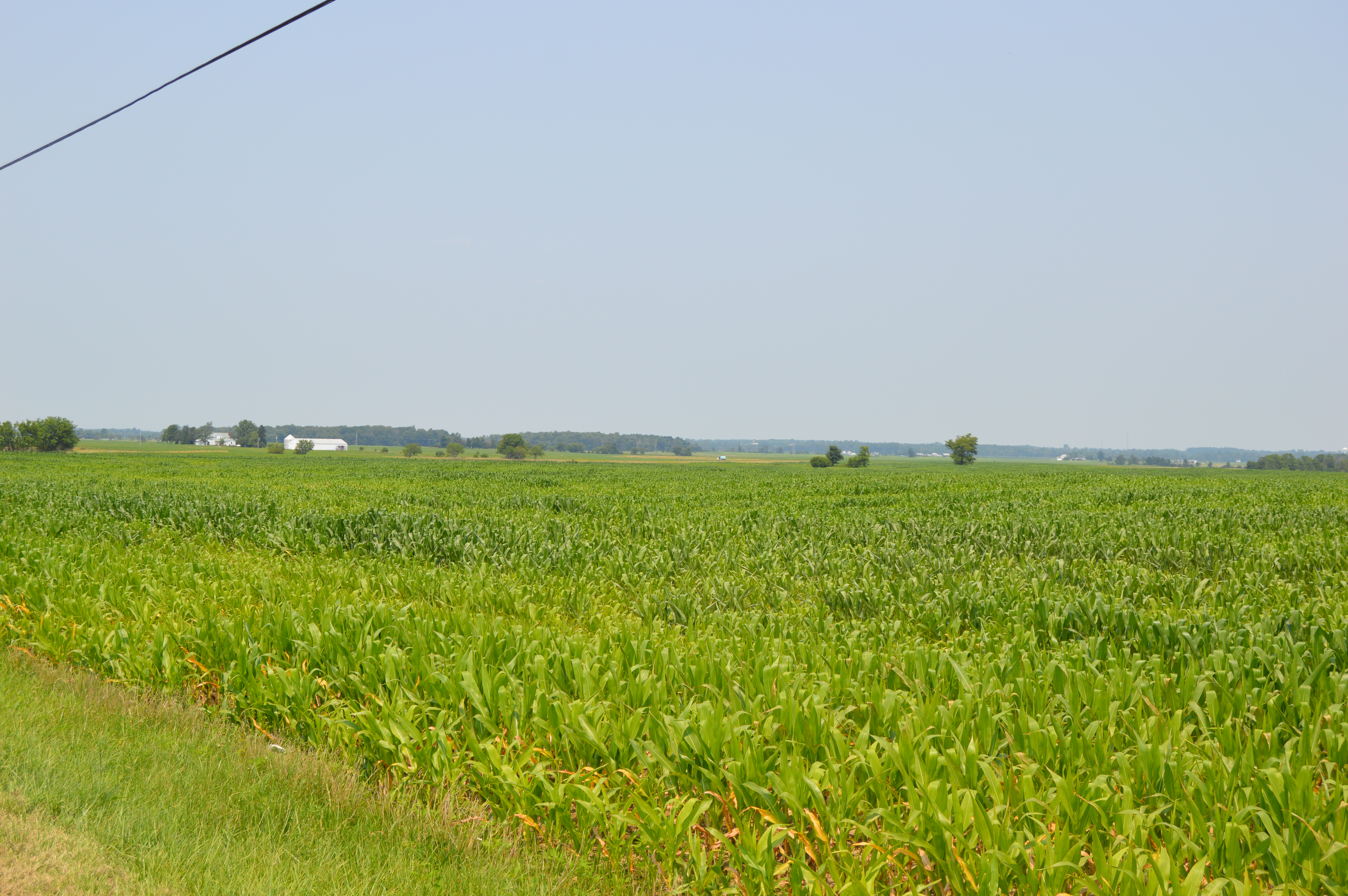
- Cornfield in the township's southeast

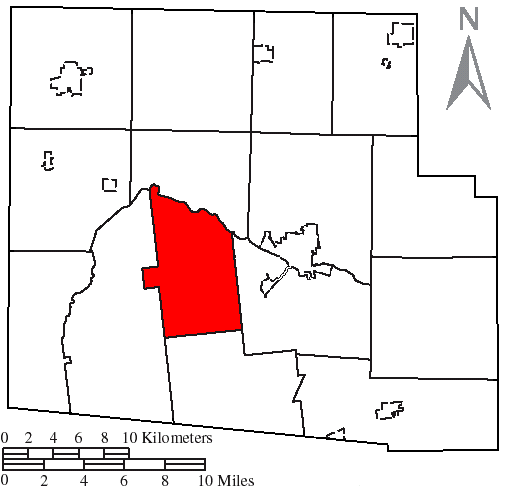
- Location of Lynn Township, Hardin County, Ohio
- Coordinates: 40°38′35″N 83°43′35″W
- Country: United States
- State: Ohio
- County: Hardin

Area
  - Total: 25.06 sq mi (64.91 km^{2})
  - Land: 25.06 sq mi (64.90 km^{2})
  - Water: 0.0077 sq mi (0.02 km^{2})
- Elevation: 994 ft (303 m)

Population (2020)
  - Total: 591
  - Density: 23.6/sq mi (9.11/km^{2})
- Time zone: UTC-5 (Eastern (EST))
  - Summer (DST): UTC-4 (EDT)
- FIPS code: 39-45598
- GNIS feature ID: 1086264

Lynn Township is one of the fifteen townships of Hardin County, Ohio, United States. As of the 2020 census the population was 591.

== Geography ==
Located in the southern center of the county, it borders the following townships:

- Cessna Township - north
- Buck Township - east
- Taylor Creek Township - south
- McDonald Township - west

No municipalities are located in Lynn Township.

== Name and history ==
Lynn Township was established in 1857. The township's name most likely comes from the linden trees which were once abundant there, although a share of the pioneer settlers had the last name Lynn. It is the only Lynn Township statewide. According to his obituary, Sgt John Wesley Flinn (1823–1901) built the first cabin after the township was organized in 1859.

== Government ==
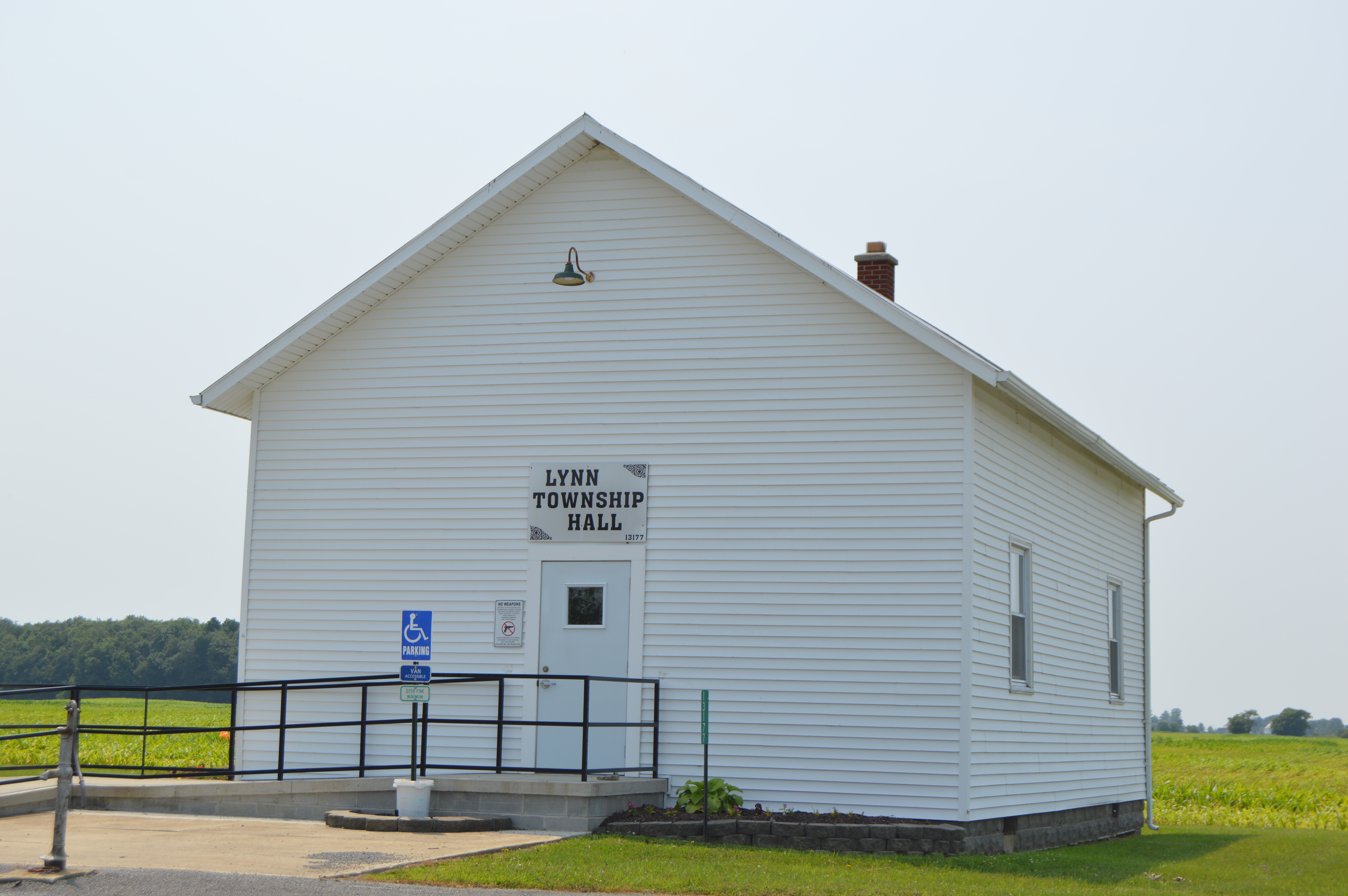
Township hall

The township is governed by a three-member board of trustees, who are elected in November of odd-numbered years to a four-year term beginning on the following January 1. Two are elected in the year after the presidential election and one is elected in the year before it. There is also an elected township fiscal officer, who serves a four-year term beginning on April 1 of the year after the election, which is held in November of the year before the presidential election. Vacancies in the fiscal officership or on the board of trustees are filled by the remaining trustees.
