= McDonald Township, Hardin County, Ohio =

Township in Ohio, US

- Township
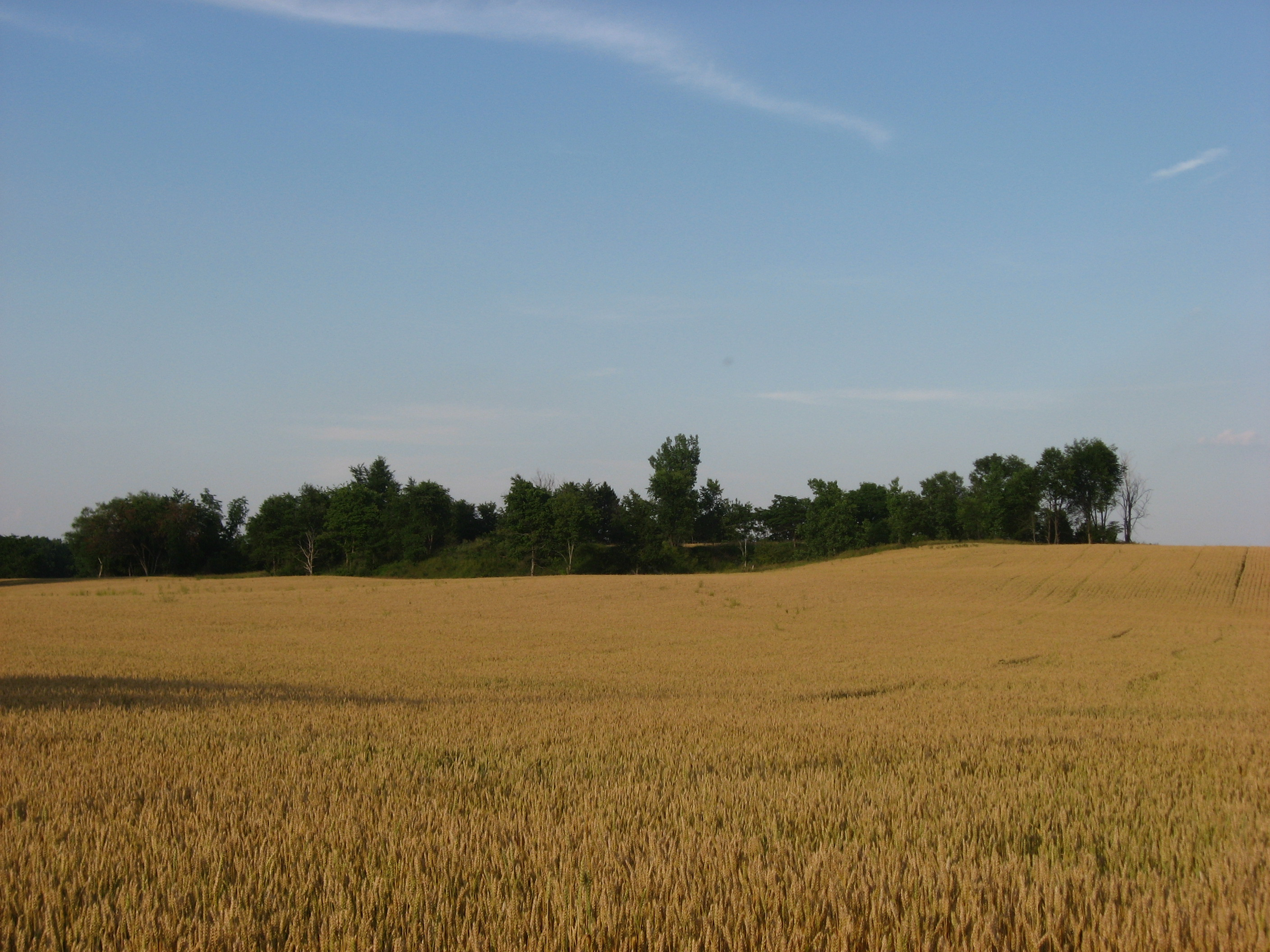
- Countryside in western McDonald Township

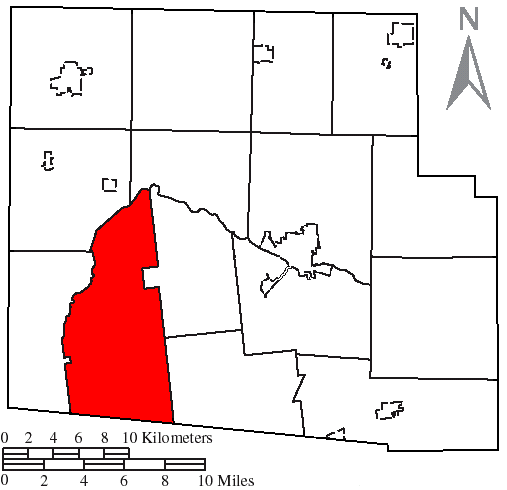
- Location of McDonald Township, Hardin County, Ohio
- Coordinates: 40°35′13″N 83°46′7″W
- Country: United States
- State: Ohio
- County: Hardin

Area
  - Total: 42.9 sq mi (111.1 km^{2})
  - Land: 42.9 sq mi (111.1 km^{2})
  - Water: 0 sq mi (0.0 km^{2})
- Elevation: 1,050 ft (320 m)

Population (2020)
  - Total: 874
  - Density: 20.4/sq mi (7.87/km^{2})
- Time zone: UTC-5 (Eastern (EST))
  - Summer (DST): UTC-4 (EDT)
- FIPS code: 39-45920
- GNIS feature ID: 1086265

McDonald Township is one of the fifteen townships of Hardin County, Ohio, United States. As of the 2020 census the population was 874.

== Geography ==
Located in the southwestern part of the county, it borders the following townships:

- Cessna Township - north
- Lynn Township - northeast
- Taylor Creek Township - southeast
- Richland Township, Logan County - south
- Roundhead Township - west
- Marion Township - northwest

No municipalities are located in McDonald Township.

== Name and history ==
McDonald Township was established in the 1830s. This township was named for William McDonald, an early settler. It is the only McDonald Township statewide.

McDonald Township is the location of the Zimmerman Kame, a burial site used by the ancient Glacial Kame culture of Native Americans.

== Government ==
The township is governed by a three-member board of trustees, who are elected in November of odd-numbered years to a four-year term beginning on the following January 1. Two are elected in the year after the presidential election and one is elected in the year before it. There is also an elected township fiscal officer, who serves a four-year term beginning on April 1 of the year after the election, which is held in November of the year before the presidential election. Vacancies in the fiscal officership or on the board of trustees are filled by the remaining trustees.
