= Jackson Township, Hardin County, Ohio =

Township in Ohio, US

- Township
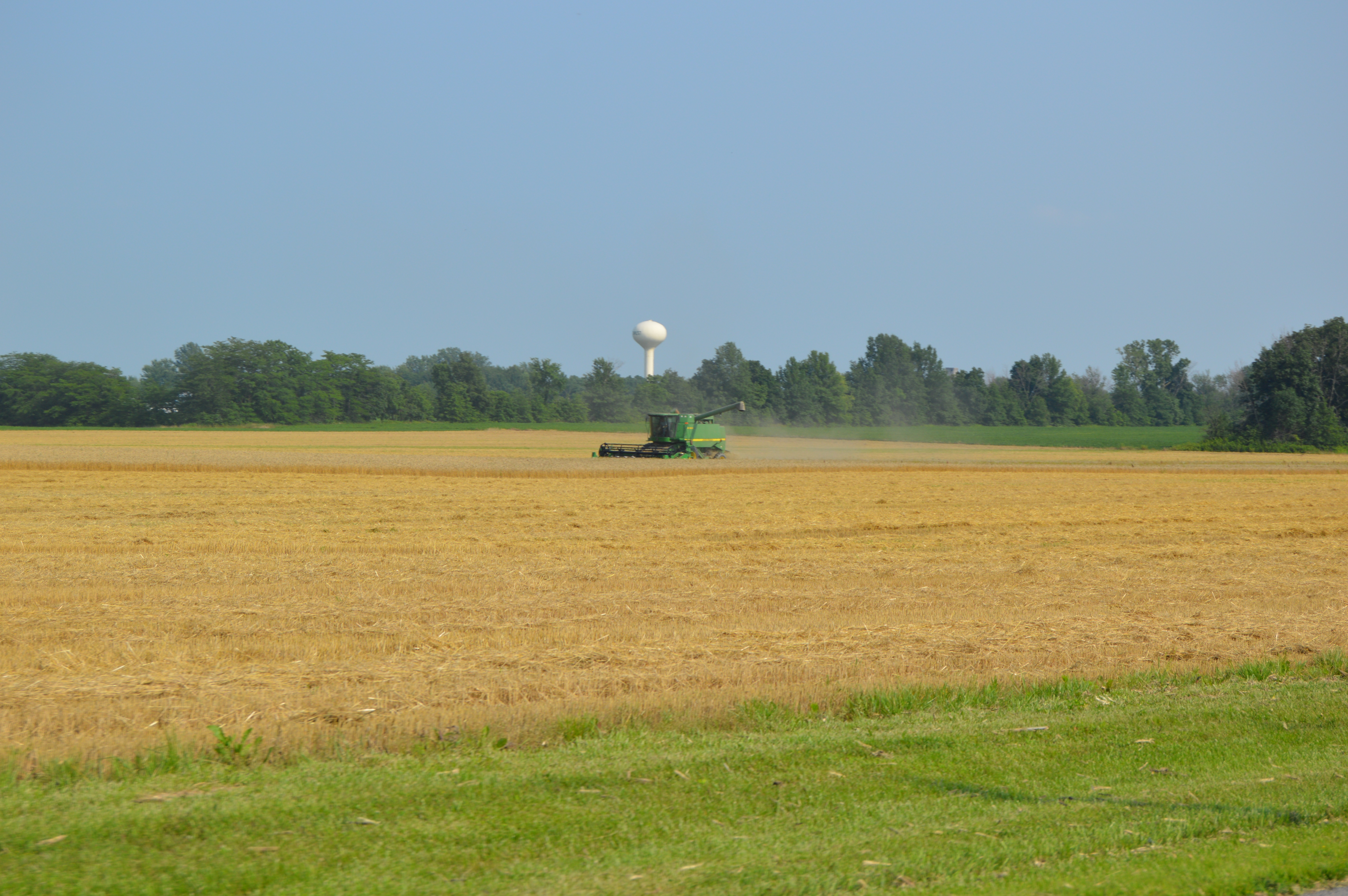
- Wheat harvest outside of Forest

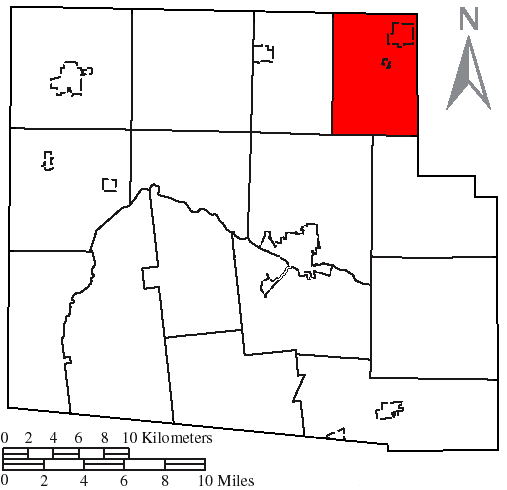
- Location of Jackson Township, Hardin County, Ohio
- Coordinates: 40°47′40″N 83°31′40″W
- Country: United States
- State: Ohio
- County: Hardin

Area
  - Total: 25.3 sq mi (65.5 km^{2})
  - Land: 25.3 sq mi (65.5 km^{2})
  - Water: 0 sq mi (0.0 km^{2})
- Elevation: 932 ft (284 m)

Population (2020)
  - Total: 2,029
  - Density: 80.2/sq mi (31.0/km^{2})
- Time zone: UTC-5 (Eastern (EST))
  - Summer (DST): UTC-4 (EDT)
- FIPS code: 39-37814
- GNIS feature ID: 1086262

Jackson Township is one of the fifteen townships of Hardin County, Ohio, United States. As of the 2020 census the population was 2,029.

== Geography ==
Located in the northeastern corner of the county, it borders the following townships:

- Delaware Township, Hancock County - north
- Richland Township, Wyandot County - northeast
- Jackson Township, Wyandot County - east
- Goshen Township - southeast
- Pleasant Township - southwest
- Blanchard Township - west

Two villages are located in Jackson Township: Forest in the northeast, and Patterson in the center.

== Name and history ==
Jackson Township was organized in 1836, and named for Andrew Jackson (1767–1845), the seventh President of the United States (1829–1837). It is one of thirty-seven Jackson Townships statewide.

== Government ==
The township is governed by a three-member board of trustees, who are elected in November of odd-numbered years to a four-year term beginning on the following January 1. Two are elected in the year after the presidential election and one is elected in the year before it. There is also an elected township fiscal officer, who serves a four-year term beginning on April 1 of the year after the election, which is held in November of the year before the presidential election. Vacancies in the fiscal officership or on the board of trustees are filled by the remaining trustees.
