= Taylor Creek Township, Hardin County, Ohio =

Township in Ohio, US

- Township
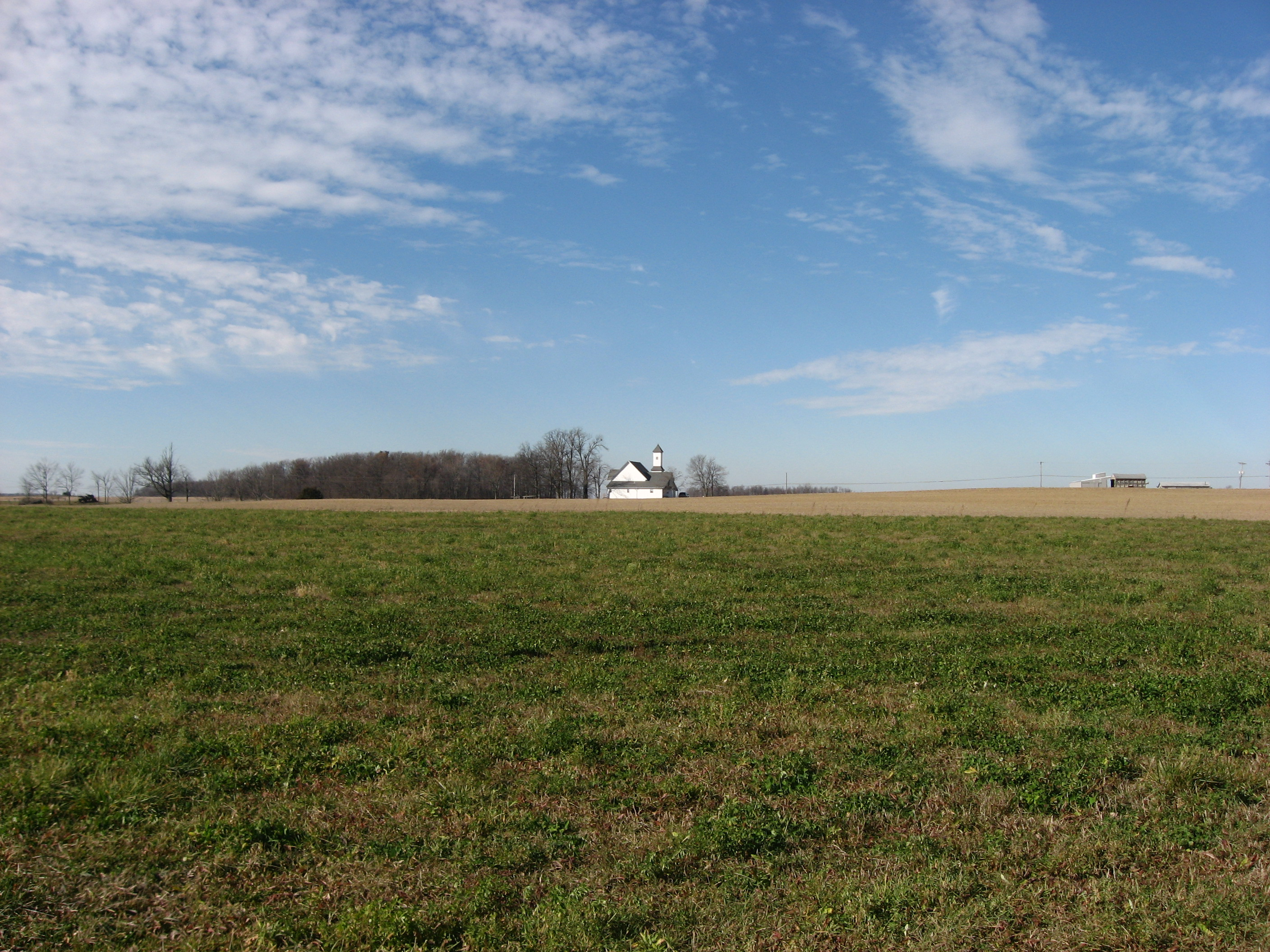
- Countryside in Taylor Creek Township

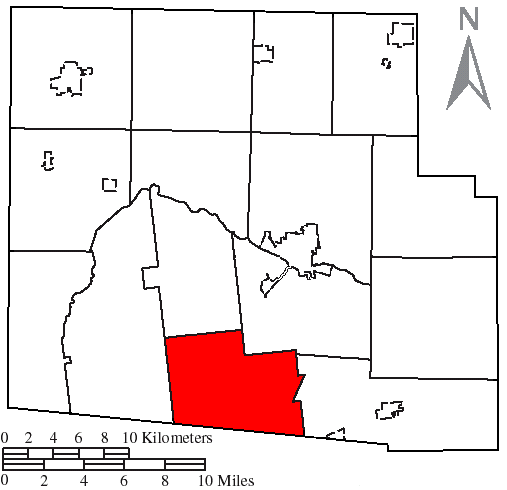
- Location of Taylor Creek Township, Hardin County, Ohio
- Coordinates: 40°33′1″N 83°40′24″W
- Country: United States
- State: Ohio
- County: Hardin

Area
  - Total: 27.9 sq mi (72.2 km^{2})
  - Land: 27.9 sq mi (72.2 km^{2})
  - Water: 0 sq mi (0.0 km^{2})
- Elevation: 1,066 ft (325 m)

Population (2020)
  - Total: 593
  - Density: 21.3/sq mi (8.21/km^{2})
- Time zone: UTC-5 (Eastern (EST))
  - Summer (DST): UTC-4 (EDT)
- FIPS code: 39-76198
- GNIS feature ID: 1086269

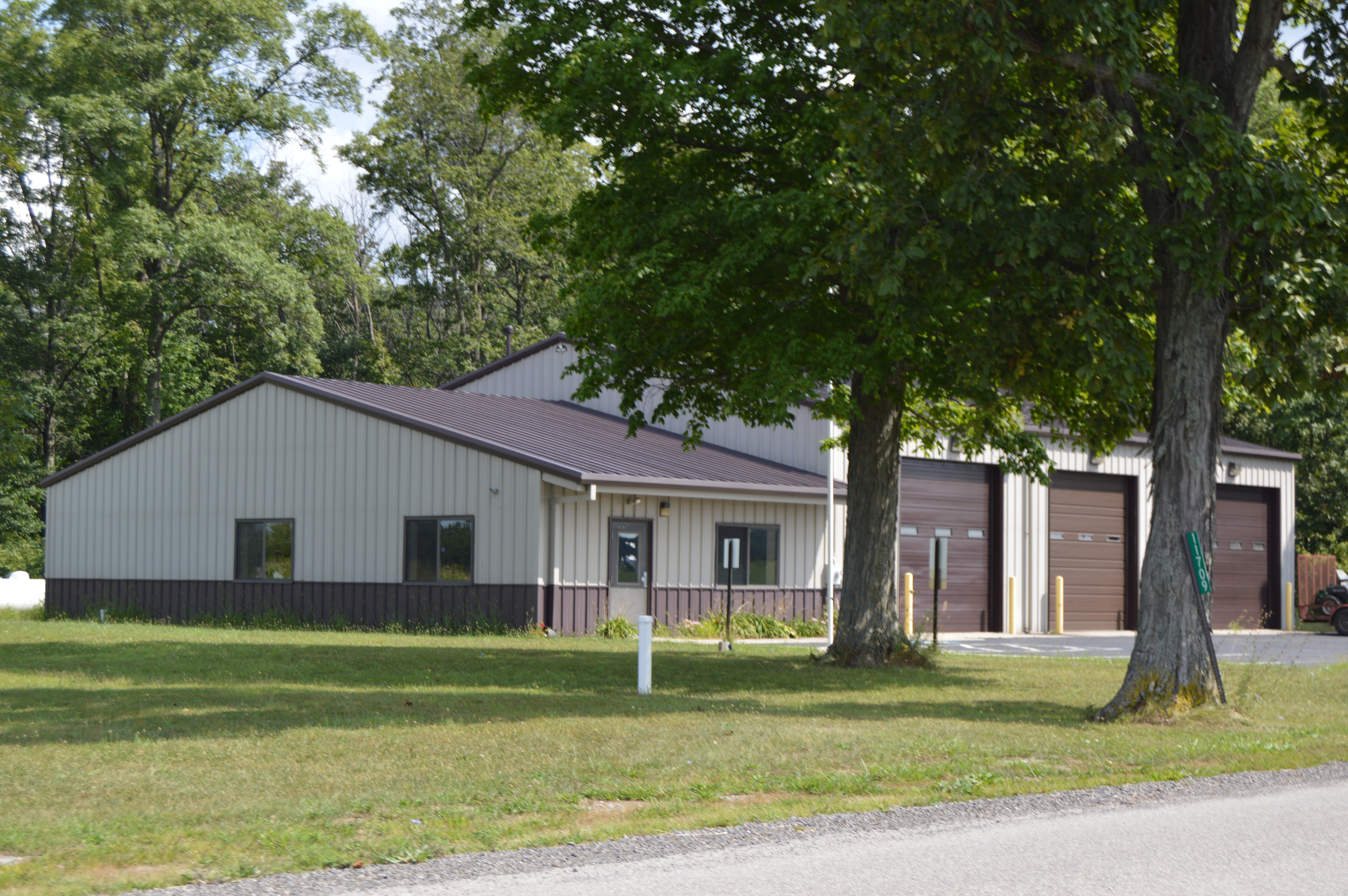
Township hall

Taylor Creek Township is one of the fifteen townships of Hardin County, Ohio, United States. As of the 2020 census the population was 593.

== Geography ==
Located in the southern part of the county, it borders the following townships:

- Buck Township - northeast
- Hale Township - east
- Bokes Creek Township, Logan County - southeast
- Rushcreek Township, Logan County - south
- Richland Township, Logan County - southwest
- Lynn Township - west
- McDonald Township - northwest

No municipalities are located in Taylor Creek Township.

== Name and history ==
Taylor Creek Township was organized around 1833. This township was named for James Taylor, Jr., an officer in the War of 1812. It is the only Taylor Creek Township statewide, although there is a Taylor Township in Union County.

== Government ==
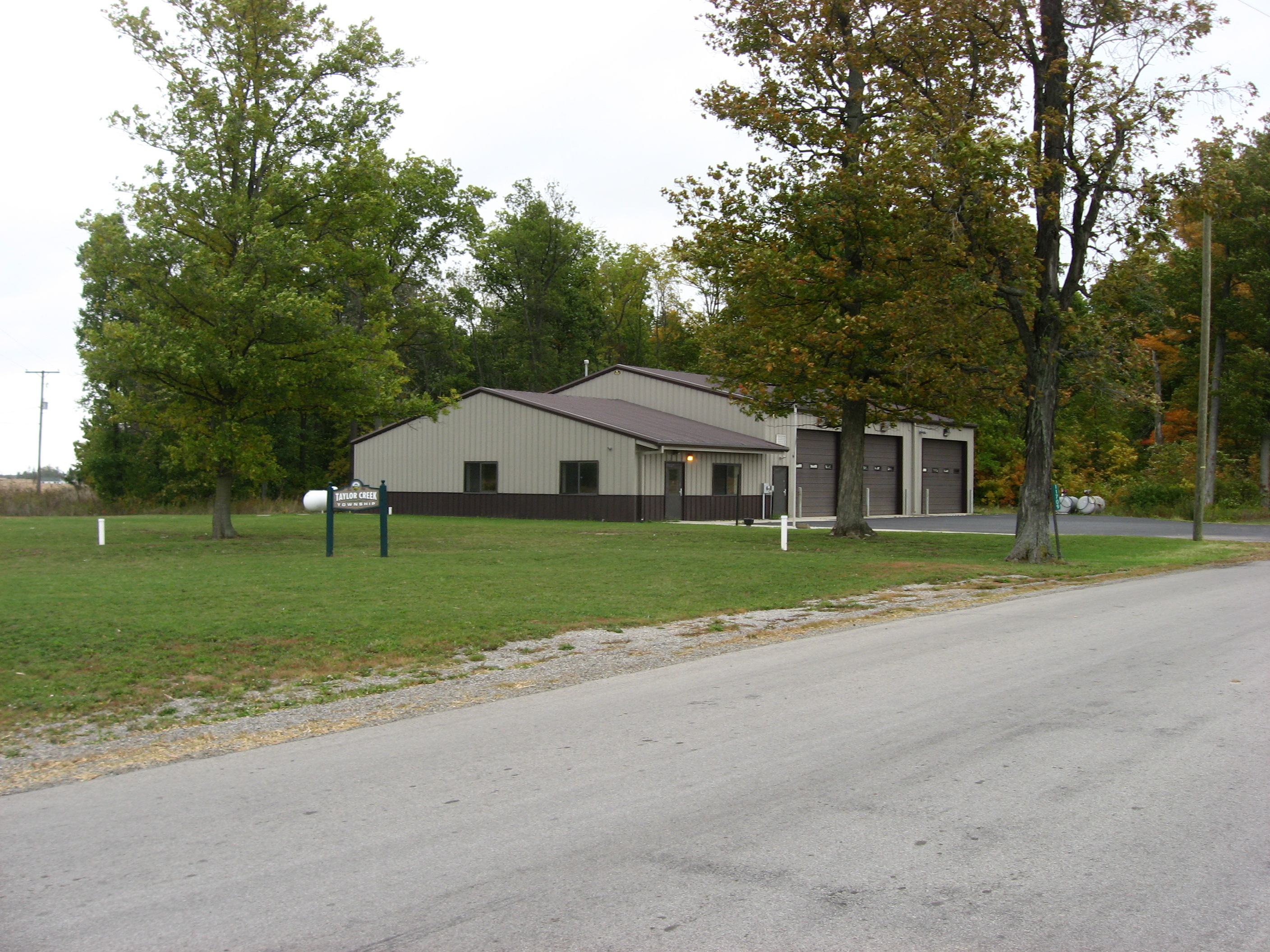
Taylor Creek Township Hall

The township is governed by a three-member board of trustees, who are elected in November of odd-numbered years to a four-year term beginning on the following January 1. Two are elected in the year after the presidential election and one is elected in the year before it. There is also an elected township fiscal officer, who serves a four-year term beginning on April 1 of the year after the election, which is held in November of the year before the presidential election. Vacancies in the fiscal officership or on the board of trustees are filled by the remaining trustees.
