= Marseilles, Ohio =

- Village
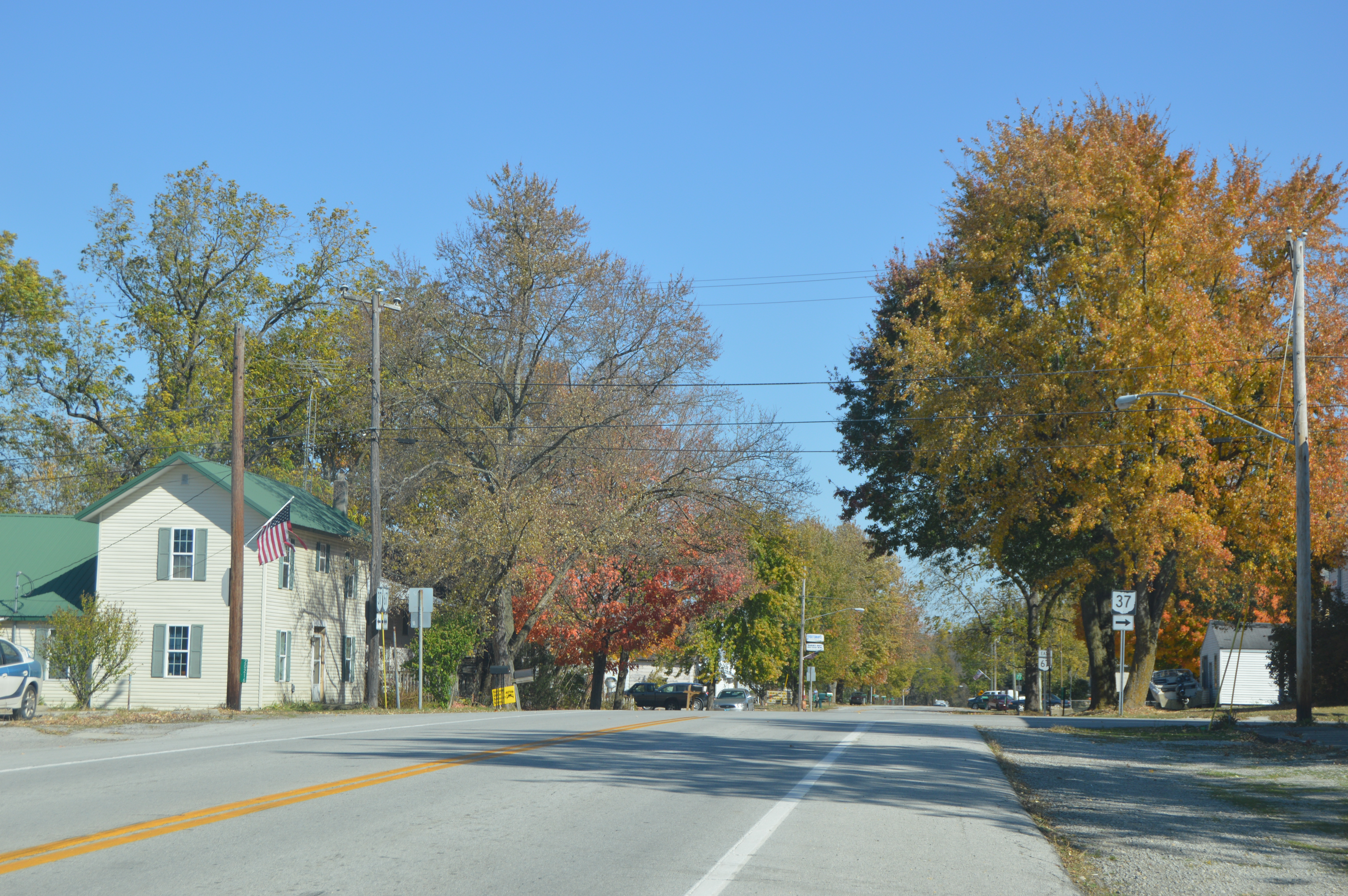
- Downtown Marseilles

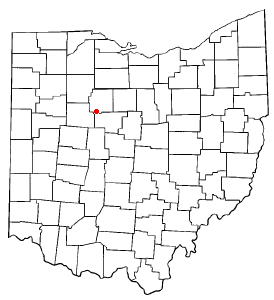
- Location of Marseilles, Ohio

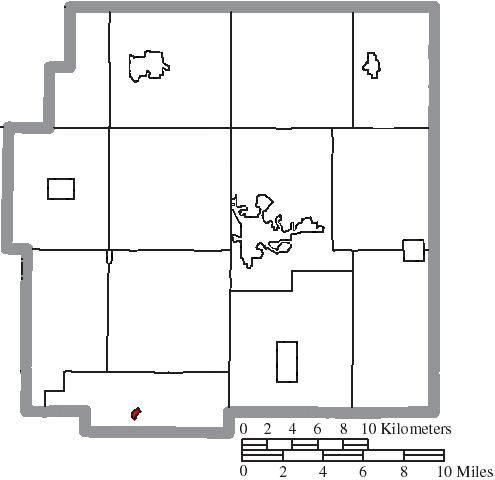
- Location of Marseilles in Wyandot County
- Coordinates: 40°42′04″N 83°23′32″W
- Country: United States
- State: Ohio
- County: Wyandot
- Township: Marseilles

Area
  - Total: 0.097 sq mi (0.25 km^{2})
  - Land: 0.097 sq mi (0.25 km^{2})
  - Water: 0 sq mi (0.00 km^{2})
- Elevation: 879 ft (268 m)

Population (2020)
  - Total: 93
  - Density: 952.7/sq mi (367.83/km^{2})
- Time zone: UTC-5 (Eastern (EST))
  - Summer (DST): UTC-4 (EDT)
- FIPS code: 39-47992
- GNIS feature ID: 2399262

Marseilles is a village in Wyandot County, Ohio, United States, located at the western edge of the Killdeer Plains Wildlife Area. The population was 93 at the 2020 census.

== History ==
The village was named after Marseille, France.

On March 5, 1967, Lake Central Flight 527 en route from Columbus to Toledo, crashed in a field near the Wyandot/Hardin County line near the Village of Marseilles. The cause of the crash was determined to be fatigue on the propeller of the plane, which separated and crashed through the cabin. All passengers and crew on the plane (a total of 38 people) were killed.

== Geography ==
According to the United States Census Bureau, the village has a total area of 0.10 square miles (0.26 km^{2}), all land.

State Route 67 runs through Marseilles, in which it serves as the main street.

== Demographics ==
Historical population
Census	Pop.	Note	%±
1870	251		—
1880	273		8.8%
1890	213		−22.0%
1900	251		17.8%
1910	225		−10.4%
1920	179		−20.4%
1930	148		−17.3%
1940	149		0.7%
1950	156		4.7%
1960	171		9.6%
1970	155		−9.4%
1980	164		5.8%
1990	130		−20.7%
2000	124		−4.6%
2010	112		−9.7%
2020	93		−17.0%
U.S. Decennial Census

=== 2010 census ===
As of the census of 2010, there were 112 people, 45 households, and 31 families living in the village. The population density was 1,120.0 inhabitants per square mile (432.4/km^{2}). There were 52 housing units at an average density of 520.0 per square mile (200.8/km^{2}). The racial makeup of the village was 99.1% White and 0.9% Native American.

There were 45 households, of which 33.3% had children under the age of 18 living with them, 48.9% were married couples living together, 17.8% had a female householder with no husband present, 2.2% had a male householder with no wife present, and 31.1% were non-families. 26.7% of all households were made up of individuals, and 8.9% had someone living alone who was 65 years of age or older. The average household size was 2.49 and the average family size was 3.00.

The median age in the village was 40 years. 29.5% of residents were under the age of 18; 0.9% were between the ages of 18 and 24; 27.7% were from 25 to 44; 27.7% were from 45 to 64; and 14.3% were 65 years of age or older. The gender makeup of the village was 50.9% male and 49.1% female.

=== 2000 census ===
As of the census of 2000, there were 124 people, 48 households, and 33 families living in the village. The population density was 1,294.9 inhabitants per square mile (500.0/km^{2}). There were 54 housing units at an average density of 563.9 per square mile (217.7/km^{2}). The racial makeup of the village was 99.19% White and 0.81% African American.

There were 48 households, out of which 35.4% had children under the age of 18 living with them, 58.3% were married couples living together, 8.3% had a female householder with no husband present, and 29.2% were non-families. 22.9% of all households were made up of individuals, and 10.4% had someone living alone who was 65 years of age or older. The average household size was 2.58 and the average family size was 3.06.

In the village, the population was spread out, with 25.8% under the age of 18, 4.0% from 18 to 24, 36.3% from 25 to 44, 23.4% from 45 to 64, and 10.5% who were 65 years of age or older. The median age was 35 years. For every 100 females there were 93.8 males. For every 100 females age 18 and over, there were 100.0 males.

The median income for a household in the village was $45,000, and the median income for a family was $46,875. Males had a median income of $27,917 versus $20,625 for females. The per capita income for the village was $14,852. There were 6.5% of families and 5.9% of the population living below the poverty line, including 4.9% of under eighteens and 25.0% of those over 64.

== Notable people ==
- Paul M. Herbert, Lieutenant Governor of Ohio and Associate Ohio Supreme Court Justice.
- James H. Miller, Speaker of the Illinois House of Representatives
