= Marion Township, Hardin County, Ohio =

Township in Ohio, US

- Township
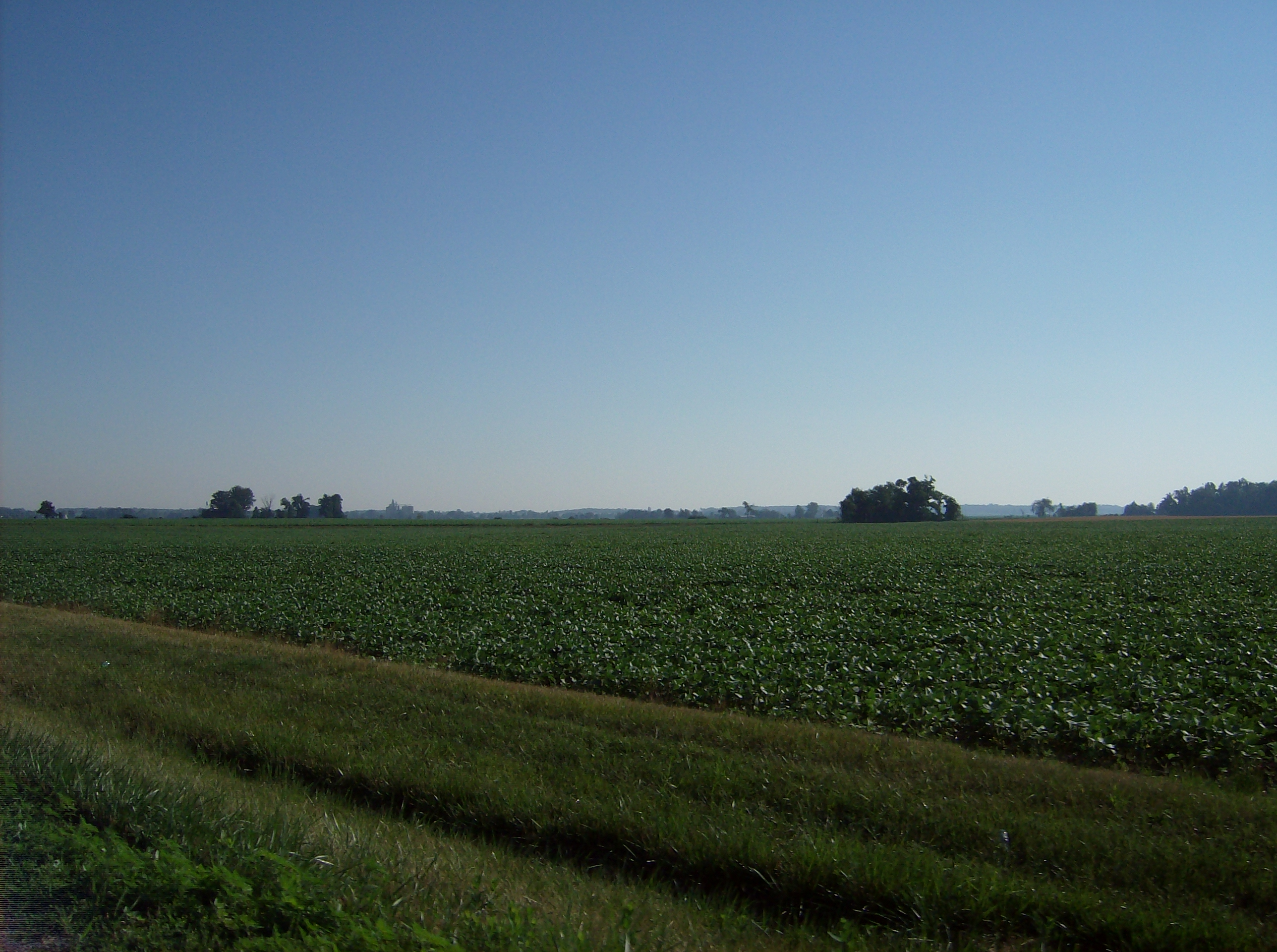
- Farm fields in Marion Township

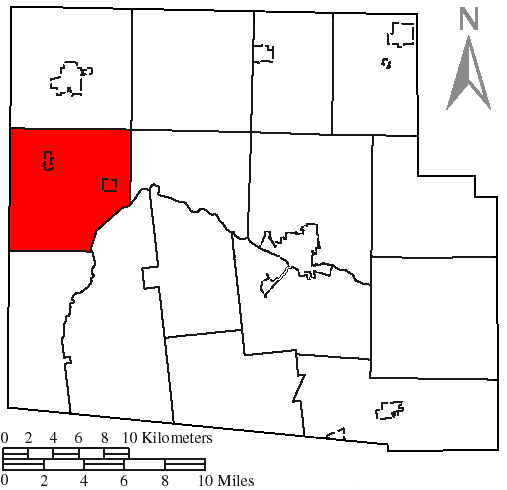
- Location of Marion Township, Hardin County, Ohio
- Coordinates: 40°41′49″N 83°49′23″W
- Country: United States
- State: Ohio
- County: Hardin

Area
  - Total: 33.2 sq mi (86.0 km^{2})
  - Land: 33.2 sq mi (86.0 km^{2})
  - Water: 0 sq mi (0.0 km^{2})
- Elevation: 968 ft (295 m)

Population (2020)
  - Total: 2,301
  - Density: 69.3/sq mi (26.8/km^{2})
- Time zone: UTC-5 (Eastern (EST))
  - Summer (DST): UTC-4 (EDT)
- FIPS code: 39-47712
- GNIS feature ID: 1086266

Marion Township is one of the fifteen townships of Hardin County, Ohio, United States. As of the 2020 census the population was 2,301.

== Geography ==
Located in the western part of the county, it borders the following townships:

- Liberty Township - north
- Washington Township - northeast corner
- Cessna Township - east
- McDonald Township - southeast
- Roundhead Township - south
- Wayne Township, Auglaize County - southwest corner
- Auglaize Township, Allen County - west
- Jackson Township, Allen County - northwest corner

Two villages are located in Marion Township: Alger in the northwest, and McGuffey in the east.

== Name and history ==
Marion Township was organized in 1856, and named for Francis Marion, an army officer during the American Revolutionary War. It is one of twelve Marion Townships statewide.

== Government ==
The township is governed by a three-member board of trustees, who are elected in November of odd-numbered years to a four-year term beginning on the following January 1. Two are elected in the year after the presidential election and one is elected in the year before it. There is also an elected township fiscal officer, who serves a four-year term beginning on April 1 of the year after the election, which is held in November of the year before the presidential election. Vacancies in the fiscal officership or on the board of trustees are filled by the remaining trustees.
