= Washington Township, Hardin County, Ohio =

Township in Ohio, US

- Township
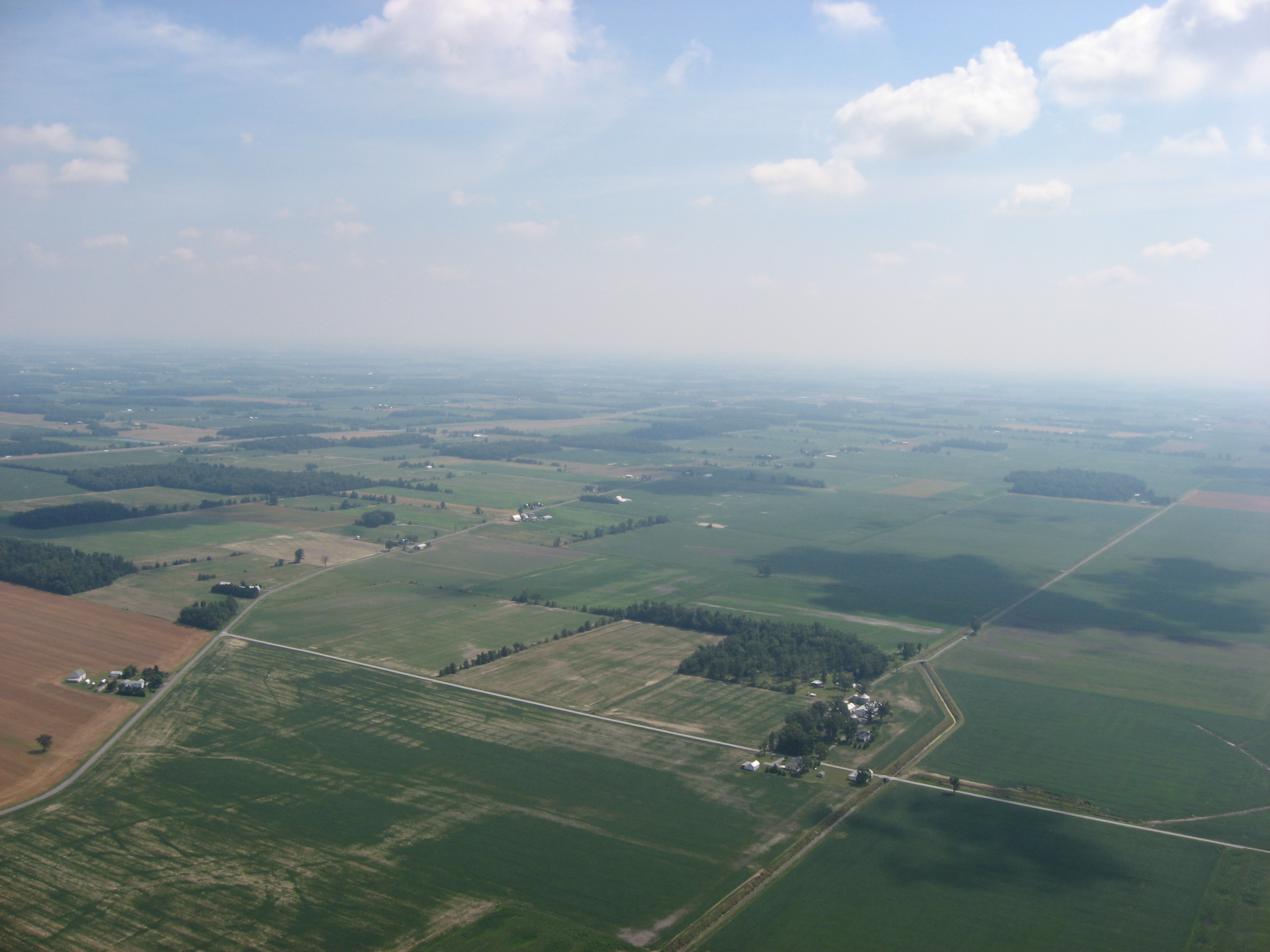
- Countryside in Washington Township

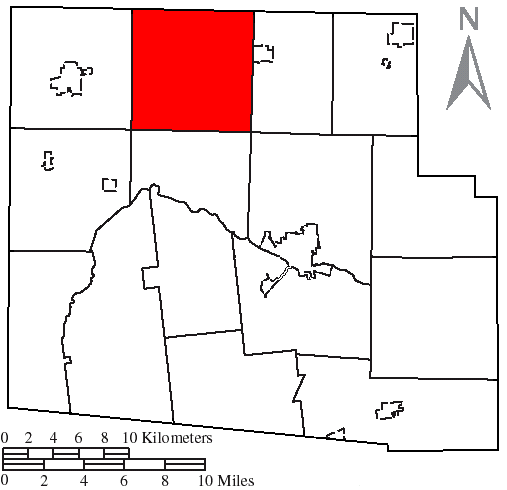
- Location of Washington Township, Hardin County, Ohio
- Coordinates: 40°46′45″N 83°42′35″W
- Country: United States
- State: Ohio
- County: Hardin

Area
  - Total: 35.9 sq mi (92.9 km^{2})
  - Land: 35.9 sq mi (92.9 km^{2})
  - Water: 0 sq mi (0.0 km^{2})
- Elevation: 942 ft (287 m)

Population (2020)
  - Total: 740
  - Density: 21/sq mi (8.0/km^{2})
- Time zone: UTC-5 (Eastern (EST))
  - Summer (DST): UTC-4 (EDT)
- FIPS code: 39-81298
- GNIS feature ID: 1086270

Washington Township is one of the fifteen townships of Hardin County, Ohio, United States. As of the 2020 census the population was 740.

== Geography ==
Located in the northern part of the county, it borders the following townships:

- Van Buren Township, Hancock County - north
- Madison Township, Hancock County - northeast
- Blanchard Township - east
- Pleasant Township - southeast corner
- Cessna Township - south
- Marion Township - southwest corner
- Liberty Township - west
- Orange Township, Hancock County - northwest corner

No municipalities are located in Washington Township, although the census-designated place of Dola lies in the center of the township.

== Name and history ==
Washington Township was organized in 1835, and named for George Washington, first President of the United States. It is one of forty-three Washington Townships statewide.

== Government ==
The township is governed by a three-member board of trustees, who are elected in November of odd-numbered years to a four-year term beginning on the following January 1. Two are elected in the year after the presidential election and one is elected in the year before it. There is also an elected township fiscal officer, who serves a four-year term beginning on April 1 of the year after the election, which is held in November of the year before the presidential election. Vacancies in the fiscal officership or on the board of trustees are filled by the remaining trustees.
