= Pleasant Township =

Pleasant Township may refer to:

== Illinois ==
- Pleasant Township, Fulton County, Illinois

== Indiana ==
- Pleasant Township, Allen County, Indiana
- Pleasant Township, Grant County, Indiana
- Pleasant Township, Johnson County, Indiana
- Pleasant Township, LaPorte County, Indiana
- Pleasant Township, Porter County, Indiana
- Pleasant Township, Steuben County, Indiana
- Pleasant Township, Switzerland County, Indiana
- Pleasant Township, Wabash County, Indiana

== Iowa ==
- Pleasant Township, Appanoose County, Iowa
- Pleasant Township, Cass County, Iowa
- Pleasant Township, Hardin County, Iowa
- Pleasant Township, Lucas County, Iowa
- Pleasant Township, Monroe County, Iowa
- Pleasant Township, Pottawattamie County, Iowa
- Pleasant Township, Poweshiek County, Iowa
- Pleasant Township, Union County, Iowa, in Union County, Iowa
- Pleasant Township, Wapello County, Iowa
- Pleasant Township, Winneshiek County, Iowa, in Winneshiek County, Iowa
- Pleasant Township, Wright County, Iowa

== Kansas ==
- Pleasant Township, Butler County, Kansas
- Pleasant Township, Coffey County, Kansas
- Pleasant Township, Harvey County, Kansas
- Pleasant Township, Lincoln County, Kansas, in Lincoln County, Kansas
- Pleasant Township, Smith County, Kansas, in Smith County, Kansas

== North Dakota ==
- Pleasant Township, Cass County, North Dakota, in Cass County, North Dakota

== Ohio ==
- Pleasant Township, Brown County, Ohio
- Pleasant Township, Clark County, Ohio
- Pleasant Township, Fairfield County, Ohio
- Pleasant Township, Franklin County, Ohio
- Pleasant Township, Hancock County, Ohio
- Pleasant Township, Hardin County, Ohio
- Pleasant Township, Henry County, Ohio
- Pleasant Township, Knox County, Ohio
- Pleasant Township, Logan County, Ohio
- Pleasant Township, Madison County, Ohio
- Pleasant Township, Marion County, Ohio
- Pleasant Township, Perry County, Ohio
- Pleasant Township, Putnam County, Ohio
- Pleasant Township, Seneca County, Ohio
- Pleasant Township, Van Wert County, Ohio

== Pennsylvania ==
- Pleasant Township, Pennsylvania

== South Dakota ==
- Pleasant Township, Clark County, South Dakota, in Clark County, South Dakota
- Pleasant Township, Hanson County, South Dakota, in Hanson County, South Dakota
- Pleasant Township, Hutchinson County, South Dakota, in Hutchinson County, South Dakota
- Pleasant Township, Jerauld County, South Dakota, in Jerauld County, South Dakota
- Pleasant Township, Lincoln County, South Dakota, in Lincoln County, South Dakota
- Pleasant Township, Lyman County, South Dakota, in Lyman County, South Dakota
