= Cessna Township, Ohio =

Township in Ohio, US

Cessna Township, Hardin County, Ohio
- Township
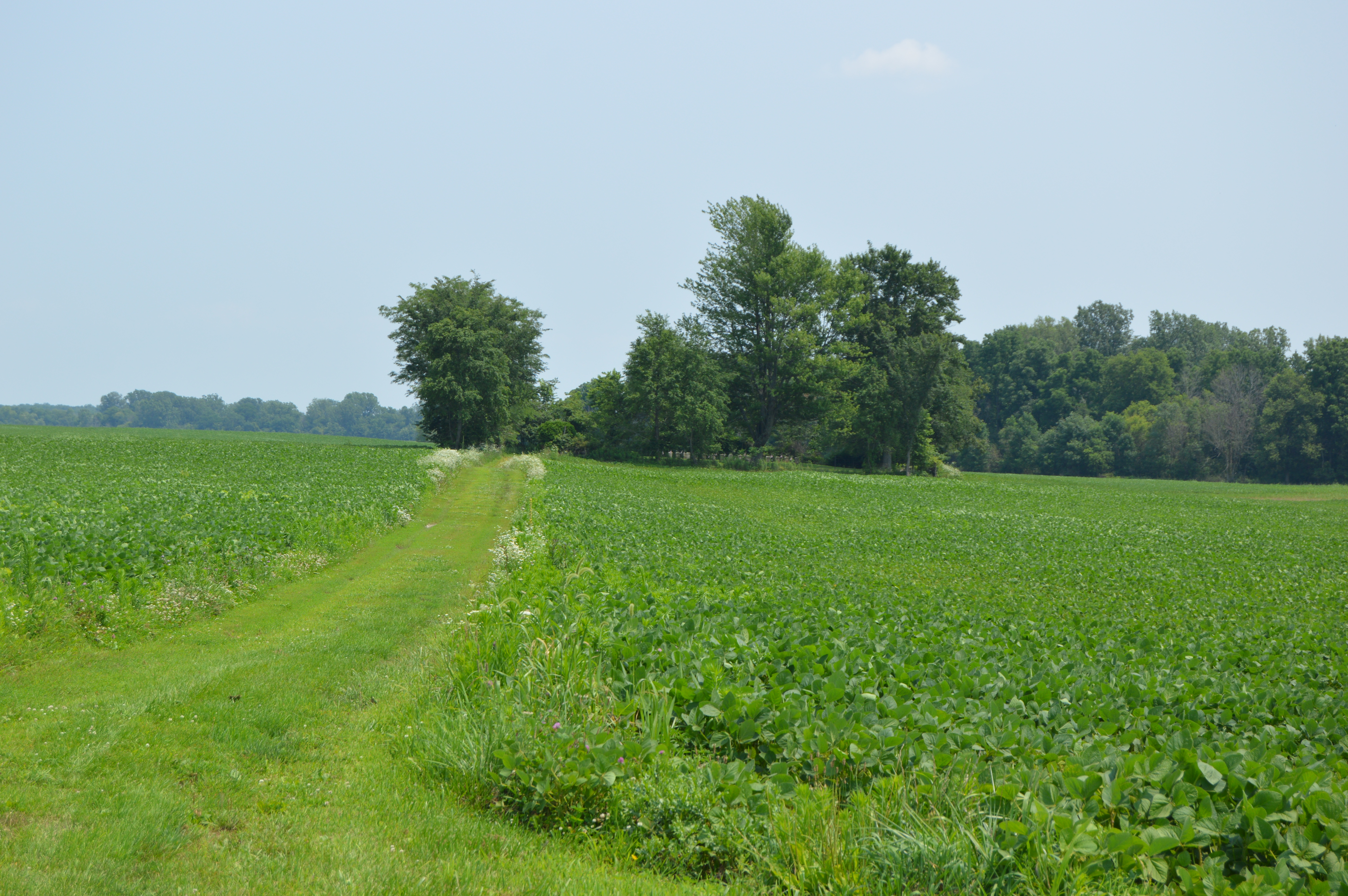
- War of 1812 cemetery on Township Road 115

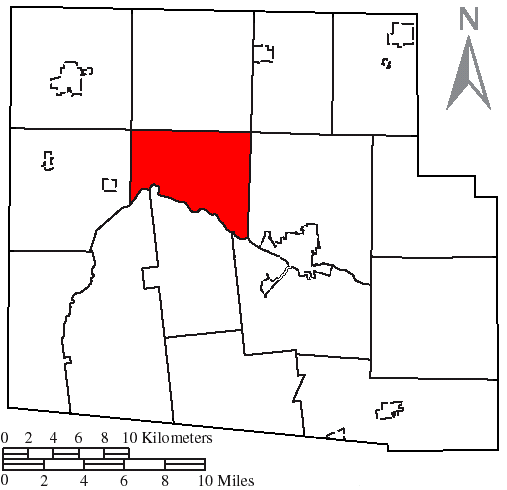
- Location of Cessna Township, Hardin County, Ohio
- Coordinates: 40°42′3″N 83°42′6″W
- Country: United States
- State: Ohio
- County: Hardin

Area
  - Total: 22.9 sq mi (59.2 km^{2})
  - Land: 22.9 sq mi (59.2 km^{2})
  - Water: 0 sq mi (0.0 km^{2})
- Elevation: 1,007 ft (307 m)

Population (2020)
  - Total: 501
  - Density: 21.9/sq mi (8.46/km^{2})
- Time zone: UTC-5 (Eastern (EST))
  - Summer (DST): UTC-4 (EDT)
- FIPS code: 39-13316
- GNIS feature ID: 1086258
- Website: https://www.cessnatwp.org/

Cessna Township is one of the fifteen townships of Hardin County, Ohio, United States. As of the 2020 census the population was 501.

== Geography ==
Located in the western center of the county, it borders the following townships:

- Washington Township - north
- Blanchard Township - northeast corner
- Pleasant Township - east
- Buck Township - southeast
- Lynn Township - south
- McDonald Township - southwest
- Marion Township - west
- Liberty Township - northwest corner

No municipalities are located in Cessna Township.

== Name and history ==
Cessna Township was established in 1834, and named in honor of Charles Cessna, a pioneer settler. It is the only Cessna Township statewide.

== Government ==
The township is governed by a three-member board of trustees, who are elected in November of odd-numbered years to a four-year term beginning on the following January 1. Two are elected in the year after the presidential election and one is elected in the year before it. There is also an elected township fiscal officer, who serves a four-year term beginning on April 1 of the year after the election, which is held in November of the year before the presidential election. Vacancies in the fiscal officership or on the board of trustees are filled by the remaining trustees.
