= Liberty Township, Hardin County, Ohio =

Township in Ohio, US

- Township
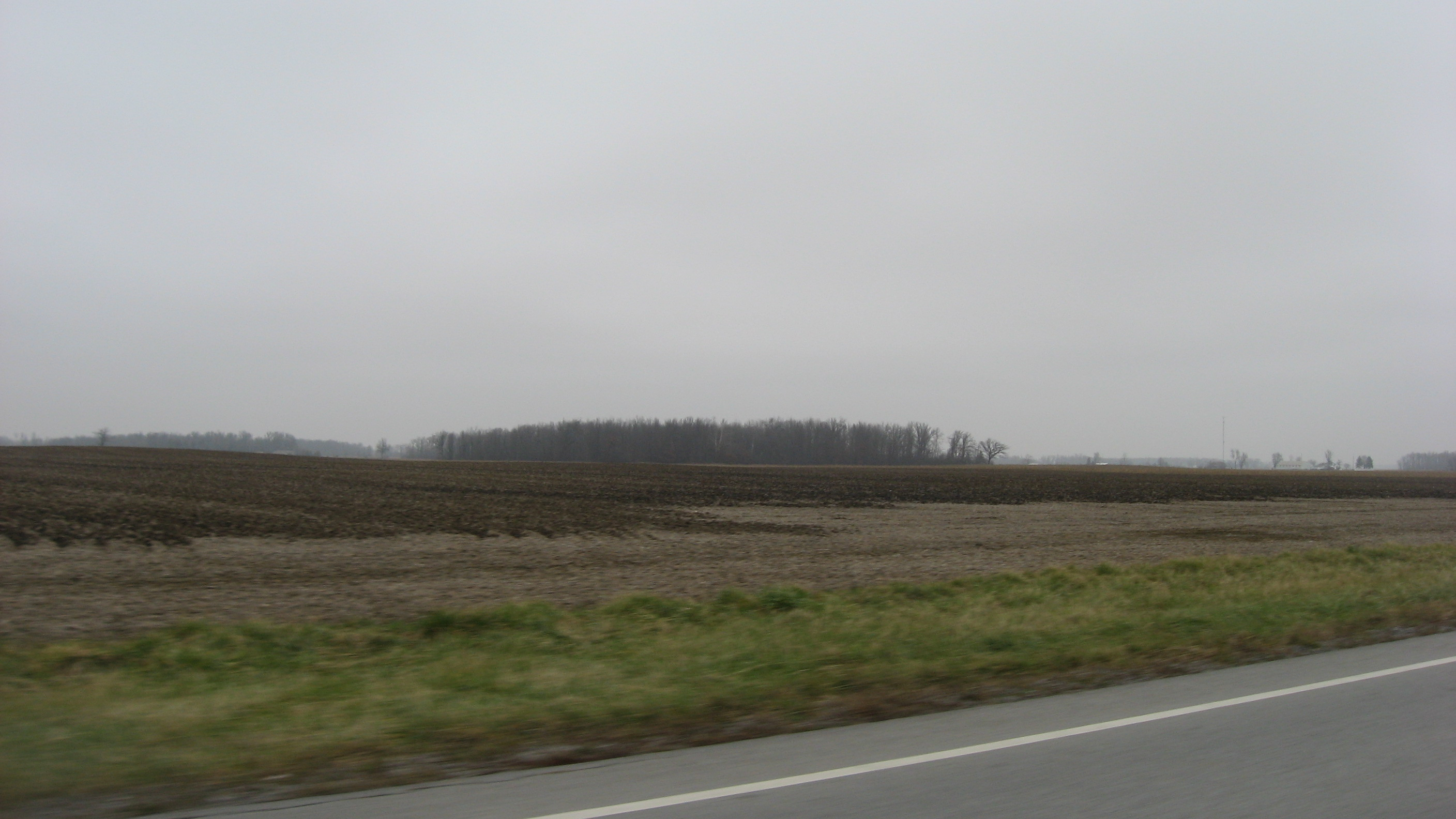
- Fields in eastern Liberty Township

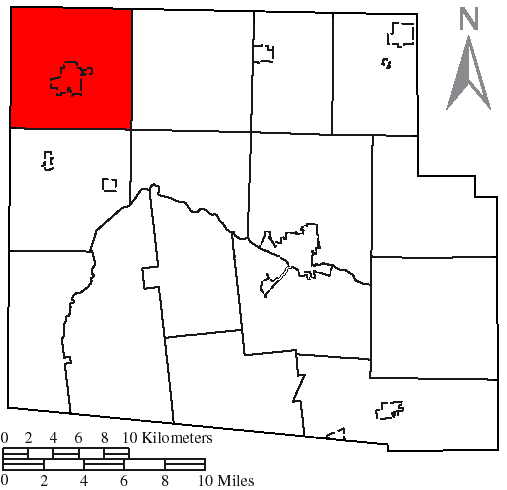
- Location of Liberty Township, Hardin County, Ohio
- Coordinates: 40°46′18″N 83°49′15″W
- Country: United States
- State: Ohio
- County: Hardin

Area
  - Total: 35.8 sq mi (92.8 km^{2})
  - Land: 35.8 sq mi (92.8 km^{2})
  - Water: 0 sq mi (0.0 km^{2})
- Elevation: 958 ft (292 m)

Population (2020)
  - Total: 7,060
  - Density: 197/sq mi (76.1/km^{2})
- Time zone: UTC-5 (Eastern (EST))
  - Summer (DST): UTC-4 (EDT)
- FIPS code: 39-43162
- GNIS feature ID: 1086263

Liberty Township is one of the fifteen townships of Hardin County, Ohio, United States. As of the 2020 census, the population was 7,060.

== Geography ==
Located in the northwestern corner of the county, it borders the following townships:

- Orange Township, Hancock County - north
- Van Buren Township, Hancock County - northeast corner
- Washington Township - east
- Cessna Township - southeast corner
- Marion Township - south
- Auglaize Township, Allen County - southwest corner
- Jackson Township, Allen County - west
- Richland Township, Allen County - northwest corner

The village of Ada is located in central Liberty Township.

== Name and history ==
Liberty Township was organized in 1837. It is one of twenty-five Liberty Townships statewide.

== Government ==
The township is governed by a three-member board of trustees, who are elected in November of odd-numbered years to a four-year term beginning on the following January 1. Two are elected in the year after the presidential election and one is elected in the year before it. There is also an elected township fiscal officer, who serves a four-year term beginning on April 1 of the year after the election, which is held in November of the year before the presidential election. Vacancies in the fiscal officership or on the board of trustees are filled by the remaining trustees.
