= James Hughes Miller =

Illinois politician (1843–1890)

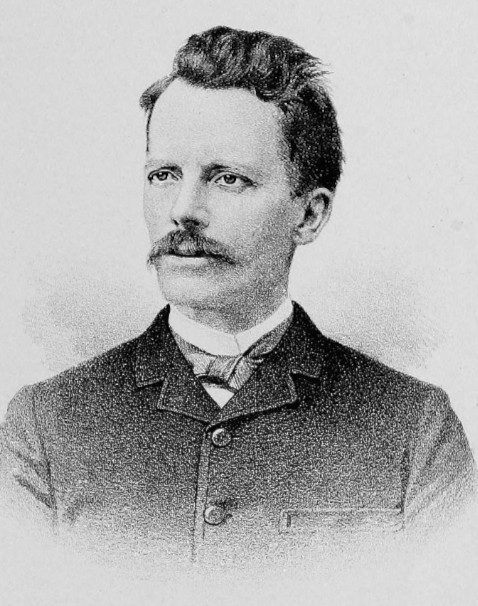

Member of the Illinois House of Representatives
- In office 1884–1890

Personal details
- Born: August 29, 1843 Marseilles, Ohio
- Died: June 27, 1890 (aged 46) Manitou Springs, Colorado
- Party: Republican
- Occupation: Lawyer, politician
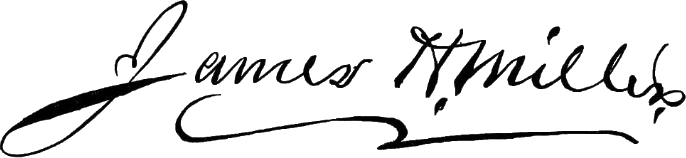
- Signature

James Hughes Miller (August 29, 1843 – June 27, 1890) was a lawyer and state legislator in Illinois. He served as Speaker of the Illinois House of Representatives and was a Republican. He was born in Marseilles, Ohio. He helped establish the Illinois State Historical Library.

== Biography ==
James H. Miller was born in Wyandot County, Ohio on August 29, 1843. His family came to Illinois in 1851, settling first in Winnebago County, and later in neighboring Ogle County. After his formal schooling, he moved to LaSalle County and taught for a school year before enlisting in the 14th Illinois Cavalry Regiment during the American Civil War. After being wounded during the war, he followed his family to Stark County, Illinois where he recovered in Toulon, Illinois and read law. In 1872, Miller was appointed the State's Attorney for Stark County and elected to the position later that year. He served for a single term. He also served as the Village Attorney for Toulon for a time.

Miller was elected as a Republican to the Illinois House of Representatives in 1884 and reelected in 1886. In 1888, he challenged George Hunt, the incumbent Illinois Attorney General, for the Republican nomination in that year's general election. He was defeated by Hunt, who would go on to win reelection. Miller was reelected to the Illinois House of Representatives in the 1888 general election. In 1889, Asa C. Matthews was appointed Comptroller of the Treasury by President Benjamin Harrison. Matthews subsequently resigned from the legislature to take the position. In turn, the House elected Miller as speaker. In ill health, Miller died June 27, 1890, in Manitou Springs, Colorado while vacationing there as part of a recovery effort.

He had a wife and four children. He abided his rule to never say anything bad about anyone living.

== See also ==
- Illinois State Historical Society
