= Marseilles Township, Wyandot County, Ohio =

Township in Ohio, US

- Township
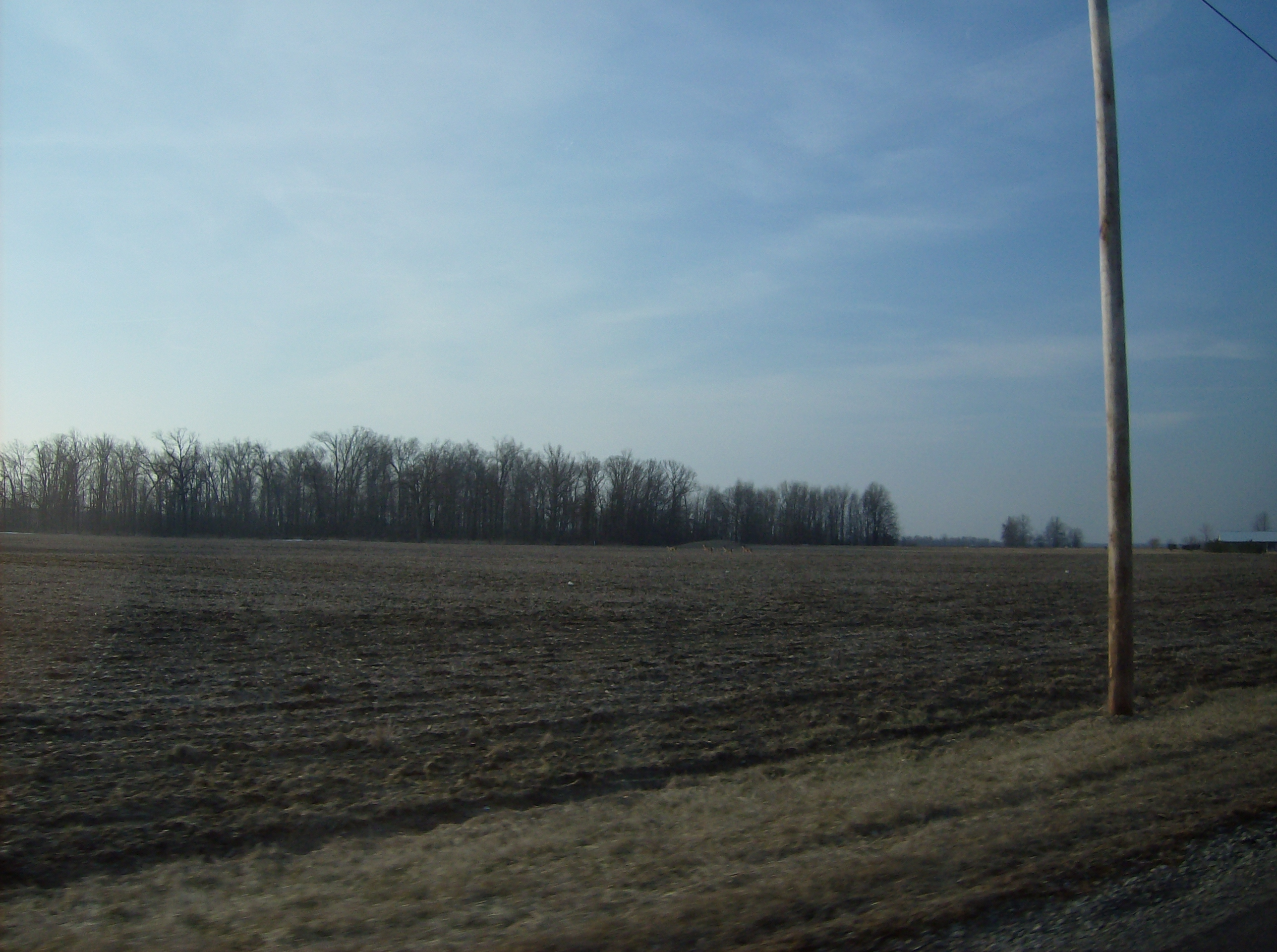
- Fields and small woods near the village of Marseilles

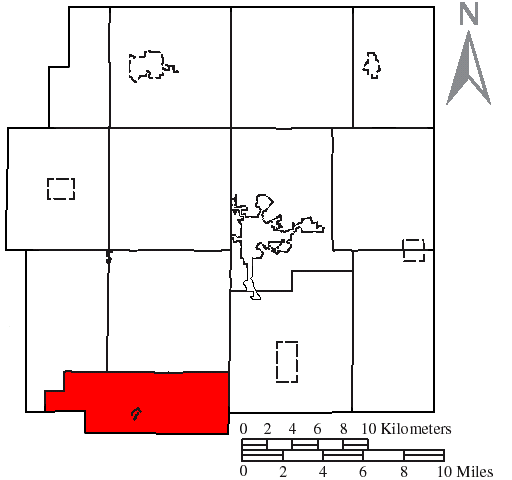
- Location of Marseilles Township in Wyandot County
- Coordinates: 40°42′21″N 83°23′40″W
- Country: United States
- State: Ohio
- County: Wyandot

Area
  - Total: 24.1 sq mi (62.5 km^{2})
  - Land: 23.6 sq mi (61.2 km^{2})
  - Water: 0.46 sq mi (1.2 km^{2})
- Elevation: 873 ft (266 m)

Population (2020)
  - Total: 404
  - Density: 17/sq mi (6.6/km^{2})
- Time zone: UTC-5 (Eastern (EST))
  - Summer (DST): UTC-4 (EDT)
- FIPS code: 39-48006
- GNIS feature ID: 1087207

Marseilles Township is one of the thirteen townships of Wyandot County, Ohio, United States. The 2020 census found 404 people in the township, 93 of whom lived in the village of Marseilles.

== Geography ==
Located in the southwestern part of the county, it borders the following townships:

- Mifflin Township - north
- Pitt Township - northeast
- Salt Rock Township, Marion County - southeast
- Grand Prairie Township, Marion County - south
- Goshen Township, Hardin County - southwest
- Jackson Township - northwest

The village of Marseilles is located in southern Marseilles Township.

== Name and history ==
It is the only Marseilles Township statewide.

== Government ==
The township is governed by a three-member board of trustees, who are elected in November of odd-numbered years to a four-year term beginning on the following January 1. Two are elected in the year after the presidential election and one is elected in the year before it. There is also an elected township fiscal officer, who serves a four-year term beginning on April 1 of the year after the election, which is held in November of the year before the presidential election. Vacancies in the fiscal officership or on the board of trustees are filled by the remaining trustees.
