= Blanchard Township, Hardin County, Ohio =

Township in Ohio, US

Blanchard Township, Ohio
- Township
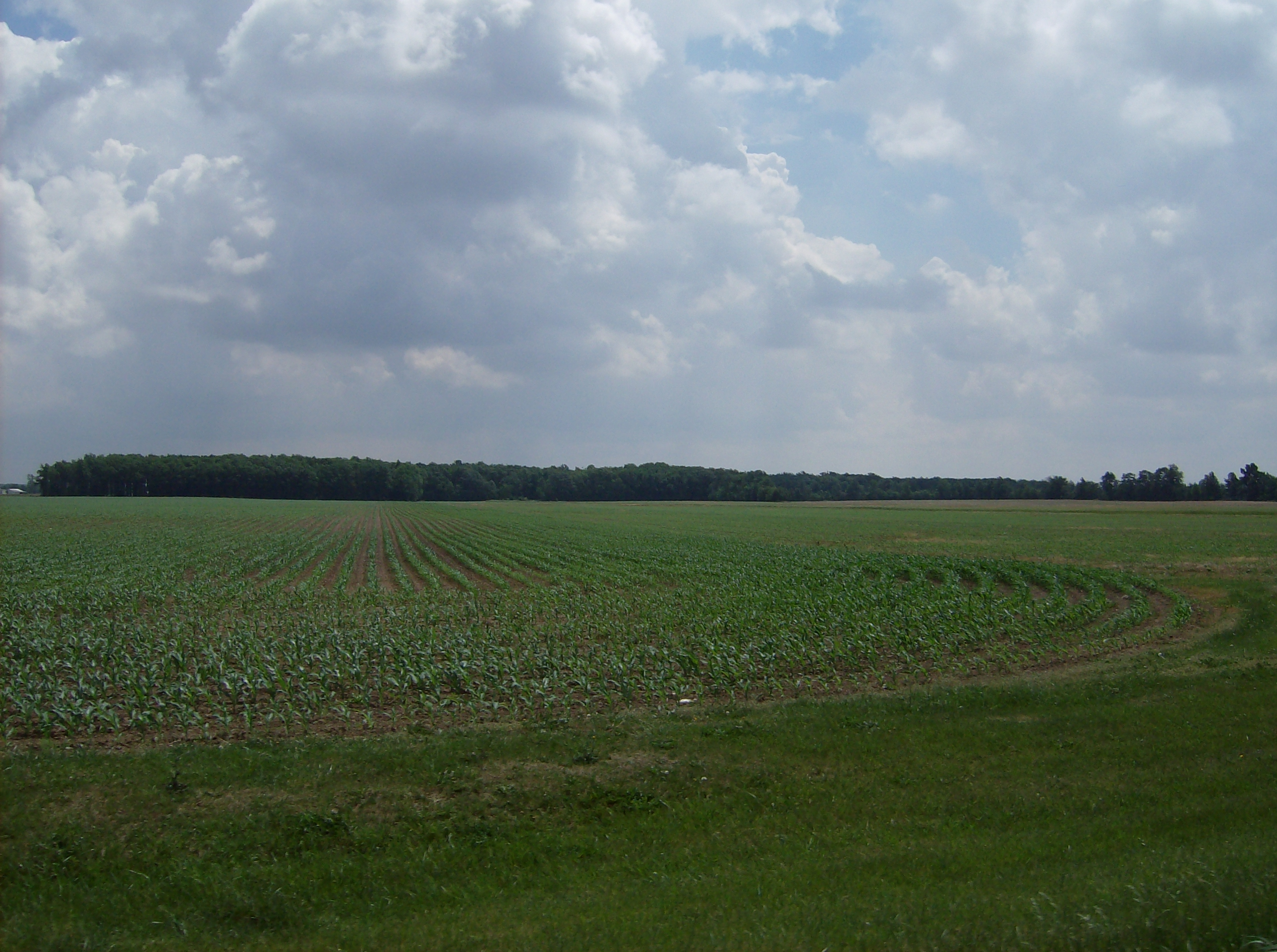
- Farms and woods cover much of Blanchard Township.

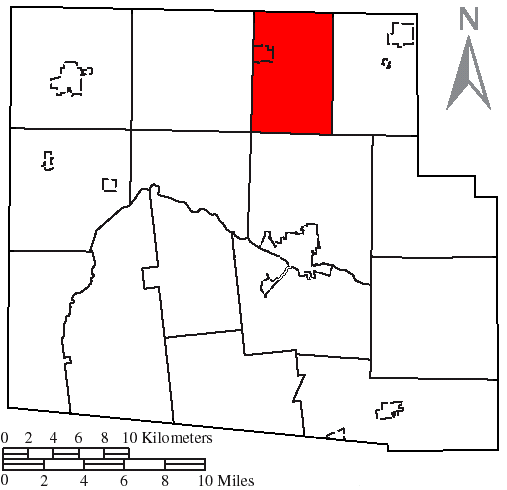
- Location of Blanchard Township, Hardin County, Ohio
- Coordinates: 40°46′50″N 83°37′19″W
- Country: United States
- State: Ohio
- County: Hardin

Area
  - Total: 24.07 sq mi (62.35 km^{2})
  - Land: 24.01 sq mi (62.19 km^{2})
  - Water: 0.062 sq mi (0.16 km^{2})
- Elevation: 912 ft (278 m)

Population (2020)
  - Total: 1,393
  - Density: 58.01/sq mi (22.40/km^{2})
- Time zone: UTC-5 (Eastern (EST))
  - Summer (DST): UTC-4 (EDT)
- FIPS code: 39-06866
- GNIS feature ID: 1086256

Blanchard Township is one of the fifteen townships of Hardin County, Ohio, United States. As of the 2020 census, the population was 1,393.

== Geography ==
Located in the northern part of the county, it borders the following townships:

- Delaware Township, Hancock County - northeast
- Jackson Township - east
- Pleasant Township - south
- Cessna Township - southwest corner
- Washington Township - west
- Madison Township, Hancock County - northwest

The village of Dunkirk is located in northeastern Blanchard Township.

== Name and history ==
Blanchard Township took its name from the Blanchard River. Statewide, other Blanchard Townships are located in Hancock and Putnam counties.

== Government ==
The township is governed by a three-member board of trustees, who are elected in November of odd-numbered years to a four-year term beginning on the following January 1. Two are elected in the year after the presidential election and one is elected in the year before it. There is also an elected township fiscal officer, who serves a four-year term beginning on April 1 of the year after the election, which is held in November of the year before the presidential election. Vacancies in the fiscal officership or on the board of trustees are filled by the remaining trustees.
