= Pleasant Township, Hardin County, Ohio =

Township in Ohio, US

- Township
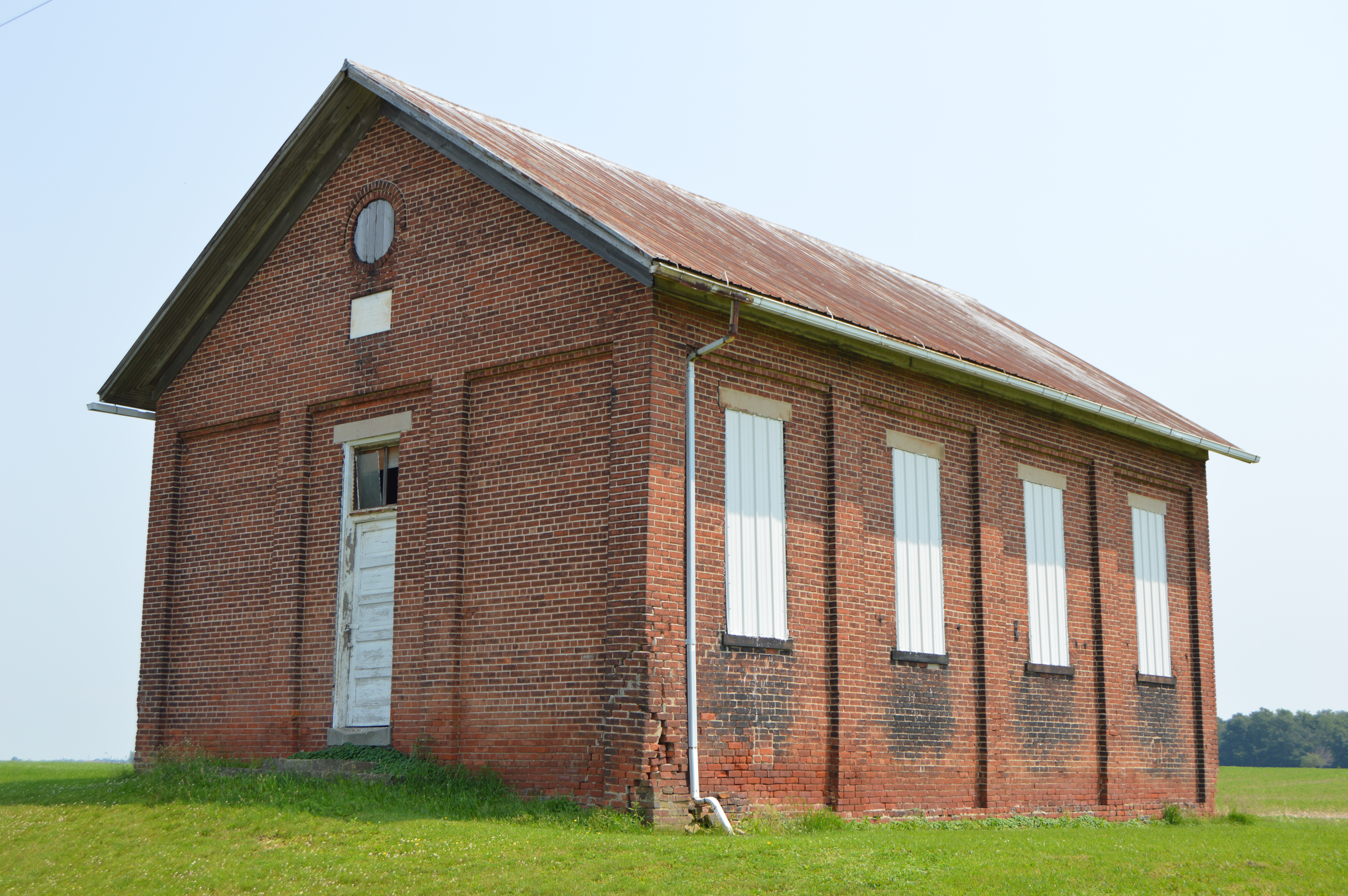
- Former schoolhouse north of Kenton

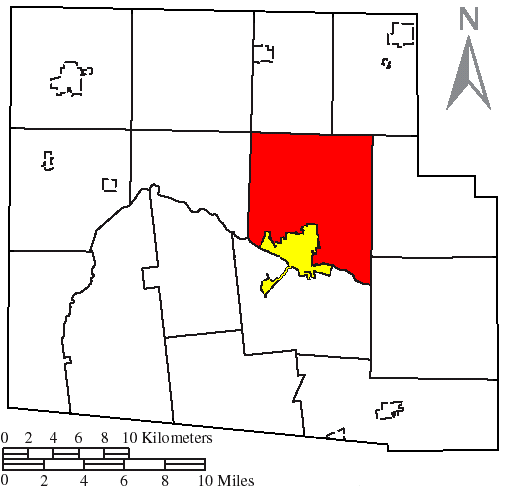
- Location of Pleasant Twp (red), next to the city of Kenton (yellow)
- Coordinates: 40°39′39″N 83°36′13″W
- Country: United States
- State: Ohio
- County: Hardin

Area
  - Total: 38.8 sq mi (100.5 km^{2})
  - Land: 38.8 sq mi (100.5 km^{2})
  - Water: 0 sq mi (0.0 km^{2})
- Elevation: 997 ft (304 m)

Population (2020)
  - Total: 8,037
  - Density: 207.1/sq mi (79.97/km^{2})
- Time zone: UTC-5 (Eastern (EST))
  - Summer (DST): UTC-4 (EDT)
- FIPS code: 39-63282
- GNIS feature ID: 1086267
- Website: https://www.pleasant-township.org/

Pleasant Township is one of the fifteen townships of Hardin County, Ohio, United States. As of the 2020 census the population was 8,037.

== Geography ==
Located in the eastern center of the county, it borders the following townships:

- Blanchard Township - north
- Jackson Township - northeast
- Goshen Township - east
- Dudley Township - southeast
- Buck Township - south
- Cessna Township - west
- Washington Township - northwest corner

Most of the city of Kenton, the county seat of Hardin County, is located in southern Pleasant Township.

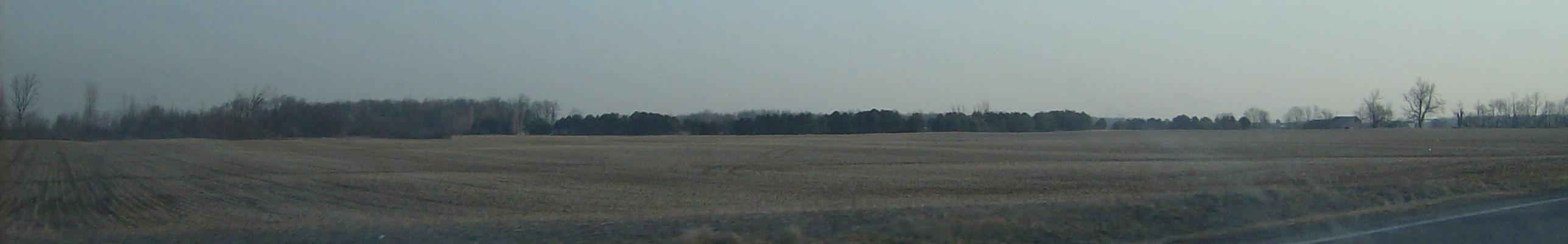
Outside of Kenton, Pleasant Township is generally a flat area of farms and small woods.

== Name and history ==
Pleasant Township was established in 1834. This township was so named on account of its scenery and agriculture. It is one of fifteen Pleasant Townships statewide.

== Government ==
The township is governed by a three-member board of trustees, who are elected in November of odd-numbered years to a four-year term beginning on the following January 1. Two are elected in the year after the presidential election and one is elected in the year before it. There is also an elected township fiscal officer, who serves a four-year term beginning on April 1 of the year after the election, which is held in November of the year before the presidential election. Vacancies in the fiscal officership or on the board of trustees are filled by the remaining trustees.
