= Medical ethnomusicology =

Medical ethnomusicology is a subfield of ethnomusicology. Medical ethnomusicology, similar to medical anthropology, uses music-making, musical sound, and noise to study human health, wellness, healing, and disease prevention integrating biological, psychological, social, emotional, and spiritual realms. Other fields involving the interaction between sound, culture, and health include medical anthropology, medical sociology, music therapy, art therapy, and sound studies.

In 2008, the Society for Ethnomusicology defined medical ethnomusicology as "integrative research and applied practice that explores holistically the roles of music and sound phenomena and related praxes in any cultural and clinical context of health and healing." Medical ethnomusicologists have applied music to autism, Asperger syndrome, dementia, HIV/AIDS, and cognitive therapy.

Medical ethnomusicology blends "anthropological and ethnological, historical and literary techniques" and challenges Western notions of medicine with alternatives such as ethnomedicine. In many cultures, music is regarded as a form of healing, often in conjunction with other practices such as prayer and ritual. Musical ethnomusicology aims to explore their conjunction on a broader cultural scale.

Medical ethnomusicology is a modern field, first emerging into relevance in the 1990s. However, the interrelation of music and healing has been touched upon in past cultural research—for example, in Densmore’s 1918 study of the Teton Sioux. Much research in this field is specific to certain cultures studied, such as Roseman’s focus on the Malaysian Rainforest, Melchor-Barz in Uganda, and Koen in the Pamir Mountains.

One influential piece of writing is “The Oxford Handbook of Medical Ethnomusicology,” written by Benjamin D. Koen, Gregory Barz, and Kenneth Brummel-Smith. This novel was among the first to define the new field and explore its depths. In this book, they define medical ethnomusicology as the “integration of music and sound phenomena” within the “cultural clinical context of health and healing,” and discuss the true meaning of music, medicine, as well as how the two can interact in different settings. It accomplishes three main goals: to elucidate the relationship between health, illness, and disease; to encourage innovative, collaborative research to improve health and healing; and to document the current discourse involving music, culture, and healing.

== Applications ==
=== Nursing home communities ===
Theresa Allison served at a nursing home in 2006–2007, studying the effects of music on the residents of the home. "The Home," as she refers to it in her publications, was rather unusual in that music was of utmost priority: the Home has over 60 hours of music and performing arts activities scheduled weekly, and dozens of residents actively participate in songwriting groups. The Home has produced a professional CD, Island on a Hill, and an award-winning documentary, A 'Specially Wonderful Affair, both in 2002. With such emphasis placed in the arts, Allison concludes that the creation and performance of music has increased the residents' quality of life by allowing them to remain active in their society through songwriting. Songwriting in the Home has fostered a sense of community among the residents and a means of transcending the institution by bringing in memories and experiences from outside their physical space.

=== Spiritual healing ===
Koen's research has also extended into the realm of the spiritual; he analyzed the role of music in maddâh, a form of prayer. Koen believed in music-prayer dynamics, which modeled the dynamic relationship between music, prayer, and healing. Maddâh is unique in that it encompasses all three elements of music-prayer dynamics over the course of a ceremony. Koen describes a maddâh ceremony as such: "during a maddâh ceremony, one experiences music alone, prayer alone, music and prayer combined, and unified music-prayer". In particular, Koen focused on the restorative properties of maddâh as it was utilized in Badakhshan, Tajikistan. Being the economically poorest region of Tajikistan, Badakhshan's culture of health care is precarious at best; there is no running water or plumbing in homes, satisfactory nutrition is hard to come by, and the psychological distress that comes with these factors leads to an abundance of health issues. As a result, maddâh is utilized to maintain health and prevent illness. Koen conducted an experiment of 40 participants from Badakhshan, in which Koen assessed the stress levels of those who participated in a maddâh ceremony using physical indicators of stress such as blood pressure and heart rate. In conclusion, Koen observed an overarching de-stressing effect in those who participated in maddâh, regardless of the role they assumed in the ceremony. Koen attributes this to familiarity: "there was enough familiarity to engage a cultural aesthetic and dynamic that allowed a person's consciousness to approach a flexible state, which here facilitated a state of lower stress". Koen also noted that participants had positive feelings regarding maddâh; many of the participants commented that maddâh relieves them of their emotional burdens.

=== Dementia treatment ===
Treatment of Alzheimer's was historically centered around a biomedical, classically mechanistic model of the disease, but doctors have increasingly taken on a "person-centered" approach, a model through which multiple academic disciplines can contribute to an increased quality of life. Biology, psychology, spirituality, sociology, and most recently, ethnomusicology have all been combined to find the most effective, integrative, complementary, and native interventions for dementia. Carol Prickett provides an overview of the current state of research into music therapy for dementia:

1. Patients with dementia are capable of participating in structured music activities late into the disease.
2. Instrument playing and dance/movement are preferred activities
3. Modeling the patient's expected response increases patient participation
4. Individual and small group settings/sessions are most beneficial
5. Social and emotional skills, including interactions and communications, can be enhanced with music therapy
6. Cognitive skills can be enhanced with music therapy
7. Musical interventions can be an alternative to pharmacological or physical restraints

In 2008, Kenneth Brummel-Smith studied the state of care for those with Alzheimer's disease (AD) and found care to be largely unsatisfactory. Rather, Brummel-Smith looks toward music as the cure to Alzheimer's disease; he observes that nursing home residents with AD are capable of participating in structured music activities late into the disease, and that music can be used to enhance social, emotional, and cognitive skills in those with AD. Brummel-Smith calls for a more interdisciplinary approach to combatting AD, which may include music therapy if it may be suitable for a given AD patient.

In 2017, Bill Ahessy presented a music therapy case study about a 94-year-old woman with AD who participated in improvisation and song writing for 18 months, suggesting that person-centered therapy and music therapy theory and practice share valuable links and identifying song-writing as a powerful therapeutic technique for AD treatment. For the patient in the case study, music therapy helped with reminiscence and emotional self-expression, and assisted the client with experiencing herself in new ways to process her condition. Specifically, music helped her strengthen and validate her identify, verbalize her emotions, and reflect on her experience with AD.

=== HIV/AIDS treatment ===
Kathleen Van Buren conducted fieldwork in Nairobi and Sheffield with the purpose of enacting positive change in the context of HIV and AIDS in each environment. Van Buren speaks about utilizing music as an agent of social change; in Nairobi, she witnessed individuals and organizing drawing upon music and the arts to promote social change within their respective communities. In Sheffield, Van Buren offered a new class on "Music and Health" at the University of Sheffield as well as World AIDS Day event with the theme "Hope through the Arts". After the conclusion of these events, Van Buren published her findings and offered a to-do list for the ethnomusicology of HIV and AIDS. Namely, she urged ethnomusicologists to research and engage with the music community in order to facilitate the development of educational and therapy programs to further the fight against AIDS.

Gregory Barz also investigates the usage of music in healing individuals with HIV/AIDS in Sub-saharan African communities like Uganda, where only 10% of the population has access to medical facilities, and there is only one doctor for every 20,000 people. In Uganda, less than 2% of those who need antiretroviral drugs can afford them. He concludes that music's contributions to HIV/AIDS intervention and palliative care are a valuable, human, and imperative option to shaping the treatment landscape for these individuals. Through participation in music, socioeconomic effects of illness are reduced by supporting caregivers, controlling pain, and providing counseling to caretakers and sick individuals.

Barz notes that one of the primary ways that music can play a role in the treatment of HIV/AIDS is through performances that help educate the listeners about the disease and make it easier for them to understand, interact with, and reconcile the role that HIV/AIDS plays in their lives. For example, Walya Sulaiman is a musical activist who lives with HIV; since his diagnosis, he has dedicated his life to educating and counseling other Igangan Muslims. There is often a communication barrier between doctors who understand the biological mechanisms behind HIV/AIDS and village people, who might not have as firm of a grasp on the implications of the disease. Therefore, in musical performances meant to educate his target groups about the affliction, Sulaiman uses the term kayovu, which is an insect that eats bananas from the inside out, to depict AIDS, and ene, which is jackfruit, to facilitate an understanding about how one can get stuck in the syrupy fruit, unable to wash or scrape HIV away. Thus, these linguistic localizations help facilitate a deeper, culturally relevant understanding of HIV/AIDS.

=== Autism-related therapy ===
Michael Bakan, professor of ethnomusicology and Florida State University, has spearheaded research efforts to apply ethnomusicology to autism, and conceptually sees the practice as a form of applied ethnomusicology. He sees the ethnomusicology of autism as in the same realm as other similar epistemological frameworks related to the condition, including the autistic self-advocacy and neurodiversity movements, disability studies, and the anthropology of autism. In his research and publications, he utilizes a polyvocal narrative approach by splicing his words and ideas with the children on the autism spectrum who he plays and listens to music with. He also integrates the ideologies of spokespeople from the autistic self-advocacy movement, and scholars, scientists, and disability rights advocates who represent a broad range of positions and epistemic schools of thought. He ultimately proposes an ethnographic model of disability as a complementary alternative to existing socio-medical models, further arguing that the ethnographic and relativistic principles of applied ethnomusicology can effectively promote neurodiversity and autism acceptance.

An example of music used in the treatment of autism is the Music-Play Project (MPP). The MPP was inspired by an interaction in which Benjamin Koen and Michael Bakan invited their families to eat dinner together. After dinner, Koen and Bakan took out some drums and started playing music together. Mark, a 3-year-old member of the Bakan family who has Asperger's syndrome, began engaging with the music in a way that Koen describes as "miraculous". Bakan describes Mark's experience as a "remarkable and positive behavioral/emotional transformation in him". After that moment, Koen and Bakan began hosting a six-week program in which three children, accompanied by their parents, engage in freeform improvisational music creation alongside Koen and Bakan. Participants play on gamelan gongs, metallophones, and drums, which are chosen for providing rewarding sounds with minimal technique and effort from the participants. Koen and Bakan recount that the Music-Play Project has proven successful in providing children with key experiences that are particularly important in development, including forming new friendships among participants and facilitating fresh interactions between children and their parents.

=== Cognitive therapy ===
The Flexibility Hypothesis

The flexibility hypothesis posits that the mechanism behind many forms of healing and psychotherapy is the induction of positive psychological states marked by flexibility or an enhanced ability to move and shift between different cognitive sets. This hypothesis mentions that music can act as a tool, or primer, to facilitate the patient's receptibility to moving across cognitive states. These different cognitive sets can be reached by the patient by altering expectations, remoralization, and instilling hope in the present and the future, with help from different primers.

Healing practices use specific symbolic interventions called "flexibility primers;" these can help induce different degrees and states of cognitive and emotional flexibility. Flexibility primers can take different forms, including metaphors, images, and music and other media, which is how the flexibility hypothesis falls within the realm of medical ethnomusicology. Music is often used to prime the patients to represent, elicity, and enact cognitive and emotional flexibility in rituals of healing. Within this practice, to truly reach the patient, it is imperative to identify psychological processes and cultural forms that facilitate and evoke cognitive and emotional flexibility to understand the cultural specificity and potential efficacy of a particular set of primers. For example, when choosing music for this ritual, it might be in one's best interest to use cultural context to match the patient with a primer that they will be particularly receptive to, through language, style, etc. Because cultural specificity is highly correlated with the potential efficacy of different healing practices, we can use cultural context to guide intervention/healing design to best promote well-being.

Rhythmic Drumming

There has been debate since the early 1950s among anthropologists and ethnomusicologists about the extent to which different psychological and socio-environmental factors play into the induction of trance states in different ritual contexts. The debate has been focused around the question: Can music (alone or in context) induce trance? Gilbert Rouget, an anthropologist, is a primary player in this debate; his 1980 book "Music and Trance: A Theory of Relations between Music and Possession" explores ritual trances involving music and reviews the anthropological literature on the neurophysiological effects of drumming and other repetitive auditory stimulation. Another researcher in this debate is Andrew Neher, who conducted laboratory studies about auditory driving, which is the ability of repetitive rhythmic auditory stimuli to alter brainwave activity in a one-to-one relationship. He found that if a subject hears drum rhythms at 8 beats/second, one's brainwaves will be influenced by this stimulus, producing more activity at 8 Hz and also influencing other brainwave frequency bands to alter brain activity as a whole.

Many researchers have also found that drumming can have mood-altering effects on the brain and nervous system. This research has been applied to developing treatments for a range of physical conditions, mental illnesses, and personality disorders. Bittman et al. discovered that rhythmic auditory stimulation can improve immune function and increase relaxation, improve mood, and help manage stress, Maurer et al. found that drumming or hearing music where the predominant focus is on drum beats can help enhance hypnotic susceptibility, and Mandel et al. suggested that rhythmic stimulation can induce altered states of consciousness for psychotherapy. Additionally, many modern physiological reports on the effects of sustained rhythmic drumming reinforce that the act of drumming can help alter affective states and induce states of consciousness, hypnosis, and meditation through the diversion of attention to consistent patterns, as well as brainwave synchronization and entrainment.
