= Ethnomusicology =

Study of the cultural aspects of music

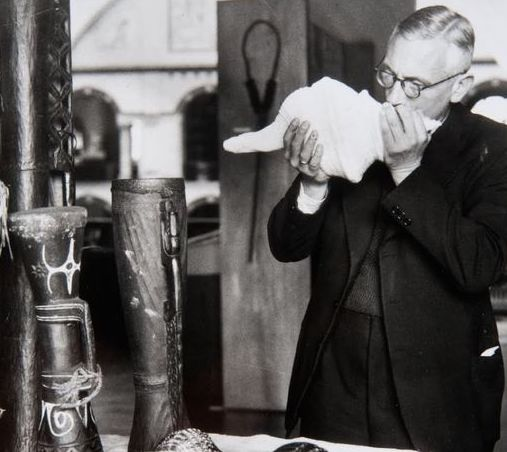
Jaap Kunst, early ethnomusicologist and creator of the term 'ethno-musicology', plays the Indonesian triton, next to other traditional Indonesian instruments.

Ethnomusicology is the multidisciplinary study of music in its cultural context. The discipline investigates social, cognitive, biological, comparative, and other dimensions. Ethnomusicologists study music as a reflection of culture and investigate the act of music-making through various immersive, observational, and analytical approaches. This discipline emerged from comparative musicology, initially focusing on non-Western music, but later expanded to embrace the study of all different music.

The practice of ethnomusicology relies on direct engagement and performance, as well as academic work. Fieldwork takes place among those who make the music, engaging local languages and culture as well as music. Ethnomusicologists can become participant observers, learning to perform the music they are studying. Fieldworkers also collect recordings and contextual data.

== Definition ==
Ethnomusicology combines perspectives from folklore, psychology, cultural anthropology, linguistics, comparative musicology, music theory, and history. This resulted in various definitions. In 1956, American ethnomusicologist Willard Rhodes called it a theoretical and empirical study amalgamating musicology and anthropology. as well as explaining and emphasizing if it were to be seen and "interpreted" in its "broadest sense" it would be seen as "the total music of humankind, without limitations of time and space." Which he captures and emphasizes more of ethnomusicology's double concept between this anthropology aspect and a musicology aspect. In 1992, Jeff Todd Titon summarized ethnomusicology as the study of "people making music": people make the sounds called music, and people also make music into a cultural domain, with associated ideas, activities, and material culture.

The word is a portmanteau of 'ethno' (people), and 'musicology' (study of music).

Typical definitions include elements such as a holistic approach, cultural context, music theory, sonic, and historical perspectives. In other words, ethnomusicology is the study of music as a social and cultural phenomenon. Alan P. Merriam defined ethnomusicology as the study of "music as culture," and offered four goals of ethnomusicology:

- help protect and explain non-Western music;
- save "folk" music before it disappears in the modern world;
- study music as a means of communication to further world understanding;
- provide an avenue for wider exploration and reflection for those interested.

The term informant is used for those whom fieldworkers observe, members of the community under study. Informants may or may not represent an entire musical culture, or the ideal of that culture. More recently, ethnomusicologists have preferred terms like "consultant" to "informant," while "primitive" has been replaced with "Indigenous."

Matt Sakakeeny observed that ethnomusicology since the 1980s has focused increasingly on politics.

Scholars such as Willard Rhodes were one of a majority who argued that the field of ethnomusicology should mainly be defined as a field that explores all musical communities, as well as situating styles and practices with their cultural and social contexts. Throughout Rhodes's time period, he helped capture the definition of ethnomusicology during that time: a scientific discipline that holds on to the humanity aspect it has through the lives of communities.

== History ==
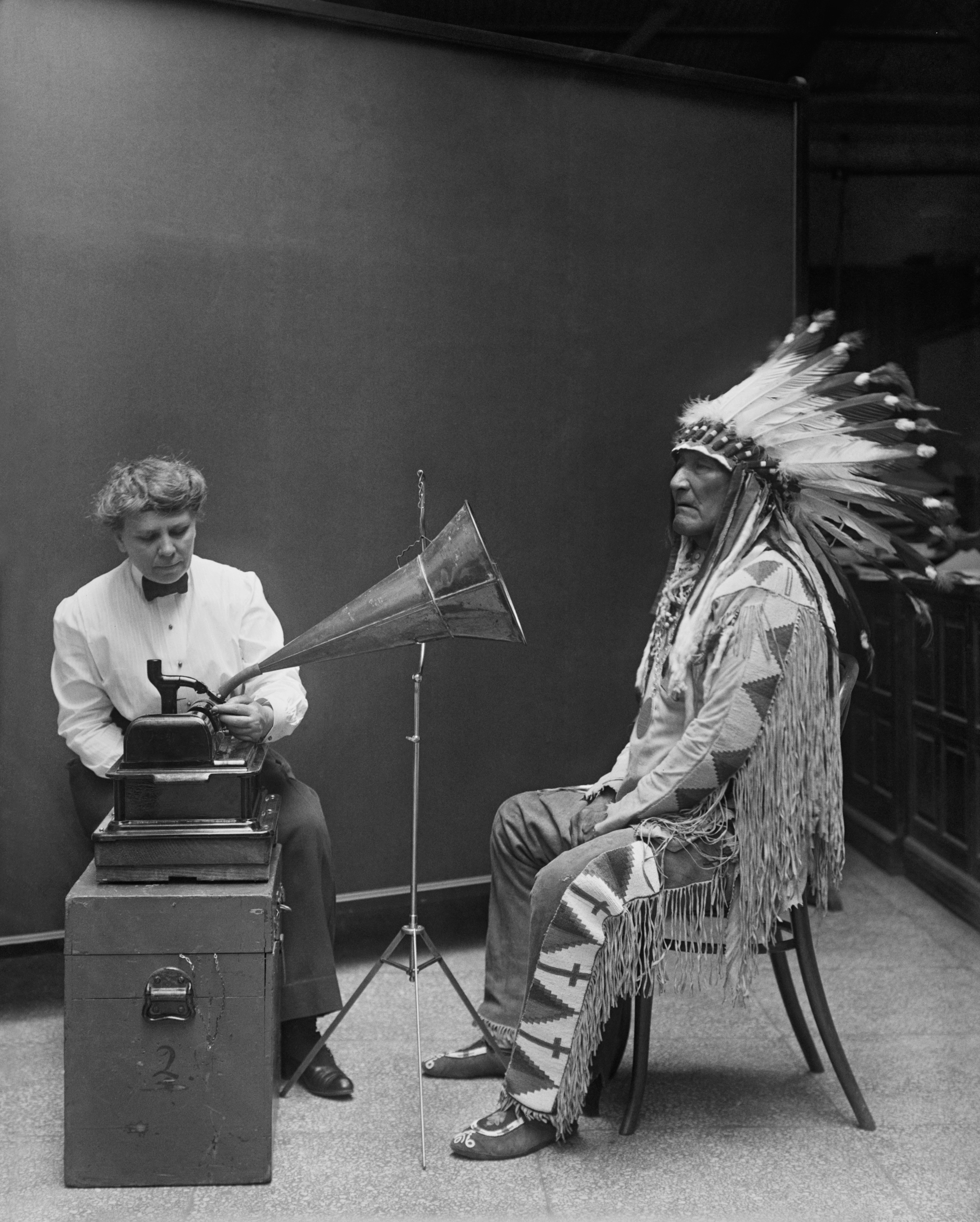
Frances Densmore at the Smithsonian Institution in 1916 where she was recording Blackfoot chief Mountain Chief for the Bureau of American Ethnology. In this picture, Mountain Chief is listening to a recording.

The history of ethnomusicology describes the evolution of the discipline of ethnomusicology, which integrates the cultural and social roles and influences of the people who make it. Oskar Kolberg is one of the earliest ethnomusicologists who began by collecting Polish folk songs in 1839. Comparative musicology, the primary precursor to ethnomusicology, emerged in the late 19th century and early 20th century. The International Musical Society in Berlin in 1899 acted as one of the first centers for ethnomusicology. Comparative musicology and early ethnomusicology tended to focus on non-Western music, but later, the field expanded to embrace Western music.

When ethnomusicology first emerged in Western academic circles, its focus was primarily on non-Western music. This often neglected European and Western musical traditions, creating a contrast with conventional musicology, which centered on Western art music. This approach led to criticism for imposing Western biases on non-Western music, which prompted scholars to shift from "comparative musicology" to "ethnomusicology" in the 1950s. The new term aimed to emphasize a descriptive, culture-sensitive approach that respected each musical tradition on its own terms.

Over time, the scope of ethnomusicology broadened to encompass the study of music from all cultural contexts, including Western traditions. Pioneering figures like Alan Merriam and David McAllester emphasized that music should be understood as a form of human behavior and expression rather than solely as an object of analysis. This reflects a more human-centric approach, where music is seen as both an art form and a social and a cultural phenomenon deeply connected to identity, tradition, and daily life. This perspective rejected confined distinctions between “Western” and “non-Western” music and encouraged analysis grounded in the lived experiences of the communities studied. Later writers, including Charles Seeger and Steven Feld, extended this approach by emphasizing performance, embodiment, and the situated meanings of sound within cultural life.

Folklorists, who began preserving and studying folklore music in Europe and the US in the 19th century, are considered the precursors of the field prior to the Second World War. Oskar Kolberg is regarded as one of the earliest European ethnomusicologists as he first began collecting Polish folk songs in 1839. The International Musical Society in Berlin in 1899 acted as one of the first centers for ethnomusicology.

== Approaches ==
Ethnomusicologists apply theories and methods from other social science disciplines such as cultural anthropology, cultural studies, and sociology. While some researchers primarily conduct historical studies, the majority practice long-term participant observation. Ethnomusicological work brings intensive ethnographic methods to the study of music. Two approaches are common: anthropological and musicological. Those using the anthropological approach study how culture affects music. Seeger differentiated the two approaches, describing the anthropology of music as attempting understand music as a part of culture and social life, while musical anthropology considers social life as a performance.

Alan P. Merriam and Mantle Hood expanded on Seeger's framework and sought to integrate culture in the study of music. Merriam built upon the foundation of the anthropology of music by defining ethnomusicology as "the study of music as culture", emphasizing that scholars should analyze not only sound but the social behavior and meaning surrounding musical practice. Hood advocated for more of a musicological approach to ethnomusicology, arguing that researchers should learn to perform the music they study to understand it from within the culture's own system of knowledge, a concept he called "bi-musicality".

=== Anthropological ===
Anthropological ethnomusicologists stress the importance of fieldwork and using participant observation in order to study music as culture. This can include a variety of fieldwork practices, including personal exposure to a performance tradition or musical technique, participation in a native ensemble, or inclusion in social customs. In the past, local musical transcription was required to study music globally, due to the lack of recording technology. This approach emphasizes the cultural impact of music and how music can be used to further understand humanity.

=== Musicological ===
Those who practice a musicological approach study both musical structure and relationships between music and culture, often comparatively. In practice, this involves learning to perform the music under study. This is intended to combat ethnocentrism and transcend Western analytical conventions.

== Analysis ==
=== Top-down vs bottom-up ===
Analytical and research methods have changed over time, taking two primary paths. Top-down, deductive analysis looks for musical universals that apply across cultures. Implicit in such an approach is that analysts must be aware of any cultural frames that underlie analytical methodologies. By contrast, some scholars adopt subjective, inductive, bottom-up methodologies tailored to a specific music and culture.

=== Methodologies ===
Ethnomusicology has yet to establish standards for analysis, despite efforts by analysts such as Kolinski, Béla Bartók, and von Hornbostel.

The cent as a unit of pitch provides a fixed numerical representation for intervals, independent of its specific pitch level. This allowed precise comparisons of music that used different, often individual- or culture-specific, pitch systems. Pitch systems in countries such as India, Japan, and China vary "not only [in] the absolute pitch of each note, but also necessarily the intervals between them". He concluded that the real pitch of a musical scale can only be determined when "heard as played by a native musician" and even then, "obtain that particular musician's tuning".

Alan Lomax's method of cantometrics analyzes songs to examine human behavior in different cultures. He cited a correlation between musical traits and culture. Cantometrics involves qualitative scoring based on song characteristics.

Kolinski used the distance between the initial and final tones in melodic patterns to reject the early binary of European and non-European and refuted von Hornbostel's hypothesis that European music generally had ascending melodic lines, while other music featured descending melodic lines.

Feld conducted descriptive ethnographic studies treating "sound as a cultural system" in his studies of Kaluli people, instead opting for sociomusical methods.

== Fieldwork ==
Fieldwork involves observing music where it is created and performed. Ethnomusicological fieldwork differs from anthropological fieldwork because it requires gathering detailed information about the mechanics of music production, including recording, filming, and written material. Ethnomusicological fieldwork involves gathering musical data, experience, texts (e.g. songs, tales, myths, proverbs), and information on social structures. Ethnomusicological fieldwork principally involves social interaction and requires establishing personal relationships.

Music appears in a given culture at multiple levels, from informal to elite. E.g., ethnomusicology can focus on music from informal groups, on the Beatles, or ignore such distinctions as biased.

=== History ===
From the 19th century through the mid-20th century, folklorists, ethnographers, and early ethnomusicologists attempted to preserve disappearing music cultures. They collected transcriptions or audio recordings on wax cylinders. Many recordings were archived at the Berliner Phonogramm-Archiv at the Berlin school of comparative musicology. These recordings formed the foundation of ethnomusicology.

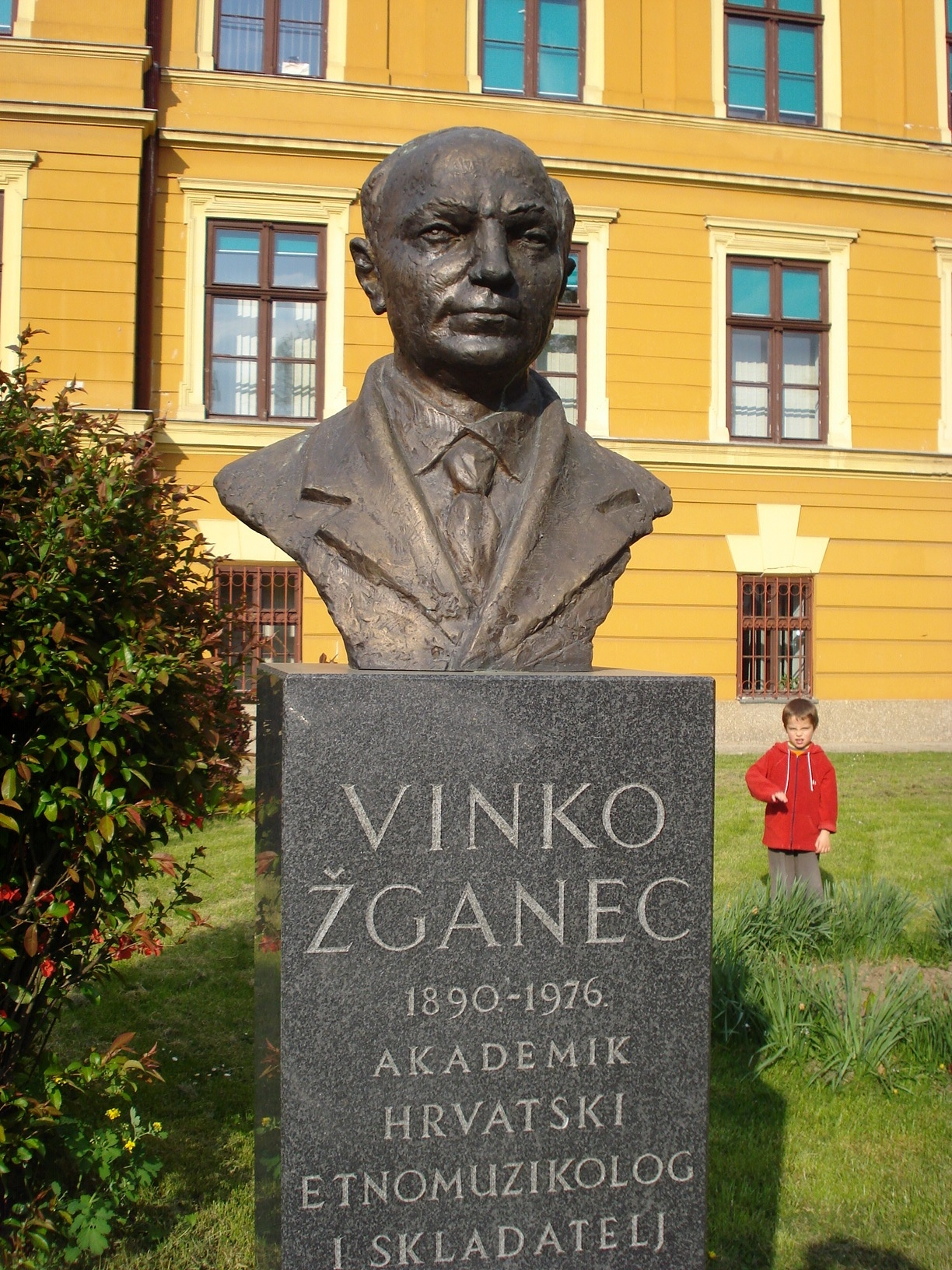
Vinko Žganec, a Croatian researcher, did most of his fieldwork in Međimurje County.

Ethnomusicology transitioned from analysis of scores and recording to fieldwork following World War II.

Early fieldwork included transcriptions of Hungarian folk music transcribed by Vikar Béla, Zoltán Kodály, and Lászo Lajtha.

In the 1930s James Mooney for the Bureau of American Ethnology; Natalie Curtis, and Alice C. Fletcher were in the field to transcribe Ghost Dance songs that were part of various Native American belief systems.

McAllester conducted a pioneering fieldwork study of Navajo music study, particularly the music of the Enemy Way ceremony. He sought to identify Navajo cultural values based on analysis of attitudes toward music. McAllester used a questionnaire that included items such as:

- Some people beat a drum when they sing; what other things are used like that?
- What did people say when you learned how to sing?
- Are there different ways of making the voice sound when we sing?
- Are there songs that sound especially pretty?
- What kind of melody do you like better: (illustrate with a chant-like melody and a more varied one).
- Are there songs for men only? [for women only? for children only?]

Merriam and later Nettl criticized the quality of contemporary fieldwork as thoughtlessly gathering musical sound. Between 1920 and 1960 fieldworkers began to move beyond collection to mapping entire musical systems from the field. After the 1950s, some began to participate with local musicians.

Merriam listed several areas of fieldwork inquiry:

- Musical material culture: classification and cultural perception of musical instruments
- Song texts
- Categories of music as defined by locals
- Musician training, opportunity, and perceptions by others
- Uses and functions of music in relation to other cultural practices
- Music sources

In the 1970s Hood was learning from Indonesian musicians about sléndro scales, and to play the rebab. By the 1980s, the participant-observer methodology became the norm, at least in the North American tradition of ethnomusicology.

Ethical concerns became more prominent in the 1970s, seeking to protect performers' rights by, e.g., obtaining informed permission to make recordings, according to the conventions of the host society. Ethics also requires the observer to show respect for the host culture, e.g., by avoiding ethnocentric remarks. Seeger interpreted this to rule out exploring how singing came to exist within Suyá culture, instead examining how singing creates culture, and how social life can be seen through musical and performative lenses.

=== Objectivity ===
The question of whether a standard approach to fieldwork is possible/beneficial recapitulated similar discussions about ethnomusicology and other fields. Various authors pushed or rejected efforts to systematize practice.

Ethnomusicology relies on both data and personal relationships, which often cannot be quantified by statistical data. It tends to emphasize the third of Malinowski's categories of anthropological data (texts, structures, and imponderables of everyday life). This is because it captures the ambiguity of experience that cannot be captured well through writing.

Merriam in 1964 characterized ethnomusicological fieldwork as primarily concerned with the collection of facts. He advocated a combination of standardized and more free-form approaches.

In 1994 Rice rejected the possibility of objective perception. Relying on Heidegger, Gadamer, and Ricoeur, he claimed that human perception is inherently subjective because humans interpret perceptions only through symbols. Preconceptions influence the way these symbols are interpreted. Rice equated musicology to objectivity and musical experience to subjectivity. He claimed that experience of music was only an interpretation of preconceived symbols, and thus subjective. Thus, chasing objectivity by systematizing fieldwork is futile. Instead, Rice asserted that engaging with someone else's musical experience is impossible, confining fieldwork to individual analysis.

Barz and Cooley claimed that fieldwork is always personal because in ethnomusicology, unlike the natural sciences, becomes a participant in the group they are researching just by their presence. To illustrate the disparity between those participatory experiences and what typically gets published, they distinguish field research, which attempts to characterize reality from field notes which record perceptions and are often omitted from published work.

=== Performance ===
It is generally accepted that errors in performance give insight into perception of a music's structure, but these studies are restricted to Western score-reading tradition thus far.

=== Best practices ===
Later researchers paid greater attention to ensuring that their fieldwork provided a holistic sense of the culture under study.

The majority of ethnomusicologists are Westerners, including those who study non-Western music. This opened them to the criticism that wealthy, white individuals were taking advantage of their privilege and resources to dominate the discipline. Researchers responded by attempting to change the perception that they were exploiting less economically advanced communities, treating musicians as test subjects, and then publishing dismissive reports about them. This critique may extend to non-Western local researchers studying their home country. For example, a Nigerian Yoruba may be perceived as an outsider by Nigerian Hausa.

Over time, more researchers from other cultures began to examine Western music and societies, at once easing the earlier concerns, while possibly presenting similar issues in reverse.

One way to bridge gaps in perspective is by conducting long-term, residential studies, often for more than one year. In 1927 Herzog recorded several hundred songs over a two-month stay, establishing a precedent for extending fieldwork. Working with Blackfoot people, Nettl evolved from seeking out ostensibly representative singers to deciding that the community was non-homogeneous, requiring each singer to be understood on their own terms.

== Theoretical issues ==
=== Universals ===
Musicologists have long pondered the question of universals in music. Longfellow wrote that music is the universal language of mankind. However, scholars have yet to identify characteristics that all music has in common, much less universals in the way that humans hear and understand it. Universals would allow all music to be characterized accordingly.

The search for universal traits was characteristic of nineteenth-century musicology.Most musicians and some teachers believed that music was a universal language. Musicologists tried to prove propositions such as that all 'primitive' peoples have monophonic singing and use intervals. Scholarship at the time was limited to European music and treated all other as (possibly distant) relatives.

Ethnomusicologists initially questioned the possibility of universals because they were searching for an approach to explain music that differed from Guido Adler's. The realization that culture has an important role in shaping aesthetic responses to music sparked controversy, with debates questioning e.g., what people consider music, and whether perceptions of consonance and dissonance have a biological or cultural basis.

By the 1990s the notion of universals was popular, but not...universal. Seeger, for instance, categorized his interpretation of musical universals by using Venn diagrams to organize five universal qualities. Harwood claimed that looking for causality relationships and "deep structure" (as advanced by Chomsky) was a fruitless way to look for universals. Nettl asserted that music is particular, not universal, because culture's influence produced so diverse. He qualified this by saying that types of music are not as mutually unintelligible as human languages, preferring the term dialect rather than language. He opined that the ways in which people sing and play bear significant similarities. List and McAllester also denied the existence of musical universals.

Eventually, the search retreated from universals to near-universals. McAllester suggested qualities such as tonal center, a course, an ending, and the ability to stimulate feelings, performers, music's ability to generate out of body experience, religion, and sex. In response, Wachsmann countered that even near-universals were oversimplifications. Wachsmann claimed that mere resemblance may be how people distinguish music from other things. He attempted to create an amalgam of relations for sound and psyche:

- the sounds' physical properties
- the physiological response to the sound
- the perception of sounds as selected by the human mind based on previous experiences,
- the response to transient environmental pressures.

Harwood approached the question of universality from a psychological perspective. He claimed that universals in music are basic human cognitive and social processes. He called this an "information processing approach" and considered music as an auditory stimulus that affects the human perceptual and cognitive system. This implies that stimuli that do not produce such effects do not qualify as music.

List stated that since music is not the sole producer of heightened experience (which applies equally well to other arts), it therefore cannot be a music universal. Nettl disputed this logic, saying that lack of exclusivity does not mean that a trait is not universal.

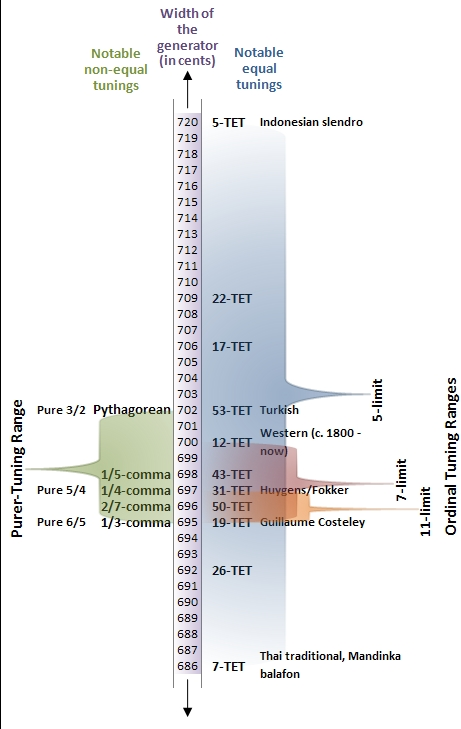
Note the number of Western and non-Western tunings that occur within the valid tuning range of the syntonic temperament.

=== Linguistics and semiotics ===
In 1949, anthropologist Leslie White wrote, "the symbol is the basic unit of all human behavior and civilization", and that use of symbols is a distinguishing human characteristic. As symbolism became the core of anthropology, scholars sought to examine music as a system of signs or symbols, birthing musical semiotics. Nettl related ethnomusicology to semiotics, encompassing the culturally dependent, listener-derived meanings attributed to music.

In the 1970s Seeger and semiotician Nattiez proposed repurposing methodology employed in linguistics as a way to study music. This approach was influenced by de Saussure, Peirce, and Lévi-Strauss among others. Alton and Judith Becker theorized the existence of musical "grammars" in their studies of Javanese gamelan music, agreeing that resemblance to language made semiotic study possible. Nattiez classified the study of music as a humanity rather than a science and taking a linguistic approach.

Blacking sought a parallel to linguistic analysis in his Cultural Analysis of Music, a grammar that could generate all possible music. Like Nattiez, he saw a universal grammar as essential. He felt that ethnomusicology was merely the overlap of anthropology and music. He urged others to consider non-musical processes that occur in the making of music.

Some musics have been cited as more suited to linguistic analysis than others. Indian music, for example, has been linked directly to language. Critics of musical semiotics and linguistic-based analytical systems, such as Feld, argue that music only bears significant similarity to language in certain cultures and that linguistic analysis potentially ignores cultural context.

=== Comparative research ===
Some research features comparisons across cultures. Beginning in the late 60s, comparative ethnomusicologists typically used Lomax's cantometrics. Some cantometric measurements are relatively reliable, such as wordiness, while others are less so, such as precision of enunciation.

Feld made pairwise comparisons about competence, form, performance, environment, theory, and value/equality. Nettl noted in 2003 that comparative study had fallen in and out of style, pointing out that whatever its validity, it attracts criticism over alleged ethnocentrism. In the 21st century, scientists such as Patrick E. Savage and Steven Brown have revived comparative approaches and proposed a "new comparative musicology".

=== Insider/outsider epistemology ===
Wachsmann claimed that each genre communicates to the members of its in-group only. List concurred that music possesses significance only to the in-group.

The relevance and implications of insider and outsider distinctions been a subject of debate over the qualifications needed to research the music of a specific culture. Must the researcher be a member of that culture? If not, what rules apply? Ethnomusicology began with largely Western researchers examining other cultures, often concluding it to be inferior to Western music. This led musicians in host cultures to object to such researchers, for their inability to escape their preconceptions.Nettl wrote about three views common in host cultures:

- The intentions of Western ethnomusicologists are not to understand other music in its own terms, but to compare it to Western music.
- Western ethnomusicologists want to apply their own methodologies, which are not appropriate for local music.
- Ethnomusicologists ignore local subtleties.

Another potential issue comes from the common practice of conducting extended fieldwork, in which an outside researcher attempts to immerse themselves in a host culture. One concern is whether this costs more in lost objectivity than it gains from familiarity.

Nettl asserted a binary that roughly equates to Western and non-Western. He advocated collaborating with native experts as a best of both worlds approach to combating ethnocentrism. He proposed using categories defined by the host culture to bring the outsider some insider insight.

The position of ethnomusicologists as outsiders looking in on a music culture, was discussed in Said's theory of Orientalism. Said claimed that Westerners are trapped in an imagined or romanticized view of "the Other". According to Nettl, three beliefs of insiders and members of the host culture lead to adverse results:

- "Ethnomusicologists come to compare non-Western musics or other "other" traditions to their own... in order to show that the outsider's own music is superior",
- "Ethnomusicologists want to use their own approaches to non-Western music;
- "They come with the assumption that there is such a thing as African or Asian or American Indigenous music, disregarding boundaries obvious to the host."

He argued that ethnomusicologists had successfully purged orientalist approaches. He analyzed the notion of insider, using geographic, social, and economic factors that distinguish insiders from outsiders. Nettl disputed the notion of the native as the eternal other and the outsider as a westerner by default. He noted that some researchers of "more industrialized African and Asian nations" also see themselves as outsiders in regard to their own rural communities.

As an outsider trying to learn Bulgarian music, Rice worked to adopt a Bulgarian perspective. Although the Bulgarian people said that he learned well, he admitted that "areas of the tradition (...) elude my understanding and explanation. (...) Some sort of culturally sensitive understanding (...) will be necessary to close this gap." He stated that the world is constructed with preexisting symbols that distort understanding. He rejected objectivity and that an outside researcher could understand music as a native would. Rice noted that his "understanding passed through language and verbal cognitive categories" whereas the Bulgarian instrumental tradition lacked "verbal markers and descriptors of melodic form", complicating communications.

Kingsbury asked whether it is possible to study music even as an actual insider. He applied fieldwork techniques to study an American music conservatory, attempting to act as an outsider, doing his best to repress his experience and knowledge of American conservatory culture. He analyzed conservatory conventions that he might otherwise have overlooked, such as the way announcements are disseminated, to make cultural assertions. For example, he concluded that the institutional structure of the conservatory was highly decentralized. Based on professors' absences, he questioned the conservatory's commitment to certain subjects. His four main observations:

- high premium on teacher individuality,
- teachers' role as nodal reinforces a patron-client-like system of social organization,
- enforcement of the aural traditions of musical literacy,
- conflict between the client/patron structure and the school's administrative structure.

In 1997, Kingsbury argued that the discipline continued to be weakened by ethnocentrism.

=== Ethics ===
Ethical concerns in fieldwork must inform interactions between researchers and those with whom they interact. Ethically, each party must be comfortable with the process and ensure that all parties are compensated fairly. In particular, complete permission must be obtained from performer(s) under study, while the music-related rights and obligations in the host society must be respected.

Ethnocentrism (judging one culture by the standards of another) is another hazard. Ethnomusicology attempts to understand the music of each culture in its own terms and not subjecting informants/participants to invidious comparisons.

Slobin claimed that ethics discussions are founded on several assumptions:

- "Ethics is largely an issue for 'Western' scholars working in 'non-Western' societies";
- "Most ethical concerns arise from interpersonal relations between scholar and 'informant' as a consequence of fieldwork";
- "Ethics is situated within...the declared purpose of the researcher: the increase of knowledge in the ultimate service of human welfare.";
- "Discussion of ethical issues proceeds from values of Western culture."

Slobin observed that ethics varies across nations and cultures, and that the ethics from the cultures of both researcher and informant must be accommodated in fieldwork settings. Some scenarios are ethically ambiguous, such as:

- Whether a rare musical instrument should be preserved in a museum or left in its native culture to be played, but not necessarily preserved.
- Video recordings may require consent from the subjects and may require the producers' presence to address questions from viewers.
- Appropriately dividing the proceeds and other benefits from a musical production.
- Whether to censor factual negative information about a subject.
- Whether to censor a musician who wants to perform something that the researcher believes inappropriately represents local culture

Many ethical rules established by Westerners apply to Westerners studying in non-Western countries. These may not apply to researchers studying their own culture, beyond relations between researcher and informant. However, indigenous researchers face many of the same ethical risks.

While copyright law is the primary method of protecting artistic works in Western society, other protection|s may be required for non-Western works, because their origin in oral tradition may not qualify them for copyright. Furthermore non-Western artists may lack familiarity with copyright law, leaving them at a disadvantage.

The Society of Ethnomusicology Committee on Ethics publishes an official position statement on ethics.

=== Intellectual property ===
In many countries, copyright law controls how intellectual property such as musical works and recordings are protected. Copyright dictates how credit and money are allocated. While researchers conduct fieldwork, they interact with indigenous people. Once complete, they retain material including interviews and recordings. Copyright protects both researchers and creators. However, legal matters are country-specific, notably in China and India. In other cultures intellectual property may be a matter of tradition. The Suyá people in Brazil root ownership in animals, spirits, and entire communities. US copyright law invests named individuals (e.g., Lennon and McCartney) with ownership instead. In some cases copyright has been granted instead to the informant-performer, the researcher, the producer, or the funding organization.

In Senegal, copyright benefits such as music royalties are allocated to the Senegalese government, which hosts a talent competition, where the winner receives royalties. Scherzinger stated that spiritual inspiration did not prevent composers from copyrighting their creations. He draws a parallel between group ownership of a song and the influence in Western music of multiple composers on any individual work.

=== Identity ===
Music's connections to identity have been discussed throughout the history of ethnomusicology. Turino defines "self," "identity," and "culture" as habits. Musical habits and responses to them lead to culturally based identity and identity groups. Stokes claimed that music creates barriers among groups and that identity defines them.

Music reinforces identity, while identity can shape musical innovation. A 1986 case study of Mexican-American music in Los Angeles from the 1950s to the 1980s claimed that Chicano musicians mixed styles and genres to represent their multifaceted cultural identity. By incorporating Mexican folk music and modern-day barrio influences, Mexican rock-and-roll musicians in LA made commercially successful records that reflected their community, history, and identity. Minority groups sought solidarity by sharing experience with others. The study highlighted Los Lobos as an example. They mixed traditional Mexican folk elements with white rockabilly and rhythm and blues, while conforming to none of those genres. Their goal was to broaden their audience. Chicano artists connected their music to community subcultures and institutions reflecting speech, dress, car customizing, art, theater, and politics.

Music creates group and personal identities and manipulates moods and organizes daily life. Many scholars have explored how musical taste contributes to a sense of unique identity developed through the practices of listening to and performing music.

==== Gender ====
Later researchers criticized historical ethnomusicology for gender bias and androcentric models that distorted reality. Early research often focused on male musicians, in line with the greater attention paid to men in most domains at the time. This implicitly presumed that male musical practices were the only ones of significance. In some societies, women were not allowed/encouraged to perform in public, making it tougher for researchers to find female musicians. Further, men initially dominated fieldwork and related institutions and tended to prioritize the experiences of other men.

Women began contributing fieldwork in the 1950s, although women's and gender studies in ethnomusicology took off in the 1970s as in other domains. Koskoff discerned three stages in women's studies within ethnomusicology:

- filling gaps in the knowledge of women's contributions;
- discussing the relationships between women and men as expressed through music;
- integrating the study of sexuality, performance, semiotics, and other forms of meaning-making.

In the 1990s, researchers began to consider fieldworker identity, including gender and sexuality. Feminist ethnomusicology emerged in the late 1980s (driven by third wave feminism), as women began conducting fieldwork instead of interpreting works recorded by men.

Koskoff claimed that gender is a useful lens for assessing musical practices. She claimed parallels between the sexual binary and others such as private/public, feeling/action, and sacred/profane. She claimed that music can support or subvert gender roles. Koskoff further claimed that musical instruments' shapes and playing motions reflect gender roles. Koskoff also claimed that female musical involvement is affiliated with heightened sexuality, and that different cultures hold similar criteria of eroticized dance movements (e.g. Swahili hold an "...all-female gathering where women learn...the 'right' sexual movements). Koskoff claimed that in certain cultures, public female musical performance is linked to female sexuality and to implied or actual prostitution that is not typically part of private performance.

She claimed that public music performance by single women of child-bearing age was typically associated with sexuality, while that of older/married women downplayed or even denied their sexuality. This reflects the traditional view that a woman's sexuality decreases with age/marriage.

In cultures that hinder women's public performance, women-centric performance spaces may offer a way to express female identity outside the age/marriage sexuality binary. In some cultures, women have encoded symbolic behavior and language into their performances to protest an unwanted marriage, mock a suitor, or express homosexuality that is not apparent to men. As such, music performance may maintain, protest, or challenge gender norms. Koskoff claimed that women who become popular in mainstream culture may take on masculine-coded qualities, even when their expression of femininity initially helped them.

Doubleday claimed that men may attempt to dominate their instruments, while women do not. If a female artist's allure is more important for her success than her music, the latter may not sustain her. Doubleday defined "suitable" instruments for women as those that require no physical exertions which do not disrupt the graceful stereotype of a woman.

Schreffler described the role of Punjabi women in music in the context of migration. Women are often the bearers of tradition in Punjabi culture, performing in many traditional Punjabi rituals, including musical rituals, which help enable migrants to connect with Punjabi culture regardless of location. Schreffler claimed that as a result of migration, bhangra music allowed women to mingle with men in non-traditional ways.

Similarly, a 2026 study of gender dynamics within Orthodox Jewish culture documented how partnership minyanim dance reinterpreted religious law to establish a new context for women's performance, escaping the tradition of excluding women from religious music for reasons of female modesty. Orthodox men insisted that it was impossible for a man to hear a woman singing without experiencing it as a sexual provocation, while male partnership minyan participants concluded instead that considerations of modesty were not applicable in the context of their prayer. Therefore, a woman's singing could be considered an act of rebellion against Orthodox power structures. Dale stated that women's music initiatives such as Indonesian women chanting from the Qur'an required Orthodoxy to create a new religious space in which men and women could express themselves. While restrictions on female roles in worship mean that minyanim must focus more on partnership than equality, partnership minyanim can forge a prayer space that encourages women's voices. He described one interaction with an older woman who was uncomfortable leading religious worship, but appreciated observing other women in that role. Singing alongside women in an unrestrained manner was a comfortable and fulfilling way for her to practice feminism.

Efforts to document and preserve women's contributions to ethnomusicology have increased, including collecting works and related literature that address gender inequities within musical performance and musical analysis.

In reflexive ethnography, researchers critically consider how their identity may impact their work and the societies and people they study. For example, Hagedorn described how her race, gender, and home culture afforded her luxuries out of reach of her Cuban counterparts in her research on santeria. Her identity put her in an "outsider" position with respect to Cuban culture. Unlike her Cuban female counterparts who faced stigma, she was allowed to play the bata drum and thus advance her research.

The Gender and Sexualities Taskforce within the Society for Ethnomusicology works to increase the presence and stature of gender/sexuality/LGBTQ/feminist scholarship. The Society awards the Marcia Herndon Prize, honoring exceptional ethnomusicological work in gender and sexuality including works that focus upon lesbian, gay, bisexual, two-spirited, homosexual, transgender and multiple gender issues and communities, as well as to commemorate Herndon's contributions in promoting works by women that compare the philosophies and behaviors of male and female researchers and musicians, along dimensions of spirituality, female empowerment, and culturally defined gender-related duties.

==== Nationalism ====
Nationalism interacts with music in various ways.

In the latter half of the 19th century, song collectors motivated by the legacy of folkloric studies and musical nationalism in Southern and Eastern Europe collected folk songs for use in the construction of a pan-Slavic identity. Collector-composers became "national composers" when they composed songs that became emblematic of national identity. Namely, Frédéric Chopin gained international recognition as a composer of emblematic Polish music despite having no ancestral ties to the Polish peasantry. Composers such as Béla Bartók, Jean Sibelius, Edvard Grieg, and Nikolai Rimsky-Korsakov composed songs for the benefit of the governments of their respective countries. D'Erlanger revived older musical forms in Tunisia in order to reconstruct "Oriental music," played with instruments such as the ud and using ghazal lyrics. Ensembles using such instruments were featured at the 1932 Cairo Congress of Arab Music.

==== Globalism ====
Towards the end of the 20th century, ethnomusicology flourished in the US. It gave students another vehicle for exploring other cultures, including students from various cultures. Recordings from around the world began to emerge in the Euro-American music industry. Many scholars ventured abroad to study other cultures. Scholars learned firsthand about faraway cultures.

In the 1990s industry pushed the term World Music as a way to market "non-Western" music. Examples began appearing on the Billboard charts, in Grammy Award nominations, and through participation of immigrants involved as musicians and audience members. The term was a market success in the US, but made no sense elsewhere.

Glocalization is the simultaneous presence of universalizing and particularizing forces in social, political, and economic systems. A musical example is the emergence of a new genre such as Cumbia in Columbia and its rapid spread in other countries.

As the Punjab evolved from an isolated area under the British into a cohesive identity, eventually launching its own diaspora, bhangra music transformed from a regional entertainment into a signal of Punjabi national identity in the 1940s and 1950s. It became associated with Punjabi nationalism and from there into the 1970s absorbed external influences that made it accessible to Punjabi expatriates, outrunning the appeal of more traditional works. Recorded Punjabi pop then became prevalent, reacting to the globalization of preferences and fully escaping the social norms and restrictions that had provided its original character. By then it encompassed a more diverse set of experiences: "East/West, guardians of tradition/embracers of new technology, local/diaspora".

While visiting Los Angeles, Mexican poet and diplomat Octavio Paz observed that the culture of Mexico seemed to float around the city. He felt that the culture neither quite existed nor entirely vanished. Mexican-American culture in Los Angeles can be found in various affinity groups. The groups bonded over their existence in between spaces, their juxtaposition of multiple realities, and their families of resemblance.

Particularly in Chicano music, musicians were strongly encouraged to take on a separate identity. One form of success might be record sales, while another might be receiving respect as contributors to musical masterpieces. Don Tostino's Band reflected on how difficult it was for them to present Chicano music while maintaining their identity, citing audience expectations that the band arrive on stage in sombreros, tropical outfits, and other stereotypes.

Another example of globalization in music concerns UNESCO-recognized traditions, those promoted by national governments, as cases of notable global heritage. In this way, local traditions are introduced to a global audience as something that is so important as to both represent a nation and be of relevance to all people everywhere.

==== Appropriation ====
Immature poets imitate; mature poets steal

— T. S. Eliot, The Sacred Wood

Cultural appropriation is a manifestation of the long-time phenomenon of musicians and other artists taking ideas from works by others. Before the recording era, this mostly occurred within individual cultures where artists learned from others nearby. Thereafter, the stage broadened and musicians could easily learn of and take from music from anywhere. This became controversial when Western artists took from non-Western cultures without properly acknowledging or compensating their sources.

Paul Simon's collaboration with South African musicians for his Graceland album attracted criticism. Simon paid the South African musicians for their work, but retained legal and contract rights to the result. Critics claimed that all the musicians should retain some ownership.

Perceptions of impropriety can be subjective. For example, American singer/composer James Brown's borrowings of African rhythms, and African musician Fela Kuti's borrowings from Brown did not raise alarms, unlike Talking Heads' borrowings from Brown.

These issues of cultural appropriation and this overall representation have become very important and central to more recent ethnomusicological reflections. Ethnomusicologist Kevin M. Delgado brings awareness to this longstanding logo utilized by the Society of Ethnomusicology of a "flute playing figure from the Cuna culture of Panama" Delgado brought awareness to this appropriation by comparing it to Native American Mascots that have been utilized by sports teams and schools. By doing so, he argues that these imageries speak about colonial and bizarre perspectives that he mentions does not correlate or align with the fields ideals and commitments. Throughout this critique it showcases this broad and expanded showcase of these disciplinary debates that touch on things such as decolonization and these visual symbols that are utilized by the field to present their work.

This logo was later changed in the newer editions of the Society of Ethnomusicology.

Another scholar he talks about this appropriation is a folklorist and ethnologist called Jason Baird Jackson. He touches more on this wider theoretical structure when it comes to situating things like cultural appropriation through this spectrum of change. He views this appropriation through the concepts of "the key neighboring modes" these being "diffusion, acculturation, and assimilation." Truly emphasizing this injustice and unequal power that can later create harm for these communities.

==== Decolonialism ====
In humanities and education studies, the term decolonization describes "processes involving social justice, resistance, sustainability, and preservation". For ethnomusicology, understanding decolonization means analyzing fundamental changes in power structures, worldviews, academia, and the university system. As early as 2006, decolonization became a central topic of discussion, although some researchers considered it only a metaphor.

Ethnomusicologists have used decolonial approaches for diverse purposes, including showing how non-Western nations use music projects to negotiate international relations, and to promote equality and transparency in intercultural music performance.

Initially, Western methods and beliefs dominated ethnomusicology, as shown in Alder's work from 1885 and Gilman's work from 1909, which exemplify that Eurocentric approach of analyzing music via musical scores. The arrival of recording technology and convenient travel enabled other approaches. Reliance on European knowledge and musical notation obscured the complexities of other musical traditions, some of which used scales for which no written notation existed at the time.

However, representing/interpreting music of all cultures with a standard system and notation can also be useful. Western music notation and musical systems serve allow the comprehensive analysis and assessment of musical compositions. This standardized system provides a common language that enables musicians, scholars, and enthusiasts from diverse backgrounds to communicate effectively about musical elements such as melody, harmony, rhythm, and structure.

Music archives are in part a legacy of colonial ethnomusicology. Comparative musicologists used archives such as the Berlin Phonogramm-Archiv to study the world's music. Recovery and repatriation of archival records are one way to decolonize the field. The International Library of African Music is one recipient of such material. Proposed approaches to decolonization include:

- ethnomusicologists addressing their roles as scholars,
- analyzing and revising the university system,
- changing philosophies and practices.

Kibbee proposed that scholars admit research presented via non-written media. He claimed to observe a Western bias against listening as an intellectual practice that he further claimed reduced the diversity of opinion and backgrounds. He linked this to colonialism via the ostensible Kantian belief that the act of listening was seen as a "danger to the autonomy of the enlightened liberal subject". He claimed that colonists tied social mobility to the ability to assimilate European schooling. Many such barriers kept other voices out of academia, such as the denial of intellectual depth in indigenous peoples.

== Technology ==
Technology has dramatically affected the practice of ethnomusicology. Prior to recording technology, music could only be transmitted via performance in most cultures. Western culture, beginning in Mesopotamia, developed written notations. The phonograph, radio, cassettes, film and video, and ultimately digital technology transformed how music could be studied. It also affected music's cultural roles in many societies, in some cases losing its ability to exemplify and unite communities. Recordings democratized recording and listening, reducing the power of governments to limit what residents can listen to. Digital recordings initially created a subculture of music sharing and distribution outside industry control, before industry responded by creating even simpler streaming services.

== Cognition ==
Cognitive psychology, neuroscience, anatomy, and similar fields study how music relates to perception, cognition, and behavior. Topics include pitch perception, representation and expectation, timbre perception, rhythm processing, event hierarchies, performance/ability, universals, origins/development, and cross-cultural cognition.

=== Scale ===
Scale construction is culturally specific. Training in a cultural scale results in melodic and harmonic expectations for how music is arranged. Issues such as the definition of dissonance and whether that ascription is learned remain unsettled.

Many musical traditions' tunings align with their dominant instrument's timbre's partials and fall on the tuning continuum of syntonic temperament, suggesting that syntonic temperament (and closely related temperaments) may be a potential near-universal.

=== Rhythm ===
African and Western rhythms appear to be organized differently. Western rhythms are based on ratio relationships (e.g., halves and quarters), while African rhythms appear to be organized additively (each note has its own duration). A 1997 study analyzed a drummer who produced prototypical rhythm patterns. A mathematical model was used to test hypotheses on the timing of the beats, leading to the conclusion that all drumming patterns could be interpreted within an additive structure, which was thus proposed to be a universal rhythm framework.

=== Timbre ===
Timbre is how humans distinguish the sounds of different instruments and voices playing the same note. Unlike pitch, timbre has not been decomposed into physical phenomena that corresponds to an acoustic signal. One view is that timbre is purely psychological. Another approach considers timbre at a musical level. Timbral extraction involves decomposing a sound into its component frequencies (audible in overtone singing and didjeridoo music). Timbral redistribution creates new combinations of gestalt components into new groups, creating a chimeric sound (audible in Ghanaian balafon music or the bell tone in barbershop singing). Timbral juxtaposition combines sounds that fall on opposing ends of a timbral continuum that extends from harmonically based to formant-structured (audible in overtone singing or the minde ornament in sitar music).

== Domains ==
=== Applied ethnomusicology ===
Titon described applied ethnomusicology as "a music-centered intervention into a particular community whose purpose is to benefit that community, for example a social improvement, a musical benefit, a cultural good, or an economic advantage".

The term first appeared in an official SEM publication in 1964 when Merriam wrote, "The ultimate aim of the study of man involves the question of whether one is searching knowledge for its own sake or is attempting to provide solutions for practically applied problems." Applied ethnomusicology's purpose is knowledge for the sake of positive impact on society. One part of applied ethnomusicology is advocacy. This includes working with a community to move social initiatives forward, and "acting as an intermediary between cultural insiders and outsiders". The idea spread in the 1990s, but many fieldworkers were already practicing it. For example, McAllester's fieldwork on Enemy Way music showed how applied ethnomusicology can increase understanding for the betterment of the Navajo Nation. Fieldwork is crucial to applied ethnomusicology. McAllester described his role after conducting fieldwork: "And my experience, once I got among the Navajos, caused me to drop out of anthropology. I dropped the scientific point of view to a large extent, and I became…um, an advocate of the Navajos, rather than an objective viewer. And I was certainly among those in ethnomusicology who began to value… the views of the people who make the music, more than the value of the trained scholars who were studying it."

=== Western music ===
Early in the history of ethnomusicology, debate focused on whether ethnomusicology applied to Western music. Early scholars such as Hood argued that ethnomusicology had two potential foci: all non-European art music, and music found in a given geographical area.

By the 1960s some researchers were proposing to apply ethnomusicological methods to Western music. For example, Merriam defined ethnomusicology simply as the study of music in culture, without regard to geography. This argument won the battle. Pace claimed that questions regarding ethnomusicology's cultural scope were political rather than scholarly.

Despite the increased acceptance of work on Western music, researchers continued to focus on non-Western music. Kingsbury was one of the few major ethnomusicological examiners of Western art music.

Nettl studied symbolism in Western music culture. He cited an example of an analyst interpreting Beethoven in a literal fashion according to specific pieces of literature. The analyst assigned meanings to motifs and melodies. Nettl stated that this reveals how members of Western music culture are inclined to view art music as symbolic.

Some ethnomusicological work focuses less on specific cultures. For example, Stokes' work on identity encompassed both Western and non-Western cultures. He claimed that some cultures may seek to "desex" musicians as a form of control. Stokes studied identity, nationality, and location and how this manifests in Western music. He stated that Irish music in migrant communities in England and American was a way for individuals to locate themselves in a different part of the world.

=== Medical ethnomusicology ===
Medical ethnomusicology is a subfield of ethnomusicology. Medical ethnomusicology, similar to medical anthropology, uses music-making, musical sound, and noise to study human health, wellness, healing, and disease prevention integrating biological, psychological, social, emotional, and spiritual realms. Other fields involving the interaction between sound, culture, and health include medical anthropology, medical sociology, music therapy, art therapy, and sound studies.

In 2008, the Society for Ethnomusicology defined medical ethnomusicology as "integrative research and applied practice that explores holistically the roles of music and sound phenomena and related praxes in any cultural and clinical context of health and healing." Medical ethnomusicologists have applied music to autism, Asperger syndrome, dementia, HIV/AIDS, and cognitive therapy.

Medical ethnomusicology blends "anthropological and ethnological, historical and literary techniques" and challenges Western notions of medicine with alternatives such as ethnomedicine. In many cultures, music is regarded as a form of healing, often in conjunction with other practices such as prayer and ritual. Musical ethnomusicology aims to explore their conjunction on a broader cultural scale.

Medical ethnomusicology is a modern field, first emerging into relevance in the 1990s. However, the interrelation of music and healing has been touched upon in past cultural research—for example, in Densmore’s 1918 study of the Teton Sioux. Much research in this field is specific to certain cultures studied, such as Roseman’s focus on the Malaysian Rainforest, Melchor-Barz in Uganda, and Koen in the Pamir Mountains.

One influential piece of writing is “The Oxford Handbook of Medical Ethnomusicology,” written by Benjamin D. Koen, Gregory Barz, and Kenneth Brummel-Smith. This novel was among the first to define the new field and explore its depths. In this book, they define medical ethnomusicology as the “integration of music and sound phenomena” within the “cultural clinical context of health and healing,” and discuss the true meaning of music, medicine, as well as how the two can interact in different settings. It accomplishes three main goals: to elucidate the relationship between health, illness, and disease; to encourage innovative, collaborative research to improve health and healing; and to document the current discourse involving music, culture, and healing.

=== Ethnochoreology ===
Ethnochoreology (also dance ethnology, dance anthropology, ethnic dance) is the study of dance through the application of anthropology, musicology, ethnomusicology, and ethnography. Ethnochoreology attempts to apply academic thought to the meaning and motivations of dance.

== Academic programs ==
Many universities offer ethnomusicology classes, including graduate and undergraduate degree-granting options. The Society of Ethnomusicology maintains a list of such programs. Undergraduates often enroll in music courses to study music theory, history, and performance, with an emphasis on world music traditions. Master's and Ph.D. programs in ethnomusicology are commonly available. Proficiency in multiple languages is encouraged.

== Popular culture ==
Some music festivals pertain to ethnomusicology, notably World of Music, Arts and Dance, held in multiple countries. This festival was first held in 1982.

Paul Simon's album, Graceland (1986) received substantial interest from ethnomusicologists for its elements of South African music. The Kronos Quartet has featured collaborations with traditional musicians from many cultures, as shown in Pieces of Africa.

Ethnomusicology has appeared in literature. For example, in Karen Hesse's novel, The Music of Dolphins (1996), Doctor Elizabeth Beck is an ethnomusicologist researching the musical communication of dolphins. The science fiction novel The Summer Prince by Alaya Dawn Johnson (2013), presents an ethnomusicologist as its protagonist.

In film, The Buena Vista Social Club (1999), brings traditional Cuban music to world audiences and illustrates ethnomusicological elements. Songcatcher (2000) is loosely based on the work of Olive Dame Campbell. In Inside Out 2 (2024), ethnomusicologist is briefly mentioned as a possible future career for Riley.

== See also ==
For articles on significant individuals in this discipline, see the List of ethnomusicologists.

- List of musicologists
- Choreomusicology
- Fumio Koizumi Prize for Ethnomusicology
- List of musicology topics
- Prehistoric music
- Smithsonian Folkways
- Sociomusicology
- World music
- International Council for Traditional Music

== Bibliography ==
- Myers, Helen, ed. (1992). Ethnomusicology: An introduction. W.W. Norton. ISBN 978-0-8153-0764-8.
- Hebert, David G.; McCollum, Jonathan, eds. (2022). Ethnomusicology and Cultural Diplomacy. Lexington Books. ISBN 978-1-7936-4291-2.
- Hood, Mantle (1971). The Ethnomusicologist. Mc-Graw Hill.
- Blacking, John (1973). How Musical Is Man?. Seattle: University of Washington Press. ISBN 0-295-95218-0.
- Harrison, Frank (1973). Time, Place and Music. An Anthology of Ethnomusicological Observation, c. 1550 – c. 1800. Amsterdam: Frits Knuf. ISBN 90-6027-241-2. OCLC 164765118..
- Stone, Ruth (2008). Theory for Ethnomusicology. Upper Saddle River, N.J.: Pearson Prentice Hall. ISBN 978-0-13-240840-0.
- Pettan, Svanibor, and Jeff Todd Titon, eds. (2015). The Oxford Handbook of Applied Ethnomusicology. New York: Oxford University Press. ISBN 9780199351701.
