= History of ethnomusicology =

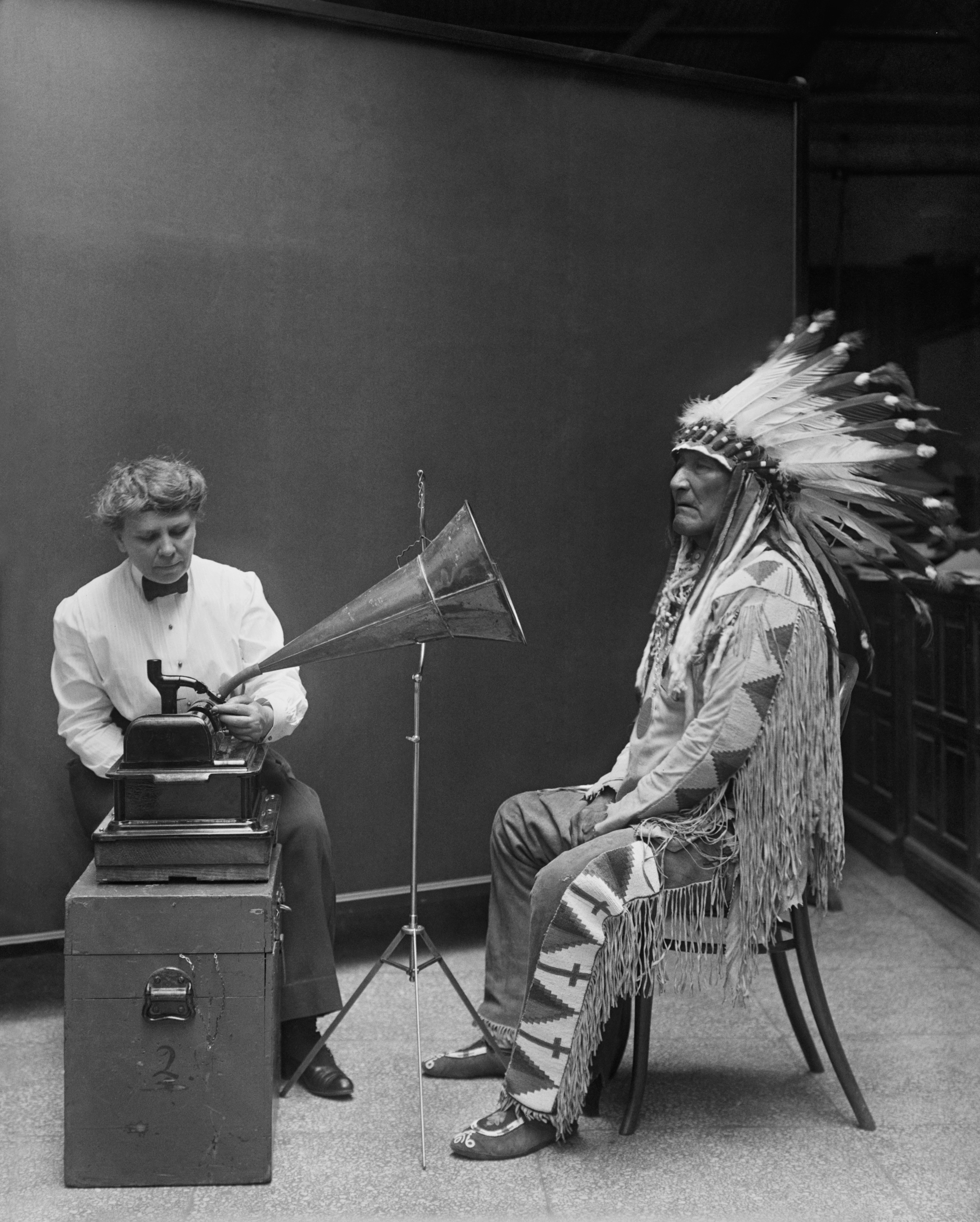
Frances Densmore at the Smithsonian Institution in 1916 where she was recording Blackfoot chief Mountain Chief for the Bureau of American Ethnology. In this picture, Mountain Chief is listening to a recording.

Historical recording of Eagle Song by Hopi people of Arizona, 1906

The history of ethnomusicology describes the evolution of the discipline of ethnomusicology, which integrates the cultural and social roles and influences of the people who make it. Oskar Kolberg is one of the earliest ethnomusicologists who began by collecting Polish folk songs in 1839. Comparative musicology, the primary precursor to ethnomusicology, emerged in the late 19th century and early 20th century. The International Musical Society in Berlin in 1899 acted as one of the first centers for ethnomusicology. Comparative musicology and early ethnomusicology tended to focus on non-Western music, but later, the field expanded to embrace Western music.

When ethnomusicology first emerged in Western academic circles, its focus was primarily on non-Western music. This often neglected European and Western musical traditions, creating a contrast with conventional musicology, which centered on Western art music. This approach led to criticism for imposing Western biases on non-Western music, which prompted scholars to shift from "comparative musicology" to "ethnomusicology" in the 1950s. The new term aimed to emphasize a descriptive, culture-sensitive approach that respected each musical tradition on its own terms.

Over time, the scope of ethnomusicology broadened to encompass the study of music from all cultural contexts, including Western traditions. Pioneering figures like Alan Merriam and David McAllester emphasized that music should be understood as a form of human behavior and expression rather than solely as an object of analysis. This reflects a more human-centric approach, where music is seen as both an art form and a social and a cultural phenomenon deeply connected to identity, tradition, and daily life. This perspective rejected confined distinctions between “Western” and “non-Western” music and encouraged analysis grounded in the lived experiences of the communities studied. Later writers, including Charles Seeger and Steven Feld, extended this approach by emphasizing performance, embodiment, and the situated meanings of sound within cultural life.

Folklorists, who began preserving and studying folklore music in Europe and the US in the 19th century, are considered the precursors of the field prior to the Second World War. Oskar Kolberg is regarded as one of the earliest European ethnomusicologists as he first began collecting Polish folk songs in 1839. The International Musical Society in Berlin in 1899 acted as one of the first centers for ethnomusicology.

== Folklore ==
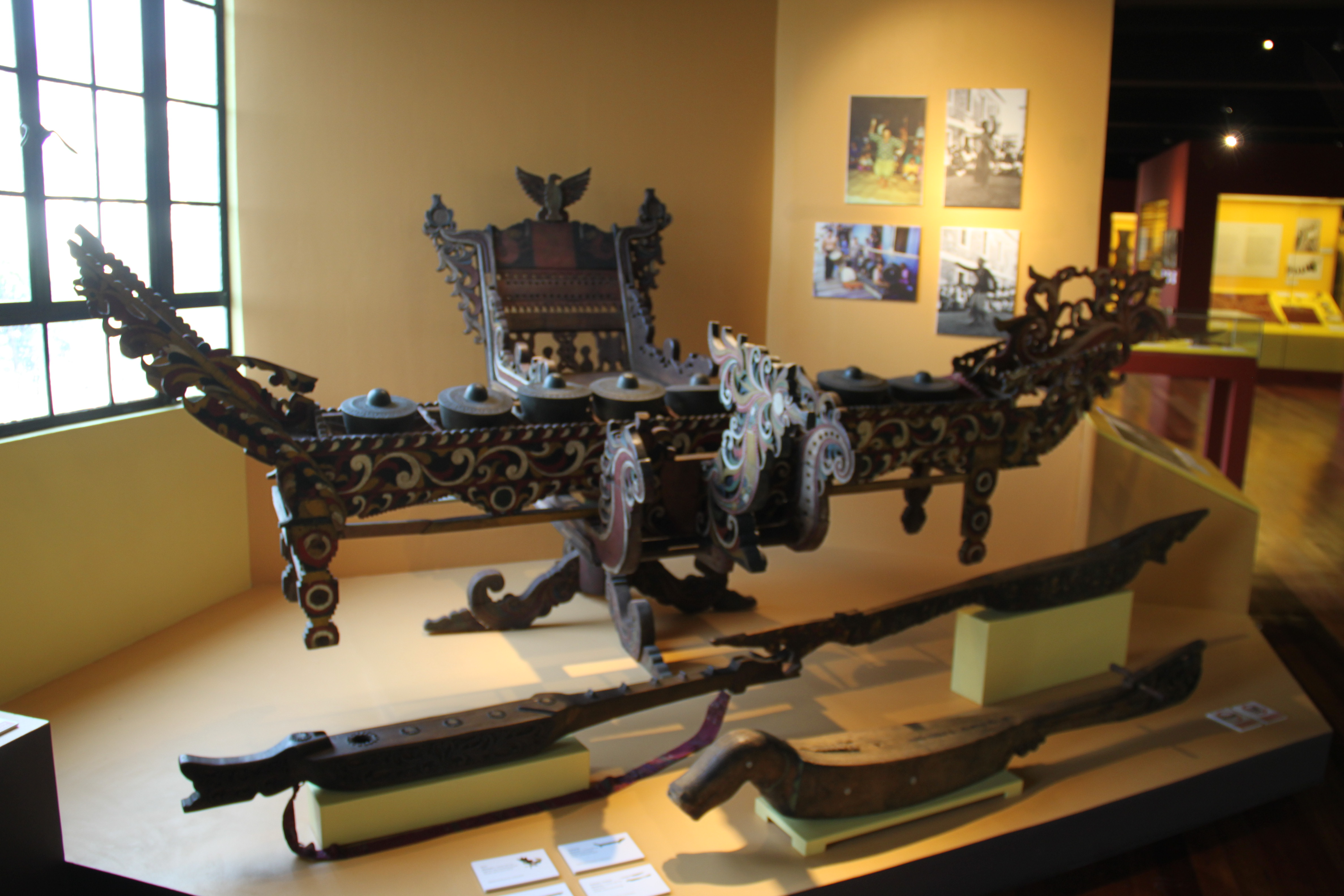
The kulintang is used in multiple societies in maritime Southeast Asia. The instrument and the songs always have folkloric motifs.

Folklore and folklorists were the precursors to the field of ethnomusicology prior to WWII. They laid a foundation of interest in the preservation and continuation of the traditional folk musics of nations and an interest in the differences between the musics of various nations. Folklorists approached folklore through comparative methods, seeking to prove that folk music was simple but reflected the lives of the lower classes.

Folklore is defined as "traditional customs, tales, sayings, dances, or art forms preserved among a people." Bruno Nettl, an ethnomusicologist, defines folk music as "...the music in oral tradition found in those areas dominated by high cultures." This definition can be simplified to the traditional music of a certain people within a country or region.

Folkloric studies were partly motivated by nationalism and the search for national identities. Southern and Eastern European composers incorporated folk music into their compositions to instil sentiments of nationalism in their audiences. Examples of such composers are Leoš Janáček, Edvard Grieg, Jean Sibelius, Béla Bartók, and Nikolai Rimsky-Korsakov. As Helen Meyers puts it, "Nationalist composers throughout Europe turned to peasant song to enrich the classical musical idiom of their country." In the United States, the preservation of folk music was part of a search for a sense of national tradition in the face of striking regional diversity.

"The collecting projects of southern and eastern Europeans of the second half of the 19th century were largely contributions to folkloric studies. These collectors feared that entire repertories were on the point of extinction, repertories that were thought a proper base for nationalist styles of art music. Early collectors were motivated by musical nationalism, theories of self-determination, and by hope for a musical rationale for a pan-Slavic identity...eastern Europeans explored their own linguistic setting, amassing large collections, thousands of song texts and, later, tunes, which they sought to classify and compare." The most well-known eastern European collectors were Béla Bartók (Hungary), Constantin Brăiloiu (Romania), Klement Kvitka (Ukraine), Adolf Chybinski (Poland), and Vasil Stoin (Bulgaria).

In 1931, Béla Bartók published an essay detailing his study of what he refers to as "Peasant music" which "...connotes...all the tunes which endure among the peasant class of any nation, in a more or less wide area and for a more or less long period, and constitute a spontaneous expression of the musical feeling of that class." Bartok takes a comparative approach in his investigation of Hungarian folk music and believes that peasant music is primitive when compared to the music of the educated class.

In North America, state folklore societies were founded in the early 20th century and were dedicated to the collection and preservation of Old World folksong, i.e. music that came from Europe, Africa, or places outside of the U.S. during the settlement of the U.S. by colonizers; Native American music was also included in these societies. "In 1914 the US Department of Education instigated a rescue mission for ballads and folksongs, stimulating an era of collecting by local enthusiasts and academics that lasted through the Great Depression until World War II."

Cecil Sharp, a lawyer turned musician, greatly contributed to the collection and preservation of British folk songs found in Appalachia. His interest in folk music began in 1903, when he discovered that a large amount of native folk song survived in England and published Folk Songs from Somerset (1904–1909). After he studied traditional English folk song in England, he traveled to the Appalachia region with his collaborator Maud Karpeles of the United States of America three times between the years 1916 and 1918 and discovered around 1,600 English tunes and variants.

In 1909 Olive Dame Campbell traveled to the Appalachia region of the U.S. from Massachusetts and discovered that the ballads sung by the residents had strong ties to English and Scots-Irish folk songs. This region of the United States preserved these old folk songs because it was isolated from the city centers of the original thirteen colonies. She collected ballads by having people sing them to her while she recorded them on a phonograph and transcribed them. She worked with Cecil Sharp and published the ballads that she had collected in English Folk Songs from the Southern Appalachians.

A controversy in the field of musicology arose surrounding Negro Spirituals. A musical spiritual is defined as "a religious song usually of a deeply emotional character that was developed especially among blacks in the southern U.S." The controversy revolved around whether the spirituals originated solely from Africa or if they were influenced by European music. Richard Wallaschek claimed that Negro Spirituals were merely imitations of European song, starting the debate on the subject. Erich von Hornbostel concluded that African and European musics were constructed on different principles and therefore could not be combined. The white origin theory argued that black music had been influenced by Anglo-American song and constituted an integral part of the British tradition. Melville J. Herskovits and his student Richard A. Waterman discovered that "European and African forms had blended to produce new genres bearing features of both parent musics. European and African music...have many features in common, among them diatonic scales and polyphony. When these two musics met, during the slave era, it was natural for them to blend..." Negro Spirituals were the first black musical genre comprehensively studied by scholars.

The interest in folklore did not end with the folklorists before World War II. After World War II, the International Folk Music Council was founded and was later renamed the International Council for Traditional Music. In 1978, Alan Lomax sought to classify and compare the music of world cultures through a system he named Cantometrics. This goal began with his idea that singing is a universal characteristic and therefore all musics of the world should have some comparable characteristics. Lomax believed that human migration could be tracked through songs; when a certain culture's song or style is heard in another geographical region, it signifies that the two cultures interacted at some point. Lomax thought that all folk song styles vary with, and can be compared using, several categories, which include: productive range, political level, level of stratification of class, severity of sexual mores, balance of dominance between male and female, and the level of social cohesiveness. He compared vocal performances through a set of characteristics, some of which are 'raspiness', the use of meaningful words, and the use of meaningful syllables.

== Comparative Musicology ==
Comparative musicology is known as the cross-cultural study of music. Once referred to as "Musikologie", comparative musicology emerged in the late 19th century in response to the works of Komitas Keworkian (also known as Komitas Vardapet or Soghomon Soghomonian.) A precedent to modern ethnomusicological studies, comparative musicology seeks to look at music throughout world cultures and their respective histories. Similarly to comparative linguistics, comparative musicology seeks to classify music of global cultures, illustrate their geographic distribution, explain universal musical trends, and understand the causation concerning the creation and evolution of music. Developed throughout the early 20th century, the term "comparative musicology" emerged in an 1885 publication by Guido Adler, who added the term "comparative" to musicology to describe works by scholars such as Alexander J. Ellis, whose academic process was founded in cross-cultural comparative studies. As one of four subdivisions of systematic musicology, "comparative musicology" was once described by Adler himself as the task of "comparing tonal products, in particular the folk songs of various peoples, countries, and territories, with an ethnographic purpose in mind, grouping and ordering these according to...their characteristics".

Comparative musicology has been seen as inspired by the work of Komitas Vardapet, an Armenian priest, musicologist and choirmaster, who began his work studying in Berlin. His work primarily focused on the transcription of nearly 4000 pieces of Armenian, Turkish, and Kurdish folk music. His efforts to categorize and classify various music styles inspired others to do the same. This included Guido Adler, a Bohemian-Austrian musicologist and professor at the German Charles University in Prague, who officially coined the term "vergleichende Musikwissenschaft" (translated: comparative music science) in 1885 in response to the emergence of new academic methods of studying music. Around the same time of Adler's development of the terminology associated with the study, the work of Alexander J. Ellis, who focused primarily on developing the cents system, was emerging as the foundation of the comparative elements of musicology. This cents system allowed from precise delineation of particular measurements denoted from pitch denoted as "hundredths of an equal-tempered semitone". Ellis also established a general definition for the pitch of a musical note, which he noted as "the number of...complete vibrations...made in each second by a particle of air while the note is heard".

Other contemporaries of Komitas, Ellis, and Adler included Erich von Hornbostel, and Carl Stumpf, who are credited with establishing comparative musicology as an official field separate from musicology itself. Von Hornbostel, who once stated that Ellis was the "true founder of comparative scientific musicology.", was an Austrian scholar of music, while Stumpf was a German philosopher and psychologist. Together with Otto Abraham, they founded the Berlin School of Comparative Musicology. Despite working together, Stumpf and Hornbostel had very different ideas regarding the foundation of the school. As Stumpf focused primarily from a psychological perspective, his position was founded in the belief of "unity of the human mind"; his interests were on sensual experiences of tones and intervals and their respective ordering. In addition, his studies focused on testing his hypothesis of perceived fusion of tones. On the other hand, Hornbostel adopted Stumpf's assignment, but rather approached the topic from his systematic and theoretical perspective, and did not concern himself with others. Through the institution, additional scholars such as Curt Sachs, Mieczyslaw Kolinski, George Herzog and Jaap Kunst (who first coined the term "ethno-musicology" in a 1950 article) further expanded the field of comparative musicology. Additionally Hungarian composer Béla Bartók was conducting his own comparative studies at the time, focusing primarily on Hungarian (and other) folk music, in addition to the influence of European popular music on musical folk-lore of that particular geographic region.

Eventually, comparative musicology began experiencing changes. Following the Second World War, issues regarding the ethical contexts of comparative musicology began to emerge. As comparative musicology was founded primarily in Europe, most scholars based their comparisons on Western music. In an effort to adjust the Western bias present in their studies, academics such as Jaap Kunst began to adjust their approaches in analysis and fieldwork to become more globally focused. In the 1950s, comparative musicology continued to evolve to become ethnomusicology; but it still remains today a field focused primarily on comparative studies in music.

== Beginnings and early history ==
Ethnomusicology has evolved both in terminology and ideology since its formal inception in the late 19th century. Although practices paralleling ethnomusicological work have been noted throughout colonial history, an Armenian priest known as Komitas Vardapet is considered one of the pioneers to ethnomusicology's rise to prominence in 1896. While studying in Berlin at Frederick William University and attending the International Music Society, Vardapet transcribed over 3000 pieces of music. In his notes, he emphasized cultural and religious elements as well as social aspects of music and poetry.

Inspired by these thoughts, many Western European nations began to transcribe and categorize music based on ethnicity and culture. Inspired by these thoughts, many Western European nations began to put many ethnic and cultural pieces of music onto paper and separate them. It was known very briefly in the 1880s as "Musikologie" or "Musikgesellschaft," then "comparative musicology" until around 1950, at which point the term "ethno-musicology" was introduced to provide an alternative term to the traditional practices of comparative musicology. In 1956 the hyphen was removed with ideological intent to signify the discipline's validity and independence from the fields of musicology and anthropology. These changes to the field's name paralleled its internal shifts in ideological and intellectual emphasis.

Comparative musicology, an initial term intended to differentiate what would become ethnomusicology and musicology, was the area of study concerned with utilizing methods of acoustics to measure pitches and intervals, quantitatively comparing different kinds of music. Because of the high number of Europeans and Euro-Americans engaged with the area's research, comparative musicology primarily surveyed the music of non-Western oral folk traditions and then compared them against western conceptions of music. After 1950, scholars sought to define the field more broadly and to eradicate these notions of ethnocentrism inherent to the study of comparative musicology; for example, Polish scholar Mieczyslaw Kolinski proposed that scholars in the field focus on describing and understanding musics within their own contexts. Kolinski also urged the field to move beyond ethnocentrism even as the term ethnomusicology grew in popularity as a replacement for what was once described by comparative musicology. He noted in 1959 that the term ethnomusicology limited the field, both by imposing "foreignness" from a western standpoint and therefore excluding the study of western music with the same attention to cultural context that is given to otherized traditions, and by containing the field within anthropological problems rather than extending musical study to limitless disciplines within the humanities and the social sciences. Throughout critical developmental years in the 1950s and 1960s, ethnomusicologists shaped and legitimized the fledgling field through discussions of the responsibilities of ethnomusicologists and the ethical implications of ethnomusicological study, articulations of ideology, suggestions for practical methods of research and analysis, and definitions of music itself. It was also at this time that the emphasis of ethnomusicological work shifted from analysis to fieldwork, and the field began to develop research methods to center fieldwork over the traditional "armchair" work.

Willard Rhodes' “Toward a Definition of Ethnomusicology,” (1956) outlines a brief history of the beginnings of Ethnomusicology, in which he argues that three “types of studies” appear, parallel to changing ideas in what was called “comparative musicology”. Rhodes characterizes the first type of study as the earliest study, which was much more preoccupied with “musicological problems” than “ethnological”. Rhodes describes the second type as “ethnographic,” and as being primarily concerned with the “analysis and description of the music of an ethnic group in its cultural setting”. The third type finally emphasizes the study of music “in its proper relationship to culture,” and Rhodes notes the importance of studying music in the context of culture. Rhodes also argues that Ethnomusicology should include “the total music of man,” as opposed to solely the study of “non-European peoples”. Similar to the work of Merriam, Rhodes emphasizes the ways in which Ethnomusicology is a way of understanding culture.

Published in 1960, Alan Merriam's, “Ethnomusicology: A Discussion and Definition of the Field,” from the book Ethnomusicology, argues that ethnomusicology can be defined, “not as the study of extra-European music, but as ‘the study of music in culture’”. Merriam outlines an ethnomusicologist's “six areas of inquiry” as: 1) “the study of musical instruments and other implements by means of which the music system is carried out,” 2) “the study of song texts,” 3) “the categories of music,” 4) “the role and status of the musician,” 5) “the functions of music in relation to other aspects of culture,” and finally 6) “music as a creative cultural activity”. Rather than framing ethnomusicology as a field or discipline, Merriam makes clear that he considers ethnomusicology to be “clearly a method, an approach, to the study of music in culture”

In 1960, Mantle Hood established the Institute of Ethnomusicology at the University of California at Los Angeles, largely legitimizing the field and solidifying its position as an academic discipline. In 1960, Hood pioneered the idea of "bi-musicality," in which he argues that ethnomusicologists should know how to play the music from the culture they are studying.

== 1970s ==
In the 1970s, ethnomusicology was becoming more well known outside of the small circle of scholars who had founded and fostered the early development of the field. The influence of ethnomusicology spread to composers, music therapists, music educators, anthropologists, musicologists, and even popular culture. Ethnomusicology and its academic rigor lent newfound legitimacy, as well as useful theoretical and methodological frameworks, to projects that attempted to record, document, study, and/or compare musics from around the world. Alan Merriam classified these ethnomusicological participants in four groups:

- 1) Performers of ethnic music, including anyone at all who learns to play an instrument from another culture: This group grew considerably during the 1970s due to increased awareness of and interest in ethnic music, partly assisted by the dissemination of records. These performers range from self-taught amateurs to experienced graduates of university world music programs.
- 2) Teachers, usually primary or secondary, who teach the appreciation and performance of "ethnic" music: This group, along with the first, proliferated rapidly during the 1970s, aided in part by the October 1972 issue of the Music Educators Journal, a special issue entitled Music in World Cultures, which included a bibliography, discography, and filmography to aid teachers of the world's musics. These teachers are not necessarily ethnomusicologists, but are nonetheless advancing some of the aims of the field.
- 3) The musicological contingent: ethnomusicologists who study music in terms of the sound object (this can be in the form of performances, recordings, or transcriptions, and focuses on the pitch, rhythmic, formal, and harmonic content); cultural context, for these ethnomusicologists, assumes a secondary role.
- 4) The anthropological contingent: ethnomusicologists who focus on human beings with the stance that "music is culture" and "what musicians do is society."

One defining feature of this decade was the advent of anthropological influence within ethnomusicology. During this time, the discipline of ethnomusicology experienced a shift of focus away from musical data, such as pitch and formal structure, toward humans and human relationships. The incorporation of theoretical frameworks from the field of anthropology also led to an increasingly welcoming attitude towards accepting yet more fields of study, such as linguistics and psychology, into the broader pursuit of understanding music as it functions in (or "as") culture.

For example, in George List's, “A Discipline Defined,” published in 1979, List notes that since the creation of the term “ethnomusicology,” the discipline has come to encompass “almost any type of human activity that conceivably can be related in some manner to what may be termed music,” such as other disciplines in the humanities, arts, and sciences.

However, there was still debate over the definition of Ethnomusicology, and questions of what work is considered Ethnomusicology and what work is not. To List, ethnomusicology is defined by “what the ethnomusicologist is better equipped to accomplish than” scholars of other professions - which is why he takes issue with Merriam's understanding of Ethnomusicology as “the study of music in culture” List critiques Merriam's understanding of Ethnomusicology and argues that Merriam's The Anthropology of Music (1960) belongs more to Anthropology than to Ethnomusicology. List also argues that Ethnomusicology is not an “approach” or “method” as Merriam has argued; instead, he believes something can be considered Ethnomusicology so long as it helps one better understand music (as opposed to using music to answer questions from other disciplines).

Throughout this decade, the tensions regarding comparative approaches continued to come into question in ethnomusicological circles. The introduction of Alan Lomax's system of cantometrics in the late 60s accounted for physical traits of vocal production like language/utterance, the distinctness of "singing voice" from speaking voice, use of intonation, ornamentation, and pitch, consistency of tempo and volume, and the length of melodic phrases, and also the social elements like the participation of the audience and the way a performance is structured; in this way, it intended to make the data of ethnomusicological research more quantifiable and grant it scientific legitimacy. However, the system also legitimized comparative methods, thus extending the debate regarding the ethics of a comparative approach.

== 1980s ==
The 1980s ushered in a heightened awareness of bias and representation in ethnomusicology, meaning that ethnomusicologists took into consideration the effects of biases they brought to their studies as (usually) outgroup members, as well as the implications of how they choose to represent the ethnography and music of the cultures they study. Historically, Western field workers dubbed themselves experts on foreign music traditions once they felt they had a handle on the music, but these scholars ignored differences in worldview, priority systems, and cognitive patterns, and thought that their interpretation was truth. This type of research contributed to a larger phenomenon called Orientalism."

It was also during that time that Clifford Geertz's concept of thick description spread from anthropology to ethnomusicology. In particular, ethnomusicologist Timothy Rice called for a more human-focused study of ethnomusicology, putting emphasis on the processes that bind music and society together in musical creation and performance. His model follows Alan Merriam's identification of the field as "the study of music in culture." Rice puts more focus on historical change as well as the role of the individual in music-making. In particular, Rice's model asks "how do people historically construct, socially maintain and individually create and experience music?" In addition to presenting new models of thought, Rice's ideas were also meant to unify the field of ethnomusicology into a more organized, cohesive field by providing an organized series of questions to address in the course of research.

Another concern that came to the forefront in the 1980s is known as reflexivity. The ethnomusicologist and his or her culture of study have a bidirectional, reflexive influence on one another in that it is possible not only for observations to affect the observer, but also for the presence of the observer to affect what they observe.

The awareness of the nature of oral tradition and the problems it poses for reliability of source came into discussion during the 1980s. The meaning of a particular song is in the kind of flux associated with any oral tradition, each successive performer bringing his or her own interpretation. Furthermore, regardless of original intended meaning, once a song is originally interpreted by the audience, recalled later in memory when recounting the performance to a researcher, interpreted by the researcher, and then interpreted by the researcher's audience, it can, and does, take on a variety of different meanings. The 1980s can be classified by the emergence of awareness of cultural bias, the reliability of different sources, and a general skepticism as regards the validity of the researcher's point of view and of the object of research itself.

== 1990s ==
By the late 1980s, the field of ethnomusicology had begun examining popular music and the effect of media on musics around the world. Several definitions of popular music exist but most agree that it is characterized by having widespread appeal. Peter Manuel adds to this definition by distinguishing popular music by its association with different groups of people, performances by musicians not necessarily trained or intellectual, and dispersion through broadcasting and recording. Theodor Adorno defined popular music by contrasting it from serious music, which is purposeful and generally cooperates within strictly structured rules and conventions. Popular music can operate less deliberately and focuses on creating a general effect or impression, usually focusing on emotion.

Although the music industry developed over several decades, popular music drew ethnomusicologists' attention by the 90s because a standardizing effect began to develop. The corporate nature surrounding popular music streamlined it into a framework that focused on slight deviations from the accepted norm, creating what Adorno calls "pseudo-individualism"; what the public would perceive as unique or organic would musically comply with standard, established musical conventions. Thus, a duality emerged from this standardization, an industry-driven manipulation of the public's tastes to give people what they want while simultaneously guiding them to it. In the case of rock music, while the genre may have grown out of politicized forces and another form of meaningful motivation, the corporate influence over popular music became integral to its identity that directing public taste became increasingly easier. Technological developments allowed for easy dispersion of western music, causing the dominance of western music into rural and urbanized areas across the globe. However, because popular music assumes such a corporatized role and therefore remains subject to a large degree of standardization, ambiguity exists whether the music reflects actual cultural values or those only of the corporate sector seeking economic profit. Because popular music developed such a dependent relationship with media and the corporations surrounding it, where record sales and profit indirectly shaped musical decisions, the superstar person became an important element of popular music. From the fame and economic success surrounding such superstars, subcultures continued to arise, such as the rock and punk movements, only perpetuated by the corporate machine that also shaped the musical aspect of popular music.

Musical interaction through globalization played a huge role in ethnomusicology in the 1990s. Musical change was increasingly discussed. Ethnomusicologists began looking into a 'global village', straying away from a specialized look at music within a specific culture. There are two sides to this globalization of music: on one hand it would bring more cultural exchange globally, but on the other hand it could facilitate the appropriation and assimilation of musics. Ethnomusicologists have approached this new combination of different styles of music within one music by looking at the musical complexity and the degree of compatibility. This Westernization and modernization of music created a new focus of study; ethnomusicologists began to look at how different musics interact in the 1990s.

== 2000s ==
By the 2000s, musicology (which had previously limited its focus almost exclusively to European art music), began to look more like ethnomusicology, with greater awareness of and consideration for sociocultural contexts and practices beyond analysis of art music compositions and biographical studies of major European composers.

Ethnomusicologists continued to deal with and consider the effects of globalization on their work. Bruno Nettl identifies Westernization and modernization as two concurrent and similar cultural trends that served to help streamline musical expression all over the world. While creeping globalization had an undeniable effect on cultural homogeneity, it also helped broaden musical horizons all over the world. Rather than simply lamenting the continuing assimilation of folk music of non-western cultures, many ethnomusicologists chose to examine exactly how non-western cultures dealt with the process of incorporating western music into their own practices to facilitate the survival of their previous traditions.

With the ongoing globalization of music, many genres influenced each other and elements from foreign music became more prevalent in mainstream popular music. Diaspora populations such as the Punjab population in England were studied due to the characteristics of their music showing signs of the effects of global media. Their music, like many other music of displaced cultures, was made up of elements from the folk music of their culture along with the popular music of their location. Through this process the idea of transnationalism in music occurred.

Additionally, postcolonial thought remained a focus of ethnomusicological literature. One example comes from Ghanaian ethnomusicologist Kofi Agawu; in Representing African Music: Postcolonial Notes, Queries, Positions, he details how the concept of "African rhythm" has been misrepresented – "African" music is not a homogenous body as it is often perceived by Western thought. Its differences from Western music are often considered deficiencies, and the emphasis on "African rhythm" prevalent throughout music scholarship prevents accurate comparison of other musical elements such as melody and harmony. According to Kofi Agawu book "Representing African Music " African harmony may be "as far developed as European harmony in the sixteenth century," but "Africans have not merely cultivated their sense of rhythm far beyond ours, but must have started with a superior sense of rhythm from the beginning". He is arguing against Ward's claim by stating that African music has its own sense of rhythm and tones. Their harmony based on their scale of rhythm is what makes their songs unique. Agawu also asserts that Ward's theory rejects the African Tonal Scale. Influenced by postcolonial thought theories, Agawu focuses on deconstructing the Eurocentric intellectual hegemony surrounding understanding African music and the notation of the music itself. Additionally, the new notational systems that have been developed specifically for African music further prevent accurate comparison due to the impossibility of applying these notations to Western music. Overall, Agawu implores scholars to search for similarities rather than differences in their examinations of African music, as a heightened exploration of similarities would be much more empowering and intellectually satisfying. This means by reexamining the role of European (through colonialism and imperialism) and other cultural influences have had on the history of "African" music as individual nations, tribes, and collectively as a continent. The emphasis on difference within music scholarship has led to the creation of "default grouping mechanisms" that inaccurately convey the music of Africa, such as claims that polymeter, additive rhythm and cross rhythm are prevalent throughout all African music. The actual complexity and sophistication of African music goes unexplored when scholars simply talk about it within these categories and move on. Agawu also calls for the direct empowerment of postcolonial African subjects within music scholarship, in response to attempts to incorporate native discourses into scholarship by Western authors that he believes have led to inaccurate representation and a distortion of native voices. Agawu worries of the possible implementation of the same Western ideals but with an "African" face, "in what we have, rather, are the views of a group of scholars operating within a field of discourse, an intellectual space defined by Euro-American traditions of ordering knowledge".

Currently, scholarship that may have historically been identified as ethnomusicology is now classified as sound studies.

== 2010s ==
=== Historical Approaches ===
The historical approach in ethnomusicology is a trend that believes in understanding the past in order to understand the present. It has been long recognized as an important part of ethnomusicology, but is now an increasingly important subfield. Viewing music as data reveals that due to new technology, huge amounts of musical data are available through recordings on video phones, social media, and digital collections on the internet such as the International Library of African Music (ILAM). The ILAM is a repository of thousands of recordings made since 1929, recordings which are mostly open access online. Historical research made using this resource is published in "African Music: Journal of the International Library of African Music" and includes titles such as, for example, "A failed showcase of empire? The gold coast police band, colonial record keeping, and a 1947 tour of Great Britain".

In 2018, David Garcia and Naoko Terauchi were co-winners of the Bruno Nettl award from the Society for Ethnomusicology. This annual award is granted "to recognize an outstanding publication contributing to or dealing with the history of the field of ethnomusicology, broadly defined, or with the general character, problems, and methods of ethnomusicology". David Garcia was awarded for the book Listening for Africa, which studies the movement between the 1930s and 1950s to relate black music in Cuba and the United States to Africa. This project was special because it relied on archival sources of data, which according to Garcia, is not a traditional practice in ethnomusicology. Naoko Terauchi was also awarded for historical research. Terauchi translated the texts from a Prussian doctor Leopold Müller in order to understand late nineteenth century Japanese court music (gagaku). This source was inaccessible for a long time due to the language barrier, but Terauchi's Japanese translation of the German text helped decode the history of gagaku.

=== Interdisciplinary and innovative research ===
The creative and interdisciplinary ethnomusicologists of today are consistently delving into new realms of ethnomusicology that could have never been predicted 30 years ago, much less incorporated into a wholistic definition of the field. Bonnie McConnell published a paper in 2017 about musical participation and health education in the Gambia (McConnell 2017). Participatory health programs are found to be more effective, and musical performances increase audience participation, such as at polio immunization events. The singers sang, "Eh yo, polio ka naa ali ye ala nyaato kuntu" (Eh, polio is coming, let's stop its progress), and members of the crowd were inspired to dance along and donate money in the name of public health. Music can be informative, and make informational events entertaining, and if successfully used to advance polio vaccination, can save lives.

=== Future ===
We are "living in an ecumenical age when the disciplines to which we are 'sub' are moving closer together," wrote Tim Rice in 1987. Richard Crawford responded that scholars indulge in both ecumenical, meaning inclusive, and sectarian thought. In 2017, the Society for Ethnomusicology (SEM) recognized that a trend of nativism and social exclusion within the United States and the world could threaten the values of ethnomusicology, values the SEM defines as inclusivity and respect for diversity. They have raised the question of whether the global political situation could cause a change in the way ethnomusicology is done in the future, or if the field would shrink as a result. They also mentioned concern that support for social science research and the number of tenure-track faculty positions at universities are dwindling.

== See also ==
- Category:Music archives
- Category:Music archives in the United States
- Category:Music archives in the United Kingdom
- Berliner Phonogramm-Archiv
