= Kurt Reinhard (musicologist) =

Kurt Reinhard (27 August 1914 – 18 July 1979) was a German musicologist and ethnomusicologist who specialised in Turkish music.

Born in Gießen, Germany, Reinhard studied musicology and composition at the University of Cologne from 1933 to 1935, and ethnology at Leipzig University and the Ludwig-Maximilians-Universität München from 1935 to 1936. He took his doctorate at the Ludwig-Maximilians-Universität München with a dissertation on Burmese music. From 1952 to 1968, he was a director of the Berliner Phonogramm-Archiv.

His chief area of interest in the field of ethnomusicology was the folk music of Turkey.

== Selected publications ==
- Types of Turkmenian Songs in Turkey, Journal of the International Folk Music Council 9, 1956
- On the problem of pre-pentatonic scales: particularly the third-second nucleus, Journal of the International Folk Music Council 10, 1958
- Türkische Musik, Berlin, 1962
- "Türkische Musik", in Musik in Geschichte und Gegenwart, 1966
- Musique de Turquie (in French, with Ursula Reinhard), Buchet/Chastel (Paris), 1996
