= Berliner Phonogramm-Archiv =

Collection of ethnomusicological recordings in Germany

Coordinates: 52.457°N 13.292°E

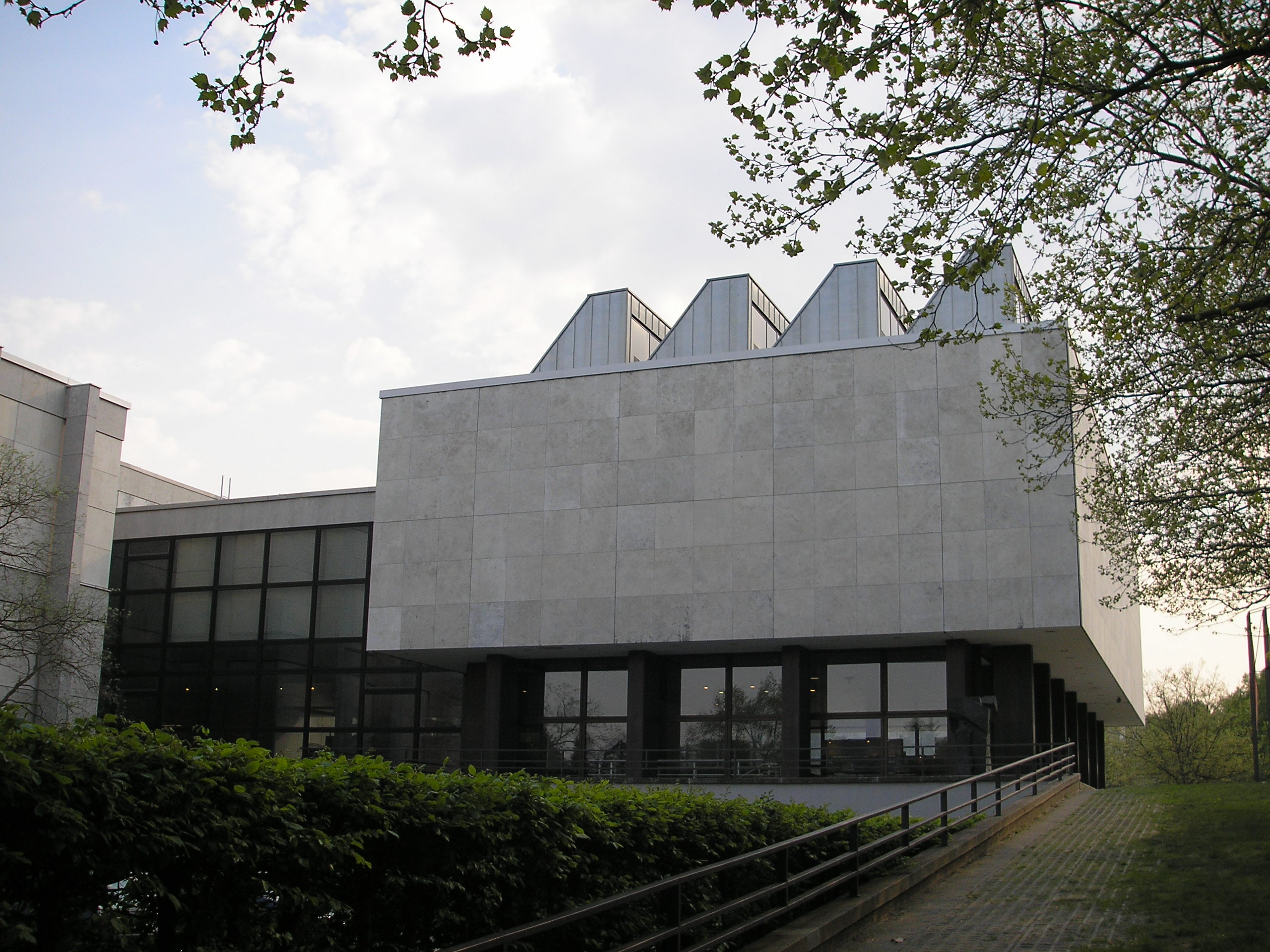
Former building of the Ethnological Museum in Berlin-Dahlem

The Berliner Phonogramm-Archiv is a collection of ethnomusicological recordings or world music, mostly on phonographic cylinders, assembled since 1900 in Berlin, Germany by the institution of the same name.

== The collection ==
The project was initiated in September 1900 by the psychology professor Carl Stumpf, after the visit to Germany of a music theater group from Siam, which Stumpf recorded on Edison cylinders with the assistance of the Berlin physician Otto Abraham. The archive's first director was Erich von Hornbostel, serving from 1905 to 1933. Its recordings, which comprise Edison cylinders and 78-rpm records of the traditional musics of the world, were first used for studies in comparative musicology, and now used for studies in ethnomusicology. The archive comprises approximately 350 collections, containing music from Africa (30%), North America (20%), Asia (20%), Australia and Oceania (12%), and Europe (10.4%), as well as multiregional collections (7.4%), which contain material from several continents. The last cylinder field recording in the collection was made in 1953.

In 1944 during the wartime invasion of Germany, around 90% of the collection was taken to Russia. In 1991, following the reunification of East and West Germany, the pre-1944 collections held by the Soviets were returned to the Ethnological Museum of Berlin. They include approximately 30,000 cylinders (original recordings and copies, positives and negatives) on which more than 16,000 distinct recordings are stored. In 1999, the cylinder recordings of the Berliner Phonogramm-Archiv were inscribed on UNESCO's Memory of the World Register.

== The institution ==
Initially, the Berliner Phonogramm-Archiv belonged to the Institute for Psychology of the Friedrich Wilhelm University in Berlin. Later, in the 1920s, it was relocated to the Berlin Conservatory, and then in the 1930s, it became part of the Museum für Völkerkunde (now the Ethnological Museum of Berlin), with which the Phonogramm-Archiv had earlier cooperated.

After the Second World War the collections of the Phonogramm-Archiv were divided. Most of its recordings were in East Germany, while the bulk of the corresponding documentation remained in the West. Both sides viewed the collection to be mainly lost. In West Berlin, Kurt Reinhard rebuilt an archive at the Ethnological Museum. New recordings were made, mostly on tape. Due to this, and the fact that by this time the archive had also assembled an important collection of musical instruments, the collection was renamed in the 1960s as "Department for Ethnomusicology" (musikethnologische Abteilung).

The Department for Ethnomusicology continued to collect music, with a focus on traditional music from all areas of the world, so that by its 100th anniversary, it claimed to house an estimated 150,000 recordings An international conference called "100 Years Berlin Phonogramm-Archive: Retrospective, Perspective and Interdisciplinary Approaches of the Sound Archives of the World" was held from September 27 to October 1, 2000, at the Ethnological Museum of Berlin.

Today, the Phonogramm archive forms part of the Musikethnologie department of the Ethnological Museum of Berlin, part of the Berlin State Museums (Staatliche Museen zu Berlin) under the Prussian Cultural Heritage Foundation. In 2021, the museum moved to the newly built Humboldt Forum in the center of Berlin. The Berlin Phonogram Archive is now part of the museum's media department under the direction of Maurice Mengel.

== Discography ==
- 2001 - Music! The Berlin Phonogramm-Archive, 1900-2000. 4-CD set. Mainz, Germany: Wergo.

== See also ==
- Deutsches Musikarchiv

== Bibliography ==
- Koch, Lars-Christian; Wiedmann, Albrecht; Ziegler, Susanne (2004). The Berlin Phonogramm-Archiv: A treasury of sound recordings. Acoustical science and technology 25(4), 227–231, ISSN 1346-3969
- Simon, Arthur, ed. (2000). Das Berliner Phonogramm-Archiv 1900–2000. Sammlungen der traditionellen Musik der Welt. Berlin: VWB. ISBN 3-86135-680-5.
- Stumpf, Carl (1908). Das Berliner Phonogrammarchiv. Internationale Wochenschrift für Wissenschaft, Kunst und Technik 2(8), 225-246
- Ziegler, Susanne (2006). Die Wachszylinder des Berliner Phonogramm-Archivs. Ethnologisches Museum Berlin. Bd NF 73. Abt. Musikethnologie, Medien-Technik und Berliner Phonogramm-Archiv Bd XII. Berlin: Staatliche Museen. ISBN 3-88609-527-4.
