= Sound studies =

Interdisciplinary field of study

Sound studies is an interdisciplinary field that to date has focused largely on the emergence of the concept of "sound" in Western modernity, with an emphasis on the development of sound reproduction technologies.

== History of the field ==
The field first emerged in venues like the journal Social Studies of Science by scholars working in science and technology studies and communication studies; it has however greatly expanded and now includes a broad array of scholars working in anthropology, architecture, cinema studies, deaf studies, literary studies, musicology, sound art, and many other fields besides. Important studies have focused on the idea of a "soundscape", architectural acoustics, nature sounds, the history of aurality in Western philosophy and nineteenth-century Colombia, Islamic approaches to listening, the voice, studies of deafness, loudness, and related topics. One root of the field comes from environmental movements of the 1970s and the World Soundscape Project at Simon Fraser University, evidenced in texts such as R. Murray Schafer's The Tuning of the World (The Soundscape) (1977) and Hildegarde Westerkamp's "Soundwalking" (1974). Building from this work, and texts like Jacques Attali's Noise: The Political Economy of Music (1985) and Ingrid Monson's Saying Something: Jazz Improvisation and Interaction (1996), another scholarly fluorescence came in the early 2000s, when the field began calling itself "sound studies." Key studies from this period include Trevor Pinch and Frank Truocco's Analog Days: The Invention and Impact of the Moog Synthesizer (2002), Emily Thompson's The Soundscape of Modernity (2002), Jonathan Sterne's The Audible Past (2003), Richard Cullen Rath's How Early America Sounded (2003), and Fred Moten's In the Break (2003).

Initial work in the field was criticized for focusing mainly on white male inventors in Euro-America. Consequently, the field is currently in a period of expansion, with important texts coming out in recent years on sound, listening, and hearing as they relate to race, gender, and colonialism.

== Hearing and listening ==
Two significant categories to what we hear and pay attention to are natural and technological sounds. According to R. Murray Schafer (through a survey of quotes in the literature), the proportion of nature sounds heard and noticed among European authors has decreased over the past two centuries from 43% to 20%, but not for North America, where it has stayed around 50%. Additionally, the proportion of technological sounds mentioned in literature has stayed around 35% for Europe, but decreased in North America. While technological increases have not been sonically noticed, the decrease in silence has been noticed, from 19% to 9%.

For the idea of listening, objects can be considered auditorily as compared to visually. The objects that are able to be experienced by sight and by sound can be thought of in a venn diagram, with mute and visible objects in the vision category, with aural and invisible objects in the sound category, and aural and visible objects in the overlapping category. Objects that do not fall into a specific category can be considered beyond the horizons of sound and sight. The common denominator for aural objects is movement.

Three modes of listening have been articulated by sound theorist Michel Chion: causal listening, semantic listening, and reduced listening. Causal listening, the most common, consists of listening in order to gather information about the sound's source, or its cause. Sound in this case is informational and can be used to recognize voices, determine distance, or understand differences between humans and machines. Semantic listening is when one listens in order to understand the encoded meaning of the sound such as in speech or other sounds that are imbued with meaning such as morse code or user interface feedback sounds. Reduced listening focuses on the traits of the sound itself regardless of cause and meaning.

Jean-Luc Nancy's short book, Listening, distinguishes hearing from listening. Hearing is a sonic attentiveness to meaning and understanding while listening is a radical sonic receptivity to what is other and unexpected. "To be listening," he writes, "is always to be on the edge of meaning, or in an edge meaning of extremity."

For Nina Sun Eidsheim, especially in The Race of Sound, we are trained to listen for what we hear and as a result, what we hear affirms our initial expectations. In response, she calls for us to listen to our listening, and redirect our attention to ourselves, asking not what or who or what kind of subject I'm hearing, but "Who am I, who hears this?"

== Spaces, sites and scapes ==
Sound is heard through space. But this defining of sound and space is further nuanced by their interdependent existence, creation, and dissolution. This idea of the acoustic environment and its social inextricability has become a source of interest within the field of sound studies. Critical to this contemporary discussion of the symbiotic social space and sonic space is R. Murray Schafer's concept of the soundscape. Schafer uses the term soundscape to describe "a total appreciation of the sonic environment," and, through soundscape studies, attempts to more holistically understand "the relationship between man and the sounds of his environment and what happens when those sounds change". In understanding the environment as events being heard, the soundscape is indicative of the social conditions and characteristics that create it. In industrialized cities, the soundscape is industrial noises, in a rainforest the soundscape is the sound of nature, and in an empty space the soundscape is silence. Moreover, the soundscape is argued to foretell future societal trends. The soundscape is not just representative of the environment which surrounds it; it comprises an essential part of the environment's perception and existence. The soundscape is the environment on a wavelength that is auditory rather than tactile or visible, but very much as real.

Schafer's concept of the soundscape has become a hallmark of sound studies and is referenced, built upon, and criticized by writers from a wide breadth of disciplines and perspectives. Common themes explored through the analysis of the soundscape are the conflict between nature and industry, the impact of technology on sound production and consumption, the issue of cultural sound values and the evolution of acoustics, and the power dynamics of silence and noise.

== Literary Sound Studies ==
Literary sound studies is a subcategory of sound studies that explores the relationship between sound, listening, and literature. Literary sound studies posits that textual forms of expression can be sonic and therefore, reading is not a "silent" activity. Literary sound studies scholars have theorized that various forms of listening function as critical methodologies of understanding literary works and their relationship to cultural and historical contexts from which they arise. Literary sound studies explores different forms of listening and the manner in which sounds are internalized through the act of reading is considered to be listening. This conversation also relates to physiological processes in addition to aesthetic acts. Understanding reading as a neurologically sounding experience allows literary sound scholars to find sonic significance in any text, not just those that explicitly describe sounds or have a vocal aspect to them. This hinges on the fact that reading activates parts of the brain closely related to listening. Just as literature can be read in terms of sound, literary sound studies also shows that the larger field benefits from literary forms of inquiry, especially because writing provides key critical context for sound and all writing possesses sonic properties.

Literary scholars have long considered the sound of poetry, plays, and oral storytelling, which remains a key aspect of the field's approach to sound. Conversations about the aurality of literature have also long been central for literary scholars who study Black writers and thinkers, particularly how Black artists in the Americas and the Caribbean incorporated diasporic forms of oral storytelling and performance practices into their written texts, defying attempts by white enslavers to ban both African cultural practices and written literacy for enslaved people. Henry Louis Gates's conception of the "trope of the talking book" and the doublevoicedness of Black American texts in The Signifying Monkey (1988) are examples of Black literary studies' engagement with textual sonics. Literary works frequently referenced by sound studies scholars working in the Black diasporic tradition include Frederick Douglass's Narrative of the Life of Frederick Douglass, W.E.B. Du Bois’s The Souls of Black Folk (1903), Zora Neale Hurston’s Their Eyes Were Watching God (1929), and Ralph Ellison’s Invisible Man (1956).

Some key interventions that literary sound studies has made involve the importance of cultural and historical specificity to interpreting sound in print,the deep connections between musical composition and literary forms, and the role of the novel as a uniquely suited literary form for representing soundscapes and historical modes of listening and interpreting sound. Julie Huntington uses the phrase "texted sound" to represent how literary works offer sonic experience. Carter Mathes describes how the sonic appears in printed works as "literary sound." Alexander Weheliye describes novels with intensified sonic experiences as "literary sound recordings" and Jennifer Lynn Stoever uses "aural imagery" to describe literary representations of sound that authors intend to activate their readers' inner hearing, similar to how musicians "sight read" notes. Njelle Hamilton has offered the term "phonotope" to understand how novels represent and narrate music and musical listening, particularly in the Caribbean.

== Transduce and record ==
The commercialisation of recorded music has influenced perceptions of authenticity in sound recordings. Recordings have enabled the continued commercial circulation of music by deceased artists, extending the availability of their work beyond their lifetimes. The renewed use and distribution of older recordings has also contributed to new listening practices and forms of audience engagement.

In a Memorex commercial involving Ella Fitzgerald and Chuck Mangione, Fitzgerald is unable to discern the difference between a live performance and a recording of Mangione playing the trumpet. This presents a scene to viewers which sells cassette tapes as ideal objects of high-fidelity, auditory preservation. What was once an autonomic experience of memory which integrated visual and auditory stimuli (live music) has become a consumable item which popularizes and commodifies sonic memory explicitly.

Part of this shift in the dynamics of recorded sound has to do with a desire for noise reduction. This desire is representative of a mode of recording referred to by scholar James Lastra as "telephonic:" a mode in which sound is regarded as having hierarchically important qualities, with clarity and intelligibility being the most important aspects. This contrasts with phonographic recording, which generates a "point of audition" from which a sense of space can be derived, sacrificing quality for uniqueness and fidelity. This technique is often used in movies to demonstrate how a character hears something (such as muffled voices through a closed door). Through various forms of media, recorded music affects our perceptions and consumptive practices more often than we realize.

== See also ==
- Audiophile
