= Claibourne =

Claibourne could refer to one of many places.

== United States ==
- Claibourne Township, Union County, Ohio
  - Claibourne, Ohio

== Fictional ==
- Claibourne, part of the Kingdom of Gwynedd in the Deryni novels of Katherine Kurtz.
