= Lunda, Ohio =

- Unincorporated community
- Location within Ohio
- Coordinates: 40°21′53″N 83°30′42″W
- Country: United States
- State: Ohio
- Counties: Union
- Elevation: 1,093 ft (333 m)
- Time zone: UTC-5 (Eastern (EST))
  - Summer (DST): UTC-4 (EDT)
- ZIP code: 43358
- Area codes: 937, 326
- GNIS feature ID: 1062863

Lunda is an unincorporated community in Liberty Township, Union County, Ohio, United States. It is located at the intersection of Lunda Road (Union County Highway 252) and Perkins Road (Union County Highway 248), about three miles southeast of West Mansfield.

The Lunda Post office was established on August 18, 1896, but was discontinued on February 14, 1906. The mail service is now sent through the West Mansfield branch.
