= North Union Local School District =

School district in Ohio, United States

Address
- 12920 State Route 739 Richwood, Ohio, 43344; United States

District information
- Type: Public
- Grades: PreK–12
- NCES District ID: 3905033

Students and staff
- Students: 1,436
- Teachers: 76.74
- Staff: 204.0
- Student–teacher ratio: 18.71

Other information
- Website: www.n-union.k12.oh.us

North Union Local School District or North Union Local Schools is a school district headquartered in Richwood, Ohio. It operates North Union Elementary School, North Union Middle School, and North Union High School.

Most of the district is in Union County, where it includes all of Claibourne, Jackson, and Washington townships, most of Leesburg and York townships, and part of Taylor Township. The district extends into portions of Scioto and Thompson townships in Delaware County.
