= North Union School District =

North Union School District may refer to:

- North Union Community School District - Iowa
- North Union Local School District - Ohio
