= Peoria, Ohio =

- Unincorporated community
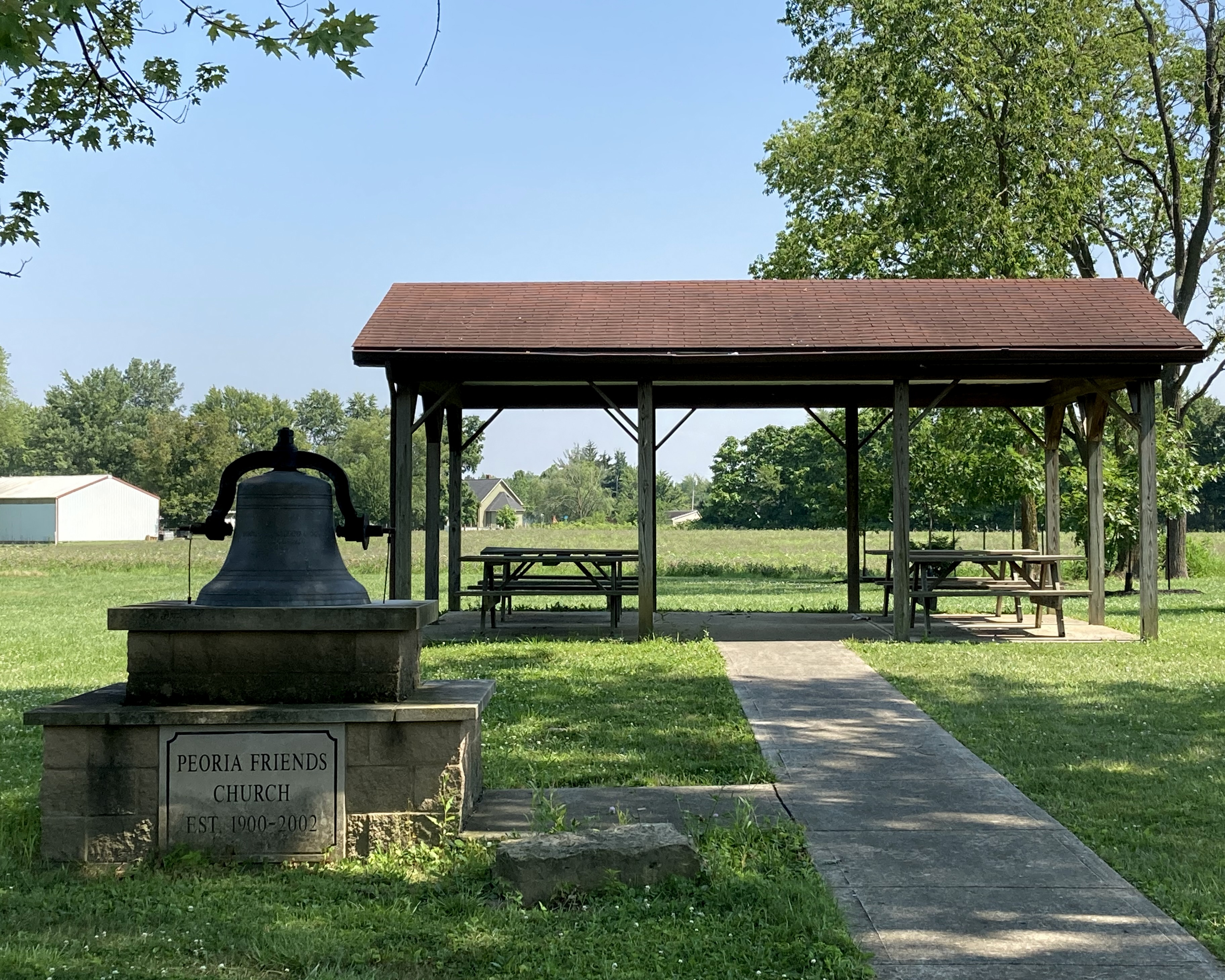
- A park in Peoria

- Location within Ohio
- Coordinates: 40°18′50″N 83°26′45″W
- Country: United States
- State: Ohio
- Counties: Union
- Elevation: 1,027 ft (313 m)
- Time zone: UTC-5 (Eastern (EST))
  - Summer (DST): UTC-4 (EDT)
- ZIP codes: 43067, 43040
- Area codes: 937, 326
- GNIS feature ID: 1049075

Peoria is an unincorporated community in Liberty Township, Union County, Ohio, United States. It is located along Raymond Road, about 1.75 mi (2.82 km) south of Raymond and 6.5 mi (10.46 km) northwest of Marysville.

A post office was established in Peoria on September 26, 1872; it was closed on August 11, 1967. The mail service is now sent through the Columbus regional mail sorting facility, and distributed through the Marysville and Raymond local post offices.

== Origins ==
The town was originally platted by Joseph K. Richey in 1870. His original plat included 28 "town lots" most of which were 66 ft (20.12 m) by 165 ft (50.29 m) in size (in the parlance of the day, 4 poles wide and 10 poles deep), 1/4 acre (0.10 ha) per lot. The town was established at the junction of the newly built Marysville-Newton Road (Raymond was then called Newton) and the Atlantic and Great Western Railroad. By the early 1880s, the Ohio Central Railroad (which became the Toledo and Ohio Central Railway) had built a northwest–southeast line that crossed the southwest-northeast A&GW line. The Peoria railroad station, situated at the grade crossing of the two rail lines, was the only depot in Liberty Township that could accommodate both freight and passengers. The station also featured a water tank and a coaling tower to service the steam engines of the time. Remnants of the foundations of these structures are still visible today.

Largely because of the railroad station and the post office established there in 1872, Peoria quickly became a commercial center, featuring stores, churches, warehouses, hotels, small businesses—including a barber shop and a mill—a grange hall and a public school. The population of the village was estimated at 150 in 1910.

== Peoria today ==
The commercial enterprises of the past in Peoria no longer exist. The school and the churches are also gone. With the closing of the post office in 1967, followed by the abandonment of the Erie-Lackawanna rail line (formerly the A&GW) in the early 1970s, the community became primarily residential, with commerce flowing to nearby Raymond, Broadway, and Marysville.
