= Dipple, Ohio =

- Unincorporated community
- Location within Ohio
- Coordinates: 40°12′08″N 83°19′01″W
- Country: United States
- State: Ohio
- Counties: Union
- Elevation: 984 ft (300 m)
- Time zone: UTC-5 (Eastern (EST))
  - Summer (DST): UTC-4 (EDT)
- ZIP code: 43040
- Area codes: 937, 326
- GNIS feature ID: 1062732

Dipple is an unincorporated community in Paris Township, Union County, Ohio, United States. It is located about 2 miles (3.2 km) southeast of Marysville along U.S. Route 33 where Scottslawn Road intersects with the railroad tracks. The location of the original community is now wholly located on the Scotts Miracle-Gro Company property.
