= Claibourne, Ohio =

- Unincorporated community
- Location within Ohio
- Coordinates: 40°23′17″N 83°20′57″W
- Country: United States
- State: Ohio
- Counties: Union
- Elevation: 978 ft (298 m)
- Time zone: UTC-5 (Eastern (EST))
  - Summer (DST): UTC-4 (EDT)
- ZIP code: 43344
- Area code: 740
- GNIS feature ID: 1060971

Claibourne is an unincorporated community in Claibourne Township, Union County, Ohio, United States. It is located at the intersection of Claibourne Road and Bethlehem-Claibourn Road.

== History ==
Claibourne was platted in 1881 when the railroad was extended to that point. A post office was established at Claibourne in 1879, and remained in operation until 1947.
