= Allen Center, Ohio =

- Unincorporated community
- Location within Ohio
- Coordinates: 40°14′30″N 83°28′41″W
- Country: United States
- State: Ohio
- Counties: Union
- Elevation: 1,053 ft (321 m)
- Time zone: UTC-5 (Eastern (EST))
  - Summer (DST): UTC-4 (EDT)
- ZIP code: 43040
- Area codes: 937, 326
- GNIS feature ID: 1060818

Allen Center is an unincorporated community in Allen Township, Union County, Ohio, United States. It is located at the intersection of Allen Center and Bear Swamp roads.

== History ==
Allen Center was laid out around 1849. A post office was established at Allen Center in 1851, and remained in operation until 1863.
