= Union County, Ohio =

County in Ohio, United States

- County
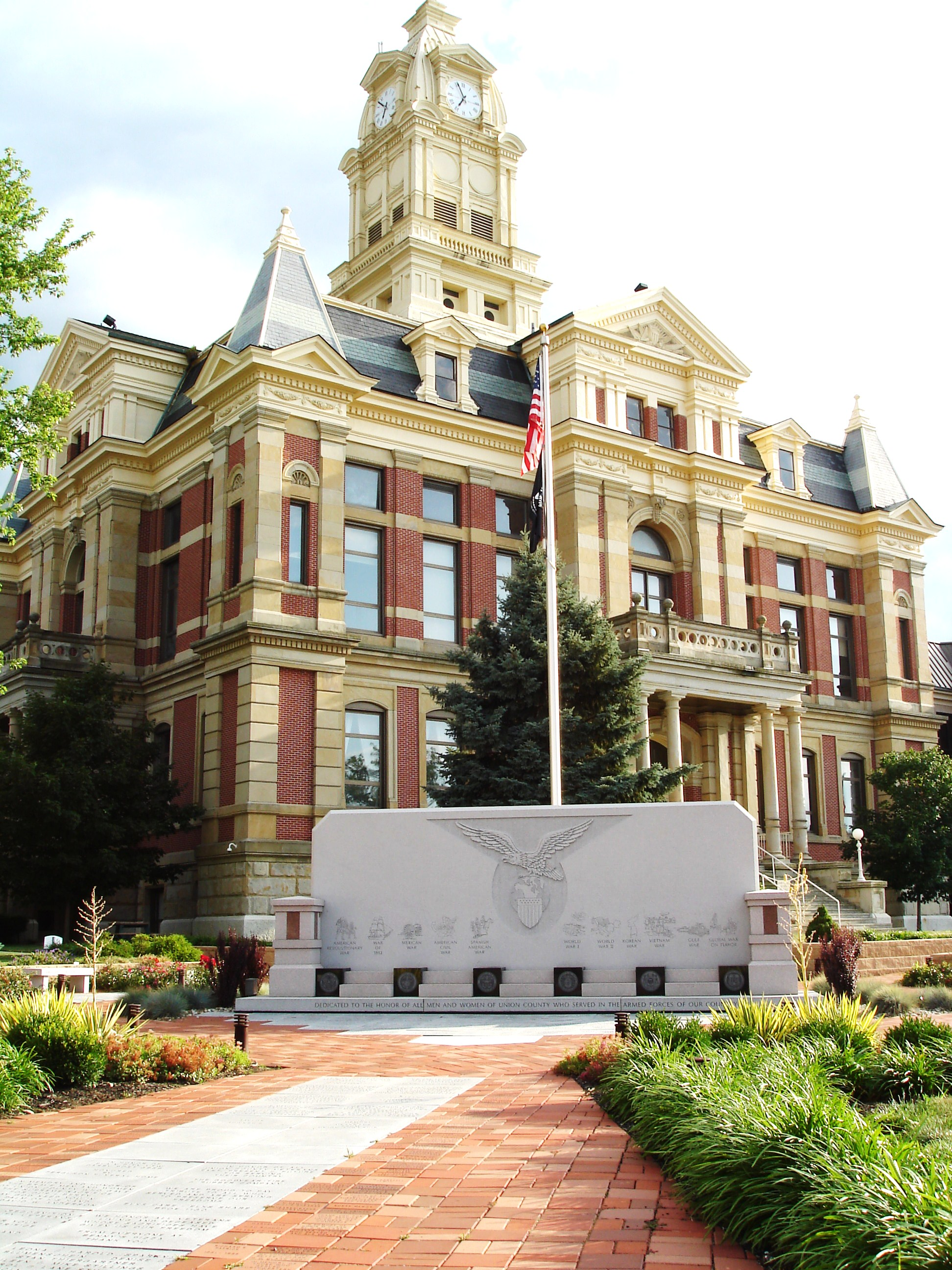
- Union County Courthouse

- Flag Seal

- Location within the U.S. state of Ohio
- Coordinates: 40°19′N 83°22′W
- Country: United States
- State: Ohio
- Founded: April 1, 1820
- Named for: formed from the union of parts of surrounding counties
- Seat: Marysville
- Largest city: Marysville

Area
  - Total: 437 sq mi (1,130 km^{2})
  - Land: 432 sq mi (1,120 km^{2})
  - Water: 5.1 sq mi (13 km^{2}) 1.2%

Population (2020)
  - Total: 62,784
  - Estimate (2025): 73,446 ▲
  - Density: 140/sq mi (54/km^{2})
- Time zone: UTC−5 (Eastern)
  - Summer (DST): UTC−4 (EDT)
- Congressional district: 4th
- Website: www.unioncountyohio.gov

Union County is a county located in the U.S. state of Ohio. As of the 2020 census, the population was 62,784. Its county seat is Marysville. Its name is reflective of its origins, being the union of portions of Franklin, Delaware, Madison, and Logan counties. Union County is part of the Columbus, Ohio Metropolitan Statistical Area.

== History ==
=== Early history ===
Union County has been under the rule of three countries in its history: France, England, and the present-day United States. It was discovered by the French explorer La Salle, along with traders and missionaries who accompanied him. After the French and Indian War, the Treaty of Paris of 1763 placed the area under British rule. Following the American Revolution, in 1783, the area would eventually become known as the Northwest Territory and part of the United States.

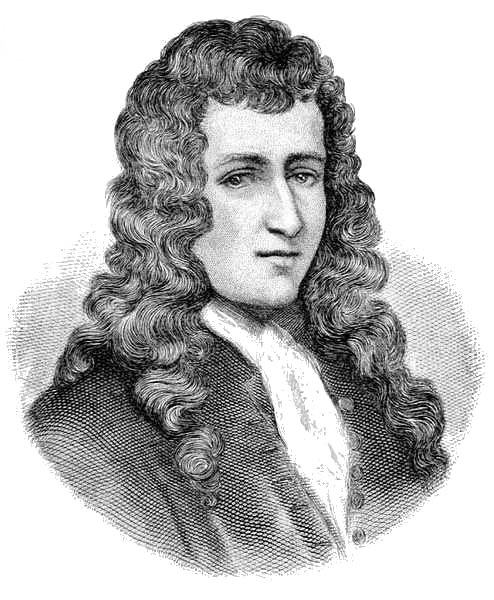
Robert de La Salle, French explorer of pre-modern Ohio

After the American Revolution, former soldiers from New England poured into Ohio after being granted land by the government. They surveyed the land, and sought to develop a state between Lake Erie and the Ohio River. Their proposals for the governance of the territory led to the passage of the Ordinance of 1787, which guided the establishment of states within the Northwestern Territory. Bitter struggles with American Indians over the next decades would follow, culminating with the battle of Tippecanoe in 1811, which saw the final defeat of the American Indian tribes in Ohio led by Tecumseh. A notable victim of the warring between the settlers and Indians was Jonathan Alder, who resided in and around the Union County area throughout his life.

=== Original settlements ===
The first town laid out in the county was North Liberty, established by Lucas Sullivant in 1797, but the first settlement in the county was made in present-day Jerome township by Joshua and James Ewing in 1798. An important settlement made in the county was by Abraham Amrine, of Swiss descent and a revolutionary soldier, in 1817, two miles (3.2 km) northwest of Marysville.

=== Formation ===
As part of negotiations with Virginia, who had claimed land in Ohio, to sign the Articles of Confederation, the United States granted them claims to land in Ohio which became known as the Virginia Military District. Union County was in this district. In 1803, Ohio became an independent state.

After lobbying by Col. James Curry, who represented the area in legislature at the time and a resident of what would become Jerome township, Union County was established by the Ohio legislature, and became official in 1820 with the appointment of the original commissioners: Stephen Bell, Reuben Wallace, and John Huston. The county commissioners eventually established the townships, including Union (1820), Darby (1820), Mill Creek (1820), Jerome (1821), Paris (1821), Liberty (1822), Leesburg (1825), Allen (1827), Jackson (1829), York (1834), Washington (1836), Dover (1839), Claibourne (1834), and Taylor (1849), while they designated Marysville as the county seat.

The town of Milford Center was established in 1816 by George Reed, Marysville in 1819 by Samuel Culbertson, Richwood in 1832 by Philip Plumber, Kingsville in 1834, Somerville in 1835, Watkins and Arbelia in 1838, Newton in 1838 by David Paul, York Center in 1841, Frankfort in 1846, Unionville in 1847, Pharisburg in 1847, New California in 1853, Dover in 1854, Union Center in 1863, Broadway in 1865, Pottersburg in 1869, Peoria in 1870, Magnetic Springs in 1879, and Claibourne in 1881.

==== County seat ====
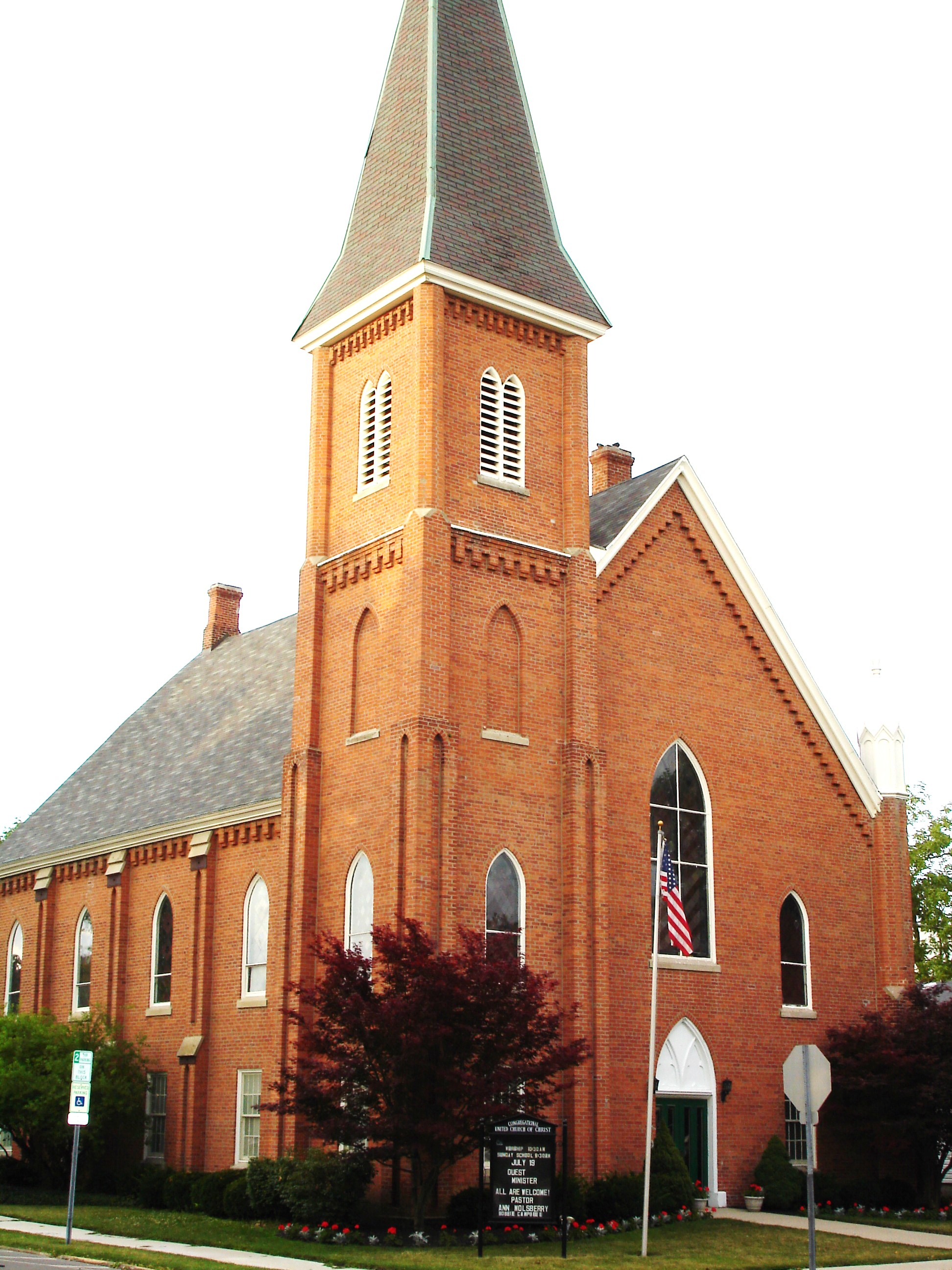
First Congregational Church, Marysville

After the organization of the county by the Ohio Legislature, Marysville was designated as the seat of Union County. The first recorded meeting of the commissioners was in 1820. Between 1835 and 1840, a courthouse was constructed. Eventually, a new courthouse would be built in Marysville, dedicated on January 27, 1883. This is the present courthouse today.

In 1849, a county infirmary was authorized. The first county jail was a log structure that sat on the southside of East Center street, in the rear of the courthouse. Eventually, a new jail was authorized by the commissioners and built in the 1870s. In 1878, the county purchased a 10-ton safe for the treasury, that eventually was moved into courthouse.

The first county fair was held in 1847 in Marysville, in the public square. In 1852, the Agriculture Society moved the fair to the current location, on the northside of town.

In 1866, the Union County Teachers' Institute was organized in Marysville, with Franklin Wood serving at the first President. In 1882, the Normal School was organized by J.S. Wharton, which specialized in instructing future teachers.

=== Early growth ===
==== Infrastructure ====
The county lacked transportation infrastructure until 1812, when the first known highway named Post Road was constructed across the southern portion of the county. In 1844, the legislature by act created a free turnpike that ran from Columbus to Bellefontaine, passing through Marysville, originally costing $230,000. This road eventually became what is known as U.S. Route 33 today. In 1853, the Marysville and Essex Plank Road Company was organized and constructed a road from Marysville north, through Pharisburg. The company sold capital stock for $30,000, and this road today is known as State Rt. 4. By 1915, the county had built 705 miles (1,135 km) of roadways, the most of any county in the state for its size.

Richwood

By the late 19th century and into the 20th century, the county began developing its electricity infrastructure. By 1915, electricity lines ran from Magnetic Springs to Richwood.

The county's first railroad was constructed between 1850 and 1854, a line that ran from Springfield to Delaware and crossed through the county in Milford Center, Marysville, Irwin, and Dover. A railroad called the New York, Pennsylvania, and Ohio line was chartered in 1851 and would eventually run through Union County with station points at Richwood, Woodland, Claibourne, Pottersburg, Broadway, and Peoria. The Columbus and Bellefontaine railroad was incorporated in 1878 and had station points in the county at Marysville. The Toledo and Central railroad ran from Columbus north through the county, with station points at Marysville, Peoria, and Raymond.

The first telegraph line was completed in 1859, which connected Marysville with the world via Springfield.

==== Agriculture ====
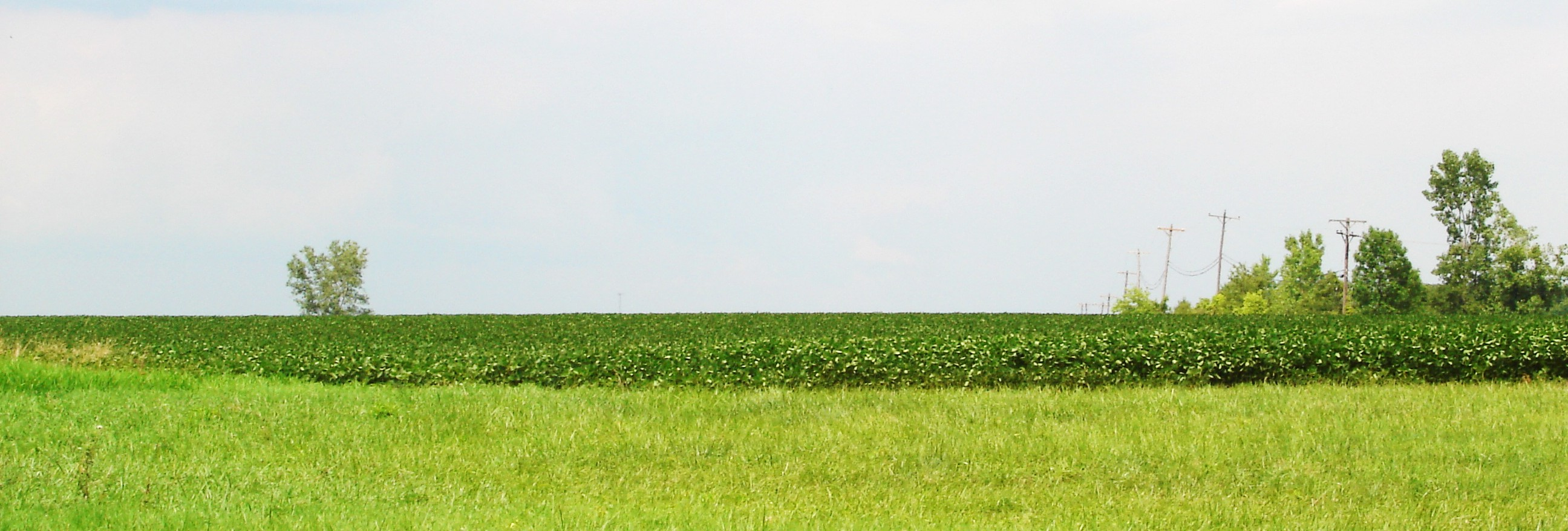
New California

Because of the fertile soil in Union County, the county's farmers required minimal fertilizer. There were hundreds of farms in the county in its early stages. The crops grown in Union County's early history included wheat, oats, corn, Irish potatoes, clover and alfalfa. The county was a large producer of milk, butter, sugar, syrup, apples, and pears.

In 1911, 270,000 acres (1,100 km^{2}) were owned in Union County, with 85,000 cultivated for farming. The farms had a total of 9,355 horses, 8,110 milk cows with 14,000 total cattle, 43,727 sheep, and 32,000 hogs. 312,000 pounds (142,000 kg) of wool was produced that year.

==== Commerce and industry ====
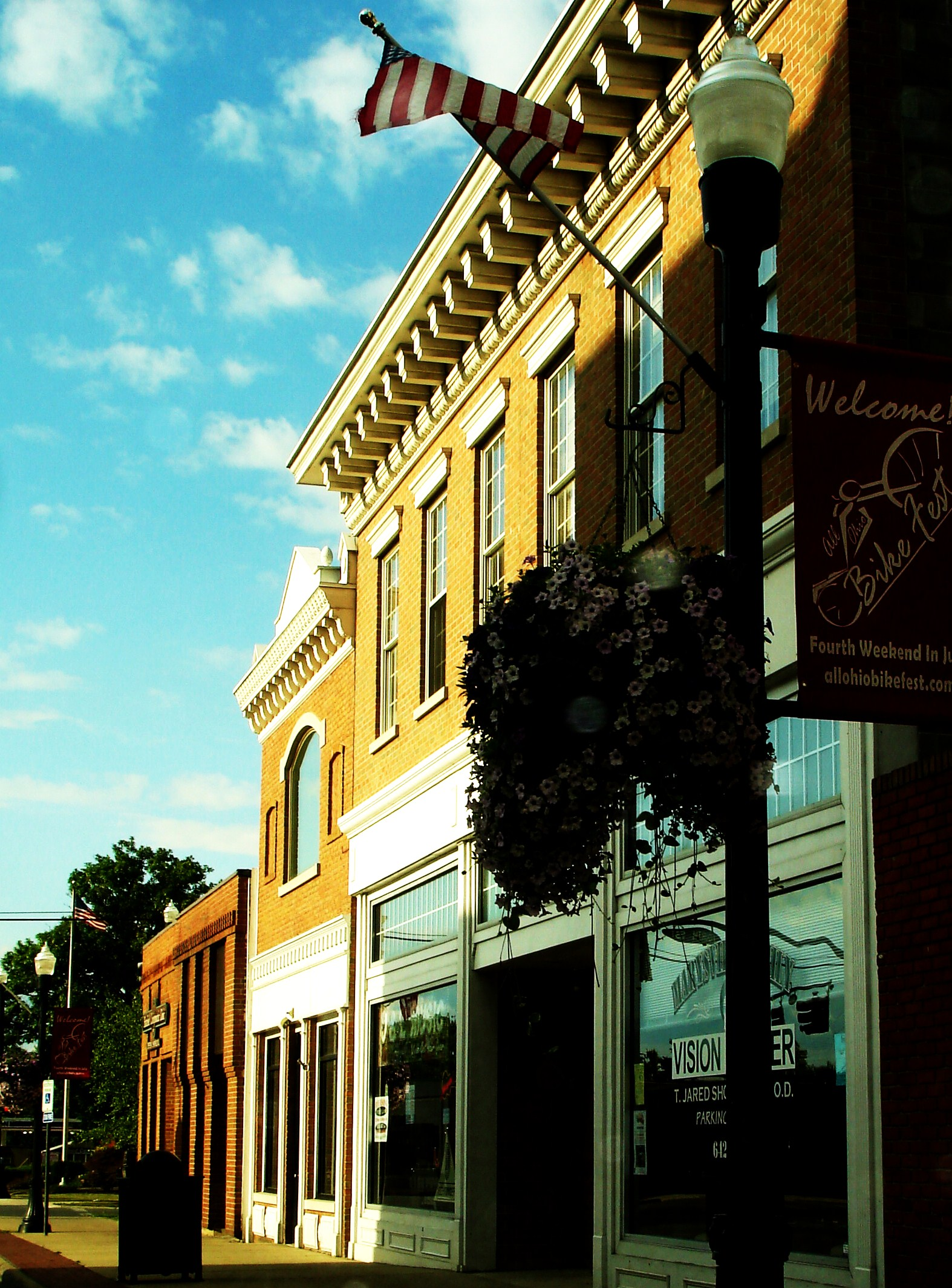
Uptown Marysville

Union County was home to many industries in its original days from hotels, tanneries, distilleries, breweries, mills, asheries, manufacturers, energy production, banks, grocers, and retailers, among others. Marysville's industrial roots can be traced back to many early companies. Among those were the Marysville Pearlash Factory, an ashery founded in 1848, which by 1874 was the largest in the United States. The first steam-grist mill was erected in 1856 by Saxton and Casil. In 1867, Miller & Snodgrass constructed a flour mill. In 1874, Marysville Butter Tub and Spoke Company was incorporated with $50,000.

A wool company, Woodbury & Welsh, constructed a brick factory on the northeast part of town in 1864, and a brewery was built in 1866 on the eastside. In 1868, O.M. Scotts and Company was organized. In 1871, the Marysville Cheese Manufacturing Company was built on the eastside. Many carriage manufacturing companies were placed in Marysville, including Bauer, Schepper & Devine in 1882, City Carriage Works in 1871, and L. E. Helium in 1874.

In 1875, Rice, Fleck & Co. opened a lumberyard. The Marysville Gas Light Company was incorporated in 1878 following almost a decade of the city using gasoline for lighting.

Richwood was home to hotels such as the Parsons House and Beem House. Large mills in Richwood included Beem and Biddle, Loveless, Howe, and Bishop, and S. M. and A. J. Blake. There were large tile manufacturers, and a plethora of commercial and industrial interests including jewelers, furniture retailers, and lumber yards.

Milford Center was home to mills, distilleries, tanneries, and companies such as the Milford Center Lumber and Supply Company, Ohio Elevator and Grain Company, Robinson and Richter Company, and Childs and Cover, a carriage manufacturer.

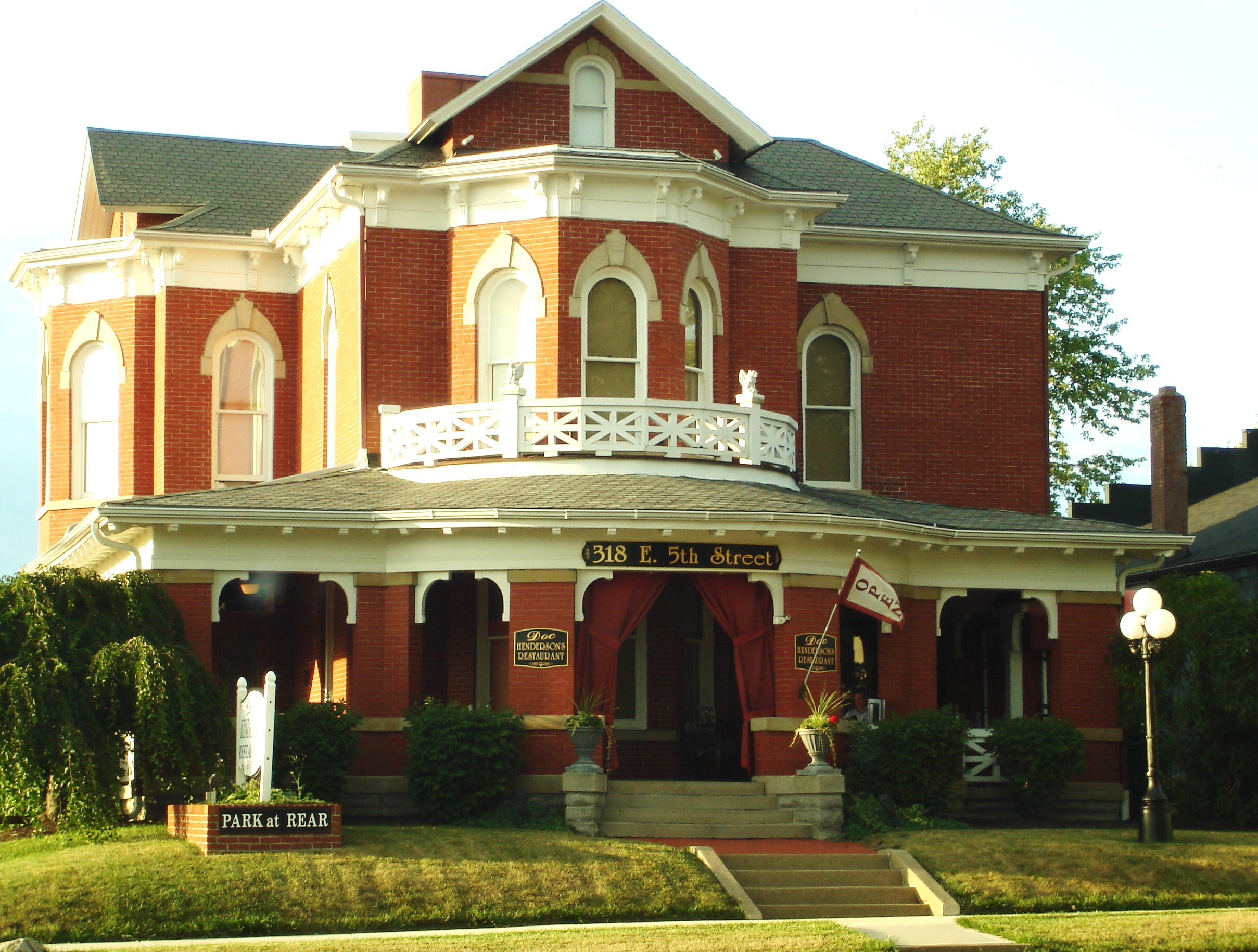
Dr. Henderson's house, now a restaurant, Marysville

Magnetic Springs, following the discovery of natural healing waters, became a tourist haven in the late 19th century until the innovation of modern medicine in the early 20th century. Tourists from all over the world visited the springs and stayed at resorts such as "The Park" and "The Columbus". "The Park" was home to the "Sager Sanitarium Bath".

==== Legal ====
Union County was home to many notable jurists in its early history, including John F. Kinney, who practiced in Union County in 1836 and eventually became a supreme court justice in Iowa and later a congressman from Utah. Edward Stillings grew up near Milford Center and was a graduate of Harvard, and became one of the top jurists in the country, practicing before the United States Supreme Court and helping to form the legal code of Kansas in the 1870s. James Wallace Robinson was a native of Union County and went on to become a U.S. congressman in 1872. James E. Robinson, a native of Union County, would eventually become an Ohio Supreme Court justice.

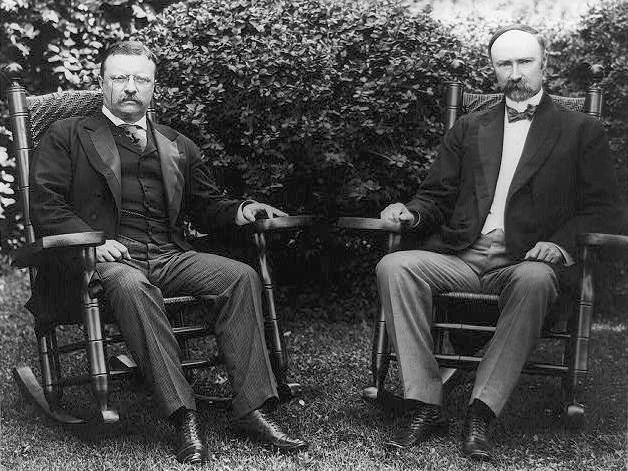
Union County native and U.S. Vice President Charles W. Fairbanks, right, with U.S. President Theodore Roosevelt, left.

Otway Curry was a nationally known poet who also became a jurist in 1840. Hylas Sabine graduated from Harvard in 1863 and practiced law in the county. Ulysses Cole, the son of Judge P.B. Cole, attended Harvard, practiced law with his father in 1867, and after being elected to the legislature in Indiana, became Deputy United States Assessor for Internal Revenue. Joseph Kennedy was admitted to the bar in 1871, and would become mayor of Marysville. Charles W. Fairbanks was admitted to the bar in 1874 and went on to become a United States Vice President.

==== Media ====
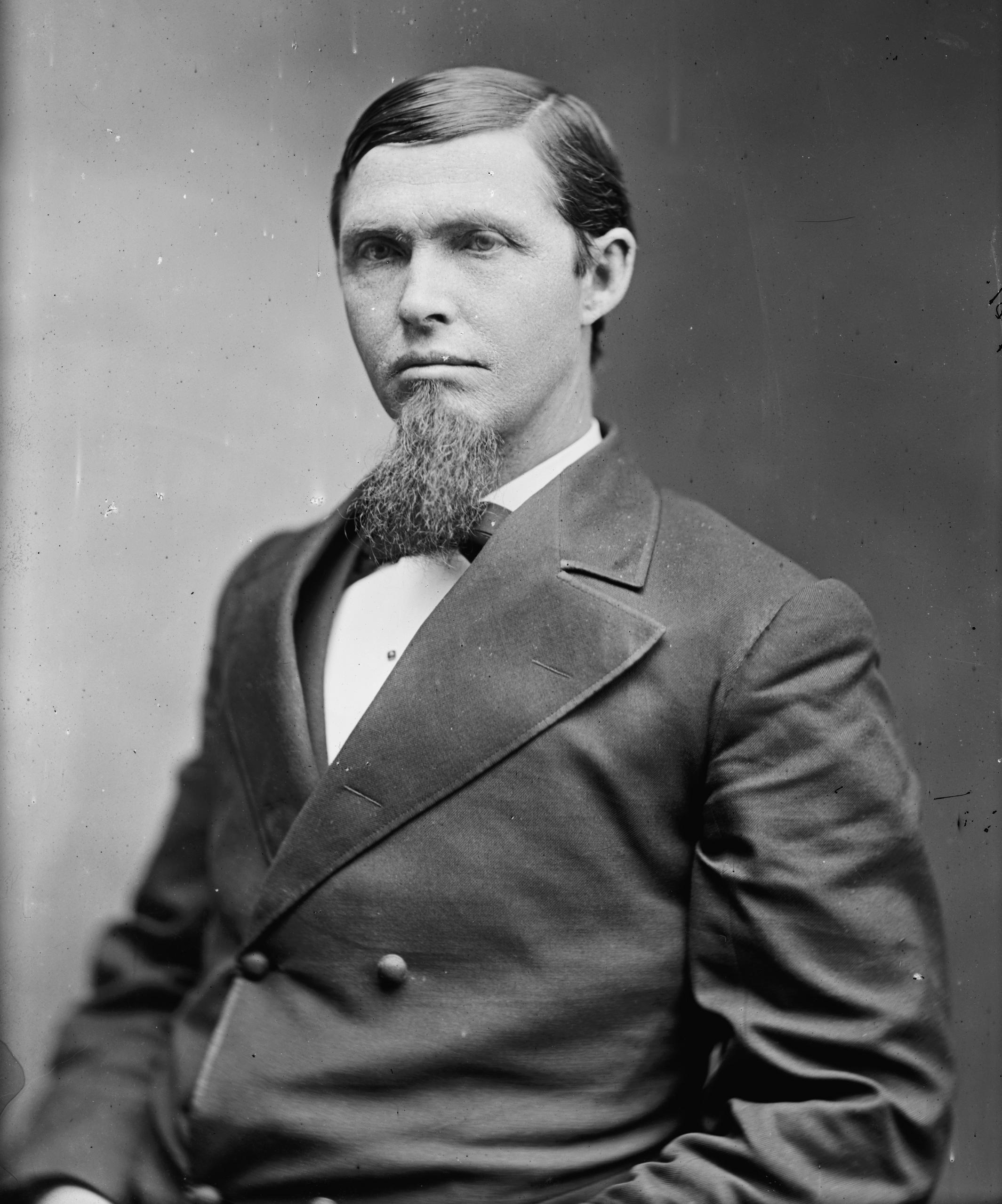
Preston B. Plumb, U.S. Senator, and one-time Marysville resident

Publishing exerted great influence over public opinion in the county in its early days. Monthly and weekly publishings were the earliest known forms of the media in the county originally. The earliest known newspaper in the county was the Our Freedom and Union County Advertiser, first published in Marysville in 1839 by Stephen McClain, Robert McBrattney, and William Lawrence. The newspaper was then renamed the Union Star after a year and continued until May 1841, when it was purchased by John Cassil and renamed the Union Gazette. In 1842, the paper moved to Bellefontaine and was edited by Thomas Robb, with the paper sent weekly to Marysville. In 1843, the paper moved back to Marysville and was published until 1844. During the period it was owned by Cassil, it politically leaned Democratic.

In 1844, the paper was purchased by P.B. Cole and W.C. Lawrence, who renamed it the Argus and Union County Advertiser, and moved the politics toward the Whig party. In 1845, the paper was sold to James Alexander, and after only six weeks, sold back to John Cassil, who turned the paper back into a Democrat political newspaper. In 1846, P.B. Cole bought the newspaper back and turned it back into a Whig political newspaper. In 1849, he sold the paper to C.S. Hamilton, who renamed it the Marysville Tribune. A notable printer of the Marysville Tribune was Preston Plumb, who eventually left Marysville and became a U.S. Senator in Kansas. The paper would eventually be purchased by the Shearer family, who published daily editions that were Republican-leaning, and weekly editions that were independent.

Other papers in the county were the Eaglet, formed in 1845, and lasting only a few months. The Union Journal, formed in 1853, lasted a year. It would be moved to Xenia, where it became the Xenia News, and edited by Whitelaw Reid. The Union Press was formed in 1858 by Hylas Sabine and was Republican-leaning. In 1863, it was purchased by the Vallandighamer family and changed to the Union Democrat, which changed the paper in politics and spent its time attacking the Union government during the American Civil War. It ceased operations in 1864. In 1883, the Darby News was formed in Milford Center and eventually became the Milford Echo before folding. Also, were the Milford Ohioan was formed in 1887, the Richwood Gazette in 1872, the Richwood Reporter in 1882, which ceased operations two years later when destroyed by fire, and the Octograph Review.

In 1874, the Marysville Journal was formed by C.M. Kenton, later becoming the Union County Journal, and leaned Democratic. By 1883, the Marysville Tribune and the Union County Journal were the only newspapers published in the county. Bruce Gaumer purchased the Union County Journal in 1904, and later bought the Marysville Tribune in 1951. In 1952, Gaumer merged the two newspapers into what is known today as the Marysville Journal-Tribune.

==== Banking ====
The pioneers who composed the large majority of county residents in the early 19th century were generally very poor, meaning that there was no need for a bank in the county's early years. Trade was done by barter, including the exchange of coon and deer skins, whiskey, honey, and other durable goods. The state bank issued currency in the early periods known as "red dogs", "wildcats", and other currencies which passed through the county, with a bank note reporter published weekly to inform consumers of exchange rates of these currencies. Gold and silver was of little value in the early days, and what banks were formed usually failed.

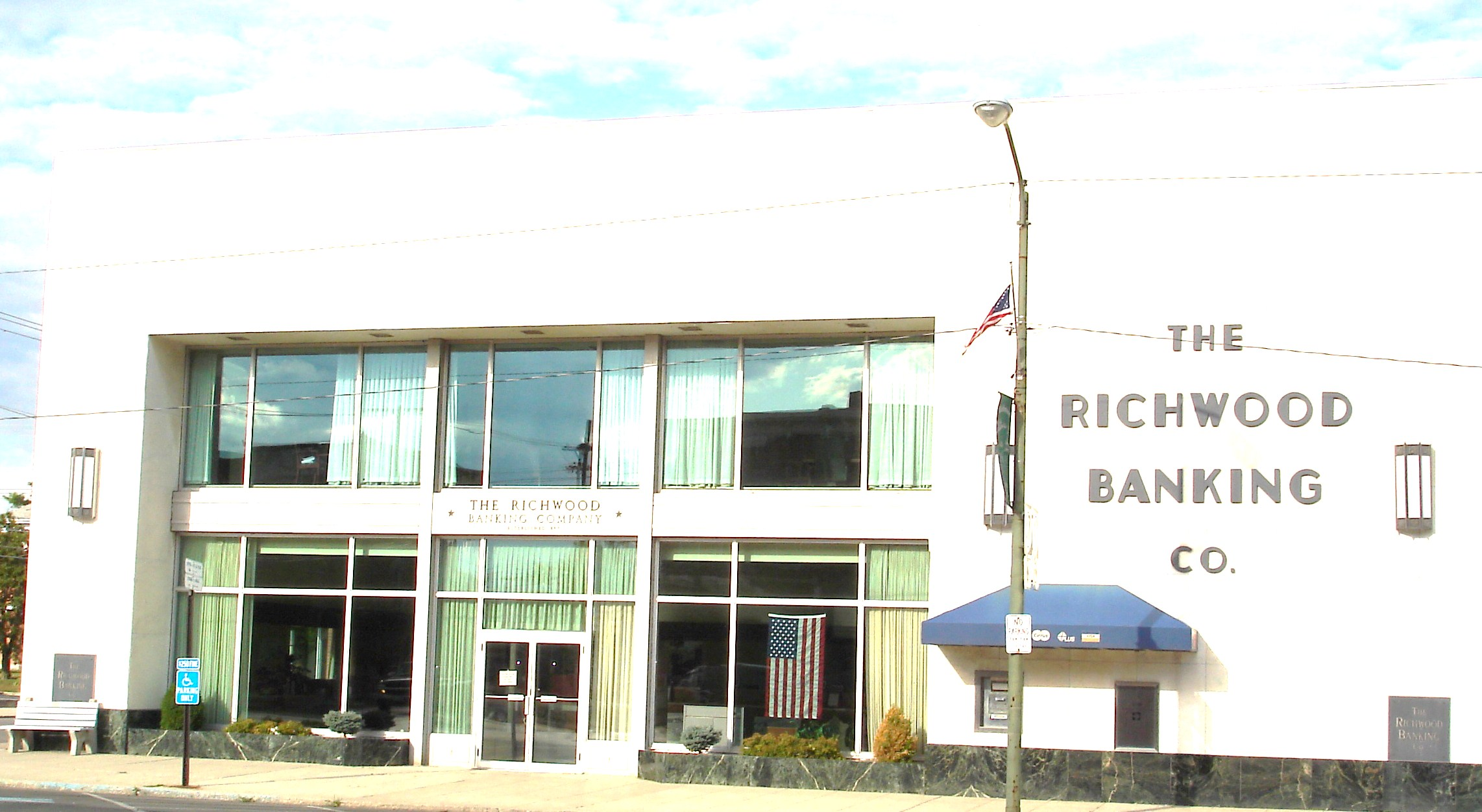
Richwood Banking Company headquarters, Richwood

After some banking laws were passed and the production of the county grew, currency gained value in trade, including paper, gold, and silver, and banks were permanently established in the county. The first bank in the county was the Bank of Marysville, established by Andrews, Evans, and Woods in 1854.

=== Modern development ===
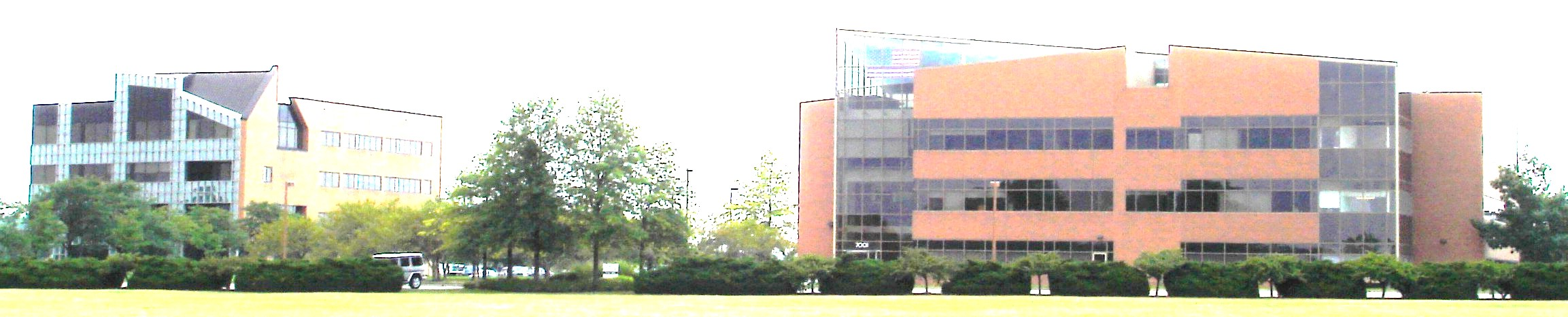
Dublin Entrepreneurial Center, Dublin

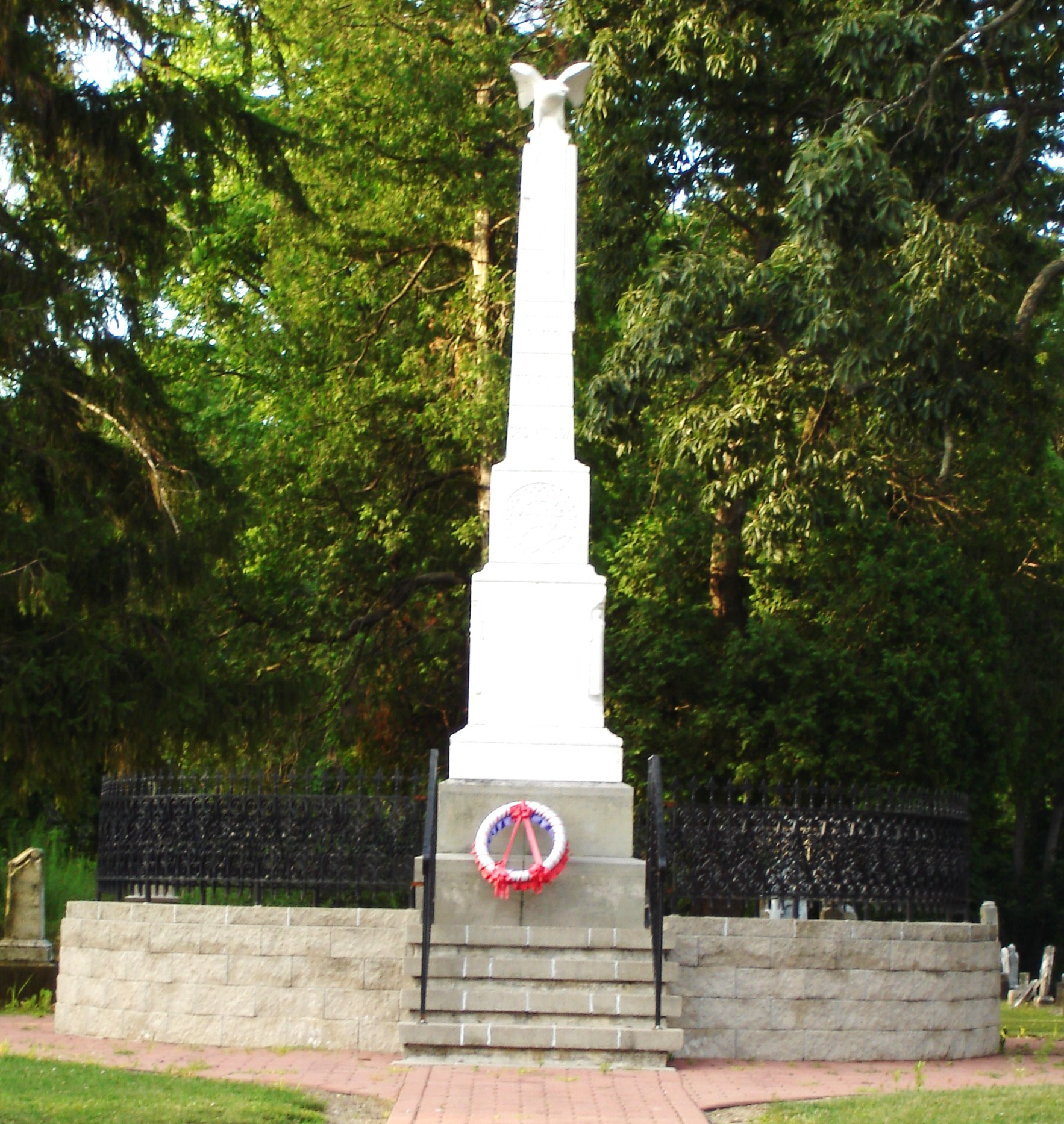
War of the Rebellion memorial, Milford Center

Memorial Hospital of Union County was constructed in Marysville in 1952. Many other developments would take place during this time, including the construction of the Union County Airport in Marysville, as well as numerous manufacturing companies and small housing developments throughout the county. U.S. Route 33 was expanded from a two-lane highway to a four-lane highway in the 1980s.

=== Military heritage ===
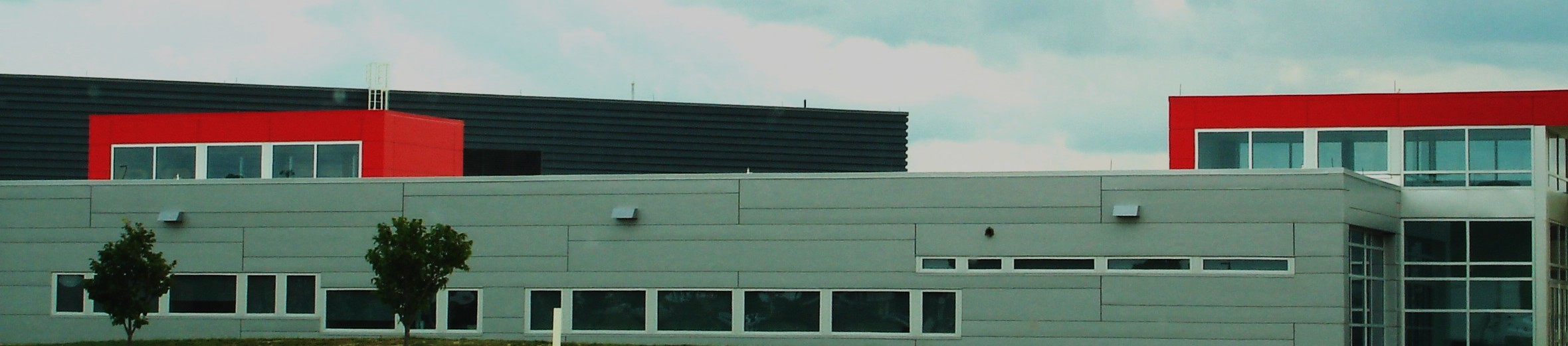
Ohio National Guard training center, Marysville

Union County has a military heritage dating back to the American Revolution, and was a frequent location for the organization of military companies. Because the government paid the soldiers with land grants in the west during the revolution, Union County became home to many of these soldiers after the war. A recorded 14 soldiers from the revolution eventually made their way to Union County, with many others unrecorded because of poor record keeping.

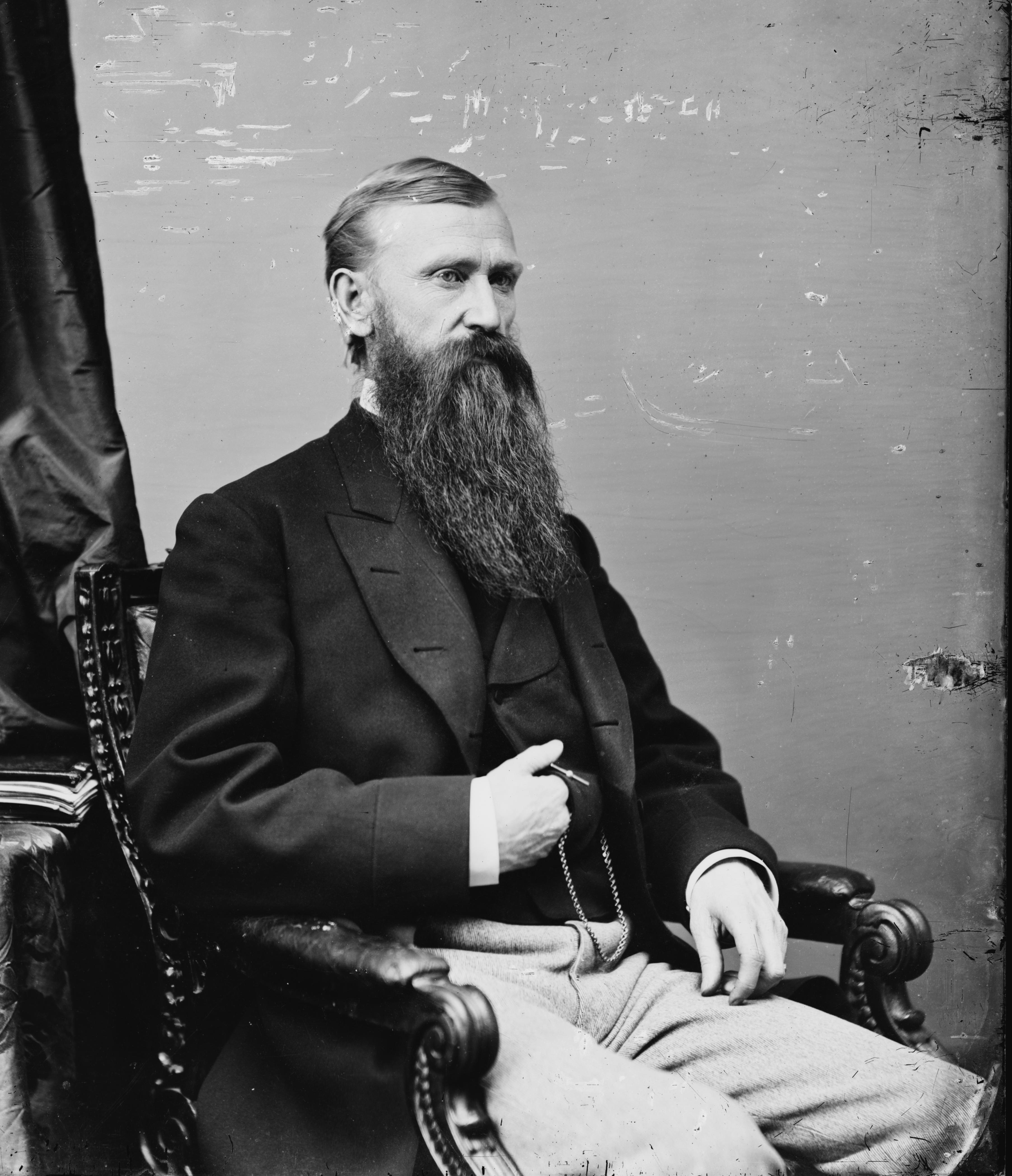
Norton P. Chipman, co-founder of the Grand Army of the Republic, author of order creating Memorial Day, and U.S. Congressman

The War of 1812 broke out with early battles fought in the Northwest Territory, including Lake Erie. A descendant of a hero, Oliver Hazard Perry, from the War of 1812, named Robert S. Beightler, was a native of Union County. A company of 13 Union County men was assembled for this war, with many other natives of Union County joining companies from outside the county, including a company formed by Jonathan Alder. Over 100 natives of the county would serve in the war.

When the Mexican War broke in 1845 following the annexation of Texas into the United States, Union County provided men, totalling over 30.

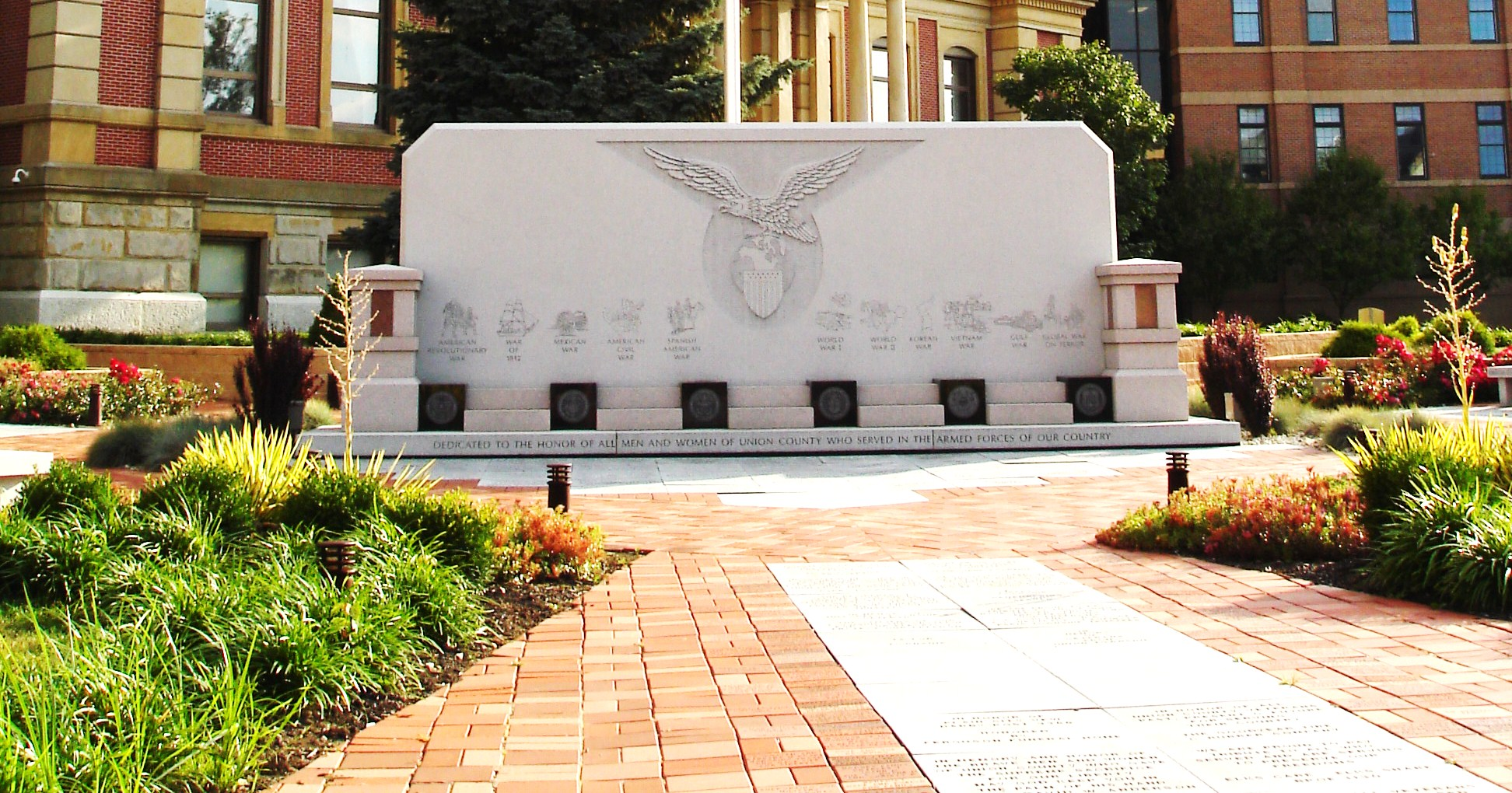
Union County Veterans Memorial, Marysville

The American Civil War followed, which was not greeted in the same manner the previous war was. However, Union County would provide 3,200 men for that war, while producing notable leaders such as Norton P. Chipman.

In 2007, the Union County Veterans Remembrance Committee dedicated the Union County Veterans Memorial on the northeast lawn of the courthouse. This was sponsored through private, public, and corporate grants and donations, including support from the Union County Foundation. In 2008, the Ohio National Guard opened a new $8.2 million Marysville facility.

== Geography ==
According to the U.S. Census Bureau, the county has a total area of 437 square miles (1,130 km^{2}), of which 432 square miles (1,120 km^{2}) is land and 5.1 square miles (13 km^{2}) (1.2%) is water.

=== Adjacent counties ===
- Marion County (northeast)
- Delaware County (east)
- Franklin County (southeast)
- Madison County (south)
- Champaign County (southwest)
- Logan County (west)
- Hardin County (northwest)

== Demographics ==
Historical population
Census	Pop.	Note	%±
1820	1,996		—
1830	3,192		59.9%
1840	8,422		163.8%
1850	12,204		44.9%
1860	16,507		35.3%
1870	18,730		13.5%
1880	22,375		19.5%
1890	22,860		2.2%
1900	22,342		−2.3%
1910	21,871		−2.1%
1920	20,918		−4.4%
1930	19,192		−8.3%
1940	20,012		4.3%
1950	20,687		3.4%
1960	22,853		10.5%
1970	23,786		4.1%
1980	29,536		24.2%
1990	31,969		8.2%
2000	40,909		28.0%
2010	52,300		27.8%
2020	62,784		20.0%
2025 (est.)	73,446	▲	17.0%
U.S. Decennial Census; 1790-1960 1900-1990; 1990-2000 2020

=== 2020 census ===
As of the 2020 census, the county had a population of 62,784. The median age was 38.0 years, with 25.8% of residents under the age of 18 and 12.9% of residents who were 65 years of age or older. For every 100 females there were 91.4 males, and for every 100 females age 18 and over there were 87.6 males.

The racial makeup of the county was 85.5% White, 2.1% Black or African American, 0.2% American Indian and Alaska Native, 6.4% Asian, <0.1% Native Hawaiian and Pacific Islander, 0.8% from some other race, and 5.0% from two or more races. Hispanic or Latino residents of any race comprised 2.4% of the population.

55.0% of residents lived in urban areas, while 45.0% lived in rural areas.

There were 21,807 households in the county, of which 39.0% had children under the age of 18 living in them. Of all households, 62.7% were married-couple households, 13.6% were households with a male householder and no spouse or partner present, and 17.8% were households with a female householder and no spouse or partner present. About 19.1% of all households were made up of individuals and 7.8% had someone living alone who was 65 years of age or older.

There were 23,141 housing units, of which 5.8% were vacant. Among occupied housing units, 78.9% were owner-occupied and 21.1% were renter-occupied. The homeowner vacancy rate was 1.2% and the rental vacancy rate was 8.0%.

=== Racial and ethnic composition ===
Union County, Ohio – Racial and ethnic composition Note: the US Census treats Hispanic/Latino as an ethnic category. This table excludes Latinos from the racial categories and assigns them to a separate category. Hispanics/Latinos may be of any race.
Race / Ethnicity (NH = Non-Hispanic)	Pop 1980	Pop 1990	Pop 2000	Pop 2010	Pop 2020	% 1980	% 1990	% 2000	% 2010	% 2020
White alone (NH)	28,713	30,471	38,795	48,169	53,287	97.21%	95.31%	94.83%	92.10%	84.87%
Black or African American alone (NH)	556	1,149	1,139	1,202	1,275	1.88%	3.59%	2.78%	2.30%	2.03%
Native American or Alaska Native alone (NH)	41	52	69	110	93	0.14%	0.16%	0.17%	0.21%	0.15%
Asian alone (NH)	78	126	220	1,419	4,043	0.26%	0.39%	0.54%	2.71%	6.44%
Native Hawaiian or Pacific Islander alone (NH)	x	x	6	16	0	x	x	0.01%	0.03%	0.00%
Other race alone (NH)	21	12	25	45	201	0.07%	0.04%	0.06%	0.09%	0.32%
Mixed race or Multiracial (NH)	x	x	346	678	2,351	x	x	0.85%	1.30%	3.74%
Hispanic or Latino (any race)	127	159	309	661	1,534	0.43%	0.50%	0.76%	1.26%	2.44%
Total	29,536	31,969	40,909	52,300	62,784	100.00%	100.00%	100.00%	100.00%	100.00%

=== 2010 census ===
As of the 2010 United States census, there were 52,300 people, 18,065 households, and 13,681 families residing in the county. The population density was 121.1 inhabitants per square mile (46.8/km^{2}). There were 19,429 housing units at an average density of 45.0 per square mile (17.4/km^{2}). The racial makeup of the county was 92.9% white, 2.7% Asian, 2.4% black or African American, 0.2% American Indian, 0.3% from other races, and 1.4% from two or more races. Those of Hispanic or Latino origin made up 1.3% of the population. In terms of ancestry, 34.1% were German, 15.3% were Irish, 13.6% were English, and 13.6% were American.

Of the 18,065 households, 40.8% had children under the age of 18 living with them, 62.8% were married couples living together, 8.7% had a female householder with no husband present, 24.3% were non-families, and 19.5% of all households were made up of individuals. The average household size was 2.73 and the average family size was 3.14. The median age was 36.4 years.

The median income for a household in the county was $68,452 and the median income for a family was $78,254. Males had a median income of $55,187 versus $38,094 for females. The per capita income for the county was $27,389. About 5.1% of families and 6.4% of the population were below the poverty line, including 7.9% of those under age 18 and 6.2% of those age 65 or over.

=== 2000 census ===
As of the census of 2000, there were 40,909 people, 14,346 households, and 10,888 families residing in the county. The population density was 94 inhabitants per square mile (36/km^{2}). There were 15,217 housing units at an average density of 35 units per square mile (14/km^{2}). The racial makeup of the county was 95.25% White, 2.81% Black or African American, 0.18% Native American, 0.54% Asian, 0.02% Pacific Islander, 0.22% from other races, and 0.98% from two or more races. 0.76% of the population were Hispanic or Latino of any race.

There were 14,346 households, out of which 38.50% had children under the age of 18 living with them, 64.40% were married couples living together, 8.00% had a female householder with no husband present, and 24.10% were non-families. 19.90% of all households were made up of individuals, and 7.30% had someone living alone who was 65 years of age or older. The average household size was 2.70 and the average family size was 3.11.

In the county, the population was spread out, with 27.60% under the age of 18, 7.50% from 18 to 24, 34.00% from 25 to 44, 21.20% from 45 to 64, and 9.60% who were 65 years of age or older. The median age was 34 years. For every 100 females there were 91.50 males. For every 100 females age 18 and over, there were 85.80 males.

The median income for a household in the county was $51,743, and the median income for a family was $58,384. Males had a median income of $40,910 versus $27,405 for females. The per capita income for the county was $20,577. About 3.60% of families and 4.60% of the population were below the poverty line, including 4.30% of those under age 18 and 7.80% of those age 65 or over.

== Economy ==
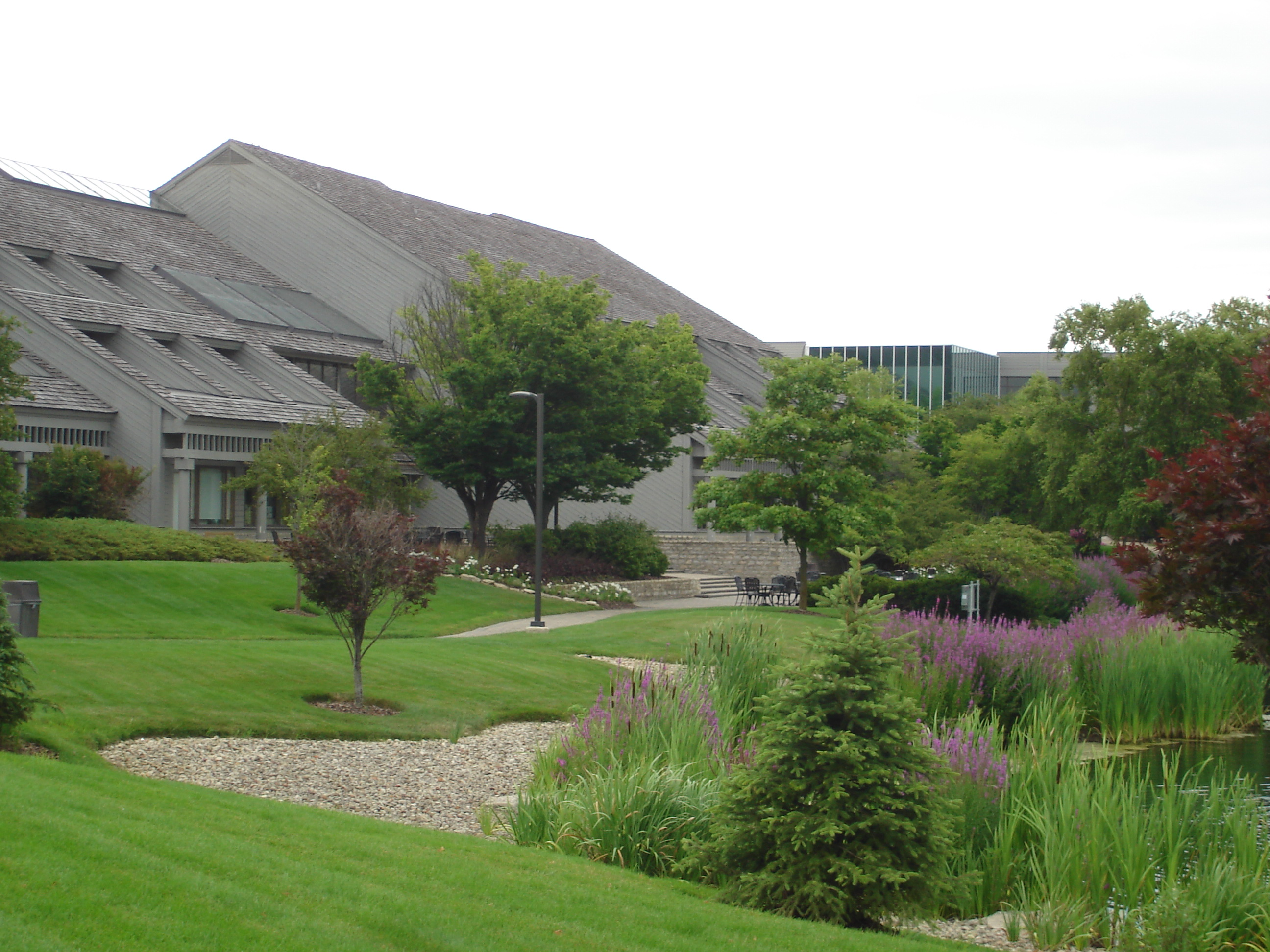
Scotts Miracle-Gro global headquarters, Marysville

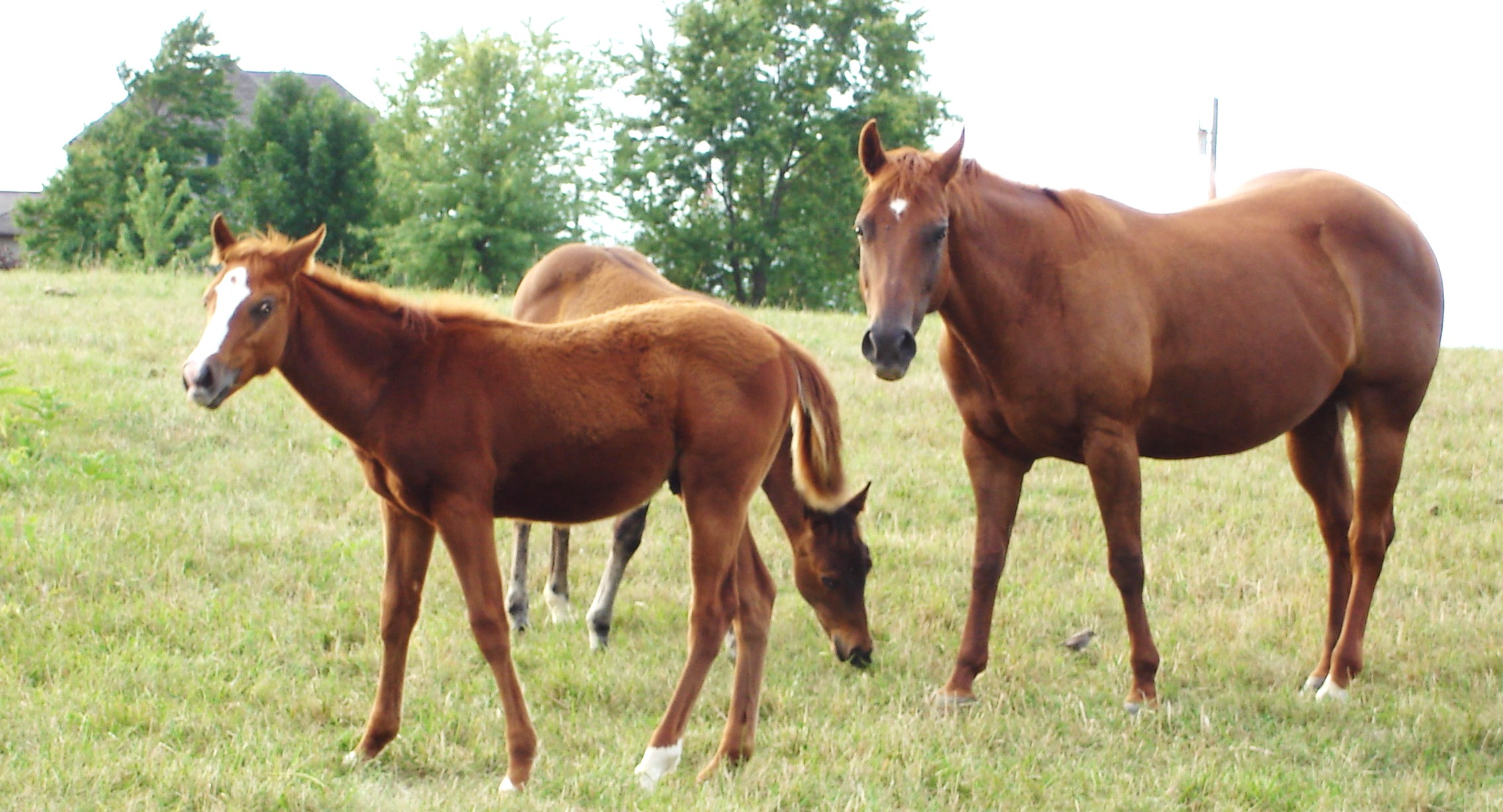
Family of horses grazing on farm in southern Union County

The largest industry sectors in Union County are agriculture, industrial and manufacturing, and research and development. The county sales tax is 7.00%, and the county typically has unemployment rates below the state and national averages.

=== Agriculture ===
Agriculture makes up a large portion of the county's economy. Of the county's total acreage of 277,760 acres (1,124.1 km^{2}), 230,720 are dedicated to agriculture. In total, there were 1000 farms with annual revenue totaling $85 million in 2006. Western Union County sits on the edge of the northwest Ohio "wind belt" and has attracted interest from energy companies specializing in wind farms. Ohio produces in excess of five million bushels (130,000 metric tons (130,000 long tons; 140,000 short tons)) of corn per year and contributes tremendously to regional ethanol production.

There are numerous local family farms in Union County, as well as multinational agricultural services corporations like Scotts Miracle-Gro Company and Select Sires. A notable local area farmer is Jack Foust. His cattle at the Mayflower Farm have produced world records, while he himself has publicly served in positions appointed by the United States Secretary of Agriculture Bob Bergland and Ohio Governor Richard Celeste. He has been chairman of the Union County Board of Elections, and is an inductee into the Ohio Agricultural Hall of Fame.

There is a Union County Farmer's Market, and the Ohio State University operates an agricultural extension office in the central portion of the county.

=== Industrial ===
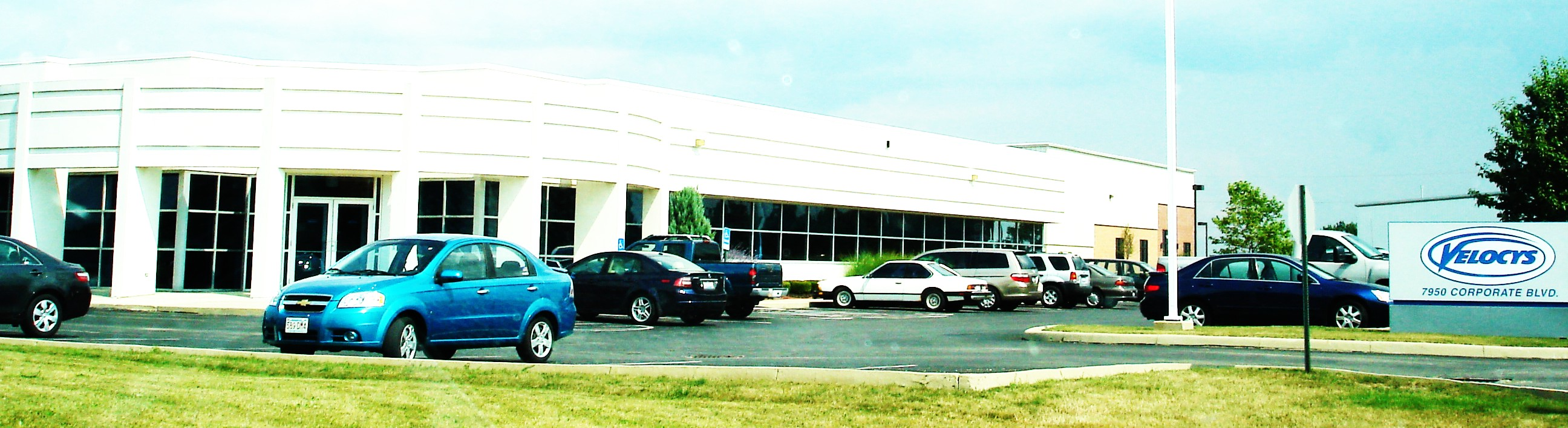
Velocys Biotech, Jerome Township

In 2007, the estimated value of manufacturing operations in the county was well over $3.5 billion.

It is the home to major corporations, including Scotts Miracle-Gro and Univenture. Major corporations operating regional facilities in the county include Honda of America, Goodyear/Veyance Technologies, Parker Hannifin, United Rotary Brush, and Invensys Climate Control. The Honda operation includes the Marysville Auto Plant. Other large companies located in the county include Sumitomo Electric Wiring Systems, Ray Lewis and Son, Velocys, MAI Manufacturing, NEX Transport, and Midwest Express, among others.

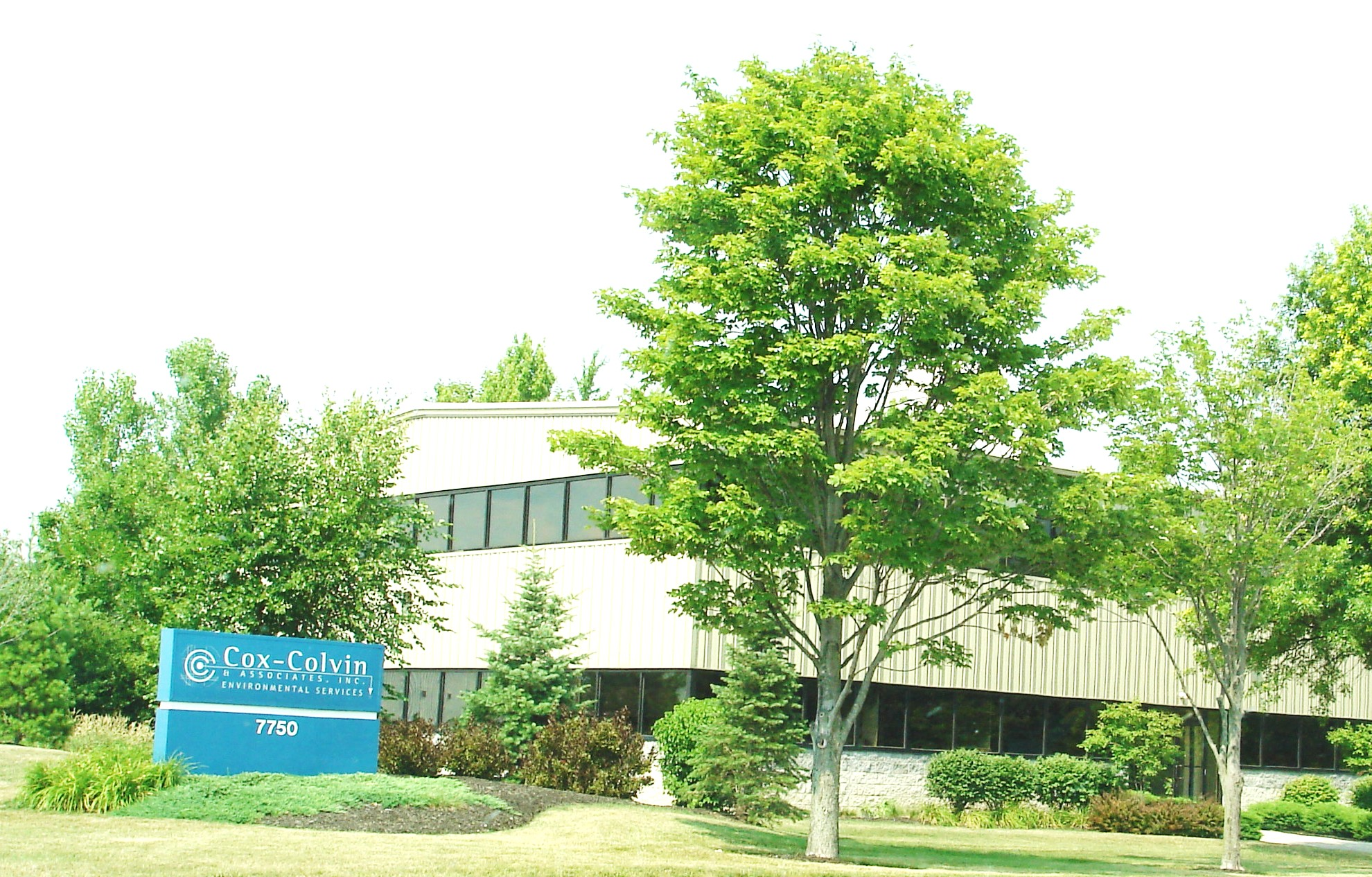
Cox-Colvin & Associates, Environmental Services, Jerome Township

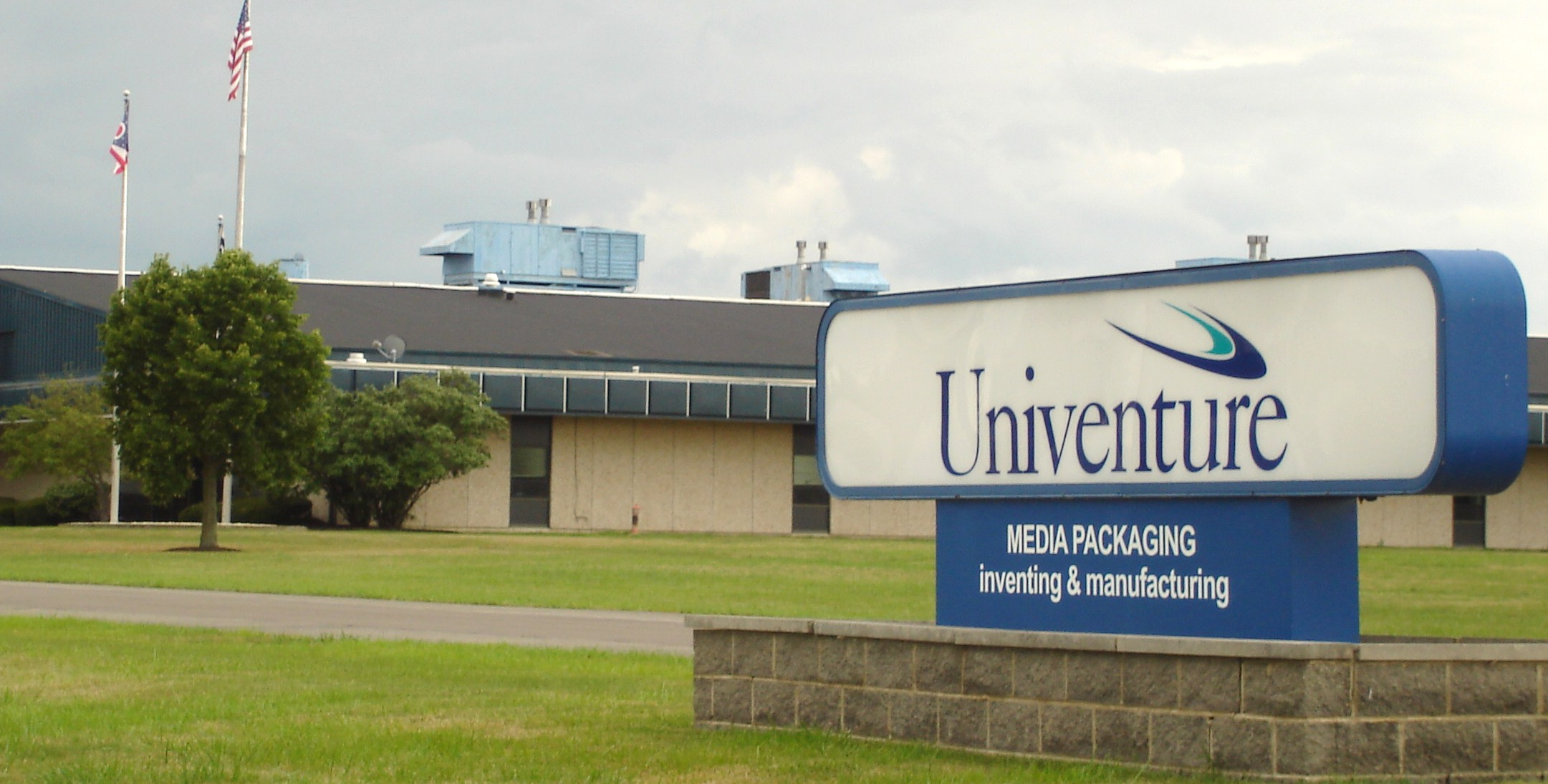
Univenture global headquarters, Marysville

Between 2000 and 2007, Union County businesses were awarded $9.3 million in United States Department of Defense contracts. The companies receiving those contracts were the Electronic Services Agency, Parker Hannifin, United Rotary Brush, and Leo Berbee Bulb Company.

=== Research and development ===
Union County is home to major research and development operations. Nestlé is located in Marysville, and in recent years improved their facilities with a modern, multimillion-dollar makeover. Scotts Miracle-Gro also has their R&D operations located on their corporate campus. The Transportation Research Center is located on the western county line. A unit of Univenture, Algae Venture Systems, recently made a breakthrough by developing a process to produce algae as a cost-effective biofuel.

== Government ==
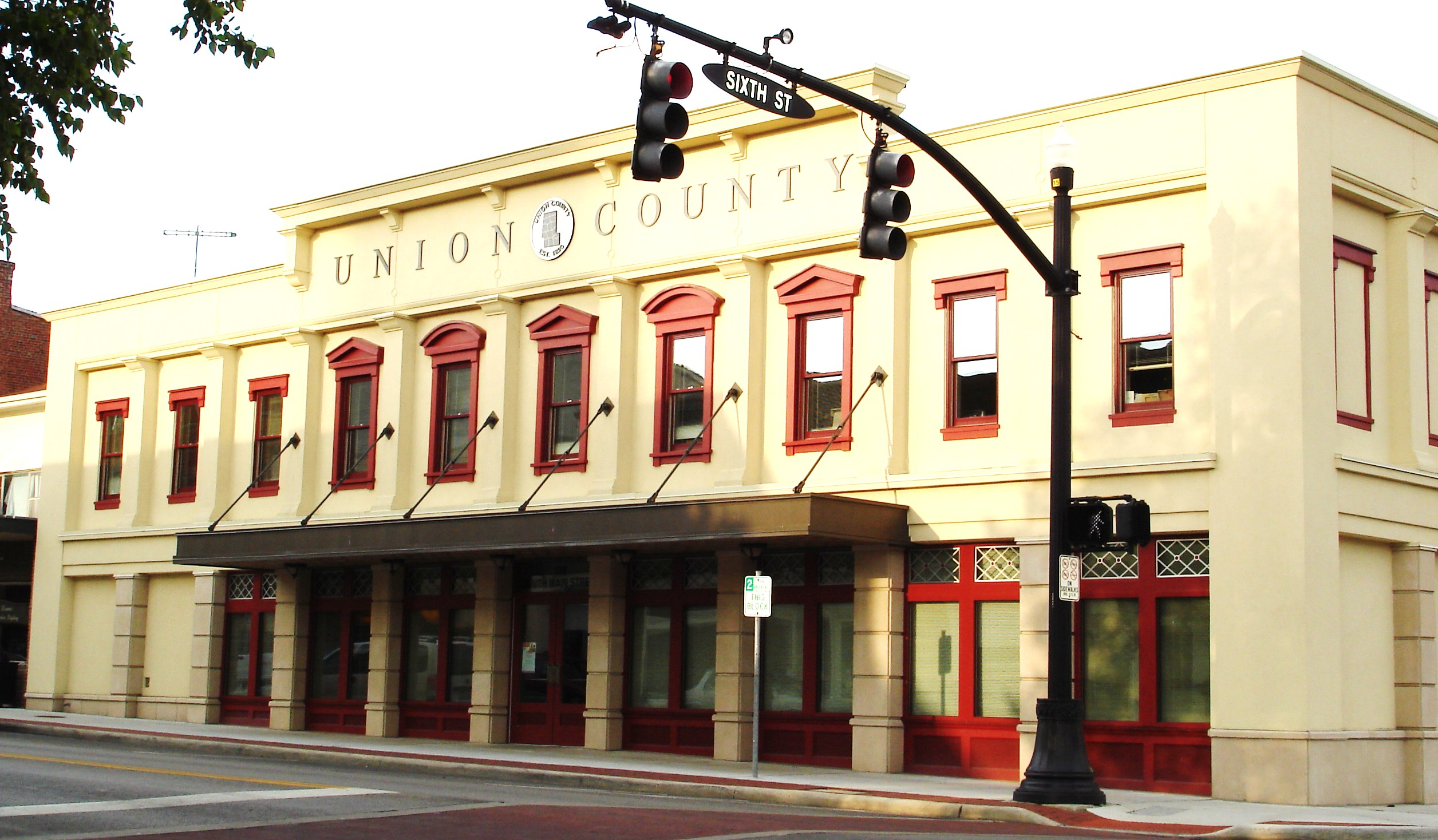
Union County offices, Uptown Marysville

The county receives its power through Ohio statute. It has three elected commissioners that serve four years, as well as an elected treasurer, auditor, recorder, coroner, clerk of courts, engineer, prosecuting attorney, sheriff, and judges. In 2007, the county had $112 million in assets, and revenues of $50 million.

The county is a part of the 4th U.S. congressional district in Ohio, the 86th Ohio legislative district in Ohio, and the 26th Ohio senate district.

== Politics ==
Union County is a Republican Party stronghold. Its strong Republican roots go back to the formation of the party in the 1800s following the collapse of the Whig Party, which had previously been the preferred party.

The county has supported the Republican Party in all but two presidential elections since the Civil War, with the only Democrats to win the county being Woodrow Wilson in 1912 when the Republican Party was divided, and Franklin Roosevelt in 1932. In the last twenty-one presidential elections, the Democratic candidate has only once — in Lyndon B. Johnson’s 1964 landslide when he won all but five counties in Ohio — received more than 37 percent of the county's vote.

As part of Ohio's 5th congressional district and Ohio's 15th congressional district it had been represented by Republicans for almost seventy years until the 2008 election, when Democrat Mary Jo Kilroy, won a close, disputed contest against Steve Stivers. In 2010, Stivers defeated her in a rematch, and after reapportionment and redistricting, the county was placed in the heavily Republican 4th district, currently represented by Jim Jordan.

The entire county is contained in the 26th Ohio Senate district and is currently represented by Bill Reineke, who previously served as the state Representative for the 88th Ohio House district. He was elected as President Pro Tempore of the Ohio Senate for the 136th Ohio General Assembly.

The entire county is contained in the 86th Ohio House district, currently represented by Tracy Richardson who was elected in 2018.

United States presidential election results for Union County, Ohio
Year	Republican		Democratic		Third party(ies)	
Year	No.	%	No.	%	No.	%
1856	1,431	52.06%	1,055	38.38%	263	9.57%
1860	1,792	55.55%	1,145	35.49%	289	8.96%
1864	2,233	63.87%	1,263	36.13%	0	0.00%
1868	2,361	61.89%	1,454	38.11%	0	0.00%
1872	2,450	60.91%	1,564	38.89%	8	0.20%
1876	2,939	58.36%	2,073	41.16%	24	0.48%
1880	3,302	59.12%	2,236	40.04%	47	0.84%
1884	3,515	59.51%	2,242	37.95%	150	2.54%
1888	3,468	58.53%	2,224	37.54%	233	3.93%
1892	3,001	54.26%	2,055	37.15%	475	8.59%
1896	3,476	55.36%	2,736	43.57%	67	1.07%
1900	3,561	57.89%	2,484	40.38%	106	1.72%
1904	3,646	63.71%	1,924	33.62%	153	2.67%
1908	3,567	57.04%	2,568	41.07%	118	1.89%
1912	2,051	35.32%	2,362	40.68%	1,394	24.01%
1916	3,182	52.97%	2,747	45.73%	78	1.30%
1920	6,544	66.34%	3,286	33.31%	35	0.35%
1924	5,256	62.74%	2,571	30.69%	551	6.58%
1928	5,876	70.53%	2,386	28.64%	69	0.83%
1932	4,912	49.27%	4,943	49.58%	114	1.14%
1936	5,673	51.81%	5,157	47.10%	120	1.10%
1940	7,214	64.64%	3,947	35.36%	0	0.00%
1944	6,908	70.38%	2,907	29.62%	0	0.00%
1948	5,688	65.28%	3,008	34.52%	17	0.20%
1952	7,761	73.19%	2,843	26.81%	0	0.00%
1956	7,575	74.06%	2,653	25.94%	0	0.00%
1960	7,838	71.55%	3,116	28.45%	0	0.00%
1964	5,504	52.47%	4,985	47.53%	0	0.00%
1968	6,415	62.66%	2,431	23.74%	1,392	13.60%
1972	8,389	75.89%	2,447	22.14%	218	1.97%
1976	7,464	61.98%	4,377	36.34%	202	1.68%
1980	7,576	67.73%	3,038	27.16%	572	5.11%
1984	9,336	77.79%	2,579	21.49%	86	0.72%
1988	8,846	73.28%	3,130	25.93%	95	0.79%
1992	7,818	52.91%	3,465	23.45%	3,494	23.64%
1996	8,290	55.26%	4,989	33.25%	1,724	11.49%
2000	11,502	67.56%	5,040	29.61%	482	2.83%
2004	15,870	70.13%	6,665	29.45%	96	0.42%
2008	15,744	63.02%	8,761	35.07%	479	1.92%
2012	16,289	63.57%	8,805	34.36%	529	2.06%
2016	18,096	65.34%	7,718	27.87%	1,881	6.79%
2020	21,669	64.62%	11,141	33.22%	725	2.16%
2024	23,982	63.84%	12,934	34.43%	651	1.73%

United States Senate election results for Union County, Ohio1
Year	Republican		Democratic		Third party(ies)	
Year	No.	%	No.	%	No.	%
2024	21,926	59.32%	13,719	37.12%	1,315	3.56%

== Transportation ==
=== Airports ===
The Union County Airport is located one nautical mile (1.2 mi; 1.9 km) southeast of Marysville's central business district.

=== Major highways ===
- US 33
- US 36
- US 42
- SR 4
- SR 31
- SR 37
- SR 38
- SR 47
- SR 161
- SR 245
- SR 347
- SR 736
- SR 739

== Communities ==
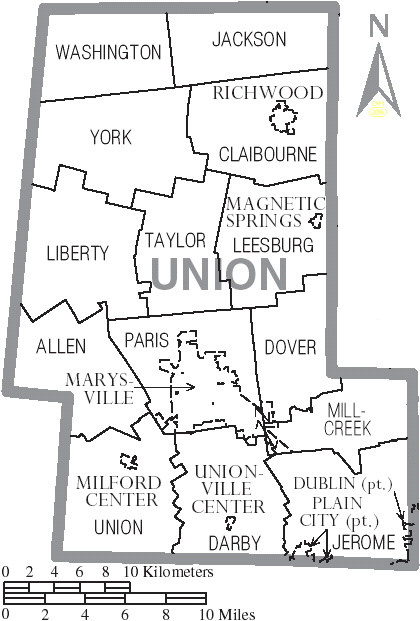
Map of Union County with municipal and township labels

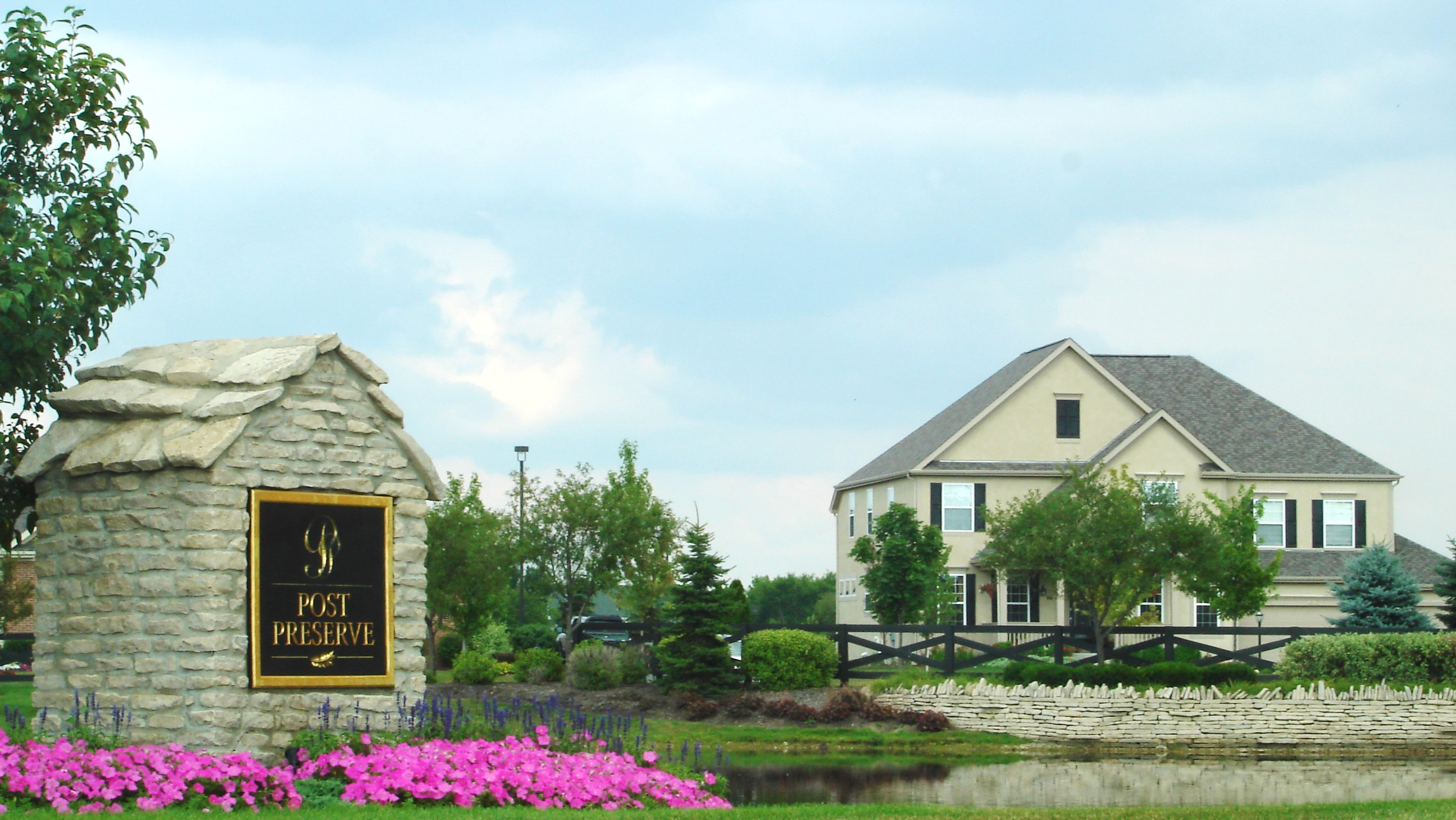
Post Preserve, Dublin

=== Cities ===
- Dublin (part)
- Marysville (county seat)

=== Villages ===
- Magnetic Springs
- Milford Center
- Plain City (part)
- Richwood
- Unionville Center

=== Townships ===
- Allen
- Claibourne
- Darby
- Dover
- Jackson
- Jerome
- Leesburg
- Liberty
- Millcreek
- Paris
- Taylor
- Union
- Washington
- York

=== Census-designated places ===
- New California
- Raymond

=== Unincorporated communities ===
- Adena Pointe
- Allen Center
- Arbela
- Arnold
- Bridgeport
- Broadway
- Byhalia
- Chuckery
- Claibourne
- Dipple
- Essex
- Fleetwood Park
- Homer
- Irwin
- Jerome
- Lunda
- New Dover
- Otter
- Peoria
- Pharisburg
- Pottersburg
- Somersville
- Watkins
- West Jackson
- Woodland
- Woodview Park
- York Center

== Education ==
School districts include:

City school districts:

- Dublin City School District

Local school districts:

- Jonathan Alder Local School District
- Buckeye Valley Local School District
- Elgin Local School District
- Fairbanks Local School District
- Benjamin Logan Local School District
- Marysville Exempted Village School District
- North Union Local School District
- Triad Local School District

== Notable people ==
- Robert S. Beightler - military general and contributor to the modern Interstate Highway System and Ohio Turnpike
- Chase Blackburn - world champion professional American football athlete
- Norton P. Chipman - American Civil War army officer, co-founder of the Grand Army of the Republic, author of the order creating Memorial Day
- Arthur E. Drumm - industrialist, inventor, and industrial broom pioneer
- Charles W. Fairbanks - 26th vice-president of the United States
- Hiram Gabriel - Wisconsin state legislator
- Darren Hall - professional American baseball athlete
- Cornelius S. Hamilton - United States Congressman
- John F. Kinney - American jurist and politician
- Reuben Partridge - pioneer engineer, "The Bridge Builder"
- Dorothy Pelanda - first woman to serve as Director of the Ohio Department of Agriculture
- Preston B. Plumb - United States Senator
- Martha Root - teacher of the Baháʼí Faith in the late 19th and early 20th century
- James E. Robinson - Ohio Supreme Court Justice
- James Wallace Robinson - United States Congressman
- Orlando Scott - founder of the O.M. Scott and Sons Company, later becoming the Scotts Miracle-Gro Company
- Kathryn Sellers - first federally appointed female judge in the United States
- Edward Stillings - American jurist, politician, businessman
- Thomas B. Ward - United States Congressman
- Beriah Wilkins - United States Congressman

== Covered bridges of Union County ==
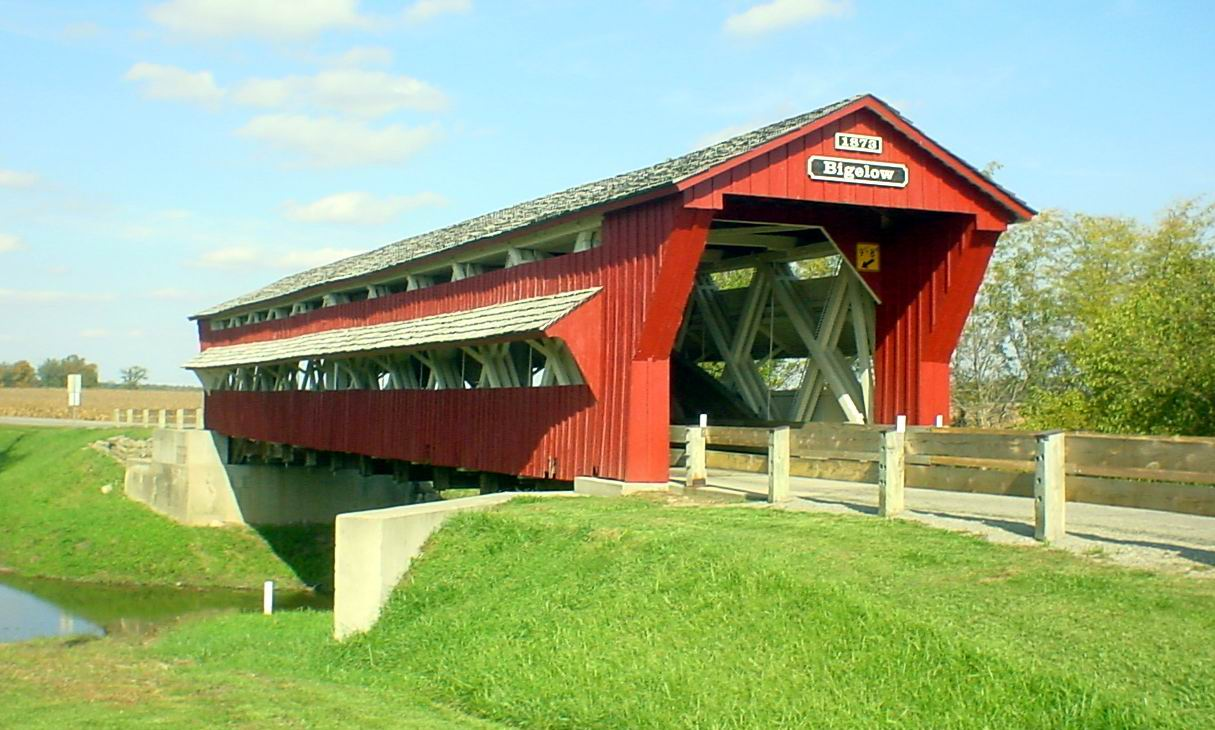
Bigelow Bridge

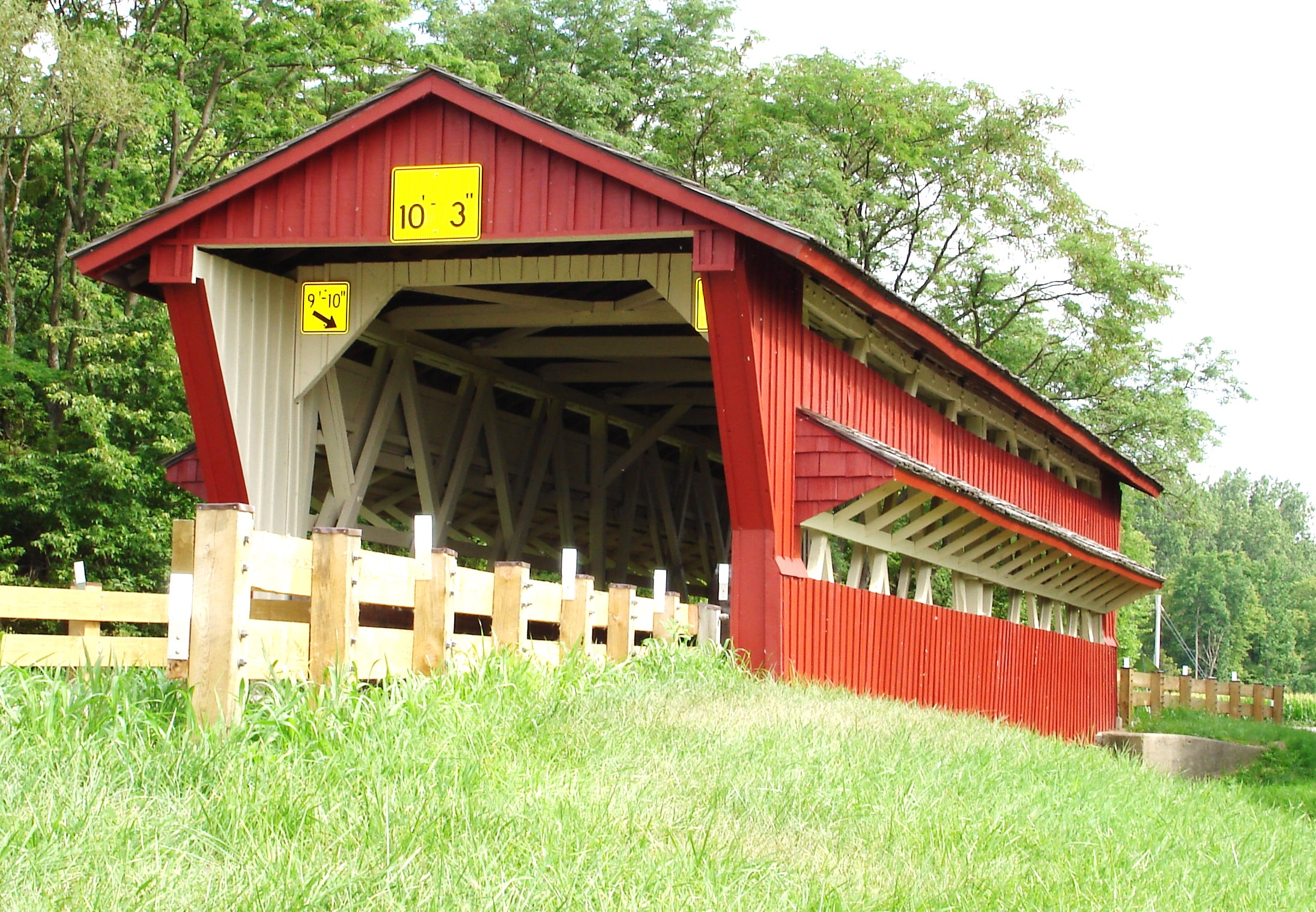
Spain Creek covered bridge

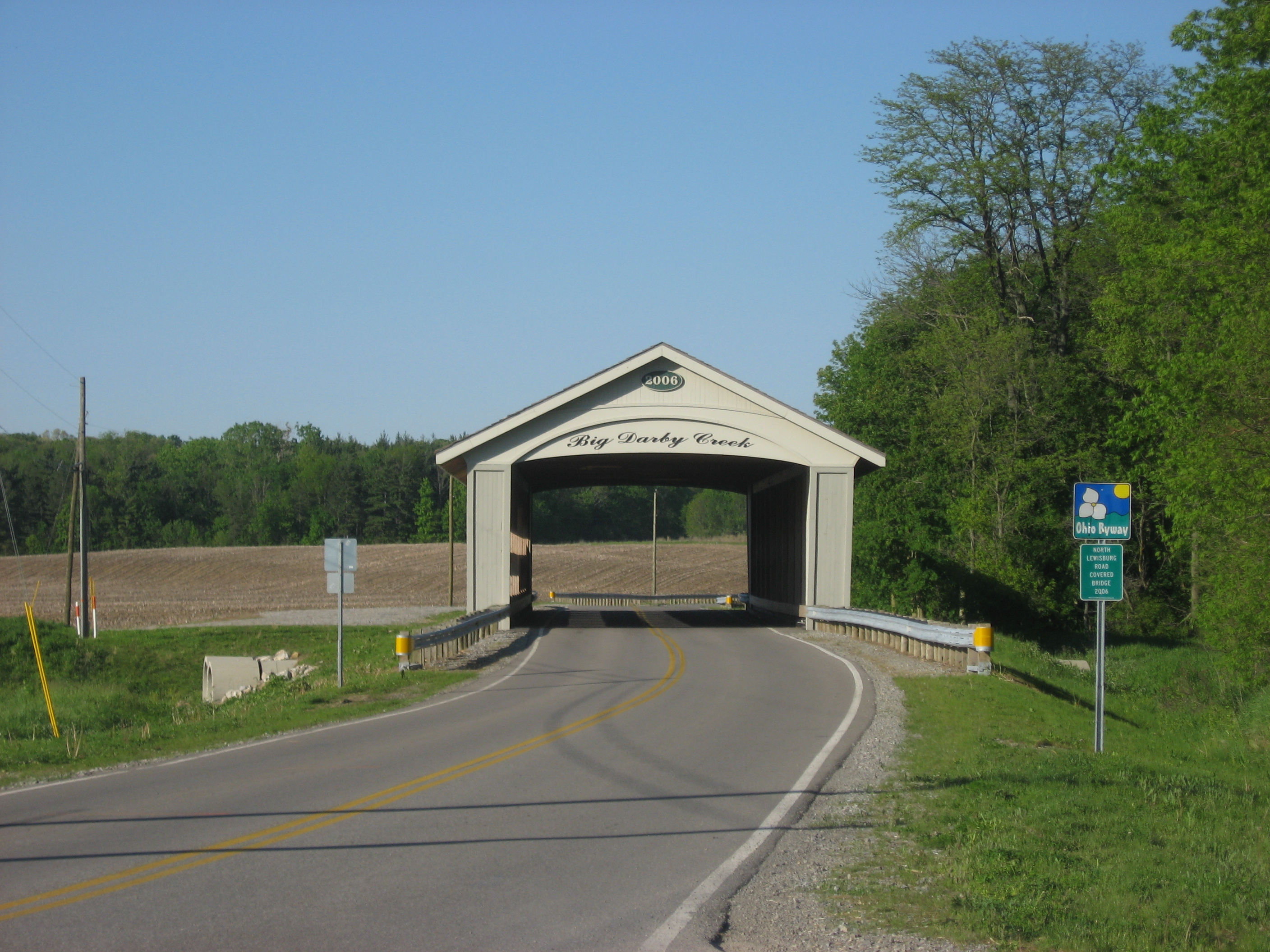
North Lewisburg Road covered bridge

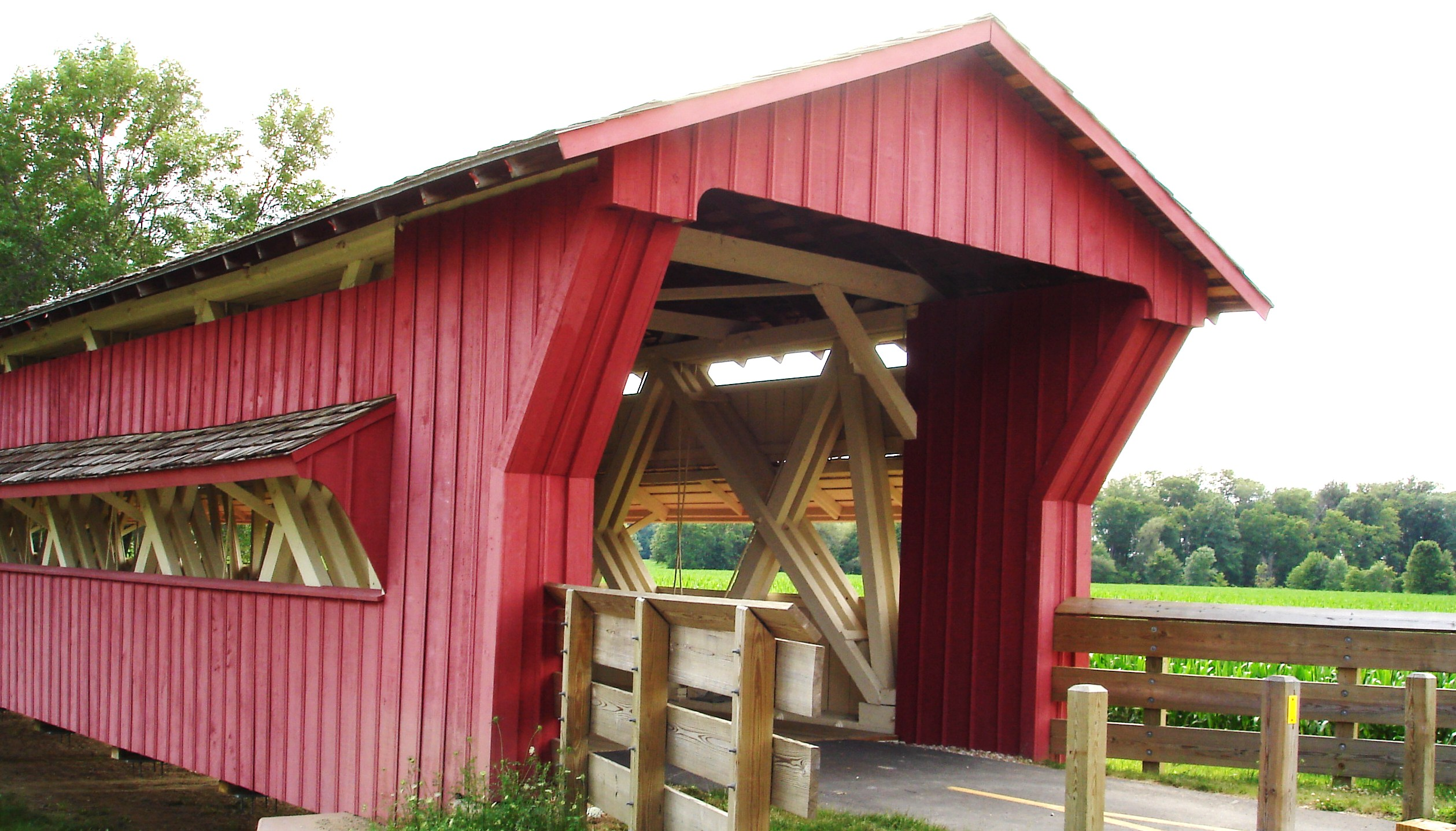
Pottersburg covered bridge

== See also ==
- National Register of Historic Places listings in Union County, Ohio
