= Watkins, Ohio =

- Unincorporated community
- Location within Ohio
- Coordinates: 40°12′45″N 83°14′49″W
- Country: United States
- State: Ohio
- Counties: Union
- Elevation: 961 ft (293 m)
- Time zone: UTC-5 (Eastern (EST))
  - Summer (DST): UTC-4 (EDT)
- ZIP code: 43040
- Area codes: 937, 326
- GNIS feature ID: 1065456

Watkins is an unincorporated community in Mill Creek Township, Union County, Ohio, United States. It is located along Watkins Road, between U.S. Route 33 and U.S. Route 42, about five miles east of Marysville.

== History ==
Watkins was laid out and platted in 1838, and named for Joseph S. Watkins, a government surveyor. The Watkins Post office was established on March 18, 1840, but was discontinued on July 31, 1908. The mail service is now sent through the Marysville branch.
