= Pharisburg, Ohio =

- Unincorporated community
- Location within Ohio
- Coordinates: 40°20′43″N 83°18′13″W
- Country: United States
- State: Ohio
- Counties: Union
- Elevation: 955 ft (291 m)
- Time zone: UTC-5 (Eastern (EST))
  - Summer (DST): UTC-4 (EDT)
- ZIP code: 43040
- Area codes: 937, 326
- GNIS feature ID: 1061536

Pharisburg (originally known as Scotts Corners) is an unincorporated community in Leesburg Township, Union County, Ohio, United States. It is located at the intersection of Ohio State Routes 4 and 347, about two miles west of Magnetic Springs.

Pharisburg was platted in 1848 by Allen Pharis. The community was originally called Scotts Corners, but changed its name for the Pharis family. The Pharisburg Post office was established as the Pharisburgh Post Office on April 25, 1840, but was discontinued on October 24, 1845. It was reestablished on September 7, 1848, and the name was changed to Pharisburg Post Office on March 26, 1892. The Post Office was finally discontinued on April 15, 1908. The mail service is now sent through the Marysville branch.
