= Otter, Ohio =

- Unincorporated community
- Location within Ohio
- Coordinates: 40°16′33″N 83°25′09″W
- Country: United States
- State: Ohio
- Counties: Union
- Elevation: 1,014 ft (309 m)
- Time zone: UTC-5 (Eastern (EST))
  - Summer (DST): UTC-4 (EDT)
- ZIP code: 43040
- Area codes: 937, 326
- GNIS feature ID: 1049046

Otter is an unincorporated community in Paris Township, Union County, Ohio, United States. It is located at 40°16′33″N 83°25′09″W, just northwest of Marysville, on the banks of Otter Run, at the intersection of Dog Leg Road and Westlake-Lee Road.

Before 1900, there was a railroad station located here on the Western Division of the Toledo and Ohio Central Railway, but never a post office. The railroad station was discontinued on May 26, 1954.
