= Woodview Park, Ohio =

- Unincorporated community
- Location within Ohio
- Coordinates: 40°15′44″N 83°21′26″W
- Country: United States
- State: Ohio
- Counties: Union
- Elevation: 984 ft (300 m)
- Time zone: UTC-5 (Eastern (EST))
  - Summer (DST): UTC-4 (EDT)
- ZIP code: 43040
- Area codes: 937, 326
- GNIS feature ID: 1048124

Woodview Park is an unincorporated community in Paris Township, Union County, Ohio, United States. It is located at the intersection of Ohio State Route 4 and Country Home Road, just north of Marysville.
