= Woodland, Ohio =

- Unincorporated community
- Location within Ohio
- Coordinates: 40°28′44″N 83°15′27″W
- Country: United States
- State: Ohio
- Counties: Union
- Elevation: 945 ft (288 m)
- Time zone: UTC-5 (Eastern (EST))
  - Summer (DST): UTC-4 (EDT)
- ZIP code: 43344
- Area code: 740
- GNIS feature ID: 1063100

Woodland is an unincorporated community in Jackson Township, Union County, Ohio, United States. It is located at the intersection of Woodland Road (Union County Highway 315) and Fox Road (Union County Highway 316), about five miles northeast of Richwood.

== History ==
Woodland had its start in the 1860s when a store and planing mill were built there. A post office was established at Woodland in 1869, and remained in operation until 1907.
