= Homer, Union County, Ohio =

Homer
- Ghost town
- Location within Ohio
- Coordinates: 40°7′19″N 83°27′27″W
- Country: United States
- State: Ohio
- County: Union
- Established: 1834

Homer is an extinct town in Union County, in the U.S. state of Ohio.

== History ==
Homer was platted in 1834, and for a time its prospects were considered good, but the town had declined by around 1840. By the 1880s, Homer was already a ghost town.
