= Pottersburg, Ohio =

- Unincorporated community
- Location within Ohio
- Coordinates: 40°15′59″N 83°30′01″W
- Country: United States
- State: Ohio
- Counties: Union
- Elevation: 1,083 ft (330 m)
- Time zone: UTC-5 (Eastern (EST))
  - Summer (DST): UTC-4 (EDT)
- ZIP code: 43040
- Area codes: 937, 326
- GNIS feature ID: 1057936

Pottersburg (originally known as Pottersburgh) is an unincorporated community in Allen Township, Union County, Ohio, United States. It is located along U.S. Route 33 between Marysville and Bellefontaine, about four miles (6.4 km) west of Marysville.

== History ==
Pottersburg was laid out along the Atlantic and Great Western Railroad in 1868. That same year, a sawmill was built. The Pottersburg Post Office was originally established as the Pottersburgh Post Office on June 29, 1869. In 1872, the railway company built a railroad depot and a telegraph office. As of 1877, the community contained two stores, one warehouse, one telegraph office, and the district school-house. The post office name was changed to Pottersburg Post Office on June 1, 1894, and later discontinued on October 30, 1926. The mail service is delivered through the Marysville branch.
