= Fleetwood Park, Ohio =

- Unincorporated community
- Location within Ohio
- Coordinates: 40°15′01″N 83°22′05″W
- Country: United States
- State: Ohio
- Counties: Union
- Elevation: 971 ft (296 m)
- Time zone: UTC-5 (Eastern (EST))
  - Summer (DST): UTC-4 (EDT)
- ZIP code: 43040
- Area codes: 937, 326
- GNIS feature ID: 1056291

Fleetwood Park is an unincorporated community in Paris Township, Union County, Ohio, United States. It is surrounded by current Marysville.
