= Adena Pointe, Ohio =

- Unincorporated community
- Location within Ohio
- Coordinates: 40°13′06″N 83°21′40″W
- Country: United States
- State: Ohio
- Counties: Union
- Elevation: 994 ft (303 m)
- Time zone: UTC-5 (Eastern (EST))
  - Summer (DST): UTC-4 (EDT)
- ZIP code: 43040
- Area codes: 937, 326
- GNIS feature ID: 2771072

Adena Pointe is an unincorporated community in Paris Township, Union County, Ohio, United States. It is located just South of Marysville along Weaver Road.
