= Broadway, Ohio =

Unincorporated community in Ohio, U.S.

Coordinates: 40°20′28″N 83°24′44″W

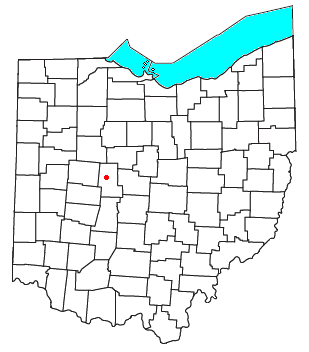
Location of Broadway, Ohio

Broadway is an unincorporated community in western Taylor Township, Union County, Ohio, United States. It has a post office with the ZIP code 43007. It lies along State Route 347 between Raymond and Magnetic Springs.

Broadway was one of the last communities to be organized in Union County. It was laid out along the Atlantic and Great Western Railroad, surrounded by giant forests which supplied the community with a great source of revenue. As of 1877, the community contained a spoke and hub factory, four dry goods and grocery stores, two drug stores, one grain warehouse, two blacksmith shops, one boot and shoe shop, a school-house, and a meeting house.

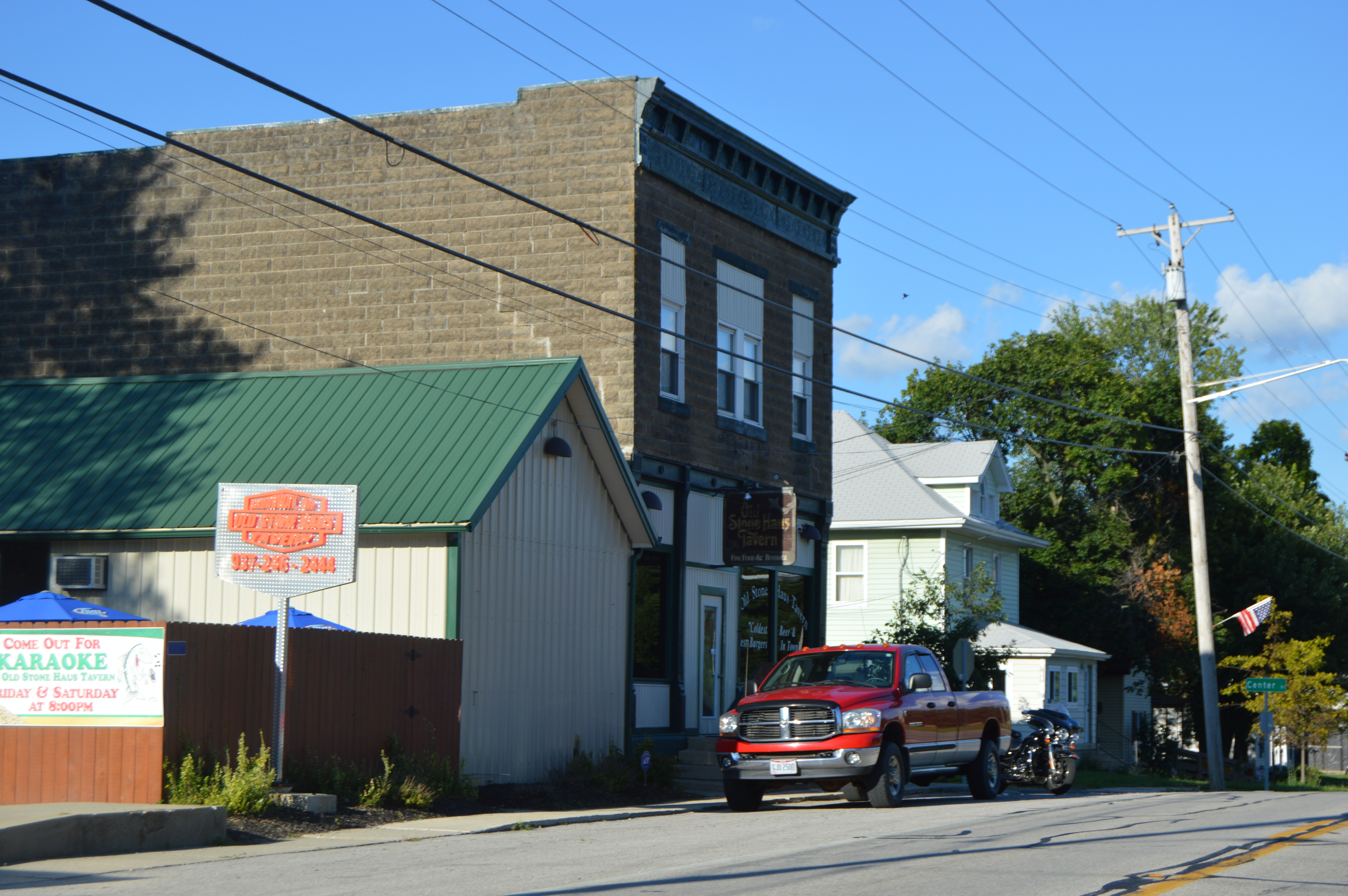
Main and Center Streets
