= Taylor Township, Union County, Ohio =

Township in Ohio, US

- Township
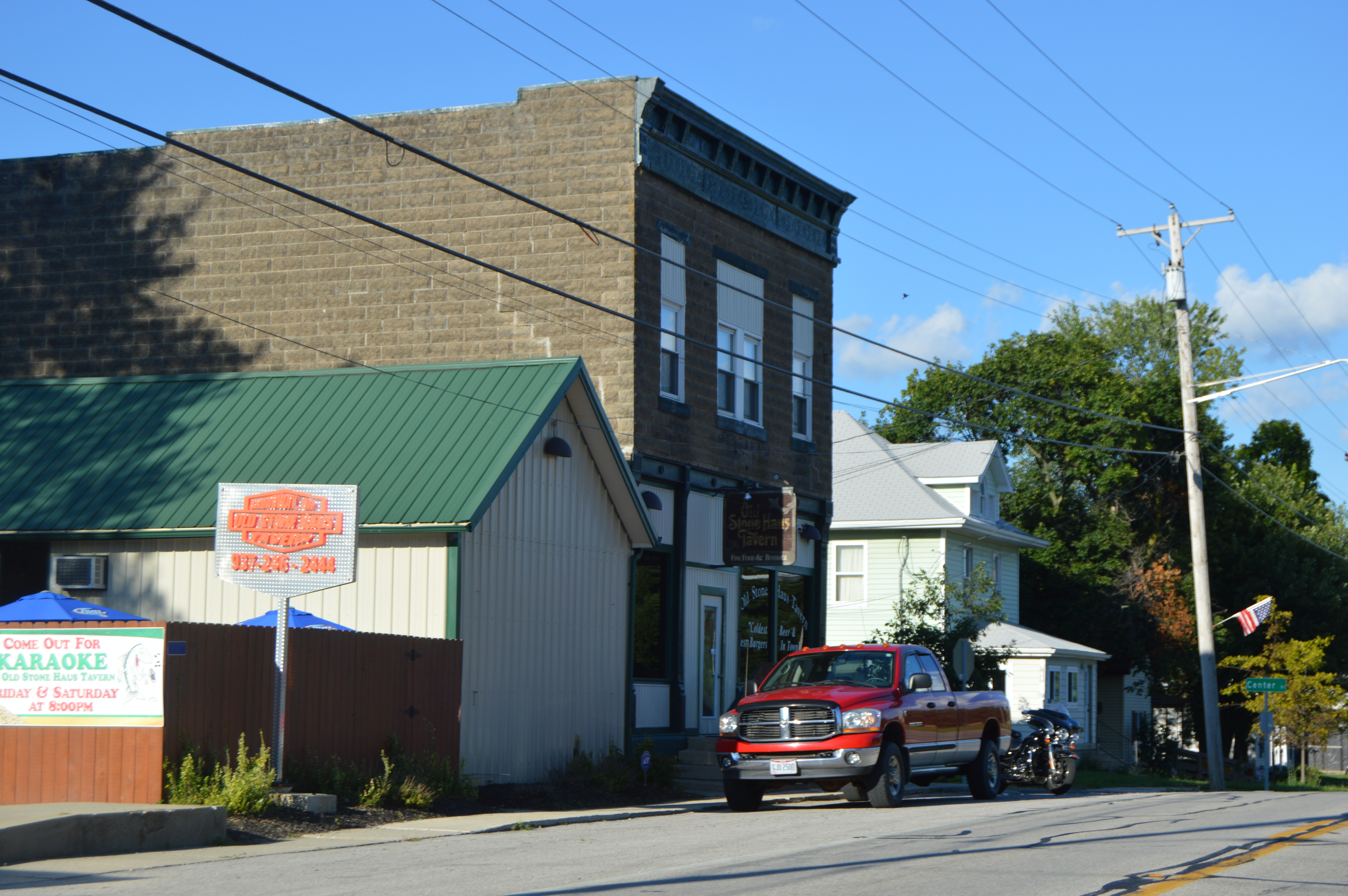
- State Route 347 in Broadway

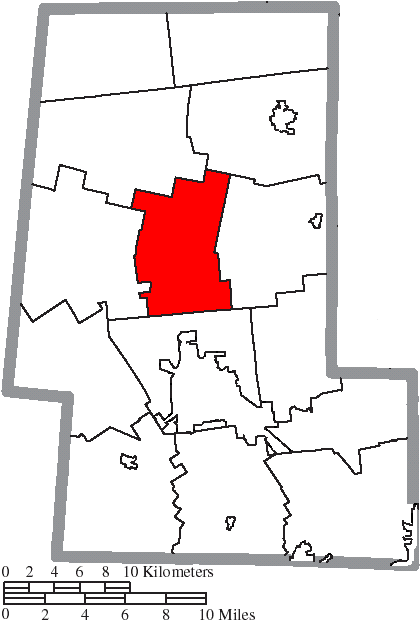
- Location of Taylor Township in Union County
- Coordinates: 40°20′52″N 83°23′34″W
- Country: United States
- State: Ohio
- County: Union

Area
  - Total: 26.6 sq mi (69.0 km^{2})
  - Land: 26.6 sq mi (69.0 km^{2})
  - Water: 0 sq mi (0.0 km^{2})
- Elevation: 1,001 ft (305 m)

Population (2020)
  - Total: 1,516
  - Density: 56.9/sq mi (22.0/km^{2})
- Time zone: UTC-5 (Eastern (EST))
  - Summer (DST): UTC-4 (EDT)
- FIPS code: 39-76194
- GNIS feature ID: 1087083

Taylor Township is one of the fourteen townships of Union County, Ohio, United States. The 2020 census found 1,516 people in the township.

== Geography ==
Located in the center of the county, it borders the following townships:

- Claibourne Township - northeast
- Leesburg Township - east
- Paris Township - south
- Liberty Township - west
- York Township - northwest

No municipalities are located in Taylor Township, although the unincorporated community (hamlet) of Broadway lies in the township's western midsection.

== Name and history ==
It is the only Taylor Township statewide, although there is a Taylor Creek Township in Hardin County.

Taylor was the last township to be organized in Union County, on December 5, 1849.

== Government ==
The township is administered by a three-member Board of Trustees, who are elected in November of odd-numbered years to a four-year term beginning on the following January 1. Two are elected in the year after a presidential election and one is elected in the year before it. There is also a township Fiscal Officer, who is elected in November of the year before a presidential election and serves a four-year term beginning on April 1 of the year after the election. Trustee and Fiscal Officer vacancies are filled through appointment by the remaining trustees.

For 2025, the elected officials (and end of term) are:

- Keith Snyder (20215), Trustee
- Beth Marshall (2025), Trustee
- Scott Weeks (2027), Trustee
- Tina Marshall (2027), Fiscal Officer
