= Liberty Township, Union County, Ohio =

Township in Ohio, US

- Township
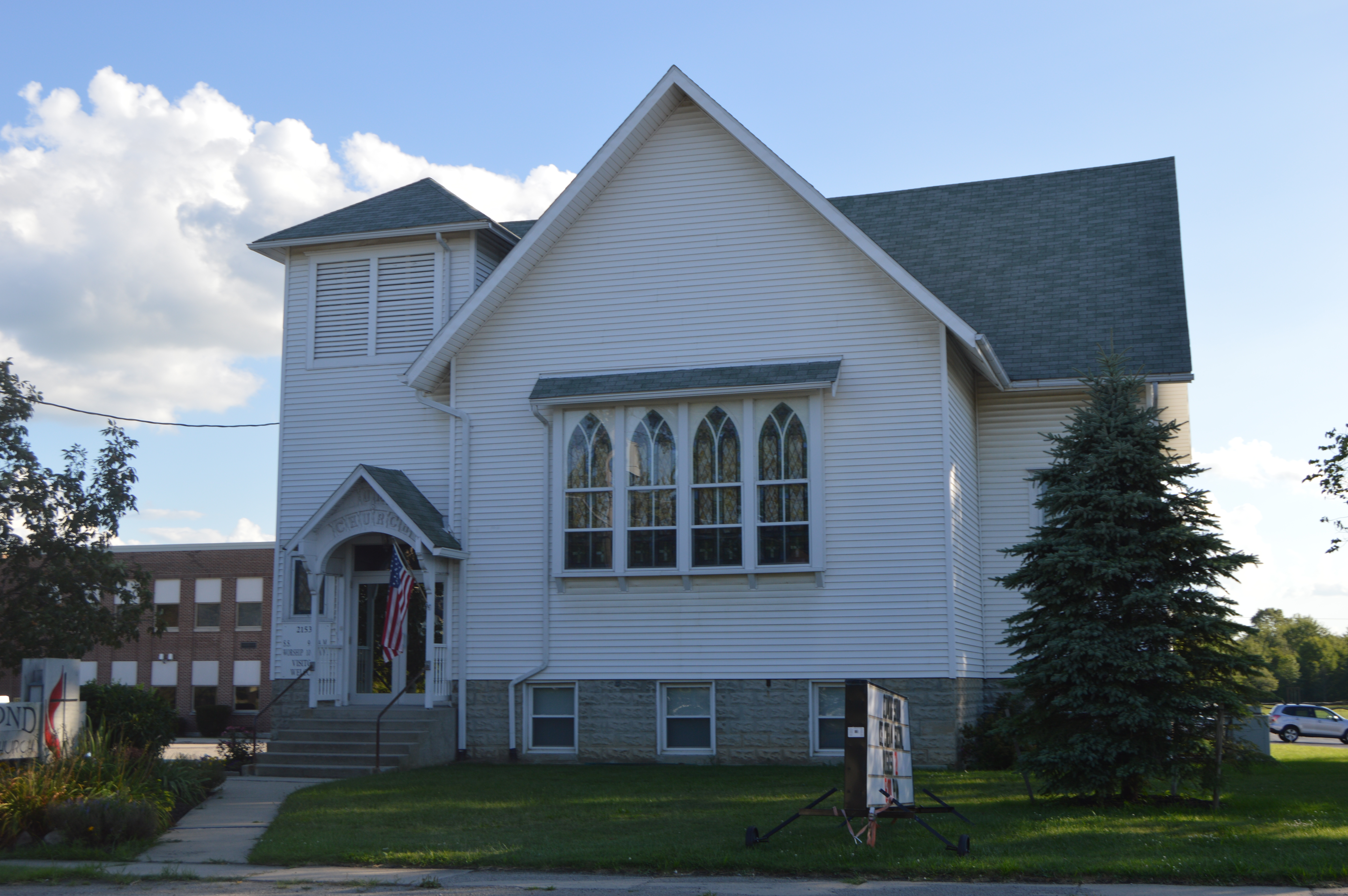
- Methodist church at Raymond

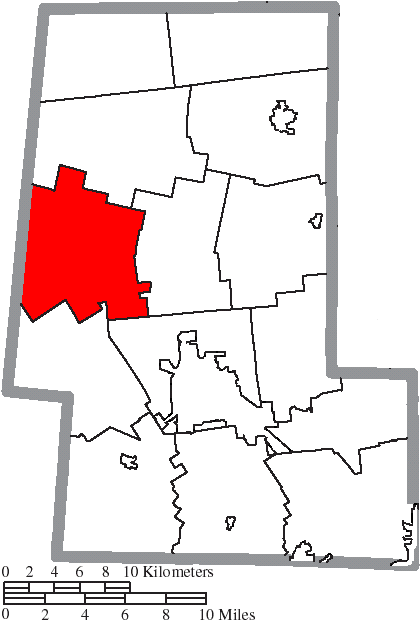
- Location of Liberty Township in Union County
- Coordinates: 40°20′1″N 83°28′51″W
- Country: United States
- State: Ohio
- County: Union

Area
  - Total: 36.7 sq mi (95.1 km^{2})
  - Land: 36.7 sq mi (95.1 km^{2})
  - Water: 0 sq mi (0.0 km^{2})
- Elevation: 1,056 ft (322 m)

Population (2020)
  - Total: 2,048
  - Density: 55.8/sq mi (21.5/km^{2})
- Time zone: UTC-5 (Eastern (EST))
  - Summer (DST): UTC-4 (EDT)
- FIPS code: 39-43358
- GNIS feature ID: 1087080

Liberty Township is one of the fourteen townships of Union County, Ohio, United States. The 2020 census found 2,048 people in the township.

== Geography ==
Located in the western part of the county, it borders the following townships:

- York Township - north
- Taylor Township - east
- Paris Township - southeast
- Allen Township - south
- Zane Township, Logan County - southwest
- Perry Township, Logan County - west

No municipalities are located in Liberty Township, although the census-designated place of Raymond lies in the township's east.

== Name and history ==
Liberty Township was organized in 1822. It is one of twenty-five Liberty Townships statewide.

== Government ==
The township is governed by a three-member board of trustees, who are elected in November of odd-numbered years to a four-year term beginning on the following January 1. Two are elected in the year after the presidential election and one is elected in the year before it. There is also an elected township fiscal officer, who serves a four-year term beginning on April 1 of the year after the election, which is held in November of the year before the presidential election. Vacancies in the fiscal officership or on the board of trustees are filled by the remaining trustees.
