= Claibourne Township, Union County, Ohio =

Township in Ohio, US

- Township
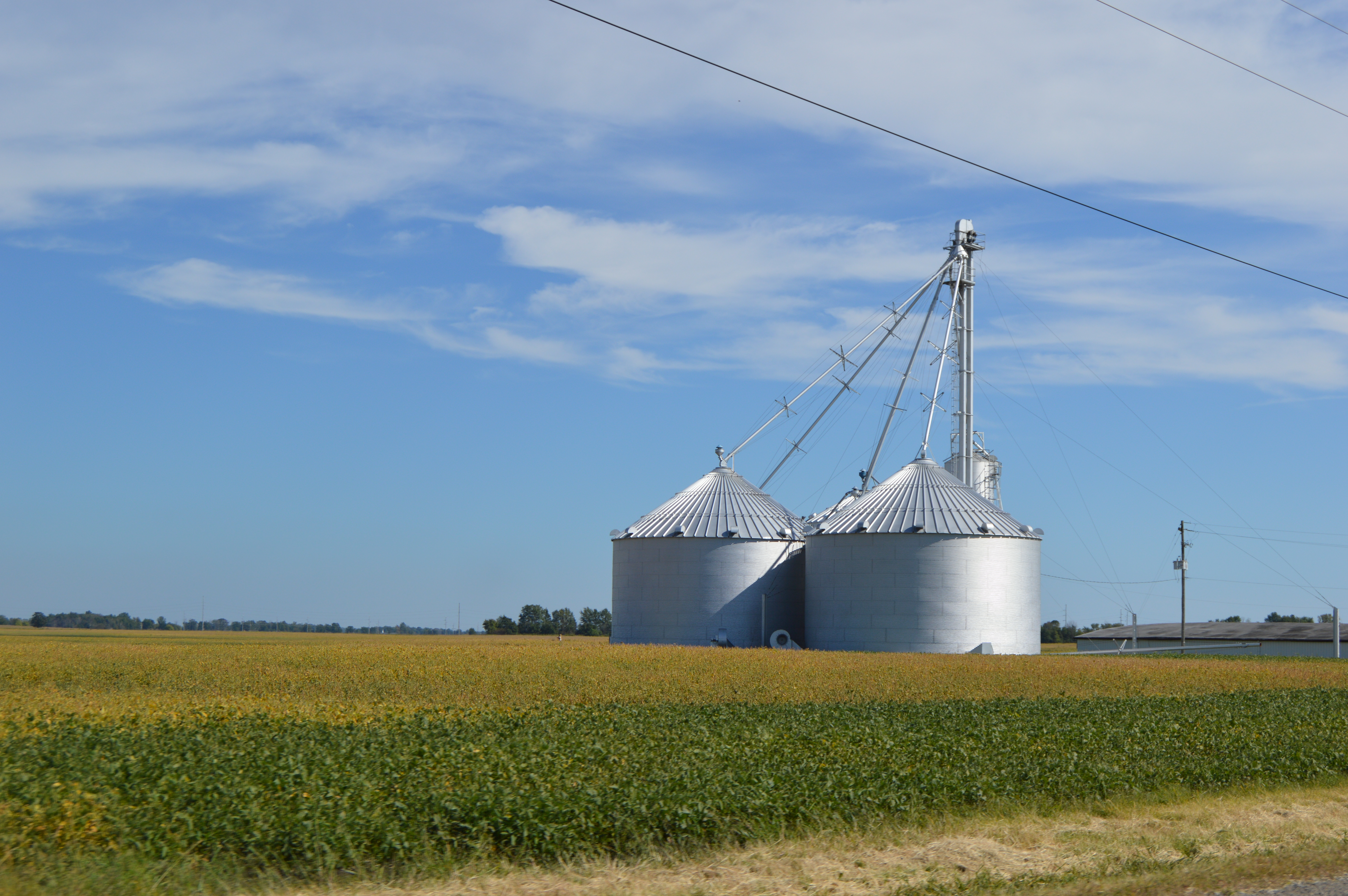
- State Route 37 north of Richwood

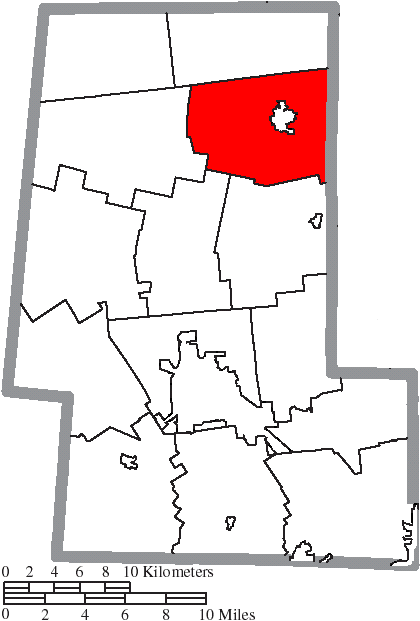
- Location of Claibourne Township in Union County
- Coordinates: 40°25′26″N 83°18′19″W
- Country: United States
- State: Ohio
- County: Union

Area
  - Total: 34.7 sq mi (89.9 km^{2})
  - Land: 34.7 sq mi (89.9 km^{2})
  - Water: 0 sq mi (0.0 km^{2})
- Elevation: 942 ft (287 m)

Population (2020)
  - Total: 3,481
  - Density: 100/sq mi (38.7/km^{2})
- Time zone: UTC-5 (Eastern (EST))
  - Summer (DST): UTC-4 (EDT)
- FIPS code: 39-15112
- GNIS feature ID: 1087074

Claibourne Township is one of the fourteen townships of Union County, Ohio, United States. The 2020 census found 3,481 people in the township, 2,222 of whom lived in the village of Richwood.

== Geography ==
Located in the northeastern part of the county, it borders the following townships:

- Jackson Township - north
- Prospect Township, Marion County - northeast
- Thompson Township, Delaware County - southeast
- Leesburg Township - south
- Taylor Township - southwest
- York Township - west

The village of Richwood is located in central Claibourne Township.

== Name and history ==
It is the only Claibourne Township statewide, and is named after the Buller Claibourne survey. The township was organized in 1834. As of 1854, the township was also known as 'Clairbourn', and the population was 919.

== Government ==
The township is governed by a three-member board of trustees, who are elected in November of odd-numbered years to a four-year term beginning on the following January 1. Two are elected in the year after the presidential election and one is elected in the year before it. There is also an elected township fiscal officer, who serves a four-year term beginning on April 1 of the year after the election, which is held in November of the year before the presidential election. Vacancies in the fiscal officership or on the board of trustees are filled by the remaining trustees.
