= Japanese community of Columbus, Ohio =

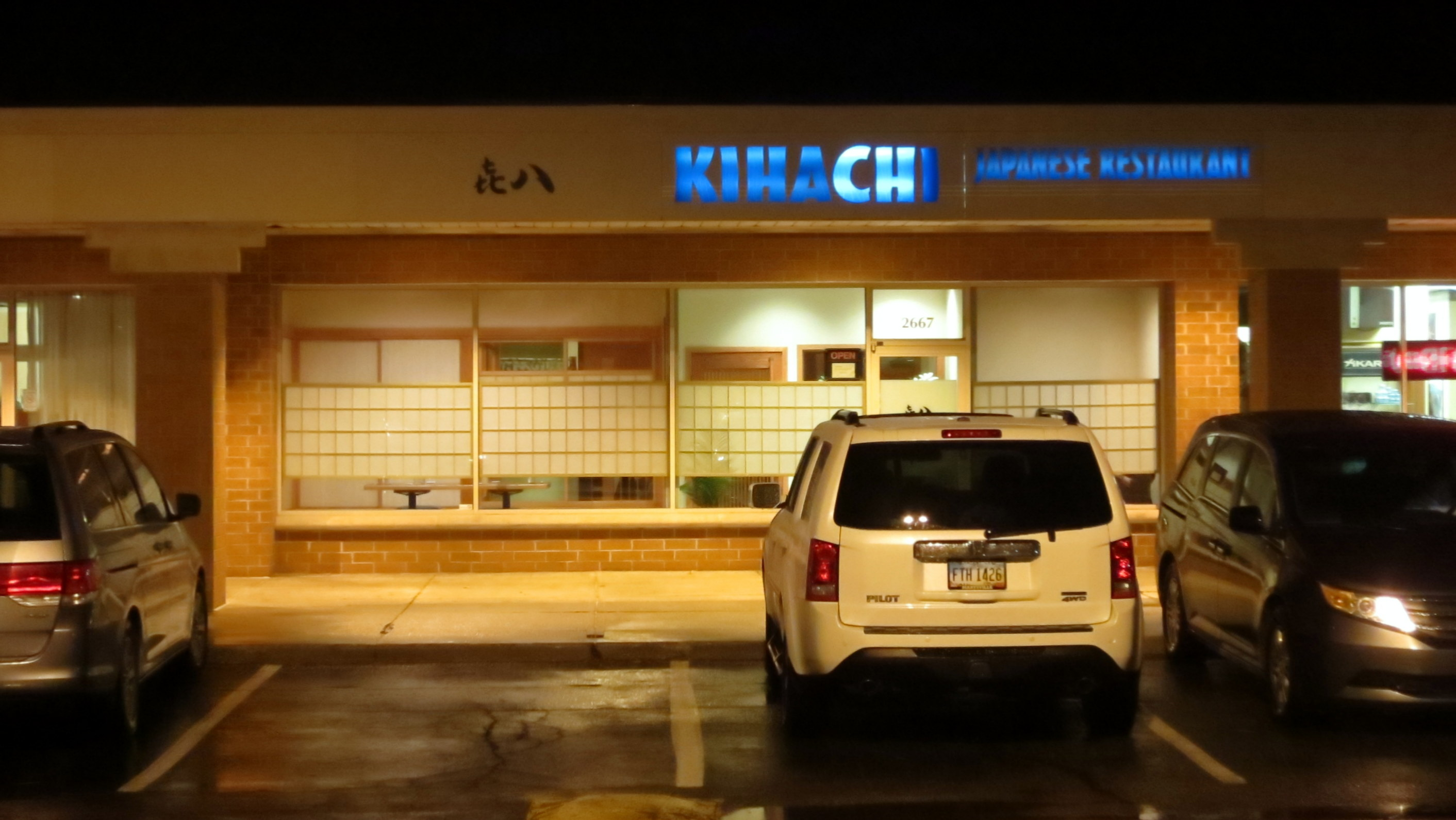
Honda automobiles parked in front of Kihachi Japanese Restaurant in Columbus, Ohio

There is a Japanese community in the Columbus, Ohio area.

The presence of Honda Motor Company and related suppliers attracted a population of Japanese expatriates to the Columbus area. In 2011 Bill Daley of the Chicago Tribune stated that "the international pull of Ohio State University" adds to the "real discernible Japanese flavor to" Columbus.

== History ==
Honda first established operations in Marysville in 1979. Japanese people began living in Dublin and other suburbs instead of Marysville because Dublin established a support system for Japanese residents and the suburbs offered Saturday schools for Japanese residents. Therefore, as of 2013, few Japanese lived in Marysville.

In 2012 Columbus received twenty cherry trees from the Japanese government and they were planted at the Franklin Park Conservatory and Botanical Gardens on April 27 of that year.

== Demographics ==
Of all regions of Ohio, central Ohio has the largest Japanese national population. According to the "2013 Japanese Direct Investment Survey" by the Consulate-General of Japan in Detroit, Dublin had 2,002 Japanese nationals and Columbus had 705 Japanese nationals, giving those cities in the highest such populations in the state.

As of the 2010 U.S. census, 1,071 Japanese people lived in Dublin, making up 2.6% of the city's population. As of that year, 122 Japanese lived in Union County, making up 0.2% of the county's population. Holly Zachariah of The Columbus Dispatch stated that "It has been that way historically."

== Economy ==
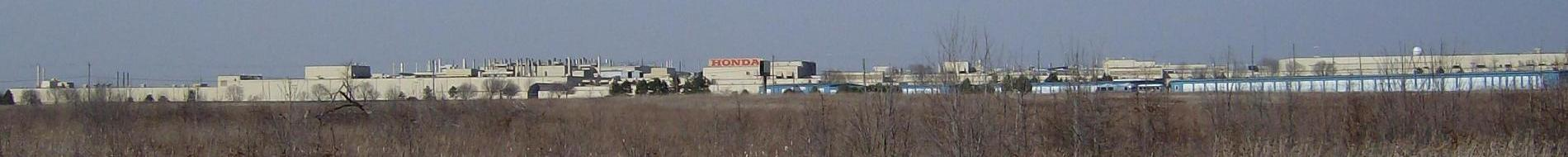
The Honda Marysville Auto Plant

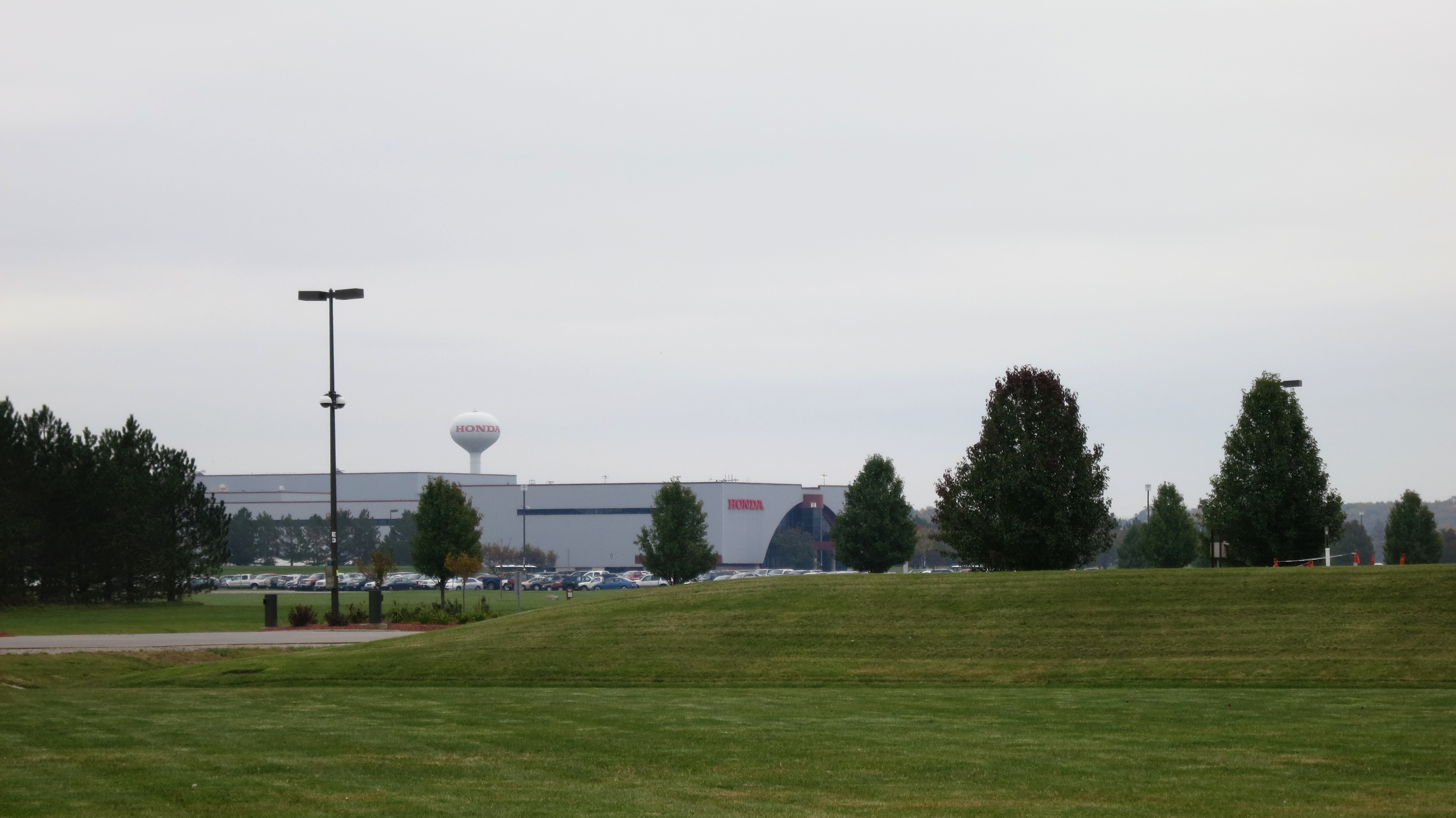
The Honda East Liberty Auto Plant (as seen from Ohio State Route 347) is located approximately 35 miles northwest of Dublin, Ohio.

Honda Motor Company operates the Marysville Auto Plant in Marysville and the East Liberty Auto Plant in East Liberty. There are also Honda operations outside of Columbus, including an engine plant near Anna and a transmissions operation in Russells Point. In addition, there are suppliers serving Honda in the Columbus area. As of 2011, a total of 83 Japanese companies have operations in Greater Columbus.

== Education ==
In 2013 a RE/MAX real estate agent named Akiko Miyamoto (宮本亜希子 Miyamoto Akiko) stated in Car Talk that the services provided for Japanese speakers by the Dublin City School District attract Japanese expatriates to Dublin.

The Columbus Japanese Language School, a weekend supplementary Japanese school, serves the area.

== Culture and recreation ==
Each year the city holds the Asian Festival. Over 100,000 people come to the festival annually. In addition, the Billy Ireland Cartoon Library & Museum at Ohio State University has the largest collection of manga that is not in Japan.

In 2011 Daley wrote that "The number of Japanese restaurants in and around Columbus ranges from 19 to at least 40, depending on who's counting, and there are dozens more if you tally restaurants under a generic "Asian" theme." Daley stated that Kihachi (㐂八 or 喜八; "㐂" means "喜" or "happy"), a restaurant in Northwest, Columbus, was "so highly regarded" to the point that it was featured in an episode of Anthony Bourdain: No Reservations. In that episode, Anthony Bourdain and Michael Ruhlman visited Kihachi. The restaurant closed in 2018 as the owner decided to retire.

The Columbus Japanese Women’s Chorus (はなみずきの会 Hanamizuki no Kai "dogwood group") includes members of the Japanese community. It was founded in 1995. The group name is a reference to the dogwood trees given to Japan by the United States.
