= Tracy Richardson =

American politician (born 1965)

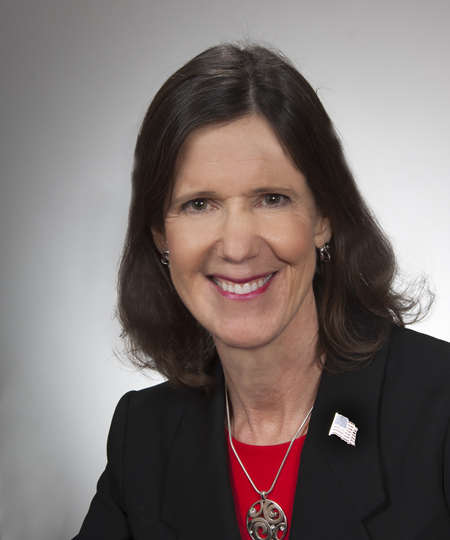

Member of the Ohio House of Representatives from the 86th district
- Incumbent
- Assumed office January 6, 2019
- Preceded by: Dorothy Pelanda

Personal details
- Born: April 4, 1965 (age 61) Marysville, Ohio
- Party: Republican

Tracy Richardson (born January 21, 1965) is an American politician who has served as a member of the Ohio House of Representatives representing the 86th district since 2019. A Republican, Richardson's district includes Union County and the majority of Marion County. A graduate of the United States Military Academy, Richardson served in Operation Desert Shield where she earned a Bronze Star. She currently serves in the Army National Guard. Prior to elected office, Richardson served as a human resources officer for a number of different companies. She also served on the Marysville City Council for nearly nine years.

In 2019, state Representative Dorothy Liggett Pelanda opted not to seek reelection to her state House seat, and Richardson easily won the Republican primary to succeed her. She went on to win the general election with nearly 70% of the vote.

Tracy currently serves as chair of the Veterans and Military Development Committee.

== Association with Team Householder ==
During the 2018 Ohio House election cycle, Tracy Richardson was identified in reporting as one of the Republican candidates recruited by then-State Representative Larry Householder as part of an organized effort to regain the speakership of the Ohio House of Representatives. According to an investigation by Cleveland.com, Householder assembled a slate of candidates, commonly referred to as “Team Householder,” who were encouraged to run for office with the expectation that they would support his bid for Speaker if elected. Schmidt was listed among the candidates recruited as part of this strategy.

The successful election of multiple Team Householder candidates enabled Householder to secure enough internal support to be elected Speaker at the start of the 133rd Ohio General Assembly.

This reporting occurred amid broader investigations that later became known as the Ohio nuclear bribery scandal.

== Abortion Legislation ==
In 2019, Richardson co-sponsored legislation that would ban abortion in Ohio and criminalize what they called "abortion murder". Doctors who performed abortions in cases of ectopic pregnancy and other life-threatening conditions would be exempt from prosecution only if they "[took] all possible steps to preserve the life of the unborn child, while preserving the life of the woman. Such steps include, if applicable, attempting to reimplant an ectopic pregnancy into the woman's uterus". Reimplantation of an ectopic pregnancy is not a recognized or medically feasible procedure.

== Electoral history ==
Election results
Year	Office	Election	Subject	Party	Votes	%	Opponent	Party	Votes	%	Opponent	Party	Votes	%
2018	Ohio House of Representatives	Primary	Tracy Richardson	Republican	6,627	71.76%	Matthew Sammons	Republican	2,608	28.24%				
2018	Ohio House of Representatives	General	Tracy Richardson	Republican	28,205	68.32%	Glenn Coble	Democratic	11,563	28.01%	Taylor Hoffman	Libertarian	1,513	3.67%
2020	Ohio House of Representatives	Primary	Tracy Richardson	Republican	9,762	100.00%								
2020	Ohio House of Representatives	General	Tracy Richardson	Republican	39,510	70.37%	Tiffanie Roberts	Democratic	16,635	29.63%				
2022	Ohio House of Representatives	Primary	Tracy Richardson	Republican	3,900	78.92%	Michael Bohland	Republican	1,042	21.08%				
2022	Ohio House of Representatives	General	Tracy Richardson	Republican	26,604	68.76%	Barbara Luke	Democratic	12,089	31.24%				
2024	Ohio House of Representatives	Primary	Tracy Richardson	Republican	8,091	59.78%	Wezlynn Davis	Republican	5,443	40.22%				
2024	Ohio House of Representatives	General	Tracy Richardson	Republican	37,571	68.94%	Lesley Verbus	Democratic	16,927	31.06%				

== Links ==
- Representative Tracy Richardson (official site)
