= MEVSD =

MEVSD may refer to:

- Marysville Exempted Village Schools District
- Milford Exempted Village School District, which operates Milford High School (Ohio)
