= KMRT =

KMRT may refer to:

- Kaohsiung Metro, a transit system in Kaohsiung, Taiwan
- KMRT, the ICAO airport code for Union County Airport, Ohio, United States
