= CJLS =

CJLS may refer to:

- The Committee on Jewish Law and Standards of the Conservative Movement of Judaism
- CJLS-FM, a radio station based in Yarmouth, Nova Scotia, Canada
- Columbus Japanese Language School
