= Gary Shirk =

American football player (born 1950)

No. 87
- Position: Tight end

Personal information
- Born: February 23, 1950 (age 76); Marysville, Ohio, U.S.
- Listed height: 6 ft 1 in (1.85 m)
- Listed weight: 220 lb (100 kg)

Career information
- High school: Marysville
- College: Morehead State
- NFL draft: 1976: undrafted

Career history
- Memphis Southmen (1974-1975); New York Giants (1976–1982); Memphis Showboats (1984-1985)

Career NFL statistics
- Receptions: 130
- Receiving yards: 1,640
- Receiving TDs: 11
- Stats at Pro Football Reference

Gary Lee Shirk (born February 23, 1950) is an American former professional football player who was a tight end for seven seasons with the New York Giants of the National Football League (NFL). He also played in the World Football League (WFL) for the Memphis Southmen and in the United States Football League (USFL) for the Memphis Showboats. Shirk played college football for the Morehead State Eagles.

Shirk attended Marysville High School in Ohio before moving on to Morehead State University where he was a four-year starter and was the team MVP in 1972. After playing for Memphis in the WFL in 1974 and 1975, Shirk moved on to the NFL, playing for the New York Giants from 1976 until 1982. He played in 101 games for the Giants, with 34 games started, and caught 130 passes for 1640 yards and 11 touchdowns before being released during the 1983 pre-season. From 1979 to 1982, his QB in New York was another former Morehead State Eagle, Phil Simms. Shirk also played for the USFL Memphis Showboats after his NFL playing days. Shirk was inducted into the Kentucky Football of Fame in 2010 and the Morehead State University Athletics Hall of Fame in 2014.
