= Marysville High School (Ohio) =

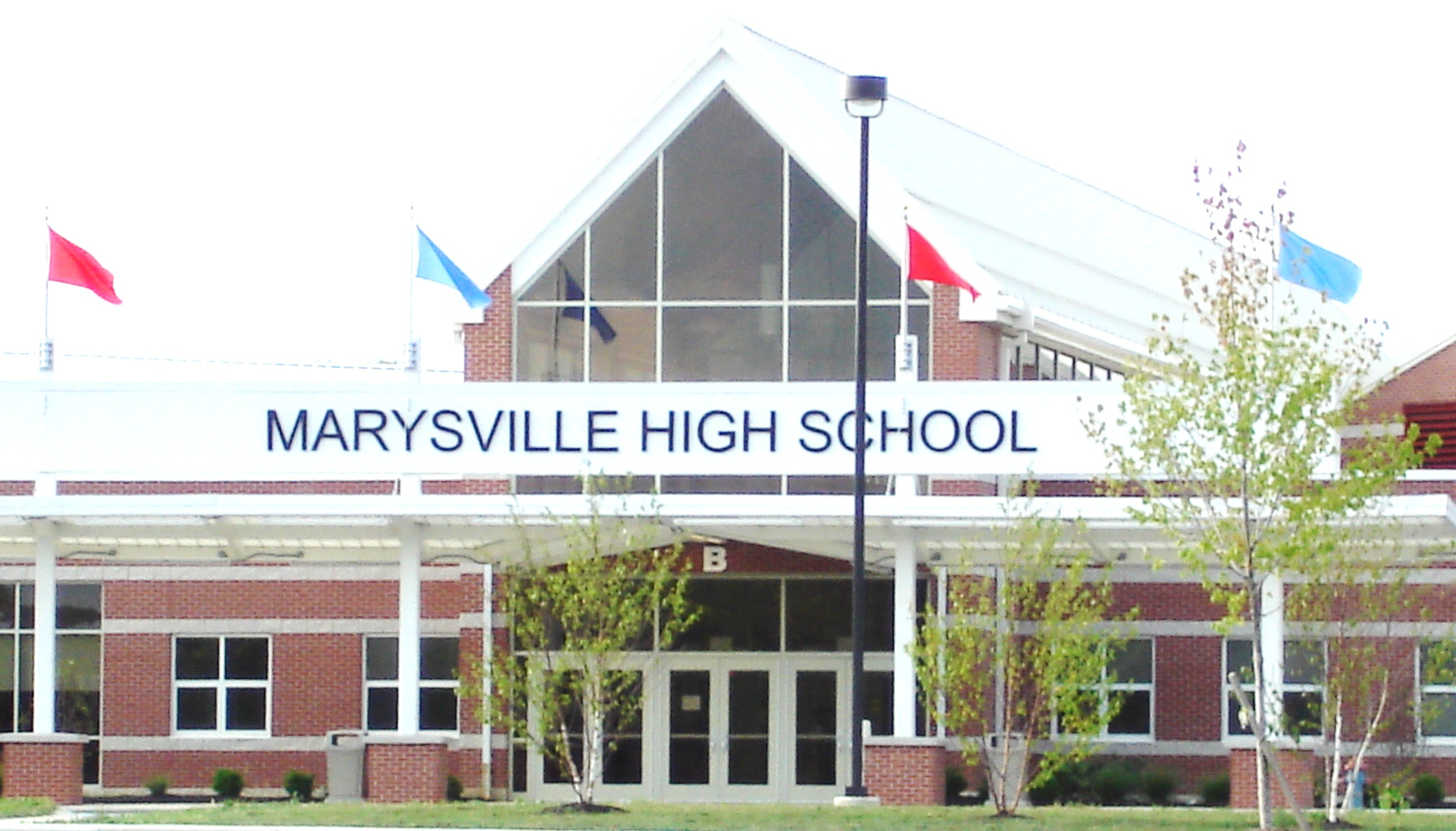

Location
- 800 Amrine Mill Road; Marysville, Ohio 43040; United States
- Coordinates: 40°15′01″N 83°22′51″W

Information
- Type: Public, Secondary
- School district: Marysville Exempted Village Schools
- Teaching staff: 54.70 (FTE)
- Enrollment: 1,097 (2023-2024)
- Student to teacher ratio: 20.05
- Colors: Red and Blue
- Athletics conference: Ohio Capital Conference Cardinal Division
- Mascot: Monarch
- Website: mhs.marysville.k12.oh.us

Marysville High School (MHS) is a public high school in Marysville, Ohio. It is the only comprehensive high school in Marysville Exempted Village School District, but is accompanied by the Marysville Early College High School (casually known as "STEM" or "ECHS"). MHS's school mascot is the "Monarch", which is a lion that symbolizes the "King (Monarch) of the Jungle".

The district includes almost all of the land territory of Marysville, as well as the census-designated place of Raymond.

== Athletics ==
Marysville offers many athletic teams, including football, baseball, boys and girls basketball, softball, volleyball, boys and girls soccer, track and field, cross country, boys and girls lacrosse, swimming, boys and girls golf, boys and girls tennis, bowling, and wrestling. Club sports include gymnastics. The mascot for MHS athletics is the Monarch. The Monarch is not the butterfly, but rather the Monarch lion.

== Extracurricular activities ==
The school's Latin Club functions as a local chapter of both the Ohio Junior Classical League (OJCL) and National Junior Classical League (NJCL).

MHS has a competitive show choir, "Swingers Unlimited". The group has won several competitions in the 21st century. The school has also hosted its own competition since 1991.

== Notable alumni ==
- Robert S. Beightler (1892-1978), American general
- Chase Blackburn (born 1983), National Football League linebacker (New York Giants)
- Arthur E. Drumm (1929-2014), inventor and former Marine
- Nathan Gale (1979-2004), perpetrator of the Columbus nightclub shooting
- Dorothy Pelanda (born 1956), lawyer
- Gary Shirk (born 1950), football tight end (New York Giants, Memphis Southmen, Memphis Showboats)
- Bill Wall (1931-2014), USA Basketball executive and college head coach (MacMurray)
