= All Ohio Balloon Festival =

Festival

The All-Ohio Balloon Festival is an annual hot air balloon showcase held at the Union County Airport in Marysville, Ohio. In addition to hot air balloons, the event hosts rides in helicopters, airplanes, and balloons; live music; and food in addition to various activities for kids. Other attractions include skydivers and pets for adoption.

== History ==
The festival is the longest-running balloon festival in the United States. The event has been held at the Union County Airport since 1975. It will celebrate its 50th anniversary in 2025. The festival has since grown to attract 30,000 people per year.

The festival is a non-profit event that benefits different charities every year.

== Attractions ==
The event attracts balloons from around the country and world. Balloons usually come from as far as Florida and California. The 2023 event featured Darth Vader and Yoda balloons from Belgium.

The event takes place over a three-day period each summer. Each day features a Hot Air Balloon Launch and a Nightly Balloon Glow.

The event often hosts displays of historic aircraft such as B-25 bombers.

The airport has hosted a number of notable performers, including The Beach Boys, The Wallflowers, and ZZ Top. The Beach Boys were scheduled to play the 2020 festival before it was canceled due to the COVID-19 pandemic, but they returned to perform during the 2023 event.

The event also often features a 5k run.
