= Arthur E. Drumm =

American inventor (1929–2014)

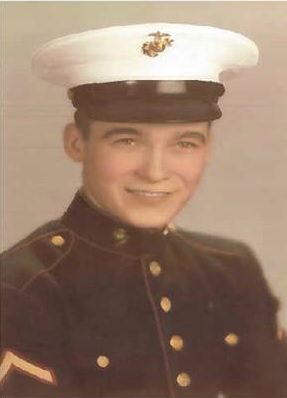
- United States Marine Corps. service photograph of Drumm, c. 1950
- Born: December 6, 1929; Marysville, Ohio, US
- Died: May 26, 2014 (aged 84); Marysville, Ohio, US
- Occupations: Inventor, industrialist
- Known for: Founded Marysville Rotary Broom Service, Inc, Drumm Industries
- Spouse: Roberta Bumpus (m. 1952)
- Children: 3

Arthur Elwood Drumm (December 6, 1929 – May 26, 2014) was an American inventor, environmentalist, military subcontractor, and industrialist of the modern street sweeping broom industry, as well as a publisher.

== Biography ==
Born in Marysville, Ohio, Arthur Drumm was one of 14 brothers and sisters; the son of Francis Drumm, of Bavarian origin, and Evelyn Warner. His father was a descendant of Guillaume de Kay, a Lord-Director of the Dutch West Indies Company and old Knickerbocker family. De Kay was of French Huguenot origin. Through his father, he is also a descendant of Pietro di Bobone.

Raised during the Great Depression, Drumm worked on his father's farm from a very young age. He graduated from Marysville High School in 1948, and then joined the Marine Corps. He achieved the rank of Staff sergeant in just four years before his discharge.

While stationed in San Francisco, Drumm met his wife, Roberta Bumpus, whom he married in Reno, Nevada in 1952. By the time she came of age, she was living in the Eastshore Park neighborhood of Richmond, California. Her father Frederick, the uncle of painter Linda McCrary, was a pipeline technician at the Standard Oil Refinery. Roberta worked as a comptometrist at the California Research Corporation and was a descendant of Governor Stephen Paynter of Bermuda, the colonial Reynolds family of Isle of Wight County, Virginia, and Olof Persson Stille, the first Chief Justice of the New Sweden colony. She was the mtDNA haplogroup T1a.

Returning home, Drumm would earn an apprenticeship in machinery, and would manage his own farm in Marysville until his 30s while raising his young daughters.

=== Industrial Brooms ===
Drumm would become involved in the industrial broom industry. Industrial brooms became an emerging conservation product in the 20th century as the world moved toward more environmentally-friendly practices. They remove harmful substances and pollutants from the roads that would otherwise drain off into vegetation and/or water sources, or be continually carried and pushed around by vehicles and other street traffic. They add longevity to asphalt through cleansing and preventing early decay. This in turn cuts down on the environmentally harmful practices of consistently paving and the manufacturing of toxic asphalt. They prevent flooding by collecting debris that would accumulate and block storm drains.

==== Marysville Rotary Broom Service, Inc. ====
In 1964, Drumm started Marysville Rotary Broom Service, Inc. in his machine shop, which was on the property of his home and farm. He would sell locally and regionally through "word of mouth." In the late 1960s he would develop a machine which made the manufacturing of wafer brooms cheaper and faster through a mechanical process, versus the old manual process. This gave the business an advantage, and production increased dramatically. During this time Drumm would acquire his steel from the infant Worthington Industries corporation, in which he said John H. McConnell would personally load shipments into his trucks.

By the 1970s, the company had become a notable player in the industry, selling nationally and worldwide. Drumm would obtain several more U.S. patents in the years to come, which included intellectual property for core mounting assemblies, sweeper brushes, rotary broom core assemblages, spiral brushes, and brush bristle units. The machine shop Drumm had started in eventually would be transformed into a modern factory through additions and new construction during this period.

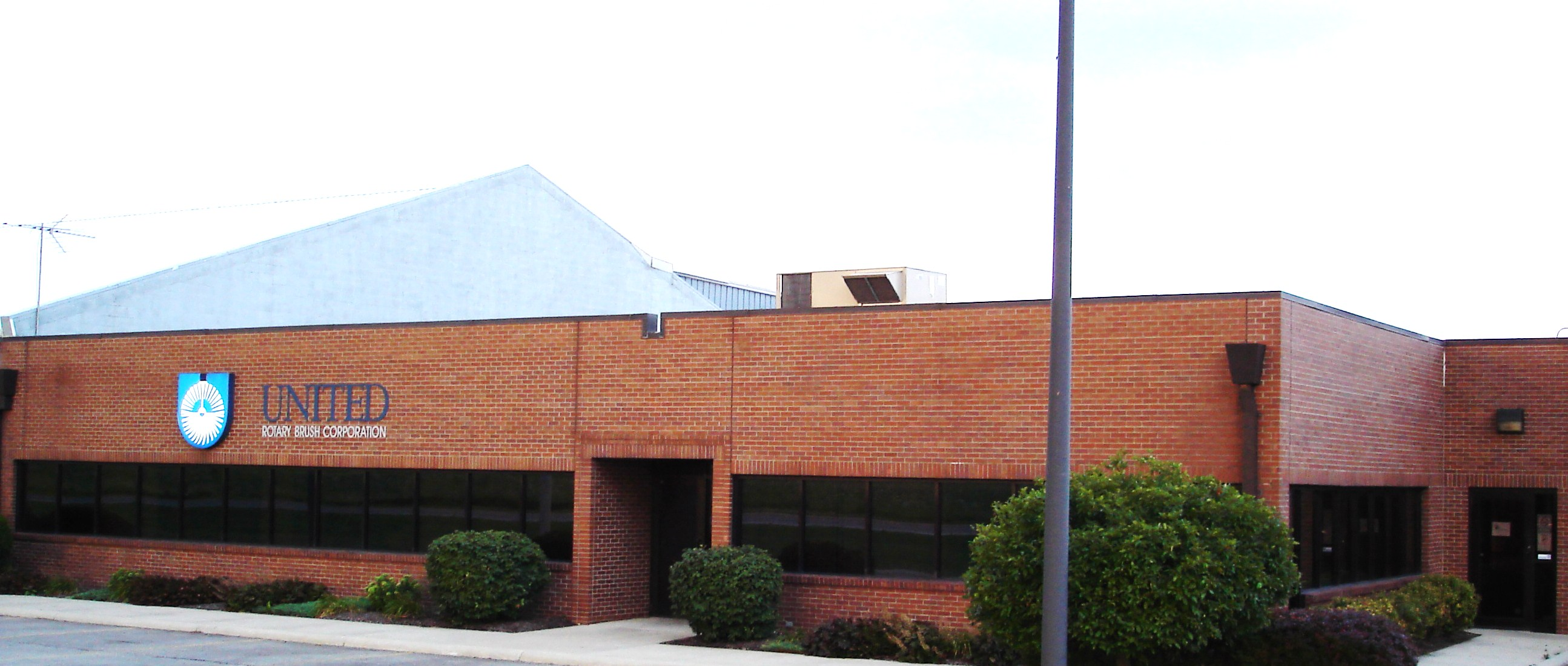
Present-day building where Marysville Rotary Brush was located

The company reached its pinnacle under Drumm by the mid-1980s. It was attracting attention from all over with various interests, including being featured on the local WBNS-TV evening news in a story about Reaganomics and the successful impact it was having locally on the economy with businesses.

For personal reasons, Drumm would let go of Marysville Rotary Broom Service, Inc., eventually being bought out in 1985 by Dick Savage. Kennedy Brush, Savage's other industrial broom manufacturing company, and Marysville Rotary Broom Service, Inc. would merge in 1990 to form United Rotary Brush.

==== Drumm Industries ====
Shortly after he sold Marysville Rotary Broom Service, Inc., Drumm would start a new company, Drumm Industries, where he would manufacture push brooms for a short period until a no-compete contract would expire. In 1988 he would receive a patent for a push broom head of the channel-mounted bristle type. He would then focus a considerable amount of time innovating a replaceable strip brush. This changed the whole process of manufacturing tube-brooms, as one tube could be recycled simply by replacing the brush through replaceable slide-on strips, versus the old method of wrapping the brush around the tube, welding it together, and shipping the tube back for a replacement wrap when it was worn out, or scrapping the tube altogether. Drumm would obtain several patents relating to the strip brush innovation.

Drumm Industries would eventually be sold to Sweepster in 1999.

=== Real estate and publishing ===
At the time of his passing in 2014, Drumm's real estate portfolio was valued at $1.1 million. Through the years he owned 15785 U.S. 36, which was sold to form the original Marysville Wal-Mart shopping center, 337 Main St. in Russells Point, home to his Indian Lake Publishing company, a venture with his wife and daughter which published the Indian Lake Beacon, and written by her and his son-in-law Mark Beightler, as well 20078 St. Rt. 4, which is presently home to Mai Manufacturing.

=== Family, retirement, and death ===
Following retirement, Drumm would spend time with his family traveling and at his estate, Arthur's Point, on Orchard Island, Ohio. He enjoyed feeding deer and squirrel. Arthur Drumm died in 2014 in his hometown of Marysville on Memorial Day.

His wife Roberta, died July 28, 2014, in Fayetteville, Georgia.

==== Stephen Beightler ====
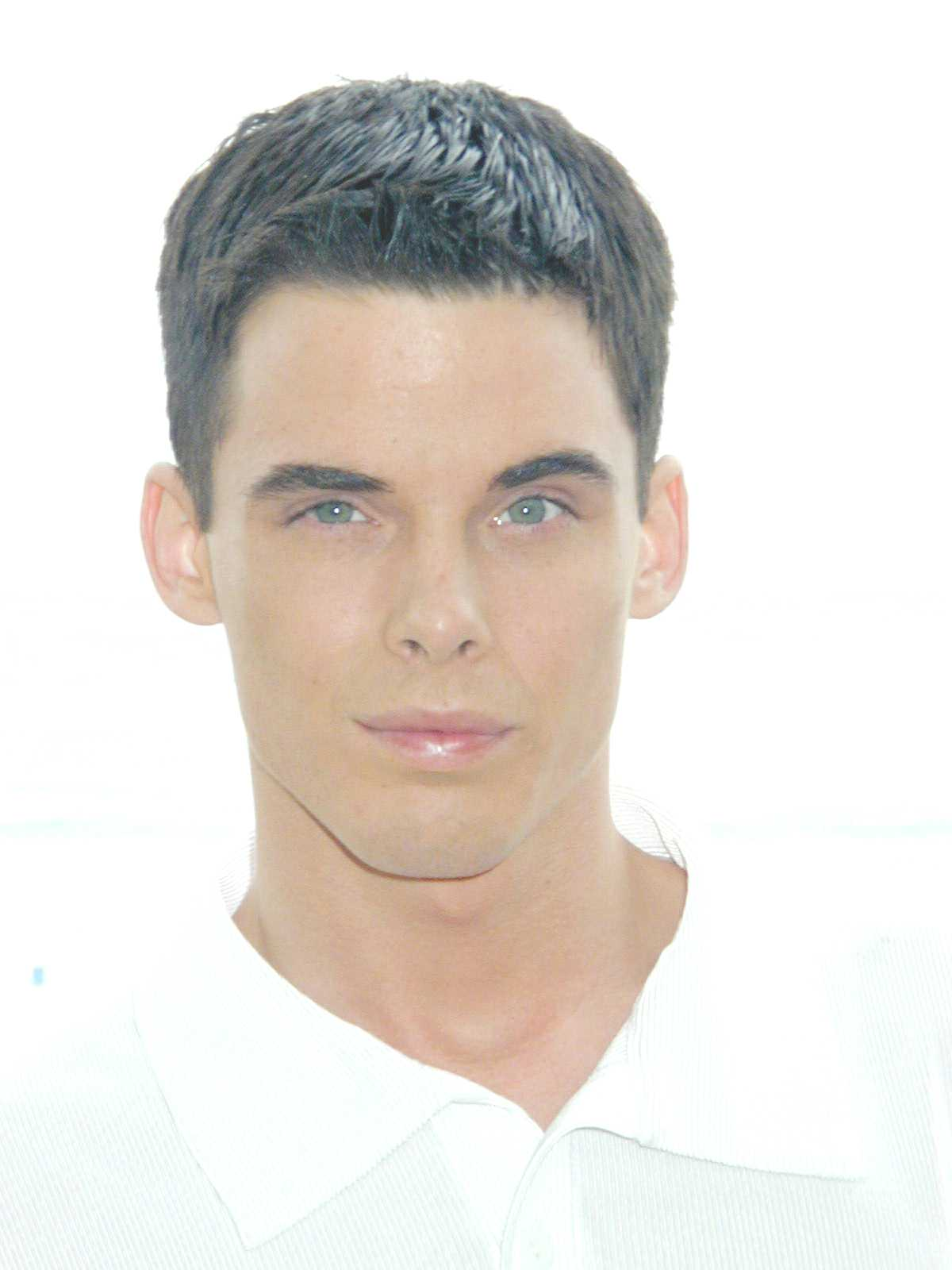
Stephen Beightler headshot, 2003

Stephen Beightler is the grandson of Arthur and Roberta, who is a former New York City model. He appeared in Steven Meisel’s Meisel Style underwear campaign in 2000, and featured in Nena's "Nur Getraumt" music video filmed at CBGB in New York City in 2003. Other work includes “Barbel Boy” for Tony Miguel in Los Angeles in 2002, as well as a runway show for Goldwell in San Francisco at the Intercontinental Mark Hopkins Hotel in 2000. He has appeared as an extra in several productions, including “The Emperor's Club" in 2001 in New York City. He began modeling in high school in 1999 while attending Dublin Coffman High School in Dublin, Ohio, working runway shows at the Columbus Convention Center for L’anza being represented by Active Image of Columbus. He has also been represented by Grant Wilfley in New York City.

==== Custom Augers ====
In 2004 he was issued patent along with his son-in-law, which improved an auger boring device. This invention is celebrated as progress in the history cited in a patent obtained in 2007 by another individual. The "ground-breaking" product was part of a joint venture he became involved with called Custom Augers.

==== Military honors ====
The Drumm Family was honored by the Union County, Ohio, Veterans Remembrance Committee on Veterans Day, 2008, where a ceremony was held at the Veterans Memorial in Marysville honoring the family's military service. He was a member of the American Legion, Union Post 79.
