= Chase Blackburn =

American football player and coach (born 1983)

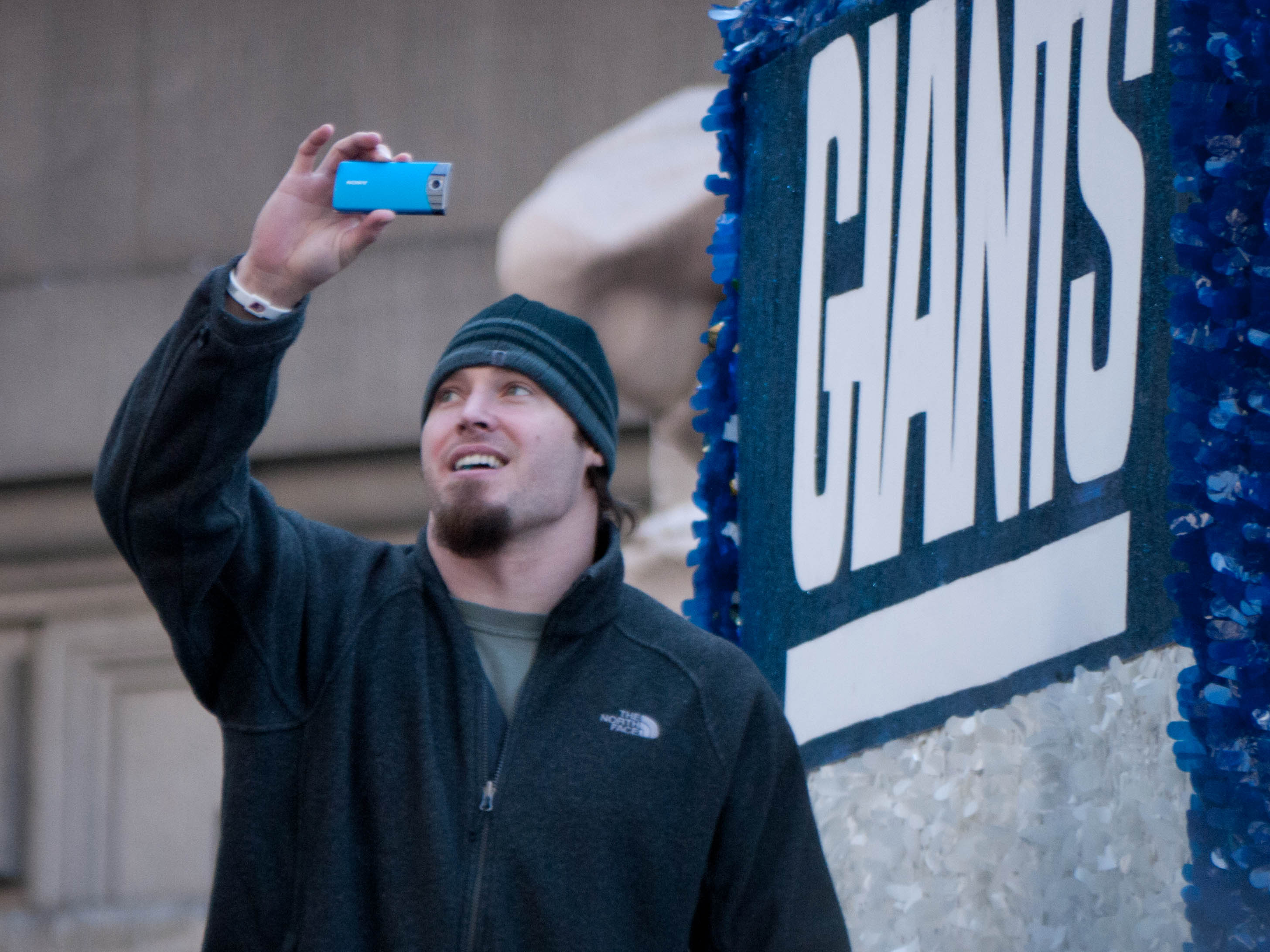
- Blackburn at a parade celebrating the Giants' victory in Super Bowl XLVI

Atlanta Falcons
- Title: Assistant special teams coach

Personal information
- Born: June 10, 1983 (age 43); Bellefontaine, Ohio, U.S.
- Listed height: 6 ft 3 in (1.91 m)
- Listed weight: 240 lb (109 kg)

Career information
- Position: Linebacker (No. 57, 93)
- High school: Marysville (OH)
- College: Akron
- NFL draft: 2005: undrafted

Career history

Playing
- New York Giants (2005–2012); Carolina Panthers (2013–2014)

Coaching
- Carolina Panthers (2016–2017) Assistant special teams coach; Carolina Panthers (2018–2021) Special teams coordinator; Tennessee Titans (2022) Assistant special teams coach; Los Angeles Rams (2023–2025) Special teams coordinator; Atlanta Falcons (2026–present) Assistant special teams coach

Awards and highlights
- 2× Super Bowl champion (XLII, XLVI); First-team All-MAC (2003)

Career NFL statistics
- Total tackles: 372
- Sacks: 4.5
- Forced fumbles: 6
- Fumble recoveries: 5
- Interceptions: 4
- Defensive touchdowns: 1
- Stats at Pro Football Reference

Chase Wyatt Blackburn (born June 10, 1983) is an American professional football coach and former player who is currently the assistant special teams coach for the Atlanta Falcons of the National Football League (NFL). He played as a linebacker in the NFL.

Blackburn played college football for the Akron Zips. He was signed by the New York Giants as an undrafted free agent in 2005. He won two Super Bowl titles with the Giants, both against the New England Patriots.

== Early life ==
Blackburn attended Marysville High School in Marysville, Ohio, and was a letterman in football and basketball. In football, as a senior, he led his team to a 13–1 record and the 2001 Ohio High School Football Division II State Seminifinals. He finished with 320 career tackles.

== College career ==
Blackburn was a three-year starter at the University of Akron, playing both linebacker and defensive end. He started 34 of 45 games in which he played and finished his college career with 293 tackles (179 solo), 11 sacks, 38.5 tackles for losses and three interceptions. He started all 11 games as a senior and finished with 71 tackles (41 solo), 5 sacks and 8.5 tackles for losses playing the "bandit" – a hybrid between the linebacker and defensive end positions. He was named All-MAC linebacker as a junior.

== Professional career ==
=== Pre-draft ===
Pre-draft measurables
Height	Weight	40-yard dash
6 ft 3 1/4 in (1.91 m)	245 lb (111 kg)	4.78 s
All values from Akron's Pro Day

=== New York Giants ===
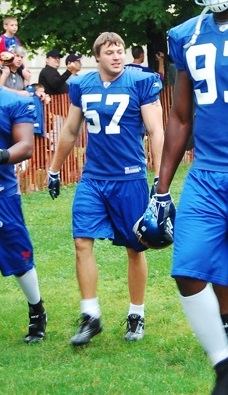
Blackburn at Giants training camp in 2007.

An undrafted rookie for the New York Giants in 2005, Blackburn spent most of the season as a backup linebacker and special teamer. In Week 16, against the Washington Redskins, he had a 31-yard interception return for a touchdown off of Mark Brunell in the 35–20 loss. He played in 15 games before going on injured reserve.

In Super Bowl XLII, Blackburn had a costly penalty on a punt return as he was the extra man on the field on a 12-man-on-the-field penalty. After the play, New England Patriots head coach Bill Belichick challenged the play that the Giants had 12 men on the field and won. The penalty resulted in a first down, but the Patriots did not score on that drive after a failed 4th down conversion. As a result, the Giants improved their field position by 20 yards, so the penalty actually benefited the team. The Giants went on to win the game 17–14.

For 2010, he was elected as a team captain by his teammates, representing special teams. After the season, he became an unrestricted free agent. He was re-signed on November 29, 2011. In Week 13 in a game against the Green Bay Packers, Blackburn recorded an interception against Aaron Rodgers in his own end. In the fourth quarter of Super Bowl XLVI, Blackburn recorded an interception against Patriots quarterback Tom Brady, the lone turnover of the game. On the interception, he won a one-on-one matchup with Rob Gronkowski. He had six tackles in the 21–17 win.

=== Carolina Panthers ===
Blackburn agreed to a two-year contract with the Carolina Panthers on March 27, 2013. Blackburn played a part in Carolina's defense in 2013, complementing Thomas Davis and Luke Kuechly with 33 tackles and 2 stuffs in the regular season and playoffs. On March 10, 2015, Blackburn became a free agent.

== NFL career statistics ==
Legend
**Bold**	Career high

=== Regular season ===
Year	Team	Games		Tackles					Interceptions					Fumbles			
Year	Team	GP	GS	Cmb	Solo	Ast	Sck	TFL	Int	Yds	TD	Lng	PD	FF	FR	Yds	TD
2005	NYG	15	2	31	21	10	0.0	0	**1**	**31**	**1**	**31**	1	0	1	0	0
2006	NYG	**16**	0	16	14	2	0.0	0	0	0	0	0	0	0	0	0	0
2007	NYG	**16**	0	22	20	2	0.0	0	0	0	0	0	0	0	1	0	0
2008	NYG	**16**	8	61	40	21	1.0	2	0	0	0	0	0	1	1	**12**	0
2009	NYG	**16**	7	60	37	23	0.5	4	**1**	24	0	24	1	0	0	0	0
2010	NYG	14	0	19	15	4	0.0	0	0	0	0	0	0	0	**2**	0	0
2011	NYG	5	4	26	20	6	0.0	1	**1**	9	0	9	2	0	0	0	0
2012	NYG	15	**15**	**98**	**64**	**34**	**3.0**	**6**	**1**	0	0	0	**5**	**4**	0	0	0
2013	CAR	13	7	27	18	9	0.0	1	0	0	0	0	1	0	0	0	0
2014	CAR	6	2	12	8	4	0.0	0	0	0	0	0	0	1	0	0	0
Career		132	45	372	257	115	4.5	14	4	64	1	31	10	6	5	12	0

=== Playoffs ===
Year	Team	Games		Tackles					Interceptions					Fumbles			
Year	Team	GP	GS	Cmb	Solo	Ast	Sck	TFL	Int	Yds	TD	Lng	PD	FF	FR	Yds	TD
2006	NYG	1	0	5	4	1	**1.0**	**1**	0	0	0	0	0	0	0	0	0
2007	NYG	**4**	0	5	3	2	0.0	0	0	0	0	0	0	0	0	0	0
2008	NYG	1	0	6	4	2	0.0	0	0	0	0	0	**1**	0	0	0	0
2011	NYG	**4**	**4**	**26**	**17**	**9**	0.0	**1**	**1**	0	0	0	**1**	0	**1**	**40**	0
2013	CAR	1	0	6	1	5	0.0	0	0	0	0	0	0	0	0	0	0
Career		11	4	48	29	19	1.0	2	1	0	0	0	2	0	1	40	0

== Coaching career ==
=== Carolina Panthers ===
During the off season before the 2016 season, Blackburn was brought in as a special teams coaching intern. On August 14, 2016, Blackburn was promoted to the special teams assistant to special teams coordinator Thomas McGaughey.

After the firing of former head coach, Ron Rivera, Blackburn was retained by the Panthers' new head coach, Matt Rhule. After the 2021 regular season ended, Rhule fired Blackburn from his coaching staff in January 2022.

=== Tennessee Titans ===
In March 2022, the Tennessee Titans announced the hiring of Blackburn as an assistant special teams coach.

=== Los Angeles Rams ===
On February 21, 2023, Blackburn was hired as a special teams coordinator by the Los Angeles Rams. He was fired by the Rams on December 20, 2025.

=== Atlanta Falcons ===
On February 10, 2026, Blackburn was hired by the Atlanta Falcons to serve as the team's assistant special teams coach. The move was first reported by NFL Media's Tom Pelissero and later covered by ProFootballTalk, which noted that Blackburn would join the staff under special teams coordinator Craig Aukerman.

== Personal life ==
Blackburn and his wife Megan have three sons, Landyn, Bentley, and Wyatt. He graduated from the University of Akron with a degree in mathematics. He lives in Weddington, North Carolina. Blackburn is a Christian.
