= Raymond, Ohio =

- CDP
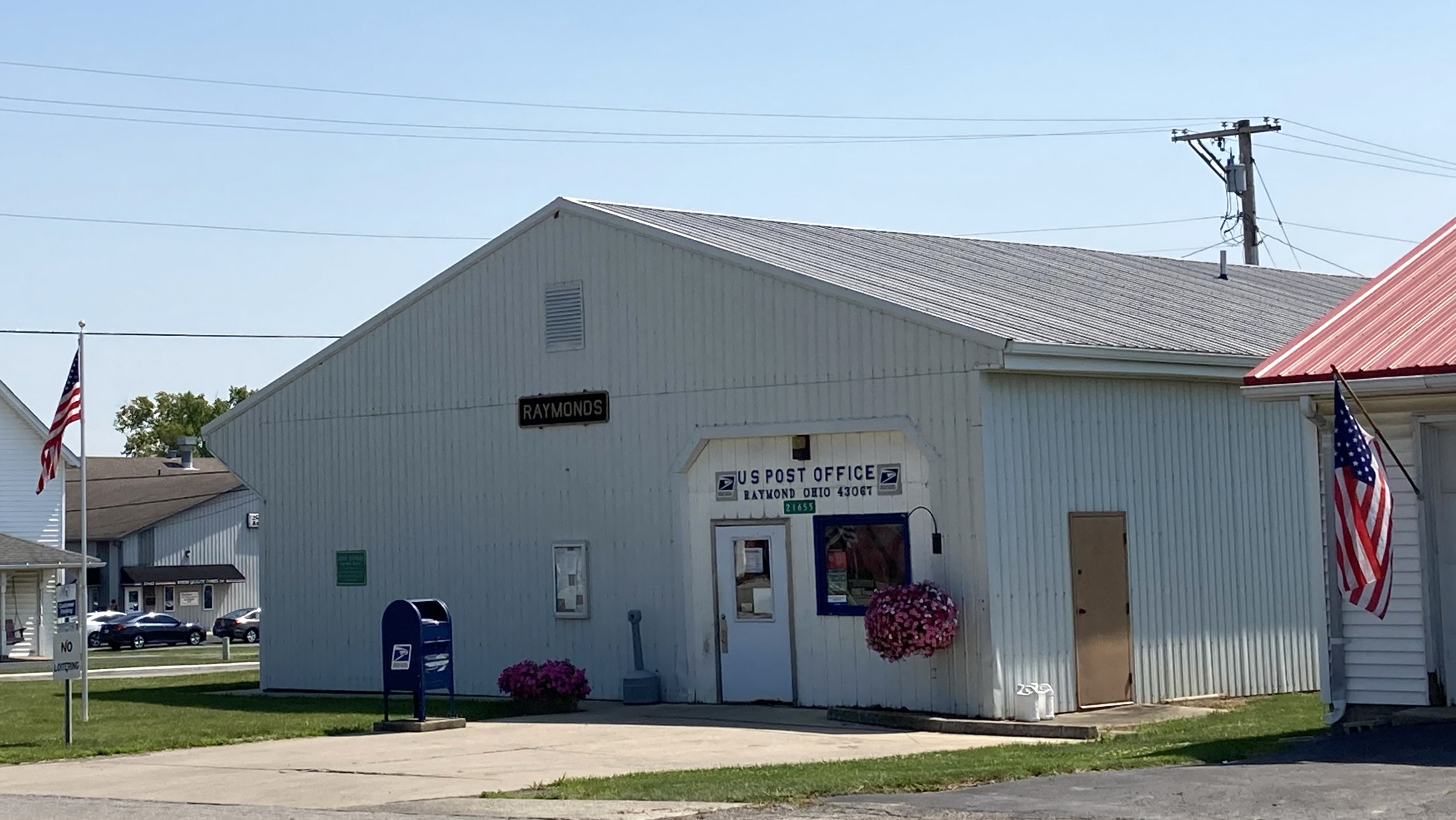
- US Post Office in Raymond

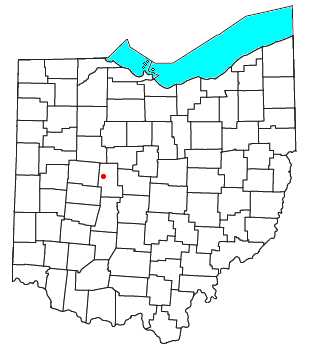
- Location of Raymond, Ohio
- Coordinates: 40°20′06″N 83°27′49″W
- Country: United States
- State: Ohio
- County: Union
- Township: Liberty
- Elevation: 1,070 ft (330 m)

Population (2020)
  - Total: 280
- Time zone: UTC-5 (Eastern (EST))
  - Summer (DST): UTC-4 (EDT)
- ZIP code: 43067
- GNIS feature ID: 2628957

Raymond is a census-designated place in eastern Liberty Township, Union County, Ohio, United States. It has a post office with the ZIP code 43067. It is located at the intersection of State Routes 347 and 739. The population was 280 at the 2020 census. Raymond is the unofficial administrative center of Liberty Township government; Raymond itself has no municipal framework or government of its own.

== History ==
The town was originally called Newton, and was laid out and platted in 1838. The Newton post office was opened in 1839, and three of the first six postmasters had the surname Raymond. Over time the settlement acquired the sobriquet "Raymond's post office." This was eventually shortened to "Raymond's P.O.," then to "Raymond's," then to "Raymonds," and finally to Raymond. The sign currently on the front of the Raymond post office is a representation of the signage that once adorned the Toledo & Ohio Central railroad station located on the south edge of the town.

== Education ==
Raymond is in the Marysville Exempted Village Schools District.

Raymond is home to Raymond Elementary School, part of the school district. The comprehensive high school of the district is Marysville High School.

Raymond also has a public library, a branch of the Marysville Public Library, which is open for six hours each Wednesday.
