= Dorothy Pelanda =

American politician

Director of the Ohio Department of Agriculture
- In office January 10, 2019 – December 31, 2022
- Governor: Mike DeWine
- Preceded by: David T. Daniels
- Succeeded by: Brian Baldridge

Member of the Ohio House of Representatives from the 86th district
- In office July 28, 2011 – January 6, 2019
- Preceded by: David Burke
- Succeeded by: Tracy Richardson

Personal details
- Born: Dorothy Liggett; March 1, 1956 (age 70) Marysville, Ohio, U.S.
- Party: Republican
- Spouse: Sam Gerhardstein
- Children: 3
- Education: Marysville High School
- Alma mater: Miami University; University of Akron
- Profession: Lawyer

Dorothy Liggett Pelanda (born March 1, 1956) is an American lawyer and former Director of the Ohio Department of Agriculture.

== Personal ==
Pelanda is married to Sam Gerhardstein, retired Governmental Affairs Director for Columbia Gas of Ohio. She has three children: Brian Pelanda, Doug Pelanda and Zoe Pelanda.

== Career ==
After graduating from the University of Akron School of Law, Pelanda returned to Marysville, Ohio where she began a career in law. She has 30 years experience in the legal profession in private practice specializing in family law. After her appointment to the Ohio House, Pelanda opted to devote her full energies to her legislative duties, and she closed her law office in late 2011.

Prior to her appointment to the Ohio House, Pelanda served two terms as president of both the Marysville Library Board and U-CO Industries in Union County. Pelanda established the Criminal Indigents of Union County in 2005, before the Union County Criminal Defense Lawyers assumed the work of representing indigent persons charged with felonies.

== Ohio House of Representatives ==
When Senator Karen Gillmor was appointed to the Industrial Commission of Ohio, it set off a chain of legislative appointments which saw Representative David Burke receive an appointment to the Ohio Senate to finish out Gillmor's term. Pelanda was appointed to finish Burke's unexpired term. Pelanda then opted to seek election to Burke's former seat in the Ohio House.

Pelanda ultimately was elected to succeed Burke. She was seated on July 28, 2011. During her House service from 2011 through 2018, Pelanda served on the following House committees: Agriculture, Commerce and Labor, Government Accountability and Oversight, Criminal Justice, Judiciary, and Rules and Reference.

Pelanda was elected to her second full term in 2014, and her third full term in 2016. During her service in the House, Pelanda was elected by her peers to serve as House Majority Whip, and later as House Majority Floor Leader, the third-ranking leadership position in the House.

In March 2017, Pelanda announced her candidacy for Ohio Secretary of State. Her campaign ended in October 2017.

== Ohio Department of Agriculture ==
On January 10, 2019, Gov. Mike DeWine announced that he was nominating Pelanda as Director of the Ohio Department of Agriculture. The nomination is subject to Senate confirmation. On January 14, 2019, Pelanda was sworn in as the first female Director of the Ohio Department of Agriculture.

== Electoral history ==
Election results
Year	Office	Election	Subject	Party	Votes	%	Opponent	Party	Votes	%
2012	Ohio House of Representatives	Primary	Dorothy Pelanda	Republican	9,020	100.00%				
2012	Ohio House of Representatives	General	Dorothy Pelanda	Republican	28,240	62.06%	Cheryl Johncox	Democratic	17,265	37.94%
2014	Ohio House of Representatives	Primary	Dorothy Pelanda	Republican	4,570	55.09%	Daniel Fogt	Republican	3,725	44.91%
2014	Ohio House of Representatives	General	Dorothy Pelanda	Republican	19,629	72.55%	John Babik	Democratic	7,426	27.45%
2016	Ohio House of Representatives	Primary	Dorothy Pelanda	Republican	16,040	100.00%				
2016	Ohio House of Representatives	General	Dorothy Pelanda	Republican	33,685	71.22%	Scott Crider	Democratic	13,611	28.78%
