= Union County Airport (Ohio) =

Public use airport in Marysville, Ohio

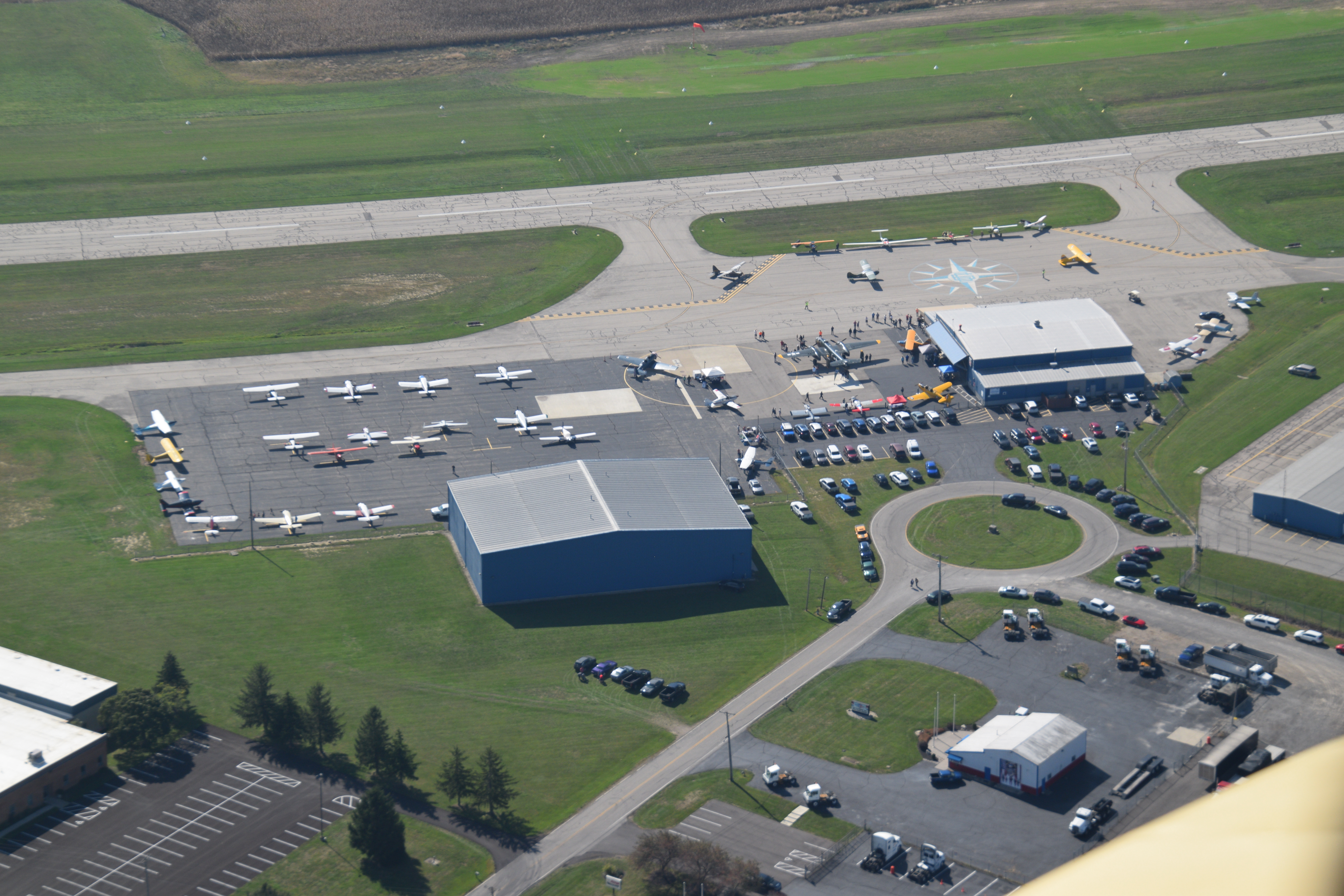
- An overhead shot of Marysville Airport during the 2024 Oktoberfest Fly-in
- IATA: none; ICAO: KMRT; FAA LID: MRT

Summary
- Airport type: Public
- Owner: Union County Airport Authority
- Serves: Marysville, Ohio
- Time zone: UTC−05:00 (-5)
  - Summer (DST): UTC−04:00 (-4)
- Elevation AMSL: 1,021 ft (311 m)
- Coordinates: 40°13′29″N 083°21′06″W

Map
- Location of airport in Ohio MRT (the United States)

Runways
Direction	Length		Surface
Direction	ft	m	Surface
9/27	4,218	1,286	Asphalt

Statistics (2012)
- Aircraft operations: 32,850
- Based aircraft: 57
- Source: Federal Aviation Administration

Union County Airport (ICAO: KMRT, FAA LID: MRT) (Note: The airport formerly used the FAA location identifier I78.) is a public use airport in Union County, Ohio, United States. It is owned by the Union County Airport Authority and located one nautical mile (2 km) southeast of the central business district of Marysville, Ohio. This airport is included in the National Plan of Integrated Airport Systems for 2011–2015, which categorized it as a general aviation facility.

Although most U.S. airports use the same three-letter location identifier for the FAA and IATA, this airport is assigned MRT by the FAA, but has no designation from the IATA (which assigned MRT to Moroak, Northern Territory, Australia).

== History ==
Planning for an airport in the area began in February 1962 and a site was selected in mid March 1966. In mid October 1966, a member of the airport authority resigned after expressing frustration with delays. However, within a week a contract for construction of the airport had been awarded. A contract for lighting was let in June 1967. Construction of the 4,000 ft (1,200 m) runway began in late August and the airport was dedicated on 8 October 1967. Construction of a 4,800 sq ft (450 m^{2}) hangar was approved in mid December 1968.

A new 15-unit t-hangar was opened in March 2026.

== Facilities and aircraft ==
=== Facilities ===
Union County Airport covers an area of 54 acres (22 ha) at an elevation of 1,021 feet (311 m) above mean sea level. It has two runways: runway 9/27 is paved with an asphalt surface and measures 4,218 by 75 feet (1,286 x 23 m); runway 8/26 is made of turf and measures 2702 x 81 ft (824 x 25 m).

The airport has a fixed-base operator that sells fuel and offers services such as general maintenance, hangaring, courtesy transportation, conference rooms, a crew lounge, and more.

In 2023, the airport received nearly $100,000 for its Airport Improvement Program. The money will be used to construct, modify, improve, or rehabilitate a hangar at the airport.

=== Aircraft ===
For the 12-month period ending June 5, 2023, the airport had 32,850 aircraft operations, an average of 90 per day: 90% general aviation, 8% military, and 2% air taxi. At that time there were 57 aircraft based at this airport: 55 airplanes, including 54 single-engine and 1 multi-engine; 1 jet; and 1 glider.

== Events ==
Sunday BBQs are held regularly at the Union County Airport.

There is a chapter of the experimental aircraft association at the airport. The chapter hosts a number of events, including Young Eagles airplane rides.

The airport is host to the annual All Ohio Balloon Festival, which showcases hot air balloons from around the world and their designs. The event hosts live music over three days. There are also booths for food and local vendors, skydiving displays, airplane rides, and animals for adoption.

The airport is home to a PT-26 wing sponsored by the Commemorative Air Force.

== Accidents and incidents ==
- On June 26, 2005, a Cessna 172M Skyhawk was substantially damaged during an aborted landing at Union County Airport. According to written and verbal statements provided by the pilot, after arriving in the vicinity of Marysville, he entered a right traffic pattern for runway 27, in order to avoid an aerobatic competition that was being held on the opposite side of the runway. While on the final leg of the traffic pattern, he extended the flaps to 20 degrees and reduced engine power. As he crossed the runway threshold, he leveled the airplane, and held that attitude for about 1,500 feet. He then flared for landing. As the airplane touched down, it "veered" to the right, and he attempted to compensate. The airplane then crossed over grass next to the runway, towards a crowd that was observing the aerobatic competition. The pilot attempted a go-around, but after adding full power, disengaging the carburetor heat, and increasing the airplane's pitch attitude, the right horizontal stabilizer came into contact with a taxiway sign. Assuming that the landing gear had made contact with the sign, the pilot continued his climb, which became uncontrollable, and the stall warning began to sound. The pilot declared an emergency and requested the aerobatics aircraft stopped their performance. Though he determined the elevator was jammed, the pilot controlled the altitude of the airplane by adding power to climb or by reducing power to descend. The probable cause of the accident was found to be the pilot's failure to maintain directional control during landing.
- On May 23, 2007, a Vans RV-7 crashed during a go-around attempt at the Union County airport. Witnesses report seeing the airplane coming in to 10-15 feet above the runway before pulling away; a farmer nearby saw the aircraft in a spiral dive. The probable cause of the accident was found to be the pilot's failure to maintain clearance from an object during a go-around and subsequent failure to maintain adequate airspeed. An airport sign and an inadvertent stall were factors.
- On August 14, 2008, a multiengine Beechcraft Baron crashed less than a mile from the airport. A line service technician at the airport observed the pilot, who was coming from a business meeting that ran long, loading bags into and inspecting the aircraft prior to departure. A flight instructor in another aircraft reported hearing a distress call from the Baron during his own takeoff roll, and he subsequently saw the accident airplane near the approach end of runway 9 in a 45-degree bank, with the nose pitched down about 15 degrees. The accident airplane overshot the extended runway centerline as it turned final. The airplane then "pitched up suddenly and rolled sharply to [the] left." The airplane rolled inverted and struck the ground. The probable cause of the accident was found to be the pilot's failure to maintain sufficient airspeed during the base to final turn, resulting in an aerodynamic stall.
- On June 21, 2009, a Cessna 172N Skyhawk was substantially damaged on landing at the Union County Airport. It veered off the runway, went across a taxiway, and came to rest in a grassy median. The pilot, who was practicing takeoffs and landings at the airport, reported that, on the second landing, the airplane veered to the right with the tires “skittering” during the landing roll. The pilot applied left rudder to no avail then “tapped” the left brake. The pilot reported the airplane straightened out then veered “hard” to the left, again with the tires “skittering.” The pilot applied right rudder, but the airplane continued off the left side of the runway. The plane struck a drainage culvert and overturned, coming to rest inverted. The probable cause of the accident was found to be the pilot's inability to maintain directional control of the airplane during the landing roll for undetermined reasons.
- On October 26, 2009, a Cessna 172 Skyhawk flown by a student pilot on a solo flight exited the left side of the runway and struck a grassy median while attempting to land at the Union County Airport. The pilot told law enforcement that he was landing in a crosswind which pushed the airplane to the left. The pilot further stated that he was unable to control the drift of the airplane and the left wheel entered the grass and pulled the airplane into the grass.The probable cause of the accident was found to be the student pilot's failure to maintain directional control during landing.
- On December 22, 2011, an aerobatic American Champion 8K Super Decathlon aircraft crashed just after takeoff from the Union County Airport. The pilot was performing a low-level snap and roll when it flew into the ground. The pilot was in the process of getting recertifying for aerobatic flight. The probable cause of the accident was found to be the pilot’s failure to maintain sufficient altitude from the terrain while performing low-level aerobatics.
- On July 16, 2012, a Flight Design Gmbh model CTLS sustained minor damage during a runway excursion on takeoff at Union County Airport. The solo instructional flight had proceeded from the Ohio State University Airport to the Union County Airport to practice landings. During his first takeoff roll at Union County, the pilot reported feeling a "jolt" and hearing a "thumping" sound from the left main wheel. The airplane immediately veered to the left and departed the runway pavement. A postincident examination revealed that outer half of the left main wheel assembly had failed. The probable cause of the accident was found to be fatigue failure of the left main wheel assembly on takeoff, which resulted in a loss of directional control and runway excursion.
- On February 9, 2013, an aircraft blew a tire after landing at the Union County Airport.
- On June 30, 2016, a Quad City Challenger II CW experimental amateur-built airplane was substantially damaged during a forced landing following a total loss of engine power during initial climb at Union County Airport. The pilot reported that the engine lost all power during the initial climb. Since the airplane was still over the runway and the winds were calm, the pilot made a left turn in an attempt to land on a grass runway parallel to the departure runway. The reason for the total loss of power could not be determined.
- On April 11, 2019, a Cessna 182 Skylane flipped inverted while landing at the Union County Airport.
- On September 1, 2022, an Aeronca 7AC Champion ground looped while landing that the Union County Airport.
- On February 13, 2023, there was an active shooter situation at the airport. It was revealed that the suspect was taking target practice at the airport by shooting cans and bottles.

== See also ==
- List of airports in Ohio
