= Kihachi =

- Gender: Male

Origin
- Origin: Japanese
- Meaning: Different meanings depending on the kanji used

Kihachi (written: 喜八) is a masculine Japanese given name. Notable people with the name include:

- Kihachi Okamoto (岡本 喜八; 1924–2005), Japanese film director
- Ozaki Kihachi (尾崎 喜八; 1892–1974), Japanese poet
