= Columbus Japanese Language School =

School in Worthington, Ohio, United States

- School logo

Location
- Office location: 450 W Wilson Bridge Rd # 360; OfficeScapes Corporate Center; Columbus, Ohio metropolitan area Worthington, Franklin County, Ohio 43085; United States; 40.11141°N 83.02717°W

Information
- School type: Hoshū jugyō kō
- Established: 1979
- President: Mr. Masaomi Kataiki
- Principal: Mr. Hiroetsu Takahashi
- Enrollment: 550
- Language: Japanese
- Schedule: Saturday
- Website: columbushoshuko.com/wordpress1/

Columbus Japanese Language School (コロンバス日本語補習校, Koronbasu Nihongo Hoshūkō; CJLS) is a weekend supplementary Japanese school, based in the Columbus, Ohio metropolitan area.

The classes are held in Creekview Intermediate School, of the Marysville Exempted Village Schools District (MEVSD) in Marysville. The school office is located in Worthington.

== History ==
The school was established in 1979 in a private house. A basement was used as the first classroom. Area Japanese parents formally opened the school in April 1980, then only having elementary level classes, and the school started with three teachers and fourteen students. By 1989, the student count was 400.

It began renting from Worthington Estates Elementary School and Worthingway Middle School, both in Worthington, for elementary and secondary level classes, respectively, in April 1999. It began renting from Grandby Elementary School and McCord Middle School for elementary and secondary classes, respectively, in April 2003; both schools are in the city limits of Columbus.

As of 2013, the school has 37 employees and 555 students. The Japanese Ministry of Education, Culture, Sports, Science and Technology (MEXT) sent two of the employees to the school. As of 2014 there were about 550 students.

In March 2019, the hoshuko stopped the Worthington school rents due to the state of the contracts. From March 2020 the Japanese school was to rent space in Glacier Ridge Elementary School, in Dublin, of Dublin City Schools. From September 2021 the hoshuko began using a Marysville facility. Prior to the Marysville agreement, the Japanese school had done learning over the Internet.

== Operations ==
The school holds its classes on Saturdays with 17 board members managing the school.

== See also ==
- Japanese community of Columbus, Ohio
- Japanese language education in the United States
