= Marysville Exempted Village Schools District =

School district in Ohio, United States

Marysville Exempted Village School District

Address
- 212 Chestnut Maryville, Ohio, 43040; United States

District information
- Type: Public
- Grades: K-12
- Superintendent: Diane Allen
- School board: Sue Devine - President, Nan Savage -Vice President, Bill Keck, Dick Smith, Jermaine Ferguson
- Budget: $58,668,469(2008), $74,769,564(2021)
- NCES District ID: 3904547

Students and staff
- Enrollment: 5,243(PPS: $9,625), 5,403(2021)
- Staff: 300+(ATS: $54,307)
- Student–teacher ratio: 17.7(2008-2009)
- Athletic conference: Ohio Capital Conference
- District mascot: Lion
- Colors: Red/Blue

Other information
- Website: www.marysville.k12.oh.us

Marysville Exempted Village Schools District is a public school district in Marysville, Ohio.

Marysville Schools, is a growing school district located about 20 miles Northwest of Columbus, Ohio. The district has over 5,400 students consisting of five elementary schools (K-4), one intermediate school (5-6), one middle school (7-8), one high school (9-12), and one STEM early college high school (9-12). Our schools employ over 300 teachers and 200 support staff, such as maintenance, custodians, secretaries, aides, food service personnel, bus drivers, School Age Child Care (SACC), etc.

== Area ==
The district includes almost all of the land territory of Marysville, as well as the census-designated place of Raymond. The district has all of Liberty Township, majorities of Allen, Dover, Paris, and Taylor townships, and portions of Leesburg, and York townships.

== Operations ==
Marysville Exempted Village Schools operates 5 elementary schools, 1 intermediate school, 1 middle school and 3 high schools. The Columbus Japanese Language School, a weekend school for Japanese people, holds its classes at Creekview Intermediate School and did so since September 2021. The school office is in Worthington.

== Schools ==
Marysville has 5 elementary schools which education children from Kindergarten through Fourth grade. The schools are Raymond Elementary, Edgewood Elementary, Mill Valley Elementary, Navin Elementary and Northwood Elementary.

Students in grades Five and Six are taught at Creekview Intermediate.

Bunsold Middle school was built to educate Marysville Exempted Village School Districts students in Seventh and Eighth grades.

Marysville High School was opened in the 1990s, with recent additions made.

The Early College High School was opened in August 2014 in the former High School which was closed in 1990 when the new high school was constructed. The Early College High School, "ECHS" or "STEM", students can choose Engineering, Integrated Technologies, and Health Science as career paths.

Marysville Schools has operated Tri Academy High School since 2017 to better support at risk high school students. TRI Academy is a highly supported learning community for students who would benefit from an individualized approach to stay on track for graduation. TRI Academy is in place, first and foremost, to provide students with Tailored Relevant Instruction designed specifically to meet their needs. Students will have personalized opportunities to maximize their credit earning potential, which helps promote their progress toward graduation at faster rates than in a traditional classroom setting. Students will partner with their teachers to participate in blended courses and relevant experiences that tap into students’ talents and prepare them to achieve their future goals. The high school as graduated 64 students who otherwise may not have earned a high school diploma in the traditional high school. The Board of Education announced in May 2023 that the Tri Academy High School would close at the end of the 2023 school year due to the recent levy failure.

== Mascot ==
The school district's mascot is the “Monarch,” usually portrayed by a lion. Both the Middle and High Schools have wrestling, football, basketball, baseball, softball, lacrosse, track and field, volleyball, and golf teams, and marching band. Other student activities include Art and Writing clubs, Student Councils, Swim Team, FFA, “In the Know,” Choir (and Show Choir), a Bowling Team, among many others. The wrestling team has won six league championships, and producing three state champions.
