= Marysville, Ohio =

- City
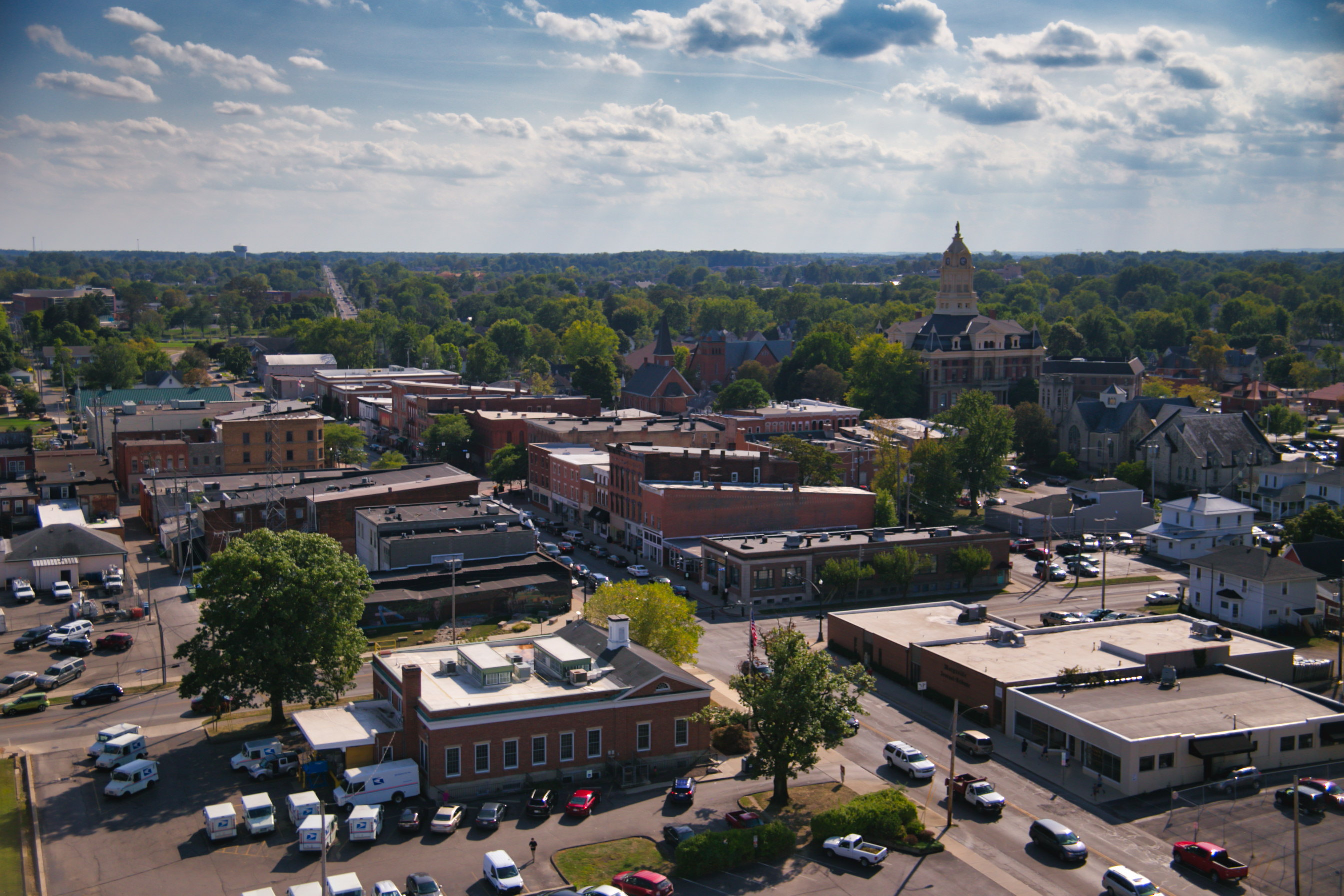
- Marysville, Ohio as viewed from atop the Historic Uptown grain silo

- Flag Logo
- Nickname: The Shaded City
- Interactive map of Marysville, Ohio
- Location within Ohio Location within the United States
- Coordinates: 40°14′32″N 83°22′25″W
- Country: United States
- State: Ohio
- County: Union

Government
  - Type: Council-City Manager
  - Mayor / President of Council: Scott Hunter

Area
  - City: 16.57 sq mi (42.91 km^{2})
  - Land: 16.28 sq mi (42.16 km^{2})
  - Water: 0.29 sq mi (0.75 km^{2})
- Elevation: 1,001 ft (305 m)

Population (2020)
  - City: 25,571
  - Density: 1,571.0/sq mi (606.55/km^{2})
  - Urban: 22,094
- Time zone: UTC-5 (EST)
  - Summer (DST): UTC-4 (EDT)
- ZIP codes: 43040-43041
- Area codes: 937, 326
- FIPS code: 39-48160
- GNIS feature ID: 2395035
- Website: marysvilleohio.org

Marysville is a city in Union County, Ohio, United States, and its county seat. The population was 25,571 at the 2020 census. It is a suburb approximately 27 miles (43 km) northwest of Columbus. Marysville's longtime slogan is "Where the Grass is Greener". In 2008, the city was designated as a "Preserve America Community" by U.S. First Lady Laura Bush.

== History ==
=== Origins ===
Marysville was originally part of Northwest Territory, and then became part of the Virginia Military District within that territory, and eventually became part of the state of Ohio. One of the original surveyors of the area was James Galloway, Jr., who first visited in 1805. Marysville was founded in 1819 by Samuel W. Culbertson, who named the town after his daughter Mary, along the small waterway of Mill Creek.

=== County seat designation ===
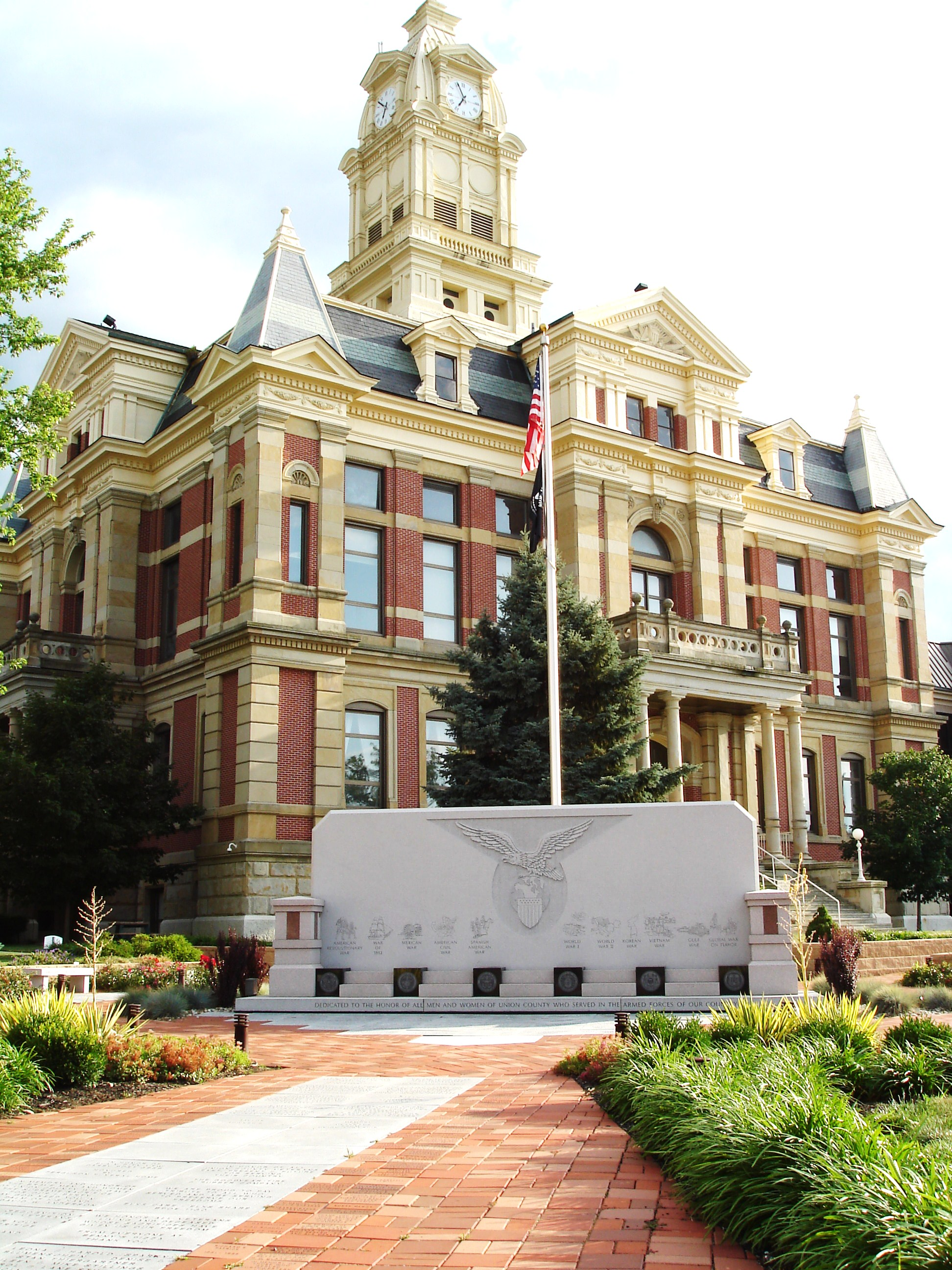
Union County Courthouse

After the organization of the county by the Ohio Legislature, Marysville was designated as the seat of Union County. The first recorded meeting of the commissioners was in 1820. Between 1835 and 1840, a courthouse was constructed. Eventually, a new dedicated courthouse would be built in Marysville on January 27, 1883, which is also presently in use.

In 1849, a county infirmary was authorized. The first county jail was a log structure that sat on the south side of East Center street, in the rear of the courthouse. Eventually a new jail was authorized by the commissioners and built in the 1870s. In 1878 the county purchased a 10-ton safe for the treasury, that eventually was moved into courthouse.

The first county fair was held in 1847 in Marysville, in the public square. In 1852, the Agriculture Society moved the fair to the current location, on the north side of town.

=== Early development ===
Marysville was originally laid out in 1820. The first permanent settlement was made by Abraham Amrine, of Swiss descent, in 1817, two miles north of the city. Today the main road leading to the high school is named Amrine-Mill Rd. Amrine was an American Revolution veteran, having served in the Continental Army as a ranger.

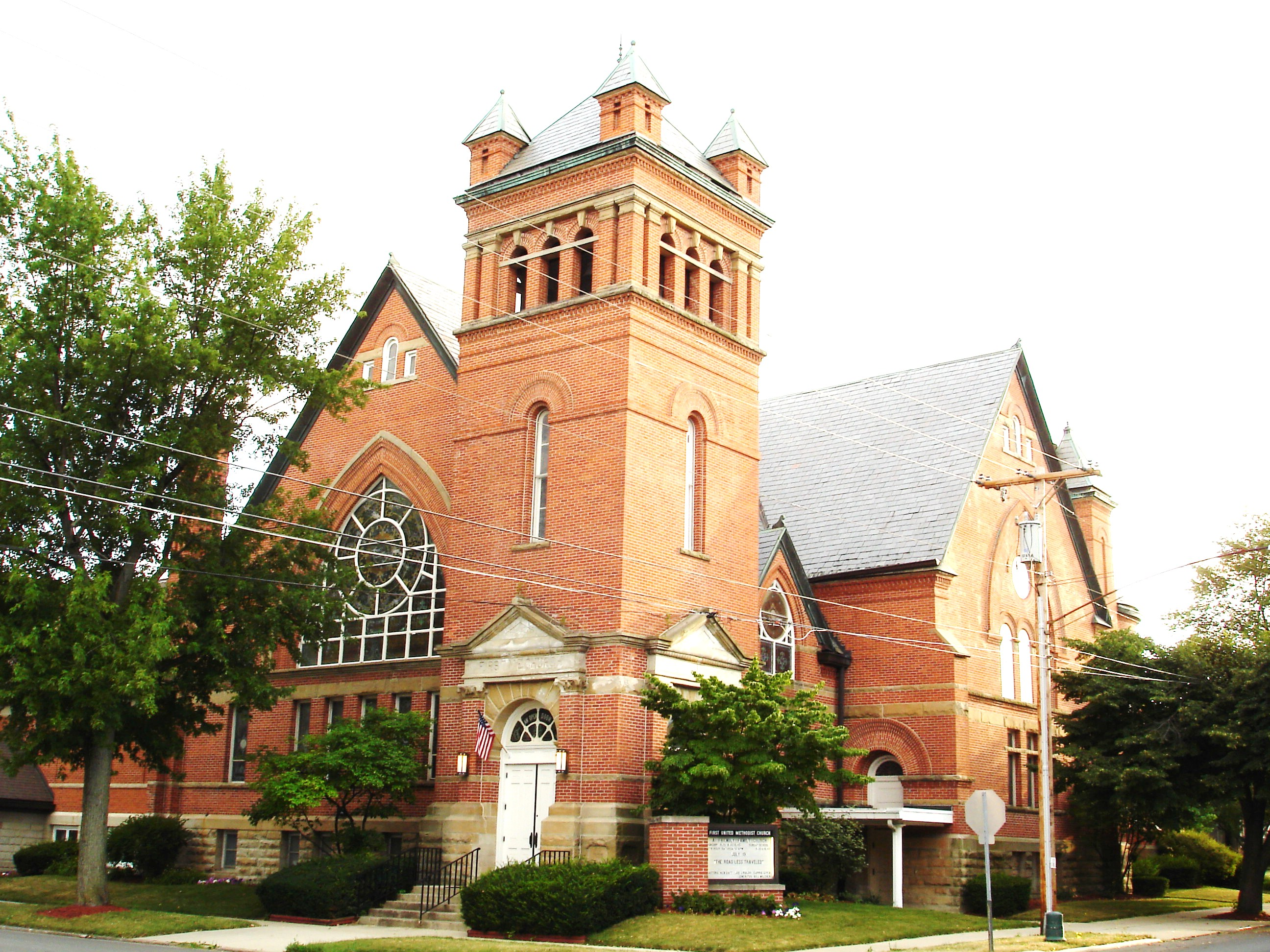
First United Methodist Church

In 1824, the first post office was established. At this time, there were only four families in the village. In 1828, Marysville's first school was established in the east side of town using a log cabin as its building structure. By 1839, there were already three schools operating in the town. In 1843, the first high school was opened by Caroline Humphrey, and by 1850 there was a Board of Education making annual reports to the voters.

In 1837, the Ohio Gazetteer published that Marysville was a small post town consisting of a court house, a jail, forty-five dwelling houses, one tavern, three stores, one practicing physician, two attorneys and about 250 inhabitants. By 1846, Marysville had 360 inhabitants, three small dry goods stores, two churches (Presbyterian and Methodist), a private school, and a newspaper office.

Early Marysville businesses during this period included McClouds Drug Store on the south side of the square, the Cheap Cash Store, the American Hotel, the W.W. Woods store, and Hare and Hughes, a hat business located on the southwest corner of the square. Several locals ran personal unnamed businesses. The village was incorporated in 1840, with Otway Curry elected as the first mayor.

Ladders were first purchased for a fire department in 1845, and by 1865 the village had purchased its first fire engine. The commissioners petitioned for a fire house, but it would not be built until 1906 (a two-level brick building).

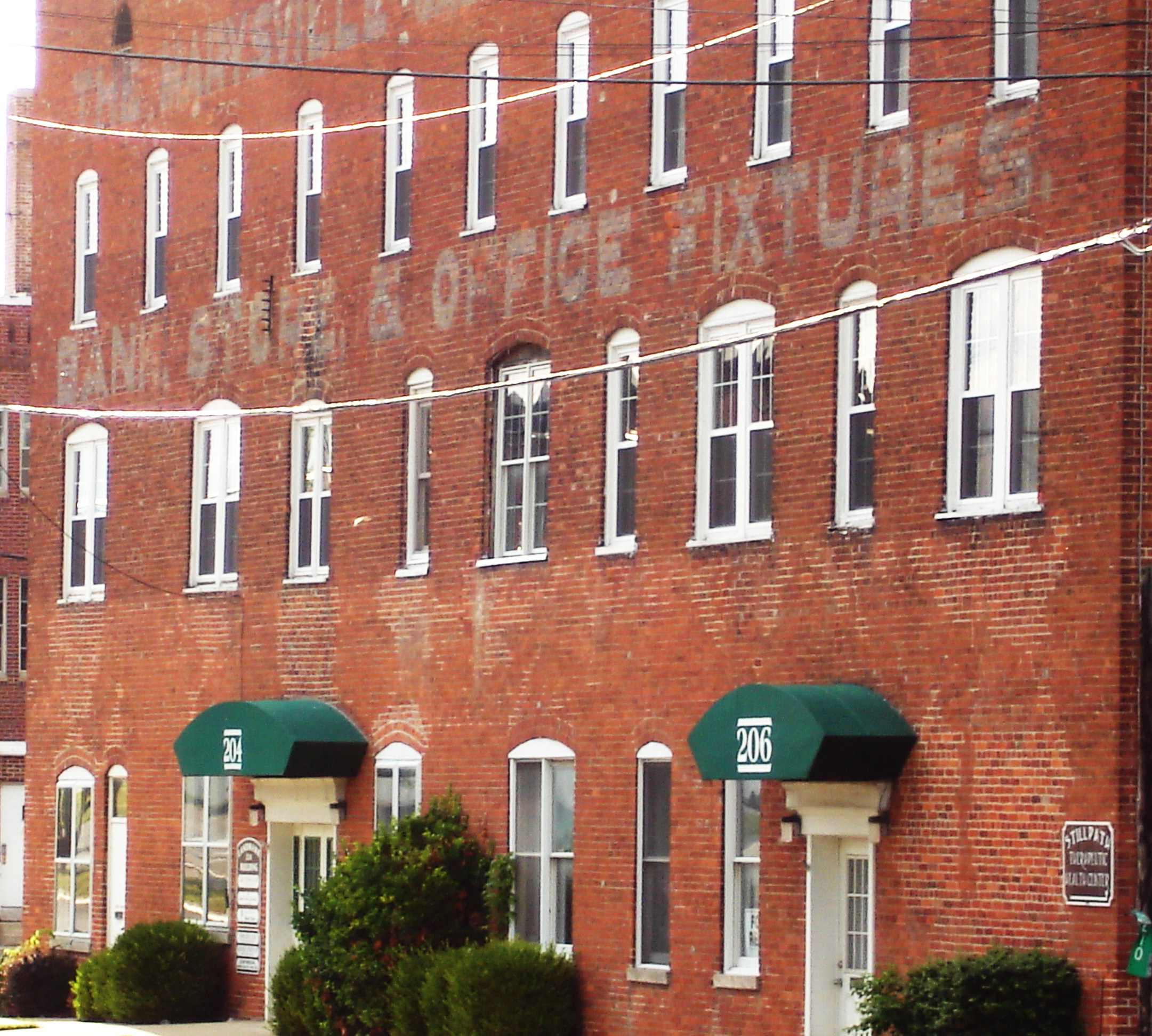
Landmark building

A census in 1859 showed that the village had 981 residents. By 1865, Marysville had six dry goods stores, one hardware store, nine or ten groceries, a mill, a woolen factory, and most of the trades and professions. It was growing steadily by this point.

In 1877, the town council decided to build a city hall on the southeast corner of Main and South. It would be completed in 1878, and house the council rooms, public library, fire department rooms, and city prison. An opera house would be constructed as well. In 1877, a fine building was erected on the eastside of town for education. It had ten rooms for educational purposes, other rooms for various purposes, and an exhibition hall on the upper floor. The Agassiz Scientific, Archaeological and Historical Society of Marysville was organized in 1879, and placed in the East school building, their museum was also placed in the same building.

By 1888, Marysville had earned itself the title of "the Shaded City" because of its tree-lined streets, and by 1890, its population increased to 2,832 residents.

=== Early manufacturing and banking ===
Marysville's industrial roots can be traced back to many early companies. Among those were the Marysville Pearlash Factory, an ashery founded in 1848, which by 1874 was the largest in the United States. The first steam-grist mill was erected in 1856 by Saxton and Casil. In 1867, Miller & Snodgrass constructed a flour mill. In 1874, Marysville Butter Tub and Spoke Company was incorporated with $50,000.

A wool company, Woodbury & Welsh, constructed a factory out of brick in the northeast part of town in 1864, and a brewery was built in 1866 on the east side. In 1868, O.M. Scotts and Company was organized. In 1871, the Marysville Cheese Manufacturing Company was built on the east side. Many carriage manufacturing companies operated in Marysville, including Bauer, Schepper & Devine in 1882, City Carriage Works in 1871, and L. E. Helium in 1874.

In 1875, Rice, Fleck & Co. opened a lumberyard. The Marysville Gas Light Company was incorporated in 1878 following almost a decade of the city using kerosene for lighting. The Bank of Marysville was opened in 1854, the Farmer's Bank of Union County in 1868, located on the southeast corner of the square, and the People's Bank in 1874.

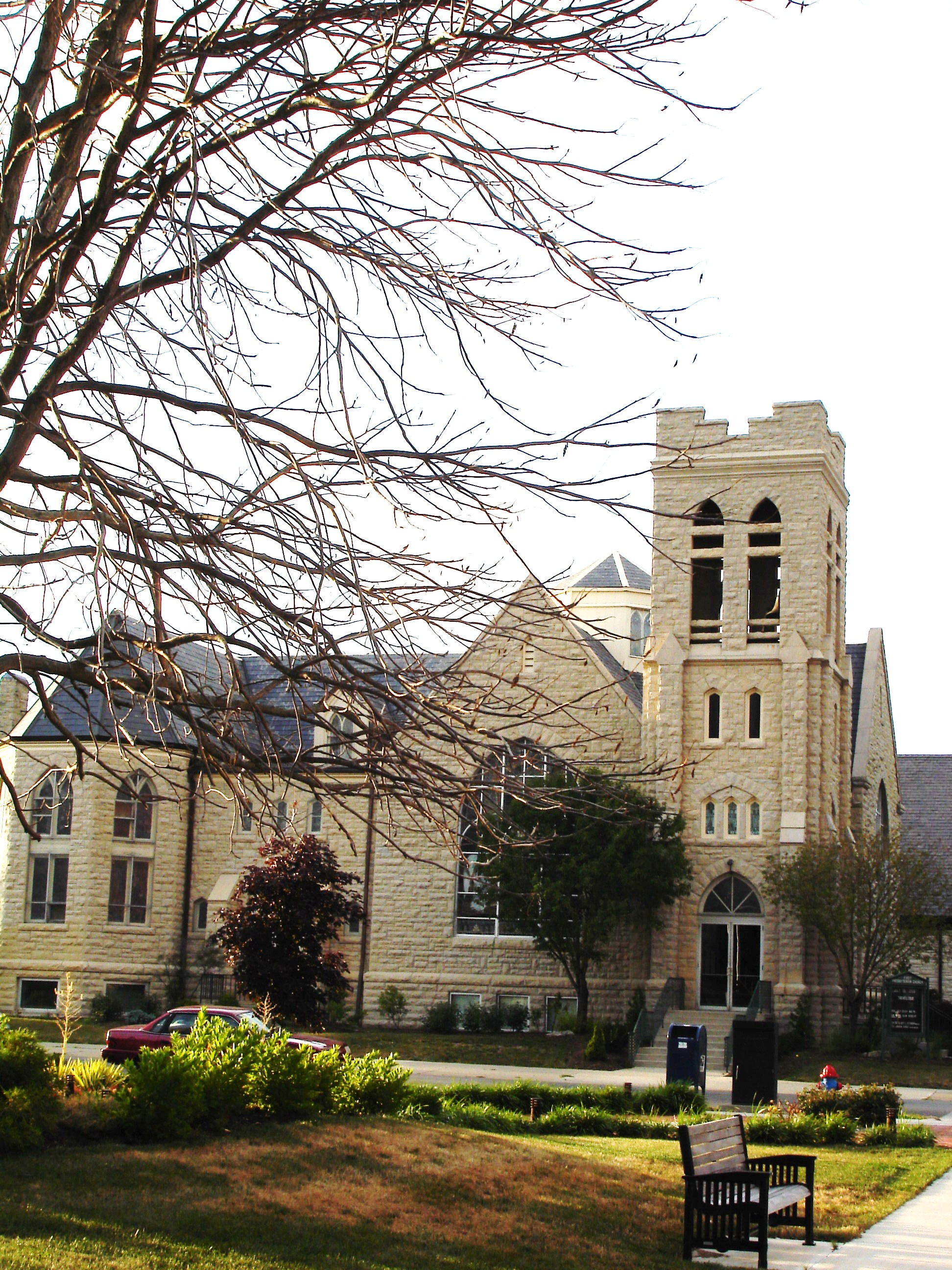
Presbyterian Church

=== Early culture ===
In 1827, the Methodist Episcopal Church was organized. In 1856, the church dedicated a new building on East Center street. The first Fourth of July celebrations were held in 1828.

In 1840, Otway Curry, a poet of national fame and resident of Marysville, wrote the "Log Cabin Song". It would inspire the Log Cabin Campaign of William Henry Harrison, who would go on to win the Presidential election that year.

The Presbyterian Church was organized in the house of Stephen McClain on September 9, 1829. In 1866, a movement was started to construct a new church building; a new building was finally dedicated in 1870, located at the corner of Center and West Streets. The Congregational Church organized in 1864, with a building constructed on the northeast corner of West and South Street.

The Church of Our Lady of Lourdes, a Roman Catholic Church, was constructed in 1866 at Water Street near the railroad station. The German Lutheran Church organized in 1875, also operating their own school.

=== Modern development ===
Over the next century, Marysville's population would double from its 1890 census. A new high school was built in the West neighborhood behind the courthouse, which would then become a middle school later when a new high school would be built on the north side. The most recent high school went up in the 1990s. At that time, the old high school became the new middle school, and the old middle school became county offices.

In 1948, Nestlé opened a research and development center in the West neighborhood. A new city hall would be constructed on the southeast side of Uptown, which housed the police department. Memorial Hospital of Union County located in the Medical district in 1952. Many other developments took place during this time, including the construction of the Union County Airport on the east side in 1967, as well as numerous manufacturing companies and small housing developments being constructed throughout the city. Timberview, an upscale residential section on the south side, would be constructed, and included a golf course. Greenwood Colony would also be built on the south side.

In 1977, Honda announced plans to construct a motorcycle assembly plant near Marysville and eventually opened manufacturing plants northwest of the town in 1982. This caused the expansion of U.S. Route 33.

U.S. President George H. W. Bush visited on 26 September 1992 as part of his "whistle stop train tour" re-election campaign. Present on the train were U.S. Congressmen Chalmers Wylie, Paul Gillmor, and John Kasich; future-U.S. Senator Mike Dewine, and Ohio Governor George Voinovich. Bush remarked around Marysville they're known to wear buttons which say "Reelect Barbara Bush's husband", because his wife Barbara had family roots in the city and was known to visit. Bush's opponent, U.S. Presidential candidate Bill Clinton, had supporters who disrupted the campaign stop.

== Geography ==
According to the United States Census Bureau, the city has a total area of 16.56 square miles (42.89 km^{2}), of which 16.27 square miles (42.14 km^{2}) is land and 0.29 square miles (0.75 km^{2}) is water.

=== Climate ===
Climate data for Marysville, Ohio (1991–2020 normals, extremes 1917–present)
Month	Jan	Feb	Mar	Apr	May	Jun	Jul	Aug	Sep	Oct	Nov	Dec	Year
Record high °F (°C)	72 (22)	75 (24)	85 (29)	89 (32)	95 (35)	101 (38)	109 (43)	105 (41)	102 (39)	92 (33)	80 (27)	74 (23)	109 (43)
Mean maximum °F (°C)	57.7 (14.3)	61.6 (16.4)	71.6 (22.0)	81.1 (27.3)	88.4 (31.3)	93.0 (33.9)	93.2 (34.0)	92.2 (33.4)	90.3 (32.4)	82.7 (28.2)	68.9 (20.5)	60.5 (15.8)	94.5 (34.7)
Mean daily maximum °F (°C)	35.0 (1.7)	38.9 (3.8)	49.6 (9.8)	63.0 (17.2)	73.6 (23.1)	81.7 (27.6)	84.9 (29.4)	83.5 (28.6)	77.5 (25.3)	65.0 (18.3)	50.9 (10.5)	39.6 (4.2)	61.9 (16.6)
Daily mean °F (°C)	27.8 (−2.3)	30.9 (−0.6)	40.2 (4.6)	52.0 (11.1)	62.7 (17.1)	71.2 (21.8)	74.7 (23.7)	73.0 (22.8)	66.1 (18.9)	54.4 (12.4)	42.3 (5.7)	32.9 (0.5)	52.3 (11.3)
Mean daily minimum °F (°C)	20.6 (−6.3)	22.9 (−5.1)	30.8 (−0.7)	41.0 (5.0)	51.8 (11.0)	60.8 (16.0)	64.4 (18.0)	62.4 (16.9)	54.7 (12.6)	43.8 (6.6)	33.7 (0.9)	26.1 (−3.3)	42.7 (5.9)
Mean minimum °F (°C)	0.4 (−17.6)	4.4 (−15.3)	13.3 (−10.4)	26.2 (−3.2)	38.3 (3.5)	47.3 (8.5)	53.1 (11.7)	50.9 (10.5)	41.0 (5.0)	30.7 (−0.7)	20.1 (−6.6)	10.0 (−12.2)	−3.0 (−19.4)
Record low °F (°C)	−23 (−31)	−19 (−28)	−11 (−24)	8 (−13)	22 (−6)	36 (2)	42 (6)	36 (2)	27 (−3)	12 (−11)	−6 (−21)	−20 (−29)	−23 (−31)
Average precipitation inches (mm)	2.68 (68)	2.29 (58)	3.02 (77)	3.86 (98)	4.52 (115)	4.85 (123)	4.15 (105)	3.41 (87)	3.20 (81)	2.72 (69)	2.90 (74)	2.88 (73)	40.48 (1,028)
Average snowfall inches (cm)	7.0 (18)	6.6 (17)	4.1 (10)	0.1 (0.25)	0.0 (0.0)	0.0 (0.0)	0.0 (0.0)	0.0 (0.0)	0.0 (0.0)	0.0 (0.0)	0.7 (1.8)	5.5 (14)	24.0 (61)
Average precipitation days (≥ 0.01 in)	11.1	10.0	10.8	12.1	13.6	11.7	10.3	8.7	8.8	8.9	9.5	10.9	126.4
Average snowy days (≥ 0.1 in)	6.1	4.3	2.2	0.2	0.0	0.0	0.0	0.0	0.0	0.0	0.8	3.6	17.5
Source: NOAA

== Demographics ==
Historical population
Census	Pop.	Note	%±
1840	360		—
1850	605		68.1%
1860	849		40.3%
1870	1,441		69.7%
1880	2,061		43.0%
1890	2,810		36.3%
1900	3,048		8.5%
1910	3,576		17.3%
1920	3,035		−15.1%
1930	3,639		19.9%
1940	4,037		10.9%
1950	4,256		5.4%
1960	4,952		16.4%
1970	5,744		16.0%
1980	7,403		28.9%
1990	9,656		30.4%
2000	15,942		65.1%
2010	22,094		38.6%
2020	25,571		15.7%

=== 2020 census ===
As of the 2020 census, Marysville had a population of 25,571. The median age was 35.5 years. 23.9% of residents were under the age of 18 and 11.5% of residents were 65 years of age or older. For every 100 females there were 79.3 males, and for every 100 females age 18 and over there were 73.4 males age 18 and over.

96.8% of residents lived in urban areas, while 3.2% lived in rural areas.

There were 8,783 households in Marysville, of which 37.1% had children under the age of 18 living in them. Of all households, 53.1% were married-couple households, 16.4% were households with a male householder and no spouse or partner present, and 23.4% were households with a female householder and no spouse or partner present. About 25.0% of all households were made up of individuals and 9.2% had someone living alone who was 65 years of age or older.

There were 9,327 housing units, of which 5.8% were vacant. The homeowner vacancy rate was 1.1% and the rental vacancy rate was 7.8%.

Racial composition as of the 2020 census
Race	Number	Percent
White	21,861	85.5%
Black or African American	968	3.8%
American Indian and Alaska Native	52	0.2%
Asian	998	3.9%
Native Hawaiian and Other Pacific Islander	0	0.0%
Some other race	298	1.2%
Two or more races	1,394	5.5%
Hispanic or Latino (of any race)	833	3.3%

=== 2010 census ===
The median price for a home in Marysville was $168,100 according to Census 2010.

As of the 2010 census, there were 22,094 people, 7,314 households, and 5,050 families residing in the city. The population density was 1,358.0 inhabitants per square mile (524.3/km^{2}). There were 7,969 housing units at an average density of 489.8 per square mile (189.1/km^{2}). The racial makeup of the city was 90.4% White, 4.5% African American, 0.3% Native American, 2.3% Asian, 0.1% Pacific Islander, 0.6% from other races, and 1.8% from two or more races. Hispanic or Latino of any race were 1.8% of the population.

There were 7,314 households, of which 41.7% had children under the age of 18 living with them, 53.1% were married couples living together, 11.6% had a female householder with no husband present, 4.4% had a male householder with no wife present, and 31.0% were non-families. 25.2% of all households were made up of individuals, and 8.1% had someone living alone who was 65 years of age or older. The average household size was 2.62 and the average family size was 3.16.

The median age in the city was 33.1 years. 26.6% of residents were under the age of 18; 8.6% were between the ages of 18 and 24; 36.1% were from 25 to 44; 20.7% were from 45 to 64; and 8.1% were 65 years of age or older. The gender makeup of the city was 42.8% male and 57.2% female.

=== 2000 census ===
As of the 2000 census the median income for a household in the city was $55,671. Males had a median income of $40,973 versus $27,427 for females. The per capita income for the city was $22,812. About 4.0% of families and 5.7% of the population were below the poverty line, including 5.3% of those under age 18 and 9.4% of those age 65 or over.

== Economy ==
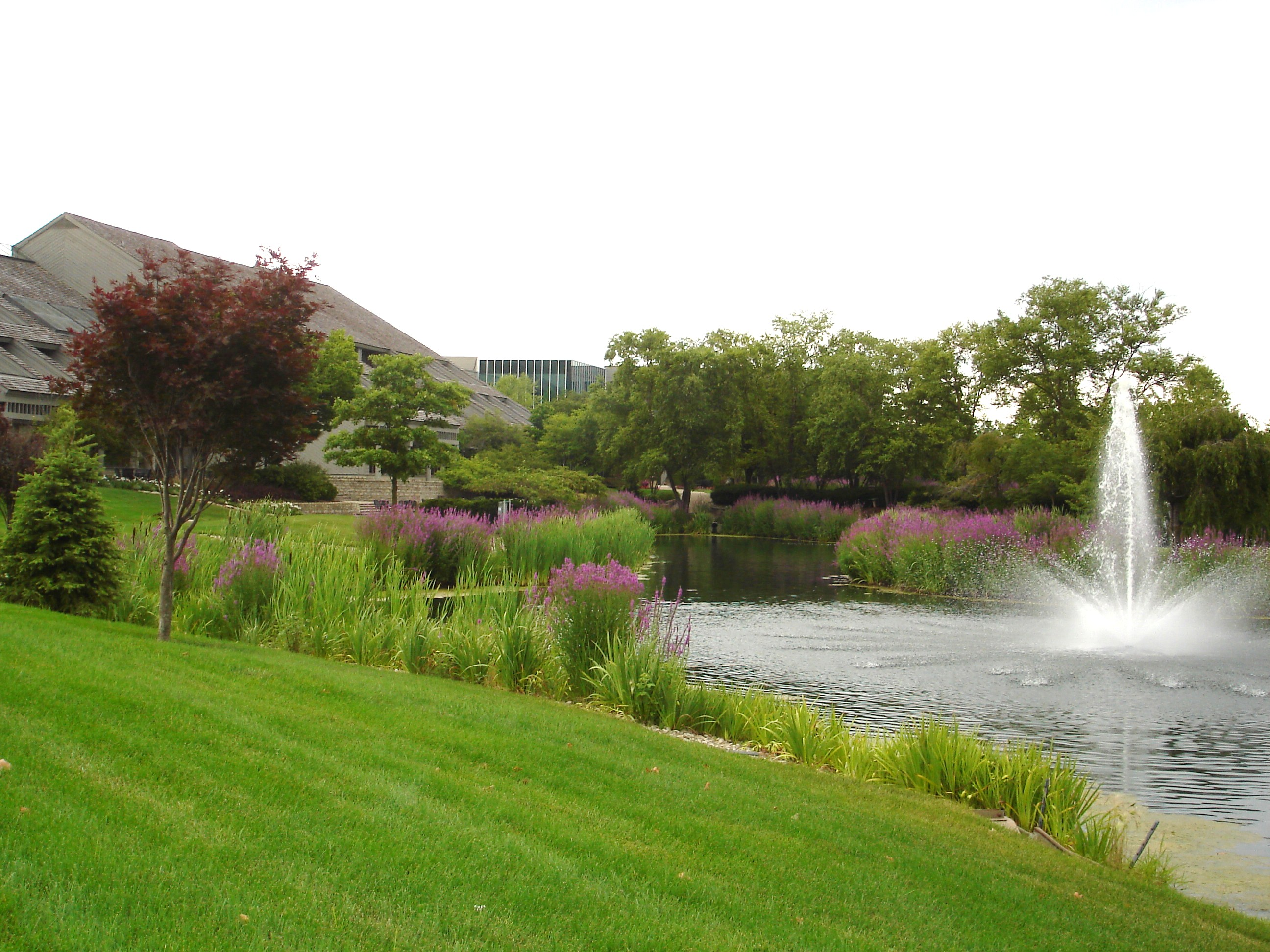
Scotts Miracle-Gro global headquarters

Marysville is the headquarters for Scotts Miracle-Gro Company, the largest producer in the world of horticulture products. The company was founded in 1868 by Orlando Scott in Marysville, and has grown to have an $8 billion market.

Honda Development and Manufacturing of America's Marysville plant is located near Marysville. The first production facilities opened by Honda in the United States were the Marysville Motorcycle Plant (1979-2009) and the Marysville Auto Plant (1982), located about six miles (10 km) northwest of the city. The Marysville Auto Plant has been the leading producer of the Honda Accord since 1982.

Marysville is also home to the corporate headquarters of Univenture, which manufactures and markets media packaging and a Parker Hannifin (formerly Denison Hydraulics) manufacturing facility. There is a Continental rubber conveyor belt factory formerly Goodyear Tire and Rubber Company manufacturing facility, located within city limits.

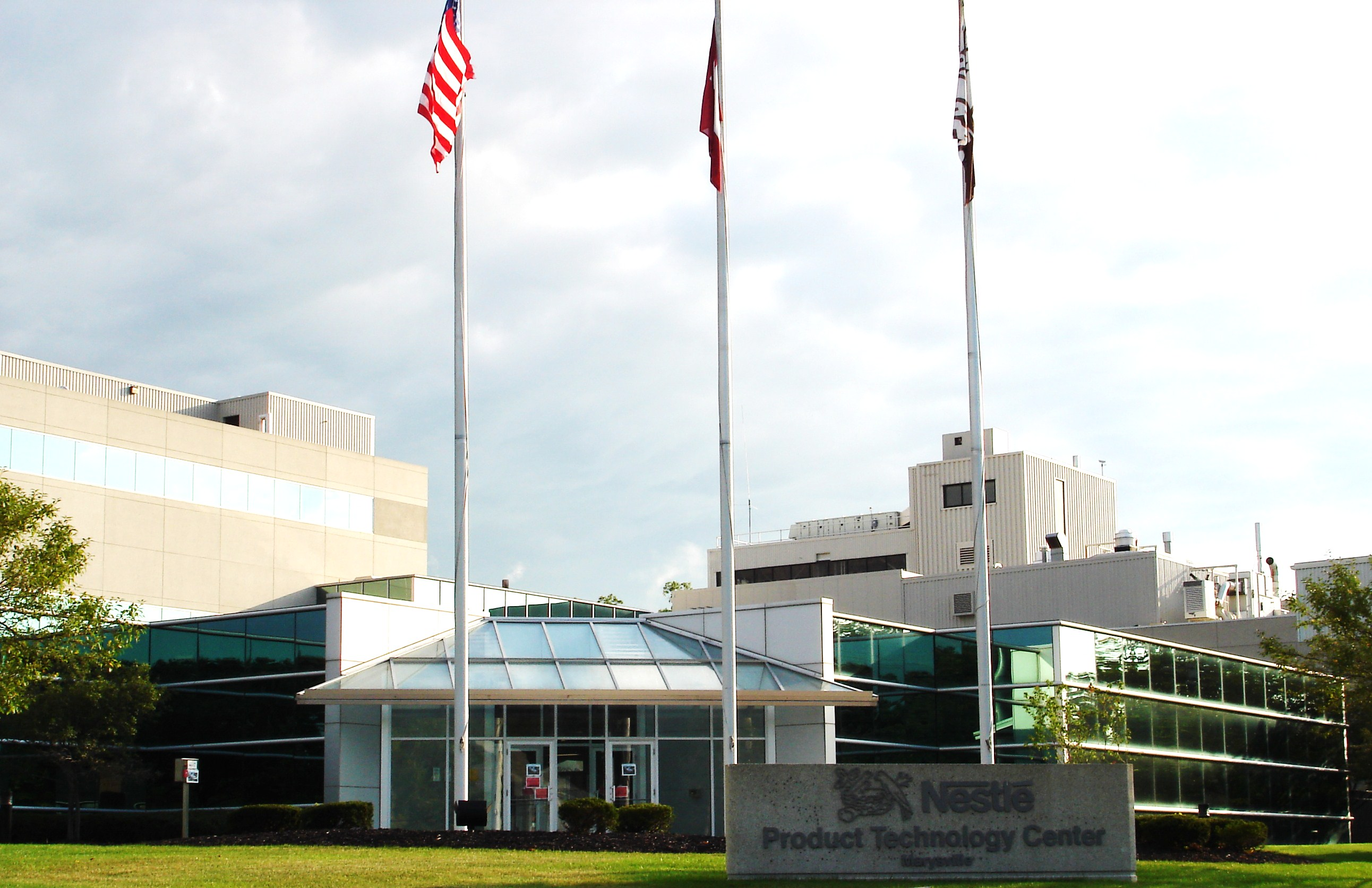
Nestlé Product Technology Center

Marysville is home to several research and development operations. Nestlé, located on the west side of the city, has a Product Technology Center dedicated to ready-to-drink mixes. Scotts Miracle Gro also has their R&D operations located on their corporate campus east of the city. The Transportation Research Center is located a few miles from Marysville in East Liberty near the Honda manufacturing campus. A unit of Univenture, Algae Venture Systems, recently made a breakthrough by developing a process to produce algae as a cost-effective biofuel.

== Arts and culture ==
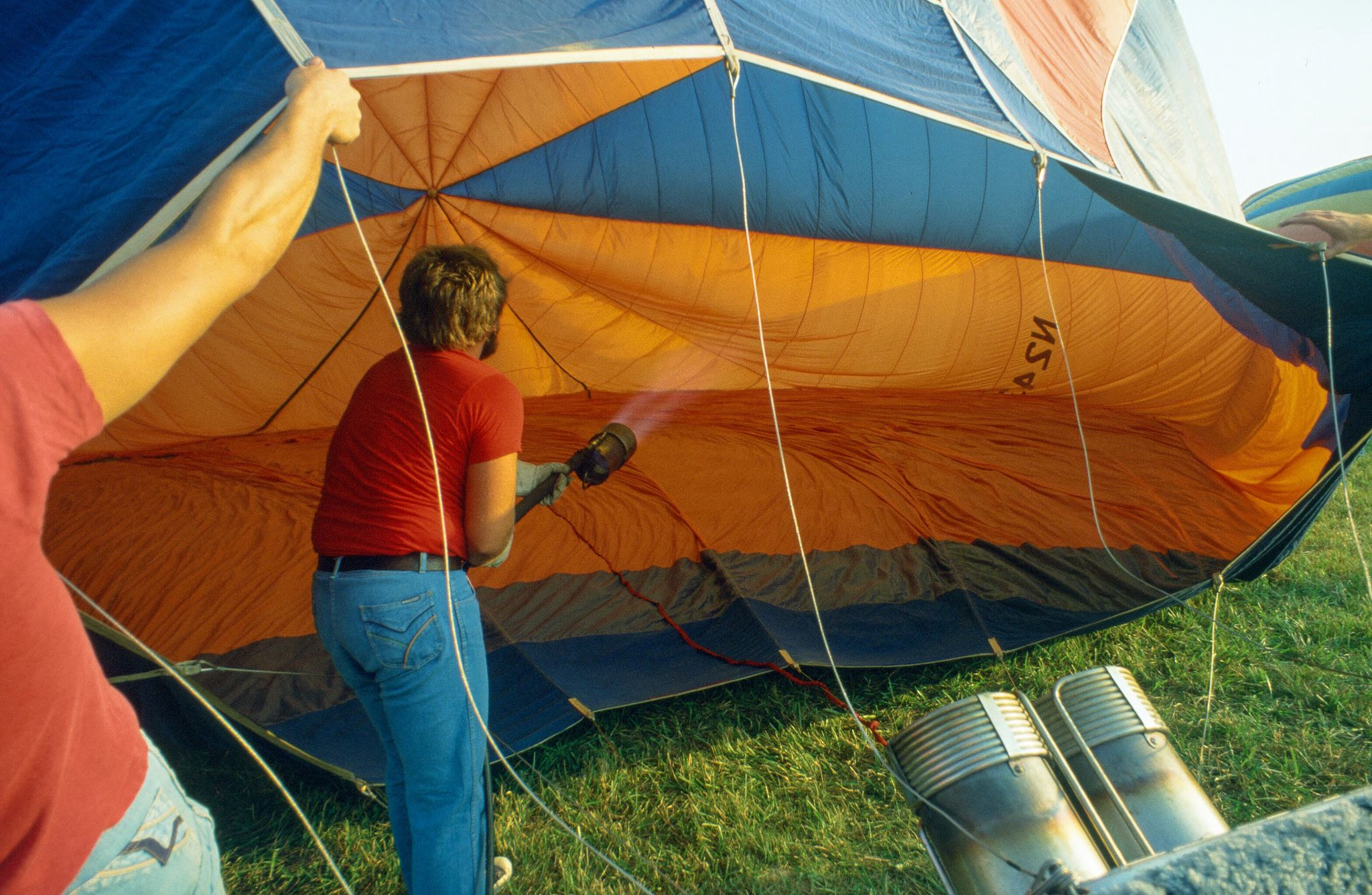
Marysville Balloon Festival, circa 1980

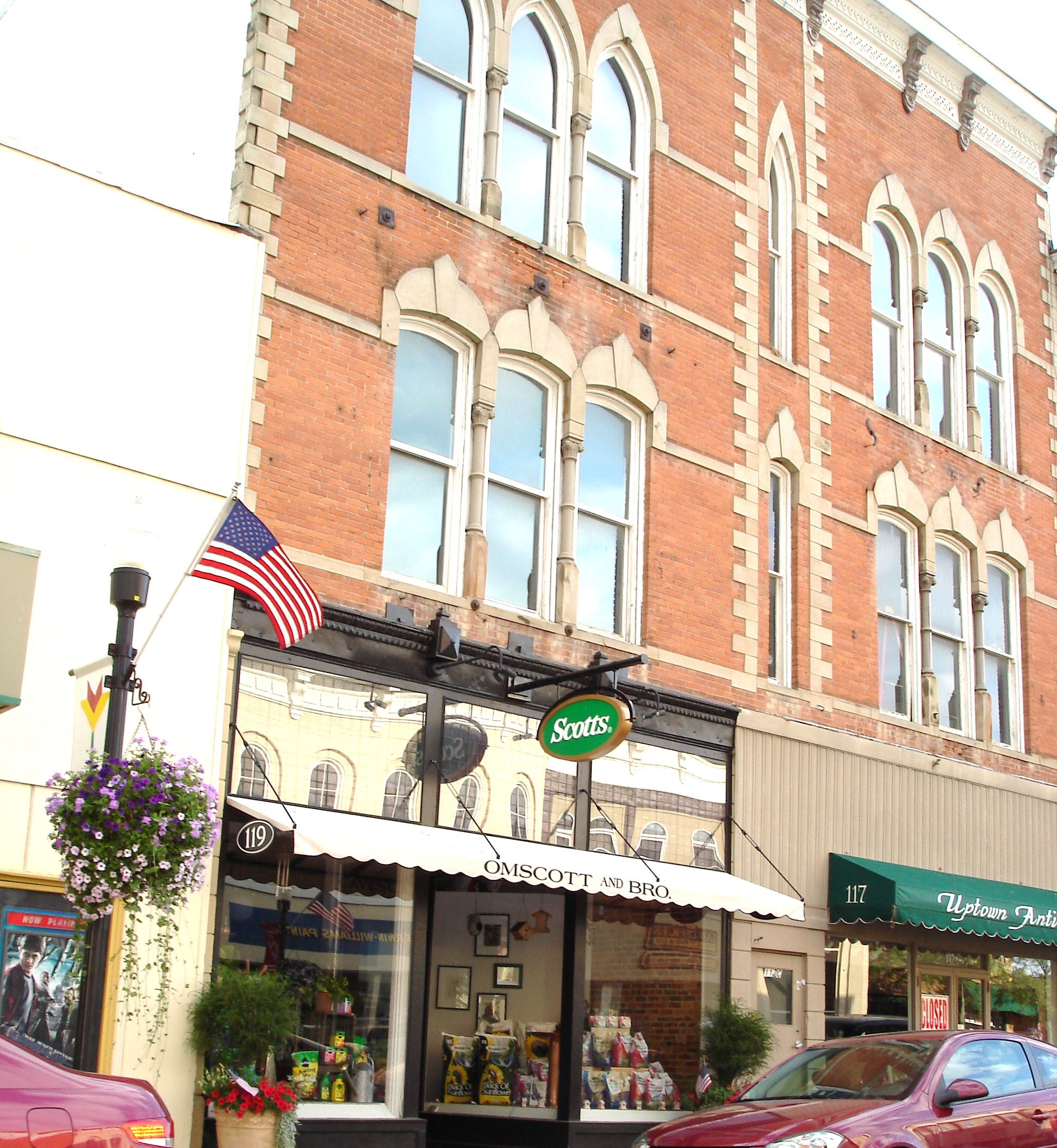
Scotts Miracle-Gro museum, Uptown

Marysville is also host to events throughout the year such as:

- The Union County Fair (late July-early August)
- Festifair (Saturday after Labor Day)
- All Ohio Balloon Festival

There are several horse farms and equine centers located in the Marysville area, as are several local golf clubs. The Piatt Castles, Covered Bridges of Union County, and the Big Darby Plains Scenic Byway are a short drive away.

The Scotts Miracle-Gro museum is located just south of the square in Uptown. In 2026, the corporation was tasked with restoring the White House lawn after sport activity there damaged it.

The Marysville Public Library is located on Plum Street near Uptown.

== Parks and recreation ==
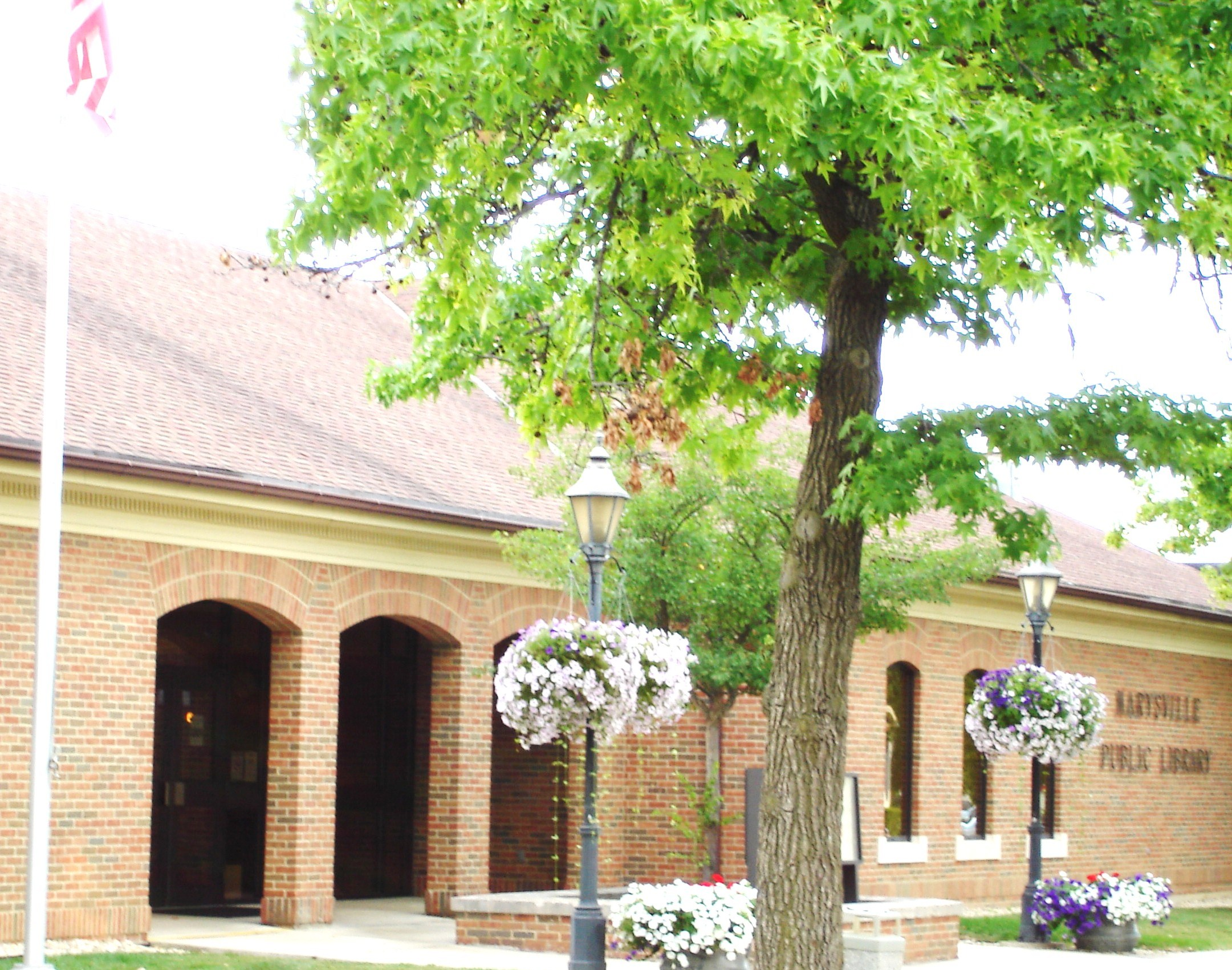
Marysville Public Library

There are numerous parks, totaling over 300 acres (1.2 km^{2}). They include such features as walking and bike nature trails along Mill Creek, with trails at Aldersgate, Eljers, McCarthy, Mill Creek, Mill Valley South and Central, and Shwartzkopf parks. There is an amphitheater at the American Legion park, soccer and baseball fields at Eljer, Lewis, Mill Creek, and Mill Valley South and Central parks, lighted tennis courts at Eljer and Lewis parks, basketball courts at the American Legion and Aldersgate park with lighted courts at Eljer and Lewis parks, and a football field at Lewis park. There is fishing at Aldersgate, McCarthy, Mill Creek, Mill Valley Central, and Shwartzkopf parks. There is a nature preserve at MacIvor Woods. There is a Frisbee golf course, and a skateboard park at Eljer Park.

== Education ==
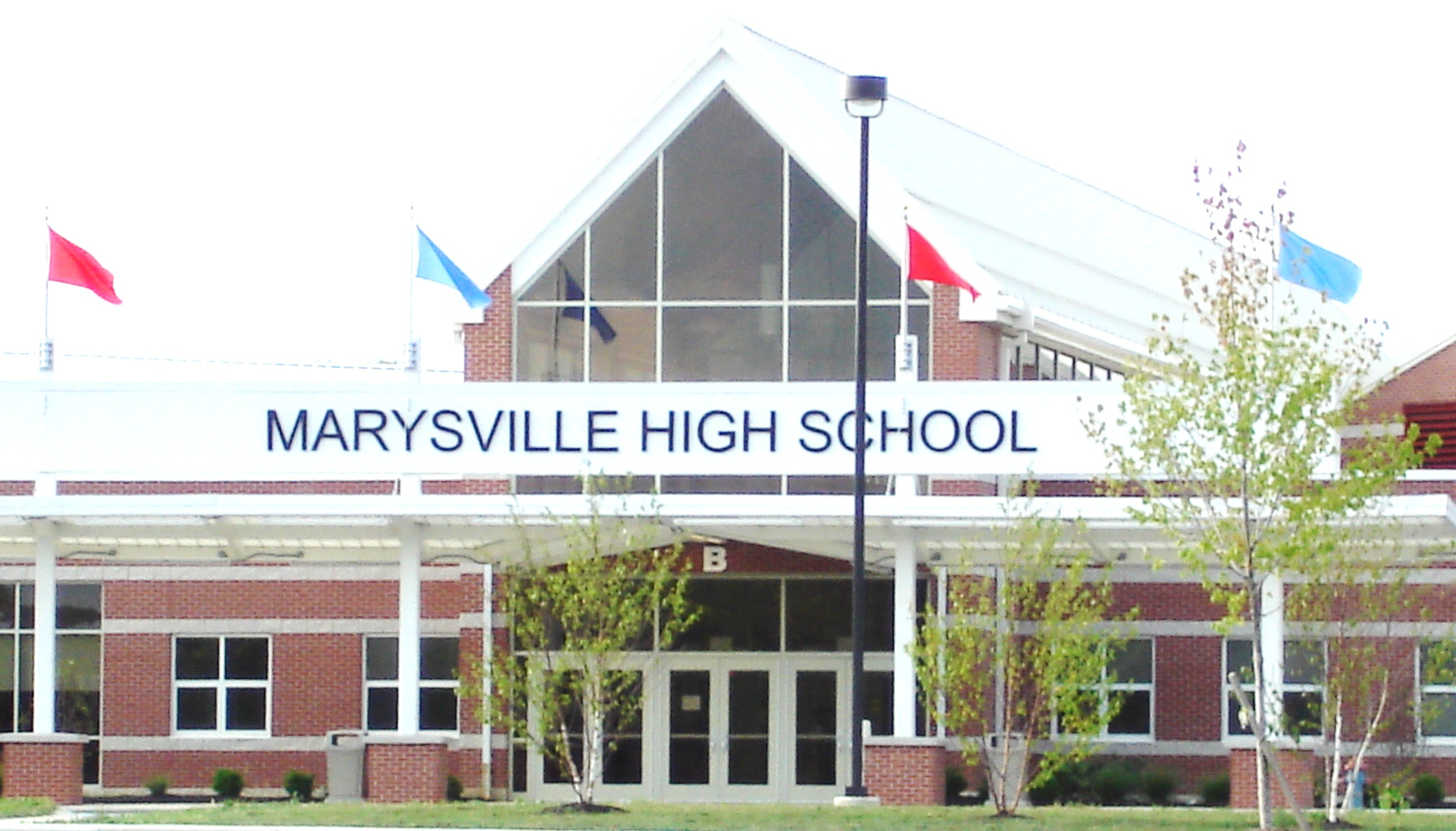
Marysville High School

Almost all of Marysville is part of the Marysville Exempted Village Schools District. A few parcels of land extend into Fairbanks Local School District. Marysville High School is the comprehensive high school of the former district.

Besides the Marysville Exempted Village School district, there are other opportunities for education as well. The local church-affiliated St. John's Lutheran School and Trinity Lutheran School both have curricula for students up through the middle school level, and the LEADS Head Start program is a preschool and childhood development program which, in their own words, "serves income eligible families with children ages three and four, including children with special needs."

The Columbus Japanese Language School, a weekend school for Japanese people, holds its classes at Creekview Intermediate School and did so since September 2021. The school office is in Worthington.

== Media ==
The Marysville Journal-Tribune is the oldest newspaper establishment in the city, dating back to 1849. The Gaumer-Behrens family has owned the newspaper since 1904. Their electronic version has been awarded the "Best Website In The State Award" by the Associated Press.

== Infrastructure ==
=== Transportation ===
The Union County Airport is located one nautical mile (1.2 mi; 1.9 km) southeast of Marysville's central business district.

U.S. Route 33 is a four-lane controlled-access highway that runs through Marysville, connecting the city with major highways including Interstate 75 to the northwest, and the I-270 outerbelt to the southeast, which links with Interstates 70 and 71 in Columbus. Rt. 33 is considered one of the major transportation arteries in Ohio.

Marysville freight rail traffic is served by CSX. There is no passenger rail service.

=== Utilities ===
The City opened new sewer facilities and a water reservoir in 2009. Union county is currently the third fastest growing county in the state of Ohio.

In 2009, Marysville became the first city in Central Ohio to employ the use of inflatable dam technology, which was built on Mill Creek. The dam is part of the new water reservoir system.

The city of Marysville is serviced by Dayton Power and Light, with the surrounding area also served, depending on location, by Union Rural Electric and AEP Ohio.

=== State prison ===
Marysville is home to Ohio Reformatory for Women.

=== Healthcare ===
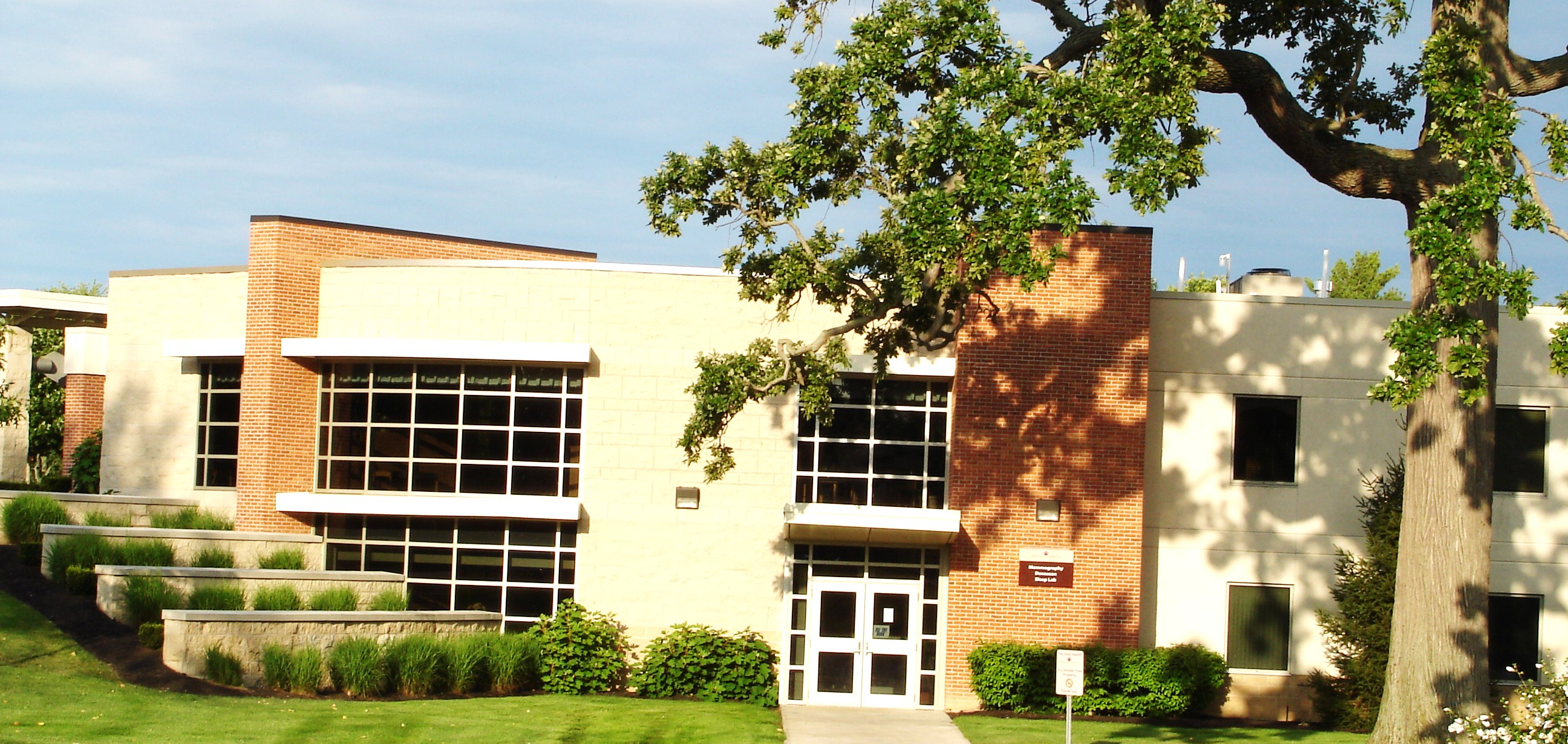
Memorial Hospital

Marysville is home to numerous physicians' offices, and Memorial Health. The hospital recently underwent a multimillion-dollar renovation, bringing it into the modern era. Currently it is a 107-bed building, with a primary and emergency care center, and numerous other services including laboratory and imaging services. They also have long-term nursing care and an occupational health center.

In 2009, Memorial was named as one of the nation's most technologically improved centers by Health & Hospitals Network magazine. The Ohio State University Heart Center opened there in 2009. In 2014, Memorial opened the City Gate Medical Center located at 120 Coleman's Crossing Blvd. which houses sports medicine, physical therapy, orthopedics and sports medicine, urgent care and an imaging location. Marysville is also home to several Chiropractic offices.

== Notable people ==
- Robert S. Beightler, military general, engineer, contributor to the modern Interstate Highway System and Ohio Turnpike
- Robert S. Beightler Jr., aide to U.S. President Harry Truman
- Chase Blackburn, football player
- Arthur E. Drumm, industrialist, inventor, industrial broom pioneer
- Cornelia Cole Fairbanks, United States Second Lady and former President-General of the Daughters of the American Revolution
- Charles Coleman Finlay, science fiction and fantasy author
- Darren Hall, baseball player
- Cornelius S. Hamilton, United States Congressman
- John F. Kinney, jurist and politician
- Natalia Laschenova, former Soviet Latvian gymnast, 1988 Olympic gold medalist
- Reuben Partridge, local pioneer and bridge builder
- Dorothy Pelanda, first woman to serve as Director of the Ohio Department of Agriculture
- Preston B. Plumb, United States Senator
- James E. Robinson, Ohio Supreme Court Justice, maternal great-grandfather of U.S. President George W. Bush
- James Wallace Robinson, United States Congressman
- Orlando Scott, founder of the O.M. Scott and Sons Company, later becoming the Scotts Miracle-Gro Company
- Kathryn Sellers, first woman appointed to be a United States Federal Judge
- Gary Shirk, football player
- Thomas B. Ward, United States Congressman

== Sister city ==
- Yorii, Japan (since 2013)
