= 101.3 FM =

FM radio frequency

The following radio stations broadcast on FM frequency 101.3 MHz:

== Argentina ==
- Radio Hollywood in Rosario, Santa Fe
- LRI400 in Venado Tuerto, Santa Fe

== Australia ==
- 2CFM in Gosford, New South Wales
- 3WPR in Wangaratta, Victoria
- 3WWM in Horsham, Victoria
- TOTE Sport Radio in Devonport, Tasmania
- 101.3 FM Noosa Community Radio in Noosa, Sunshine Coast Queensland

== Belize ==
- Lighthouse Radio at San Pedro Town

== Canada (Channel 267) ==
- CBRR-FM in Cranbrook, British Columbia
- CBWA-FM in Manigotagan, Manitoba
- CHEQ-FM in Sainte-Marie, Quebec
- CIFM-FM-4 in Clinton, British Columbia
- CIME-FM-2 in Mont-Tremblant, Quebec
- CJAI-FM in Stella, Ontario
- CJCH-FM in Halifax, Nova Scotia
- CJEG-FM in Bonnyville, Alberta
- CJNK-FM-1 in Algonquin Park, Ontario
- CJNK-FM-2 in Algonquin Park, Ontario
- CJSA-FM in Toronto, Ontario
- CJSK-FM in Campement Sarcelle, Quebec
- CKII-FM in Dolbeau/Mistassini, Quebec
- CKIK-FM in Red Deer, Alberta
- CKKN-FM in Prince George, British Columbia
- CKOT-FM in Tillsonburg, Ontario
- CKUN-FM in Christian Island, Ontario
- CKXG-FM-1 in Lewisporte, Newfoundland and Labrador
- VF2150 in Labrador City, Newfoundland and Labrador
- VF2545 in Powell River, British Columbia

== Germany ==
- Klassik Radio in Berlin
- Antenne 1 in Stuttgart

== India ==
- FM Rainbow 101.3 in Bengaluru, Karnataka and its surrounding regions run by All India Radio

== Israel ==
- Kan Reka in Arabah, Beersheba, the Galilee Panhandle, Gush Dan, Haifa, Jerusalem, the Jordan Rift Valley and Negev

== Malaysia ==
- Kool FM in Klang Valley
- Era in Miri, Sarawak
- Ai FM in Kedah, Perlis and Penang
- Wai FM in Kuching, Sarawak

== Mexico ==
- XHABCA-FM in Mexicali, Baja California
- XHAPS-FM in Agua Prieta, Sonora
- XHAW-FM in Monterrey, Nuevo León
- XHAWD-FM in San Luis Potosí, San Luis Potosí
- XHBN-FM in Ciudad Delicias, Chihuahua
- XHCAV-FM in Durango, Durango
- XHFX-FM in Guaymas, Sonora
- XHIW-FM in Uruapan, Michoacán
- XHMAB-FM in Ciudad del Carmen, Campeche
- XHMSL-FM in Los Mochis, Sinaloa
- XHPORO-FM in Concepción del Oro, Zacatecas
- XHPTUX-FM in San Juan Bautista Tuxtepec, Oaxaca
- XHSCCH-FM in Calvillo, Aguascalientes
- XHSCDL-FM in Juchitán, Oaxaca
- XHTAN-FM in Huayacocotla, Veracruz
- XHTQ-FM in Ixhuatlancillo, Veracruz
- XHVP-FM in Atlixco, Puebla
- XHZA-FM in Toluca, Estado de México

== United States (Channel 267) ==
- KARV-FM in Ola, Arkansas
- KATY in Idyllwild, California
- KBNF-LP in Ruston, Louisiana
- KDPX in Pine Bluff, Arkansas
- KDWB in Richfield, Minnesota
- KERW in Los Osos-Baywood Par, California
- KFDI in Wichita, Kansas
- KFEZ in Walsenburg, Colorado
- KGDN in Pasco, Washington
- KGOT in Anchorage, Alaska
- KHNZ in Lefors, Texas
- KIKC in Forsyth, Montana
- KIOI in San Francisco, California
- KIQX in Durango, Colorado
- KJSO-LP in Omaha, Nebraska
- KKEE in Centerville, Texas
- KKGB in Sulphur, Louisiana
- KKYY in Whiting, Iowa
- KLAW in Lawton, Oklahoma
- KLWA in Westport, Washington
- KLZA in Falls City, Nebraska
- KMCO in Wilburton, Oklahoma
- KMMZ in Crane, Texas
- KNCN in Sinton, Texas
- KOBT-LP in Grand Forks, North Dakota
- KOWI in Oatman, Arizona
- KOXE in Brownwood, Texas
- KOZY-FM in Bridgeport, Nebraska
- KPCG-LP in Edmond, Oklahoma
- KRGR-LP in Paradise, California
- KRNG in Fallon, Nevada
- KRYK in Chinook, Montana
- KSIB-FM in Creston, Iowa
- KTGC-LP in Saint Regis, Montana
- KTZE-LP in Kountze, Texas
- KUKE-LP in Kula, Hawaii
- KUUL in East Moline, Illinois
- KWIE in Hinkley, California
- KWTO-FM in Buffalo, Missouri
- KXNB-LP in Omaha, Nebraska
- KYLZ in Albuquerque, New Mexico
- WAGF in Dothan, Alabama
- WAGH in Smiths, Alabama
- WAGX in Manchester, Ohio
- WBAA-FM in West Lafayette, Indiana
- WBBV in Vicksburg, Mississippi
- WBFX in Grand Rapids, Michigan
- WBRB in Buckhannon, West Virginia
- WBRV in Boonville, New York
- WCHK-FM in Milford, Delaware
- WCMT in South Fulton, Tennessee
- WCPV in Essex, New York
- WDRO-LP in Monticello, Mississippi
- WECO-FM in Wartburg, Tennessee
- WEVI in Frederiksted, Virgin Islands
- WFAQ-LP in Mukwonago, Wisconsin
- WFMG in Richmond, Indiana
- WGGY in Scranton, Pennsylvania
- WHIW-LP in Harvard, Illinois
- WHLG in Port Saint Lucie, Florida
- WIHE-LP in Liberty, Kentucky
- WIUK-LP in Iuka, Mississippi
- WJDQ in Meridian, Mississippi
- WJJD-LP in Kokomo, Indiana
- WJKE in Stillwater, New York
- WKCI in Hamden, Connecticut
- WKFT in Strattanville, Pennsylvania
- WKJJ-LP in Milwaukee, Wisconsin
- WLVN in Grenada, Mississippi
- WMCI in Mattoon, Illinois
- WMJM in Jeffersontown, Kentucky
- WMSK in Sturgis, Kentucky
- WNCO-FM in Ashland, Ohio
- WNHE-LP in New Haven, Indiana
- WOHP-LP in Huntsville, Ohio
- WOPC in Linden, Tennessee
- WPJQ-LP in Milwaukee, Wisconsin
- WPVR-LP in Mount Airy, North Carolina
- WQIL in Chauncey, Georgia
- WQMR-LP in Rocky Mount, Virginia
- WQPO in Harrisonburg, Virginia
- WRKD-LP in Rockford, Ohio
- WRMM in Rochester, New York
- WROZ in Lancaster, Pennsylvania
- WSUE in Sault Sainte Marie, Michigan
- WTMG in Williston, Florida
- WTOA-LP in Albany, Georgia
- WVAI-LP in Charlottesville, Virginia
- WVIL in Virginia, Illinois
- WVQM in Augusta, Maine
- WWDE in Hampton, Virginia
- WWDM in Sumter, South Carolina
- WWQQ in Wilmington, North Carolina
- WXJK in Farmville, Virginia
- WYKR in Haverhill, New Hampshire
- WZFM in Narrows, Virginia
