= 93.3 FM =

FM radio frequency

The following radio stations broadcast on FM frequency 93.3 MHz:

== Argentina ==
- Atlántica latina in Mar del Plata, Buenos Aires
- BitBox in Buenos Aires
- Central de noticias Madariaga in Madariaga, Buenos Aires
- Ciudad Noticias in Coronel Suarez, Buenos Aires
- del Aire in La Plata, Buenos Aires
- El triunfo rural in General Belgrano, Buenos Aires
- Espacial in Santa Fe
- Estilo in Fray Mamerto Esquiú, Catamarca
- Fox FM in Rosario, Santa Fe
- Global in Zárate, Buenos Aires
- Mas in El Colorado, Formosa
- Mitre Salta in Salta
- Mix in Eduardo Castex, La Pampa
- Norte in Rufino, Santa Fe
- Positiva in Puerto Madryn, Chubut
- Quiero Radio in Crespo, Entre Ríos
- Radio María in Pehuajó, Buenos Aires
- Radio María in Juan Bautista Alberdi, Tucumán
- Radio María in San Martín de los Andes, Neuquén
- Radio María in Eldorado, Misiones
- Rock and Pop Jujuy in San Salvador de Jujuy, Jujuy
- Siempre radio in Alta Gracia, Córdoba
- Temple in Haedo, Buenos Aires
- Universo - Vida General Arenales in General Arenales, Buenos Aires
- Vale in 9 de Julio, Buenos Aires
- Venecia in Federal, Entre Ríos

== Australia ==
- Radio Five-0-Plus in Gosford, New South Wales
- SBS Radio in Brisbane, Queensland
- ABC Classic in Launceston, Tasmania
- ABC Classic in Hamilton, Victoria
- ABC Classic in Bunbury, Western Australia

== Brunei ==
- Nur Islam (subsidiary of Radio Television Brunei)

== Canada (Channel 227) ==
- CBH-FM-1 in Middleton, Nova Scotia
- CBKA-FM-1 in Creighton, Saskatchewan
- CBKH-FM in Stony Rapids, Saskatchewan
- CBKL-FM in Montreal Lake, Saskatchewan
- CBT-FM in Grand Falls-Windsor, Newfoundland and Labrador
- CFMU-FM in Hamilton, Ontario
- CFRU-FM in Guelph, Ontario
- CFXG-FM in Grande Cache, Alberta
- CFXU-FM in Antigonish, Nova Scotia
- CFYX-FM in Mont-Joli, Quebec
- CICH-FM in Chesterfield Inlet, Nunavut
- CIQA-FM in Iqaluit, Nunavut
- CIRC-FM in Fredericton, New Brunswick
- CISV-FM in Swan River, Manitoba
- CJAV-FM in Port Alberni, British Columbia
- CJBZ-FM in Taber, Alberta
- CJHD-FM in North Battleford, Saskatchewan
- CJMF-FM in Quebec City, Quebec
- CJOK-FM in Fort McMurray, Alberta
- CKGF-1-FM in Christina Lake, British Columbia
- CKRY-FM-2 in Banff, Alberta
- CKSG-FM in Cobourg, Ontario
- CKYL-FM-6 in Manning, Alberta
- VF2211 in Horse Camp Hill, Yukon
- VF2358 in Stewart Crossing, Yukon
- VF2366 in Sourdough, Yukon
- VF2504 in Paint Lake, Manitoba
- VF8020 in Rimbey, Alberta

== Chile ==
- Radio Cooperativa in Santiago, Copiapó and San Antonio

== China ==
- CNR Music Radio in Jinggangshan
- Radio Jiangmen Voice Of Travelling in Jiangmen

== Colombia ==
- Radio Sinigual in Medellín, Antioquia
- Radio Sinigual in Rionegro, Antioquia
- Normal Stereo in Arauca, Arauca

== Honduras ==
- HRAX Musiquera San Pedro Sula, Cortés
- HRAX Musiquera Puerto Cortés, Cortés
- HRXH Radio Globo Tocoa, Colón

== Iraq ==
- Radio Al Mirbad in Basra

== Israel ==
- Radio Lev HaMedina in the Shephelah

== Japan ==
- JONR in Osaka
- JOGF in Oita

== Malaysia ==
- Kool 101 in Ipoh, Perak (Coming Soon)

== Mexico ==
- XHACC-FM in Puerto Escondido, Oaxaca
- XHBW-FM in Chihuahua, Chihuahua
- XHCF-FM in Los Mochis, Sinaloa
- XHEDT-FM in Toluca, Estado de México
- XHEVE-FM in Colima, Colima
- XHEXZ-FM in Zacatecas, Zacatecas
- XHOLP-FM in Santa Rosalía, Baja California Sur
- XHPGYM-FM in Guaymas, Sonora
- XHPJMM-FM in José María Morelos, Quintana Roo
- XHPNIC-FM in Nicolás Bravo, Quintana Roo
- XHPNVA-FM in Nueva Italia, Michoacán
- XHPNVO-FM in El Salto, Pueblo Nuevo Municipality, Durango
- XHPS-FM in Veracruz, Veracruz
- XHQQ-FM in Monterrey, Nuevo León
- XHSCA-FM in Cananea, Sonora
- XHSCCF-FM in Tlacolula de Matamoros, Oaxaca
- XHTB-FM in Cuernavaca, Morelos
- XHVSE-FM in Villa Sola de Vega, Oaxaca

== Philippines ==
- DWBY in Roxas, Oriental Mindoro
- DXFB in Dipolog
- DXHR in Butuan City
- DWIC in Tuguegarao
- DWGQ in Gumaca, Quezon
- DXSJ in Surigao City, Surigao Del Norte

== Singapore ==
- YES 933 in Singapore

== Turkey ==
- TRT Radyo 1 in Ankara

== United States (Channel 227) ==
- KAGL in El Dorado, Arkansas
- KBGT in Buffalo Gap, Texas
- KBHR in Big Bear City, California
- KBLB in Nisswa, Minnesota
- KBOK-LP in Reno, Nevada
- KCEF in Chefornak, Alaska
- KCFZ-LP in Fresno, California
- KDKB in Mesa, Arizona
- KETQ-LP in Yuba City, California
- KEUB in Gearhart, Oregon
- KFFF in Bennington, Nebraska
- KFPP-LP in Woodward, Oklahoma
- KFZR-LP in Frazier Park, California
- KGAR-LP in Lemoore, California
- KGGL in Missoula, Montana
- KGSR in Cedar Park, Texas
- KHSK in Emmonak, Alaska
- KHTS-FM in El Cajon, California
- KIGL in Seligman, Missouri
- KIIW-LP in Dobbins, California
- KIOA in Des Moines, Iowa
- KJDX in Susanville, California
- KJKE in Newcastle, Oklahoma
- KJR-FM in Seattle, Washington
- KJRV in Wessington Springs, South Dakota
- KKDC in Dolores, Colorado
- KKNU in Springfield-Eugene, Oregon
- KKSP in Bryant, Arkansas
- KKWG in Kongiganak, Alaska
- KLED in Antelope Valley-Crestview, Wyoming
- KLIT in Ranchitos Las Lomas, Texas
- KMJI in Ashdown, Arkansas
- KMOR in Gering, Nebraska
- KMXV in Kansas City, Missouri
- KNAL in Port Lavaca, Texas
- KNTO in Chowchilla, California
- KOBQ in Albuquerque, New Mexico
- KOXZ-LP in Ventura, California
- KPHD-LP in Modesto, California
- KQBU in Port Arthur, Texas
- KRHV in Big Pine, California
- KRKL in Walla Walla, Washington
- KRMR in Russian Mission, Alaska
- KRTK in Hermann, Missouri
- KRWD in Muleshoe, Texas
- KRZZ in San Francisco, California
- KSJZ in Jamestown, North Dakota
- KTCL in Wheat Ridge, Colorado
- KUBL in Salt Lake City, Utah
- KUIT in Goodnews Bay, Alaska
- KUMC-LP in Rupert, Idaho
- KURL in Billings, Montana
- KUZY in Nunum Iqua, Alaska
- KVAK in Valdez, Alaska
- KWEM-LP in West Memphis, Arkansas
- KWNQ in Quinhagak, Alaska
- KXAZ in Page, Arizona
- KXBA in Nikiski, Alaska
- KYLO-LP in Woodland, California
- KYRR-LP in Nevada City, California
- KZBT in Midland, Texas
- KZHP-LP in Sacramento, California
- KZOZ in San Luis Obispo, California
- WAKW in Cincinnati, Ohio
- WBAP-FM in Haltom City, Texas
- WBSV-LP in Berrien Springs, Michigan
- WBSZ in Ashland, Wisconsin
- WBTU in Kendallville, Indiana
- WBWZ in New Paltz, New York
- WBZD in Muncy, Pennsylvania
- WCAN in Canajoharie, New York
- WCIZ in Watertown, New York
- WDNS in Bowling Green, Kentucky
- WERO in Washington, North Carolina
- WFAR in Danbury, Connecticut
- WFKL in Fairport, New York
- WFLS in Fredericksburg, Virginia
- WFLZ in Tampa, Florida
- WFOC-LP in Florence, South Carolina
- WFYN-LP in Birmingham, Alabama
- WHJG-LP in Rockford, Illinois
- WIZM in La Crosse, Wisconsin
- WJBT in Callahan, Florida
- WJOB-FM in Susquehanna, Pennsylvania
- WKCJ in White Sulphur Springs, West Virginia
- WKQZ in Midland, Michigan
- WKVW in Marmet, West Virginia
- WKYQ in Paducah, Kentucky
- WLDB in Milwaukee, Wisconsin
- WLVC-LP in Birmingham, Alabama
- WMMR in Philadelphia, Pennsylvania
- WNCD in Youngstown, Ohio
- WNCV in Shalimar, Florida
- WNHW in Belmont, New Hampshire
- WNRB-LP in Wausau, Wisconsin
- WODC in Ashville, Ohio
- WOGR in Salisbury, North Carolina
- WOPW-LP in Mount Vernon, Kentucky
- WPBG in Peoria, Illinois
- WPJB-LP in Selma, Alabama
- WPLP-LP in Athens, Georgia
- WPLX-LP in Pelham, Alabama
- WQTY in Linton, Indiana
- WQUE in New Orleans, Louisiana
- WQZS in Meyersdale, Pennsylvania
- WRFR-LP in Rockland, Maine
- WSHD-LP in Eastport, Maine
- WSLP in Ray Brook, New York
- WSNE in Taunton, Massachusetts
- WSYE in Houston, Mississippi
- WTPP-LP in Gobles, Michigan
- WTPT in Forest City, North Carolina
- WTRH in Ramsey, Illinois
- WVFJ in Manchester, Georgia
- WVFT in Gretna, Florida
- WWDH-LP in Fort Myers, Florida
- WWFF in New Market, Alabama
- WWSE in Jamestown, New York
- WWWZ in Summerville, South Carolina
- WXLN-LP in Shelbyville, Kentucky
- WYPM in Chambersburg, Pennsylvania
- WZAE in Wadley, Georgia
- WZMT in Ponce, Puerto Rico

== Vietnam ==
- Ninh Binh Radio in Ninh Binh Province
