= WNRB =

WNRB may refer to:

- Wisconsin Natural Resources Board, governing body of the Wisconsin Department of Natural Resources
- WNRB-LP, a low power community radio station in Wausau, Wisconsin

== See also ==
- WFNR, which operated as radio station WNRB during 1984 in Virginia
- WMEX (AM), which operated as radio station WNRB during 1995–2001 in the Boston area
- WYOH, which operated as radio station WNRB during 1990–1994 in Ohio
- WNBR (disambiguation), a transposition of WNRB
