= CBKN =

CBKN may refer to:

- CBKN (AM), a radio rebroadcaster (990 AM) licensed to Shalalth, British Columbia, Canada, rebroadcasting CBTK-FM
- CBKN-FM, a radio rebroadcaster (105.1 FM) licensed to Island Falls, Saskatchewan, Canada, rebroadcasting CBKA-FM
