= KLIT =

KLIT may refer to:

- Little Rock National Airport (ICAO code KLIT)
- KLIT (FM), a radio station (93.5 FM) licensed to serve Zapata, Texas, United States
- KYLA, a radio station (92.7 FM) licensed to serve Fountain Valley, California, United States, which used the call sign KLIT from January 1997 to March 2007
- KSCA, a radio station (101.9 FM) licensed to serve Glendale, California, which used the call sign KLIT from October 1989 to September 1994
