= CBKJ =

CBKJ may refer to:

- CBKJ (AM), a radio rebroadcaster (860 AM) licensed to Gold River, British Columbia, Canada, rebroadcasting CBCV-FM
- CBKJ-FM, a radio rebroadcaster (94.1 FM) licensed to Pinehouse Lake, Saskatchewan, Canada, rebroadcasting CBKA-FM
