= CBKL =

CBKL may refer to:

- CBKL (AM), a radio rebroadcaster (1150) licensed to Alice Arm, British Columbia, Canada, rebroadcasting CFPR
- CBKL-FM, a radio rebroadcaster (93.3 FM) licensed to Montreal Lake, Saskatchewan, Canada, rebroadcasting CBKA-FM
