= CBKO =

CBKO may refer to:

- CBKO (AM), a radio rebroadcaster (540 AM) licensed to Coal Harbour, British Columbia, Canada, rebroadcasting CBCV-FM
- CBKO-FM, a radio rebroadcaster (94.3 FM) licensed to Denare Beach, Saskatchewan, Canada, rebroadcasting CBKA-FM
