= KVAK =

KVAK may refer to:

- KVAK-FM, a radio station (93.3 FM) licensed to Valdez, Alaska, United States
- KVAK (AM), a radio station (1230 AM) licensed since 1982 to Valdez, Alaska
- KVAK (Atchison, Kansas), a radio station formerly licensed to Atchison, Kansas
