= WRMS =

WRMS may refer to:

- Microsoft Windows Rights Management Services
- WRMS (AM), a radio station (790 AM) licensed to Beardstown, Illinois, United States
- WRMS-FM, a radio station (94.3 FM) licensed to Beardstown, Illinois, United States
- Washburn Rural Middle School, a middle school in Topeka, Kansas, United States
- Windemere Ranch Middle School, a middle school in San Ramon, California, United States.
