= XHPGYM-FM =

Radio station in Guaymas, Sonora, Mexico

- Guaymas, Sonora; Mexico
- Frequency: 93.3 FM
- Branding: Red 93.3

Programming
- Format: Pop

Ownership
- Owner: Sonora Emedios, S.A. de C.V.

History
- First air date: September 3, 2018
- Call sign meaning: GuaYMas

Technical information
- Licensing authority: CRT
- Class: B1
- ERP: 1.503 kW
- HAAT: 449.8 m (1,476 ft)
- Transmitter coordinates: 27°56′26.21″N 110°54′20.55″W

Links
- Website: red933.mx

XHPGYM-FM is a radio station on 93.3 FM in Guaymas, Sonora, Mexico. It is known as Red 93.3, broadcasting from a transmitter atop Cerro El Vigía in Guaymas.

== History ==
XHPGYM was awarded in the IFT-4 radio auction of 2017. In December of that year, the municipal government approved the transfer of a parcel of land atop Cerro El Vigía, home to the other broadcast stations in Guaymas, to Sonora Emedios to build its transmitting facilities. The first program produced by the station was its morning newscast "Noticias en Red", which began airing on June 11, 2018, on XHFX-FM 101.3. XHPGYM itself signed on September 3 of the same year.
