= CBKA =

CBKA may refer to:

- CBKA-FM, a radio station (105.9 FM) licensed to La Ronge, Saskatchewan, Canada
- CBKA (AM), a radio rebroadcaster (1450 AM) licensed to Stewart, British Columbia, Canada
