= Vinegar Hill Magazine =

American magazine

Vinegar Hill Magazine (2011- ), named after the historic Black neighborhood Vinegar Hill in Charlottesville, Virginia, is both a free and open source digital magazine and a subscription-based quarterly print periodical based on local African American culture, history, and life. It was founded by Edward “Eddie” Harris. Along with the newspaper Charlottesville Tomorrow and the radio show In My Humble Opinion (IMHO), which airs locally on WVAI 101.3 FM, Vinegar Hill Magazine forms part of the Charlottesville Inclusive Media Project (CIM). The magazine's chief operations officer is Sarad Davenport as of 2012. Following the 2022 win of a $50,000 grant the periodical won from Borealis Philanthropy, Katrina L. Spencer was hired as editor and content manager. She was succeeded by Sonia Montalvo. The magazine has included coverage of and interviews with prominent local figures including former Mayor Nikuyah Walker, author Jocelyn Nicole Jonson, and executive director of the Jefferson School Andrea Douglas. Many of the magazine's articles feature local Black entrepreneurs. The University of Virginia, Charlottesville subscribes to the publication as of 2022. The magazine received a commendation from the Virginia House of Delegates in 2024.
