= KJSO =

KJSO may refer to:

- KJSO-LP, a low-power radio station (101.3 FM) licensed to serve Omaha, Nebraska, United States
- Cherokee County Airport (Texas) (ICAO code KJSO)
