= CBKG =

CBKG may refer to:

- CBKG (AM), a radio rebroadcaster (920 AM) licensed to Granisle, British Columbia, Canada, rebroadcasting CBYG-FM
- CBKG-FM, a radio rebroadcaster (100.1 FM) licensed to Fond-du-Lac, Saskatchewan, Canada, rebroadcasting CBKA-FM
