= New Dover =

New Dover may refer to:

- New Dover, New Jersey
- New Dover, Ohio
