= XHZA-FM =

Radio station in Toluca, State of Mexico

Toluca, State of Mexico; Mexico
- Frequency: 101.3 MHz (HD Radio)
- Branding: Ultra 101.3

Ownership
- Owner: Grupo Ultra; (Ultradigital Toluca, S.A. de C.V.)

History
- First air date: June 28, 1972 (concession)
- Call sign meaning: ZorrillA

Technical information
- Class: C1
- ERP: 63,140 watts
- HAAT: 39.77 m
- Transmitter coordinates: 19°17′25.7″N 99°39′16.2″W
- Repeater(s): XHZA-FM Atlacomulco, State of Mexico (200 watts)

Links
- Webcast: Listen live
- Website: ultralaradio.mx

XHZA-FM is a radio station in Toluca, State of Mexico. Broadcasting on 101.3 FM, XHZA is owned by Grupo Ultra and is known as Ultra 101.3.

== History ==
XHZA received its concession on June 28, 1972. It was owned by Arturo Zorrilla Martínez, the founder of Ultra.
