= Leesburg Township, Union County, Ohio =

Township in Ohio, US

- Township
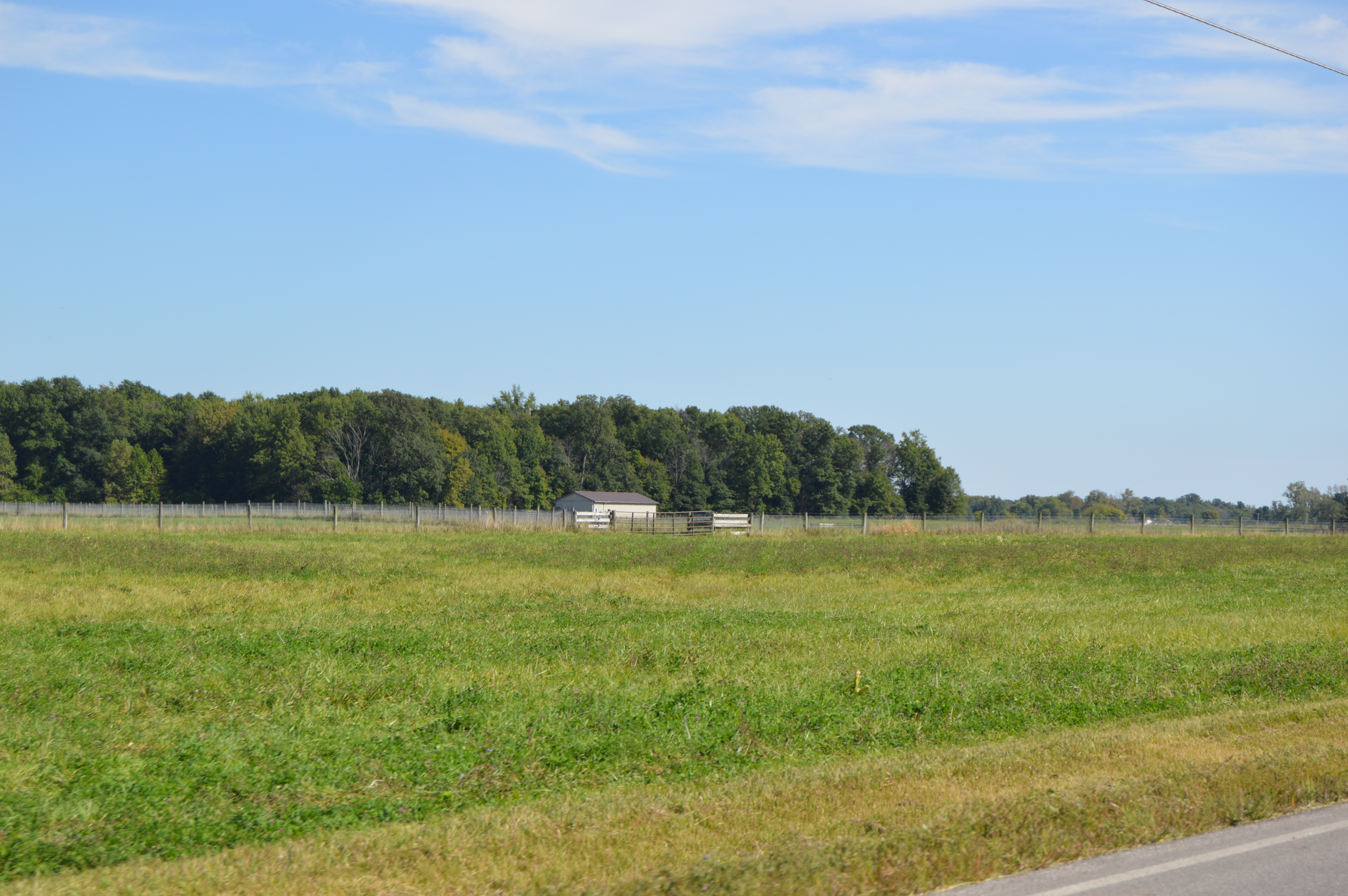
- Fields north of Magnetic Springs

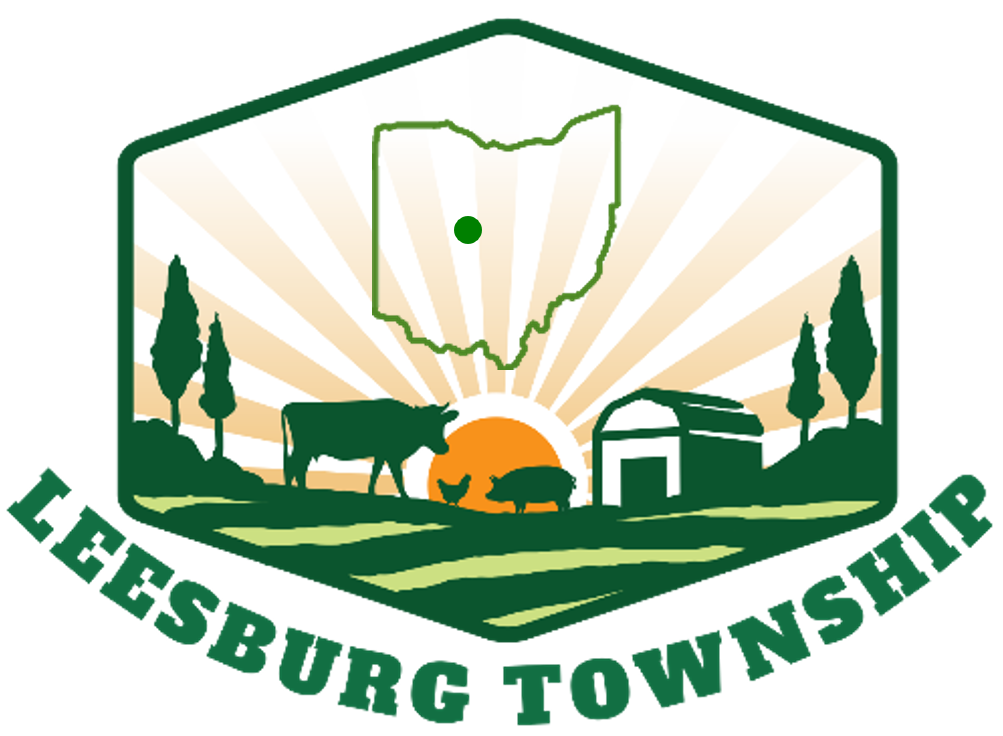
- Seal

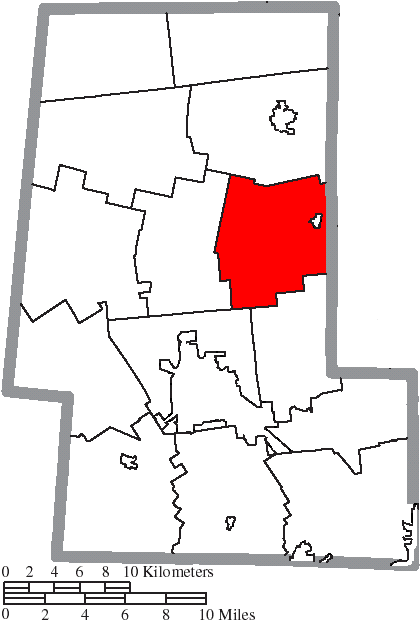
- Location of Leesburg Township in Union County
- Coordinates: 40°20′29″N 83°18′14″W
- Country: United States
- State: Ohio
- County: Union

Area
  - Total: 30.6 sq mi (79.3 km^{2})
  - Land: 30.6 sq mi (79.3 km^{2})
  - Water: 0 sq mi (0.0 km^{2})
- Elevation: 958 ft (292 m)

Population (2020)
  - Total: 1,487
  - Density: 48.6/sq mi (18.8/km^{2})
- Time zone: UTC-5 (Eastern (EST))
  - Summer (DST): UTC-4 (EDT)
- FIPS code: 39-42490
- GNIS feature ID: 1087079

Leesburg Township is one of the fourteen townships of Union County, Ohio, United States. The 2020 census found 1,487 people in the township, 267 of whom lived in the village of Magnetic Springs.

== Geography ==
Located in the eastern part of the county, it borders the following townships:

- Claibourne Township - north
- Thompson Township, Delaware County - northeast
- Scioto Township, Delaware County - southeast
- Dover Township - south
- Paris Township - southwest
- Taylor Township - west

The village of Magnetic Springs is located in northeastern Leesburg Township.

== Name and history ==
Leesburg Township was organized in 1825. It is the only Leesburg Township statewide.

== Government ==
The township is governed by a three-member board of trustees, who are elected in November of odd-numbered years to a four-year term beginning on the following January 1. Two are elected in the year after the presidential election and one is elected in the year before it. There is also an elected township fiscal officer, who serves a four-year term beginning on April 1 of the year after the election, which is held in November of the year before the presidential election. Vacancies in the fiscal officership or on the board of trustees are filled by the remaining trustees.
