= XHVP-FM =

Radio station in Atlixco, Puebla

- Atlixco, Puebla; Mexico
- Frequency: 101.3 FM
- Branding: Sol FM

Programming
- Format: Regional Mexican

Ownership
- Owner: Cinco Radio; (Radio X.H.V.P-FM, S.A. de C.V.)

History
- First air date: July 7, 1981 (concession)

Technical information
- Class: B1
- ERP: 25 kW
- Transmitter coordinates: 18°54′27.8″N 98°26′02.9″W

Links
- Webcast: Listen live
- Website: solfmdigital.com

XHVP-FM is a radio station on 101.3 FM in Atlixco, Puebla. It is owned by Cinco Radio and carries a Regional Mexican format known as Sol FM.

== History ==
XHVP received its concession on July 7, 1981; the station was known as Stereo Sol for many years. It was owned by Felipe Casas Serrano until 2006.

The La Movidita format was born at XEPOP-AM in the city of Puebla in 2004, primarily playing tropical music in Spanish. The name was recycled for XHVP in 2009 and remained in use in Atlixco until the station was relaunched as "Sol FM" on March 17, 2018 with a Regional Mexican format.
