= CKII-FM =

Radio station in Dolbeau-Mistassini, Quebec

- Dolbeau-Mistassini, Quebec; Canada
- Frequency: 101.3 FM

Programming
- Format: community radio

Ownership
- Owner: Alliance Autochtone Local 30 Mistassini

History
- First air date: September 17, 2003

Technical information
- Class: A1
- ERP: 250 watts
- HAAT: 42 metres (138 ft)

CKII-FM is a radio station which broadcasts community radio programming at 101.3 MHz (FM) in Dolbeau-Mistassini, Quebec, Canada.

On June 15, 2001, a local First Nations group, Alliance Autochtone Local 30 Mistassini, won approval of its application by the CRTC. The station originally was licensed to broadcast on 89.9 MHz, but would later relocate to 101.3 MHz, with an effective radiated power of 250 watts. The station would commence broadcasting September 17, 2003. The station's format included programming for the local Innu community from 6 p.m. to 12 midnight, and travelers' information for the Lac-Saint-Jean region at other hours. The station would close in August 2011 after plans to sell the station to a local public access channel, Télévision locale Dolbeau-Mistassini (TVLDM), fell through.

On April 11, 2014, another group, Société d'information Lac-St-Jean, received approval from the CRTC to reactivate 101.3 as a French-language community FM radio station, with an effective radiated power of 395 watts (non-directional antenna with an effective height of antenna above average terrain of 28.2 metres). As part of the license, TVLDM would assist in the operation of the station and the training of the station's employees and volunteers. The station's callsign will be CKIW-FM.
