= XHSCA-FM =

Radio station in Cananea, Sonora

- Cananea, Sonora; Mexico
- Broadcast area: Cananea, Sonora
- Frequency: 93.3 MHz
- Branding: La Consentida

Programming
- Format: Romantic
- Affiliations: Grupo Radio Centro

Ownership
- Owner: Radio Grupo OIR Sonora; (Multifronteras, S.A. de C.V.)

History
- First air date: November 16, 1988 (concession)
- Call sign meaning: Sonora CAnanea

Technical information
- Licensing authority: CRT
- Class: C
- ERP: 15.15 kW
- HAAT: 974.3 m (3,197 ft)

Links
- Website: www.radiogrupooir.com/radiocan/

XHSCA-FM is a radio station on 93.3 FM in Cananea, Sonora, Mexico. It is owned by Radio Grupo OIR Sonora and carries a romantic music format known as La Consentida.

== History ==
XHSCA received its concession on November 16, 1988; the concession was originally awarded to María Trinidad Aguirre Gómez.
