= Dover Township, Union County, Ohio =

Township in Ohio, US

- Township
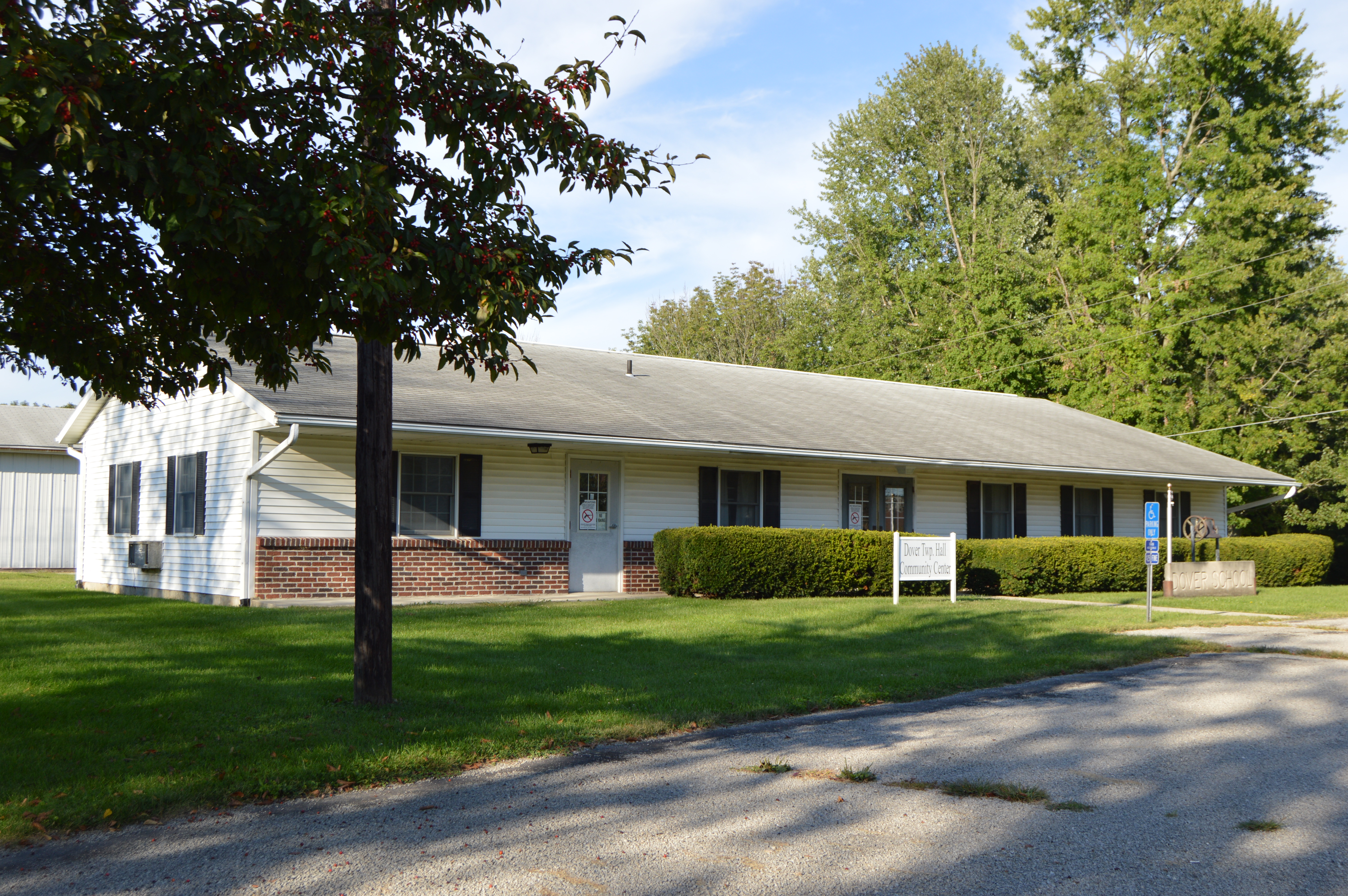
- Township hall in New Dover

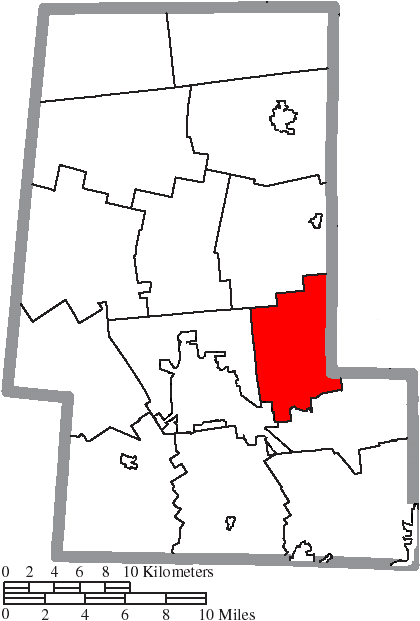
- Location of Dover Township in Union County
- Coordinates: 40°15′42″N 83°17′3″W
- Country: United States
- State: Ohio
- County: Union

Area
  - Total: 22.9 sq mi (59.4 km^{2})
  - Land: 22.9 sq mi (59.4 km^{2})
  - Water: 0 sq mi (0.0 km^{2})
- Elevation: 991 ft (302 m)

Population (2020)
  - Total: 2,326
  - Density: 101/sq mi (39.2/km^{2})
- Time zone: UTC-5 (Eastern (EST))
  - Summer (DST): UTC-4 (EDT)
- FIPS code: 39-22484
- GNIS feature ID: 1087076

Dover Township is one of the fourteen townships of Union County, Ohio, United States. The 2020 census found 2,326 people in the township.

== Geography ==
Located in the eastern part of the county, it borders the following townships:

- Leesburg Township - north
- Scioto Township, Delaware County - east
- Millcreek Township - south
- Paris Township - west

A small part of the city of Marysville, the county seat of Union County, is located in southwestern Dover Township. The unincorporated area of New Dover, Ohio is also located in the township.

== Name and history ==
Statewide, other Dover Townships are located in Athens, Fulton, and Tuscarawas counties.

The township was organized in 1839.

== Government ==
The township is governed by a three-member board of trustees, who are elected in November of odd-numbered years to a four-year term beginning on the following January 1. Two are elected in the year after the presidential election and one is elected in the year before it. There is also an elected township fiscal officer, who serves a four-year term beginning on April 1 of the year after the election, which is held in November of the year before the presidential election. Vacancies in the fiscal officership or on the board of trustees are filled by the remaining trustees.
