= Millcreek Township, Union County, Ohio =

Township in Ohio, US

- Township
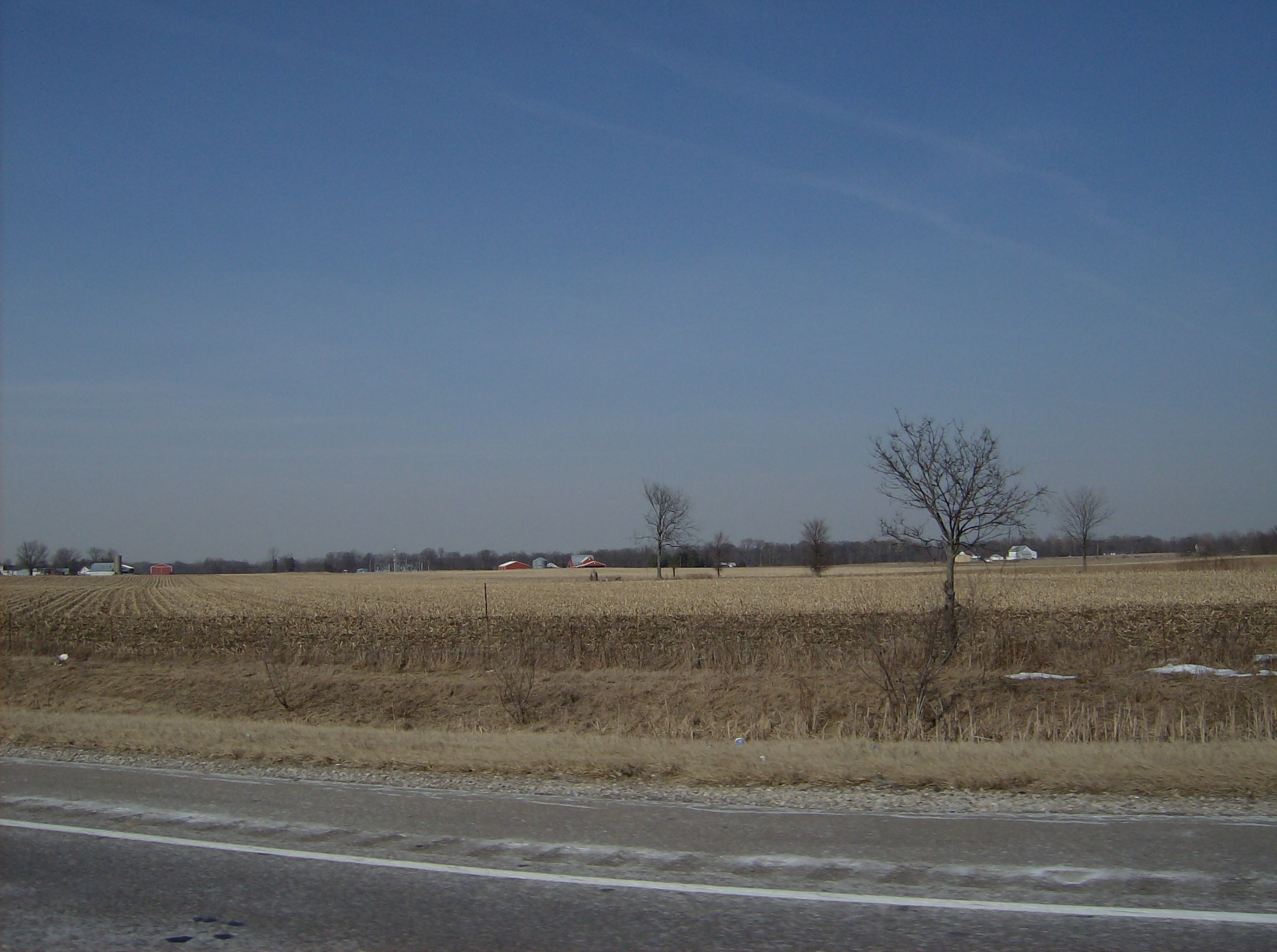
- Farmland along U.S. Route 33

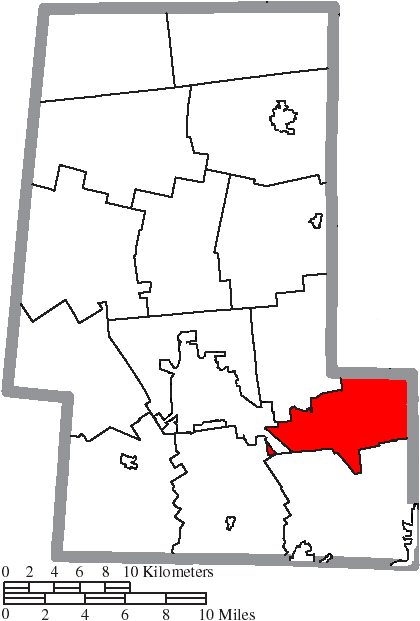
- Location of Millcreek Township in Union County
- Coordinates: 40°13′18″N 83°15′1″W
- Country: United States
- State: Ohio
- County: Union

Area
  - Total: 21.6 sq mi (55.9 km^{2})
  - Land: 21.5 sq mi (55.8 km^{2})
  - Water: 0.039 sq mi (0.1 km^{2})
- Elevation: 974 ft (297 m)

Population (2020)
  - Total: 1,332
  - Density: 62/sq mi (23.9/km^{2})
- Time zone: UTC-5 (Eastern (EST))
  - Summer (DST): UTC-4 (EDT)
- FIPS code: 39-50288
- GNIS feature ID: 1087081

Millcreek Township is one of the fourteen townships of Union County, Ohio, United States. The 2020 census found 1,332 people in the township.

== Geography ==
Located in the southeastern part of the county, it borders the following townships:

- Dover Township - north
- Scioto Township, Delaware County - northeast
- Concord Township, Delaware County - east
- Jerome Township - south
- Darby Township - southwest
- Paris Township - northwest

A small part of the city of Marysville, the county seat of Union County, is located in western Millcreek Township.

== Name and history ==
Millcreek Township was organized in the early 1820s, and named after Mill Creek. It is the only Millcreek Township remaining statewide, after the abolition of the one in Hamilton County, although there are Mill Creek Townships in Coshocton and Williams counties.

== Government ==
The township is governed by a three-member board of trustees, who are elected in November of odd-numbered years to a four-year term beginning on the following January 1. Two are elected in the year after the presidential election and one is elected in the year before it. There is also an elected township fiscal officer, who serves a four-year term beginning on April 1 of the year after the election, which is held in November of the year before the presidential election. Vacancies in the fiscal officership or on the board of trustees are filled by the remaining trustees.
