= WRMS-FM =

Radio station in Beardstown, Illinois

- Beardstown, Illinois; United States
- Frequency: 94.3 MHz
- Branding: WRMS 94.3 FM

Programming
- Format: Country

Ownership
- Owner: LB Sports Productions LLC
- Sister stations: WVIL, WKXQ

Technical information
- Licensing authority: FCC
- Facility ID: 13650
- Class: A
- ERP: 6,000 watts
- HAAT: 91.0 meters (298.6 ft)
- Transmitter coordinates: 40°04′45″N 90°25′59″W

Links
- Public license information: Public file; LMS
- Website: Official website

WRMS-FM (94.3 FM) is a radio station broadcasting a Country music format. Licensed to Beardstown, Illinois, United States. The station is currently owned by LB Sports Productions LLC.
