= Scioto Township, Delaware County, Ohio =

Township in Ohio, US

- Township
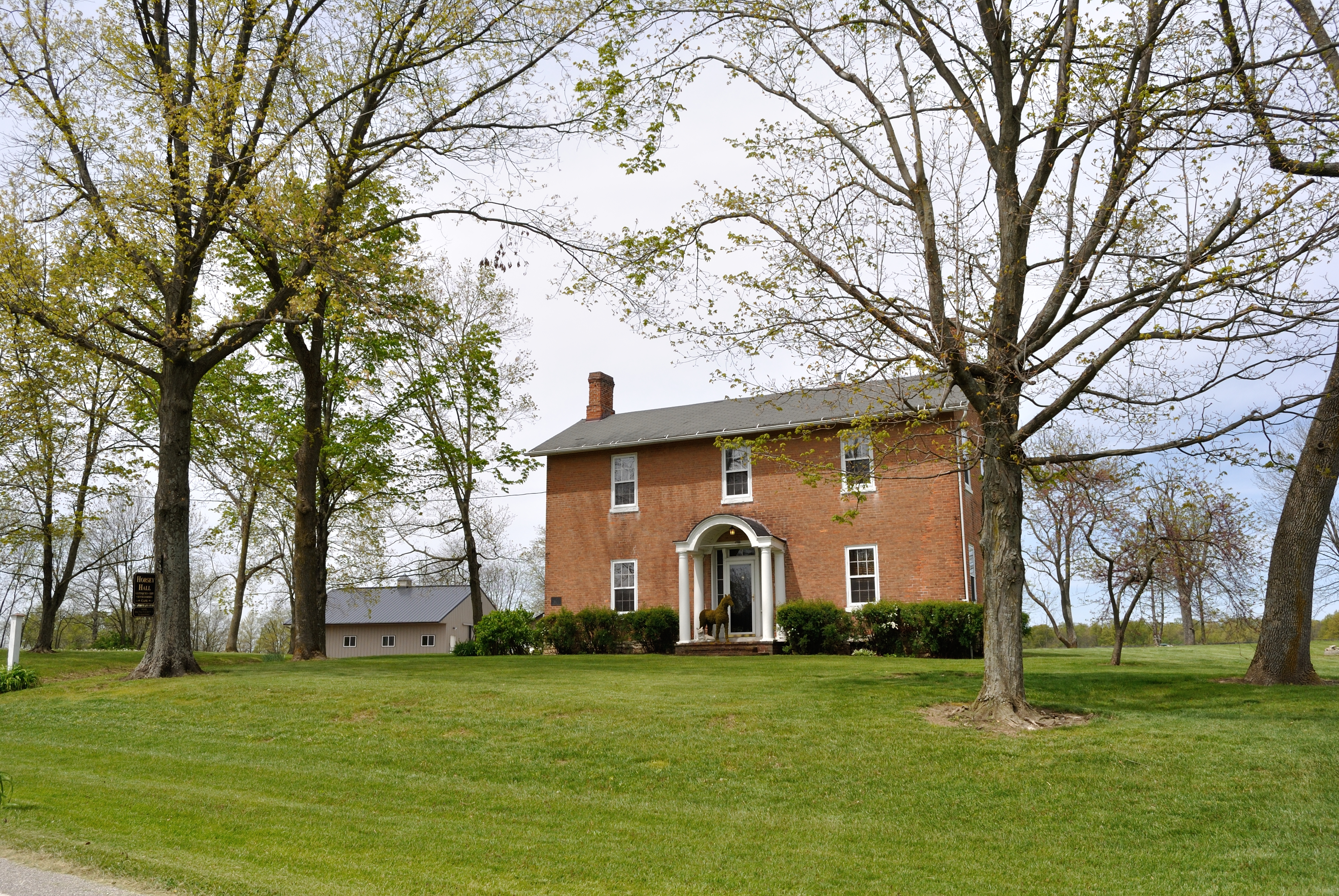
- Felkner-Anderson House

- Location of Scioto Township in Delaware County
- Coordinates: 40°17′7″N 83°12′15″W
- Country: United States
- State: Ohio
- County: Delaware

Area
  - Total: 35.3 sq mi (91.3 km^{2})
  - Land: 34.8 sq mi (90.2 km^{2})
  - Water: 0.46 sq mi (1.2 km^{2})
- Elevation: 942 ft (287 m)

Population (2020)
  - Total: 3,742
  - Density: 107/sq mi (41.5/km^{2})
- Time zone: UTC-5 (Eastern (EST))
  - Summer (DST): UTC-4 (EDT)
- FIPS code: 39-70842
- GNIS feature ID: 1086056
- Website: https://sciototownshipohio.com/

Scioto Township is one of the eighteen townships of Delaware County, Ohio, United States. As of the 2020 census the population was 3,742.

== Geography ==
Located in the western part of the county, it borders the following townships:

- Thompson Township - north
- Radnor Township - northeast
- Delaware Township - east
- Concord Township - southeast
- Millcreek Township, Union County - south
- Dover Township, Union County - southwest
- Leesburg Township, Union County - northwest

The village of Ostrander is located in southwestern Scioto Township.

== Name and history ==
Scioto Township was formed in 1814.

It is one of five Scioto Townships statewide.

== Government ==
The township is governed by a three-member board of trustees, who are elected in November of odd-numbered years to a four-year term beginning on the following January 1. Two are elected in the year after the presidential election and one is elected in the year before it. There is also an elected township fiscal officer, who serves a four-year term beginning on April 1 of the year after the election, which is held in November of the year before the presidential election. Vacancies in the fiscal officership or on the board of trustees are filled by the remaining trustees.
