= XHBN-FM =

Radio station in Ciudad Delicias, Chihuahua

- Ciudad Delicias, Chihuahua; Mexico
- Frequency: 101.3 FM
- Branding: Like

Programming
- Format: Pop

Ownership
- Owner: GRD Multimedia; (Radio Delicias, S.A.)

History
- First air date: January 16, 1952 (concession)

Technical information
- Licensing authority: CRT
- Class: B1
- ERP: 25 kW
- HAAT: 78.03 m (256.0 ft)

Links
- Webcast: Listen live
- Website: likefm.com.mx

XHBN-FM is a radio station on 101.3 FM in Ciudad Delicias, Chihuahua. The station is owned by GRD Multimedia and carries a pop format known as Like.

== History ==
XHBN began as XEBN-AM 1240, receiving its concession on January 16, 1952.

XEBN migrated to FM in 2011.
