= XHEXZ-FM =

Radio station in Zacatecas, Mexico

- Guadalupe/Zacatecas, Zacatecas; Mexico
- Frequency: 93.3 FM
- Branding: Lupe 93.3

Programming
- Format: Regional Mexican

Ownership
- Owner: Grupo Radiofónico ZER; (Raza Publicidad, S.A. de C.V.)

History
- First air date: March 1, 1950 (concession); 2011 (FM)

Technical information
- Licensing authority: CRT
- Class: C1
- ERP: 50 kW
- HAAT: 395.33 m (1,297.0 ft)
- Transmitter coordinates: 22°43′59″N 102°33′00″W

Links
- Webcast: XHEXZ Lupe93.3 Website

XHEXZ-FM is a radio station on 93.3 FM in Zacatecas, Zacatecas. The station is owned by Grupo Radiofónico ZER and is known as Lupe 93.3, carrying a Regional Mexican format.

== History ==
XHEXZ began as XEXZ-AM 1150, with a concession awarded to Edmundo Llamas Félix in March 1950. In the early 2000s, XEXZ was moved to 560.

The station migrated to FM in 2011, initially with an effective radiated power of 3,000 watts, and then increased its power to 50,000 watts several years later. Its FM tower is on Cerro de la Virgen.
