= CKUN-FM =

Coordinates: 44°49′16″N 80°10′25″W

- Christian Island, Ontario; Canada
- Frequency: 101.3 FM

Programming
- Format: community radio

Ownership
- Owner: Chimnissing Communications

History
- First air date: 2002

Technical information
- Class: A
- ERP: 900 watts
- HAAT: 47.6 meters (156 ft)

CKUN-FM is a First Nations/community radio station broadcasting at 101.3 FM in Christian Island, Ontario, Canada. The station began broadcasting in 2002 and is owned by Chimnissing Communications. It is licensed to broadcast until 31st August 2027.
