= Paris Township, Union County, Ohio =

Township in Ohio, US

- Township
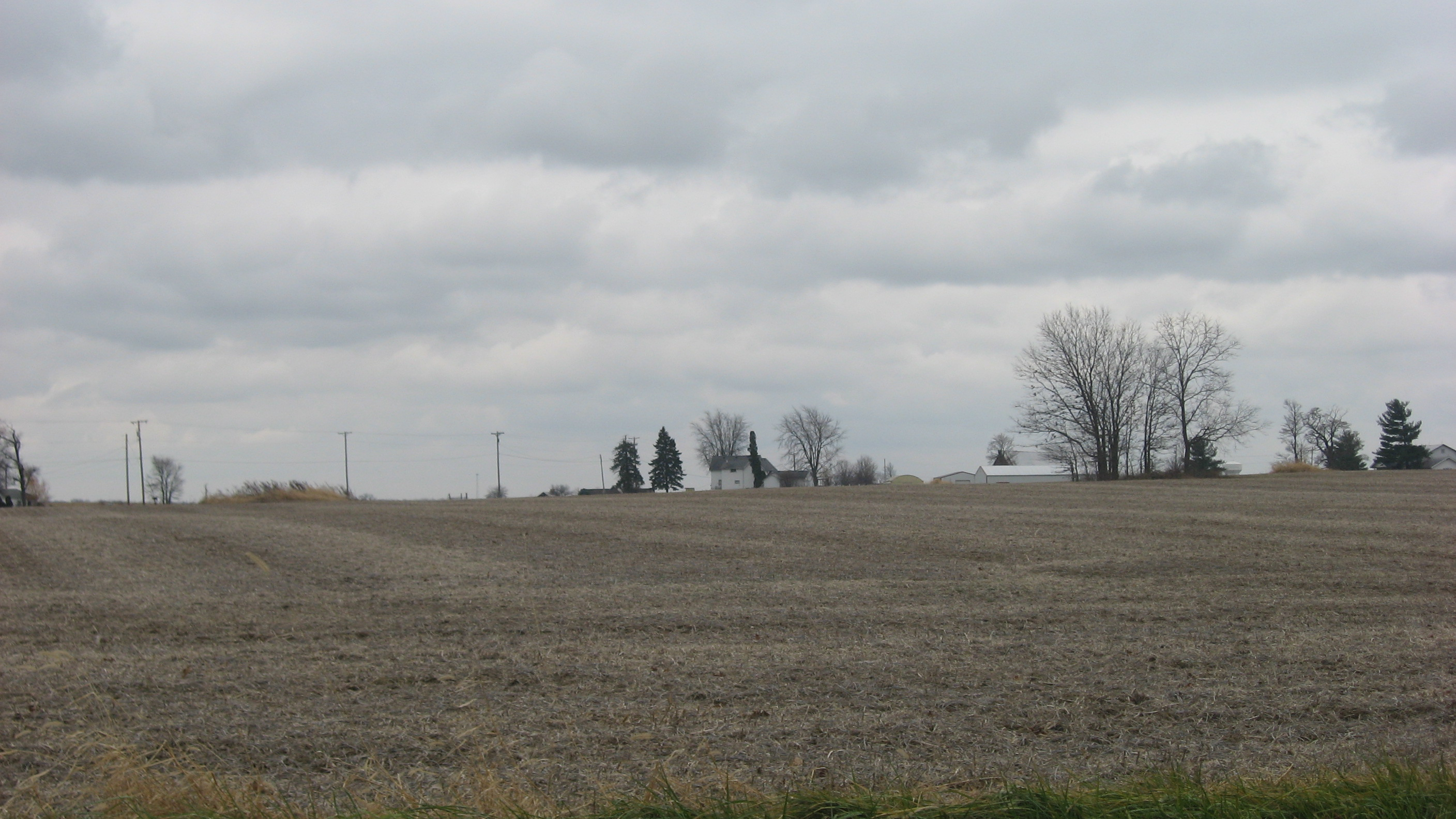
- The Ellis Mounds in the township

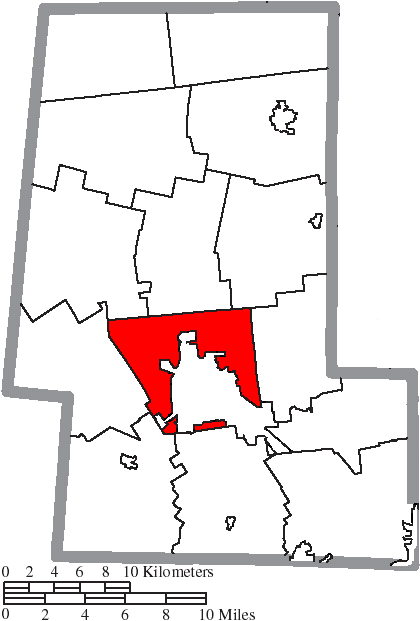
- Location of Paris Township in Union County
- Coordinates: 40°14′23″N 83°22′16″W
- Country: United States
- State: Ohio
- County: Union

Area
  - Total: 36.4 sq mi (94.3 km^{2})
  - Land: 36.3 sq mi (94.0 km^{2})
  - Water: 0.12 sq mi (0.3 km^{2})
- Elevation: 1,004 ft (306 m)

Population (2020)
  - Total: 27,167
  - Density: 750/sq mi (289/km^{2})
- Time zone: UTC-5 (Eastern (EST))
  - Summer (DST): UTC-4 (EDT)
- FIPS code: 39-59864
- GNIS feature ID: 1087082

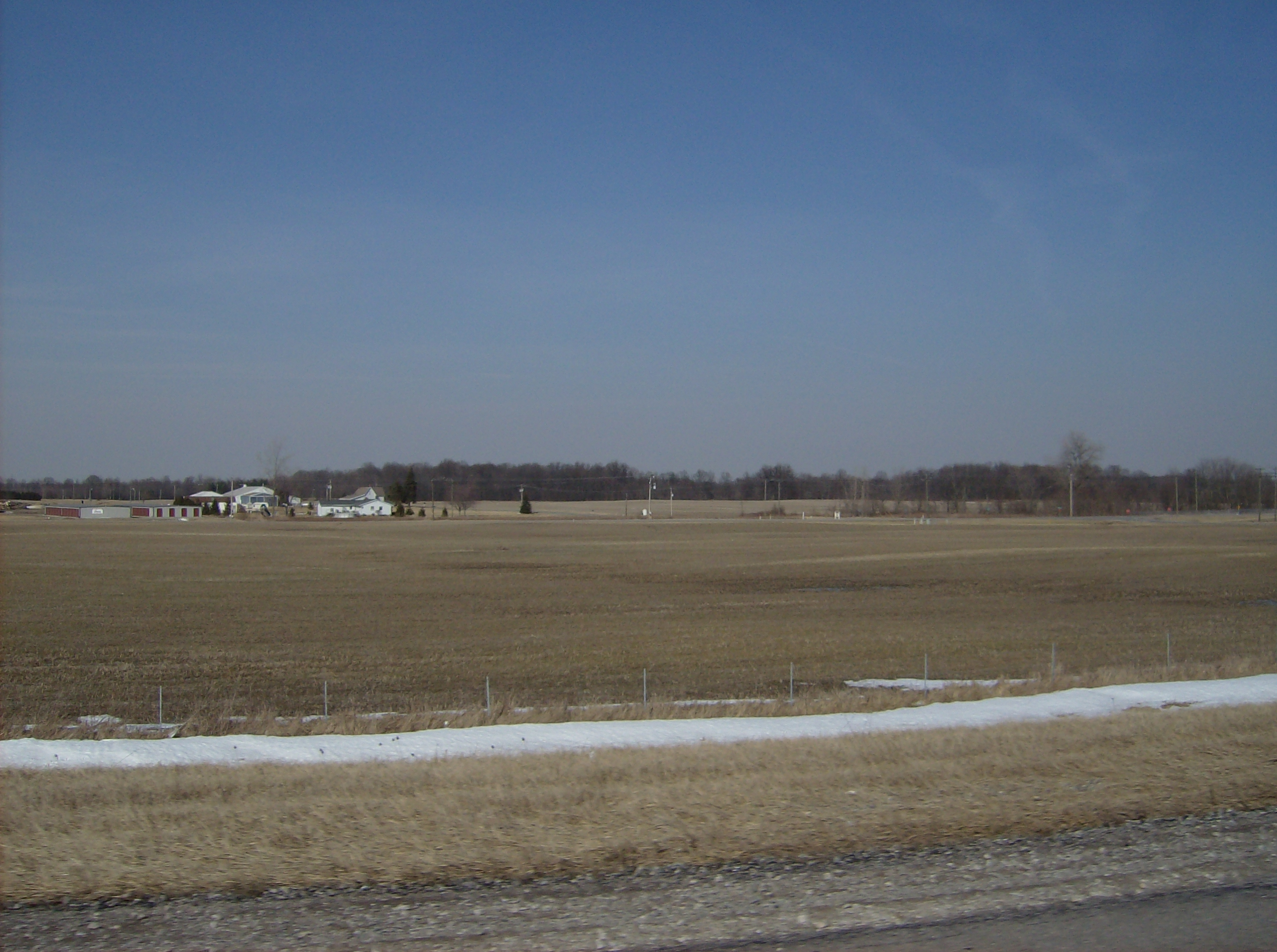
Although Paris Township includes most of Marysville, much of the northern part of township is still farm fields.

Paris Township is one of the fourteen townships of Union County, Ohio, United States. As of the 2020 census, 27,167 people lived in the township.

== Geography ==
Located in the center of the county, Paris Township borders the following townships:

- Taylor Township - north
- Leesburg Township - northeast
- Dover Township - east
- Millcreek Township - southeast
- Darby Township - south
- Union Township - southwest
- Allen Township - west
- Liberty Township - northwest

The majority of the city of Marysville, the county seat of Union County, is located in Paris Township.

== Name and history ==
Paris Township was established in 1821. Statewide, other Paris Townships are located in Portage and Stark counties.

In the Ted Lasso episode "We'll Never Have Paris", Ted references that there are three Parises in Ohio.

== Government ==
The township is governed by a three-member board of trustees, who are elected in November of odd-numbered years to a four-year term beginning on the following January 1. Two are elected in the year after the presidential election and one is elected in the year before it. There is also an elected township fiscal officer, who serves a four-year term beginning on April 1 of the year after the election, which is held in November of the year before the presidential election. Vacancies in the fiscal officership or on the board of trustees are filled by the remaining trustees.
