= XHSCCF-FM =

Community radio station in Tlacolula de Matamoros, Oaxaca, Mexico

- Tlacolula de Matamoros, Oaxaca; Mexico
- Frequency: 93.3 FM
- Branding: Estéreo Guish Bac

Programming
- Format: Community radio

Ownership
- Owner: Fundación Guish Bac, Abriendo los Cielos, A.C.

History
- First air date: November 2018
- Former frequencies: 90.7 FM, 91.7 FM (as a pirate)
- Call sign meaning: (templated call sign)

Technical information
- Class: A
- ERP: 47 watts
- HAAT: −241.2 m (−791 ft)

Links
- Website: www.estereoguishbac.org

XHSCCF-FM is a community radio station on 93.3 FM in Tlacolula de Matamoros, Oaxaca. The station is owned by the civil association Fundación Guish Bac, Abriendo los Cielos, A.C.

== History ==
Fundación Guish Bac filed for a community station on November 30, 2015. The station was awarded on August 8, 2018. Estéreo Guish Bac had been operating as a pirate station since 2015; it relocated to its assigned 93.3 frequency in November 2018.
