= WRPO-LP =

Low-power radio station in Russells Point, Ohio

WRPO-LP and WOHP-LP
WRPO-LP: Russells Point, Ohio; WOHP-LP: Huntsville, Ohio; United States
- Broadcast area: Indian Lake State Park; Logan County
- Frequencies: WRPO-LP: 93.5 MHz; WOHP-LP: 101.3 MHz
- Branding: Indian Lake's Greatest Hits

Programming
- Format: Oldies
- Affiliations: USA Radio Network

Ownership
- Owner: WRPO-LP: Village of Russells Point; WOHP-LP: Village of Huntsville
- Operator: Gray Fox Broadcasting

History
- First air date: WRPO-LP: May 27, 2002; WOHP-LP: August 23, 2014
- Call sign meaning: WRPO-LP: Russells Point, Ohio; WOHP-LP: Ohio's Highest Point

Technical information
- Licensing authority: FCC
- Class: WRPO-LP: L1; WOHP-LP: L1
- ERP: WRPO-LP: 100 watts; WOHP-LP: 100 watts
- HAAT: WRPO-LP: 25.1 meters (82 ft); WOHP-LP: 20.5779 meters (67.513 ft)
- Transmitter coordinates: WRPO-LP: 40°28′5.1″N 83°53′32.7″W; WOHP-LP: 40°26′47″N 83°48′35″W

WRPO-LP (93.5 FM) is a noncommercial low-power radio station licensed to Russells Point, Ohio, with a community radio/oldies format billed as "Indian Lake's Greatest Hits". Owned by the village of Russells Point and operated by Gray Fox Broadcasting with studios and transmitter both located in the village, WRPO-LP serves both it, adjacent Lakeview and Indian Lake State Park.

== History ==
WRPO-LP began broadcasting on May 27, 2002, as an all-volunteer station, with studios and offices are located in the Russells Point Village Municipal Building. Founder and station manager Francis "Gene" Kirby began his broadcast career as a teenager using a low-powered AM band "Oscillator" from his home in New Dover. After graduating from Marysville High School in 1950, he served for nearly ten years in the Air Force, was the evening on-air personality at WRFD-FM (now WNCI) in Columbus, in addition to work at WDLR (now WQCD) in Delaware. Kirby also began operating a Part 15 micropower AM station in Marysville, Ohio, when that city's existing commercial radio station, WUCO, was leased out to noncommercial interests based in Columbus, later managing WUCO after a change in ownership.

The station switched from big band and adult standards to a smooth jazz format on March 8, 2008. Overnight programming also included oldies from 12 midnight until early morning. A survey of local listeners took place in March and April 2009 by the local low-power station which helped determine the switch to oldies on May 9, 2009. In February 2012, a second studio used for audio production and live programs was constructed.

On January 14, 2014, a construction permit was granted by the FCC for WOHP-LP 101.3 mHz in Huntsville. The Village of Huntsville is the station's licensee and Gray Fox Broadcasting also manages this station as a repeater of WRPO-LP. The new low-power FM made its on-air debut at 9:00 am local time on August 23 of 2014 to serve the communities of Huntsville and Bellefontaine. WOHP's transmitting tower was installed with transmitting antennas on June 14, 2014. On July 1, 2014, on-air testing began. A netlink was installed on August 9, 2014 to relay audio from the WRPO studios to the WOHP tower, hence WOHP is a simulcast of WRPO's programming. This station, though, went silent in 2017.

Kirby died on May 30, 2020, at the age of 88. His wife Barbara joined him in eternity on January 4, 2023. Both are interred at Mount Herman Cemetery located near the rural community of New Dover outside of Marysville.

== See also ==
- Indian Lake (Ohio)
- Low power FM
