= XHPNVO-FM =

Radio station in El Salto, Durango, Mexico

- El Salto, Durango (Pueblo Nuevo Municipality); Mexico
- Frequency: 93.3 MHz
- Branding: Ke Buena

Programming
- Format: Regional Mexican
- Affiliations: Radiópolis

Ownership
- Owner: Grupo Promomedios; (GPM Grupo Promomedios Culiacán, S.A. de C.V.)
- Operator: AP Grupo Radio

History
- First air date: April 16, 2018
- Call sign meaning: Location in Pueblo Nuevo Municipality

Technical information
- Licensing authority: CRT
- Class: AA
- ERP: 6 kW
- HAAT: 154.5 m (507 ft)
- Transmitter coordinates: 23°46′04.97″N 105°21′50.75″W

Links
- Website: gpmtuportal.com/la-nueva-93-3-fm-durango/

XHPNVO-FM is a radio station on 93.3 FM in El Salto, Durango, Mexico. It is owned by Grupo Promomedios and operated by AP Grupo Radio, carrying the national Ke Buena format from Radiópolis.

== History ==
XHPNVO was awarded in the IFT-4 radio auction of 2017 and came to air on April 16, 2018, under the name La Nueva. It is the first radio station in El Salto.

In April 2023, the station relaunched as Ke Buena concurrent with the launch by AP Grupo Radio of XHCCAV-FM 94.9 in Durango and XHCCAT-FM 93.7 in Canatlán.
