= KBWD =

- Brownwood, Texas; United States
- Frequency: 1380 kHz
- Branding: Magic 1380

Programming
- Format: Adult contemporary
- Affiliations: SRN News

Ownership
- Owner: Brown County Broadcasting Co.
- Sister stations: KOXE

History
- First air date: 1941
- Call sign meaning: BrownWooD

Technical information
- Licensing authority: FCC
- Facility ID: 7321
- Class: B
- Power: 1,000 watts day 500 watts night
- Transmitter coordinates: 31°42′36″N 98°57′36″W

Links
- Public license information: Public file; LMS
- Webcast: Listen live
- Website: koxe.com

KBWD (1380 AM, "Magic 1380") is a radio station licensed to serve Brownwood, Texas, United States. It was launched in 1941 as the first radio station in Brownwood. The station is currently owned by the Brown County Broadcasting Company.

KBWD broadcasts an adult contemporary music format, including some programming from SRN News.

== In popular culture ==
The station is featured in a music video by Coffey Anderson titled "15 Minutes".
