= XHACC-FM =

Radio station in Puerto Escondido, Oaxaca

Puerto Escondido, Oaxaca; Mexico
- Frequency: 93.3 FM
- Branding: La Voz del Puerto

Ownership
- Owner: Radio Solución, S.A. de C.V.

History
- First air date: April 10, 1979 (concession)

Technical information
- ERP: 25 kW
- Transmitter coordinates: 15°50′56″N 97°02′48″W

Links
- Webcast: Listen live
- Website: 933.com.mx

XHACC-FM is a radio station on 93.3 FM in Puerto Escondido, Oaxaca, known as La Voz del Puerto.

== History ==
XEACC-AM 870 received its concession on April 10, 1979. It was owned by Miguel Olvera Monroy until 2005.

XEACC received approval to migrate to FM in May 2013.
