= XHIW-FM =

Radio station in Uruapan, Michoacán

Uruapan, Michoacán; Mexico
- Frequency: 101.3 FM
- Branding: Canal Juvenil

Programming
- Format: Pop

Ownership
- Owner: Grupo Radio FyL, S.A. de C.V.

History
- First air date: October 15, 1964 (concession)

Technical information
- ERP: 25 kW
- Transmitter coordinates: 19°25′23.3″N 102°02′08.1″W

XHIW-FM is a radio station on 101.3 FM in Uruapan, Michoacán, Mexico.

== History ==
XEIW-AM 1160 received its concession on October 15, 1964. The station was owned by Vita López de Flores and operated as a daytimer with 1,000 watts. The Flores and López families transferred the concession to a group named for them — Grupo Radio FyL — in 2006. It migrated to FM in 2011.
