= WFAQ-LP =

- (old frequency logo)
- Mukwonago, Wisconsin; United States
- Frequency: 101.3 MHz
- Branding: The Nation's Music Source

Programming
- Format: Freeform

Ownership
- Owner: Kettle Moraine Community Radio, Inc.

History
- First air date: December 12, 2007
- Former frequencies: 92.9 MHz (2007–2015)

Technical information
- Licensing authority: FCC
- Facility ID: 131376
- Class: L1
- ERP: 100 watts
- HAAT: 30.9 meters (101 ft)
- Transmitter coordinates: 42°46′8.00″N 88°37′30.00″W
- Repeater: none

Links
- Public license information: LMS
- Website: www.wfaq.com

WFAQ-LP (101.3 FM) is a radio station licensed to Mukwonago, Wisconsin, United States. The station is currently owned by Kettle Moraine Community Radio, Inc.

The station features the tagline “The Nation’s Music Source” with programming that is continuous, minimally-interrupted music and occasional DJs. It banks on its vast library (over 100k titles) of independent and local artists and bands collected over three decades. The station also features the locally produced Deke Marler “Musictime USNA” program, and in the past, “The Sara Schultz Show”; a politically progressive, Wisconsin-only radio talk show (Sundays 8AM-10AM). They also feature the Suspense radio theatre program, Sundays 8PM-8:30PM.

On November 16, 2014, the station began streaming audio and can be found on the Shoutcast server.

On March 31, 2015, the station changed its broadcasting frequency from 92.9 MHz to 101.3 MHz due to conflicting interference from other stations, notably KATF (92.9 FM, Dubuque, IA). This change was approved by the FCC.
