= XHFX-FM =

Radio station in Guaymas, Sonora, Mexico

XHFX-FM, XEFX-AM
- Guaymas, Sonora; Mexico
- Frequency: 101.3 FM / 630 AM
- Branding: Amor 101

Programming
- Format: Romantic

Ownership
- Owner: Grupo ASVA Comunicaciones; (Criman Comunicaciones, S.A. de C.V.)

History
- First air date: March 31, 1955 (concession)

Technical information
- Licensing authority: CRT
- Class: B1 (FM); C (AM)
- Power: 1 kW day/0.25 kW night
- ERP: 1.2 kW
- HAAT: 441.1 m (1,447 ft)
- Transmitter coordinates: 27°56′33.9″N 110°54′13.1″W

Links
- Webcast: radioenvivo.com.mx/web/684-amor-101.html
- Website: amor101.com

XHFX-FM is a radio station on 101.3 FM in Guaymas, Sonora, Mexico, also broadcasting on XEFX-AM 630. It is owned by Radio Sonora, S.A. and is known as Amor 101 with a romantic format.

== History ==
XEFX-AM 630 received its concession on March 31, 1955. The 250-watt station was owned by José Ramos Regalado and Guillermo Acosta Ochoa. In 1967, XEFX was sold to Radio Sonora, S.A., and in the 1980s, XEFX increased daytime power to a full kilowatt.

Former logo

XEFX migrated to FM in 2010 as XHFX-FM 101.3. It remains on air because five people would lose all radio service were it to close, per a 2018 IFT study.
