= WXJK =

- Farmville, Virginia; United States
- Broadcast area: Farmville, Virginia; Crewe, Virginia; Dillwyn, Virginia; Cumberland, Virginia
- Frequency: 101.3 MHz
- Branding: 101.3 FM The X

Programming
- Format: Classic rock

Ownership
- Owner: David W. Layne

History
- First air date: July 12, 1990
- Call sign meaning: We eXalt Jesus King

Technical information
- Licensing authority: FCC
- Facility ID: 15825
- Class: A
- Power: 6,000 watts
- HAAT: 100 meters
- Transmitter coordinates: 37°19′23.0″N 78°23′23.0″W

Links
- Public license information: Public file; LMS
- Webcast: WXJK Webstream

WXJK is a classic rock formatted broadcast radio station licensed to Farmville, Virginia, serving the Farmville/Crewe/Dillwyn/Cumberland area. WXJK is owned and operated by David W. Layne.
