= KFPP-LP =

- Woodward, Oklahoma; United States
- Broadcast area: Woodward, Oklahoma
- Frequency: 93.3 MHz

Programming
- Format: Catholic

Ownership
- Owner: Woodward Catholic Radio, Inc.

History
- First air date: 2017

Technical information
- Licensing authority: FCC
- Facility ID: 195626
- Class: LP1
- ERP: 100 watts
- HAAT: −10.3 meters (−34 ft)
- Transmitter coordinates: 36°26′3″N 99°24′20″W

Links
- Public license information: LMS
- Website: http://www.okcr.org

KFPP-LP (93.3 FM) is a low-power FM radio station licensed to Woodward, Oklahoma, United States. The station is currently owned by Woodward Catholic Radio, Inc.

== History ==
The station call sign KFPP-LP on January 26, 2017.
