= KBHR =

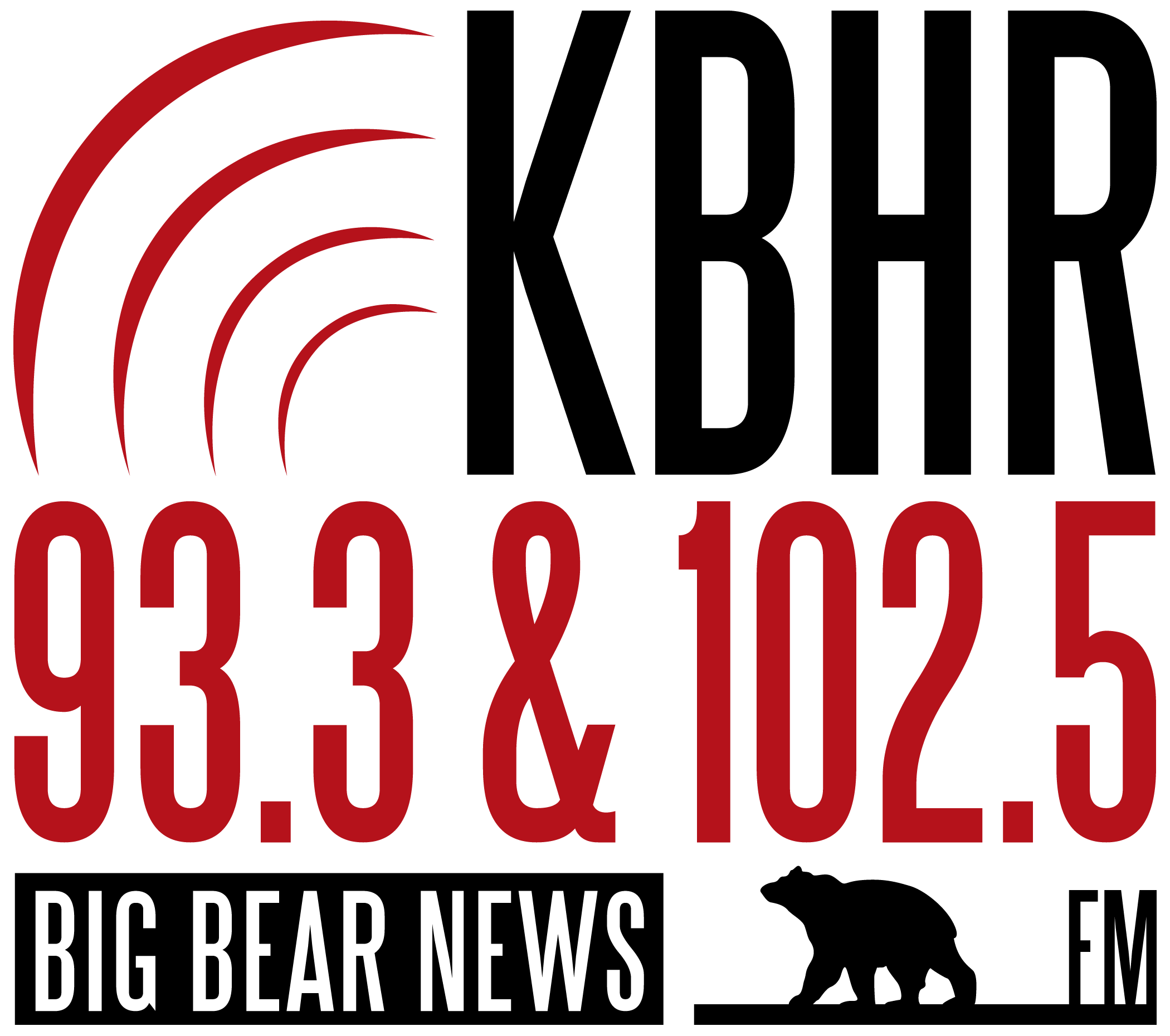
- Big Bear City, California; United States
- Frequency: 93.3 MHz
- Branding: K-BEAR

Programming
- Format: Adult Album Alternative

Ownership
- Owner: Parallel Broadcasting, Inc

History
- First air date: 1995
- Call sign meaning: K-Bear (station branding)

Technical information
- Licensing authority: FCC
- Class: A
- ERP: 1,300 watts directional
- HAAT: 214 meters
- Transmitter coordinates: 34.278°N 116.793°W
- Translator: 102.5 K273CO (Big Bear City)

Links
- Public license information: Public file; LMS
- Website: www.kbhr933.com

KBHR is a commercial radio station located in Big Bear City, California, broadcasting at 93.3 FM. KBHR airs an Adult Album Alternative music format branded as "K-BEAR, The Bear is Everwhere".

This station has a translator at 102.5 FM.

== History ==
KBHR first received its construction permit in 1991, which called for a new station on 93.3 FM. At the time, it was due to go on-air in 1994, however, the owners negotiated for extensions, which lasted through 1995, when program testing began. The station officially received its broadcast license in spring 1996, with KBHR officially signing on on April 11 of that year. The stations has kept the same KBHR call letters throughout its history.

For much of its existence, KBHR has been programmed as an Adult Album Alternative station, and is one of few said stations in California.

== Transmission power ==
KBHR broadcasts at 93.3 FM, with a 1.3 kW directional transmitter. Most of the signal has been aimed at the Victor Valley. It cannot broadcast south into San Bernardino. This is in an effort to avoid co-channel interference with KHTS-FM, a CHR station in distant El Cajon, and also the dominant station at 93.3 FM, although that station cannot be heard further north than Wildomar.

To solve this problem, a translator has been set up at 102.5, which is aimed towards Palm Springs.

== In popular culture ==
KBHR were also the call letters of the 570AM radio station in the fictitious town of Cicely, Alaska, on the CBS television dramedy Northern Exposure.

KBHR 570 am is an online radio station. It is a tribute to the fictional radio station from Northern Exposure. www.kbhr570.com
