= KJSO-LP =

KJSO
- Omaha, Nebraska; United States
- Broadcast area: Northern Omaha
- Frequency: 101.3 MHz

Programming
- Format: Hip hop

Ownership
- Owner: North Omaha Loves Jazz Cultural Arts and Humanities Complex

History
- First air date: 2017

Technical information
- Licensing authority: FCC
- Facility ID: 196809
- Class: L1
- ERP: 11 watts
- HAAT: 45.11 metres (148 ft)
- Transmitter coordinates: 41°17′13″N 96°00′15″W

Links
- Public license information: Public file; LMS
- Website: Official website

KJSO-LP (101.3 FM) is a low power radio station broadcasting a hip hop format. The station is operated by North Omaha Loves Jazz Cultural Arts and Humanities Complex. The station serves Omaha. The station shares airtime and a transmitter with KXNB-LP, another low power FM station, also located on 101.3 FM. The station held a ribbon cutting ceremony in February 2017.
