= XHBW-FM =

Radio station in Chihuahua, Chihuahua

- Chihuahua, Chihuahua; Mexico
- Broadcast area: Chihuahua
- Frequency: 93.3 FM (HD Radio)
- Branding: Magia Digital 93.3

Programming
- Format: regional Mexican

Ownership
- Owner: MegaRadio; (Radiofónica XEBW del Norte, S.A. de C.V.)

History
- First air date: October 14, 1938 (concession)

Technical information
- Licensing authority: CRT
- Class: B
- ERP: 25,000 watts
- HAAT: 104.11 m (341.6 ft)
- Transmitter coordinates: 28°36′07″N 106°08′19″W

Links
- Website: magiadigital933.fm

XHBW-FM is a radio station on 93.3 FM in Chihuahua, Chihuahua. It is owned by MegaRadio and carries its Magia Digital format.

== History ==
XEBW-AM on 1280 kHz received its concession on October 14, 1938. Owned by Radio Emisora del Norte, S. de R.L., the station changed concessionaires in 2010 and migrated to FM in 2011.
