= WAGX =

- Manchester, Ohio; United States
- Frequency: 101.3 MHz
- Branding: 101.3 Hank FM

Programming
- Format: Classic country

Ownership
- Owner: Jewell Schaeffer Broadcasting Co.

History
- First air date: 1992

Technical information
- Licensing authority: FCC
- Facility ID: 31113
- Class: A
- ERP: 3,000 watts
- HAAT: 91 meters (299 ft)
- Transmitter coordinates: 38°36′3.2″N 83°40′21.7″W

Links
- Public license information: Public file; LMS
- Webcast: Listen live
- Website: WAGX Online

WAGX (101.3 FM) is a radio station that is broadcasting a classic country music format. The station is licensed to Manchester, Ohio, United States, with studios in Maysville, Kentucky. It is owned by Jewell Schaeffer Broadcasting Co. WAGX is licensed as a Class A FM station projecting 3,000 watts of effective radiated power. Its antenna pattern is non-directional and is located in Plumville, Kentucky. WAGX went on the air in 1992 as an oldies station; it subsequently evolved to classic hits before suspending operations in 2024.

== History ==
The station was founded by Maysville native and local county sheriff Garey A. Beckett and longtime friend James P. Wagner, a shareholder in Jacor. Other principals of Jewell Schaeffer Broadcasting included Jay R. Langenbahn, Jewell G. Schaeffer, Ronald D. Stiles, and Gilbert E. Mitchell. The company filed an application to build a station on 101.3 MHz in Manchester on February 23, 1989, and was granted the construction permit on April 22, 1991; the WAGX call sign was assigned that June. It went on the air in 1992 as an oldies station.

Jewell Schaeffer Broadcasting took WAGX silent on or around May 20, 2024, after James Wagner was forced to step away from his duties as owner and general manager while battling Alzheimer's disease. By the time of the closure, WAGX's format had shifted to classic hits. Jewell Schaeffer initially surrendered the WAGX license to the Federal Communications Commission in early 2025; the license was subsequently reinstated, with the company instead requesting a transfer to conservator Jami Bien while seeking a buyer for the station.

On May 6, 2025, WAGX returned to the air with a classic country format, branded as "101.3 Hank FM".
