= KUKE-LP =

- Kula, Hawaii; United States
- Frequency: 101.3 MHz
- Branding: The Living Word Radio

Programming
- Format: Worship music

Ownership
- Owner: Calvary Chapel Upcountry

Technical information
- Licensing authority: FCC
- Facility ID: 196271
- Class: LP1
- ERP: 100 watts
- HAAT: 0 metres (0 ft)
- Transmitter coordinates: 20°45′16.4″N 156°19′29.8″W

Links
- Public license information: LMS
- Website: www.lwrmaui.com

KUKE-LP (101.3 FM, "The Living Word Radio") is a radio station licensed to serve the community of Kula, Hawaii. The station is owned by Calvary Chapel Upcountry and airs a worship music format.

The station was assigned the KUKE-LP call letters by the Federal Communications Commission on August 7, 2014.
