= KLWA =

- Westport, Washington; United States
- Frequency: 101.3 MHz
- Branding: K-Love

Programming
- Affiliations: K-Love

Ownership
- Owner: Educational Media Foundation

History
- Call sign meaning: K-Love WAshington

Technical information
- Licensing authority: FCC
- Facility ID: 164150
- Class: A
- ERP: 4,000 watts
- HAAT: 49 meters (161 ft)
- Transmitter coordinates: 46°53′4″N 124°0′44″W

Links
- Public license information: Public file; LMS
- Website: klove.com

KLWA (101.3 FM) is a radio station licensed to Westport, Washington, United States. The station is owned by Educational Media Foundation.

While still licensed, the station went off the air in 2008, but returned in August 2012.
