= WHJG-LP =

- Rockford, Illinois; United States
- Broadcast area: Rockford, Illinois; Cherry Valley, Illinois; Valley View, Illinois
- Frequency: 93.3 MHz
- Branding: 93.3 WHJG

Programming
- Language: English
- Format: Christian talk and teaching

Ownership
- Owner: Pelley Road Christian Fellowship

History
- First air date: 2005

Technical information
- Licensing authority: FCC
- Facility ID: 126983
- Class: L1
- ERP: 100 watts
- HAAT: 28.6 meters (94 ft)
- Transmitter coordinates: 42°15′23″N 88°58′45″W

Links
- Public license information: LMS
- Webcast: Listen Live
- Website: whjg933fm.com

WHJG-LP (93.3 FM) is an American low-power FM radio station licensed to serve the community of Rockford, Illinois. The station, established in 2005, is owned and operated as a ministry of the Pelley Road Christian Fellowship.

== Programming ==
WHJG-LP broadcasts a Christian talk and teaching format to the Rockford/Cherry Valley/Valley View area. Some featured hosts and teachers include Charles Stanley, Chuck Swindoll, Adrian Rogers, Keith Moore, Jay Sekulow, Joyce Meyer, Mark Hankins, and Billye Brim.

== History ==
In September 2000, Pelley Road Christian Fellowship applied to the Federal Communications Commission (FCC) for a construction permit for a new low-power broadcast radio station to serve Rockford, Illinois. The FCC granted this permit on May 19, 2003, with a scheduled expiration date of November 19, 2004. The new station was assigned call sign "WHJG-LP" on June 24, 2003. After construction and testing were completed in November 2004, the station was granted its broadcast license on May 19, 2005.
