= WPLP-LP =

- Athens, Georgia; United States
- Broadcast area: Metro Athens
- Frequency: 93.3 MHz
- Branding: Bulldog 93.3

Programming
- Format: Alternative rock

Ownership
- Owner: Paul Francis

History
- First air date: February 20, 2014

Technical information
- Licensing authority: FCC
- Facility ID: 193254
- Class: L1
- ERP: 100 watts
- HAAT: 29.3 meters (96 ft)
- Transmitter coordinates: 33°57′32.70″N 83°22′31.60″W

Links
- Public license information: LMS
- Webcast: Listen live
- Website: bulldogathens.com

WPLP-LP ("Bulldog 93.3") is a radio station licensed to Athens, Georgia, United States that airs an alternative rock format. The station's slogan is The Sound of Athens. The station was started by Paul Francis and began as a not-for-profit, grassroots station. The station operates from the Fred Building on College Avenue in downtown Athens. The station plays limited commercials. The station is known for encouraging local music and musicians by asking for submissions of local music and playing the song of the winner of the Athens Area High School Battle of the Bands.

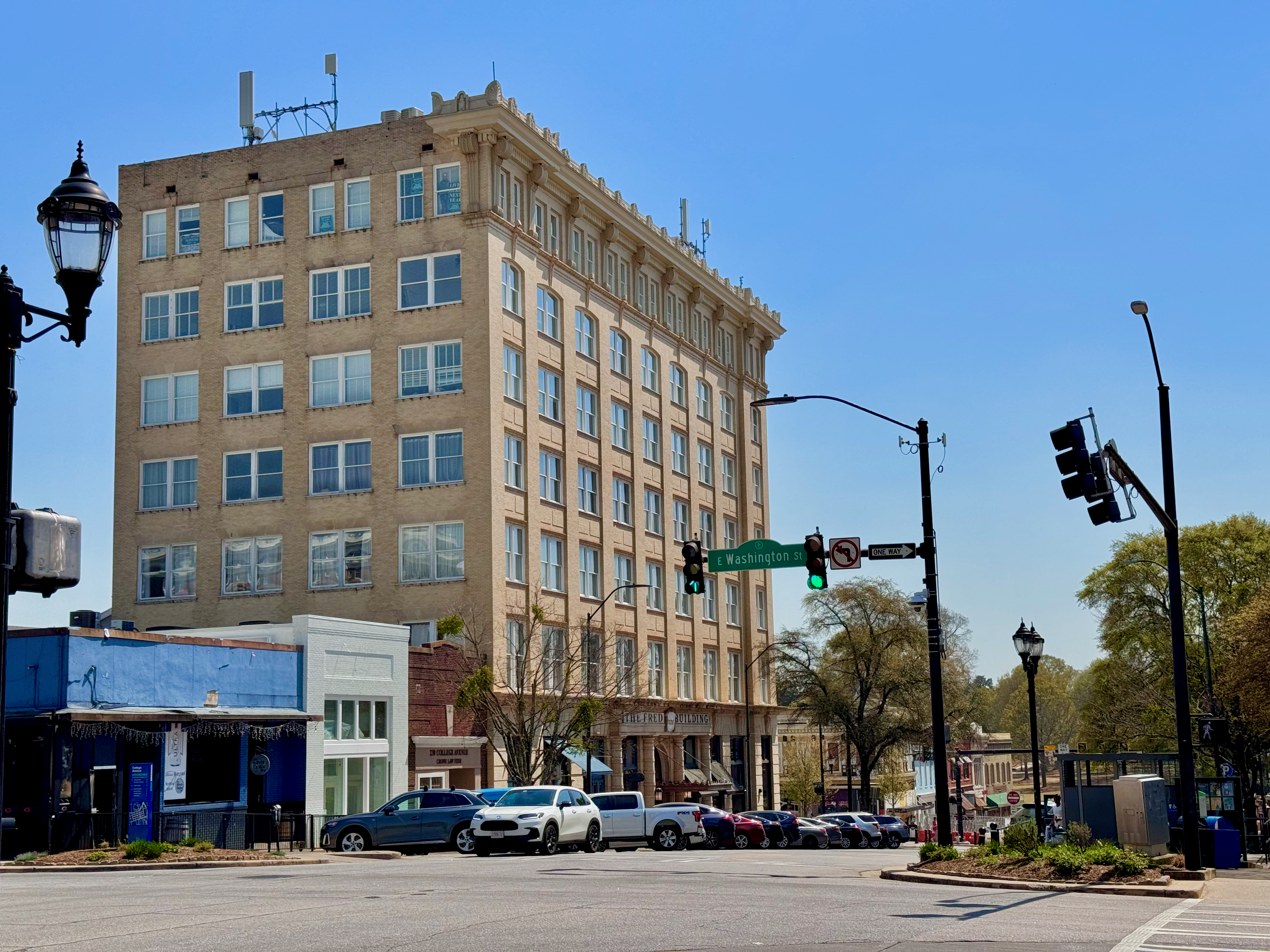
WPLP-LP operates from the Fred Building in downtown Athens

Bulldog 93.3 was criticized by Athens community members in February 2018 for owner Paul Francis' response to an advertising request from the United Campus Workers of Georgia.

In January 2021, the station was fined $10,000, after admitting to airing commercials with prohibited promotional language.
