= CICH-FM =

Radio station in Nunavut, Canada

Coordinates: 63°20′15″N 090°42′34″W

CICH-FM is a community radio station that broadcasts at 93.3 FM in Chesterfield Inlet, Nunavut, Canada.

The station is owned by Chesterfield Inlet Radio Society.
