= KOXE =

Coordinates: 31.7187°N 98.9794°W

- Brownwood, Texas; United States
- Frequency: 101.3 MHz
- Branding: KOXE 101.3 fm

Programming
- Format: Country
- Affiliations: SRN News

Ownership
- Owner: Brown County Broadcasting Co.
- Sister stations: KBWD

History
- First air date: May 17, 1975

Technical information
- Licensing authority: FCC
- Facility ID: 7320
- Class: C1
- ERP: 100,000 watts
- HAAT: 176 meters (577 ft)

Links
- Public license information: Public file; LMS
- Webcast: Listen live
- Website: koxe.com

KOXE (101.3 FM) is a radio station airing a country music format licensed to Brownwood, Texas. The station is owned by Brown County Broadcasting Co.
