= WZFM =

Former radio station in Narrows, Virginia

- Narrows, Virginia; United States
- Broadcast area: Narrows, Virginia; Giles County, Virginia
- Frequency: 101.3 MHz
- Branding: Classic Hits Z101.3

Programming
- Format: Classic hits
- Affiliations: ABC Radio News; Classic Hits (Cumulus Media); Virginia Sports Network

Ownership
- Owner: Baker Family Stations; (WZFM, LLC)

History
- First air date: 1991

Technical information
- Licensing authority: FCC
- Facility ID: 50236
- Class: A
- Power: 210 watts
- HAAT: 366 meters
- Transmitter coordinates: 37°17′54.0″N 80°48′36.0″W

Links
- Public license information: Public file; LMS

WZFM (101.3 FM, "Z101.3") is a classic hits-formatted broadcast radio station licensed to Narrows, Virginia, serving Narrows and Giles County, Virginia. WZFM is owned and operated by Baker Family Stations.
