= WXLN-LP =

- Shelbyville, Kentucky; United States
- Frequency: 93.3 MHz
- Branding: Power 93.3 WXLN

Programming
- Format: Religious

Ownership
- Owner: Bullock's Christian Broadcasting Corporation

Technical information
- Licensing authority: FCC
- Facility ID: 135254
- Class: L1
- ERP: 100 watts
- HAAT: 25.1 meters
- Transmitter coordinates: 38°12′31.00″N 85°12′6.00″W

Links
- Public license information: LMS
- Webcast: Listen live
- Website: wxlnradio.com

WXLN-LP (93.3 FM) is a radio station licensed to Shelbyville, Kentucky, United States. The station is currently owned by Bullock's Christian Broadcasting Corporation.
