= WTRH =

Coordinates: 39°8′6.2″N 89°6′2.3″W

- Ramsey, Illinois; United States
- Broadcast area: Vandalia, Illinois
- Frequency: 93.3 MHz
- Branding: WTRH 93.3 FM

Programming
- Format: News/talk

Ownership
- Owner: Countryside Broadcasting, Inc.

History
- First air date: 1991

Technical information
- Licensing authority: FCC
- Facility ID: 14071
- Class: A
- ERP: 3,000 watts
- HAAT: 142 meters (466 ft)

Links
- Public license information: Public file; LMS
- Webcast: Listen live
- Website: wtrhradio.com

WTRH 93.3 FM is a radio station broadcasting a news talk format. Licensed to Ramsey, Illinois, United States, the station serves the Vandalia, Illinois area, and is owned by Countryside Broadcasting.

WTRH also airs oldies music on Saturdays, along with old time radio, and airs gospel music on Sundays along with religious programming.
