= KRNG =

Radio station in Fallon–Reno, Nevada

Coordinates: 39.708°N 119.172°W

- Fallon, Nevada; United States
- Broadcast area: Reno, Nevada
- Frequency: 101.3 (MHz)
- Branding: The Biggest Little Radio

Programming
- Format: Hot adult contemporary

Ownership
- Owner: Juan C. Rodriguez

History
- First air date: 1997
- Call sign meaning: K Re Ne Gade (previous format)

Technical information
- Licensing authority: FCC
- Facility ID: 60327
- Class: C2
- ERP: 1,650 watts
- HAAT: 673 meters (2,208 ft)

Links
- Public license information: Public file; LMS
- Website: biggestlittleradio.com

KRNG is a commercial radio station located in Fallon, Nevada, broadcasting to the Reno, Nevada area on 101.3 FM. KRNG airs a Hot AC music format branded as "The Biggest Little Radio".

== History ==
101.3 MHz in Fallon, Nevada went on air in 1997 Broadcasting a Christian Rock format. The station was branded as Renegade Radio and it was owned by Sierra Nevada Christian Music Association. On May 5, 2021, the frequency was bought by Juan C. Rodriguez and subsequently shifted its programming format to Hot Adult Contemporary (Hot AC), adopting the new branding of "The Biggest Little Radio," a name inspired by Reno, Nevada's long-standing nickname, "The Biggest Little City in the World"

== Booster ==
KRNG is rebroadcast on the following FM booster:

Call sign	Frequency	City of license	FID	ERP (W)	HAAT	Class	FCC info
KRNG-FM1	101.3 FM	Reno, Nevada	90322	120	696 m (2,283 ft)	D	LMS
