= KMMZ =

Coordinates: 31.684°N 102.321°W

- Crane, Texas; United States
- Broadcast area: Midland-Odessa
- Frequency: 101.3 MHz
- Branding: La Caliente 101.3

Programming
- Format: Regional Mexican

Ownership
- Owner: Maria Teresa and Humberto Jimenez; (Permian Basin Broadcasting, LLC)

History
- First air date: 1995 (as KXXL)
- Former call signs: KAIR (1989–1994, CP); KZNY (3/1994-11/1994, CP); KXXL (1994–1998); KKKK (1998–2004); KLJF (7/1/2004-7/16/2004)
- Call sign meaning: MeMories (previous format)

Technical information
- Licensing authority: FCC
- Facility ID: 46426
- Class: C1
- ERP: 100,000 watts
- HAAT: 148 meters

Links
- Public license information: Public file; LMS
- Website: lacaliente1013.com

KMMZ (101.3 FM, "La Caliente 101.3") is an American radio station licensed by the Federal Communications Commission (FCC) to serve Crane, Texas, which is part of the Midland–Odessa metropolitan area. KMMZ is owned by Maria Teresa and Humberto Jimenez, through licensee Permian Basin Broadcasting, LLC.

Formerly an adult standards station known as "Memories 101.3," the current Regional Mexican music format began in early 2007.
