= CFXU-FM =

Radio station in Nova Scotia, Canada

Coordinates: 45°37′10″N 61°59′40″W

- Antigonish, Nova Scotia; Canada
- Broadcast area: Antigonish County
- Frequency: 93.3 MHz
- Branding: The Fox

Programming
- Format: Campus radio

Ownership
- Owner: Radio CFXU Club

History
- First air date: Early 2000s (origins go back to the 1970s)
- Call sign meaning: St. Francis Xavier University

Links
- Website: radiocfxu.ca

CFXU-FM, branded as The Fox, is a radio station broadcasting at 93.3 FM in Antigonish, Nova Scotia, Canada. It is the campus radio station of St. Francis Xavier University.

== History ==
The station was conceived in 1969 by several students who used a home built 5 watt AM transmitter kit (Heathkit) to broadcast out of the common room of Fraser House (Bishop's Hall). Amateur announcers spun their own records on a simple turntable and microphone system. The station was called VOX (Voice Of Xavier). The pirate radio station featured volunteer announcers offering a rock format. VOX was extremely popular with the student body and could be picked up on car and home radios in the Antigonish town area. The success of VOX sparked interest in establishing a more formal and funded "radio" station. CRTC licensing issues prevented a higher power transmitter being utilized hence the pirate format was abandoned in favor of a wired residence speaker system. Used turntables and broadcast quality microphones were acquired and a functioning broadcast studio was built in the basement of the old Student Union building (The Old Chapel next to Mockler Hall). Radio St F.X. began closed circuit broadcast in 1970. Radio St.F.X. was a voice for student opinion, popular music and had a major role in campus politics of the era. The broadcast studio was subsequently moved to a more modern facility in the basement of the new Student Union Building (Bloomfield Centre) in 1971. The "Radio St. F.X Society" functioned with Student Union funding and support and became a venue for many St. F.X. students with interest in communications and media production. Numbers of student volunteers worked to provide news and music programming. The original VOX dream of broadcasting locally with an actual licensed transmitter did not die and the society awaited less stringent Canadian Radio Television Commission rules to apply for a local low power broadcast license.

In 1981, CFXU began broadcasting in student residences at 690 AM via carrier current. This system used the ordinary electrical wires of the university buildings as an antenna. Students in residence could listen using an AM radio receiver.

In 1984, CFXU also began broadcasting on through Eastlink cable's Antigonish system. Anyone with cable television could listen to the station through their television.

In October 1999, CFXU broadcast its signal over the internet by way of a streaming MP3 signal using Shoutcast. They were the first Canadian university radio station to do this.

In 2002, the station was granted a developmental FM license from the CRTC.

In late September 2006, the station was successful in its application to the CRTC for a campus community broadcast license and broadcast ability increase. This new license will enable the station to grow in size over the next 3 to 4 years. The station is run on a day-to-day basis by a small but dedicated staff of full-time students and is funded by the St. FX Student Union.

On July 22, 2008, Radio CFXU Club, the licensee proposed to amend the licence by changing the frequency from 92.5 MHz (channel 223LP) to 93.3 MHz (channel 227LP). That application was approved on August 12, 2008.
