= KCFZ-LP =

- Fresno, California; United States
- Frequency: 93.3 MHz

Programming
- Format: Variety

Ownership
- Owner: Creative Fresno

History
- First air date: August 31, 2017

Technical information
- Licensing authority: FCC
- Facility ID: 193748
- Class: L1
- ERP: 0.05
- HAAT: 28.9 meters (97.769 feet)

Links
- Public license information: LMS

KCFZ-LP is a low-power FM radio station licensed by Creative Fresno that broadcasts a variety format to Fresno, California on 93.3 FM. It went on the air on August 31, 2017.
