= KBGT =

Coordinates: 32°15′56″N 99°42′25″W

- Buffalo Gap, Texas; United States
- Broadcast area: Abilene, Texas
- Frequency: 93.3 MHz
- Branding: La Voz 93.3 FM

Programming
- Format: Tejano music

Ownership
- Owner: Extreme Media, LLC

History
- Call sign meaning: Buffalo Gap, Texas

Technical information
- Licensing authority: FCC
- Facility ID: 183341
- Class: C3
- ERP: 7,200 watts
- HAAT: 184 meters (604 ft)

Links
- Public license information: Public file; LMS
- Webcast: Listen live
- Website: lavoz933.com

KBGT (93.3 FM) is a radio station licensed to Buffalo Gap, Texas. The station broadcasts a Tejano music format and is owned by Extreme Media, LLC.
