= WKVW =

- Marmet, West Virginia; United States
- Broadcast area: Charleston, West Virginia; Kanawha County, West Virginia
- Frequency: 93.3 MHz (HD Radio)
- Branding: K-LOVE

Programming
- Format: Contemporary Christian
- Subchannels: HD2: Air1; HD3: K-Love 2000s
- Affiliations: K-Love

Ownership
- Owner: Educational Media Foundation

History
- First air date: 1995
- Former call signs: WKZM (1991–2003)
- Call sign meaning: W K-LoVe West Virginia

Technical information
- Licensing authority: FCC
- Facility ID: 54370
- Class: A
- ERP: 1,700 watts
- HAAT: 189 meters
- Transmitter coordinates: 38°16′32.0″N 81°31′36.0″W
- Translators: 94.9 W235BF (St. Albans); 98.1 W251BH (Montgomery); HD2: 88.9 W205CG (Charleston)

Links
- Public license information: Public file; LMS
- Webcast: Listen Live; Listen Live (HD2); Losten Live (HD3)
- Website: klove.com air1.com (HD2)

WKVW (93.3 FM) is a Contemporary Christian formatted broadcast radio station licensed to Marmet, West Virginia, serving Charleston and Kanawha County, West Virginia. WKVW is owned and operated by Educational Media Foundation.

WKVW is part of the K-Love network of Contemporary Christian Music radio stations.
