= WNBR =

WNBR may refer to:

- World Network of Biosphere Reserves
- World Naked Bike Ride
- WZXL, a radio station (100.7 FM) licensed to serve Wildwood, New Jersey, United States which held the call sign WNBR from 1981 to 1986
- WLXB, a radio station (98.9 FM) licensed to serve Bethel, North Carolina, United States, which held the call sign WNBR-FM from 2004 to 2015
- WNBU, a radio station (94.1 FM) licensed to serve Oriental, North Carolina, United States, which held the call sign WNBR from 1992 to 2004
