= WKJJ-LP/WPJQ-LP =

WKJJ-LP; WPJQ-LP
Currently silent

Milwaukee, Wisconsin; United States
- Frequency: 101.3 MHz

Programming
- Format: Community; urban contemporary, gospel, R&B, hip-hop, jazz, blues

Ownership
- Owner: WKJJ-LP: Inner City Development Project, Inc.; WPJQ-LP: Faith Community Development Corporation

History
- First air date: June 2016

Technical information
- Facility ID: WKJJ-LP: 196385; WPJQ-LP: 196240
- ERP: 100 watts
- HAAT: 8.2 meters (27 ft)
- Transmitter coordinates: 43.5°N 88°W

Links
- Website: WKJJ/WPJQ; WPJQ

WKJJ-LP and WPJQ-LP (101.3 FM) are two shared-time non-commercial low-power radio stations licensed to Milwaukee, Wisconsin. The two stations, both with separate licensees, management and mailing addresses, share different time blocks on one frequency, though both brand together and air similar talk and music programming targeting Milwaukee's African-American community.

The two stations, as of September 10, 2018, are silent, as both stations began seeking a new broadcast tower site. WPJQ-LP gained approval of a construction permit for a new tower location on January 28, 2019.
