= WEVI =

- Frederiksted, U.S. Virgin Islands; United States
- Frequency: 101.3 MHz
- Branding: ROE FM 101.3

Programming
- Format: Urban contemporary

Ownership
- Owner: Halima S. Roebuck; (HSR Communications, LLC)

History
- First air date: November 27, 2001
- Former frequencies: 101.7 MHz (2001–2013); 102.1 MHz (2013–2017)
- Call sign meaning: Everything Virgin Islands

Technical information
- Licensing authority: FCC
- Facility ID: 86811
- Class: A
- ERP: 900 watts
- HAAT: 241 meters (791 ft)
- Transmitter coordinates: 17°43′15″N 64°51′26″W

Links
- Public license information: Public file; LMS
- Webcast: Listen live

WEVI (101.3 FM) is a radio station licensed to serve Frederiksted, U.S. Virgin Islands. The station is owned by Halima S. Roebuck, through licensee HSR Communications, LLC. It airs an urban contemporary format that offers a mix of hip hop, R&B, reggae, Dancehall Calypso, soca and Afrobeats. It is branded as ROE FM 101.3.

The station has been assigned these call letters by the Federal Communications Commission since November 27, 2001.

== Logos ==
Former WEVI logo as Power 101.7
