= KLIT (FM) =

Radio station in Ranchitos Las Lomas–Laredo, Texas

Coordinates: 27°36′55.6″N 99°13′25.4″W

- Ranchitos Las Lomas, Texas; United States
- Broadcast area: Laredo, Texas
- Frequency: 93.3 MHz
- Branding: Radio Cristiana

Programming
- Format: Spanish Christian

Ownership
- Owner: La Nueva Cadena Radio Luz Incorporated

History
- Former call signs: KBAW (1998–2012)
- Former frequencies: 93.5 MHz (2001–2013)

Technical information
- Licensing authority: FCC
- Facility ID: 86858
- Class: A
- ERP: 6,000 watts
- Repeater: KLIT-FM1 Orvil (7 watts)

Links
- Public license information: Public file; LMS

KLIT (93.3 FM) is a Spanish language Christian format radio station that serves the Laredo, Texas, area.

In July 2019, the station lost access to its licensed site; it is nominally operating from a temporary site.
