= WVIL =

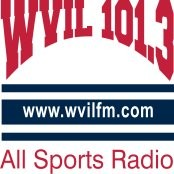
- Virginia, Illinois; United States
- Frequency: 101.3 MHz
- Branding: WVIL 101.3

Programming
- Language: English
- Format: Sports
- Affiliations: Fox Sports Radio; Motor Racing Network; Performance Racing Network; Chicago Bears; Chicago Bulls; Chicago White Sox

Ownership
- Owner: LB Sports Productions LLC
- Sister stations: WKXQ

History
- First air date: 1998
- Former call signs: WAOG (1995)
- Call sign meaning: Virginia, IL

Technical information
- Licensing authority: FCC
- Facility ID: 40222
- Class: A
- ERP: 4,000 watts
- HAAT: 119 meters (390 ft)
- Transmitter coordinates: 40°00′52″N 90°19′55″W

Links
- Public license information: Public file; LMS
- Webcast: Listen Live
- Website: wvilfm.com

WVIL (101.3 FM) is an American radio station licensed to serve the community of Virginia, Illinois, since 1998. The station's broadcast license is held by Larry Bostwick's LB Sports Productions LLC.

== Programming ==
WVIL broadcasts a sports format as an affiliate of the Fox Sports Radio and Yahoo! Sports Radio networks since July 2004. As of January 2012, weekday programming includes The Steve Czaban Show, The Dan Patrick Show, The Jim Rome Show, The Loose Cannons with Pat O'Brien, Steve Hartman, and Vic "The Brick" Jacobs, plus Into the Night with Tony Bruno, and The J.T. the Brick Show with J.T. the Brick and Tomm Looney.

Sports broadcasts on WVIL include Notre Dame Fighting Irish football, Chicago White Sox baseball, Chicago Bears football, Chicago Bulls basketball, plus both Sprint Cup Series and Nationwide Series stock car racing.

== History ==
In February 1995, Mark J. Langston applied to the Federal Communications Commission (FCC) for a construction permit for a new broadcast radio station. The FCC granted this permit on August 8, 1995, with a scheduled expiration date of February 8, 1997. The new station was assigned call sign "WAOG" on August 8, 1995. The call sign was changed to "WVIL" on November 2, 1995. After several modifications, construction and testing were completed in February 1998 and the station was granted its broadcast license on May 8, 1998.

In December 2008, Mark J. Langston reached a deal to sell WVIL to Larry Bostwick through his LB Sports Productions LLC holding company for $180,000. Bostwick had already been operating the station for several years under a local marketing agreement. The FCC approved the deal on February 3, 2009, and the transaction was completed on February 6, 2009.
