= KXNB-LP =

- Omaha, Nebraska; United States
- Broadcast area: Northern Omaha
- Frequency: 101.3 MHz

Programming
- Format: Urban contemporary

Ownership
- Owner: Malcolm X Memorial Foundation

History
- First air date: 2016

Technical information
- Licensing authority: FCC
- Facility ID: 194041
- Class: L1
- ERP: 11 watts
- HAAT: 45.11 metres (148 ft)
- Transmitter coordinates: 41°17′13″N 96°00′15″W

Links
- Public license information: LMS
- Website: Official website

KXNB-LP (101.3 FM) is a low power radio station broadcasting an urban contemporary format. The station is operated by The Malcolm X Memorial Foundation. The station serves northern Omaha. A ribbon cutting ceremony for the station was held in 2017.
