= WVAI-LP =

- Charlottesville, Virginia; United States
- Broadcast area: Charlottesville, Virginia; Albemarle County, Virginia
- Frequency: 101.3 MHz
- Branding: 101 Jamz

Programming
- Format: Urban contemporary

Ownership
- Owner: Air Mix Virginia

History
- First air date: September 21, 2015

Technical information
- Licensing authority: FCC
- Facility ID: 193001
- Class: L1
- ERP: 21 watts
- HAAT: 63 meters (207 ft)
- Transmitter coordinates: 38°4′39.0″N 78°28′21.0″W

Links
- Public license information: LMS
- Webcast: Listen live
- Website: 101jamz.com

WVAI-LP is an urban contemporary formatted low-power radio station licensed to Charlottesville, Virginia, serving Charlottesville and Albemarle County in Virginia. WVAI-LP is owned and operated by Air Mix Virginia.
