= KVAK-FM =

Coordinates: 61.121°N 146.259°W

- Valdez, Alaska; United States
- Broadcast area: South Central Alaska
- Frequency: 93.3 (MHz)
- Branding: KVAK Radio

Programming
- Format: Adult Contemporary/ Classic rock

Ownership
- Owner: North Wave Communications, Inc.

History
- First air date: May 1, 1999

Technical information
- Licensing authority: FCC
- Facility ID: 88010
- Class: A
- ERP: 1,200 watts
- HAAT: -597 meters

Links
- Public license information: Public file; LMS
- Website: http://www.kvakradio.com

KVAK-FM is a commercial adult contemporary/classic rock radio station in Valdez, Alaska, broadcasting on 93.3FM.

KVAK-FM obtains its programming from Dial Global Networks.
