= New Dover, Ohio =

- Unincorporated community
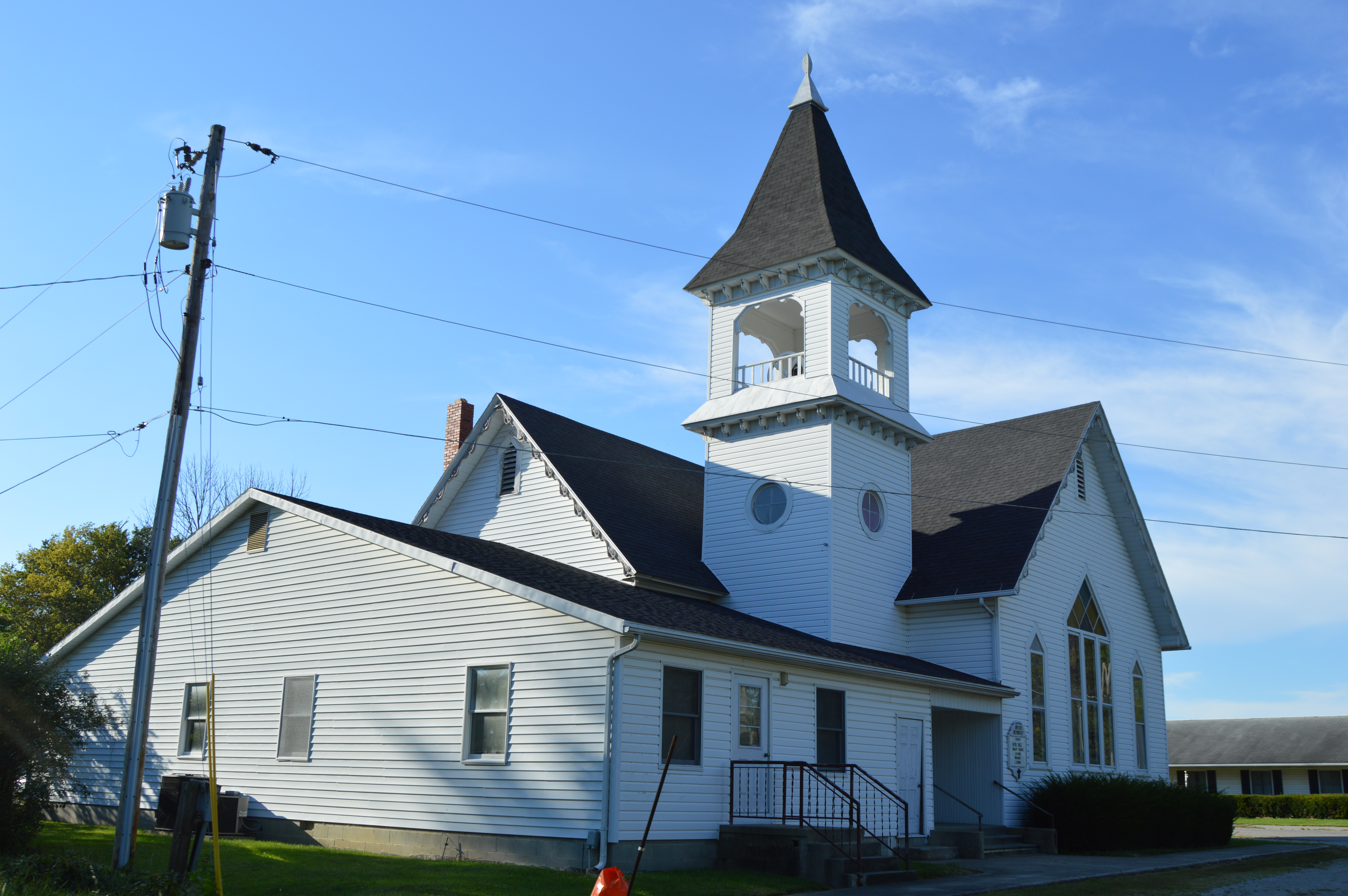
- Methodist church

- Location within Ohio
- Coordinates: 40°14′48″N 83°18′17″W
- Country: United States
- State: Ohio
- Counties: Union
- Elevation: 968 ft (295 m)
- Time zone: UTC-5 (Eastern (EST))
  - Summer (DST): UTC-4 (EDT)
- ZIP code: 43040
- Area codes: 937, 326
- GNIS feature ID: 1065116

New Dover is an unincorporated community in Dover Township, Union County, Ohio, United States. It is located along U.S. Route 36, about three miles east of Marysville.

New Dover was originally called Dover, and under the latter name was laid out and platted in 1854. The New Dover Post Office was established on February 5, 1856. As of 1877, the village did a considerable amount of manufacturing business. It contained one church, a school-house, one harness shop, one blacksmith shop, and several other stores. The post office was discontinued on April 30, 1935. The mail service is now sent through the Marysville branch.
