= WNRB-LP =

- Wausau, Wisconsin; United States
- Broadcast area: Wausau area
- Frequency: 93.3 MHz

Ownership
- Owner: Wausau Area Hmong Mutual Association

History
- First air date: May 30, 2005

Technical information
- Licensing authority: FCC
- Facility ID: 131637
- Class: L1
- ERP: 6 watts
- HAAT: 118.5 meters (389 ft)
- Transmitter coordinates: 44°53′17.00″N 89°39′7.00″W

Links
- Public license information: LMS
- Website: http://www.wausauhmong.org/radio.htm

WNRB-LP (93.3 FM) is a radio station licensed as a low power, community radio station in Wausau, Wisconsin, United States, serving the Greater Wausau area. This designation means they are a non-commercial, non-profit entity offering primarily locally produced programming. All on-air programs are presented by non-paid volunteers. The station is owned by Wausau Area Hmong Mutual Association.
