= CBKA-FM =

CBC Radio One station in Saskatchewan, Canada

- La Ronge, Saskatchewan; Canada
- Broadcast area: Northern Saskatchewan
- Frequency: 105.9 MHz

Programming
- Format: News/Talk
- Network: CBC Radio One

Ownership
- Owner: Canadian Broadcasting Corporation

History
- First air date: July 31, 1975
- Call sign meaning: Variation of CBK

Technical information
- Class: A1
- ERP: 80 watts
- HAAT: 42 metres (138 ft)

Links
- Website: CBC Saskatchewan

CBKA-FM is a Canadian radio station, broadcasting the CBC Radio One network at 105.9 FM in La Ronge, Saskatchewan.

== Local programming ==
Until 2009, CBKA had a local news bureau serving Northern Saskatchewan and produced the regional noontime show Keewatin Country, but otherwise aired the same programming as CBK, the Radio One outlet for the more populated southern half of the province. In the CBC's service cutbacks announced in March 2009, the operation in La Ronge was eliminated, making CBKA a full rebroadcaster of CBK. All programming is now fed from CBK's studios in Regina, though the station remains separately licensed.

== Rebroadcasters ==
CBKA-FM has the following rebroadcasters:

Rebroadcasters of CBKA-FM
| City of licence | Identifier | Frequency | RECNet | CRTC Decision | Notes |
|---|---|---|---|---|---|
| Beauval | CBKB-FM | 101.5 FM | Query | | 55°3′6.12″N 107°45′25.20″W |
| Buffalo Narrows | CBKD-FM | 103.5 FM | Query | | 55°56′39.84″N 108°33′39.60″W |
| Creighton | CBKA-FM-1 | 93.3 FM | Query | | 53°56′33″N 102°17′2.40″W |
| Cumberland House | CBKV-FM | 94.9 FM | Query | | 54°39′19.08″N 102°4′33.60″W |
| Denare Beach | CBKO-FM | 94.3 FM | Query | | 54°39′19.08″N 102°4′33.60″W |
| Fond-du-Lac | CBKG-FM | 100.1 FM | Query | | 59°22′51.96″N 107°8′38.40″W |
| Île-à-la-Crosse | CBKC-FM | 105.1 FM | Query | | 55°30′24.84″N 107°58′55.20″W |
| Island Falls | CBKN-FM | 105.1 FM | Query | | 55°29′47.04″N 102°18′0″W |
| La Loche | CBKE-FM | 95.5 FM | Query | | 56°29′2.04″N 109°26′13.20″W |
| Montreal Lake | CBKL-FM | 93.3 FM | Query | | 54°2′44.88″N 105°46′58.80″W |
| Patuanak | CBKK-FM | 105.5 FM | Query | | 55°55′0.12″N 107°43′22.80″W |
| Pelican Narrows | CBKW-FM | 105.9 FM | Query | | 55°12′2.16″N 102°54′39.60″W |
| Pinehouse Lake | CBKJ-FM | 94.1 FM | Query | | 55°31′23.88″N 106°34′33.60″W |
| Southend | CBKP-FM | 91.7 FM | Query | | 56°19′59.88″N 103°21′36″W |
| Stanley Mission | CBKI-FM | 95.5 FM | Query | | 55°23′47.04″N 104°35′27.60″W |
| Stony Rapids | CBKH-FM | 93.3 FM | Query | | 59°11′20.04″N 105°55′4.80″W |
| Uranium City | CBDH-FM | 105.1 FM | Query | | 59°34′41.16″N 108°35′45.60″W |

=== Community-owned rebroadcasters ===
Rebroadcasters of CBKA-FM
| City of licence | Identifier | Frequency | RECNet | CRTC Decision | Notes |
|---|---|---|---|---|---|
| Athabasca Hydro Station | VF2280 | 88.1 FM | Query | 94-614 | 59°37′40.08″N 109°1′4.80″W |

== Notes ==
On August 10, 2009, the CBC applied to add an FM transmitter at Creighton. The application was approved on October 9, 2009, and will operate on the frequency 93.3 MHz with the callsign CBKA-FM-1.
