= Ohio State Route 739 =

State highway in central Ohio, US

State Route 739

Route information
- Maintained by ODOT
- Length: 35.50 mi (57.13 km)
- Existed: 1937–present

Major junctions
- South end: US 33 / SR 287 near North Lewisburg
- North end: SR 4 / SR 423 in Marion

Location
- Country: United States
- State: Ohio
- Counties: Union, Marion

Highway system
- Ohio State Highway System; Interstate; US; State; Scenic
← SR 736	→ SR 741

State Route 739 (SR 739) is a 35.50-mile (57.13 km) long north–south state highway in the central portion of the U.S. state of Ohio. The route's southern terminus is at an interchange with U.S. Route 33 (US 33) nearly 5.25 miles (8.45 km) northeast of North Lewisburg at an interchange that doubles as the eastern terminus of SR 287. The northern terminus of SR 739 is near downtown Marion, where it meets SR 4 and SR 423.

== Route description ==
SR 739 starts near the Honda Marysville Auto Plant, then passes through the western and northern portions of Union County, including the communities of Raymond, York Center, Byhalia, Arbela, West Jackson, and Essex. It continues through Green Camp and into Marion in the southwestern part of Marion County. No part of this state route is included within National Highway System (NHS), a network of highways deemed to be most important for the economy, mobility and defense of the nation.

== History ==
SR 739 made its debut in 1937. Since its inception, it has utilized the same routing through portions of Union and Marion Counties.

== Major intersections ==
County	Location	mi	km	Destinations	Notes
Union	Allen Township	0.00	0.00	US 33 / SR 287 west	Interchange; eastern terminus of SR 287
Union	Liberty Township	5.94	9.56	SR 347 west	Southern end of SR 347 concurrency
Union	Liberty Township	6.06	9.75	SR 347 east	Northern end of SR 347 concurrency
Union	York Township	11.37	18.30	SR 47	
Union	Washington Township	14.13	22.74	SR 31 south	Southern end of SR 31 concurrency
Union	Washington Township	14.74	23.72	SR 31 north	Northern end of SR 31 concurrency
Union	Jackson Township	22.68	36.50	SR 37 west	Southern end of SR 37 concurrency
Union	Jackson Township	22.93	36.90	SR 37 east	Northern end of SR 37 concurrency
Marion	Green Camp Township	31.28	50.34	SR 203	
Marion	Marion	35.50	57.13	SR 4 / SR 423	
1.000 mi = 1.609 km; 1.000 km = 0.621 mi: Concurrency terminus
