= Arbela, Ohio =

- Unincorporated community
- Location within Ohio
- Coordinates: 40°28′54″N 83°24′25″W
- Country: United States
- State: Ohio
- Counties: Union
- Elevation: 988 ft (301 m)
- Time zone: UTC-5 (Eastern (EST))
  - Summer (DST): UTC-4 (EDT)
- ZIP code: 43344
- Area codes: 937, 326
- GNIS feature ID: 1055573

Arbela is an unincorporated community in Washington Township, Union County, Ohio, United States. It is located at the intersection of Ohio State Route 739 and Cunningham-Arbela Road.

Arbela was platted on July 25, 1838, by Marquis L. Osborne. Although Arbela was initially given 40 lots, not much of a town was ever built, only a school, grocer, and gunsmith. The Arbela Post Office was established October 24, 1887, and discontinued May 31, 1907. Mail service is now sent through the Richwood branch.

Telephone service was installed from Byhalia to Arbela in 1900.
