= York Township, Illinois =

York Township, Illinois may refer to one of the following townships:

- York Township, Carroll County, Illinois
- York Township, Clark County, Illinois
- York Township, DuPage County, Illinois

== See also ==
- York Township (disambiguation)
- List of Illinois townships
