= York Center =

York Center may refer to:

== Canada ==
- York Centre, Toronto, Ontario
- York Centre (provincial electoral district), Ontario

== United States ==
- York Center, Illinois
- York Center, Ohio
- York Center, Wisconsin

== See also ==
- North York City Centre, Toronto, Ontario, Canada
