= West Jackson, Ohio =

- Unincorporated community
- Location within Ohio
- Coordinates: 40°29′03″N 83°22′43″W
- Country: United States
- State: Ohio
- Counties: Union
- Elevation: 974 ft (297 m)
- Time zone: UTC-5 (Eastern (EST))
  - Summer (DST): UTC-4 (EDT)
- ZIP code: 43344
- Area codes: 937, 326
- GNIS feature ID: 1047768

West Jackson is an unincorporated community in Washington Township, Union County, Ohio, United States. It is located at the intersection of Ohio State Route 739 and Winnemac Pike.
