= Bucks Township, Ohio =

Township in Ohio, US

- Township
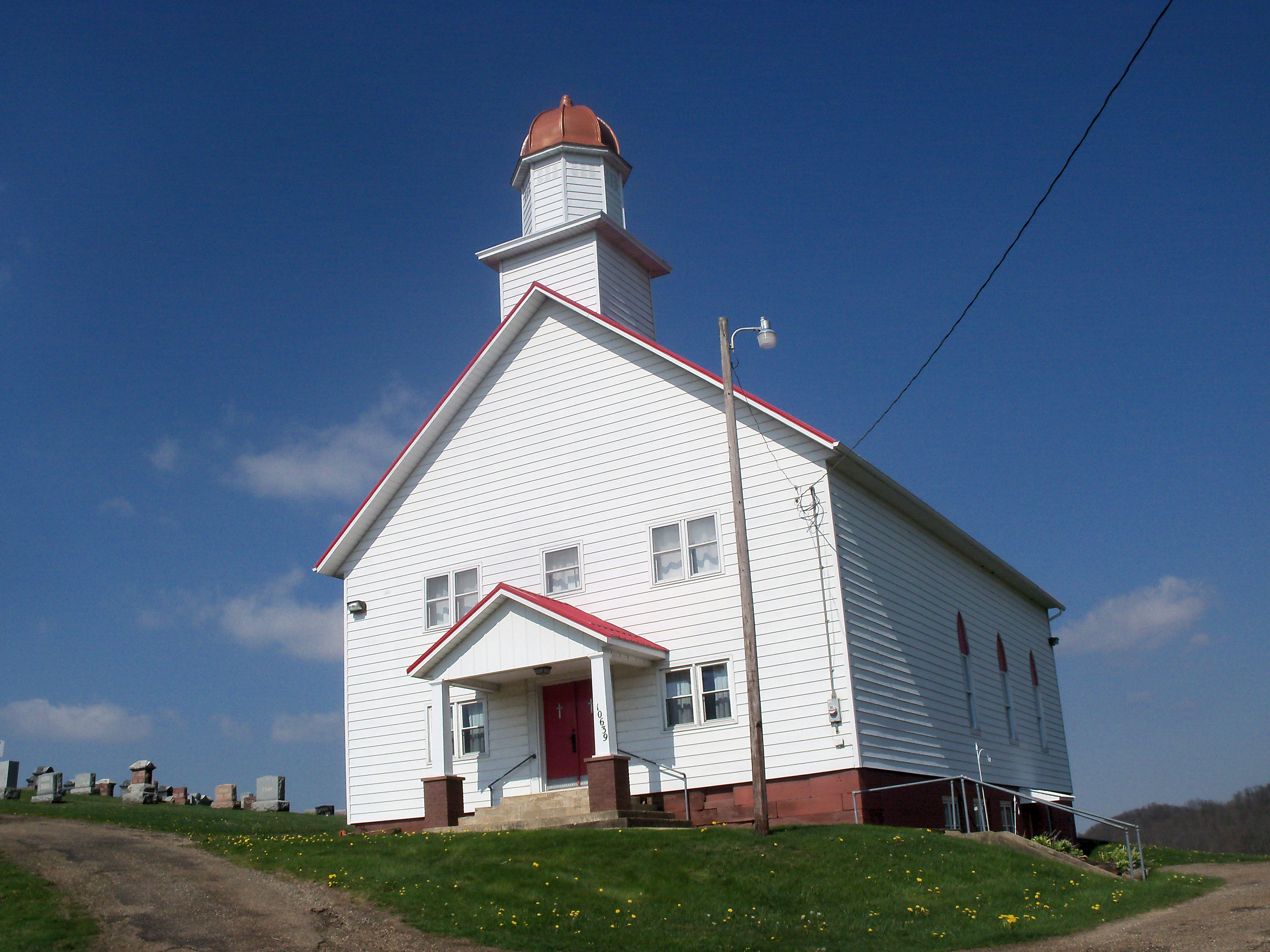
- Saint Peters United Church of Christ in Fiat

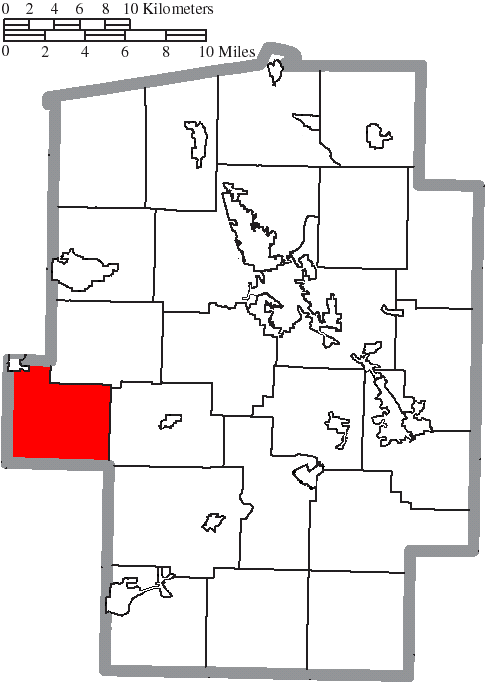
- Location of Bucks Township in Tuscarawas County
- Coordinates: 40°24′47″N 81°40′29″W
- Country: United States
- State: Ohio
- County: Tuscarawas

Area
  - Total: 22.6 sq mi (58.6 km^{2})
  - Land: 22.6 sq mi (58.6 km^{2})
  - Water: 0 sq mi (0.0 km^{2})
- Elevation: 1,191 ft (363 m)

Population (2020)
  - Total: 1,942
  - Density: 85.8/sq mi (33.1/km^{2})
- Time zone: UTC-5 (Eastern (EST))
  - Summer (DST): UTC-4 (EDT)
- ZIP code: 43804
- Area code: 330
- FIPS code: 39-09988
- GNIS feature ID: 1087051

Historical population
Census	Pop.	Note	%±
1990	1,298		—
2000	1,601		23.3%
2010	1,776		10.9%
2020	1,942		9.3%
U.S. Census:

Bucks Township is one of the twenty-two townships of Tuscarawas County, Ohio, United States. The 2020 census found 1,942 people in the township.

== Geography ==
Located in the western part of the county, it borders the following townships:

- Auburn Township - northeast
- Jefferson Township - east
- Salem Township - southeast corner
- Adams Township, Coshocton County - south
- White Eyes Township, Coshocton County - southwest corner
- Crawford Township, Coshocton County - west
- Clark Township, Holmes County - northwest

Part of the village of Baltic is located in the northwestern corner of Bucks Township.

== Name and history ==
It is the only Bucks Township statewide.

== Government ==
The township is governed by a three-member board of trustees, who are elected in November of odd-numbered years to a four-year term beginning on the following January 1. Two are elected in the year after the presidential election and one is elected in the year before it. There is also an elected township fiscal officer, who serves a four-year term beginning on April 1 of the year after the election, which is held in November of the year before the presidential election. Vacancies in the fiscal officership or on the board of trustees are filled by the remaining trustees. The current trustees are Terry Mizer, Douglas Ott, and Gene Stein, and the fiscal officer is Amy Mizer.
