= York Township, Ohio =

York Township, Ohio may refer to:

- York Township, Athens County, Ohio
- York Township, Belmont County, Ohio
- York Township, Darke County, Ohio
- York Township, Fulton County, Ohio
- York Township, Medina County, Ohio
- York Township, Morgan County, Ohio
- York Township, Sandusky County, Ohio
- York Township, Tuscarawas County, Ohio
- York Township, Union County, Ohio
- York Township, Van Wert County, Ohio

== See also ==
- York Township (disambiguation)
