= Bakersville =

Bakersville may refer to:

- Bakersville, Mercer County, New Jersey
- Bakersville, North Carolina
- Bakersville, Ohio

== See also ==
- Bakersfield, California
