= Ohio State Route 30 =

State Route 30

Route information
- Maintained by ODOT

Location
- Country: United States
- State: Ohio

Highway system
- Ohio State Highway System; Interstate; US; State; Scenic
← US 30	→ SR 31

In Ohio, State Route 30 may refer to:

- U.S. Route 30 in Ohio, the only Ohio highway numbered 30 since 1927
- Ohio State Route 30 (1923-1927), now SR 13 (Athens to Norwalk) and US 250 (Norwalk to Sandusky)
