= Essex, Ohio =

- Unincorporated community
- Location within Ohio
- Coordinates: 40°28′57″N 83°18′57″W
- Country: United States
- State: Ohio
- Counties: Union
- Elevation: 945 ft (288 m)
- Time zone: UTC-5 (Eastern (EST))
  - Summer (DST): UTC-4 (EDT)
- ZIP code: 43344
- Area code: 740
- GNIS feature ID: 1083981

Essex is an unincorporated community on the east side of Rush Creek in the central part of Jackson Township, Union County, Ohio, United States. It is at the intersection of State Routes 37 and 739.

== History ==
The community of Essex was originally surveyed on September 2, 1836 by William C. Lawrence for John Cheney. It was originally hoped that Essex would be the seat of justice for a new county, but the plans to create a new county were unsuccessful, and any population was slow to arrive. The first cabin was built in town in 1838, and the post office (called Rush Creek Post Office) was established on July 13, 1848, with Tabor Randall as the first Postmaster. As of 1877, Essex contained two stores, a schoolhouse, and a sawmill. The Rush Creek Grange, No. 710, was organized in 1874 but was only active for a few years, and an Independent Order of Odd Fellows hall was built in the fall of 1875, instituted on June 20, 1876, and had at least 16 members by 1883. By 1883, there was one general store, one grocery, a flour and sawmill, a blacksmith, a repair shop, one physician, and a shoe shop. The Post Office changed its name to Rushcreek on November 3, 1894, and was discontinued on June 29, 1907. The mail service is now sent through the Richwood Post Office.
