= York Township, Indiana =

York Township, Indiana may refer to one of the following places:

- York Township, Benton County, Indiana
- York Township, Dearborn County, Indiana
- York Township, Elkhart County, Indiana
- York Township, Noble County, Indiana
- York Township, Steuben County, Indiana
- York Township, Switzerland County, Indiana

See also

- York Township (disambiguation)
