= Byhalia =

Byhalia may refer to:

- Byhalia, Mississippi
- Byhalia, Ohio
