= Auburn Township, Ohio =

Auburn Township, Ohio, may refer to:

- Auburn Township, Crawford County, Ohio
- Auburn Township, Geauga County, Ohio
- Auburn Township, Tuscarawas County, Ohio
