= Somersville, Ohio =

- Unincorporated community
- Location within Ohio
- Coordinates: 40°24′00″N 83°24′40″W
- Country: United States
- State: Ohio
- Counties: Union
- Elevation: 997 ft (304 m)
- Time zone: UTC-5 (Eastern (EST))
  - Summer (DST): UTC-4 (EDT)
- ZIP code: 43344
- Area code: 740
- GNIS feature ID: 1061661

Somersville (sometimes spelled Summersville) is an unincorporated community in York Township, Union County, Ohio, United States. It is located at the intersection of Ohio State Routes 31 and 47.

== History ==
The community of Somersville was laid in 1834 by Thomas Price and William Somers. The Bokes Creek Post Office was established April 26, 1850, with Amon S. Davis as postmaster, and was discontinued on June 30, 1904. As of 1877, the town contained two grocery stores, a blacksmith shop, a shoe shop, and one physician. The mail service is now sent through the Peoria Post Office.
