= Ohio State Route 21 (disambiguation) =

In Ohio, State Route 21 may refer to:

- Ohio State Route 21, assigned to part of former US 21 by 1971
- U.S. Route 21 in Ohio, the only Ohio highway numbered 21 between 1927 and about 1970
- Ohio State Route 21 (1923-1927), now US 33 (Pomeroy to Marysville) and SR 31 (Marysville to Findlay)
