= York Township =

York Township may refer to the following places:

== In Canada ==
- York Township, Ontario, a former municipality, now part of Toronto

== In the United States ==
=== Arkansas ===
- York Township, Lonoke County, Arkansas

=== Illinois ===
- York Township, Carroll County, Illinois
- York Township, Clark County, Illinois
- York Township, DuPage County, Illinois

=== Indiana ===
- York Township, Benton County, Indiana
- York Township, Dearborn County, Indiana
- York Township, Elkhart County, Indiana
- York Township, Noble County, Indiana
- York Township, Steuben County, Indiana
- York Township, Switzerland County, Indiana

=== Iowa ===
- York Township, Iowa County, Iowa
- York Township, Pottawattamie County, Iowa
- York Township, Tama County, Iowa

=== Kansas ===
- York Township, Stafford County, Kansas

=== Michigan ===
- York Charter Township, Michigan, in Washtenaw County

=== Minnesota ===
- York Township, Fillmore County, Minnesota

=== Missouri ===
- York Township, Putnam County, Missouri
- there is also: New York Township, Caldwell County, Missouri

=== North Dakota ===
- York Township, Benson County, North Dakota

=== Ohio ===
- York Township, Athens County, Ohio
- York Township, Belmont County, Ohio
- York Township, Darke County, Ohio
- York Township, Fulton County, Ohio
- York Township, Medina County, Ohio
- York Township, Morgan County, Ohio
- York Township, Sandusky County, Ohio
- York Township, Tuscarawas County, Ohio
- York Township, Union County, Ohio
- York Township, Van Wert County, Ohio

=== Pennsylvania ===
- York Township, Pennsylvania

=== South Dakota ===
- York Township, Day County, South Dakota
- York Township, Hand County, South Dakota

== See also ==
- York (disambiguation)
