= Jefferson Township, Tuscarawas County, Ohio =

Township in Ohio, US

- Township
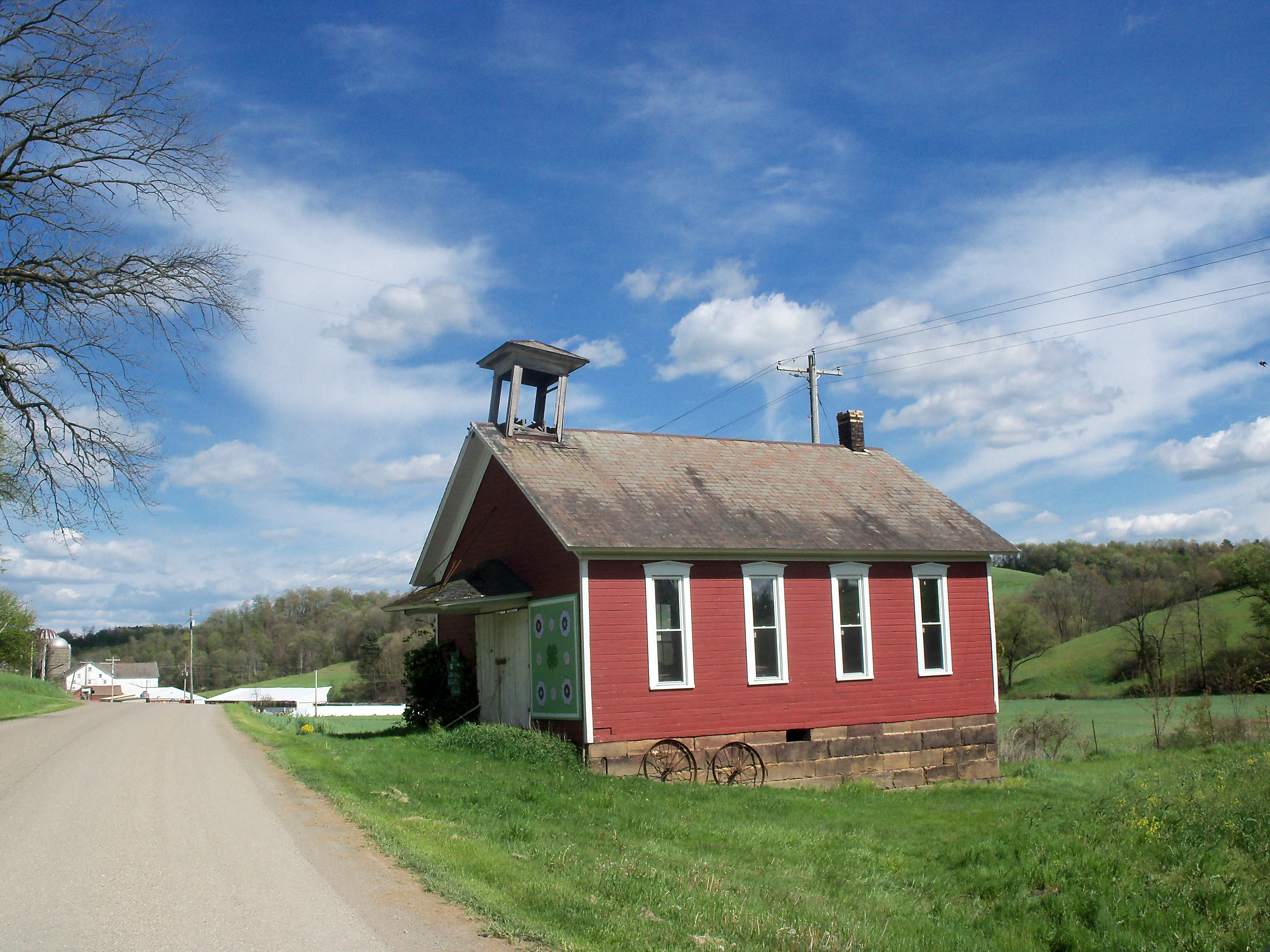
- The former Angel Valley School on County Road 49

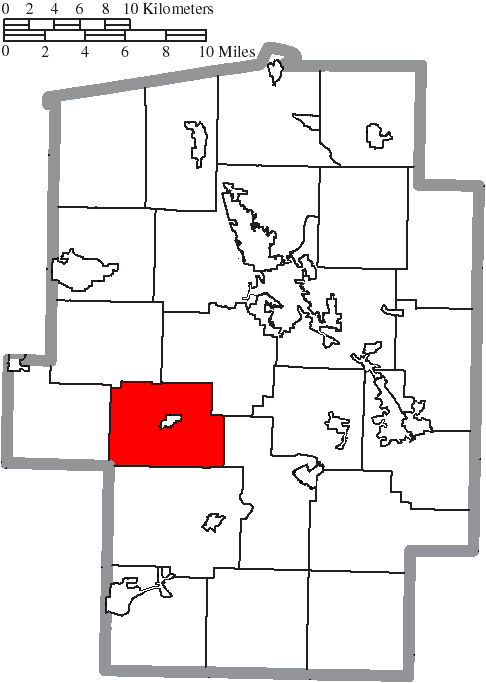
- Location of Jefferson Township in Tuscarawas County
- Coordinates: 40°23′58″N 81°33′30″W
- Country: United States
- State: Ohio
- County: Tuscarawas

Area
  - Total: 22.4 sq mi (57.9 km^{2})
  - Land: 22.4 sq mi (57.9 km^{2})
  - Water: 0 sq mi (0.0 km^{2})
- Elevation: 1,001 ft (305 m)

Population (2020)
  - Total: 958
  - Density: 42.9/sq mi (16.5/km^{2})
- Time zone: UTC-5 (Eastern (EST))
  - Summer (DST): UTC-4 (EDT)
- FIPS code: 39-38836
- GNIS feature ID: 1087057

Jefferson Township is one of the twenty-two townships of Tuscarawas County, Ohio, United States. The 2020 census found 958 people in the township.

== Geography ==
Located in the southwestern part of the county, it borders the following townships:

- York Township - northeast
- Clay Township - southeast
- Salem Township - south
- Adams Township, Coshocton County - southwest corner
- Bucks Township - west
- Auburn Township - northwest

The village of Stone Creek is located in central Jefferson Township.

== Name and history ==
It is one of twenty-four Jefferson Townships statewide.

== Government ==
The township is governed by a three-member board of trustees, who are elected in November of odd-numbered years to a four-year term beginning on the following January 1. Two are elected in the year after the presidential election and one is elected in the year before it. There is also an elected township fiscal officer, who serves a four-year term beginning on April 1 of the year after the election, which is held in November of the year before the presidential election. Vacancies in the fiscal officership or on the board of trustees are filled by the remaining trustees. The current trustees are Perry Beavers, Scott P. Swaldo, and Kenneth Miskimen, and the fiscal officer is Brian Pfeiffer.
