= Adams Township, Coshocton County, Ohio =

Township in Ohio, US

- Township
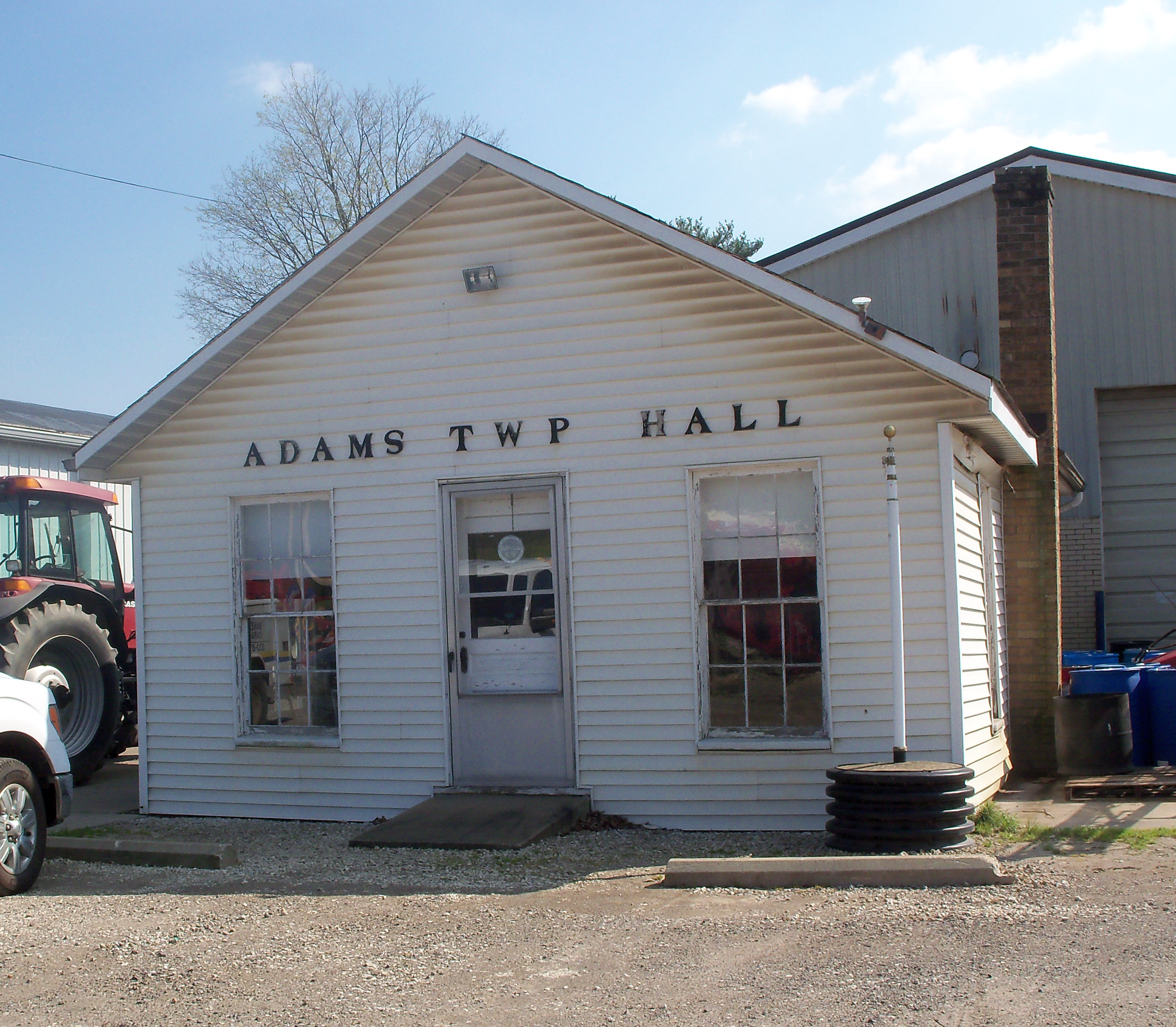
- Adams Township Hall

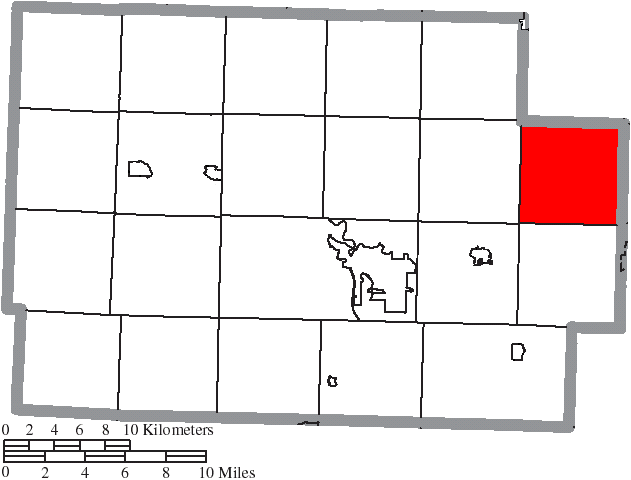
- Location of Adams Township in Coshocton County
- Coordinates: 40°19′44″N 81°39′22″W
- Country: United States
- State: Ohio
- County: Coshocton

Area
  - Total: 25.6 sq mi (66.4 km^{2})
  - Land: 25.6 sq mi (66.4 km^{2})
  - Water: 0 sq mi (0.0 km^{2})
- Elevation: 932 ft (284 m)

Population (2020)
  - Total: 765
  - Density: 29.8/sq mi (11.5/km^{2})
- Time zone: UTC-5 (Eastern (EST))
  - Summer (DST): UTC-4 (EDT)
- FIPS code: 39-00240
- GNIS feature ID: 1085909

Adams Township is one of the twenty-two townships of Coshocton County, Ohio, United States. As of the 2020 census the population was 765.

== Geography ==
Located in the far eastern part of the county, it borders the following townships:

- Bucks Township, Tuscarawas County - north
- Jefferson Township, Tuscarawas County - northeast corner
- Salem Township, Tuscarawas County - east
- Oxford Township, Tuscarawas County - southeast corner
- Oxford Township - south
- Lafayette Township - southwest corner
- White Eyes Township - west
- Crawford Township - northwest corner

No municipalities are located in Adams Township, although the unincorporated community of Bakersville lies in the northeastern part of the township.

== Name and history ==
The Township was organized in 1832. It is one of ten Adams Townships statewide.

== Government ==
The township is governed by a three-member board of trustees, who are elected in November of odd-numbered years to a four-year term beginning on the following January 1. Two are elected in the year after the presidential election and one is elected in the year before it. There is also an elected township fiscal officer, who serves a four-year term beginning on April 1 of the year after the election, which is held in November of the year before the presidential election. Vacancies in the fiscal officership or on the board of trustees are filled by the remaining trustees.
