= Clay Township, Tuscarawas County, Ohio =

Township in Ohio, US

- Township
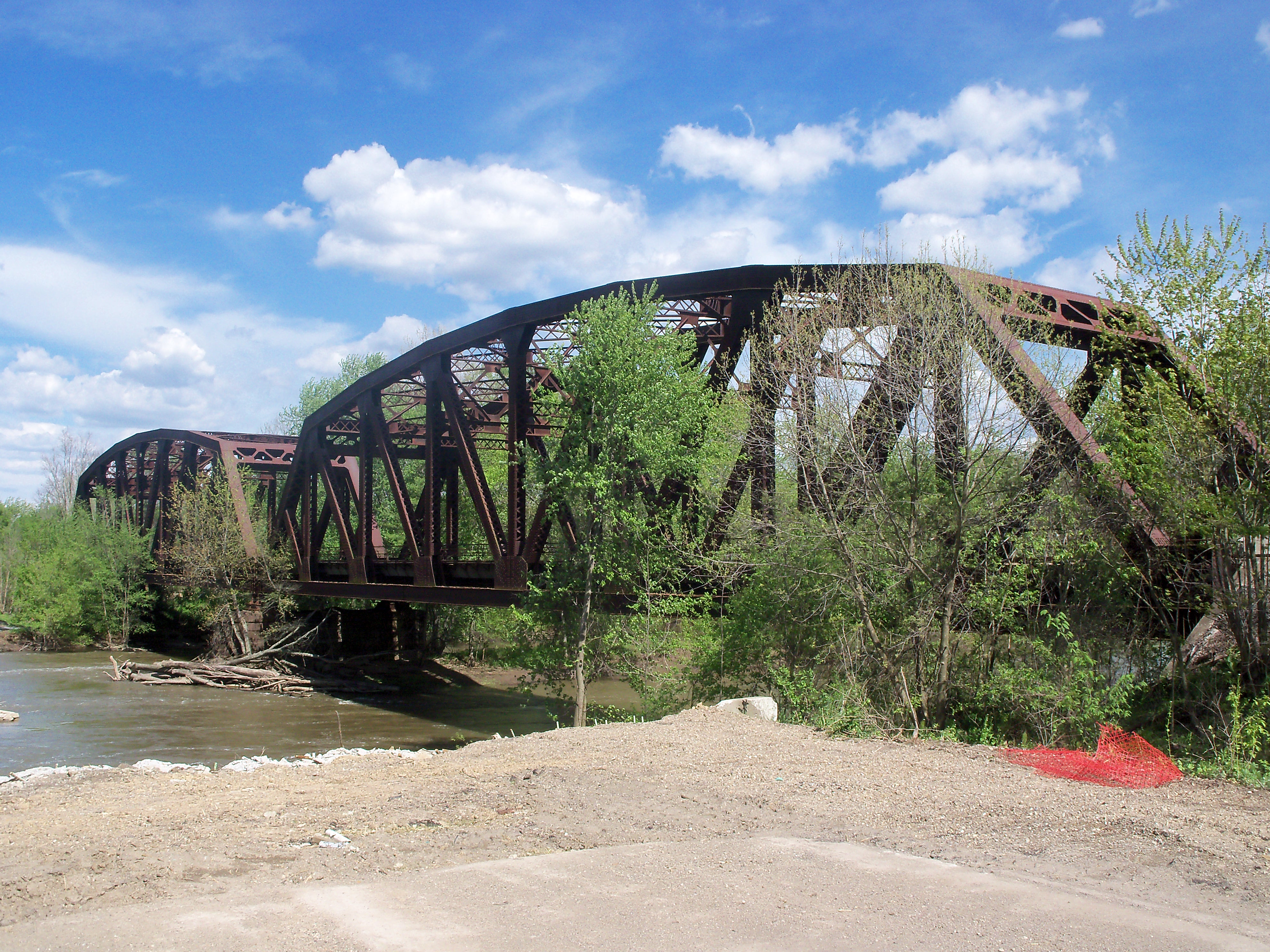
- Columbus and Ohio River Railroad bridge over Tuscarawas River next to U.S. Route 36 leads into Gnadenhutten, Ohio

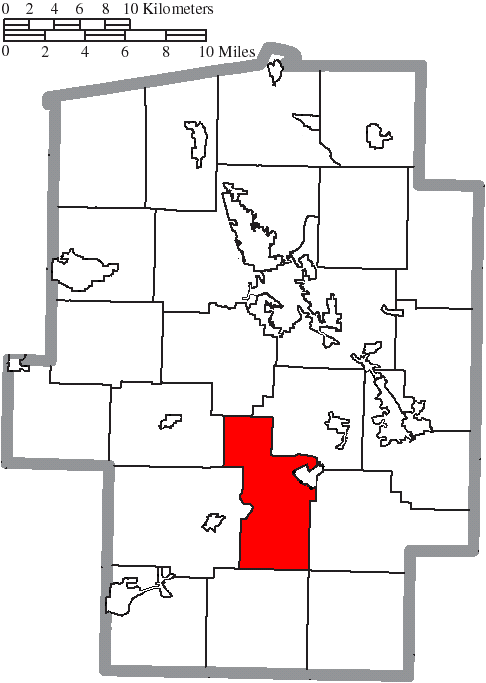
- Location of Clay Township in Tuscarawas County
- Coordinates: 40°21′23″N 81°27′9″W
- Country: United States
- State: Ohio
- County: Tuscarawas

Area
  - Total: 24.7 sq mi (63.9 km^{2})
  - Land: 24.2 sq mi (62.6 km^{2})
  - Water: 0.50 sq mi (1.3 km^{2})
- Elevation: 814 ft (248 m)

Population (2020)
  - Total: 1,942
  - Density: 80/sq mi (31/km^{2})
- Time zone: UTC-5 (Eastern (EST))
  - Summer (DST): UTC-4 (EDT)
- FIPS code: 39-15574
- GNIS feature ID: 1087052

Clay Township is one of the twenty-two townships of Tuscarawas County, Ohio, United States. The 2020 census found 1,942 people in the township.

== Geography ==
Located in the southern part of the county, it borders the following townships:

- York Township - north
- Warwick Township - northeast
- Rush Township - east
- Perry Township - southeast corner
- Washington Township - south
- Salem Township - southwest
- Jefferson Township - northwest

Part of the village of Gnadenhutten is located in eastern Clay Township.

Clay Township contains the unincorporated locale of Lock Seventeen., named for its location at the seventeenth lock of the Ohio Canal.

== Name and history ==
It is one of nine Clay Townships statewide.

== Government ==
The township is governed by a three-member board of trustees, who are elected in November of odd-numbered years to a four-year term beginning on the following January 1. Two are elected in the year after the presidential election and one is elected in the year before it. There is also an elected township fiscal officer, who serves a four-year term beginning on April 1 of the year after the election, which is held in November of the year before the presidential election. Vacancies in the fiscal officership or on the board of trustees are filled by the remaining trustees.
