= Bakersville, Ohio =

Unincorporated community in Ohio, U.S.

Coordinates: 40°21′20″N 81°38′44″W

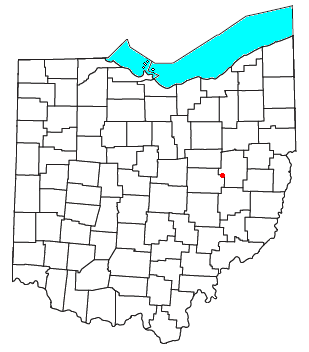
Location of Bakersville, Ohio

Bakersville is an unincorporated community in northeastern Adams Township, Coshocton County, Ohio, United States. It has a post office with the ZIP code 43803. It lies along State Route 751 northeast of West Lafayette.

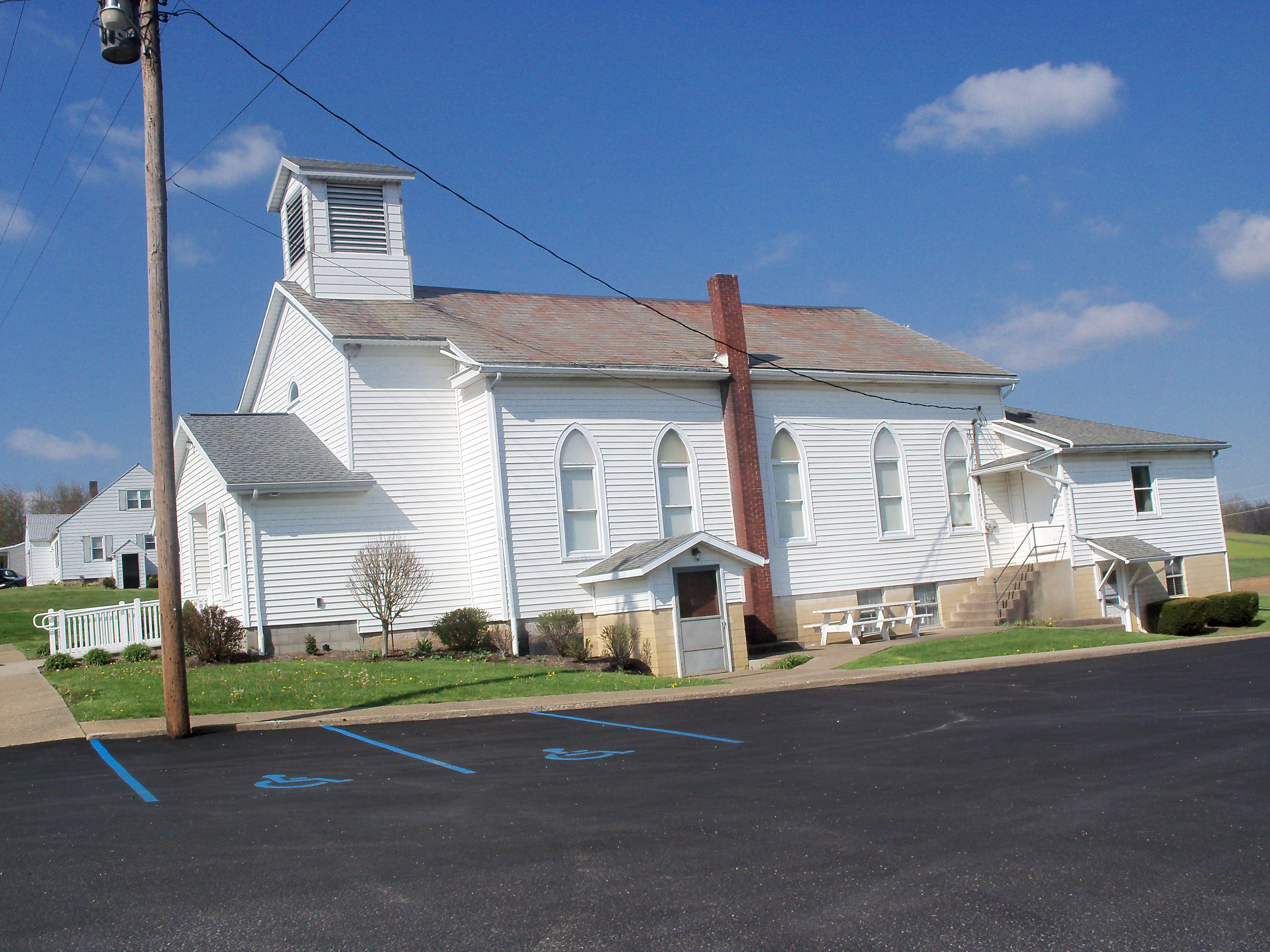
Bakersville Community Church

== History ==
Bakersville was laid out in 1848 by John Baker, and named for him. A post office was established at Bakersville in 1850, and remained in operation until 2002. At that time, the postal services were moved into the Bakersville Garage and maintained by two employees of their office staff.
