= Stone Creek, Ohio =

- Village
- Motto: "A Small Town With A Big Heart
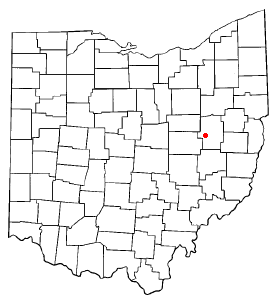
- Location of Stone Creek, Ohio

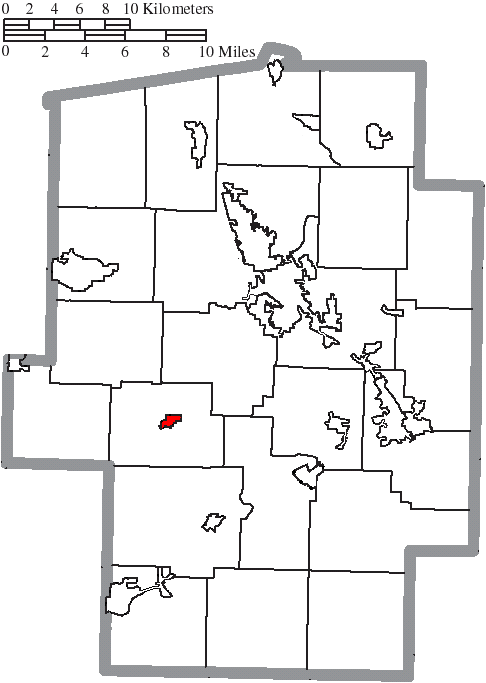
- Location of Stone Creek in Tuscarawas County
- Coordinates: 40°23′59″N 81°33′29″W
- Country: United States
- State: Ohio
- County: Tuscarawas
- Township: Jefferson
- Established: 1840
- Founder: Phillip Leonhardt

Government
  - Mayor: Leslie Kissinger

Area
  - Total: 0.42 sq mi (1.10 km^{2})
  - Land: 0.42 sq mi (1.10 km^{2})
  - Water: 0 sq mi (0.00 km^{2})
- Elevation: 922 ft (281 m)

Population (2020)
  - Total: 153
  - Density: 359.9/sq mi (138.94/km^{2})
- Time zone: UTC-5 (Eastern (EST))
  - Summer (DST): UTC-4 (EDT)
- ZIP code: 43840
- Area code: 330
- FIPS code: 39-74804
- GNIS feature ID: 2399907

Stone Creek is a village in Tuscarawas County, Ohio, United States. The population was 153 at the 2020 census.

== History ==
Because of its distance from principal streams, early settlers did not arrive to the valley until 1827 when John Hawk, who is credited as the first settler arrived. Other settlers soon followed thanks to the construction of the Ohio and Erie Canal through Tuscarawas County. These settlers were mostly of Germans descent, some of whom came directly from Germany, while others were second or third generation from citizens from Pennsylvania. Although the canal did not go through Jefferson Township, it still opened up many opportunities to the region. It allowed shipping to eastern markets and increased the price of farm produce such as wheat. This helped to stimulate the settlement of the area, since it was close enough to canal shipping points.

In the early years of the settlement, a resident by the name of Philip Burrier hauled loads of stone to create a passage across the creek for horses and wagons to cross. The residents then referred to this creek as “Stone Creek.” Thanks to this newly given name to the creek, when a post office was established on the property of Michael Harmon in 1840, it was named Stone Creek.

The first formal attempt to establish a town was made in 1848 when Adam Sherrets platted a site at the junction of Dott's Fork with Stone Creek. It ultimately failed, so the present town of Stone Creek was laid out in 1854 by Philip Leonhart and named Phillipsburg. This was later changed to Stone Creek. From here the town grew slowly until the construction of the Cleveland & Marietta Railroad through the town in the 1870s.

In 1904, village council members, Charlie Kughler and Fred Haas took the a train from the village to Akron to file incorporation papers for the village, only to discover that another Phillipsburg already existed in Ohio near Dayton. It was then they decided to name the village after the post office that had already been established there.

Stone Creek Jefferson School

The village at one time had its own school that served Jefferson Township. It was established as the result of several smaller school houses merging to form one central school one of which, the Angel Valley Schoolhouse still stands and has been preserved. The consolidated Stone Creek-Jefferson school building was erected in 1927. The school operated independently until 1965, when they were forced by the Ohio Department of Education to consolidated with a larger district, ultimately merging with the neighboring district, New Philadelphia City Schools. After the consolidation with the district, the Stone Creek school building housed an elementary school “Stone Creek Elementary,” as well as a steel and welding shop for the students of New Philadelphia High School who were bused out for their lab. The school was ultimately closed in 1974, with it being demolished on October 17, 1979.

The village still has its own volunteer fire department, which was officially established in 1949, although the building itself dates back further. Before this the town had a fire wagon that community members would use to fight fires.

== Geography ==
According to the United States Census Bureau, the village has a total area of 0.43 square miles (1.11 km^{2}), all land.

== Transportation ==
Interstate 77 intersects Stone Creek, while SR 751 starts here.

== Demographics ==
Historical population
Census	Pop.	Note	%±
1910	144		—
1920	133		−7.6%
1930	225		69.2%
1940	214		−4.9%
1950	225		5.1%
1960	226		0.4%
1970	171		−24.3%
1980	150		−12.3%
1990	181		20.7%
2000	184		1.7%
2010	177		−3.8%
2020	153		−13.6%
2021 (est.)	151	▼	−1.3%
U.S. Decennial Census

=== 2020 census ===
As of the census of 2020, there were 153 people and 62 households living in the village. The population density was 411.6 inhabitants per square mile (158.9/km^{2}). There were 71 housing units at an average density of 160.5 per square mile (62.0/km^{2}).

=== 2010 census ===
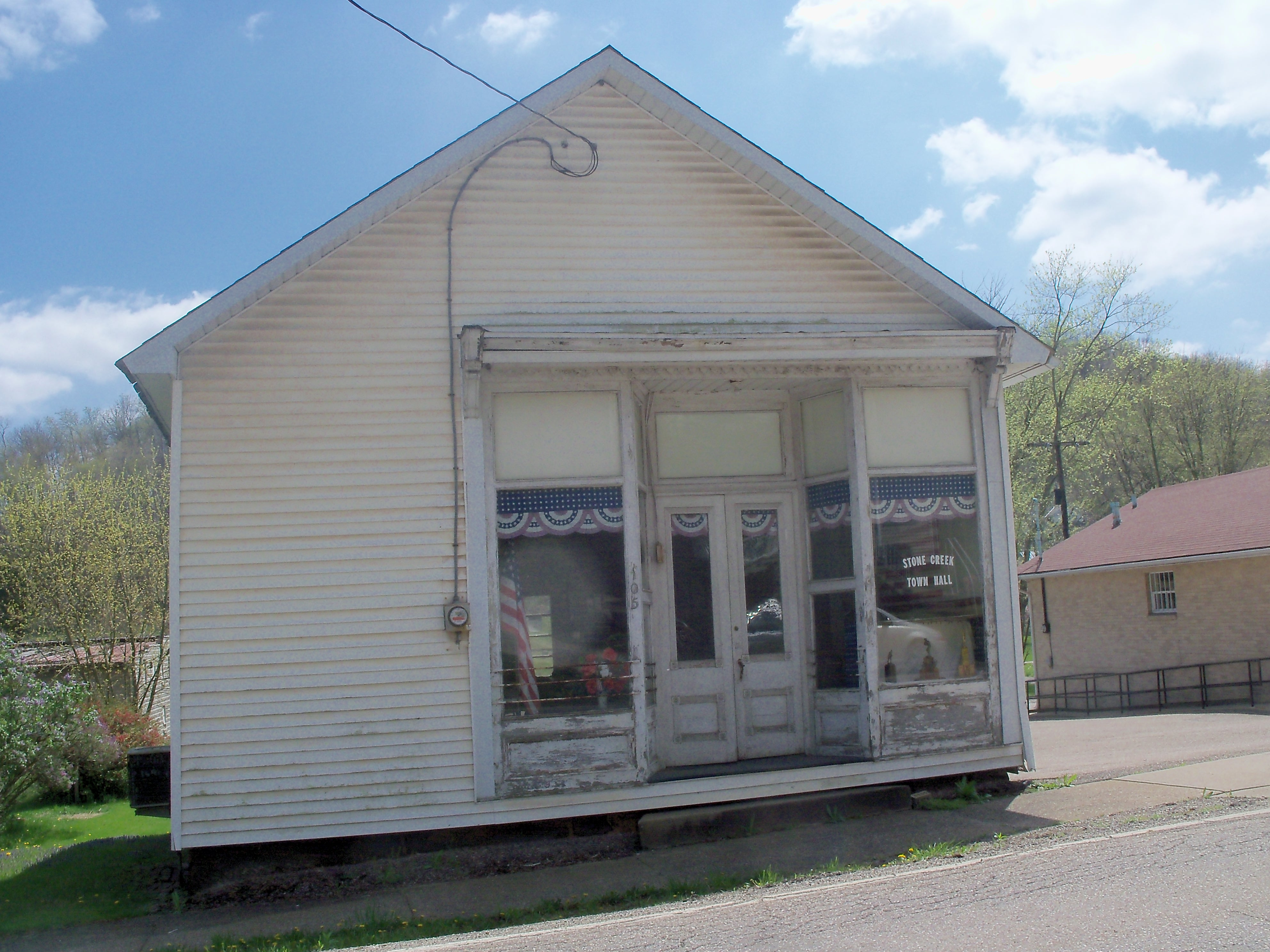
Town hall

As of the census of 2010, there were 177 people, 65 households, and 54 families living in the village. The population density was 411.6 inhabitants per square mile (158.9/km^{2}). There were 69 housing units at an average density of 160.5 per square mile (62.0/km^{2}). The racial makeup of the village was 97.7% White, 0.6% African American, 0.6% from other races, and 1.1% from two or more races. Hispanic or Latino of any race were 0.6% of the population.

There were 65 households, of which 38.5% had children under the age of 18 living with them, 66.2% were married couples living together, 9.2% had a female householder with no husband present, 7.7% had a male householder with no wife present, and 16.9% were non-families. 12.3% of all households were made up of individuals, and 4.6% had someone living alone who was 65 years of age or older. The average household size was 2.72 and the average family size was 2.96.

The median age in the village was 35.5 years. 24.3% of residents were under the age of 18; 12.3% were between the ages of 18 and 24; 26.5% were from 25 to 44; 23.6% were from 45 to 64; and 13% were 65 years of age or older. The gender makeup of the village was 53.1% male and 46.9% female.

=== 2000 census ===
As of the census of 2000, there were 184 people, 66 households, and 55 families living in the village. The population density was 426.9 inhabitants per square mile (164.8/km^{2}). There were 70 housing units at an average density of 162.4 per square mile (62.7/km^{2}). The racial makeup of the village was 100.00% White.

There were 66 households, out of which 47.0% had children under the age of 18 living with them, 66.7% were married couples living together, 10.6% had a female householder with no husband present, and 15.2% were non-families. 12.1% of all households were made up of individuals, and 9.1% had someone living alone who was 65 years of age or older. The average household size was 2.79 and the average family size was 3.05.

In the village, the population was spread out, with 32.6% under the age of 18, 7.6% from 18 to 24, 29.9% from 25 to 44, 14.7% from 45 to 64, and 15.2% who were 65 years of age or older. The median age was 34 years. For every 100 females there were 100.0 males. For every 100 females age 18 and over, there were 96.8 males.

The median income for a household in the village was $30,625, and the median income for a family was $31,250. Males had a median income of $35,625 versus $15,625 for females. The per capita income for the village was $15,308. About 10.0% of families and 8.8% of the population were below the poverty line, including 13.0% of those under the age of eighteen and 7.5% of those 65 or over.
