= Ohio State Route 751 =

State highway in Ohio, US

State Route 751

Route information
- Maintained by ODOT
- Length: 15.96 mi (25.69 km)
- Existed: 1962–present

Major junctions
- West end: SR 93 in West Lafayette
- US 36 near West Lafayette
- East end: I-77 in Stone Creek

Location
- Country: United States
- State: Ohio
- Counties: Coshocton, Tuscarawas

Highway system
- Ohio State Highway System; Interstate; US; State; Scenic
← SR 750	→ SR 752

State Route 751 (SR 751) is an east–west state highway located in the east-central portion of Ohio. The highway runs between its western terminus at SR 93 in West Lafayette and its eastern terminus at a diamond interchange with I-77 on the outskirts of the village of Stone Creek.

== Route description ==
SR 751 traverses portions of Coshocton and Tuscarawas Counties. There is no portion of this state highway that is included as a part of the National Highway System.

Notable Sites

- Roscoe Village in Coshocton

- Clary Gardens in Coshocton

- Wineries and Breweries

== History ==
The designation of SR 751 came in 1962 along what was formerly designated SR 75 between the current western terminus in West Lafayette and the intersection with Bridge Street (formerly U.S. Route 21) in Stone Creek. The route had been a part of the state highway system since 1912, though between 1912 and 1922, the route was numbered SR 408. The next year, the route between what is now County Road 9 in Oxford Township and Stone Creek became SR 75 and the final portion between West Lafayette and CR 9 became SR 75 by 1931. The entire route of what is now SR 751 became paved by 1939. With the construction of I-75 in the western part of the state, and the state's rule that no state highway number may duplicate an Interstate or U.S. route number, SR 75 was redesignated in part as an extension of SR 93 from West Lafayette south, and as the newly designated State Route 751 from West Lafayette to Stone Creek.

With the completion of I-77 around Stone Creek by 1971, and corresponding removal of US 21 from Ohio in that year, SR 751 was extended through Stone Creek from its previous eastern terminus along Bridge Street, then easterly from the split of Tuscarawas County Road 21 (former US 21) to its current eastern terminus at I-77's exit 73. No other significant changes have taken place to the routing of SR 751 since that extension.

== Major intersections ==
County	Location	mi	km	Destinations	Notes
Coshocton	West Lafayette	0.00	0.00	SR 93 (Plainfield Road / East Main Street)	
Coshocton	Oxford Township	4.01	6.45	US 36 – Warsaw, Newcomerstown	
Tuscarawas	Stone Creek	15.96	25.69	I-77 – Marietta, Cleveland	Exit 73 (I-77)
1.000 mi = 1.609 km; 1.000 km = 0.621 mi
