= York Center, Ohio =

- Unincorporated community
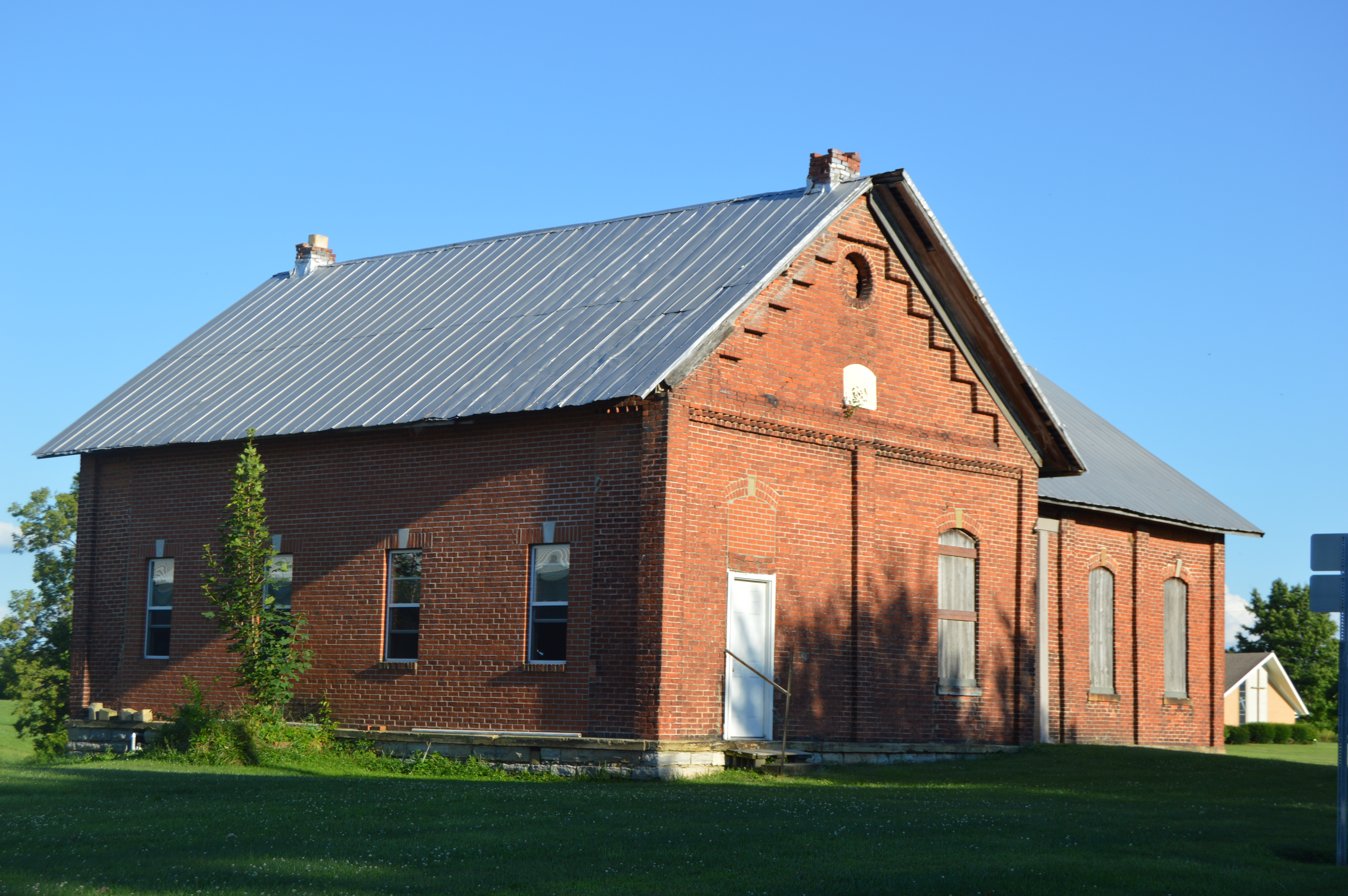
- School on State Route 739

- Location within Ohio
- Coordinates: 40°24′28″N 83°27′12″W
- Country: United States
- State: Ohio
- Counties: Union
- Elevation: 1,034 ft (315 m)
- Time zone: UTC-5 (Eastern (EST))
  - Summer (DST): UTC-4 (EDT)
- ZIP code: 43358
- Area codes: 937, 326
- GNIS feature ID: 1061808

York Center is an unincorporated community in York Township, Union County, Ohio, United States. It is located at the intersection of State Routes 47 and 739.

York Center was platted in 1841. A post office called York operated from 1844 until 1905. As of 1877, the community contained one store, one blacksmith shop, and one church.
