= Salem Township, Tuscarawas County, Ohio =

Township in Ohio, US

- Township
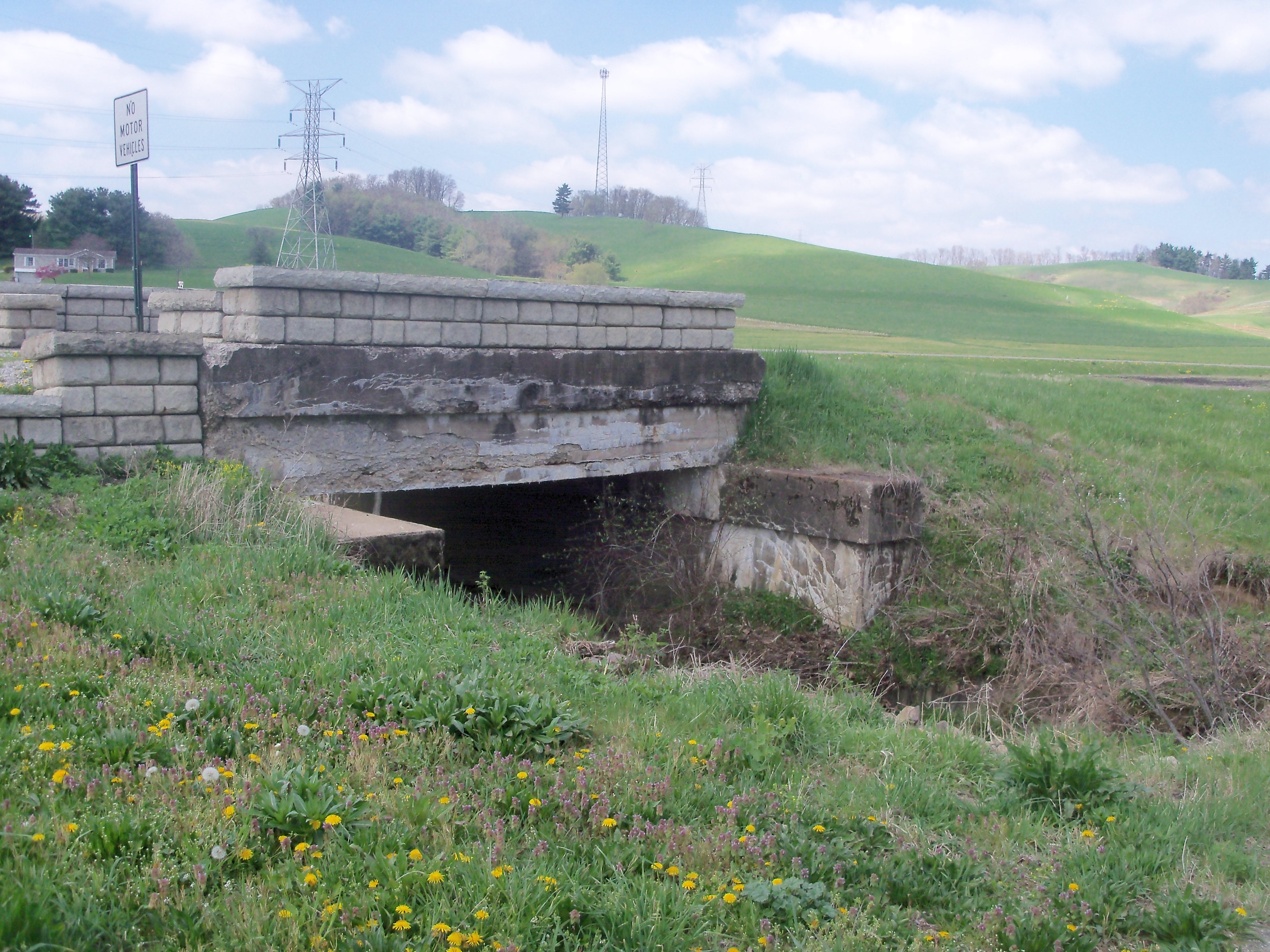
- A footbridge on Buckhorn Creek Trail south of Wolf

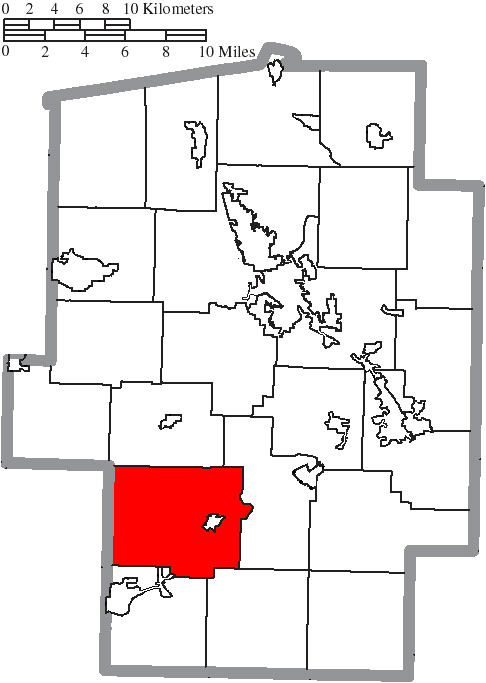
- Location of Salem Township in Tuscarawas County
- Coordinates: 40°19′45″N 81°33′9″W
- Country: United States
- State: Ohio
- County: Tuscarawas

Area
  - Total: 34.1 sq mi (88.4 km^{2})
  - Land: 33.9 sq mi (87.7 km^{2})
  - Water: 0.31 sq mi (0.8 km^{2})
- Elevation: 1,030 ft (314 m)

Population (2020)
  - Total: 1,584
  - Density: 47/sq mi (18.1/km^{2})
- Time zone: UTC-5 (Eastern (EST))
  - Summer (DST): UTC-4 (EDT)
- FIPS code: 39-69974
- GNIS feature ID: 1087064

Salem Township is one of the twenty-two townships of Tuscarawas County, Ohio, United States. The 2020 census found 1,584 people in the township.

== History ==
Salem Township derives its name from the town of the same name mentioned in the Bible. The settlement of Salem, among the first in the Northwest Territory, was founded by a group of Moravian Christians, both European and Native American (Christian Munsee and Christian Mohican), led by the Christian missionary John Heckewelder.

It is one of fourteen Salem Townships statewide.

== Geography ==
Located in the southwestern part of the county, it borders the following townships:

- Jefferson Township - north
- Clay Township - east
- Washington Township - southeast
- Oxford Township - south
- Oxford Township, Coshocton County - southwest corner
- Adams Township, Coshocton County - west

The village of Port Washington is located in eastern Salem Township.

== Government ==
The township is governed by a three-member board of trustees, who are elected in November of odd-numbered years to a four-year term beginning on the following January 1. Two are elected in the year after the presidential election and one is elected in the year before it. There is also an elected township fiscal officer, who serves a four-year term beginning on April 1 of the year after the election, which is held in November of the year before the presidential election. Vacancies in the fiscal officership or on the board of trustees are filled by the remaining trustees.
