= York Township, Tuscarawas County, Ohio =

Township in Ohio, US

- Township
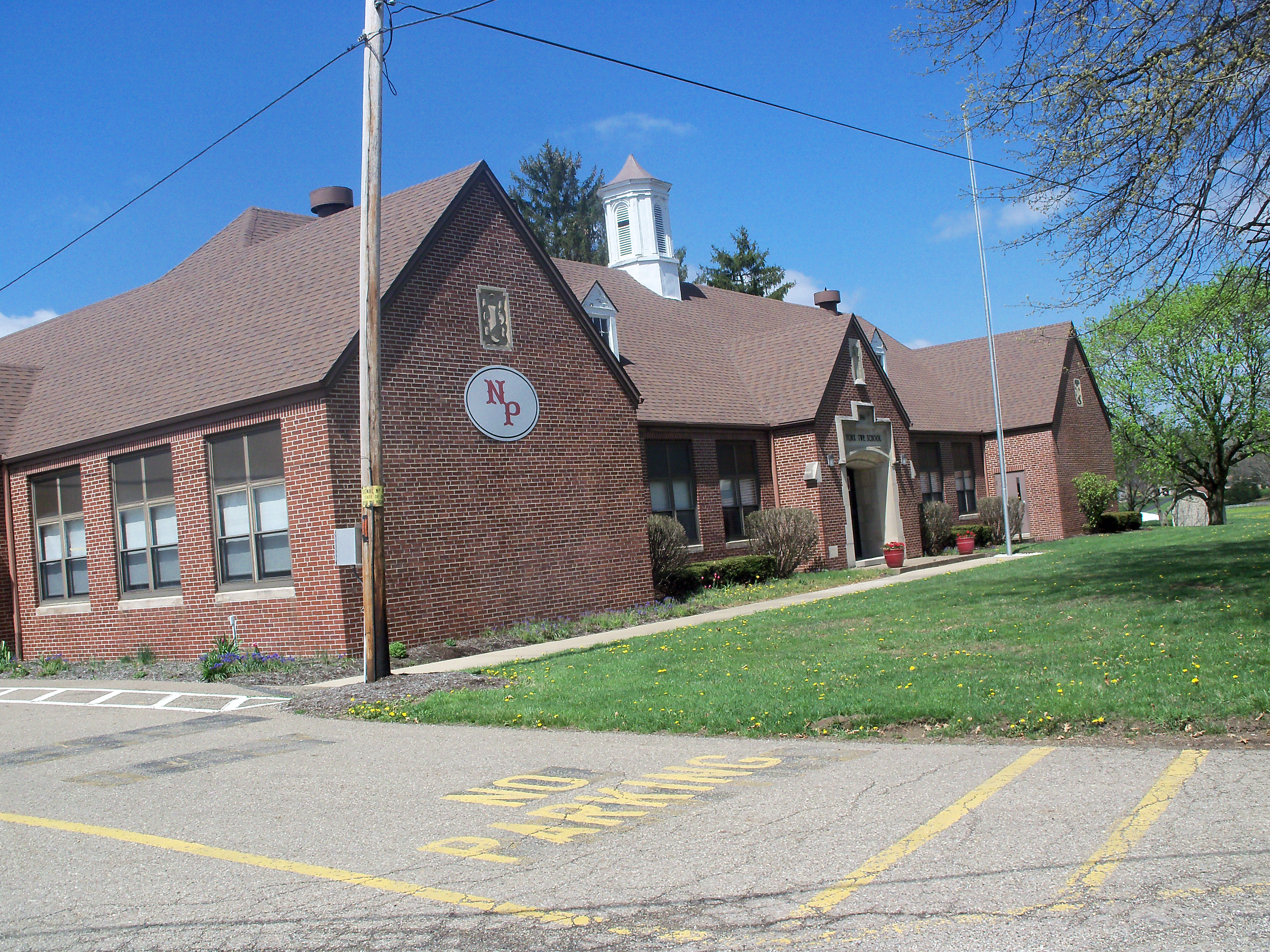
- York Township School (1941)

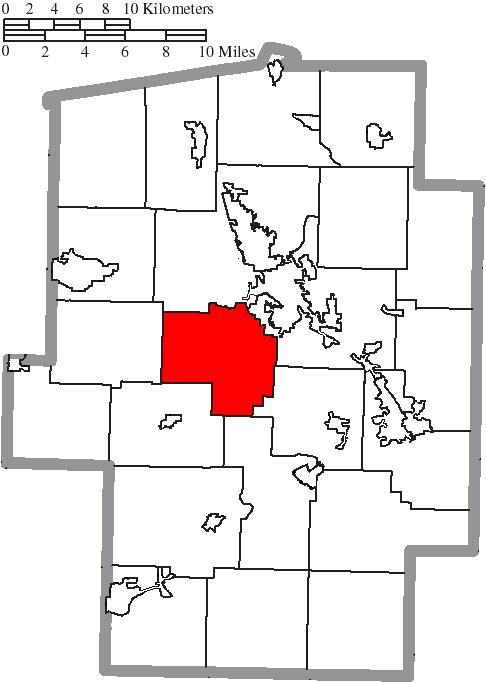
- Location of York Township in Tuscarawas County
- Coordinates: 40°26′46″N 81°30′37″W
- Country: United States
- State: Ohio
- County: Tuscarawas

Area
  - Total: 23.7 sq mi (61.3 km^{2})
  - Land: 23.6 sq mi (61.2 km^{2})
  - Water: 0.039 sq mi (0.1 km^{2})
- Elevation: 1,001 ft (305 m)

Population (2020)
  - Total: 1,392
  - Density: 56/sq mi (21.7/km^{2})
- Time zone: UTC-5 (Eastern (EST))
  - Summer (DST): UTC-4 (EDT)
- FIPS code: 39-87094
- GNIS feature ID: 1087072

York Township is one of the twenty-two townships of Tuscarawas County, Ohio, United States. The 2020 census found 1,392 people in the township.

== Geography ==
Located at the center of the county, it borders the following townships:

- Dover Township - north
- Goshen Township - northeast
- Warwick Township - southeast
- Clay Township - south
- Jefferson Township - southwest
- Auburn Township - west

No municipalities are located in York Township.

== Name and history ==
It is one of ten York Townships statewide.

York Township was organized in 1828. The township was named after York, Pennsylvania.

== Government ==
The township is governed by a three-member board of trustees, who are elected in November of odd-numbered years to a four-year term beginning on the following January 1. Two are elected in the year after the presidential election and one is elected in the year before it. There is also an elected township fiscal officer, who serves a four-year term beginning on April 1 of the year after the election, which is held in November of the year before the presidential election. Vacancies in the fiscal officership or on the board of trustees are filled by the remaining trustees.
