= Auburn Township, Tuscarawas County, Ohio =

Township in Ohio, US

- Township
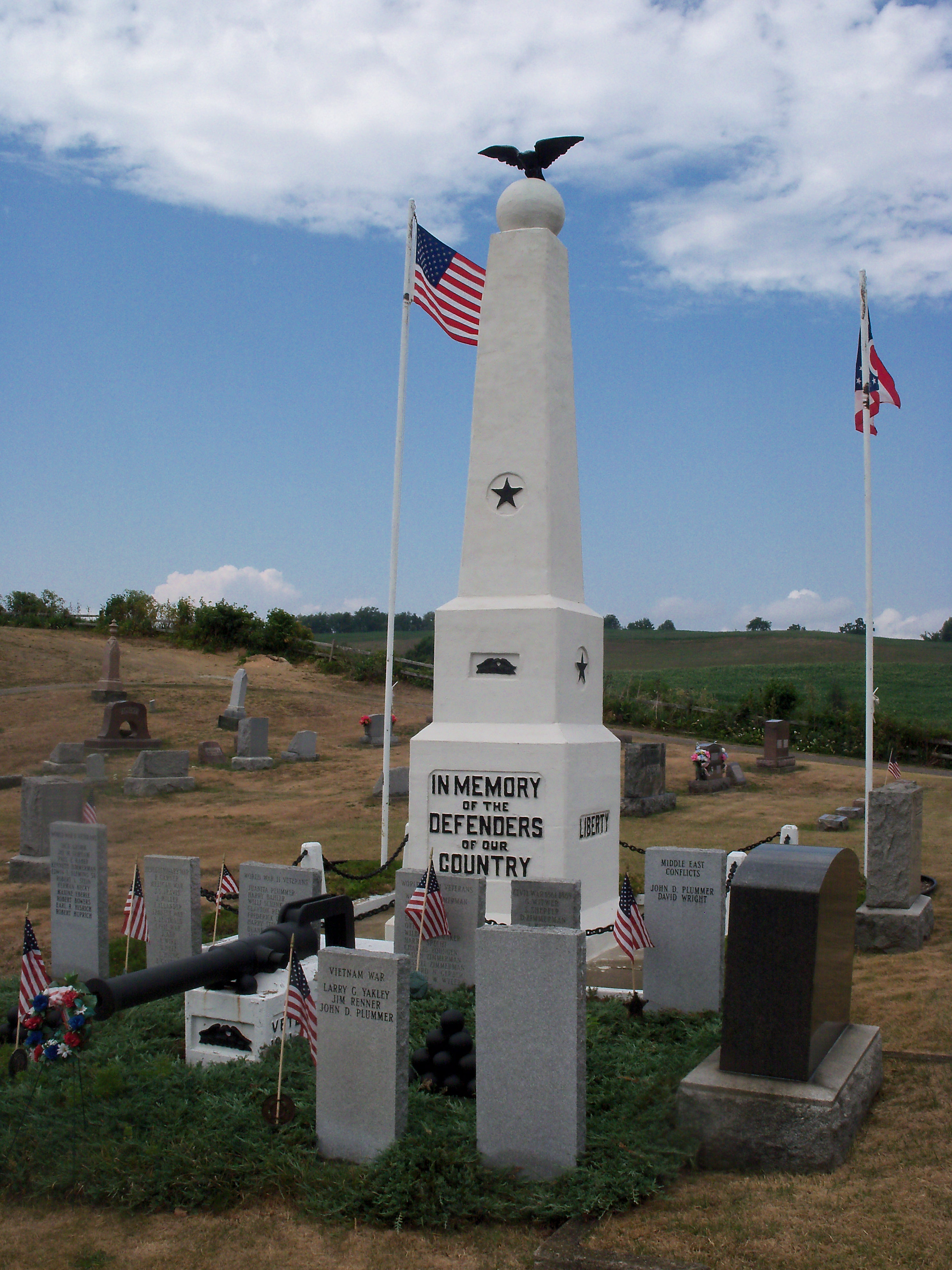
- Veterans memorial at Ragersville

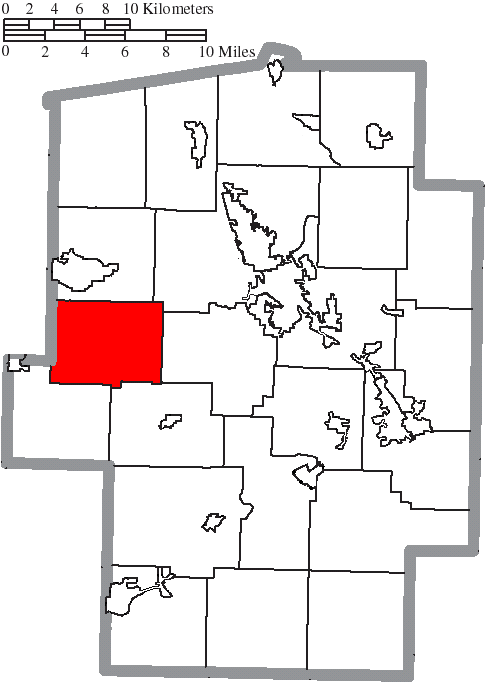
- Location of Auburn Township in Tuscarawas County
- Coordinates: 40°27′41″N 81°37′15″W
- Country: United States
- State: Ohio
- County: Tuscarawas

Area
  - Total: 22.5 sq mi (58.3 km^{2})
  - Land: 22.5 sq mi (58.3 km^{2})
  - Water: 0 sq mi (0.0 km^{2})
- Elevation: 1,047 ft (319 m)

Population (2020)
  - Total: 1,109
  - Density: 49.3/sq mi (19.0/km^{2})
- Time zone: UTC-5 (Eastern (EST))
  - Summer (DST): UTC-4 (EDT)
- FIPS code: 39-02918
- GNIS feature ID: 1087050

Historical population
Census	Pop.	Note	%±
1990	820		—
2000	1,078		31.5%
2010	1,070		−0.7%
2020	1,109		3.6%
U.S. Census:

Auburn Township is one of the twenty-two townships of Tuscarawas County, Ohio, United States. The 2020 census found 1,109 people in the township.

== Geography ==
Located in the western part of the county, it borders the following townships:

- Sugar Creek Township - north
- Dover Township - northeast
- York Township - east
- Jefferson Township - southeast
- Bucks Township - southwest
- Clark Township, Holmes County - northwest

No municipalities are located in Auburn Township.

== Name and history ==
Statewide, other Auburn Townships are located in Crawford and Geauga counties.

== Government ==
The township is governed by a three-member board of trustees, who are elected in November of odd-numbered years to a four-year term beginning on the following January 1. Two are elected in the year after the presidential election and one is elected in the year before it. There is also an elected township fiscal officer, who serves a four-year term beginning on April 1 of the year after the election, which is held in November of the year before the presidential election. Vacancies in the fiscal officership or on the board of trustees are filled by the remaining trustees. The current trustees are Bruce Hanna, Dale Krebs, and Ralph Sundheimer Jr., and the fiscal officer is Alan Youngen.
