= York Township, Sandusky County, Ohio =

Township in Ohio, US

- Township
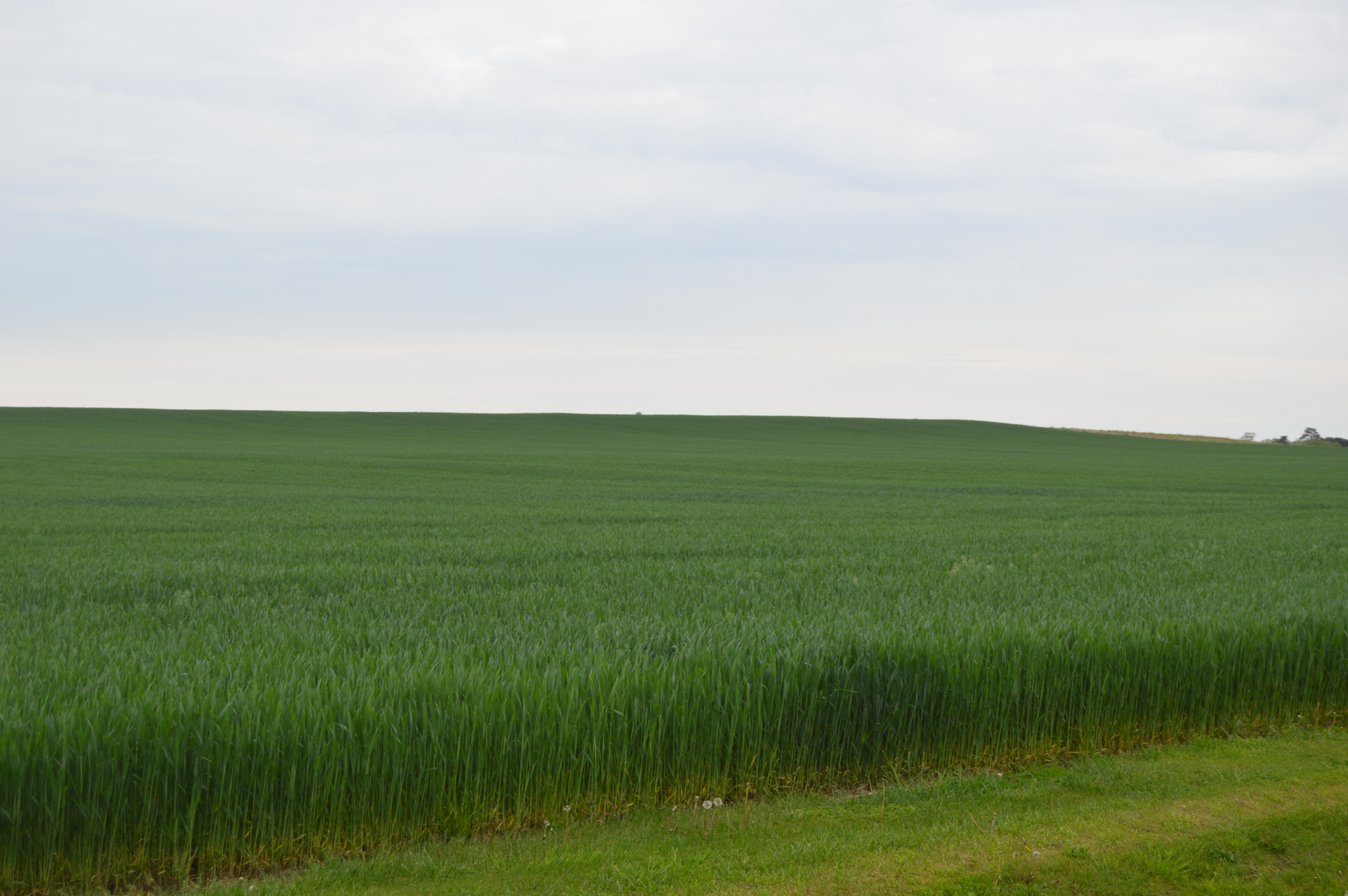
- Wheat field on Southwest Road

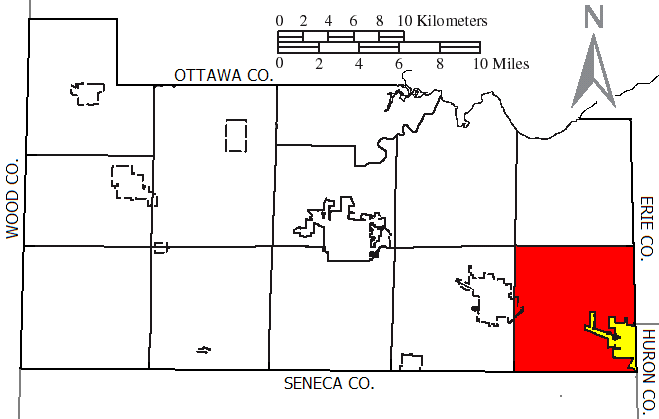
- Location of York Township, Sandusky County, Ohio.
- Coordinates: 41°17′24″N 82°54′28″W
- Country: United States
- State: Ohio
- County: Sandusky

Area
  - Total: 32.9 sq mi (85.1 km^{2})
  - Land: 32.9 sq mi (85.1 km^{2})
  - Water: 0 sq mi (0.0 km^{2})
- Elevation: 738 ft (225 m)

Population (2020)
  - Total: 2,479
  - Density: 75.4/sq mi (29.1/km^{2})
- Time zone: UTC-5 (Eastern (EST))
  - Summer (DST): UTC-4 (EDT)
- FIPS code: 39-87080
- GNIS feature ID: 1086921
- Website: https://www.yorktwp.com/

York Township is one of the twelve townships of Sandusky County, Ohio, United States. As of the 2020 census, 2,479 people lived in the township.

== Geography ==
Located in the southeastern corner of the county, it borders the following townships:

- Townsend Township - north
- Groton Township, Erie County - northeast
- Lyme Township, Huron County - southeast
- Thompson Township, Seneca County - south
- Adams Township, Seneca County - southwest corner
- Green Creek Township - west
- Riley Township - northwest corner

Parts of two cities are located in York Township: Bellevue in the southeast, and Clyde in the west.

== Name and history ==
It is one of ten York Townships statewide.

== Government ==
The township is governed by a three-member board of trustees, who are elected in November of odd-numbered years to a four-year term beginning on the following January 1. Two are elected in the year after the presidential election and one is elected in the year before it. There is also an elected township fiscal officer, who serves a four-year term beginning on April 1 of the year after the election, which is held in November of the year before the presidential election. Vacancies in the fiscal officership or on the board of trustees are filled by the remaining trustees.

== Notable people ==
- George W. Norris, U.S. Senator from Nebraska
