= Jackson Township, Union County, Ohio =

Township in Ohio, US

- Township
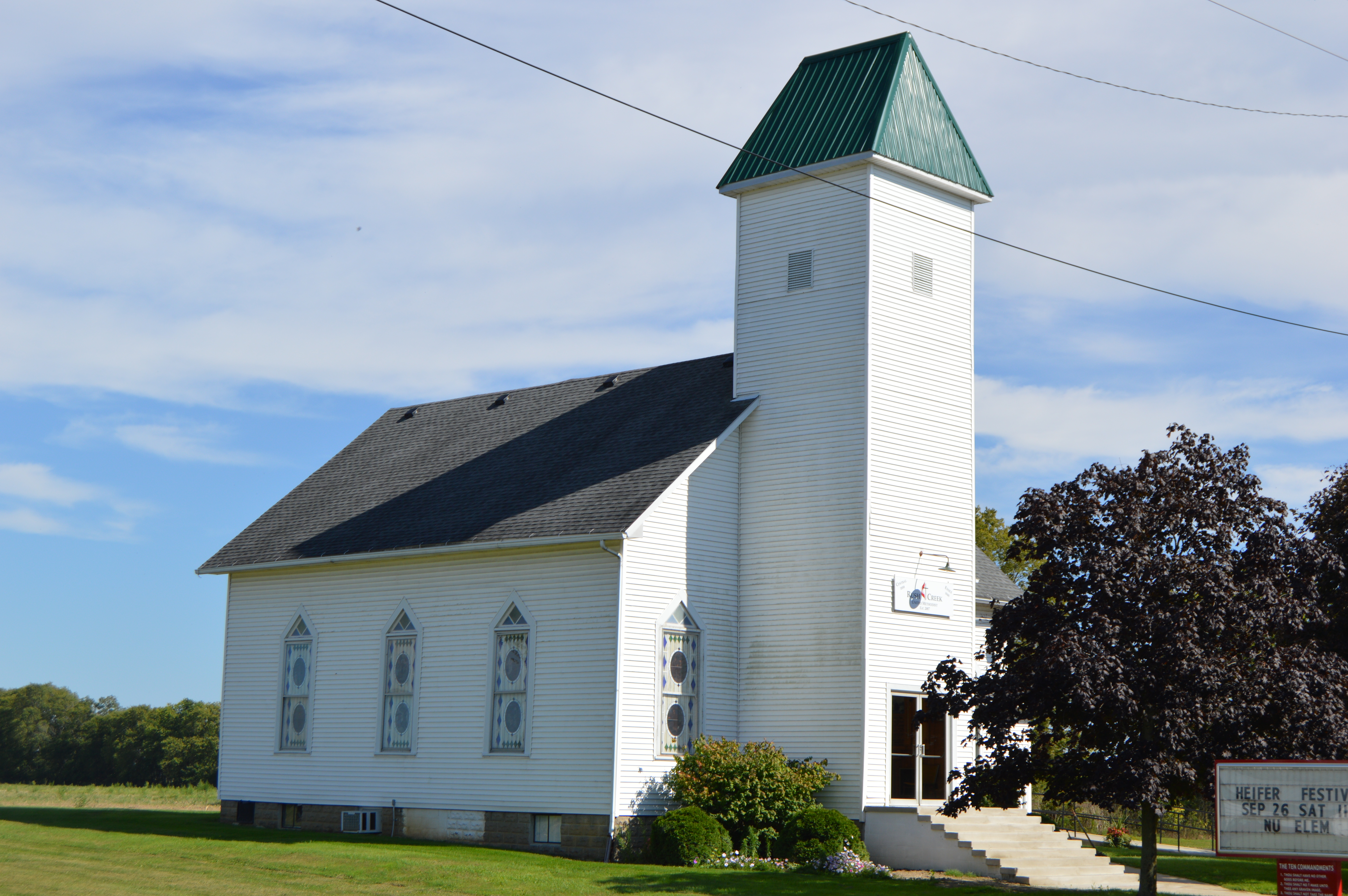
- Methodist church at Essex

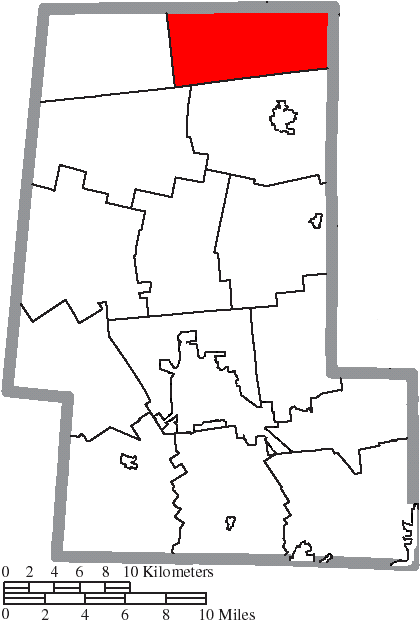
- Location of Jackson Township in Union County
- Coordinates: 40°29′16″N 83°20′7″W
- Country: United States
- State: Ohio
- County: Union

Area
  - Total: 28.0 sq mi (72.6 km^{2})
  - Land: 28.0 sq mi (72.6 km^{2})
  - Water: 0 sq mi (0.0 km^{2})
- Elevation: 961 ft (293 m)

Population (2020)
  - Total: 954
  - Density: 34.0/sq mi (13.1/km^{2})
- Time zone: UTC-5 (Eastern (EST))
  - Summer (DST): UTC-4 (EDT)
- FIPS code: 39-38108
- GNIS feature ID: 1087077

Jackson Township is one of the fourteen townships of Union County, Ohio, United States. The 2020 census found 954 people in the township.

== Geography ==
Located in the northwestern corner of the county, it borders the following townships:

- Bowling Green Township, Marion County - north
- Green Camp Township, Marion County - northeast
- Prospect Township, Marion County - east
- Claibourne Township - south
- York Township - southwest
- Washington Township - west

No municipalities are located in Jackson Township.

== Name and history ==
Jackson Township was organized in 1829. It is one of thirty-seven Jackson Townships statewide.

== Government ==
The township is governed by a three-member board of trustees, who are elected in November of odd-numbered years to a four-year term beginning on the following January 1. Two are elected in the year after the presidential election and one is elected in the year before it. There is also an elected township fiscal officer, who serves a four-year term beginning on April 1 of the year after the election, which is held in November of the year before the presidential election. Vacancies in the fiscal officership or on the board of trustees are filled by the remaining trustees.
