= Byhalia, Ohio =

- Unincorporated community
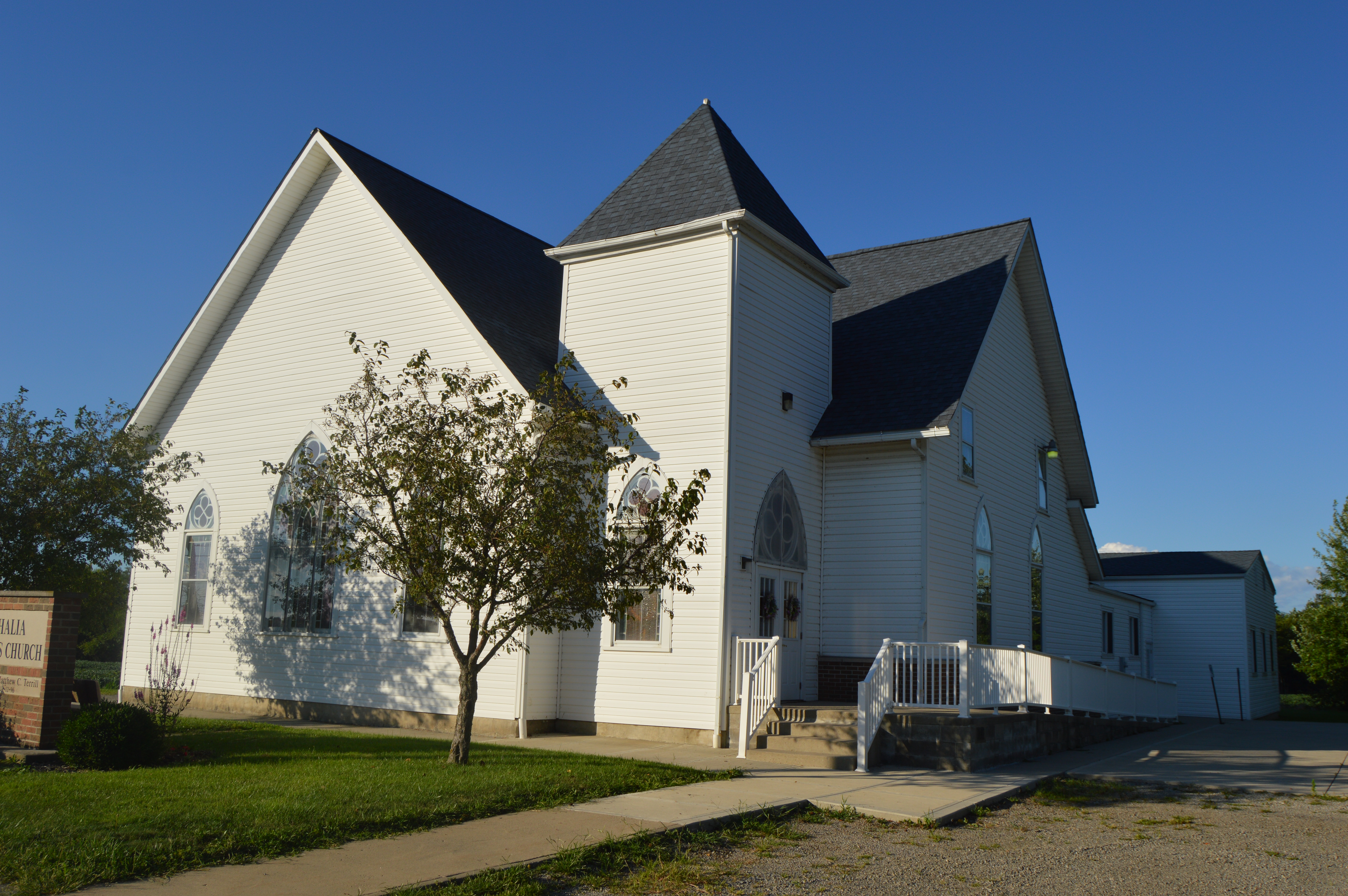
- Byhalia Friends Church

- Location within Ohio
- Coordinates: 40°27′13″N 83°27′20″W
- Country: United States
- State: Ohio
- Counties: Union
- Elevation: 1,030 ft (310 m)
- Time zone: UTC-5 (Eastern (EST))
  - Summer (DST): UTC-4 (EDT)
- ZIP code: 43358
- Area codes: 937, 326
- GNIS feature ID: 1048573

Byhalia is an unincorporated community in Washington Township, Union County, Ohio, United States. It is located the intersection of State Routes 31 and 739.

The Byhalia Post office was established on February 16, 1852. As of 1877, the community contained one store, one physician, and one sawmill. The post office was discontinued on February 14, 1906. The mail service is now sent through the Richwood branch.
