= Ohio State Route 31 =

State highway in Ohio, US

State Route 31

Route information
- Maintained by ODOT
- Length: 32.12 mi (51.69 km)
- Existed: 1926–present

Major junctions
- South end: SR 38 in Marysville
- US 33 / US 36 / SR 4 in Marysville
- North end: US 68 in Kenton

Location
- Country: United States
- State: Ohio
- Counties: Union, Hardin

Highway system
- Ohio State Highway System; Interstate; US; State; Scenic
← US 30S	→ SR 32

State Route 31 (SR 31) is a 32.12-mile-long (51.69 km) Ohio State Route that runs between Marysville and Kenton in the US state of Ohio. The southern terminus of SR 31 is at an intersection with SR 38 in downtown Marysville and the northern terminus is at an intersection with U.S. Route 68 (US 68), in downtown Kenton. None of the highway is listed on the National Highway System. Most of the route is a rural two-lane highway and passes through both farmland and residential properties.

The highway was first signed in 1926 on much of the same alignment as today. SR 31 replaced the SR 21 designation of the highway which dated back to 1923; SR 21 ran between Pomeroy and Findlay. Some of the route became US 68 in 1933, with another section becoming US 33 in 1938. The southern terminus was relocated to Columbus in the late 1930s and in the early 1940s the southern terminus was moved to Marysville. The northern terminus was moved to Kenton in the early 1950s.

== Route description ==
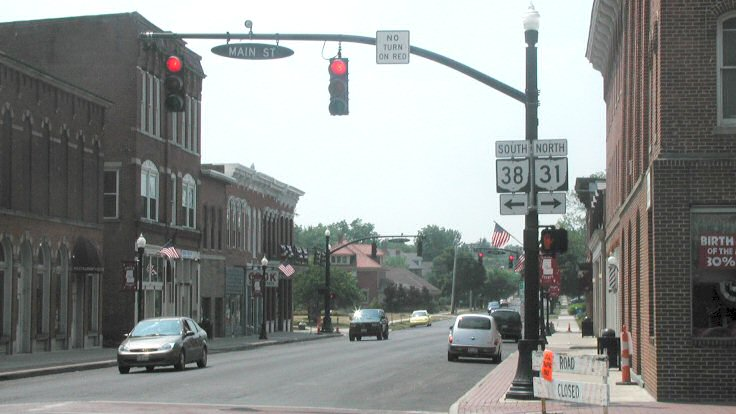
Southern terminus in Marysville.

SR 31 begins at an intersection with SR 38 in downtown Marysville. The highway heads north, on Main Street, through downtown Marysville, as a two-lane highway. The route leaves downtown by crossing CSX railroad tracks. After the tracks the road makes a turn heading northwest, onto Elwood Avenue, passing through residential properties. The road curves towards the north and has an interchange with U.S. Route 33 (US 33). SR 31 leaves Marysville, heading towards the northwest, passing through farmland, as a two-lane highway. The route has intersections with SR 347 and SR 47. The highway has a T-intersection with SR 739. SR 31 and SR 739 head northwest, before SR 739 turns northeast, leaving SR 31. After SR 739, SR 31 enters Hardin County.

In Hardin County, SR 31 enters Mt. Victory, from the southeast heading northwest. The highway has an at-grade crossing CSX railroad tracks, before entering downtown Mt. Victory. The road passes through residential properties, before leaving Mt. Victory. Northwest of Mt. Victory, SR 31 passes through farmland, heading towards Kenton. The road crosses over railroad tracks, before entering Kenton. As the road enters Kenton it is locally known as Main Street and has a T-intersection with SR 292. The road passes through industrial properties, before crossing CSX railroad tracks. After the tracks the road begins a concurrency with SR 53.

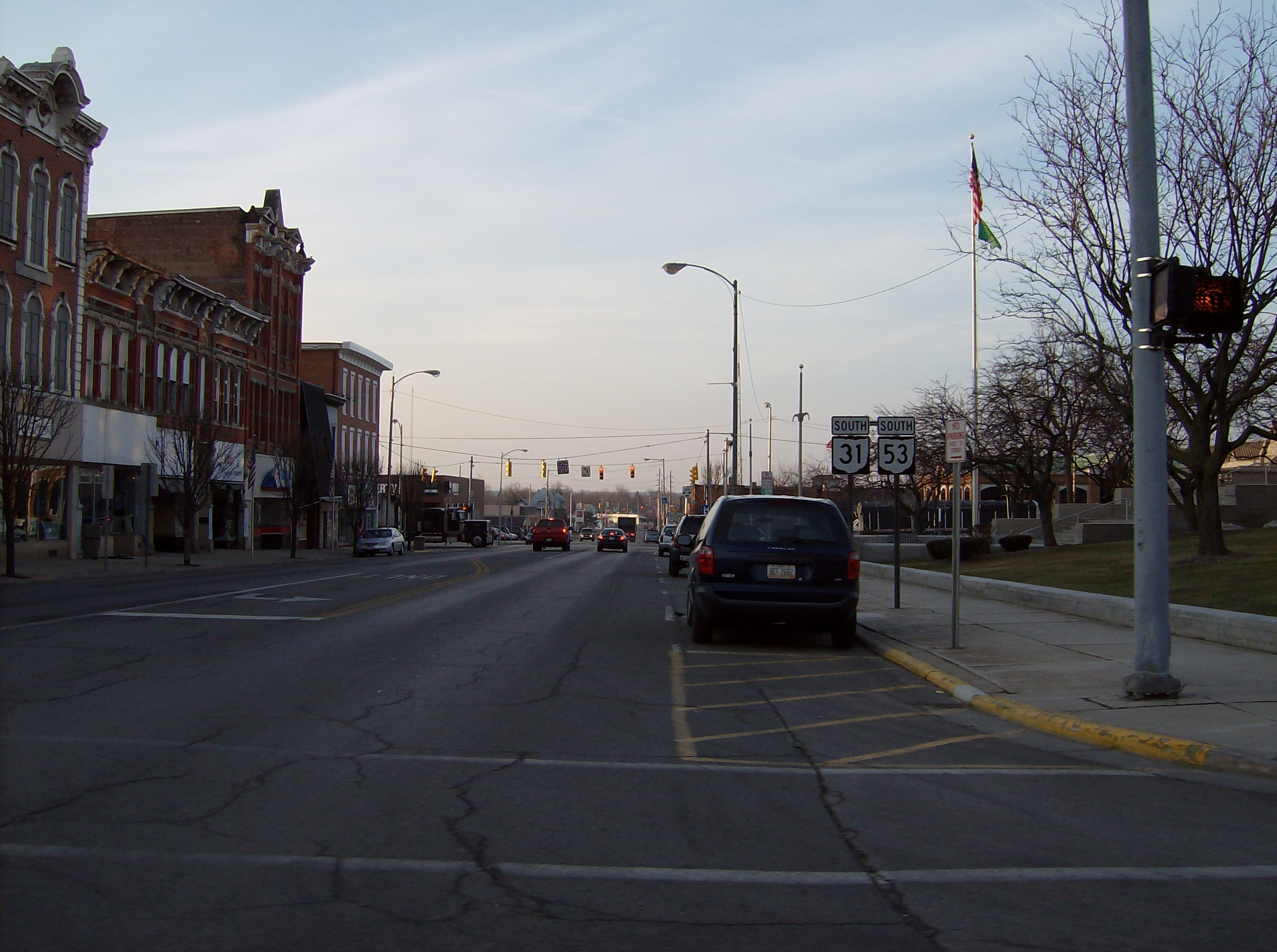
Near the northern terminus in Kenton.

The concurrency crosses over the Scioto River and has an at-grade crossing with CSX railroad tracks, before entering downtown Kenton. In downtown Kenton SR 31 and SR 53, is still known as Main Street and is one block east of US 68. The highway has an intersection with SR 309, on the southeast corner of the Hardin Country Court House. The road passes on the east side of the court house, before having an intersection with SR 67. The concurrency ends one block north of the court house, with SR 31 turning due west and SR 53 continuing due north. SR 31 heads west for one block on Carrol Street, before ending at US 68. The highway is not incorporated within the National Highway System.

== History ==
The first highway along the current SR 31 route was SR 21. In 1923, SR 21 was routed between Pomeroy and Findlay. The route between Pomeroy and Marysville is along the current US 33 corridor, with the section between Kenton and Findlay along the current US 68 corridor. The route number was changed to SR 31 in 1927. In 1932, SR 10 was commissioned concurrent with SR 31 between Kenton and Findlay. SR 10 became US 68 in 1933. US 33 replaced SR 31 between Pomeroy and Columbus in 1938; from Columbus to Marysville US 33 became concurrent with SR 31, except within Columbus, where US 33 and SR 31 followed different streets. The southern terminus was moved to Marysville in 1942, removing the concurrency with US 33. In 1951 the concurrency with US 68 was removed, making Kenton the northern terminus of SR 31.

== Major intersections ==
County	Location	mi	km	Destinations	Notes
Union	Marysville	0.00	0.00	SR 38 south (South Main Street) / Fifth Street	Northern terminus of SR 38
Union	Marysville	1.35	2.17	US 33 / US 36 / SR 4	
Union	Broadway	7.79	12.54	SR 347	
Union	York Township	11.86	19.09	SR 47 – Bellefontaine, Richwood	
Union	Byhalia	15.63	25.15	SR 739 south	Southern terminus of SR 739 concurrency
Union	Byhalia	16.24	26.14	SR 739 north – Marion	Northern terminus of SR 739 concurrency
Hardin	Mount Victory	22.91	36.87	SR 273 west (Taylor Street)	Eastern terminus of SR 273
Hardin	Kenton	30.56	49.18	SR 292 south	Northern terminus of SR 292
Hardin	Kenton	31.52	50.73	SR 53 south (Espy Street)	Southern terminus of SR 53 concurrency
Hardin	Kenton	31.91	51.35	SR 309 (East Franklin Street)	
Hardin	Kenton	31.98	51.47	SR 67 (East Columbus Street)	
Hardin	Kenton	32.05	51.58	SR 53 north (North Main Street)	Northern terminus of SR 53 concurrency
Hardin	Kenton	32.12	51.69	US 68 (North Detroit Street) / West Carrol Street	
1.000 mi = 1.609 km; 1.000 km = 0.621 mi: Concurrency terminus
