= York Township, Union County, Ohio =

Township in Ohio, US

- Township
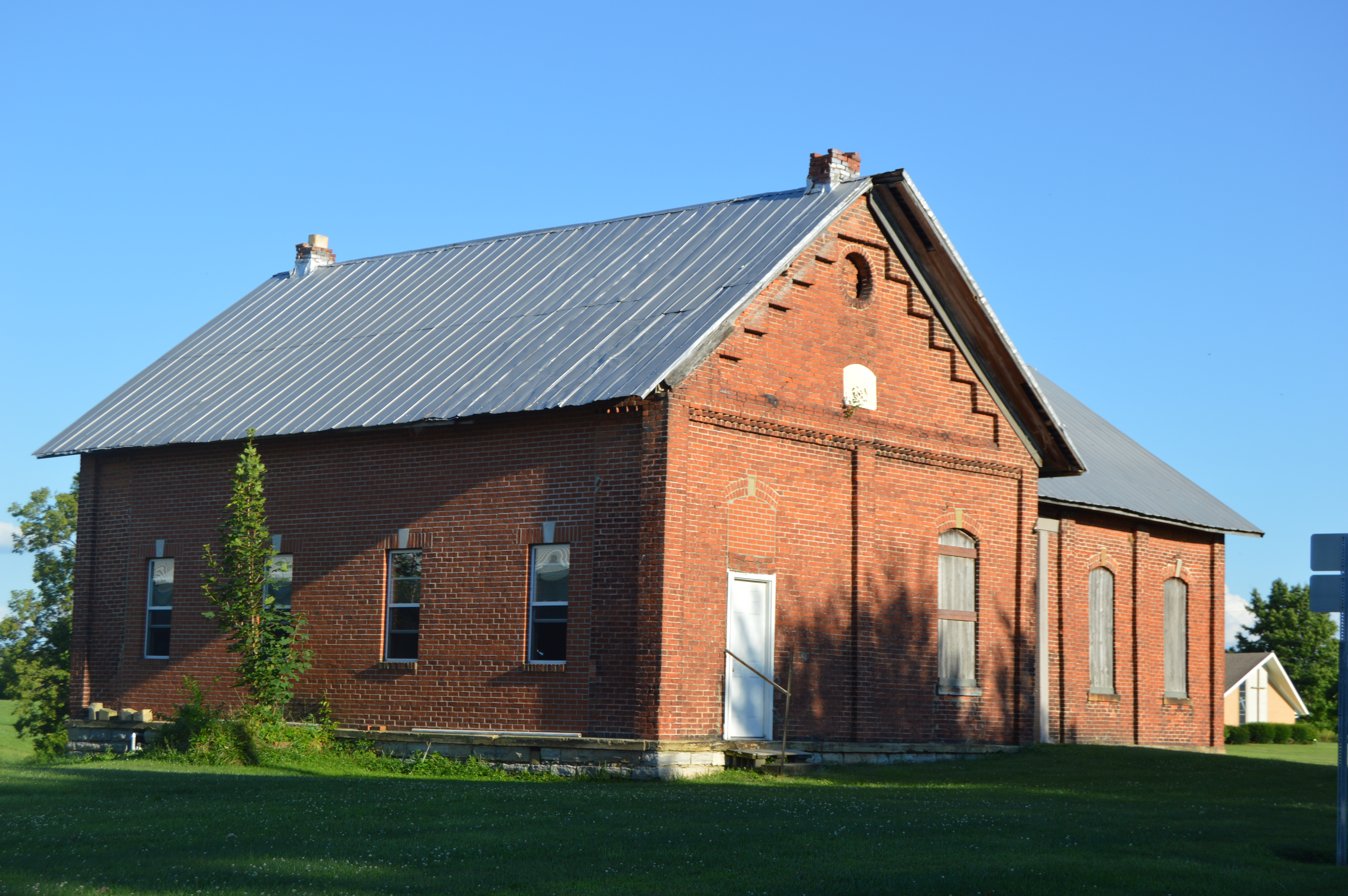
- School at York Center

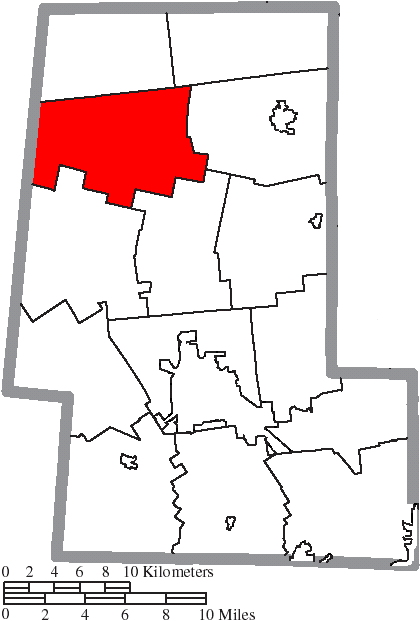
- Location of York Township in Union County
- Coordinates: 40°24′41″N 83°27′31″W
- Country: United States
- State: Ohio
- County: Union

Area
  - Total: 37.5 sq mi (97.1 km^{2})
  - Land: 37.5 sq mi (97.1 km^{2})
  - Water: 0.039 sq mi (0.1 km^{2})
- Elevation: 1,007 ft (307 m)

Population (2020)
  - Total: 1,341
  - Density: 35.8/sq mi (13.8/km^{2})
- Time zone: UTC-5 (Eastern (EST))
  - Summer (DST): UTC-4 (EDT)
- FIPS code: 39-87122
- GNIS feature ID: 1087086

York Township is one of the fourteen townships of Union County, Ohio, United States. The 2020 census found 1,341 people in the township.

== Geography ==
Located in the northwestern part of the county, it borders the following townships:

- Washington Township - north
- Jackson Township - northeast
- Claibourne Township - east
- Taylor Township - southeast
- Liberty Township - south
- Perry Township, Logan County - southwest
- Bokes Creek Township, Logan County - northwest

No municipalities are located in York Township, although it has the unincorporated communities of Somersville and York Center.

== Name and history ==
It is one of ten York Townships statewide. The township was organized in 1834.

== Government ==
The township is governed by a three-member board of trustees, who are elected in November of odd-numbered years to a four-year term beginning on the following January 1. Two are elected in the year after the presidential election and one is elected in the year before it. There is also an elected township fiscal officer, who serves a four-year term beginning on April 1 of the year after the election, which is held in November of the year before the presidential election. Vacancies in the fiscal officership or on the board of trustees are filled by the remaining trustees.
