= Washington Township, Union County, Ohio =

Township in Ohio, US

- Township
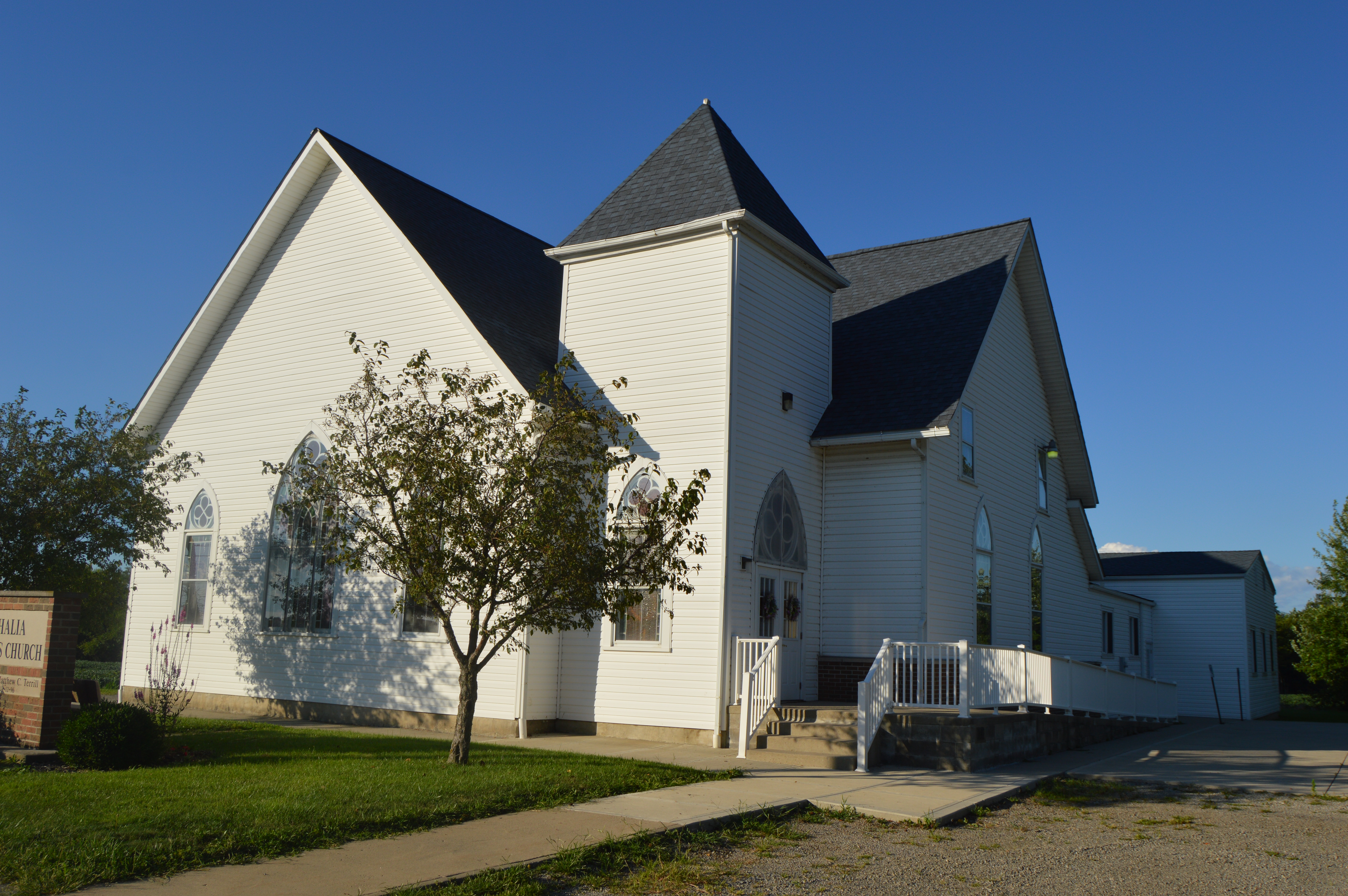
- Byhalia Friends Church

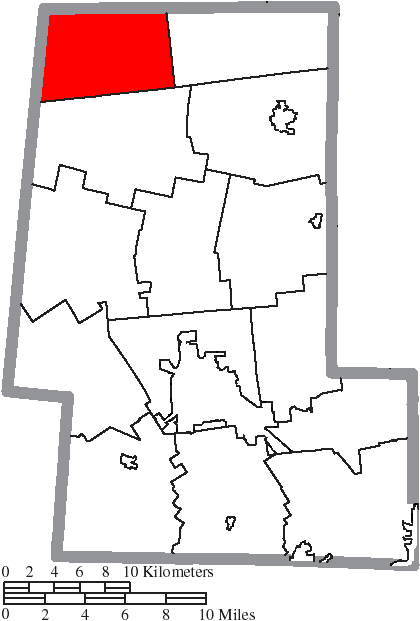
- Location of Washington Township in Union County
- Coordinates: 40°28′30″N 83°27′11″W
- Country: United States
- State: Ohio
- County: Union

Area
  - Total: 27.8 sq mi (72.1 km^{2})
  - Land: 27.8 sq mi (72.1 km^{2})
  - Water: 0 sq mi (0.0 km^{2})
- Elevation: 1,020 ft (311 m)

Population (2020)
  - Total: 812
  - Density: 29.2/sq mi (11.3/km^{2})
- Time zone: UTC-5 (Eastern (EST))
  - Summer (DST): UTC-4 (EDT)
- FIPS code: 39-81662
- GNIS feature ID: 1087085
- Website: https://washingtontwpbyhalia.org/

Washington Township is one of the fourteen townships of Union County, Ohio, United States. The 2020 census found 812 people in the township.

== Geography ==
Located in the northwestern corner of the county, it borders the following townships:

- Hale Township, Hardin County - north
- Bowling Green Township, Marion County - northeast
- Jackson Township - east
- York Township - south
- Bokes Creek Township, Logan County - west

No municipalities are located in Washington Township, although the unincorporated community of Byhalia is located in the township's south.

== Name and history ==
It is one of the forty-three Washington Townships statewide.

Washington Township was organized in 1836.

== Government ==
The township is governed by a three-member board of trustees, who are elected in November of odd-numbered years to a four-year term beginning on the following January 1. Two are elected in the year after the presidential election and one is elected in the year before it. There is also an elected township fiscal officer, who serves a four-year term beginning on April 1 of the year after the election, which is held in November of the year before the presidential election. Vacancies in the fiscal officership or on the board of trustees are filled by the remaining trustees.
