= List of F3, EF3, and IF3 tornadoes (2020–present) =

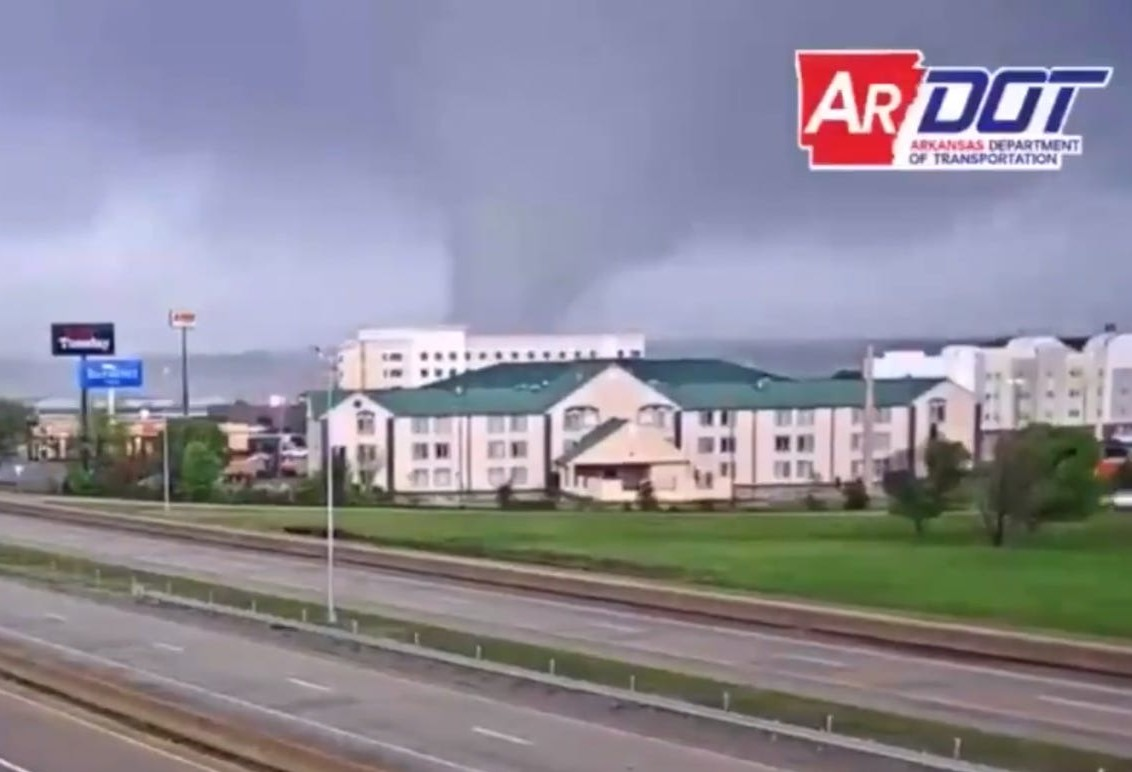
Traffic camera of the 2020 Jonesboro tornado shortly after touching down

This is a list of tornadoes which has been officially or unofficially labeled as F3, EF3, IF3 during the 2020s decade. These scales – the Fujita scale, the Enhanced Fujita scale, the International Fujita scale, and the TORRO tornado intensity scale – attempt to estimate the intensity of a tornado by classifying the damage caused to natural features and man-made structures in the tornado's path.

Tornadoes are among the most violent known meteorological phenomena. Each year, more than 2,000 tornadoes are recorded worldwide, with the vast majority occurring in North America and Europe. To assess the intensity of these events, meteorologist Ted Fujita devised a method to estimate maximum wind speeds within tornadic storms based on the damage caused; this became known as the Fujita scale. The scale ranks tornadoes from F0 to F5, with F0 being the least intense and F5 being the most intense. F3 tornadoes were estimated to have had maximum winds between 158 mph (254 km/h) and 206 mph (332 km/h) and are considered intense tornadoes. (Note: The winds estimated by the Fujita Scale are estimated values and have not been verified scientifically.)

Following two particularly devastating tornadoes in 1997 and 1999, engineers questioned the reliability of the Fujita scale. Ultimately, a new scale was devised that took into account 28 different damage indicators; this became known as the Enhanced Fujita scale. With building design and structural integrity taken more into account, winds in an EF3 tornado were estimated to between 136 and 166 mph (219 and 267 km/h). The Enhanced Fujita scale is used predominantly in North America. Most of Europe, on the other hand, uses the International Fujita scale, tornadoes rated IF3 are also included here. TORRO, an organisation based in Northern England, developed the TORRO scale, which ranks tornadoes between T0-11. T6 and T7 tornadoes roughly equate to IF3, their ratings are not as widely regarded due to its difference from the simplicity of the IF scale, and the fact that most people will look first to the ESSL for ratings.

== List ==
=== 2020 ===
In 2020, 22 EF3 tornadoes were recorded worldwide.

Articles	Highest Winds	Day	Fatalities	State / Province/ Country	Rated by	Damage caused by the tornado	Notes	Citation
2020 Mpumalanga Province tornado	136–165 mph (219–266 km/h)	January 3, 2020	0	South Africa	South African Weather Service		Destroyed seven family homes and 200 ha (490 acres)	
2020 Nashville tornado	165 mph (266 km/h)	March 3, 2020	5	Tennessee	NWS	2020-03-03 Nashville Tennessee EF3 tornado damage 3	Traveled 60.17 miles (96.83 km) and peak width of 1,600 yd (1,500 m). Sixth costliest tornado in U.S. history	
2020 Jonesboro tornado	148 mph (238 km/h)	March 28, 2020	0	Arkansas	NWS	EF3 damage at the Jonesboro International Airport	Traveled 12.55 miles (20.20 km) and peak width of 600 yd (550 m)	
2020 Monroe tornado	140 mph (230 km/h)	April 12, 2020	0	Louisiana	NWS	MonroeLA-2019-EF3	Traveled 8.01 miles (12.89 km) and peak width of 300 yd (270 m). First intense tornado of the outbreak.	
2020 North of Monroe tornado	140 mph (230 km/h)	April 12, 2020	0	Louisiana	NWS		Traveled 2.6 miles (4.2 km) and peak width of 400 yd (370 m)	
2020 Oak Ville–Stringer tornado	150 mph (240 km/h)	April 12, 2020	0	Mississippi	NWS	OakVale-Carson,MS-EF3damage	Traveled 84.1 miles (135.3 km) and peak width of 2,041 yd (1,866 m). Longest tracked tornado of the Easter outbreak.	
2020 Chattanooga tornado	145 mph (233 km/h)	April 12, 2020	2	Georgia, Tennessee	NWS		Traveled 18.37 miles (29.56 km) and peak width of 1,500 yd (1,400 m)	
2020 Thomaston tornado	140 mph (230 km/h)	April 13, 2020	0	Georgia	NWS		Traveled 16.63 miles (26.76 km) and peak width of 1,200 yd (1,100 m)	
2020 Forsyth tornado	140 mph (230 km/h)	April 13, 2020	0	Georgia	NWS		Traveled 5.3 miles (8.5 km) and peak width of 300 yd (270 m)	
2020 Seneca tornado	160 mph (260 km/h)	April 13, 2020	1	South Carolina	NWS		Traveled 16.71 miles (26.89 km) and peak width of 1,000 yd (910 m). Strongest tornado to strike Upstate South Carolina in 25 years.	
2020 Springfield, South Carolina tornado	140 mph (230 km/h)	April 13, 2020	0	South Carolina	NWS		Traveled 37.88 miles (60.96 km) and peak width of 800 yd (730 m)	
2020 Barnwell County tornado	138 mph (222 km/h)	April 13, 2020	0	South Carolina	NWS		Traveled 8.49 miles (13.66 km) and peak width of 50 yd (46 m)	
2020 Livingston tornado	140 mph (230 km/h)	April 13, 2020	2	South Carolina	NWS		Traveled 35.68 miles (57.42 km) and peak width of 770 yd (700 m)	
2020 Blackville tornado	140 mph (230 km/h)	April 13, 2020	0	South Carolina	NWS		Traveled 1.39 miles (2.24 km) and peak width of 40 yd (37 m)	
2020 Hilda tornado	145 mph (233 km/h)	April 13, 2020	0	South Carolina	NWS		Traveled 5.37 miles (8.64 km) and peak width of 800 yd (730 m)	
2020 Moncks Corner tornado	145 mph (233 km/h)	April 13, 2020	0	South Carolina	NWS		Traveled 5.74 miles (9.24 km) and peak width of 400 yd (370 m)	
2020 Onalaska tornado	140 mph (230 km/h)	April 22, 2020	3	Texas	NWS		Traveled 29.78 miles (47.93 km) and peak width of 1,100 yd (1,000 m)	
2020 Church Point tornado	150 mph (240 km/h)	May 17, 2020	1	Louisiana	NWS		Traveled 3.99 miles (6.42 km) and peak width of 100 yd (91 m)	
2020 Yachmenyukha tornado	158–206 mph (254–332 km/h)	June 7, 2020	0	Russia	GIS-PSNRU	A tornado scar from an F3 tornado northwest of Yachmenyukha, Russia	A likely "strong to violent" tornado caused significant tree damage, snapping 100% of birch trees in some areas.	
2020 Anhui Province tornado	136–165 mph (219–266 km/h)	July 22, 2020	0	China			Traveled 39 miles (63 km) and peak width of 100 yd (91 m)	
2020 Windsor tornado	145 mph (233 km/h)	August 4, 2020	2	North Carolina	NWS		Traveled 10 miles (16 km) and peak width of 600 yd (550 m). First intense tropical tornado since 2005. Spawned by Hurricane Isaias.	
2020 Scarth tornado	>165 mph (266 km/h)	August 7, 2020	2	Manitoba	Northern Tornadoes Project		Final EF3 tornado of the year. However, research in 2024 revealed that this tornado likely was much more violent in nature and had winds well into the EF5 range of near 400 km/h (250 mph).	

=== 2021 ===
In 2021, 26 EF3 tornadoes were recorded worldwide.

Articles	Highest Winds	Day	Fatalities	State / Province/ Country	Rated by	Damage caused by the tornado	Notes	Citation
2021 Fultondale tornado	150 mph (240 km/h)	January 25, 2021	1	Alabama	NWS		Traveled 10.4 miles (16.7 km) and peak width of 900 yd (820 m)	
2021 Sunset Beach tornado	160 mph (260 km/h)	February 15, 2021	3	North Carolina	NWS		Traveled 21.9 miles (35.2 km) and peak width of 275 yd (251 m)	
2021 Moundville tornado	140 mph (230 km/h)	March 25, 2021	0	Alabama	NWS		Traveled 11.7 miles (18.8 km) and peak width of 1,400 yd (1,300 m)	
2021 Eagle Point tornado	140 mph (230 km/h)	March 25, 2021	0	Alabama	NWS		Traveled 50.13 miles (80.68 km) and peak width of 1,140 yd (1,040 m)	
2021 Ohatchee–Piedmont tornado	140 mph (230 km/h)	March 25, 2021	6	Alabama	NWS		Traveled 38.17 miles (61.43 km) and peak width of 1,700 yd (1,600 m)	
2021 Centreville–Columbiana tornado	150 mph (240 km/h)	March 25, 2021	0	Alabama	NWS		Traveled 79.66 miles (128.20 km) and peak width of 2,300 yd (2,100 m). Seventh longest tracked tornado in Alabama.	
2021 Waxia tornado	140 mph (230 km/h)	April 10, 2021	1	Louisiana	NWS		Traveled 8.7 miles (14.0 km) and peak width of 200 yd (180 m).	
2021 Truscott tornado	138 mph (222 km/h)	April 27, 2021	0	Texas	NWS		Traveled 8 miles (13 km) and peak width of 300 yd (270 m).	
2021 Shengze tornado	136–165 mph (219–266 km/h)	May 14, 2021	4	China				
2021 Naperville–Woodridge tornado	140 mph (230 km/h)	June 20, 2021	1 (indirect)	Illinois	NWS		Traveled 14.8 miles (23.8 km) and peak width of 600 yd (550 m).	
2021 Jianguo tornado	136–165 mph (219–266 km/h)	June 25, 2021	6	China				
2021 Bernistap tornado	158–206 mph (254–332 km/h)	June 27, 2021	0	Belgium	European Severe Storms Laboratory		Traveled 3.73 miles (6.00 km) and peak width of 109 yd (100 m). F3 rating.	
2021 Lake City tornado	140 mph (230 km/h)	July 14, 2021	0	Iowa	NWS		Traveled 10.81 miles (17.40 km) and peak width of 505 yd (462 m).	
2021 Bensalem tornado	140 mph (230 km/h)	July 28, 2021	0	Pennsylvania	NWS		Traveled 3.50 miles (5.63 km) and peak width of 530 yd (480 m).	
2021 Andreapol tornado	144–216 mph (232–348 km/h)	August 2, 2021	3	Russia	European Severe Storms Laboratory		Traveled 4.66 miles (7.50 km) and peak width of 547 yd (500 m). IF3 rating.	
2021 Boscobel tornado	160 mph (260 km/h)	August 7, 2021	0	Wisconsin	NWS		Traveled 10.48 miles (16.87 km) and peak width of 1,100 yd (1,000 m).	
2021 Mullica Hill tornado	150 mph (240 km/h)	September 1, 2021	0	New Jersey	NWS		Traveled 12.82 miles (20.63 km) and peak width of 400 yd (370 m). Spawned by the remnants of Hurricane Ida.	
2021 Fredericktown tornado	150 mph (240 km/h)	October 24, 2021	0	Missouri	NWS		Traveled 18.95 miles (30.50 km) and peak width of 880 yd (800 m).	
2021 Coffman tornado	150 mph (240 km/h)	October 24, 2021	0	Missouri	NWS		Traveled 16.91 miles (27.21 km) and peak width of 400 yd (370 m).	
2021 Defiance–Harvester tornado	165 mph (266 km/h)	December 10, 2021	1	Missouri	NWS		Traveled 25 miles (40 km) and peak width of 150 yd (140 m).	
2021 Edwardsville tornado	150 mph (240 km/h)	December 10, 2021	6	Illinois	NWS		Traveled 4.28 miles (6.89 km) and peak width of 300 yd (270 m).	
2021 Dresden–Pembroke tornado	160 mph (260 km/h)	December 10–11, 2021	0	Tennessee, Kentucky	NWS		Traveled 122.91 miles (197.80 km) and peak width of 1,030 yd (940 m). Second longest-tracked tornado of the December 10–11 outbreak. Lasted 2 hours and 4 minutes, starting from December 10 to the 11th (10:32 CDT to 12:36 CDT)	
2021 Russellville tornado	140 mph (230 km/h)	December 11, 2021	0	Kentucky	NWS		Traveled 28.03 miles (45.11 km) and peak width of 1,400 yd (1,300 m).	
2021 Bowling Green tornadoes (1st tornado)	165 mph (266 km/h)	December 11, 2021	17 (16 direct, 1 indirect)	Kentucky	NWS		Traveled 29.87 miles (48.07 km) and peak width of 440 yd (400 m). Second deadliest tornado of the December 10–11 outbreak. One of the two tornadoes that impacted Bowling Green that night.	
2021 Saloma tornado	145 mph (233 km/h)	December 11, 2021	1	Kentucky	NWS		Traveled 14.70 miles (23.66 km) and peak width of 450 yd (410 m). Final intense tornado of the outbreak and year.	

=== 2022 ===
In 2022, 26 EF3 tornadoes were recorded worldwide.

Articles	Highest Winds	Day	Fatalities	State / Province/ Country	Rated by	Damage caused by the tornado	Notes	Citation
2022 Chariton tornado	138 mph (222 km/h)	March 5, 2022	1	Iowa	NWS		Traveled 11.28 miles (18.15 km) and peak width of 350 yd (320 m)	
2022 Jacksboro tornado	148 mph (238 km/h)	March 21, 2022	0	Texas	NWS		Traveled 34.51 miles (55.54 km) and peak width of 880 yd (800 m)	
2022 Kemper County tornado	145 mph (233 km/h)	March 22, 2022	0	Mississippi	NWS		Traveled 9.21 miles (14.82 km) and peak width of 800 yd (730 m)	
2022 Arabi tornado	160 mph (260 km/h)	March 22, 2022	2 (1 direct, 1 indirect)	Louisiana	NWS		Traveled 11.45 miles (18.43 km) and peak width of 320 yd (290 m). Strongest tornado to hit the New Orleans metropolitan area on record.	
2022 Springdale tornado	143 mph (230 km/h)	March 30, 2022	0	Arkansas	NWS		Traveled 5.2 miles (8.4 km) and peak width of 350 yd (320 m).	
2022 Centreville–Montevallo tornado	145 mph (233 km/h)	March 30, 2022	0	Alabama	NWS		Traveled 29.24 miles (47.06 km) and peak width of 1,200 yd (1,100 m).	
2022 Alford tornado	150 mph (240 km/h)	March 31, 2022	2	Florida	NWS		Traveled 12.14 miles (19.54 km) and peak width of 200 yd (180 m).	
2022 Bonaire tornado	160 mph (260 km/h)	April 5, 2022	0	Georgia	NWS		Traveled 3.89 miles (6.26 km) and peak width of 820 yd (750 m).	
2022 Allendale tornado	137 mph (220 km/h)	April 5, 2022	0	South Carolina	NWS		Traveled 13.28 miles (21.37 km) and peak width of 1,000 yd (910 m).	
2022 Ulmer tornado	160 mph (260 km/h)	April 5, 2022	0	South Carolina	NWS		Traveled 34.49 miles (55.51 km) and peak width of 500 yd (460 m).	
2022 Salado tornado	165 mph (266 km/h)	April 12, 2022	0	Texas	NWS		Traveled 16.66 miles (26.81 km) and peak width of 770 yd (700 m).	
2022 Andover tornado	155 mph (249 km/h)	April 29, 2022	0	Kansas	NWS		Traveled 12.89 miles (20.74 km) and peak width of 440 yd (400 m).	
2022 Lockett tornado	140 mph (230 km/h)	May 4, 2022	0	Texas	NWS		Traveled 22.92 miles (36.89 km) and peak width of 1,760 yd (1,610 m).	
2022 Gaylord tornado	150 mph (240 km/h)	May 20, 2022	2	Michigan	NWS		Traveled 16.60 miles (26.72 km) and peak width of 200 yd (180 m).	
2022 Altamont tornado	140 mph (230 km/h)	May 30, 2022	0	South Dakota	NWS		Traveled 13.31 miles (21.42 km) and peak width of 100 yd (91 m).	
2022 Lianyungang tornado	136–165 mph (219–266 km/h)	July 20, 2022	1	China	China Meteorological Administration		Brick homes and other buildings were damaged or destroyed. Several metal truss electrical transmission towers were toppled.	
2022 Shangqiu tornado	136–165 mph (219–266 km/h)	July 22, 2022	0	China	China Meteorological Administration		Numerous homes and large brick residential structures were damaged, some had their roofs torn off, and a few sustained collapse of their top floor exterior walls. Crops were damaged in fields, metal truss transmission towers were blown over.	
2022 Buryn tornado	158–206 mph (254–332 km/h)	September 18, 2022	1	Ukraine	European Severe Storms Laboratory		Traveled 9.7 miles (15.6 km) and peak width of 270 yd (250 m). F3 rating.	
2022 L'gov tornado	158–206 mph (254–332 km/h)	September 18, 2022	0	Russia	GIS-PSNRU		Over 200 houses were damaged, some of which were completely destroyed. Classified as F3 by PSNRU or as IF2.5 by the ESSL.	
2022 Nikol'sk tornado	158–206 mph (254–332 km/h)	September 19, 2022	0	Russia	GIS-PSNRU		Classified as a single F3 tornado by PSNRU or as two separate IF2 tornadoes by the ESSL.	
2022 Bihucourt tornado	136–165 mph (219–266 km/h)	October 23, 2022	0	France	Keraunos, European Severe Storms Laboratory		Traveled 128 miles (206 km) and peak width of 437 yd (400 m). Longest tracked tornado on record in France.	
2022 Cason–Naples tornado	155 mph (249 km/h)	November 4, 2022	1	Texas	NWS		Traveled 16.95 miles (27.28 km) and peak width of 650 yd (590 m).	
2022 New Boston tornado	140 mph (230 km/h)	November 4, 2022	0	Texas	NWS		Traveled 15.68 miles (25.23 km) and peak width of 800 yd (730 m).	
2022 Clarks tornado	140 mph (230 km/h)	November 29, 2022	0	Louisiana	NWS		Traveled 7.9 miles (12.7 km) and peak width of 300 yd (270 m).	
2022 Fruitdale tornado	140 mph (230 km/h)	November 30, 2022	0	Mississippi,Alabama	NWS		Traveled 20.26 miles (32.61 km) and peak width of 700 yd (640 m).	
2022 Farmerville tornado	140 mph (230 km/h)	December 13, 2022	0	Louisiana	NWS		Traveled 9.06 miles (14.58 km) and peak width of 500 yd (460 m). Final EF3 tornado of 2022.	

=== 2023 ===
In 2023, 34 EF3 tornadoes were recorded worldwide.

Articles	Highest Winds	Day	Fatalities	State / Province/ Country	Rated by	Damage caused by the tornado	Notes	Citation
2023 Old Kingston–Lake Martin tornado	150 mph (240 km/h)	January 12, 2023	7	Alabama	NWS		Traveled 82.31 miles (132.47 km) and peak width of 1,500 yd (1,400 m). Sixth longest tracked tornado in Alabama.	
2023 Griffin–Locust Grove tornado	155 mph (249 km/h)	January 12, 2023	0	Georgia	NWS		Traveled 32.80 miles (52.79 km) and peak width of 2,200 yd (2,000 m).	
2023 Pasadena–Deer Park tornado	140 mph (230 km/h)	January 24, 2023	0	Texas	NWS		Traveled 23.30 miles (37.50 km) and peak width of 1,000 yd (910 m). First tornado emergency issued by NWS Houston.	
2023 Black Hawk–Winona tornado	165 mph (266 km/h)	March 24, 2023	3	Mississippi	NWS		Traveled 29.43 miles (47.36 km) and peak width of 1,250 yd (1,140 m).	
2023 Amory tornado	155–158 mph (249–254 km/h)	March 24, 2023	2	Mississippi	NWS		Traveled 36.90 miles (59.38 km) and peak width of 1,600 yd (1,500 m).	
2023 West Point tornado	150 mph (240 km/h)	March 26, 2023	0	Georgia	NWS		Traveled 21.70 miles (34.92 km) and peak width of 500 yd (460 m).	
2023 Little Rock tornado	165 mph (266 km/h)	March 31, 2023	1 (indirect)	Arkansas	NWS		Traveled 34.44 miles (55.43 km) and peak width of 600 yd (550 m). First intense tornado of the March 31 outbreak.	
2023 Ottumwa–Martinsburg tornado	150 mph (240 km/h)	March 31, 2023	0	Iowa	NWS		Traveled 25.41 miles (40.89 km) and peak width of 1,000 yd (910 m).	
2023 Wynne–Parkin tornado	150 mph (240 km/h)	March 31, 2023	4	Arkansas, Tennessee	NWS		Traveled 73 miles (117 km) and peak width of 1,600 yd (1,500 m). Costliest tornado of the March 31 outbreak. Second longest-tracked tornado of the outbreak.	
2023 Covington tornado	150 mph (240 km/h)	March 31, 2023	4	Tennessee	NWS		Traveled 39.53 miles (63.62 km) and peak width of 2,000 yd (1,800 m).	
2023 Robinson–Sullivan tornado	165 mph (266 km/h)	March 31, 2023	6	Illinois, Indiana	NWS		Traveled 40.86 miles (65.76 km) and peak width of 1,180 yd (1,080 m).	
2023 Stinesville tornado	138–153 mph (222–246 km/h)	March 31, 2023	2	Indiana	NWS		Traveled 5.92 miles (9.53 km) and peak width of 400 yd (370 m). Some damage indicators are 152-153 mph despite the official rating being 138 mph	
2023 Whiteland tornado	140 mph (230 km/h)	March 31, 2023	0	Indiana	NWS		Traveled 5.48 miles (8.82 km) and peak width of 316 yd (289 m).	
2023 Gas City tornado	140 mph (230 km/h)	March 31, 2023	0	Indiana	NWS		Traveled 6.35 miles (10.22 km) and peak width of 200 yd (180 m).	
2023 Bethel Springs–Adamsville tornado	155 mph (249 km/h)	March 31, 2023	9	Tennessee	NWS		Traveled 85.89 miles (138.23 km) and peak width of 1,400 yd (1,300 m). Deadliest tornado of the outbreak. Longest tracked tornado of the outbreak.	
2023 Hazel Green–Elora tornado	160 mph (260 km/h)	April 1, 2023	1	Alabama, Tennessee	NWS		Traveled 12.10 miles (19.47 km) and peak width of 215 yd (197 m).	
2023 Bridgeville–Ellendale tornado	140 mph (230 km/h)	April 1, 2023	1	Delaware	NWS		Traveled 14.30 miles (23.01 km) and peak width of 700 yd (640 m). Largest tornado ever recorded in Delaware. First Delaware tornado since 1983 to cause a fatality.	
2023 Lewistown–Canton tornado	160 mph (260 km/h)	April 4, 2023	0	Illinois	NWS		Traveled 19.92 miles (32.06 km) and peak width of 600 yd (550 m).	
2023 Cole tornado	160 mph (260 km/h)	April 19, 2023	1 indirect	Oklahoma	NWS		Traveled 10.92 miles (17.57 km) and peak width of 1,200 yd (1,100 m).	
2023 Pink tornado	141 mph (227 km/h)	April 19, 2023	0	Oklahoma	NWS		Traveled 0.61 miles (0.98 km) and peak width of 250 yd (230 m).	
2023 Virginia Beach tornado	145 mph (233 km/h)	April 30, 2023	0	Virginia	NWS		Traveled 4.5 miles (7.2 km) and peak width of 350 yd (320 m).	
2023 Perryton tornado	140 mph (230 km/h)	June 15, 2023	3	Texas	NWS		Traveled 6.31 miles (10.15 km) and peak width of 880 yd (800 m).	
2023 Bay Springs–Louin tornado	150 mph (240 km/h)	June 18, 2023	1	Mississippi	NWS		Traveled 7.65 miles (12.31 km) and peak width of 1,350 yd (1,230 m).	
2023 Matador tornado	165 mph (266 km/h)	June 21, 2021	4	Texas	NWS		Traveled 9.14 miles (14.71 km) and peak width of 600 yd (550 m).	
2023 Granada tornado	155 mph (249 km/h)	June 23, 2023	0	Colorado	NWS		Traveled 13.12 miles (21.11 km) and peak width of 320 yd (290 m). Strongest tornado in Colorado since 2015.	
2023 Dortches–Battleboro tornado	150 mph (240 km/h)	July 19, 2023	0	North Carolina	NWS		Traveled 16.50 miles (26.55 km) and peak width of 600 yd (550 m). Destroyed a Pfizer facility.	
2023 Alfonsine tornado	158–206 mph (254–332 km/h)	July 22, 2023	0	Italy	European Severe Storms Laboratory		Traveled 8.70 miles (14.00 km) and peak width of 1,640 yd (1,500 m). IF3 rating.	
2023 Constableville–Turin tornado	140 mph (230 km/h)	August 7, 2023	0	New York	NWS		Traveled 16 miles (26 km) and peak width of 700 yd (640 m).	
2023 Yuma tornado	150 mph (240 km/h)	August 8, 2023	0	Colorado	NWS		Traveled 15.65 miles (25.19 km) and peak width of 212 yd (194 m).	
2023 Funing, Jiangsu tornado	136–165 mph (219–266 km/h)	September 19, 2023	5	China	China Meteorological Administration			
2023 Suqian, Jiangsu tornado	136–165 mph (219–266 km/h)	September 19, 2023	5	China	China Meteorological Administration			
2023 Jersey tornado	144–216 mph (232–348 km/h)	November 1, 2023	0	Jersey	European Severe Storms Laboratory		Traveled 4.97 miles (8.00 km) and peak width of 601 yd (550 m). Strongest tornado to hit the British Isles since 2005. IF3 rating	
2023 Lavino tornado	144–216 mph (232–348 km/h)	November 4, 2023	0	Bulgaria	European Severe Storms Laboratory		Traveled 9.32 miles (15.00 km) and peak width of 273 yd (250 m).	
2023 Clarksville tornado	150 mph (240 km/h)	December 9, 2023	4	Tennessee, Kentucky	NWS		Traveled 47.75 miles (76.85 km) and peak width of 500 yd (460 m). Final EF3 tornado of 2023	

=== 2024 ===
In 2024, 45 EF3 tornadoes were recorded worldwide.

Articles	Highest Winds	Day	Fatalities	State / Province/ Country	Rated by	Damage caused by the tornado	Notes	Citation
2024 Lower Grand Lagoon tornado	140 mph (230 km/h)	January 9, 2024	0	Florida	NWS		Traveled 5.2 miles (8.4 km) and peak width of 550 yd (500 m).	
2024 Lakeview–Russells Point tornado	155 mph (249 km/h)	March 14, 2024	3	Ohio	NWS		Traveled 31.33 miles (50.42 km) and peak width of 1,000 yd (910 m).	
2024 Winchester–Bradford tornado	165 mph (266 km/h)	March 14, 2024	1	Indiana, Ohio	NWS		Traveled 41.40 miles (66.63 km) and peak width of 700 yd (640 m).	
2024 Farwell–Elba tornado	145 mph (233 km/h)	April 26, 2024	0	Nebraska	NWS		Traveled 9.31 miles (14.98 km) and peak width of 600 yd (550 m).	
2024 Lincoln–Waverly tornado	158 mph (254 km/h)	April 26, 2024	0	Nebraska	NWS		Traveled 5.25 miles (8.45 km) and peak width of 700 yd (640 m). Collapsed a manufacturing plant, trapping 70 people.	
2024 Omaha–Crescent tornado	152 mph (245 km/h)	April 26, 2024	0	Nebraska, Iowa	NWS		Traveled 19.06 miles (30.67 km) and peak width of 550 yd (500 m).	
2024 Treynor–McClelland tornado	145 mph (233 km/h)	April 26, 2024	0	Iowa	NWS		Traveled 13.31 miles (21.42 km) and peak width of 900 yd (820 m).	
2024 Minden–Harlan tornado	160 mph (260 km/h)	April 26, 2024	1	Iowa	NWS		Traveled 40.91 miles (65.84 km) and peak width of 1,900 yd (1,700 m). The only deadly tornado of the April 26 outbreak. Longest tracked tornado of the April 26 outbreak.	
2024 Sulphur tornado	165 mph (266 km/h)	April 27, 2024	1	Oklahoma	NWS		Traveled 9.91 miles (15.95 km) and peak width of 440 yd (400 m).	
2024 Spaulding–Holdenville tornado	150 mph (240 km/h)	April 27, 2024	2	Oklahoma	NWS		Traveled 27.98 miles (45.03 km) and peak width of 1,760 yd (1,610 m). Deadliest tornado of the entire April 25–28 outbreak.	
2024 Westmoreland, Kansas tornado	140 mph (230 km/h)	April 30, 2024	1	Kansas	NWS		Traveled 2.24 miles (3.60 km) and peak width of 100 yd (91 m).	
2024 Hawley, Texas tornado	165 mph (266 km/h)	May 2, 2024	0	Texas	NWS		Traveled 3.29 miles (5.29 km) and peak width of 210 yd (190 m). Powerful drill-bit tornado that was the strongest of the April 30-May 4 outbreak sequence.	
2024 Robert Lee, Texas tornado	140 mph (230 km/h)	May 3, 2024	0	Texas	NWS		Traveled 3.53 miles (5.68 km) and peak width of 350 yd (320 m). Tornado was originally rated high-end EF1 before getting upgraded in late August due to new damage findings.	
2024 Columbia–Lunns Store tornado	140 mph (230 km/h)	May 8, 2024	1	Tennessee	NWS		Traveled 12.94 miles (20.82 km) and peak width of 900 yd (820 m).	
2024 Brigadoon tornado	136 mph (219 km/h)	May 8, 2024	0	Alabama	NWS		Traveled 3.76 miles (6.05 km) and peak width of 228 yd (208 m).	
2024 Pisgah–Henagar tornado	140 mph (230 km/h)	May 8, 2024	0	Alabama	NWS		Traveled 12.34 miles (19.86 km) and peak width of 880 yd (800 m).	
2024 Vilisca–Carbon tornado	155 mph (249 km/h)	May 21, 2024	0	Iowa	NWS		Traveled 34.64 miles (55.75 km) and peak width of 1,300 yd (1,200 m).	
2024 Sterling City, Texas tornado	140 mph (230 km/h)	May 22, 2024	0	Texas	NWS		Traveled 4.79 miles (7.71 km) and peak width of 400 yd (370 m).	
2024 Valley View tornado	140 mph (230 km/h)	May 25, 2024	7	Texas	NWS		Traveled 47.27 miles (76.07 km) and peak width of 1,200 yd (1,100 m). Deadliest tornado of the year in the United States. Deadliest tornado of the Late May tornado outbreak sequence.	
2024 Claremore–Pryor Creek tornado	150 mph (240 km/h)	May 25, 2024	2	Oklahoma	NWS		Traveled 23.90 miles (38.46 km) and peak width of 2,000 yd (1,800 m).	
2024 Celina, Texas tornado	165 mph (266 km/h)	May 25, 2024	0	Texas	NWS		Traveled 0.71 miles (1.14 km) and peak width of 175 yd (160 m).	
2024 Cherokee City–Decatur tornado	150 mph (240 km/h)	May 26, 2024	0	Oklahoma, Arkansas	NWS		Traveled 7.9 miles (12.7 km) and peak width of 3,200 yd (2,900 m). Largest tornado ever recorded in Arkansas.	
2024 Olvey–Pyatt tornado	145 mph (233 km/h)	May 26, 2024	4	Arkansas	NWS		Traveled 21.60 miles (34.76 km) and peak width of 2,000 yd (1,800 m).	
2024 Briarcliff–Elizabeth tornado	140 mph (230 km/h)	May 26, 2024	1	Arkansas	NWS		Traveled 36.28 miles (58.39 km) and peak width of 1,760 yd (1,610 m).	
2024 Morehouse–Sikeston tornado	140 mph (230 km/h)	May 26, 2024	2 indirect	Missouri	NWS		Traveled 19.57 miles (31.49 km) and peak width of 300 yd (270 m).	
2024 Mountain View tornado	138 mph (222 km/h)	May 26, 2024	0	Missouri	NWS		Traveled 19.57 miles (31.49 km) and peak width of 300 yd (270 m).	
2024 Goreville–Eagle Point Bay tornado	150 mph (240 km/h)	May 26, 2024	0	Illinois	NWS		Traveled 4.87 miles (7.84 km) and peak width of 300 yd (270 m).	
2024 Charleston–Barnsley tornado	160 mph (260 km/h)	May 26, 2024	2 (1 direct, 1 indirect)	Kentucky	NWS		Traveled 34.14 miles (54.94 km) and peak width of 700 yd (640 m). This tornado had four tornado emergencies issued for it. Impacted the same regions that got devastated by the Western Kentucky tornado 3 years prior.	
2024 Midkiff, Texas tornado	140 mph (230 km/h)	May 30, 2024	0	Texas	NWS		Traveled 5.44 miles (8.75 km) and peak width of 250 yd (230 m).	
2024 Sanderson tornado	140 mph (230 km/h)	June 2, 2024	0	Texas	NWS		Traveled 0.91 miles (1.46 km) and peak width of 250 yd (230 m).	
2024 oThongathi tornado	136–165 mph (219–266 km/h)	June 3, 2024	12	South Africa	South African Weather Service		First intense South Africa tornado since 2020. Deadliest single tornado worldwide in 2024.	
2024 Whitman, Nebraska tornado	160 mph (260 km/h)	June 25, 2024	0	Nebraska	NWS		Traveled 39.62 miles (63.76 km) and peak width of 500 yd (460 m).	
2024 Mount Vernon tornado	140 mph (230 km/h)	July 9, 2024	0	Indiana	NWS		Traveled 5.84 miles (9.40 km) and peak width of 300 yd (270 m). First intense tropical tornado since 2021. First out of the six EF3+ tropical tornadoes of 2024. Spawned by the remnants of Hurricane Beryl.	
2024 Lucama, North Carolina tornado	140 mph (230 km/h)	August 8, 2024	1	North Carolina	NWS		Traveled 6.49 miles (10.44 km) and peak width of 200 yd (180 m). Second out of the six EF3+ tropical tornadoes of 2024. Spawned by Hurricane Debby	
2024 Rocky Mount tornado	140 mph (230 km/h)	September 27, 2024	0	North Carolina	NWS		Traveled 0.25 miles (0.40 km) and peak width of 100 yd (91 m). Third out of the six EF3+ tropical tornadoes of 2024. Spawned by Hurricane Helene.	
2024 Berezino tornado	144–216 mph (232–348 km/h)	September 28, 2024	1	Russia	ESSL, GIS-PSNRU	A tornado scar from an IF3 tornado that struck Berezino village, Moscow Oblast, Russia.	Nearly 70 houses were damaged, some of which were completely destroyed. Traveled 8.39 miles (13.50 km) and peak width of 514 yd (470 m).	
2024 Sarasota Colony tornado	140 mph (230 km/h)	October 9, 2024	0	Florida	NWS		Traveled 15.46 miles (24.88 km) and peak width of 250 yd (230 m). Fourth out of the six EF3+ tropical tornadoes of 2024. First intense tropical tornado in Florida since 1972, and third on record for Florida since records began in 1950. Spawned by Hurricane Milton.	
2024 Wellington–The Acerage tornado	140 mph (230 km/h)	October 9, 2024	0	Florida	NWS		Traveled 28.95 miles (46.59 km) and peak width of 457 yd (418 m). Fifth out of the six EF3+ tropical tornadoes of 2024. Spawned by Hurricane Milton.	
2024 Fort Pierce–Vero Beach tornado	155 mph (249 km/h)	October 9, 2024	6	Florida	NWS		Traveled 21.17 miles (34.07 km) and peak width of 500 yd (460 m). Sixth and last EF3+ tropical tornadoes of 2024. Tied for the deadliest single tropical tornado on record. Spawned by Hurricane Milton.	
2024 Valley Brook tornado	152 mph (245 km/h)	November 3, 2024	0	Oklahoma	NWS		Traveled 2.4 miles (3.9 km) and peak width of 400 yd (370 m).	
2024 Comanche–Harrisburg tornado	147 mph (237 km/h)	November 3, 2024	0	Oklahoma	NWS		Traveled 22 miles (35 km) and peak width of 500 yd (460 m).	
2024 Harrah–Warwick tornado	145 mph (233 km/h)	November 3, 2024	0	Oklahoma	NWS		Traveled 25.10 miles (40.39 km) and peak width of 1,000 yd (910 m).	
2024 Porter Heights–Splendora tornado	145 mph (233 km/h)	December 28, 2024	0	Texas	NWS		Traveled 10.34 miles (16.64 km) and peak width of 1,760 yd (1,610 m).	
2024 Oak Island–Port Arthur tornado	161 mph (259 km/h)	December 28, 2024	0	Texas, Louisiana	NWS		Traveled 68.42 miles (110.11 km) and peak width of 880 yd (800 m). Longest tracked tornado of the year.	
2024 Bude–Brookhaven tornado	140 mph (230 km/h)	December 28, 2024	0	Mississippi	NWS		Traveled 28.29 miles (45.53 km) and peak width of 1,500 yd (1,400 m). Final EF3 tornado of 2024.	

=== 2025 ===
In 2025, 38 EF3 tornadoes were confirmed worldwide.

Articles	Highest Winds	Day	Fatalities	State / Province/ Country	Rated by	Damage caused by the tornado	Notes	Citation
2025 Pleasant Grove–Matherville tornado	150 mph (240 km/h)	February 12, 2025	0	Mississippi	NWS		This tornado traveled 26.14 miles (42.07 km) with a peak width of 910 yd (830 m). It was the first EF3 tornado of 2025.	
2025 Gamaliel–Bakersfield tornado	145 mph (233 km/h)	March 14, 2025	3	Arkansas, Missouri	NWS		This tornado traveled 35.74 miles (57.52 km) with a peak width of 1,200 yd (1,100 m).	
2025 Fremont–Van Buren tornado	165 mph (266 km/h)	March 14, 2025	0	Missouri	NWS		This tornado traveled 58.02 miles (93.37 km) with a peak width of 1,200 yd (1,100 m). Prompted the first tornado emergency of 2025.	
2025 Koshkonong–Greer tornado	145 mph (233 km/h)	March 14, 2025	0	Missouri	NWS		This tornado traveled 23.54 miles (37.88 km) with a peak width of 800 yd (730 m).	
2025 Cushman–Cave City tornado	165 mph (266 km/h)	March 14, 2025	3	Arkansas	NWS		This tornado traveled 81.83 miles (131.69 km) with a peak width of 700 yd (640 m).	
2025 Gads Hill–Des Arc tornado	155 mph (249 km/h)	March 14, 2025	3	Missouri	NWS		This tornado traveled 29.92 miles (48.15 km) with a peak width of 1,525 yd (1,394 m).	
2025 Eastwood–Leeper tornado	165 mph (266 km/h)	March 14, 2025	2	Missouri	NWS		This tornado traveled 31.32 miles (50.40 km) with a peak width of 325 yd (297 m).	
2025 Burbank–Hurricane tornado	140 mph (230 km/h)	March 14, 2025	1	Missouri	NWS		This tornado traveled 28.75 miles (46.27 km) with a peak width of 500 yd (460 m).	
2025 Poplar Bluff tornado	145 mph (233 km/h)	March 14, 2025	1	Missouri	NWS		This tornado traveled 18.65 miles (30.01 km) with a peak width of 350 yd (320 m).	
2025 Tylertown tornado	140 mph (230 km/h)	March 15, 2025	1	Mississippi	NWS		This tornado traveled 25.81 miles (41.54 km) with a peak width of 880 yd (800 m).	
2025 Plantersville–Clanton tornado	140 mph (230 km/h)	March 15, 2025	2	Alabama	NWS		This tornado traveled 24.33 miles (39.16 km) with a peak width of 1,000 yd (910 m).	
2025 Tohopeka–Daviston tornado	140 mph (230 km/h)	March 15, 2025	0	Alabama	NWS		This tornado traveled 20.45 miles (32.91 km) with a peak width of 800 yd (730 m).	
2025 Berryman–Old Mines tornado	165 mph (266 km/h)	April 2, 2025	0	Missouri	NWS		This tornado traveled 21.95 miles (35.33 km) with a peak width of 200 yd (180 m).	
2025 Bay–Lake City tornado	160 mph (260 km/h)	April 2, 2025	0	Arkansas	NWS		This tornado traveled 24.79 miles (39.90 km) with a peak width of 1,500 yd (1,400 m).	
2025 Jeffersontown–Boston tornado	145 mph (233 km/h)	April 3, 2025	0	Kentucky	NWS		This tornado traveled 9.68 miles (15.58 km) with a peak width of 350 yd (320 m).	
2025 Senatobia–Coldwater tornado	165 mph (266 km/h)	April 3, 2025	0	Mississippi	NWS		This tornado traveled 12.22 miles (19.67 km) with a peak width of 650 yd (590 m).	
2025 Selmer–Oak Grove tornado	160 mph (260 km/h)	April 3, 2025	5	Tennessee	NWS		This tornado traveled 29.33 miles (47.20 km) with a peak width of 650 yd (590 m).	
2025 Slayden–Hornsby tornado	160 mph (260 km/h)	April 3, 2025	2	Mississippi, Tennessee	NWS		This tornado traveled 39.93 miles (64.26 km) with a peak width of 1,200 yd (1,100 m).	
2025 Bennington–Fort Calhoun tornado	140 mph (230 km/h)	April 17, 2025	0	Nebraska	NWS		This tornado traveled 8.26 miles (13.29 km) with a peak width of 170 yd (160 m).	
2025 Seymour tornado	140 mph (230 km/h)	April 29, 2025	0	Texas	NWS		This tornado traveled 3.7 miles (6.0 km) with a peak width of 650 yd (590 m).	
2025 St. Louis tornado	152 mph (245 km/h)	May 16, 2025	5 (4 direct, 1 indirect)	Missouri	NWS		This tornado traveled 23.30 miles (37.50 km) with a peak width of 1,750 yd (1,600 m). First deadly tornado to impact St. Louis since 1959. Federal Emergency Management Agency officials said the residential destruction was the largest they had surveyed since the tornado that hit Joplin, Missouri in 2011.	
2025 Shawan–Blodgett tornado	152 mph (245 km/h)	May 16, 2025	2	Missouri	NWS		This tornado traveled 16.35 miles (26.31 km) with a peak width of 200 yd (180 m).	
2025 Morganfield tornado	155 mph (249 km/h)	May 16, 2025	0	Kentucky	NWS		This tornado traveled 9.94 miles (16.00 km) with a peak width of 500 yd (460 m).	
2025 Arnett tornado	145 mph (233 km/h)	May 18, 2025	0	Oklahoma	NWS		This tornado traveled 5.5 miles (8.9 km) with a peak width of 50 yd (46 m).	
2025 Grinnell tornado	140 mph (230 km/h)	May 18, 2025	0	Kansas	NWS		This tornado traveled 13.33 miles (21.45 km) with a peak width of 416 yd (380 m).	
2025 Stratton–Hamlet tornado	140 mph (230 km/h)	May 18, 2025	0	Nebraska	NWS		This tornado traveled 11.11 miles (17.88 km) with a peak width of 250 yd (230 m).	
2025 Grainfield–Hoxie tornado	143 mph (230 km/h)	May 18, 2025	0	Kansas	NWS		This tornado traveled 4.50 miles (7.24 km) with a peak width of 230 yd (210 m).	
2025 Coldwater tornado	155 mph (249 km/h)	May 18, 2025	0	Kansas	NWS		This tornado traveled 8.48 miles (13.65 km) with a peak width of 800 yd (730 m).	
2025 Greensburg–Brenham tornado	140 mph (230 km/h)	May 18, 2025	0	Kansas	NWS		This tornado traveled 10.95 miles (17.62 km) with a peak width of 900 yd (820 m).	
2025 Haviland tornado	155 mph (249 km/h)	May 18, 2025	0	Kansas	NWS		This tornado traveled 16.76 miles (26.97 km) with a peak width of 1,700 yd (1,600 m).	
2025 Iuka tornado	160 mph (260 km/h)	May 18, 2025	0	Kansas	NWS		This tornado traveled 11.78 miles (18.96 km) with a peak width of 1,500 yd (1,400 m).	
2025 Preston–Plevna tornado	155 mph (249 km/h)	May 18, 2025	0	Kansas	NWS		This tornado traveled 21.49 miles (34.58 km) with a peak width of 1,760 yd (1,610 m).	
2025 Pittsburg–Hartshorne tornado	140 mph (230 km/h)	May 19, 2025	0	Oklahoma	NWS		This tornado traveled 16 miles (26 km) with a peak width of 2,972 yd (2,718 m).	
2025 Taylakovo tornado	158–206 mph (254–332 km/h)	June 17, 2025	0	Russia	GIS-PSNRU		Strongest European tornado in 2025. Its peak width was found to be over 2.5 km (1.6 mi) wide, tying it for the second-widest tornado ever recorded in Russia.	
2025 Spiritwood tornado	155 mph (249 km/h)	June 20, 2025	0	North Dakota	NWS		This tornado traveled 7.65 miles (12.31 km) with a peak width of 800 yd (730 m).	
2025 Clear Lake–Gary tornado	165 mph (266 km/h)	June 28, 2025	0	South Dakota	NWS		This tornado traveled 9.74 miles (15.68 km) with a peak width of 100 yd (91 m).	
2025 Makinohara–Yoshida tornado	170 mph (270 km/h)	September 5, 2025	1	Japan	Japan Meteorological Agency		One of the strongest tornadoes to hit Japan on record.	
2025 Daet tornado	137 mph (220 km/h)	September 14, 2025	2	Philippines	Severe Weather Archive of the Philippines		This tornado traveled 1.24 miles (2 km) being one of the strongest tornadoes to hit the Philippines on record.	

=== 2026 ===
As of November 2026, 28 EF3/IF3 tornadoes have been confirmed worldwide.

Articles	Highest Winds	Day	Fatalities	State / Province/ Country	Rated by	Damage caused by the tornado	Notes	Citation
2026 Union City Tornado	160 mph (260 km/h)	March 6, 2026	3	Michigan	NWS		This tornado traveled 4.46 miles (7.18 km) with a peak width of 500 yd (460 m).	
2026 Beggs tornado	137 mph (220 km/h)	March 6, 2026	2	Oklahoma	NWS		This tornado traveled 6.80 miles (10.94 km) with a peak width of 950 yd (870 m).	
2026 Kankakee–Roselawn tornado	160 mph (260 km/h)	March 10, 2026	3	Illinois, Indiana	NWS		This tornado traveled 35.62 miles (57.32 km) with a peak width of 1,550 yd (1,420 m).	
2026 Union Center tornado	140 mph (230 km/h)	April 14, 2026	0	Wisconsin	NWS		This tornado traveled 7.03 miles (11.31 km) with a peak width of 125 yd (114 m).	
2026 Cream–Montana tornado	140 mph (230 km/h)	April 17, 2026	0	Wisconsin	NWS		This tornado traveled 10.35 miles (16.66 km) with a peak width of 300 yd (270 m).	
2026 Ringle tornado	145 mph (233 km/h)	April 17, 2026	0	Wisconsin	NWS		This tornado traveled 13.52 miles (21.76 km) with a peak width of 600 yd (550 m).	
2026 Mineral Wells tornado	145 mph (233 km/h)	April 28, 2026	0	Texas	NWS		This tornado traveled 4.69 miles (7.55 km) with a peak width of 800 yd (730 m).	
2026 Las Flores Tornado	232–348 km/h (144–216 mph)	May 6, 2026	0	Argentina	SAMHI		This tornado traveled 20 km (12 mi).	
2026 Garden City–Monticello tornado	160 mph (260 km/h)	May 6, 2026	0	Mississippi	NWS		This tornado traveled 81.9 miles (131.8 km) with a peak width of 2,050 yd (1,870 m).	
2026 St. Libory tornado	160 mph (260 km/h)	May 17, 2026	0	Nebraska	NWS		This tornado traveled 6.09 miles (9.80 km) with a peak width of 350 yd (320 m).	
2026 Oxbow tornado	225–265 km/h (140–165 mph)	June 9, 2026	0	Saskatchewan	NTP		This tornado traveled 32 kilometres (20 miles) with a peak width of 560 metres (610 yd)	
2026 Washburn tornado	155 mph (249 km/h)	June 11, 2026	0	Illinois	NWS		This tornado traveled 11.23 miles (18.07 km) with a peak width of 930 yd (850 m).	
2026 Streator tornado	145 mph (233 km/h)	June 11, 2026	0	Illinois	NWS		This tornado traveled 11.91 miles (19.17 km) with a peak width of 600 yd (550 m).	
2026 Kouts tornado	165 mph (266 km/h)	June 11, 2026	0	Indiana	NWS		This tornado traveled 22.47 miles (36.16 km) with a peak width of 450 yd (410 m).	
2026 Effingham Tornado	150 mph (240 km/h)	June 17, 2026	0	Illinois	NWS		This tornado traveled 26.18 miles (42.13 km) with a peak width of 500 yd (460 m).	
2026 Gosport–Hindustan tornado	140 mph (230 km/h)	June 17, 2026	0	Indiana	NWS		This tornado traveled 18.49 miles (29.76 km) with a peak width of 880 yd (800 m).	
2026 Dix Tornado	140 mph (230 km/h)	June 21, 2026	2	Illinois	NWS		This tornado traveled 13.81 miles (22.23 km) with a peak width of 400 yd (370 m).	
2026 Kushva Tornado	290 km/h (180 mph)	June 22, 2026	0	Russia	ESSL, PSU, IPT		This tornado traveled 30.5 kilometres (19.0 miles) with a peak width of 875 metres (957 yd).	
2026 Rossburn tornado	225–265 km/h (140–165 mph)	June 28, 2026	0	Manitoba	NTP		This tornado had a peak width of 660 metres (720 yd).	
2026 Xianning–Ezhou tornado	247 km/h (153 mph)	July 6, 2026	2	China	CMA		Associated with Tropical Storm Maysak.	
2026 Ezhou–Huanggang tornado	247 km/h (153 mph)	July 6, 2026	11	China	CMA		Associated with Tropical Storm Maysak.	
2026 Anhui tornado	223 km/h (139 mph)	July 7, 2026	0	China	Chang'an University		Associated with Tropical Storm Maysak.	
2026 Tulliby Lake tornado	230 km/h (140 mph)	July 11, 2026	0	Alberta	NTP		This tornado traveled 17.5 kilometres (10.9 miles) with a peak width of 450 metres (490 yd).	
2026 Appleton–Menasha tornado	145 mph (233 km/h)	July 27, 2026	0	Wisconsin	NWS		This tornado traveled 12.07 miles (19.42 km) with a peak width of 1,500 yards (1,400 m).	
2026 Pedro Osório tornado	270 km/h (170 mph)	August 6, 2026	0	Brazil	PREVOTS		This tornado travelled 34 kilometres (21 mi) with a peak width of 600 metres (660 yd).	
2026 Pomas Tornado		August 24, 2026	0	France	Keraunos, ESWD			
2026 Marsala tornado		October 9, 2026	1	Italy	ESWD			
2026 Kepez Antalya tornado	290 km/h (180 mph)	October 26, 2026	4	Turkey	ESWD			
2026 Amuda tornado		November 6, 2026	0	Syria, Turkey	ESWD			

== Deaths ==
F3/EF3/IF3 tornadoes from 2020 to present that caused five or more fatalities.

Name	Year	Number of deaths
Bowling Green	2021	16
oThongathi	2024	12
Ezhou	2026	11
Bethel Springs	2023	9
Old Kingston	2023	7
Valley View	2024	7
Ohatchee	2021	6
Jianguo	2021	6
Edwardsville	2021	6
Robinson	2023	6
Fort Pierce	2024	6
Nashville	2020	5
Funing	2023	5
Suqian	2023	5
Selmer	2025	5

== See also ==
- List of F4, EF4, and IF4 tornadoes
- List of F4 and EF4 tornadoes (2010–2019)
- List of F4, EF4, and IF4 tornadoes (2020–present)
- List of F4 and EF4 tornadoes (2000–2009)
- List of F5, EF5, and IF5 tornadoes
