= George Ladd =

George Ladd may refer to:

- George Ladd (Medal of Honor) (1828/29–1889), American Civil War Medal of Honor recipient
- George Eldon Ladd (1911–1982), American theologian
- George Trumbull Ladd (1842–1921), American philosopher
- George W. Ladd (1818–1892), U.S. Representative from Maine
- George Wells Ladd (1925–2016), American economist
- George Ladd (silversmith), 19th-century American silversmith
