= Ladd =

Ladd or Ladds may refer to:

== People ==
- Ladd (surname)
- Brent Ladds (born 1951), Canadian ice hockey administrator
- Ladd McConkey (born 2001), American football player

== Places in the United States ==
- Ladds, Georgia, an unincorporated community
- Ladd, Illinois, a village
- Ladd, Missouri, an unincorporated community
- Ladd, Virginia, a village
- Ladd Peak, a mountain in Wyoming

== Businesses ==
- The Ladd Company, a film production and distribution company
- LADD Furniture, now part of La-Z-Boy
- Ladd's cordials, a soft drink company in Adelaide, South Australia

== Other uses ==
- Ladd's Addition, Portland, Oregon, United States, a neighborhood of Portland
- Ladd Arboretum, Evanston, Illinois, United States
- Ladd Army Airfield, military airfield at Fort Jonathan Wainwright, Fairbanks, Alaska, United States
- Ladd Observatory, an astronomical observatory of Brown University, Providence, Rhode Island, United States

== See also ==
- Lad (disambiguation)
