= Land Assembly =

A Land Assembly or Assembly of the Land is an assembly of landowners and can refer to:

- Zemskyy Sobor, the Assembly of the Land of the Russian Empire.
  - Sobor of 1613, an emergency assembly of the Sobor.
- Land Assembly of the Slovak Land or Assembly of the Slovak Land, legislative bodies within Czechoslovakia.
- Land assembly district, a real estate term used in the United States.
