= Ladd (surname) =

Ladd is a surname. Notable people with the surname include:

- Alan Ladd (1913–1964), American film actor
- Alan Ladd, Jr. (1937–2022), American film industry executive and producer
- Andrew Ladd (b. 1985), Canadian ice hockey player
- Aspen Ladd (b. 1995), mixed martial arts fighter
- Azel P. Ladd (1811–1854), American educator
- Cheryl Ladd (b. 1951), American actress and singer
- Christine Ladd-Franklin (1847–1930), American psychologist and logician
- Diane Ladd (1935–2025), American actress
- Donna Ladd (b. 1961), American journalist
- Edwin F. Ladd (1859–1925), American politician
- Ernie Ladd (1938–2007), American football player and wrestler
- George Ladd (disambiguation)
  - George Ladd (Medal of Honor recipient) (1828 or 1829–1889), American Civil War soldier
  - George Eldon Ladd (1911–1982), American minister and professor
  - George Trumbull Ladd (1842–1921), American philosopher and psychologist
- Herbert W. Ladd (1843–1913), American politician
- Helen Ladd, education economist
- Jean Ladd (1923–2009), All-American Girls Professional Baseball League player
- Jesse A. Ladd (1887–1957), United States military officer
- Jim Ladd (1948–2023), American radio personality
- Jordan Ladd (b. 1975), American actress
- Joseph Onesimus Ladd (1818–1882), founder of Ladd's cordials in Adelaide, South Australia
- Kate Macy Ladd (1863–1945), American philanthropist
- Margaret Ladd (b. 1942), American actress
- Mike Ladd, American musician
- Mike Ladd (poet) (b. 1959), Australian poet
- Milton Ladd, American politician
- Pete Ladd (1956–2023), American baseball pitcher
- PJ Ladd (b. 1983), American skateboarder
- William Ladd (1778–1841), American philanthropist and peace advocate
- William S. Ladd (1826–1893), American banker and politician
