= Lad =

Lad or lads may refer to:

== Lad ==
- Lad, a term for a boy or young man
- Lad culture, a British subculture

=== Arts and entertainment ===
- Lad (video game), 2012 iOS game
- Love and Deepspace, sometimes abbreviated to "LaDS"
- Lad, A Dog, a collection of short stories by Albert Payson Terhune
- The Lads, a New Zealand Christian rock-pop band
- Like a Dragon (franchise), a series of video games by Sega, also known as Yakuza outside Japan
- Zeus and Apollo, two Doberman Pinschers appearing in the Magnum, P.I. TV series and its remake
- Lad, A Yorkshire Story (2013) a film about a teenager in England.

=== Places ===
- Lad, Bhiwani, Haryana, India
- Ląd, Greater Poland Voivodeship, Poland
- Lad, Hungary, a village in Hungary

== LAD ==
LAD is a three-letter abbreviation that may refer to:

=== Organizations ===
- Lietuvos apsaugos dalys, a term for Lithuanian Auxiliary Police battalions
- Light Aid Detachment, a subunit in some Commonwealth army engineer corps
- Los Angeles Dodgers, a Californian baseball team, which played in Brooklyn prior to 1958
- Lycée Alexandre Dumas, a school in Haiti
- Laboratoire suisse d'analyse du dopage, French name of the Swiss Laboratory for Doping Analyses
- Local authority district, a type of local government area in the United Kingdom
- Lauren Aston Designs

=== Science and medicine ===
- Lamina-associating domains, regions of the chromosome that interact with the nuclear lamina; see Nuclear organization § Lamina-associating domains and nucleolar-associating domains
- Language acquisition device, part of the human brain structure as proposed by Noam Chomsky
- Least absolute deviations, a mathematical optimization technique
- Left anterior descending artery, a coronary artery branch
- Left axis deviation, a condition in electrocardiography
- Leukocyte adhesion deficiency
- Locally advanced disease, a stage in cancer staging
- Lymphadenopathy
- Lysergic acid diethylamide, commonly known as LSD

=== Transportation ===
- LAD, the national rail station code for Ladywell railway station in Ladywell, London
- LAD, the IATA airport code for Quatro de Fevereiro Airport in Luanda, Angola

=== Others ===
- lad, the ISO 639 alpha-2 for Judaeo-Spanish or Ladino language
- Laboratory aim density, a system in motion picture printmaking; see China Girl (filmmaking)
- Land assembly district, a proposed legal regime for assembling land

== See also ==
- Ladd (disambiguation)
