= List of tornadoes in the 2020 Easter tornado outbreak =

During Easter Sunday and Monday in 2020 (April 12–13), a large and destructive tornado outbreak occurred across the Southern and Eastern United States. The total number of tornadoes confirmed from the outbreak is 141 over the course of 37 hours and 24 minutes.

== Confirmed tornadoes ==
Daily statistics
Date	Total	EFU	EF0	EF1	EF2	EF3	EF4	EF5	Deaths	Injuries
April 12	68	0	10	39	13	4	2	0	22	163
April 13	73	0	22	35	6	9	1	0	10	99
Total	141	0	32	74	19	13	3	0	32	262

=== April 12 event ===
List of confirmed tornadoes – Sunday, April 12, 2020 (Note: All dates are based on the local time zone where the tornado touched down; however, all times are in Coordinated Universal Time for consistency.)
EF#	Location	County / Parish	State	Start Coord.	Time (UTC)	Path length	Max width
EF1	SW of Ozona	Crockett	TX	30.5048°N 101.3172°W	06:03–06:16	5.62 mi (9.04 km)	250 yd (230 m)
EF1	A tornado snapped or uprooted multiple trees, damaged a power pole, downed electrical lines, and destroyed a deer blind and some fencing. The awning and AC unit of a mobile home were blown off as well.						
EF1	NNW of Melvin to S of Pear Valley	McCulloch	TX	31.2145°N 99.5846°W	09:05–09:13	5.12 mi (8.24 km)	300 yd (270 m)
EF1	A tornado snapped or uprooted multiple oak trees and killed one calf. It also destroyed several deer feeders, overturned a truck and a cattle feeder, damaged large doors on a barn, and knocked over a fence.						
EF1	NE of Fredericksburg to SE of Willow City	Gillespie	TX	30.3007°N 98.8248°W	09:40–09:56	11.56 mi (18.60 km)	150 yd (140 m)
EF1	A tornado caused extensive tree damage near Fredericksburg. One home sustained roof damage and a power line was knocked down as well.						
EF1	Northern Round Mountain	Blanco, Burnet	TX	30.4397°N 98.3605°W	10:23–10:34	6.96 mi (11.20 km)	200 yd (180 m)
EF1	The tornado struck two RV parks at the north side of Round Mountain, damaging 49 residences, eight of which received major damage, and destroying 11. There were two minor injuries.						
EF0	SE of Mexia	Limestone	TX	31.6552°N 96.4298°W	11:05–11:06	0.22 mi (0.35 km)	50 yd (46 m)
EF0	Area storm spotters observed this brief, weak tornado, which touched down within a larger area of damaging straight-line winds in Point Enterprise. Grass was flattened in a convergent pattern.						
EF1	SE of Timpson	Shelby	TX	31.8921°N 94.3827°W	14:06–14:07	0.74 mi (1.19 km)	30 yd (27 m)
EF1	A brief tornado snapped or uprooted about 50 trees.						
EF1	E of Gill to W of Jonesville	Harrison	TX	32.399°N 94.2764°W	14:08–14:20	10.59 mi (17.04 km)	100 yd (91 m)
EF1	Trees and power lines were downed along the path, including one tree that fell on a house.						
EF2	N of Grand Cane to SSE of Frierson	Desoto	LA	32.1493°N 93.7946°W	14:41–14:53	9.05 mi (14.56 km)	400 yd (370 m)
EF2	Four single-wide manufactured homes were destroyed, two homes were partially unroofed and had exterior walls knocked down, a third home was unroofed with a portion of it being shifted off its foundation, and a fourth home lost parts of its roof and sustained damage to an exterior wall and its carport. Roof and shingle damage was inflicted to a church and additional homes as well. Hundreds of trees were also snapped or uprooted. One people was injured.						
EF1	Benton	Bossier	LA	32.6975°N 93.7439°W	14:52–14:53	0.43 mi (0.69 km)	125 yd (114 m)
EF1	This brief tornado moved through the center of Benton. Several buildings in town suffered roof damage, including a feed store that had its flat roof covering ripped off. A single-family home had its roof removed and large porch dislodged and the bay doors at a fire station were blown in as well.						
EF1	NE of Mansfield to NW of East Point	Desoto, Red River	LA	32.1448°N 93.5866°W	14:57–15:05	6.65 mi (10.70 km)	300 yd (270 m)
EF1	Numerous trees were snapped or uprooted.						
EF1	SSE of Doyline to W of Heflin	Webster	LA	32.4272°N 93.3805°W	15:10–15:18	6.13 mi (9.87 km)	1,000 yd (910 m)
EF1	A large tornado caused roof damage to multiple homes, moved a small metal storage building several yards away from its foundation, and snapped or uprooted trees.						
EF1	NW of Ashland	Bienville	LA	32.1488°N 93.1185°W	15:30–15:31	1.62 mi (2.61 km)	400 yd (370 m)
EF1	Widespread tree damage occurred, with numerous trees snapped at their trunks, and a few homes sustained minor roof damage. The path of the tornado likely continued on for another mile or two according to radar data, but the area was inaccessible to survey teams.						
EF1	Northwestern Arcadia	Bienville	LA	32.5636°N 92.9451°W	15:39–15:44	0.77 mi (1.24 km)	75 yd (69 m)
EF1	A brief high-end EF1 tornado destroyed a small outbuilding, partially unroofed a house, and rolled a mobile home off its foundation.						
EF3	Bawcomville to Southern Monroe to Monroe Regional Airport	Ouachita	LA	32.4706°N 92.1699°W	16:36–16:45	8.01 mi (12.89 km)	300 yd (270 m)
EF3	See section on this tornado						
EF3	WSW of Fairbanks	Ouachita	LA	32.6215°N 92.0977°W	16:39–16:43	2.6 mi (4.2 km)	400 yd (370 m)
EF3	A low-end EF3 tornado ripped the roofs off of two single-family homes and inflicted shingle damage to ten other homes. An outbuilding was destroyed, four concrete poles were snapped, and hundreds of trees were snapped or uprooted, including some that were partially debarked. The tornado occurred simultaneously with the tornado listed above.						
EF1	Fairbanks	Ouachita	LA	32.6452°N 92.035°W	16:46–16:48	1.14 mi (1.83 km)	50 yd (46 m)
EF1	A brief tornado snapped or uprooted approximately 30 trees.						
EF1	E of Collinston	Morehouse	LA	32.6814°N 91.8239°W	17:02–17:06	3.03 mi (4.88 km)	200 yd (180 m)
EF1	One home sustained roof damage and a nearby shed was destroyed with debris scattered 100 yd (91 m) away. Multiple trees were snapped or uprooted.						
EF2	ENE of Oak Ridge to NNW of Epps	Morehouse, Richland, West Carroll	LA	32.65°N 91.65°W	17:10–17:22	9.52 mi (15.32 km)	700 yd (640 m)
EF2	Multiple homes and mobile homes sustained minor roof damage, and motor home was overturned. Several sheds were also damaged. Low-end EF2 damage occurred as five power poles were snapped and numerous trees were snapped or uprooted in Bear Skin, including one tree that fell on and damaged a house.						
EF1	WSW of Epps	Richland, West Carroll	LA	32.5597°N 91.5798°W	17:11–17:16	4.65 mi (7.48 km)	150 yd (140 m)
EF1	Twin tornadoes developed at the same time with this one being the western one. Multiple trees were uprooted, and an irrigation pivot was overturned.						
EF1	W of Epps	Richland, West Carroll	LA	32.596°N 91.6168°W	17:11–17:20	6.18 mi (9.95 km)	700 yd (640 m)
EF1	Twin tornadoes developed at the same time with this one being the eastern one. Several trees were uprooted, and irrigation pivots were overturned.						
EF0	Lake Providence	East Carroll	LA	32.7942°N 91.1793°W	17:41–17:43	1.16 mi (1.87 km)	170 yd (160 m)
EF0	A brief high-end EF0 tornado impacted Lake Providence, causing minor roof, facade, and window damage to homes, apartment buildings, and businesses in town. Minor and sporadic tree damage occurred along the path as well.						
EF1	E of Cary	Sharkey	MS	32.787°N 90.8925°W	18:00–18:08	6.02 mi (9.69 km)	200 yd (180 m)
EF1	An area of downed trees consistent with a high-end EF1 tornado was noted on satellite imagery in the Delta National Forest, which corresponded with a TDS that was noted on radar when the storm moved through the area. A ground survey was impossible due to backwater flooding.						
EF1	SE of Louise	Humphreys	MS	32.9296°N 90.5931°W	18:17–18:22	4.09 mi (6.58 km)	440 yd (400 m)
EF1	A mobile home had its roof torn off and was pushed off its foundation by this high-end EF1 tornado. Numerous trees and power poles were snapped.						
EF2	NW of Yazoo City	Yazoo	MS	32.8574°N 90.5208°W	18:22–18:32	7.38 mi (11.88 km)	250 yd (230 m)
EF2	A small and poorly anchored home of wood construction was obliterated and swept away. Several power poles and trees were snapped, and four outbuildings were destroyed with a fifth one being unroofed as well.						
EF0	ENE of Eden	Holmes	MS	33.0049°N 90.2608°W	18:46–18:48	2.33 mi (3.75 km)	50 yd (46 m)
EF0	A brief tornado caused minor damage to an outbuilding and a few trees.						
EF1	W of Sallis	Attala	MS	32.9961°N 89.8541°W	19:06–19:09	2.46 mi (3.96 km)	500 yd (460 m)
EF1	Numerous trees were snapped and a home sustained roof damage.						
EF0	E of McCool	Choctaw	MS	33.1961°N 89.3018°W	19:47–19:51	3.04 mi (4.89 km)	150 yd (140 m)
EF0	A short-lived tornado caused minor tree damage.						
EF2	NW of Macon to E of Brooksville	Noxubee	MS	33.1469°N 88.6044°W	20:30–20:40	8.49 mi (13.66 km)	1,100 yd (1,000 m)
EF2	A large rain-wrapped tornado downed six large electrical transmission poles, damaged some metal lumber storage warehouses, and caused extensive tree and power line damage. A house sustained roof damage, a pivot irrigation sprinkler was flipped and thrown, and four chicken houses were damaged.						
EF4	SW of Sartinville to SW of Bassfield	Walthall, Lawrence, Marion, Jefferson Davis	MS	31.2763°N 90.1732°W	20:39–21:06	21.17 mi (34.07 km)	1,936 yd (1,770 m)
EF4	4 deaths – See section on this tornado – At least three people were injured.						
EF1	W of Tom Bevill Lock and Dam	Noxubee	MS	33.2352°N 88.4308°W	20:42–20:48	3.89 mi (6.26 km)	375 yd (343 m)
EF1	Many trees were snapped or uprooted.						
EF4	SSW of Bassfield to NNE of Pachuta	Jefferson Davis, Covington, Jones, Jasper, Clarke	MS	31.4641°N 89.7579°W	21:12–22:28	67.43 mi (108.52 km)	3,960 yd (3,620 m)
EF4	8 deaths – See an article on this tornado – 99 people were injured.						
EF0	SSE of Ethelsville	Pickens	AL	33.3697°N 88.1937°W	21:01–21:03	1.51 mi (2.43 km)	200 yd (180 m)
EF0	A tornado snapped or felled multiple trees.						
EF0	N of Zion to W of Newtonville	Pickens, Fayette	AL	33.4593°N 87.8859°W	21:18–21:26	5.45 mi (8.77 km)	300 yd (270 m)
EF0	A tornado snapped or uprooted multiple trees.						
EF0	SE of Fayette	Fayette	AL	33.5878°N 87.7504°W	21:34–21:36	1.79 mi (2.88 km)	350 yd (320 m)
EF0	A brief tornado uprooted several trees and snapped tree limbs.						
EF3	ESE of Topeka to SW of Rose Hill	Lawrence, Jefferson Davis, Covington, Jones, Smith, Jasper	MS	31.3712°N 90.1101°W	21:36–23:07	83.22 mi (133.93 km)	2,041 yd (1,866 m)
EF3	See section on this tornado – At least two people were injured.						
EF1	SSE of Berry to NNW of Boley Springs	Fayette, Walker	AL	33.6264°N 87.5872°W	21:41–21:49	6.14 mi (9.88 km)	600 yd (550 m)
EF1	A tornado uprooted several trees and snapped tree limbs. A few homes also had shingle damage.						
EF1	S of Cordova to S of Dora	Walker	AL	33.6319°N 87.2022°W	22:04–22:16	8.98 mi (14.45 km)	950 yd (870 m)
EF1	This tornado began just south of the Gorgas Steam Plant and moved northeast, crossing the Mulberry Fork River several times. Numerous trees were snapped or uprooted, some of which fell on homes. Additional homes had minor roof damage.						
EF2	SE of Dora to E of Sumiton	Walker, Jefferson	AL	33.6991°N 87.0534°W	22:14–22:25	6.91 mi (11.12 km)	940 yd (860 m)
EF2	A large, strong tornado destroyed a metal building, ripped the roofs off a few homes, and inflicted less severe damage to several other homes. Trees were snapped or uprooted as well, some of which landed on houses.						
EF2	S of Pachuta to Eastern Enterprise	Clarke	MS	32.0015°N 88.8943°W	22:22–22:39	14.29 mi (23.00 km)	300 yd (270 m)
EF2	This strong tornado passed east of Pachuta and west of Stonewall, before striking the east side of Enterprise. A mobile home was destroyed, a site-built home sustained heavy roof damage, the back wall of a church was collapsed, and numerous trees were snapped. Two people were injured. The tornado formed to the east of and was on the ground simultaneously with the long-tracked EF4 tornado during the beginning of its life.						
EF0	SW of Locust Fork	Blount	AL	33.8819°N 86.6877°W	22:44–22:45	0.47 mi (0.76 km)	125 yd (114 m)
EF0	A brief, weak tornado downed several trees. Two homes sustained minor roof damage.						
EF1	W of Locust Fork	Blount	AL	33.8977°N 86.6549°W	22:47–22:51	3.84 mi (6.18 km)	225 yd (206 m)
EF1	A tornado snapped or uprooted numerous trees. Two homes and one vehicle suffered damage from fallen trees.						
EF1	S of Meridian	Lauderdale	MS	32.2571°N 88.6932°W	22:47–22:49	2.88 mi (4.63 km)	300 yd (270 m)
EF1	Two homes sustained minor roof damage, and several trees were uprooted. This was the fourth and final tornado produced by the supercell that produced the EF4 tornadoes.						
EF2	W of Oneonta to E of Rosa	Blount	AL	33.9384°N 86.5677°W	22:50–22:57	5.56 mi (8.95 km)	500 yd (460 m)
EF2	A house suffered moderate roof damage, and another was swept off its foundation and blown 60 ft (18 m) away, leaving the structure heavily damaged. A mobile home was rolled off its foundation, two sheds were destroyed, and numerous trees were snapped or uprooted.						
EF1	W of Altoona	Blount	AL	34.0264°N 86.3916°W	23:04–23:05	0.78 mi (1.26 km)	115 yd (105 m)
EF1	Numerous trees were snapped or uprooted. At least three farm buildings and a large silo were damaged on a farm property.						
EF1	NW of Ramsey to ESE of Ridgeville	Etowah	AL	33.9987°N 86.1577°W	23:08–23:13	5.52 mi (8.88 km)	525 yd (480 m)
EF1	Damage was primarily limited to snapped or uprooted trees, though one home sustained minor roof and porch damage.						
EF1	NW of Rose Hill to Western Enterprise	Jasper, Clarke	MS	32.1209°N 88.9602°W	23:10–23:17	8.87 mi (14.27 km)	985 yd (901 m)
EF1	A large tornado formed after the long-tracked Oak Vale EF3 tornado dissipated. It snapped or uprooted numerous trees along its path, and inflicted roof damage to homes in the western part of Enterprise.						
EF2	SE of Snead to S of Crossville	Blount, Etowah, Marshall, Dekalb	AL	34.0721°N 86.3249°W	23:10–23:33	21.74 mi (34.99 km)	440 yd (400 m)
EF2	A strong tornado struck a residential area at the southwestern edge of Boaz, where numerous homes were damaged, some significantly with loss of roofs and exterior walls. One unanchored home was pushed off its foundation and completely destroyed, and a metal industrial building was also heavily damaged. Several self-storage units were destroyed as well. Elsewhere along the path, numerous trees were snapped or uprooted, and a few other homes sustained roof damage. Three people were injured.						
EF2	NE of Attalla to NE of Keener	Etowah	AL	34.0419°N 86.0704°W	23:14–23:28	12.19 mi (19.62 km)	875 yd (800 m)
EF2	Large swaths of trees were flattened along the path, with numerous large trees snapped or uprooted in and around Reece City. Several of these trees landed on homes and outbuildings, and many power poles were snapped as well. A barn was also significantly damaged, and a few homes sustained roof damage.						
EF2	NW of Summerville to SE of LaFayette	Chattooga, Walker	GA	34.4990°N 85.3689°W	00:15–00:32	14.73 mi (23.71 km)	800 yd (730 m)
EF2	The entire second story of a house was destroyed, another home had its garage collapsed and a large portion of its roof removed, while shingles and siding were ripped off of other homes. A trailer was destroyed, a barn was heavily damaged, and numerous large trees were snapped or uprooted along the path. A jeep was tossed more than 150 yd (140 m), and a 10,000 lb (4,500 kg) camper was overturned.						
EF1	Carbon Hill	Walker	AL	33.8795°N 87.5472°W	01:12–01:16	2.9 mi (4.7 km)	1,000 yd (910 m)
EF1	A large, high-end EF1 tornado moved directly through Carbon Hill, where considerable damage to homes and some businesses occurred, a few of which had large portions of their roofs ripped off. A gas station canopy was blown over and flipped upside-down; a church was destroyed; and several mobile homes were either rolled and demolished, shifted off their block piers, or sustained significant loss of roofs and walls. Dozens of trees were snapped or uprooted, some of which landed on homes. Outbuildings were destroyed as well, and three people were injured.						
EF1	N of Holt to SSW of Bankhead Lake Dam	Tuscaloosa	AL	33.2831°N 87.5015°W	01:33–01:44	9.86 mi (15.87 km)	230 yd (210 m)
EF1	A tornado touched down near the NorthRiver Yacht Club community, causing extensive tree damage and minor roof damage to homes from fallen trees. It then crossed the Black Warrior River, snapping or uprooting hundreds of trees in the area before dissipating just west of the Jefferson County border.						
EF2	NW of Chatsworth to SW of Cisco	Murray	GA	34.8098°N 84.8377°W	01:45–01:55	8.88 mi (14.29 km)	860 yd (790 m)
EF2	8 deaths – See section on this tornado – 24 people were injured.						
EF1	E of Wilson Bend	Cullman	AL	33.9984°N 87.0368°W	01:51–01:56	2.97 mi (4.78 km)	200 yd (180 m)
EF1	Several chicken houses were destroyed, dozens of trees were uprooted, and a shed was damaged.						
EF1	S of Good Hope to NW of Hanceville	Cullman	AL	34.0736°N 86.8747°W	02:00–02:09	5.42 mi (8.72 km)	300 yd (270 m)
EF1	Dozens of trees were snapped or uprooted, a single-wide trailer had its roof blown off, and a gas station was damaged.						
EF1	SW of Cullomburg	Choctaw	AL	31.7065°N 88.3161°W	02:03–02:04	0.41 mi (0.66 km)	450 yd (410 m)
EF1	A brief tornado snapped numerous trees within a broader area of straight-line winds. In November 2023, this tornado was reanalyzed and had its width expanded from 75 yd (69 m) to 450 yd (410 m) based on the extent of deforestation noted in high-resolution Planet satellite imagery.						
EF1	NNE of Hanceville	Cullman	AL	34.1329°N 86.7377°W	02:11–02:12	0.35 mi (0.56 km)	70 yd (64 m)
EF1	A brief tornado destroyed a small shed and uprooted several trees.						
EF2	SE of Welti to SW of Holly Pond	Cullman	AL	34.1239°N 86.7087°W	02:12–02:16	2.5 mi (4.0 km)	350 yd (320 m)
EF2	A tornado touched down near the Duck River and uprooted numerous trees in the area. Two homes and a barn had their roofs completely removed.						
EF1	West Bend	Clarke	AL	31.7980°N 88.1340°W	02:16–02:17	0.77 mi (1.24 km)	100 yd (91 m)
EF1	A brief tornado snapped numerous trees within a broader area of straight-line winds.						
EF1	NNE of Brooksville to NNE of Mclarty	Blount, Marshall	AL	34.2201°N 86.459°W	02:30–02:35	4.97 mi (8.00 km)	200 yd (180 m)
EF1	Dozens of trees were uprooted, and a couple of homes sustained minor roof damage.						
EF1	N of Vineland to ESE of Lamison	Marengo, Wilcox	AL	32.0443°N 87.6583°W	02:41–02:49	8.05 mi (12.96 km)	1,000 yd (910 m)
EF1	A large tornado snapped or uprooted numerous trees, one of which landed on a mobile home, causing severe damage to the structure.						
EF1	SE of Higdon, AL to S of Trenton, GA	Dekalb (AL), Dade (GA)	AL, GA	34.8349°N 85.6120°W	02:50–03:05	7.54 mi (12.13 km)	350 yd (320 m)
EF1	A tornado tore large sections of roofing off a church and a metal building. Mobile homes sustained minor damage, a small outbuilding was destroyed, and trees were snapped. The tornado continued into Georgia where it damaged nearly 100 homes in and around the city of Trenton.						
EF1	ESE of Heiberger	Perry	AL	32.7317°N 87.2012°W	03:14–03:18	2.42 mi (3.89 km)	350 yd (320 m)
EF1	A church had part of its roof torn off, and a nearby building on the property was destroyed. Extensive tree damage occurred along the path.						
EF3	Fort Oglethorpe, GA to S of McDonald, TN	Catoosa (GA), Hamilton (TN), Bradley (TN)	GA, TN	34.9407°N 85.2582°W	03:15–03:33	19.34 mi (31.12 km)	1,500 yd (1,400 m)
EF3	2 deaths – See section on this tornado – A total of 18 people were injured.						
EF0	NE of Collinsville	DeKalb	AL	34.2744°N 85.8560°W	03:22–03:28	3.56 mi (5.73 km)	110 yd (100 m)
EF0	Several trees were downed, and a small barn was destroyed.						
EF0	SE of Sardis to S of Tyler	Dallas	AL	32.2440°N 86.9515°W	03:27–03:31	3.8 mi (6.1 km)	400 yd (370 m)
EF0	A tornado caused extensive tree damage along its path.						
EF2	Eastern Cleveland	Bradley	TN	35.1613°N 84.864°W	03:45–03:50	3.04 mi (4.89 km)	500 yd (460 m)
EF2	A strong tornado caused significant damage in the eastern part of Cleveland, where 26 homes or mobile homes were destroyed, 23 sustained major damage, and 62 had minor damage. A church and a storage garage also sustained heavy damage. A small metal truss transmission tower was blown over, and a metal industrial building sustained damage. Numerous trees were snapped or uprooted along the path. Six people were injured.						
EF1	E of Cleveland	Bradley	TN	35.1663°N 84.8242°W	03:50–03:55	5.09 mi (8.19 km)	500 yd (460 m)
EF1	Several homes sustained significant roof damage and barns were destroyed. Hundreds of trees were snapped or uprooted.						
EF1	E of Tasso	Bradley, Polk	TN	35.2046°N 84.7751°W	03:55–04:00	4.73 mi (7.61 km)	500 yd (460 m)
EF1	Hundreds of trees were snapped or uprooted and a few homes sustained minor damage.						

=== April 13 event ===
List of confirmed tornadoes – Monday, April 13, 2020
EF#	Location	County / Parish	State	Start Coord.	Time (UTC)	Path length	Max width
EF0	WNW of Cave Spring	Floyd	GA	34.1239°N 85.3675°W	04:31–04:32	0.13 mi (0.21 km)	50 yd (46 m)
EF0	Several trees were downed and large tree limbs were broken off by a brief tornado.						
EF0	N of Lindale to W of Rome	Floyd	GA	34.1924°N 85.1735°W	04:42–04:45	3.21 mi (5.17 km)	50 yd (46 m)
EF0	A brief tornado downed multiple trees, some of which fell on power lines.						
EF1	Ladds to E of White	Bartow	GA	34.1492°N 84.8285°W	05:06–05:21	12.76 mi (20.54 km)	250 yd (230 m)
EF1	1 death – A tornado touched down west-southwest of Cartersville in the Ladds area, causing minor damage to a small business and downing fences. In southwestern Cartersville, a large oak tree fell on a house, killing the sleeping occupant. Mostly minor tree damage occurred elsewhere in town. The tornado continued to the northeast of Cartersville, where numerous trees were snapped or uprooted, power lines were downed, and one home was damaged. The tornado continued into the Pine Log Wildlife Management Area where 60–70 trees were downed before it dissipated. Two people were injured.						
EF1	SSW of Salacoa Valley	Cherokee	GA	34.3524°N 84.6028°W	05:32–05:33	0.71 mi (1.14 km)	100 yd (91 m)
EF1	This tornado was spawned by the same circulation that produced the previous tornado. Around 250 to 300 trees were downed northwest of Waleska.						
EF0	NW of Waverly Hall	Harris	GA	32.7279°N 84.7294°W	05:53–05:55	3.76 mi (6.05 km)	50 yd (46 m)
EF0	Several trees in a remote and forested area were downed.						
EF0	NW of Woodland	Talbot	GA	32.7516°N 84.5144°W	06:08–06:10	2.94 mi (4.73 km)	100 yd (91 m)
EF0	Trees downed by the tornado blocked several roads.						
EF3	S of Thomaston to NW of Redbone	Upson, Lamar	GA	32.8496°N 84.3335°W	06:19–06:35	16.63 mi (26.76 km)	1,200 yd (1,100 m)
EF3	This large, intense tornado damaged or destroyed dozens of homes, mobile homes, and outbuildings along its path. One home was pushed off its foundation into the middle of a road, leaving it largely intact. Numerous trees were snapped or uprooted as well. A total of 159 structures were affected by the tornado, with seven destroyed, 20 with major damage, and 38 sustaining minor damage. The National Weather Service's WSR-88D radar detected debris lofted up to 25,000 ft (7,600 m) while this tornado was on the ground.						
EF0	NNE of Union City	Fulton	GA	33.6288°N 84.5263°W	06:36–06:39	2.75 mi (4.43 km)	50 yd (46 m)
EF0	A short-lived tornado snapped or uprooted many trees; debris was detected by the local NWS's radar up to 1,000 ft (300 m).						
EF3	SW of Collier to NNW of Forsyth	Monroe	GA	33.0928°N 84.033°W	06:40–06:47	5.3 mi (8.5 km)	300 yd (270 m)
EF3	This tornado was spawned by the same circulation that produced the previous EF3 tornado. A large metal-framed building was completely destroyed, with concrete footings ripped out of the ground. A small home was destroyed, with a small plane, a tractor, and a boat flipped nearby. Some vehicles were flipped and thrown as well, and numerous trees were downed along the path, one of which fell onto a home. One person was injured. NWS radar detected debris up to 19,000 ft (5,800 m).						
EF1	W of Raoul to SSW of Boydville	Hall, Habersham, Banks, Stephens	GA	33.456°N 83.6449°W	06:49–07:06	14.31 mi (23.03 km)	200 yd (180 m)
EF1	This was the first tornado from the Seneca supercell. Numerous trees were snapped or uprooted, and one mobile home sustained minor to moderate roof damage.						
EF1	WNW of Payne	Bibb	GA	32.873°N 83.7718°W	07:00–07:04	3.68 mi (5.92 km)	300 yd (270 m)
EF1	This tornado touched down near I-475, causing minor roof damage to two hotels and a Walmart. A nearby Walgreens had all of its windows blown out and a hole punctured into its roof. A gas station canopy also had metal sheeting torn off. Extensive tree damage occurred farther along the path, with several falling on homes.						
EF1	S of Boydville to NE of Eastanollee	Stephens	GA	34.513°N 83.367°W	07:07–07:15	8.73 mi (14.05 km)	500 yd (460 m)
EF1	Numerous trees were snapped or uprooted and a few homes sustained considerable damage as a result of this high-end EF1 tornado. This was the second tornado produced by the Seneca tornado.						
EF1	NW of Salem	Oconee	SC	34.99°N 83.055°W	07:18–07:22	3.97 mi (6.39 km)	400 yd (370 m)
EF1	Hundreds of trees were snapped or uprooted. The tornado path may have extended into the Sumter National Forest and into Pickens County, but no additional damage was visible from accessible areas.						
EF1	Willard to WSW of Phoenix	Putnam	GA	33.3098°N 83.4961°W	07:18–07:34	12.91 mi (20.78 km)	300 yd (270 m)
EF1	A tornado touched down in the Chattahoochee–Oconee National Forest, snapping or uprooting hundreds of trees across the park. Three homes sustained minor roof damage, while a silo and nearby barn sustained damage as well. One person was injured.						
EF3	SSE of Westminster to Seneca to W of Central	Oconee, Pickens	SC	34.617°N 83.084°W	07:21–07:36	16.71 mi (26.89 km)	1,000 yd (910 m)
EF3	1 death – See section on this tornado – Five people were injured.						
EF1	NNW of Reynolds Plantation to Veazey	Greene	GA	33.4443°N 83.228°W	07:38–07:47	6.4 mi (10.3 km)	350 yd (320 m)
EF1	This tornado was spawned by the same circulation that produced the previous EF1 tornado. The tornado moved through a residential subdivision, snapping or uprooting numerous trees. Several well-built homes sustained direct damage or impacts from airborne debris. At Lake Oconee, numerous boathouses sustained major damage and a dock was lofted and thrown onshore. After crossing, the lake the tornado felled many more trees, several of which fell on homes. It later dissipated as it moved into Veaszy. A total of 35–40 homes were damaged by the tornado.						
EF2	S of Pumpkintown	Pickens, Greenville	SC	34.966°N 82.667°W	07:41–07:49	7.97 mi (12.83 km)	200 yd (180 m)
EF2	Two mobile homes were destroyed and numerous trees were snapped or uprooted. Three people were injured.						
EF0	SW of Berea to WSW of Easley	Pickens	SC	34.817°N 82.638°W	07:44–07:51	7.42 mi (11.94 km)	70 yd (64 m)
EF0	Trees were downed along the path.						
EF0	NW of Greer	Greenville	SC	34.992°N 82.295°W	08:01–08:02	0.68 mi (1.09 km)	30 yd (27 m)
EF0	Trees were snapped or uprooted. One uprooted tree fell on a house.						
EF0	SW of Oconee	Washington	GA	32.8329°N 82.9698°W	08:01–08:03	1.66 mi (2.67 km)	50 yd (46 m)
EF0	Damage along the path was limited to trees.						
EF1	NNW of Warthen	Washington	GA	33.1199°N 82.8228°W	08:05–08:09	3.08 mi (4.96 km)	100 yd (91 m)
EF1	Multiple trees were uprooted.						
EF1	SW of Mitchell	Washington	GA	33.1992°N 82.7831°W	08:12–08:14	1.01 mi (1.63 km)	100 yd (91 m)
EF1	A brief tornado snapped hundreds softwood trees.						
EF1	NE of Harrison to S of Bartow	Washington, Jefferson	GA	33.8613°N 82.6972°W	08:18–08:32	14.22 mi (22.88 km)	220 yd (200 m)
EF1	Hundreds of softwood-type trees were snapped, dozens of homes were damaged, and two vehicles were thrown 100 yards (91 m).						
EF2	NE of Vidette to ESE of Hephzibah	Burke	GA	33.1066°N 82.1918°W	08:53–09:07	16.49 mi (26.54 km)	700 yd (640 m)
EF2	A cinder-block automotive business sustained uplift of its roof and partial collapse of its walls, and a home sustained roof and exterior wall loss. A dairy farm suffered extensive damage, and hundreds of trees were snapped or uprooted, some of which landed on homes and vehicles.						
EF3	W of Savannah River Site to WNW of Neeses	Aiken, Barnwell, Orangeburg	SC	33.2751°N 81.7048°W	09:21–10:03	37.88 mi (60.96 km)	800 yd (730 m)
EF3	A few frame homes sustained roof loss and collapse of exterior walls, and some mobile homes were damaged or destroyed by this intense, long-tracked tornado. A brick shed, a vacant cinder-block business, and a cinder-block workshop building were completely destroyed. Another business had a large portion of its roof removed and an exterior wall blown out, and a metal automotive service building had its roof and multiple exterior walls ripped off. Vehicles were moved and damaged and power poles were snapped. Large swaths of trees were flattened along the path, some of which were partially debarked. Trees were also downed in the town of Springfield before the tornado dissipated, a few of which landed on a home and a church.						
EF3	WNW of Snelling to SW of Elko	Barnwell	SC	33.2754°N 81.5438°W	09:33–09:42	8.49 mi (13.66 km)	50 yd (46 m)
EF3	A small, but strong tornado moved through the Crackerneck Wildlife Management Area and Ecological Reserve, snapping, denuding, and partially debarking numerous trees.						
EF1	W of Ty Ty	Worth, Tift	GA	31.48°N 83.7°W	09:36–09:40	3.62 mi (5.83 km)	100 yd (91 m)
EF1	A brief tornado caused minor structural damage and extensive tree damage.						
EF3	S of Elko to WSW of St. Matthews	Barnwell, Orangeburg, Calhoun	SC	33.3158°N 81.3944°W	09:43–10:20	35.68 mi (57.42 km)	770 yd (700 m)
EF3	2 deaths – A strong, long-tracked tornado caused severe damage along its path and passed near Livingston, heavily damaging or destroying multiple homes. One unanchored frame home was leveled, and several anchored double-wide manufactured homes were completely swept away and obliterated, with their frames thrown hundreds of yards. There were two fatalities in one of the homes. Numerous trees were snapped, denuded, and partially debarked along the path, many power poles were snapped, and a pivot irrigation system was flipped. Some outbuildings were destroyed as well. At least seven people were injured. This tornado was also notable in the fact that it absorbed the circulations of the two previous EF3 tornadoes near Livingston and Elko respectively.						
EF3	S of Blackville	Barnwell	SC	33.3177°N 81.2903°W	09:49–09:51	1.39 mi (2.24 km)	40 yd (37 m)
EF3	A small, brief, but strong tornado touched down at a farm and collapsed several chicken houses. After intensifying across an open field, the tornado struck and severely damaged a fiberglass coating facility. Large steel support beams in a 22,500 sq ft (2,090 m^{2}) warehouse at this location were twisted. Thirty cylindrical containers, each weighing 20,000–25,000 lb (9,100–11,300 kg), were lifted from their saddles and rolled through the building. Thereafter, the tornado quickly weakened and dissipated near SC 3.						
EF3	SE of Hilda	Barnwell	SC	33.2071°N 81.2742°W	09:50–09:55	5.37 mi (8.64 km)	800 yd (730 m)
EF3	A cinder-block garage had its metal roof peeled off and cinder blocks shifted about halfway up its wall. A well-built, bolted down metal building and a tin tractor shed were completely destroyed. A home had its roof lifted off, and a two-story wood-frame building behind it was shifted off its foundation and completely destroyed. A nearby unanchored log cabin was destroyed as well, and numerous trees were snapped or uprooted along the path.						
EF1	E of Blythewood	Richland	SC	34.1556°N 80.919°W	09:53–09:59	4.89 mi (7.87 km)	80 yd (73 m)
EF1	Numerous trees were snapped or uprooted. Several homes sustained minor shingle, soffit, and fascia damage.						
EF1	NE of Newington, GA	Screven (GA), Hampton (SC)	GA, SC	32.6516°N 81.487°W	09:58–10:06	5.9 mi (9.5 km)	200 yd (180 m)
EF1	Many trees were snapped or uprooted, some of which landed on structures. A mobile home had its roof ripped off, and a small cabin had a portion of its roof ripped off as well. This was the first of 12 tornadoes in a tornado family that traveled to Murrells Inlet, South Carolina.						
EF1	ESE of Harding to WNW of Gladys	Irwin	GA	31.5°N 83.32°W	10:01–10:04	1.92 mi (3.09 km)	50 yd (46 m)
EF1	A brief tornado snapped many trees.						
EF0	SE of Sycamore	Allendale	SC	33.0123°N 81.2167°W	10:04–10:09	5.85 mi (9.41 km)	300 yd (270 m)
EF0	A brief tornado caused sporadic tree damage.						
EF4	WNW of Scotia to NNE of Fechtig	Hampton	SC	32.7045°N 81.2899°W	10:10–10:37	23.73 mi (38.19 km)	1,300 yd (1,200 m)
EF4	5 deaths – See article on this tornado – A total of 60 people were injured. This was the second of 12 tornadoes in a tornado family that traveled from near Newington, Georgia to Murrells Inlet, South Carolina.						
EF2	NE of Rowesville	Orangeburg, Calhoun	SC	33.4032°N 80.787°W	10:25–10:37	10.23 mi (16.46 km)	700 yd (640 m)
EF2	A tractor dealership had its front windows blown out and the overhead doors blown in. Numerous trees were snapped or uprooted, several of which caused roof damage to buildings. Multiple pivot irrigation systems were overturned, power poles were snapped, and grain silos and outbuildings were damaged.						
EF1	SW of Saxapahaw	Alamance	NC	35.8943°N 79.3544°W	10:32–10:40	4.53 mi (7.29 km)	440 yd (400 m)
EF1	A high-end EF1 tornado caused considerable damage to buildings at a sawmill. Multiple homes sustained roof damage, and one home had its roof blown off entirely. Numerous sheds, garages, and outbuildings were destroyed, and many trees were snapped or uprooted along the path. Some of these trees landed on and damaged homes.						
EF2	NE of Morven	Anson	NC	34.8826°N 79.9797°W	10:34–10:35	0.19 mi (0.31 km)	75 yd (69 m)
EF2	A brief but strong tornado destroyed two chicken houses and knocked a mobile home off its foundation, rotating the structure 180° in the process.						
EF0	SE of Ambrose	Coffee	GA	31.55°N 82.96°W	10:39–10:41	1.18 mi (1.90 km)	125 yd (114 m)
EF0	A few mobile homes were heavily damaged, a truck was overturned onto its side, and trees and fences were downed.						
EF1	E of Morven	Anson	NC	34.8221°N 80.0284°W	10:45–10:50	8.82 mi (14.19 km)	200 yd (180 m)
EF1	A high-end EF1 tornado tracked through predominantly wooded areas, causing widespread tree damage. Many homes were damaged by the fallen trees, six or seven of which were destroyed. Outbuildings and vehicles were also damaged or destroyed.						
EF1	SE of Islandton	Colleton	SC	32.8359°N 80.8539°W	10:39–10:41	1.44 mi (2.32 km)	50 yd (46 m)
EF1	A couple dozen trees were snapped along the path. This was the third of 12 tornadoes in a tornado family that traveled from near Newington, Georgia to Murrells Inlet, South Carolina.						
EF1	WSW of Walterboro	Colleton	SC	32.8768°N 80.7459°W	10:46–10:50	3.14 mi (5.05 km)	100 yd (91 m)
EF1	Hundreds of trees were snapped or uprooted, and a tractor trailer was overturned. A tornado emergency was issued for this storm, which had produced an EF4 tornado just minutes earlier. This was the fourth of 12 tornadoes in a tornado family that traveled from near Newington, Georgia to Murrells Inlet, South Carolina.						
EF1	Walterboro to WSW of Norman Landing	Colleton	SC	32.8791°N 80.7305°W	10:47–11:00	17.33 mi (27.89 km)	500 yd (460 m)
EF1	1 death – Many hundreds of trees were snapped or uprooted by this high-end EF1 tornado. Hundreds of residences and some businesses in Walterboro were damaged by tornadic winds or fallen trees, including a large tree that fell onto a home, killing an occupant. At the Low Country Regional Airport, most hangars were destroyed and nearly two dozen aircraft were damaged or destroyed. One person was injured. A tornado emergency was issued for this storm, which had produced an EF4 tornado just minutes earlier. This was the fifth of 12 tornadoes in a tornado family that traveled from near Newington, Georgia to Murrells Inlet, South Carolina.						
EF1	NW of Givhans	Dorchester	SC	33.0211°N 80.3667°W	11:10–11:14	2.29 mi (3.69 km)	100 yd (91 m)
EF1	Many trees were snapped or uprooted, and a two-ton wood crate container was lifted and overturned. This was the sixth of 12 tornadoes in a tornado family that traveled from near Newington, Georgia to Murrells Inlet, South Carolina.						
EF1	Odum	Wayne	GA	31.67°N 82.03°W	11:25–11:30	4.75 mi (7.64 km)	440 yd (400 m)
EF1	A high-end EF1 tornado touched down in Odum, where trees were snapped, multiple homes sustained roof damage, and one small home was shifted off its foundation and heavily damaged. Outside of town, additional trees were snapped, a detached garage was severely damaged, and a house sustained broken windows and shingle damage. Eight people were injured.						
EF1	WSW of Ludowici	Long	GA	31.6923°N 81.8373°W	11:37–11:43	3.2 mi (5.1 km)	500 yd (460 m)
EF1	A tornado was identified by high-resolution satellite imagery over the Griffin Ridge Wildlife Management Area. Trees were snapped and uprooted.						
EF3	Eastern Moncks Corner	Berkeley	SC	33.1816°N 79.9901°W	11:38–11:48	5.74 mi (9.24 km)	400 yd (370 m)
EF3	A strong tornado touched down in a subdivision at the east edge Moncks Corner, where a large two-story home had its entire second floor destroyed, and sustained collapse of a few first-floor exterior walls. Significant damage to several other homes, trailers, and vehicles also occurred in this area. The tornado continued to the east of town, completely destroying a mobile home and heavily damaging a few frame homes. Multiple other homes sustained minor to moderate damage, and numerous trees were snapped or uprooted. Six people were injured. This was the seventh of 12 tornadoes in a tornado family that traveled from near Newington, Georgia to Murrells Inlet, South Carolina.						
EF0	E of Ludowici	Long	GA	31.6877°N 81.6861°W	11:47–11:48	0.36 mi (0.58 km)	100 yd (91 m)
EF0	A few trees were downed, and two barns and a mobile home were damaged.						
EF0	Bethera	Berkeley	SC	33.1941°N 79.794°W	11:51–11:52	0.93 mi (1.50 km)	200 yd (180 m)
EF0	Multiple trees were snapped and uprooted while a tree limb was blown onto the roof of a house by this high-end EF0 tornado. This was the eighth of 12 tornadoes in a tornado family that traveled from near Newington, Georgia to Murrells Inlet, South Carolina.						
EF1	SE of Jamestown	Berkeley	SC	33.2532°N 79.6559°W	12:00–12:02	2.5 mi (4.0 km)	400 yd (370 m)
EF1	Many trees were snapped or uprooted, and one home sustained roof damage. This was the ninth of 12 tornadoes in a tornado family that traveled from near Newington, Georgia to Murrells Inlet, South Carolina.						
EF1	SE of Whiteville	Columbus	NC	34.2306°N 78.6360°W	12:10–12:12	0.58 mi (0.93 km)	100 yd (91 m)
EF1	Extensive tree damage occurred, and several agricultural sheds were destroyed.						
EF1	N of Seabrook	Liberty, Bryan	GA	31.7592°N 81.3658°W	12:11–12:22	8.89 mi (14.31 km)	250 yd (230 m)
EF1	A few homes and a church sustained roof damage. Trees were snapped or uprooted along the path.						
EF1	SW of Sampit to Spring Gully	Georgetown	SC	33.3542°N 79.4727°W	12:13–12:19	4.76 mi (7.66 km)	40 yd (37 m)
EF1	Twin tornadoes developed with this one touching down first. It damaged a double-wide office trailer, a metal storage building, a few mobile homes, power lines, and trees in and around the community of Sampit. Some railroad crossing barriers were snapped as well. This was the 10th of 12 tornadoes in a tornado family that traveled from near Newington, Georgia to Murrells Inlet, South Carolina.						
EF1	Cumberland to N of Kensington	Georgetown	SC	33.3471°N 79.4494°W	12:15–12:27	11 mi (18 km)	50 yd (46 m)
EF1	Twin tornadoes developed with this one touching down second. It tracked across swampy terrain and damaged numerous trees. Near Graves two homes and several cars were damaged. A wooden carport and shed were destroyed, and some power poles were downed. This was the 11th of 12 tornadoes in a tornado family that traveled from near Newington, Georgia to Murrells Inlet, South Carolina.						
EF2	Edisto Beach	Colleton	SC	32.4852°N 80.343°W	12:15–12:16	1.16 mi (1.87 km)	140 yd (130 m)
EF2	A strong waterspout moved onshore at Edisto Island and caused extensive roof damage to six homes in Edisto Beach. One home had most of its roof removed and an outer wall collapsed. Power lines were knocked down, a boat and several vehicles were damaged, and a trailer was flipped over as well. Numerous trees were snapped or uprooted along the path.						
EF1	Seabrook Island	Charleston	SC	32.5653°N 80.1811°W	12:28–12:29	1.25 mi (2.01 km)	120 yd (110 m)
EF1	A short-lived tornado snapped or uprooted numerous trees. Several homes sustained varying degrees of damage from fallen trees.						
EF1	SW of Kiawah Island	Charleston	SC	32.5969°N 80.1134°W	12:33–12:34	0.3 mi (0.48 km)	60 yd (55 m)
EF1	Several large trees were snapped at a golf course.						
EF2	North Litchfield Beach to SE of Murrells Inlet	Georgetown	SC	33.4908°N 79.0906°W	12:36–12:47	4.56 mi (7.34 km)	50 yd (46 m)
EF2	A tornado caused extensive damage to trees along its path. At Huntington Beach State Park, one building suffered minor roof damage. As it moved offshore over the Atlantic Ocean southeast of Murrells Inlet, a Weather station observed winds of 114 mph (183 km/h), which was the basis for the low-end EF2 rating as the maximum damage on land was rated EF1 This was the last of the 12 tornadoes in a tornado family that started near Newington, Georgia.						
EF1	SE of Currie to S of Burgaw	Pender	NC	34.4017°N 78.0595°W	13:09–13:15	7.82 mi (12.59 km)	50 yd (46 m)
EF1	A tornado snapped numerous large trees and damaged or destroyed multiple outbuildings. Four power poles were snapped, a fire station building sustained minor damage, and a home adjacent to the fire station had its garage door blown in. Near the end of the path, a well-built, large metal outbuilding had its roof ripped off and thrown 50 yd (46 m).						
EF1	WNW of Rocky Point	Pender	NC	34.4315°N 77.9833°W	13:13–13:23	2.82 mi (4.54 km)	50 yd (46 m)
EF1	A power pole and several large trees were snapped. A few homes sustained minor roof damage as well.						
EF1	E of St. Helena	Pender	NC	34.5009°N 77.8675°W	13:19–13:30	2.84 mi (4.57 km)	30 yd (27 m)
EF1	Several trees were snapped. A large shed was destroyed, and the front porch of a home was uplifted.						
EF0	S of Maple Hill	Pender	NC	34.5543°N 77.7547°W	13:24–13:30	1.49 mi (2.40 km)	30 yd (27 m)
EF0	A few small trees were snapped, and some tree limbs were broken as well.						
EF0	Oak Island	Brunswick	NC	33.9145°N 78.1659°W	13:32–13:34	0.08 mi (0.13 km)	15 yd (14 m)
EF0	A waterspout moved onshore over Oak Island and caused minor damage to roofs, siding, and trees.						
EF0	N of Yaupon Beach	Brunswick	NC	33.9053°N 78.0799°W	13:36–13:38	0.42 mi (0.68 km)	15 yd (14 m)
EF0	Several trees were snapped or twisted and a fence was toppled.						
EF1	Haws Run	Onslow	NC	34.6835°N 77.5726°W	13:36–13:41	5.5 mi (8.9 km)	640 yd (590 m)
EF1	An intermittent high-end EF1 tornado touched down in the Haws Run community and snapped, uprooted, and twisted numerous mature trees. Hog houses were completely destroyed, with many sections of the metal roofing and insulation thrown several miles away from the farm.						
EF0	Maysville	Jones	NC	34.904°N 77.2378°W	14:01–14:02	0.7 mi (1.1 km)	75 yd (69 m)
EF0	A brief tornado caused predominantly minor damage to trees in town, though a few large trees were downed.						
EF0	E of Roper	Washington	NC	35.8866°N 76.5537°W	14:05–14:06	0.35 mi (0.56 km)	25 yd (23 m)
EF0	A brief tornado destroyed a metal hog farm structure, lofting debris up to 0.4 mi (0.64 km) away.						
EF0	SE of Pollocksville	Jones	NC	34.9586°N 77.1532°W	14:08–14:09	0.08 mi (0.13 km)	60 yd (55 m)
EF0	A brief tornado snapped 10–15 trees.						
EF0	Northern Live Oak	Suwannee	FL	30.31°N 83.01°W	14:09–14:13	3.06 mi (4.92 km)	175 yd (160 m)
EF0	A weak tornado moved through the north side of Live Oak, downing trees and tree limbs and damaging a few metal buildings. A Walmart sustained minor damage at the end of the path.						
EF0	Bayview	Beaufort	NC	35.4346°N 76.7884°W	14:15–14:16	0.31 mi (0.50 km)	29 yd (27 m)
EF0	A waterspout moved onshore from the Pamlico River into Bayview, damaging a pier in the process. Several trees were snapped or uprooted, with one home sustained some damage from flying debris.						
EF0	Havelock	Craven	NC	34.8988°N 76.9273°W	14:20–14:21	0.27 mi (0.43 km)	75 yd (69 m)
EF0	A brief tornado caused minor roof and carport damage to several homes in town, and damaged fences and trees.						
EF1	Frizzellburg	Carroll	MD	39.6087°N 77.0850°W	17:47–17:48	0.38 mi (0.61 km)	75 yd (69 m)
EF1	A brief tornado caused minor roofing damage to homes in Frizzellburg, shifted a garage, and tossed an RV a few feet. Several trees were snapped or uprooted as well.						
EF0	Baltimore Corner to Henderson	Caroline	MD	39.0642°N 75.8548°W	19:27–19:28	4.85 mi (7.81 km)	30 yd (27 m)
EF0	Numerous trees were snapped or uprooted along a sporadic path.						

== See also ==
- Tornadoes of 2020
- List of United States tornadoes in April 2020
- List of tornadoes and tornado outbreaks
