= National Weather Service Shreveport, Louisiana =

National Weather Service forecast office

- Types: branch
- Location: Shreveport
- Country: United States
- Coordinates: 32°27′04″N 93°50′30″W
- Parent organisations: National Weather Service
- Website: www.weather.gov/shv/

National Weather Service - Shreveport, LA (SHV) is one of 122 weather forecast offices of the National Weather Service around the United States. It is responsible for issuing public and aviation forecasts and warning for South Central and Southwestern Arkansas, Southeastern Oklahoma, and Eastern and Northeastern Texas Counties, as well as for North Central and Northwestern Louisiana Parishes. It is co-located with a weather radar (KSHV) of the NEXRAD network and an upper air sounding facility. It controls the issuance of weather information and bulletins on a certain number of NOAA Weather Radio.

== Mission ==
The mission of the Shreveport office is analyse meteorological data from weather stations, weather radar and satellite, and numerical weather predictions to issue forecast and warnings for forty-eight counties and parishes, centered around Shreveport, Louisiana. This includes 1 county in extreme Southeast Oklahoma, 9 counties in Southwest and Southern Arkansas, 21 counties in East Texas, and 17 parishes in Northwest and North Central Louisiana.

These forecasts are for general public, aviation and fire weather control. The aviation forecasts, are issued every 6 hours for 7 airports in the Shreveport coverage zone, including Shreveport Regional Airport. Fire weather forecasts are produced for fire officials and firefighting efforts. Watches, warnings, and advisories for severe thunderstorm and tornado watches are issued by the Storm Prediction Center (SPC), in Norman, OK, but are coordinated with the SHV office. All other watches and all warnings and advisories are issued by the local office in Shreveport.

== Tools ==
The current office is co-located and maintain a Doppler weather radar and an upper air sounding facility. The latter is launching weather balloons to measure the atmospheric temperature, winds and humidity up to 100 thousand feet above ground twice daily at 00 and 12 UTC. During high-impact events, such as impending severe weather, winter weather, or when a hurricane is approaching the United States, balloon launches may occur more frequent. Data from the balloon launches are plotted on Skew-T log-P diagrams.

The meteorologists use the Advanced Weather Interactive Processing System (AWIPS) to monitor the weather situation and issue forecasts.

== NOAA weather radio stations ==
Forecasts, observations, watches, warnings, and advisories are transmitted through a number of NOAA All Hazards Radio transmitters 24 hours a day:

Callsign	Cities	Frequency	Region
WXJ65	Broken Bow, OK	162.450 MHz	McCurtain County
WNG650	Center, TX	162.525 MHz	Shelby County
KWN32	Gilmer, TX	162.425 MHz	Upshur County
WXK23	Lufkin, TX	162.550 MHz	Lufkin-Nacogdoches
WXJ96	Monroe, LA	162.550 MHz	Monroe-Ruston
WNG725	El Dorado, AR	162.525 MHz	El Dorado
WXN87	Natchitoches, LA	162.500 MHz	Southeast Ark-La-Tex
WXJ97	Shreveport, LA	162.400 MHz	Ark-La-Tex
WXJ49	Texarkana, TX	162.550 MHz	Texarkana metropolitan area
WXK36	Tyler, TX	162.475 MHz	East Texas
WNG653	Marietta, TX	162.525 MHz	Atlanta-Linden
