= George Wells Ladd =

American economist

George Wells Ladd (April 28, 1925 – May 22, 2016) was an American economist.

George Wells Ladd was born to parents Leonard L. Ladd and Helen Johnston Ladd on April 28, 1925. He was raised on the family farm near Brookings, South Dakota, until the family moved to Mitchell in 1933. After his mother died there, he moved again in 1936 to Huron, and graduated from Huron High School. Following high school graduation, he served in the United States Marine Corps between 1943 and 1946, then began attending South Dakota State College. He completed his undergraduate degree in 1950, then obtained a master of arts degree in economics from the University of Michigan in 1951, followed by a doctoral degree in economics from the University of Illinois Urbana-Champaign in 1955.

Ladd's teaching career at Iowa State University spanned from 1955 to 1992, where he was appointed Charles F. Curtiss Distinguished Professor in Agriculture. He was elected a fellow of the American Agricultural Economics Association in 1987. He died in Ames, Iowa, on May 22, 2016, aged 91.
