= 2023 Virginia Beach tornado =

2023 tornado in Virginia, U.S.

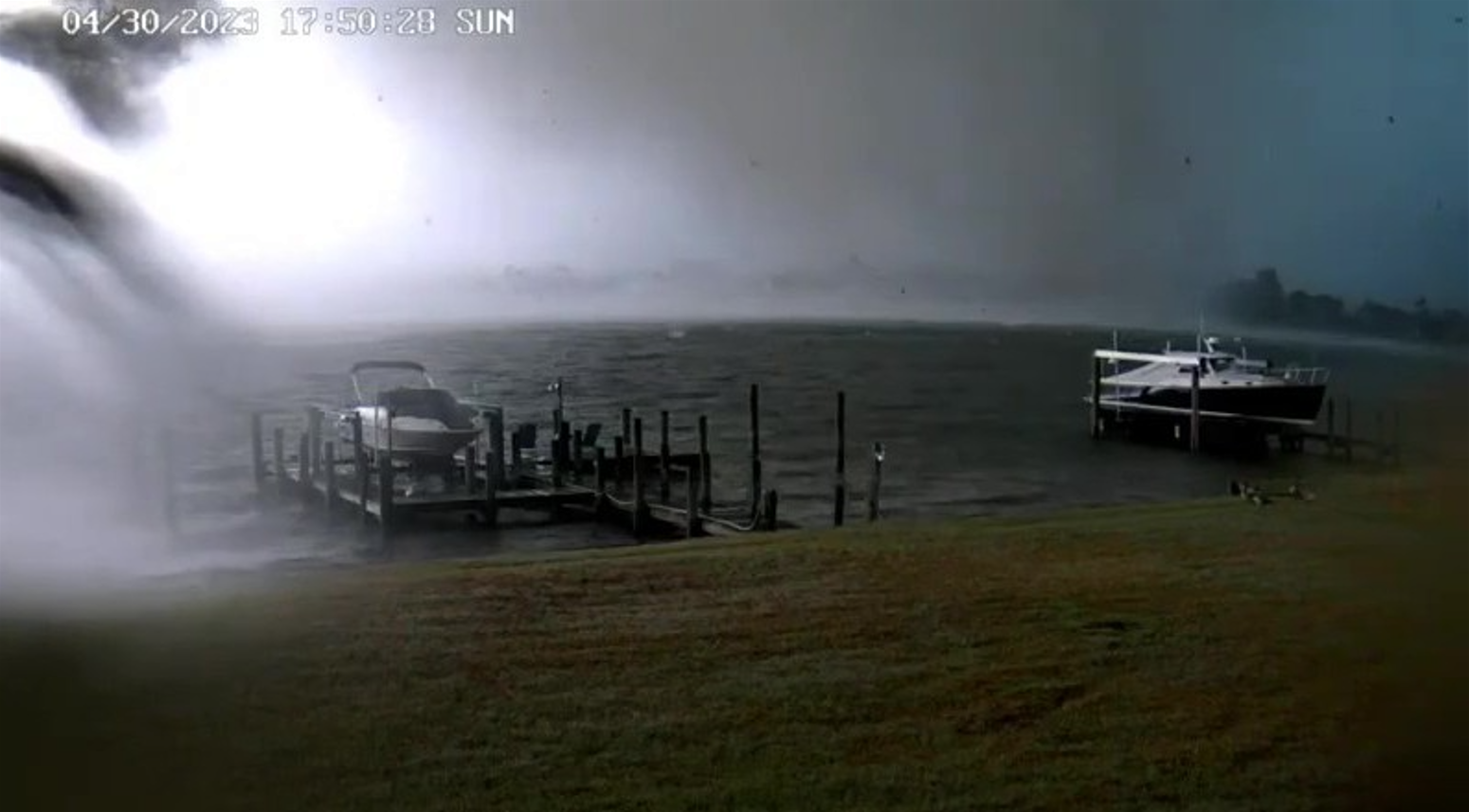
- The EF3 tornado, seen via security cam in Virginia Beach.

Meteorological history
- Formed: April 30, 2023, 5:48 pm EST (UTC−05:00)
- Dissipated: April 30, 2023, 5:53 pm EST (UTC−05:00)
- Duration: 6 minutes

EF3 tornado
- on the Enhanced Fujita scale
- Max width: 350 yards (0.20 mi; 0.32 km)
- Path length: 4.5 miles (7.2 km)
- Highest winds: 145 mph (233 km/h)

Overall effects
- Casualties: None
- Damage: $15 million (2023 USD)
- Part of the Tornadoes of 2023

In the evening hours of April 30, 2023, a rare and intense tornado struck portions of Virginia Beach, the largest city in the state of Virginia. The tornado inflicted heavy damage to dozens of homes, with wind speeds in the vortex reaching as high as 145 miles per hour (233 km/h). Despite heavy damage, no casualties were recorded. The tornado prompted the closure of three schools in the area; Virginia Beach was put under a local state of emergency. Damage costs from the tornado totaled an estimated $15 million (2023 USD).

The tornado touched down in a residential area on the northern side of Virginia Beach, initially causing minor damage along River Road and before it entered the Broad Bay Estates residential subdivision and intensified. The tornado reached its peak intensity as it moved through the neighborhood, inflicting major structural damage to multiple large and well-built homes. The tornado then weakened again before it impacted the Joint Expeditionary Base Fort Story, and it then dissipated shortly after.

== Advanced forecasting ==
On April 28, the Storm Prediction Center (SPC) outlined a "marginal", level 1-out-of-5 risk for severe weather in its Day 3 convective outlook. The risk area covered much of the East Coast of the United States, including the Tidewater region. The text product issued in conjunction with the marginal risk noted that "strong to locally severe thunderstorms will be possible Sunday across the eastern Carolinas into the Tidewater Region, and also across parts of Florida". The Day 2 convective outlook, issued a day later on April 29, saw a "slight", level 2-out-of-5 risk was outlined in the same area. In addition to a slight risk area outlined for the Tidewater region, another slight risk area was outlined by the SPC for much of South Florida. A 5% chance of tornadoes was outlined for both slight risk areas, in addition to a 15% chance of damaging wind and 5% chance of damaging hail.

== Tornado summary ==
EF2 damage to trees at a property along Upper Chelsea Reach.

The tornado first touched down in a residential area of Virginia Beach at 5:48 pm EST, immediately snapping tree trunks on River Court at EF1 intensity before tracking northeast through properties on River Road, snapping and uprooting numerous additional trees at EF1 strength. It then impacted a section of Broad Bay Estates Park before entering the Broad Bay Estates housing subdivision. Additional EF1 intensity damage occurred in the subdivision along River Road, Runners Way, and Falcon Crescent as trees were snapped and houses suffered some damage to their roofs and exteriors. The tornado then rapidly intensified as it tracked along Upper Chelsea Reach, inflicting EF2-rated damage as many large trees were snapped, some of which fell onto houses and caused heavy structural damage. EF2 damage continued along Haversham Close, where one house had major roof damage. As the tornado reached a bend in the road, it attained its maximum intensity and began producing EF3 damage to homes along the road.

Track and intensity map of the tornado through Haversham Close. Key EF0 65–85 mph EF1 86–110 mph EF2 111–135 mph EF3 136–165 mph ⎯ Center of the tornado

At this point the tornado was producing winds estimated 145 miles per hour (233 km/h). Multiple large and very well-built homes in this area had roofs torn off, many of which also had some exterior walls collapsed or ripped off. One of the houses was partially shifted off of its foundation by the tornado, and a few other homes farther from the center of damage path were heavily damaged at EF2 intensity. The strong tornado then exited the subdivision and moved northeast over the water, becoming a waterspout over the Broad Bay. It then began to weaken as it moved onshore on the opposite side of the bay and inflicted EF1-rated damage to trees and homes on Windward Shore Drive. The tornado then tracked through the swamp located on the grounds of the First Landing State Park, before entering the Joint Expeditionary Base Fort Story. EF1 damage was inflicted to trees and at least one low-rise building; and at this point the tornado was continuing to weaken in intensity.

The tornado crossed Atlantic Avenue and inflicted EF0 damage to a residence before lifting over Leyte Street and Leyte Circle at 5:54 pm EST. It was on the ground for 4.52 miles (7.27 km).

== Aftermath ==
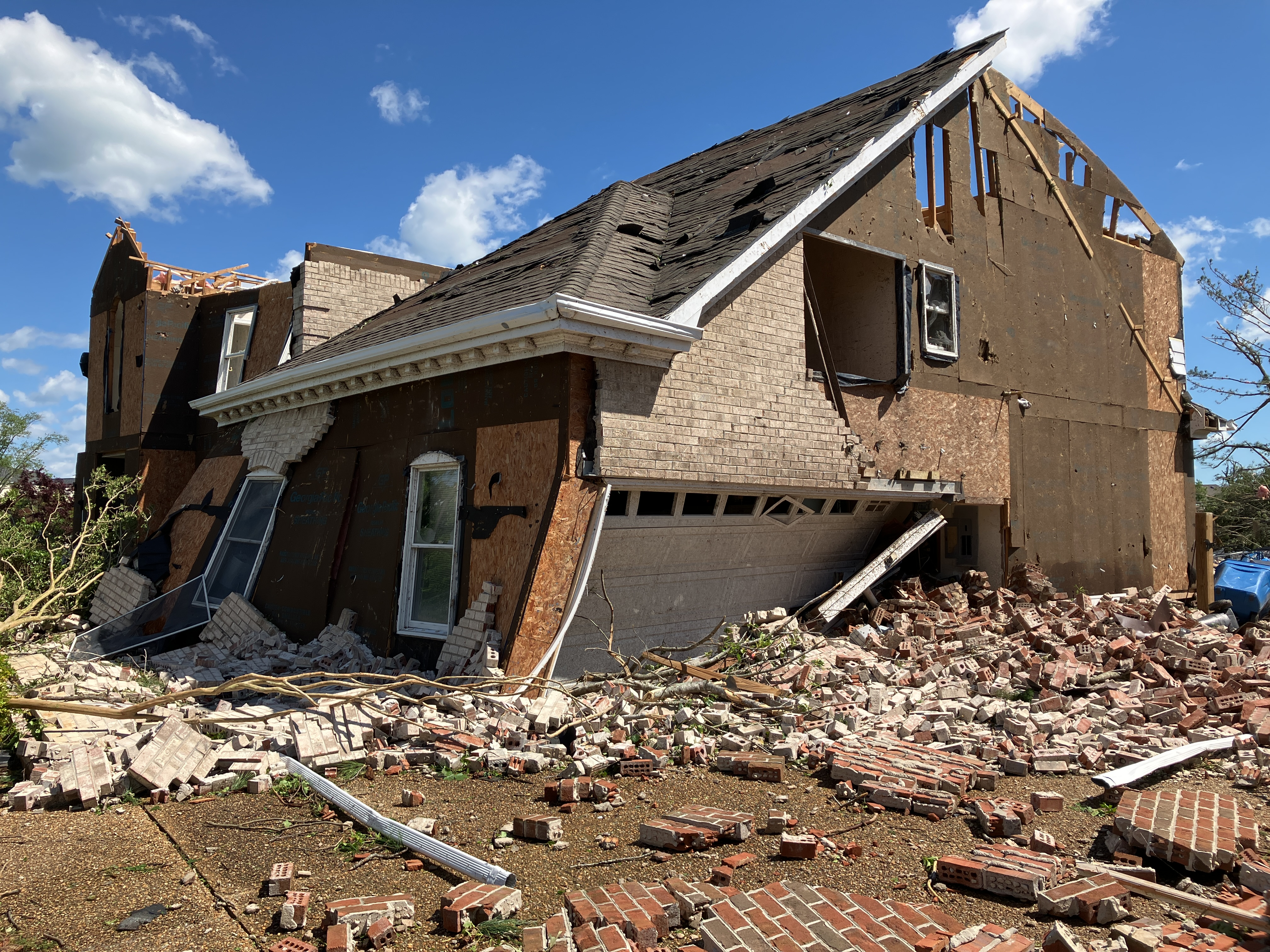
Low-end EF3 damage to a well-built home along Haversham Close in Virginia Beach.

Up to 100 homes were damaged by the tornado, which prompted the closure of three schools, the Frank W. Cox High School, the Great Neck Middle School and the John B. Dey Elementary School. A state of emergency was put in place for Virginia Beach; work crews from Dominion Energy and Virginia Natural Gas responded to the tornado damage. The tornado was the strongest and largest to ever hit Virginia Beach, receiving an EF3 rating on the Enhanced Fujita scale. Due to its strength, ABC News and The Daily Progress described the tornado as "rare". It was the first EF3 tornado to hit Virginia since 2019, and one of the most powerful to ever hit within the city limits of Virginia Beach.

Despite heavy damage to homes and other structures, no serious injuries or fatalities were recorded. Monetary damage estimates from the tornado totaled $15 million (2023 USD). Damage from Joint Expeditionary Base Fort Story alone totaled $3 million (2023 USD). On base, 56 soldiers were displaced. The Great Neck Recreation Center was utilized as a post-tornado shelter for residents of Virginia Beach immediately following the event.

In an April 2024 publication of The Virginian-Pilot, it was noted that the recovery efforts were "textbook examples of a successful emergency response".

== See also ==
- List of United States tornadoes from April to May 2023
