= 2022 Russia–Ukraine tornado outbreak =

2022 Tornado outbreak in Russia and Ukraine

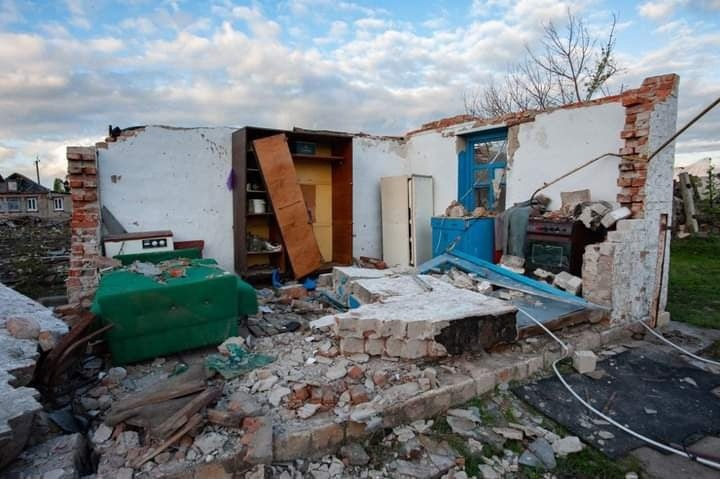
- Damage in Buryn, Sumy Oblast, Ukraine from a F3 tornado on 18 September 2022.

Meteorological history
- Duration: 18–19 September 2022

Tornado outbreak
- Tornadoes: 8+
- Max. rating: F3 tornado

Overall effects
- Fatalities: 3
- Injuries: 8
- Damage: Unknown
- Areas affected: Eastern Ukraine, Western and Central Russia
- Part of the tornado outbreaks of 2022

On 18 September 2022, a small but significant and fatal tornado outbreak began in Eastern Ukraine and moved into Russia, producing at least 8 tornadoes, including an intense F3 tornado and three possible, unconfirmed tornadoes. On 19 September, a significant tornado occurred in Russia, with another possible, unconfirmed tornado and severe straight-line thunderstorm wind damage. Through the event, 3 people were killed and at least 8 others were injured.

The tornadoes occurred in the midst of the Russian invasion of Ukraine.

== Meteorological history ==
On September 18, thunderstorms developed over northwest Ukraine. The environment the storms began to move into had strong low-level wind shear, which is needed for severe wind gusts and tornadoes. On September 19, Tomas Pucik, a researcher for the European Severe Storms Laboratory, noted the environment on the 18th was “very conductive” for tornadoes.

== Tornadoes ==
On September 18, 2022, the tornado outbreak moved from eastern Ukraine into southwestern Russia, where radar and visual evidence showed at least two short-lived tornadoes in Kursk Oblast. These happened in weak atmospheric conditions, with lower energy for storms (CAPE) than in Ukraine, around 500–1000 J/kg, which kept storms small and made their paths short, about 1–3 km.

A second tornado, also confirmed by ground-level observations in the southwestern Kursk region, lasted less than 10 minutes and caused small areas of debris damage similar to EF0–EF1 on the Enhanced Fujita scale. Videos clearly showed steady spinning of the tornado and no sudden flashes or scattered debris patterns like those from artillery fire, making it different from wartime explosions because debris kept moving in the air and there was no heat shown in thermal images.

Confirmed tornadoes by Fujita rating
FU	F0	F1	F2	F3	F4	F5	Total
1	0	3	3	1	0	0	8+

List of confirmed tornadoes
F#/T#	Location	Oblast/Subregion	Country	Start Coord.	Time (UTC)	Path length	Max width	Summary
September 18
FU	Donskoye	Kaliningrad Oblast	Russia	Unknown	07:30 ± 30 min	Unknown	Unknown	A rope tornado was sighted and caught on video in the Donskoye area. No known damage occurred.
F3	Buryn'	Sumy Oblast	Ukraine	51.20°N 33.85°E	13:30 ± 15 min	15.6 km (9.7 mi)	250 m (270 yd)	1 death — The tornado caused significant damage to the city of Buryn, where many homes and apartment buildings sustained major structural damage. Many residential buildings had their roofs torn off, and several had destroyed exterior walls. One fatality occurred when a wall fell onto a person. Many trees were snapped and stripped of limbs, cars were tossed, and metal pylons were toppled along a set of railroad tracks. A gas station was also damaged, and debris was scattered throughout the damage path. About 10,000 customers were left without electricity, and eight injuries occurred from this tornado. The European Severe Storms Laboratory initially rated this tornado F2, though it was upgraded to F3 on September 21, based on severe structural damage to well-built brick buildings.
F2	Zinove	Sumy Oblast	Ukraine	Unknown	13:45 ± 30 min	Unknown	Unknown	Homes and other buildings were damaged, some of which had roofs torn off. Numerous large trees were snapped or uprooted in wooded areas, and large power line pylons were bent.
F1	Shurovе	Sumy Oblast	Ukraine	51.23°N 33.98°E	13:45 ± 30 min	Unknown	Unknown	The tornado damaged or destroyed power and telecommunication lines. Homes sustained major damage to their roofs, and many trees were snapped or uprooted.
F1	Ol'govka	Kursk Oblast	Russia	51.40°N 35.02°E	15:05 ± 15 min	Unknown	Unknown	A high-end F1 tornado caused major damage to structures in the village of Ol'govka. Numerous residential buildings were damaged.
F2/T5	L'gov, Prigorodnaya Slobodka	Kursk Oblast	Russia	51.69°N 35.30°E	15:30 ± 30 min	Unknown	Unknown	Over 200 structures were damaged or destroyed as a result of this strong wedge tornado. Many residential structures had roofs torn off, and some sustained collapse of their exterior walls. Numerous trees were downed, and high-voltage power lines were also damaged or destroyed.
F1	Kursk	Kursk Oblast	Russia	51.67°N 36.08°E	17:00 ± 30 min	Unknown	Unknown	2 deaths — This high-end F1 tornado impacted an automotive technical college in the city, causing significant damage as the roof of a dormitory building was torn off. Other buildings suffered roof damage, cars were damaged by flying debris and falling trees, and streets were left strewn with debris. A student was killed after being struck in the abdomen by a piece of roof, which entered through a nearby window. The student was reportedly filming the tornado during that time. Another victim was found under a downed tree near the college.
September 19
F2	Svecha	Kirov Oblast	Russia	58.28°N 47.33°E	14:20 ± 15 min	Unknown	200 m (220 yd)	A strong tornado occurred in a forest, flattening a swath of trees. Large branches were broken, large trees were snapped or uprooted, and roads were left closed and impassible.

=== Possible tornadoes ===
Around 13:00 ± 30 minutes UTC on September 18, severe wind damage occurred in the town of Sulimy and minutes later in the town of Konovaly, Ukraine. Power lines were damaged or destroyed, the roofs of 25 homes were damaged or destroyed, and trees sustained damage or were snapped or uprooted. The European Severe Storms Laboratory (ESSL) noted these events may have been tornadoes. As such, both were given a rating of F1 on the Fujita scale. However, a tornado was not confirmed in either event.

Just over an hour later, around 14:20 ± 30 minutes UTC, at least 13 households (6 in particular) were damaged in Tyazhino, Kursk, Russia after the passage of a thunderstorm. The structures suffered mostly damage to roofs with a few roofs being completely destroyed. The European Severe Storms Laboratory noted this event may have been a tornado. As such, it was given a rating of at least F1/T3, however a tornado was not confirmed with this event.

Around 15:15 ± 5 minutes UTC on September 19, wind damage to roofs in particular, was reported in Khokhlovshchina, Kirov, Russia, after the passage of a thunderstorm. The European Severe Storms Laboratory noted this event may have been a tornado. As such, ESSL gave a rating of F1 to the damage, however, a tornado was not confirmed with this event.

== See also ==
- Weather of 2022
- Tornadoes of 2022
- 1984 Soviet Union tornado outbreak
- 2009 Krasnozavodsk tornado
- 1904 Moscow tornado
- List of European tornadoes and tornado outbreaks
