= George Ladd (silversmith) =

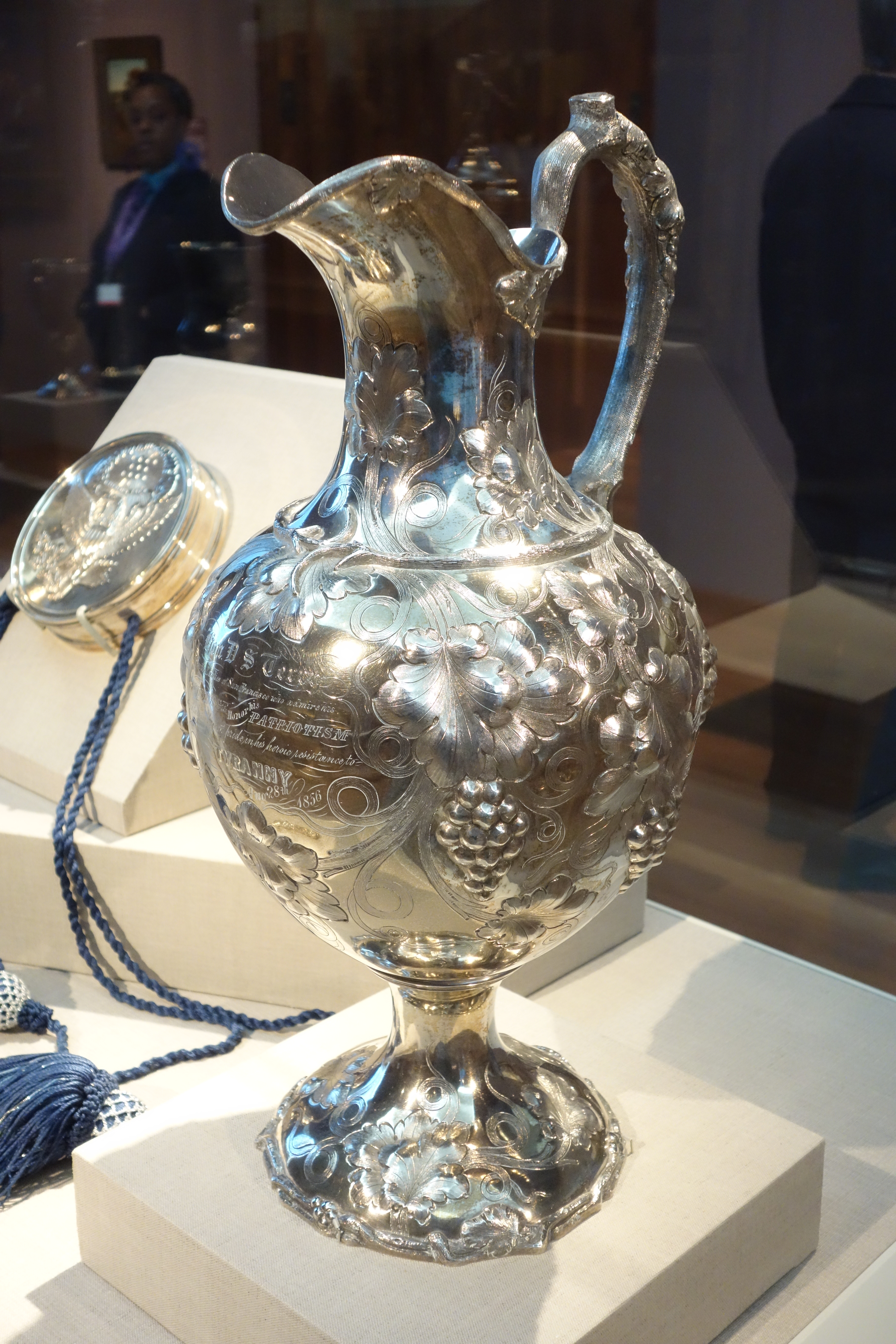
Ewer by George Ladd, 1859

George Ladd was an American silversmith, active in New York City from 1846 to 1851 and San Francisco, California from 1856 to 1861.
