= George Ladd (Medal of Honor) =

American Civil War Medal of Honor recipient

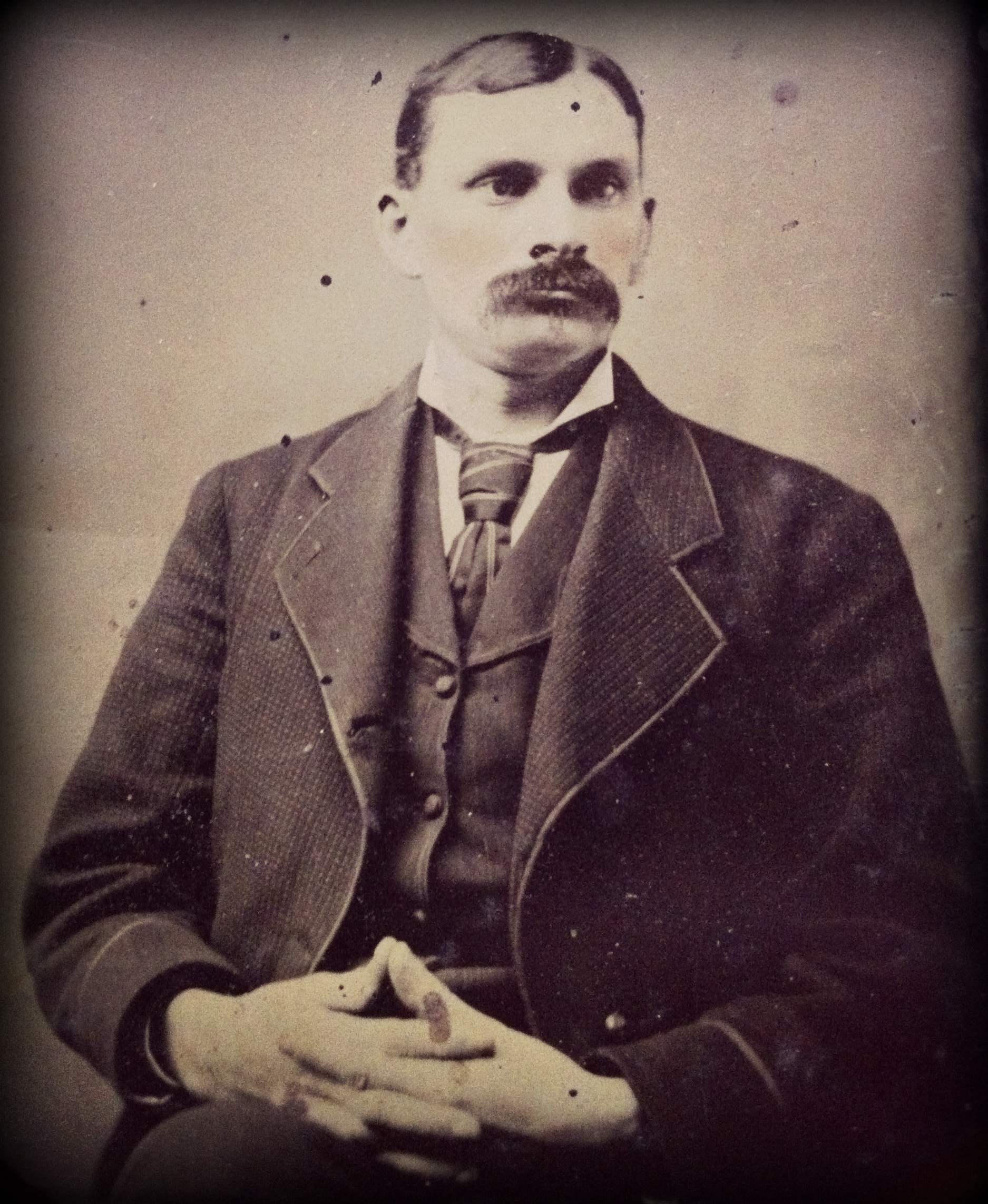
- George Ladd, Civil War Medal of Honor Recipient
- Born: 1829; Camillus, New York, US
- Died: August 13, 1869
- Military career
- Allegiance: United States; Union
- Branch: United States Army; Union Army
- Service years: 1864–1865
- Rank: Private
- Units: (New York (state)) Company H, 22nd New York Volunteer Cavalry Regiment
- Conflicts: American Civil War
- Awards: Medal of Honor

George Ladd (1828 or 1829 – August 13, 1889) was a private in the Union Army and a Medal of Honor recipient for his role in the American Civil War.

At the age of 35, Ladd enlisted in the Army from Camillus, New York in January 1864. He mustered out with his regiment in August 1865.

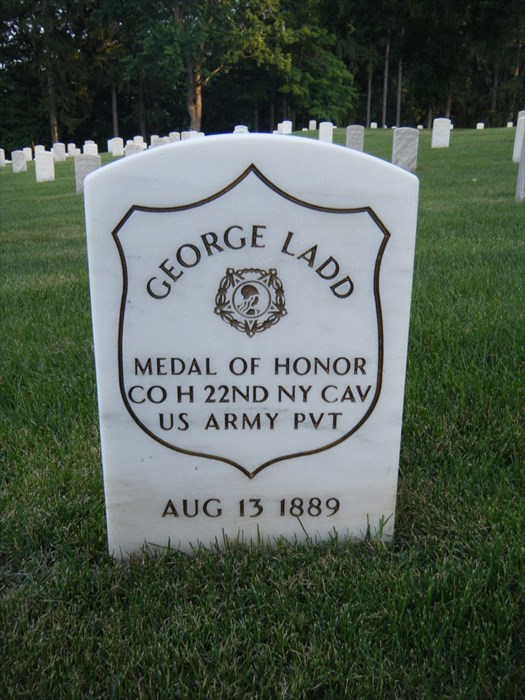
George Ladd is buried in Bath National Cemetery, Steuben County, New York. Plot: Section C, Row 6, Grave 6

== Medal of Honor citation ==
Rank and organization: Private, Company H, 22d New York Cavalry. Place and date: At Waynesboro, Va., March 2, 1865. Entered service at: Carmillus, Onondaga County, N.Y. Birth: Carmillus, N.Y. Date of issue: March 26, 1865.

Citation:

Captured a standard bearer, his flag, horse and equipment.

== See also ==
- List of Medal of Honor recipients
- List of American Civil War Medal of Honor recipients: G–L
