= Land assembly district =

Real estate term

A Land Assembly District (LAD) is a district of property owners that has the power, by majority vote, to approve or disapprove the sale of their land.

It is a proposed legal regime to solve the problem of gridlock, which happens when too many people own the rights to parcels of land that need to be assembled in order to begin a larger construction project. When small parcels of land are owned by many different people and an efficient use of the land requires assembling them into a bigger piece, American law only provides two methods: voluntary assembly, where each parcel must be purchased separately (leading to a holdout problem), and eminent domain which is often quite controversial and only pays the "fair market value", which does not take into account the owners' subjective or emotional valuation of land.

Under the LAD regime, states can authorize neighborhoods to create LADs. In a LAD, the neighbors can elect a board to negotiate a price for the sale of the entire area, which would then be split among the owners pro rata. Anyone who dissents and refuses to sell their land, can still have it seized by eminent domain. Alternatively, a certain number (perhaps 50% or 66%), of owners must vote to approve the sale, or shares are apportioned among owners based on the size of their interests.
