= Ladds, Georgia =

- Unincorporated community
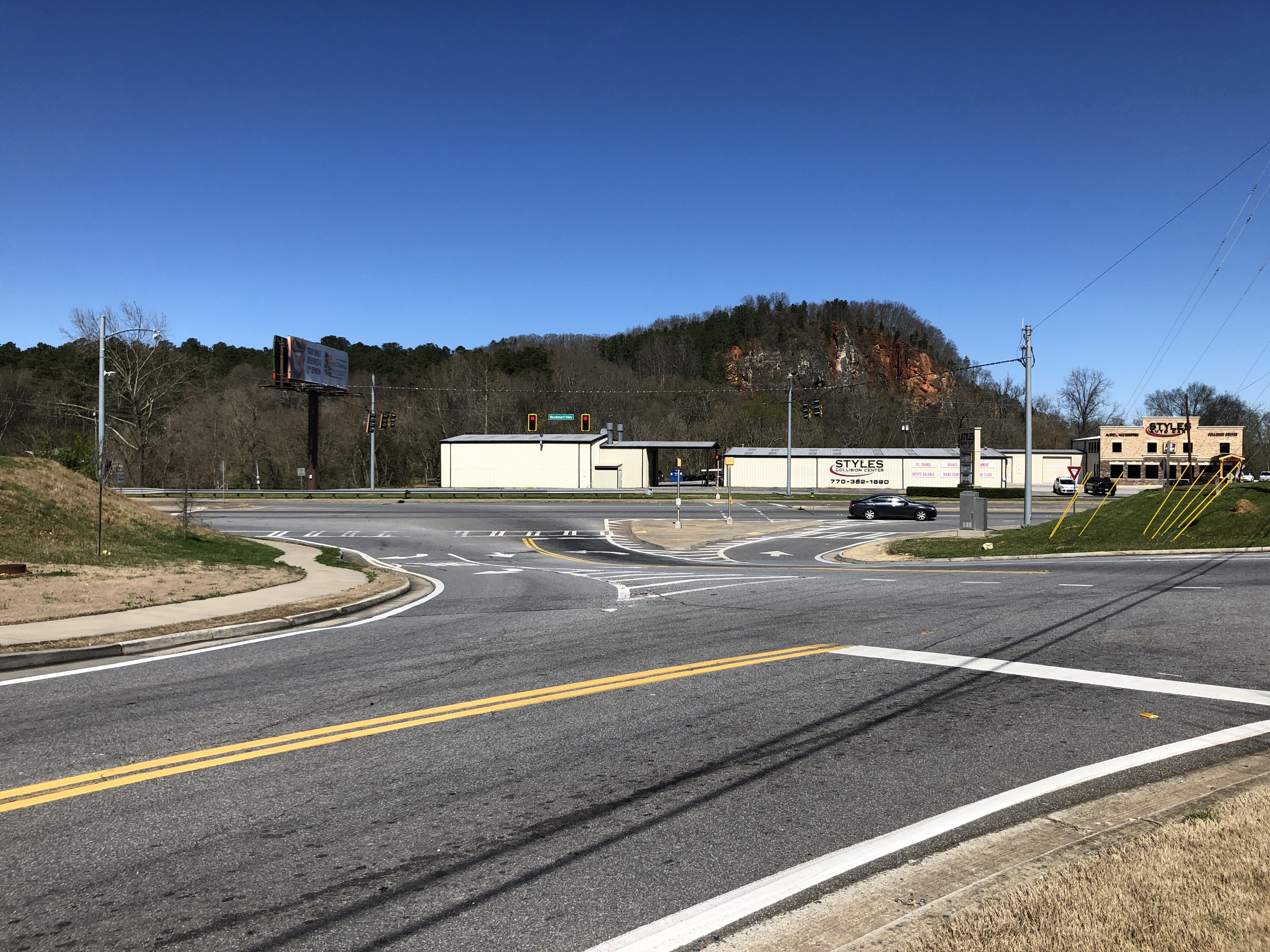
- An intersection in Ladds, with Quarry Mountain in the background

- Location within the state of Georgia Ladds, Georgia (the United States)
- Coordinates: 34°08′55″N 84°49′46″W
- Country: United States
- State: Georgia
- County: Bartow
- Elevation: 909 ft (277 m)
- Time zone: UTC-5 (Eastern (EST))
  - Summer (DST): UTC-4 (EDT)
- Area codes: 770, 678 & 470
- GNIS ID: 30120

Ladds is an unincorporated community in Bartow County, in the U.S. state of Georgia.

== History ==
The community took its name from Alonzo Ladd, proprietor of the local A. C. Ladd Lime Company.
