= List of places in Arkansas: S =

Arkansas State Seal

This list of current cities, towns, unincorporated communities, and other recognized places in the U.S. state of Arkansas whose name begins with the letter S. It also includes information on the number and names of counties in which the place lies, and its lower and upper zip code bounds, if applicable.

== Cities and towns ==
Principal county	Lower zip code	Upper zip code		
Sacred Heart	1	Johnson County	72840	
Saddle	1	Fulton County	72554	
Saffell	1	Lawrence County	72572	
Sage	1	Izard County	72573	
Saginaw	1	Hot Spring County	71941	
St. Charles	1	Arkansas County	72140	
St. Claire	1	Crittenden County		
St. Francis	1	Clay County	72464	
St. James	1	Stone County	72560	
St. Joe	1	Searcy County	72675	
St. Paul	1	Madison County	72760	
St. Thomas	1	Mississippi County		
St. Vincent	1	Conway County	72063	
Salado	1	Independence County	72575	
Salem	1	Fulton County	72576	
Salem	1	Ouachita County		
Salem	1	Pike County	71943	
Salem	1	Saline County	72576	
Salesville	1	Baxter County	72653	
Saline	1	Cleveland County	71652	
Saltillo	1	Faulkner County	72032	
Salus	1	Johnson County	72854	
Samples	1	Jefferson County		
Sanders	1	Nevada County		
Sand Gap	1	Pope County		
Sand Hill	1	Hempstead County		
Sand Hill	1	Prairie County	72040	
Sandiff	1	Cleburne County		
Sand Ridge	1	Logan County		
Sandtown	1	Conway County	72110	
Sandtown	1	Independence County	72501	
Sandy	1	Craighead County		
Sandy Bend	1	Union County	71765	
Sandybend	1	Union County		
Sandy Land	1	Union County	71730	
Sandy Ridge	1	Mississippi County	72319	
Sans Souci	1	Mississippi County		
Santuck	1	Bradley County		
Saratoga	1	Howard County	71859	
Sardis	1	Saline County	72011	
Satuma	1	Perry County		
Saulsburg	1	Monroe County		
Savoy	1	Washington County	72701	
Sawmill	1	Union County		
Sayre	1	Ouachita County	71726	
Schaal	1	Howard County	71851	
Schaberg	1	Crawford County	72946	
Schug	1	Craighead County	72450	
Scipio	1	Drew County		
Scotia	1	Pope County		
Scotland	1	Van Buren County	72141	
Scott	2	Lonoke County	72142	
Scott	2	Pulaski County	72142	
Scottsville	1	Pope County	72862	
Scott Valley	1	Lee County		
Scranton	1	Logan County	72863	
Screeton	1	Prairie County	72064	
Searcy	1	White County	72143	
Seaton	1	Lonoke County	72046	
Seaton Dump	1	Lonoke County	72046	
Seba	1	Benton County		
Sedgwick	1	Lawrence County	72465	
Segur	1	Montgomery County		
Self	1	Boone County		
Sellers Store	1	Sharp County		
Selma	1	Drew County	71670	
Seyppel	1	Crittenden County	72348	
Shady	1	Polk County		
Shady Grove	1	Baxter County		
Shady Grove	1	Fulton County	72583	
Shady Grove	1	Johnson County	72830	
Shady Grove	1	Logan County		
Shady Grove	1	Mississippi County	72442	
Shady Grove	1	Nevada County	71857	
Shady Grove	1	Poinsett County	72472	
Shady Grove	1	Pulaski County	72205	
Shakertown	1	Clark County		
Shannon	1	Lincoln County	71644	
Shannon	1	Randolph County	72455	
Shannondale	1	St. Francis County	72348	
Shannon Hills	1	Saline County	72103	
Shannon Tank	1	Lincoln County		
Shannonville	1	Crittenden County		
Shark	1	Yell County		
Sharman	1	Columbia County	71860	
Sharp Ford	1	Benton County		
Sharum	1	Randolph County	72425	
Shaw	1	Saline County		
Shawmut	1	Pike County		
Shawnee	1	Mississippi County		
Shearerville	1	St. Francis County		
Shelbyville	1	Sharp County	72521	
Shell Lake	1	St. Francis County	72346	
Sheppard	1	Hempstead County	71838	
Sheppard Point	1	Arkansas County		
Sheridan	1	Grant County	72150	
Sherrill	1	Jefferson County	72152	
Sherry	1	Pulaski County		
Sherwood	1	Pulaski County	72116	
Sherwood Hills	1	Hot Spring County	72105	
Shibley	1	Crawford County		
Shiloh	1	Columbia County		
Shiloh	1	Howard County	71851	
Shiloh	1	Lafayette County	71827	
Shiloh	1	Pope County	72801	
Shipp	1	Baxter County		
Shippen	1	Mississippi County		
Shirley	1	Van Buren County	72153	
Shives	1	Chicot County	71653	
Shoffner	1	Jackson County	72154	
Shopton	1	Sevier County		
Shorewood Hills	1	Hot Spring County		
Shover Springs	1	Hempstead County	71801	
Shreveport Junction	1	Lafayette County		
Shuler	1	Union County	71730	
Shumaker	1	Ouachita County		
Shumaker Park	1	Ouachita County		
Sidney	1	Sharp County	72577	
Sidon	1	White County	72137	
Siedenstricker	1	Prairie County		
Signal Hill	1	Stone County	72551	
Silex	1	Pope County		
Sills	1	Yell County		
Siloam Springs	1	Benton County	72761	
Silver	1	Montgomery County	71957	
Silver Hill	1	Searcy County		
Silver Ridge	1	Sevier County	71846	
Simmons	1	Independence County		
Simmons Ford	1	Carroll County		
Simpson	1	Bradley County		
Simpson	1	Pope County		
Sims	1	Montgomery County	71969	
Simsboro	1	Crittenden County		
Sisemore	1	Lonoke County		
Sitka	1	Sharp County	72482	
Skaggs	1	Randolph County		
Skunkhollow	1	Faulkner County	72032	
Skylight	1	Washington County		
Slaytonville	1	Sebastian County	72937	
Slick Rock Ford	1	Cleburne County		
Sloan	1	Lawrence County		
Slonikers Mill	1	St. Francis County	72372	
Slovak	1	Prairie County	72160	
Smackover	1	Union County	71762	
Smale	1	Monroe County	72021	
Smead	1	Ouachita County		
Smearney	1	Bradley County	76147	
Smearny	1	Bradley County		
Smeltzer	1	Crawford County		
Smith	1	Union County		
Smithdale	1	Cross County		
Smiths Corner	1	Lee County	72368	
Smithton	1	Clark County	71743	
Smithville	1	Lawrence County	72466	
Smithville	1	Miller County		
Smithville	1	Union County		
Smyrna	1	Clark County		
Smyrna	1	Pope County	72843	
Snipe	1	Columbia County		
Snow	1	Marion County	72687	
Snowball	1	Searcy County	72676	
Snow Hill	1	Ouachita County	71751	
Snow Lake	1	Desha County	72379	
Snyder	1	Ashley County	71658	
Social Hill	1	Hot Spring County	72104	
Solgohachia	1	Conway County	72156	
Solo	1	Pope County		
Sonora	1	Washington County	72764	
Sorrells	1	Jefferson County		
Soudan	1	Lee County	72360	
South Crossett	1	Ashley County	71635	
Southerlands Crossroads	1	Franklin County	72949	
South Fort Smith	1	Sebastian County	72906	
South Hot Springs	1	Garland County	71901	
South Jacksonville	1	Pulaski County	72117	
Southland	1	Craighead County		
Southland	1	Phillips County	72355	
South Lead Hill	1	Boone County	72601	
South Ozark	1	Franklin County	72949	
South Pine Bluff	1	Jefferson County	71601	
South Sheridan	1	Grant County	72150	
South Side	1	Independence County	72575	
South Side	1	Pulaski County	72206	
Southside	1	Van Buren County	72013	
Southwestern Proving Ground	1	Hempstead County		
Southwest Little Rock	1	Pulaski County	72204	
Southwick	1	Pulaski County		
Spadra	1	Johnson County	72830	
Sparkman	1	Dallas County	71763	
Spear Lake	1	Poinsett County	72365	
Spirit Lake	1	Lafayette County	71845	
Spotville	1	Columbia County	71753	
Spriggs Mill	1	Jackson County		
Spring Creek	1	Lee County	72360	
Springdale	2	Benton County	72764	
Springdale	2	Washington County	72764	72766
Springfield	1	Conway County	72157	
Springhill	1	Faulkner County	72058	
Spring Hill	1	Hempstead County	71801	
Spring Hill	1	Ouachita County		
Springtown	1	Benton County	72767	
Spring Valley	1	Pulaski County		
Spring Valley	1	Washington County	72764	
Sprotville	1	Columbia County		
Sprudel	1	Hempstead County		
Spur Four	1	Mississippi County		
Stacy	1	Crittenden County	72384	
Stacy	1	Poinsett County	72472	
Stafford	1	Yell County		
Stamps	1	Lafayette County	71860	
Standard Umpstead	1	Ouachita County	71762	
Stanford	1	Greene County	72450	
Stanocola	1	Chicot County		
Star City	1	Lincoln County	71667	
Stark	1	Cleburne County	72067	
Stark City	1	Mississippi County		
State Capital	1	Pulaski County	72201	
State Line	1	Columbia County	71740	
State Line	1	Lafayette County	71861	
State School	1	Drew County		
State Services	1	Saline County	72158	
State University	1	Craighead County	72467	
Staves	1	Cleveland County	71665	
Stegall	1	Jackson County		
Stella	1	Izard County		
Stelltown	1	Pike County		
Stephens	1	Ouachita County	71764	
Steprock	1	White County	72159	
Sterling Spring	1	Craighead County	72401	
Steve	1	Yell County	72857	
Stevens Creek	1	White County	72010	
Stewart	1	Poinsett County		
Stier	1	Craighead County		
Stillions	1	Ashley County		
Stillwater	1	Yell County		
Stimson	1	Desha County		
Stockton	1	Nevada County		
Stokes	1	Randolph County	72455	
Stonewall	1	Greene County	72450	
Stony Point	1	Perry County	72070	
Stony Point	1	White County	72012	
Story	1	Montgomery County	71970	
Stoverville	1	Newton County	72624	
Strangers Home	1	Lawrence County	72410	
Strawberry	1	Johnson County		
Strawberry	1	Lawrence County	72469	
Strickler	1	Washington County	72774	
Stringer	1	Mississippi County		
Stringers Mill	1	Jackson County		
Stringtown	1	Sevier County	71842	
Strong	1	Union County	71765	
Stuart	1	Sharp County	72542	
Stumptoe	1	Van Buren County		
Sturkie	1	Fulton County	72578	
Stuttgart	1	Arkansas County	72160	
Subiaco	1	Logan County	72865	
Success	1	Clay County	72470	
Sugar Grove	1	Logan County	72927	
Sugar Hill	1	Washington County	72744	
Sugar Loaf	1	Boone County	72644	
Sugarloaf Lake	1	Sebastian County	72937	
Sulphur City	1	Washington County	72701	
Sulphur Rock	1	Independence County	72579	
Sulphur Springs	1	Ashley County		
Sulphur Springs	1	Benton County	72768	
Sulphur Springs	1	Jefferson County	71601	
Sulphur Springs	1	Johnson County	72830	
Sulphur Springs	1	Yell County	72834	
Summers	1	Washington County	72769	
Summers Ford	1	Carroll County		
Summerville	1	Calhoun County		
Summerville Ford	1	Grant County		
Summit	1	Clark County		
Summit	1	Marion County	72677	
Sumpter	1	Bradley County	71647	
Sunnydale	1	White County	72159	
Sunny Hill	1	White County	72143	
Sunnyside	1	Chicot County		
Sunnyside	1	Conway County		
Sunset	1	Crittenden County	72364	
Sunset	1	Washington County	72959	
Sunshine	1	Ashley County	71661	
Sunshine	1	Garland County	71968	
Supply	1	Randolph County	72444	
Sutherland Crossroads	1	Franklin County		
Suttle	1	Washington County		
Sutton	1	Nevada County	71835	
Swain	1	Newton County	72854	
Swan Lake	1	Jefferson County	72004	
Sweden	1	Jefferson County	72004	
Sweet Home	1	Perry County		
Sweet Home	1	Pulaski County	72164	
Swifton	1	Jackson County	72471	
Sycamore	1	Boone County		
Sycamore	1	Clark County	71743	
Sycamore Bend	1	St. Francis County	72348	
Sycamore Bend Farm	1	St. Francis County		
Sylamore	1	Izard County	72556	
Sylvan Hills	1	Pulaski County	72116	
Sylvania	1	Lonoke County	72176	

== Townships ==
Name of place	Number of counties	Principal county	Lower zip code	Upper zip code
Sage Township	1	Izard County		
St. Francis Township	1	Clay County		
St. Francis Township	1	Greene County		
St. Francis Township	1	Lee County		
St. Francis Township	1	Phillips County		
St. Joe Township	1	Searcy County		
St. Vincent Township	1	Conway County		
Salado Township	1	Independence County		
Salem Township	1	Greene County		
Salem Township	1	Saline County		
Saline Township	1	Cleburne County		
Saline Township	1	Cleveland County		
Saline Township	1	Drew County		
Saline Township	1	Hempstead County		
Saline Township	1	Hot Spring County		
Saline Township	1	Howard County		
Saline Township	1	Pike County		
Saline Township	1	Saline County		
Saline Township	1	Sevier County		
Sand Point Township	1	Crawford County		
Saratoga Township	1	Howard County		
Scott Township	1	Lonoke County		
Scott Township	1	Mississippi County		
Scott Township	1	Poinsett County		
Scott Township	1	Sharp County		
Searcy Township	1	Cross County		
Searcy Township	1	Phillips County		
Self Creek Township	1	Pike County		
Shady Grove Township	1	Greene County		
Shady Grove Township	1	Searcy County		
Shaw Township	1	Saline County		
Shepherd Township	1	Crawford County		
Sherman Township	1	Johnson County		
Shiloh Township	1	Randolph County		
Shoal Creek Township	1	Logan County		
Shores Township	1	Franklin County		
Short Mountain Township	1	Logan County		
Shumaker	1	Calhoun County		
Siloam Township	1	Randolph County		
Silver Lake Township	1	Desha County		
Simpson Township	1	Grant County		
Sims Township	1	Montgomery County		
Six Mile Township	1	Franklin County		
Six Mile Township	1	Logan County		
Smackover Township	1	Ouachita County		
Smackover Township	1	Union County		
Smalley Township	1	Monroe County		
Smart Township	1	Stone County		
Smith Township	1	Cleveland County		
Smith Township	1	Cross County		
Smith Township	1	Dallas County		
Smith Township	1	Lincoln County		
Smith Township	1	Saline County		
Smyrna Township	1	Pope County		
Southall Township	1	Dallas County		
South Big Rock Township	1	Sharp County		
South Fork Township	1	Fulton County		
South Fork Township	1	Montgomery County		
South Harrison Township	1	Boone County		
South Joe Burleson Township	1	Marion County		
South Lebanon Township	1	Sharp County		
South Tomahawk Township	1	Searcy County		
South Union Township	1	Sharp County		
South Yocum Township	1	Carroll County		
Spadra Township	1	Johnson County		
Spring Township	1	Jefferson County		
Spring Township	1	Lincoln County		
Spring Township	1	Searcy County		
Spring Creek Township	1	Lee County		
Spring Creek Township	1	Phillips County		
Springdale Township	1	Washington County		
Spring Grove Township	1	Greene County		
Spring Hill Township	1	Drew County		
Springhill Township	1	Hempstead County		
Spring River Township	1	Lawrence County		
Spring River Township	1	Randolph County		
Stanley Township	1	Arkansas County		
Starr Hill Township	1	Washington County		
Steel Township	1	Lafayette County		
Steele Township	1	Conway County		
Stonewall Township	1	Johnson County		
Strawberry Township	1	Fulton County		
Strawberry Township	1	Izard County		
Strawberry Township	1	Lawrence County		
Strawberry Township	1	Sharp County		
Sugar Camp Township	1	Cleburne County		
Sugar Creek Township	1	Benton County		
Sugar Creek Township	1	Greene County		
Sugar Creek Township	1	Logan County		
Sugar Loaf Township	1	Boone County		
Sugar Loaf Township	1	Cleburne County		
Sugarloaf Township	1	Marion County		
Sugarloaf Township	1	Sebastian County		
Sulphur Township	1	Garland County		
Sulphur Township	1	Miller County		
Sulphur Township	1	Montgomery County		
Sulphur Springs Township	1	Benton County		
Sulphur Springs Township	1	Searcy County		
Sulphur Springs Township	1	Yell County		
Summit Township	1	Boone County		
Summit Township	1	Marion County		
Sumpter Township	1	Bradley County		
Swain Township	1	Clay County		
Swayne Township	1	Mississippi County		
Sylamore Township	1	Stone County		
