= Shady Grove =

Shady Grove may refer to:

== Places in the United States ==
- Shady Grove, Alabama
- Shady Grove, Arkansas (disambiguation), several places
- Shady Grove, Illinois
- Shady Grove, Iowa
- Shady Grove, Kentucky
- Shady Grove, Maryland
  - Shady Grove station
- Shady Grove, Missouri (disambiguation), several places
- Shady Grove, Oklahoma (disambiguation), several places
- Shady Grove, Pennsylvania
- Shady Grove, Tennessee (disambiguation), several places
- Shady Grove, Texas (disambiguation), several places
- Shady Grove, Virginia
- Shady Grove (Gladys, Virginia), a historic house

== Music ==
- "Shady Grove" (song), an Appalachian folk song
- Shady Grove (Quicksilver Messenger Service album), 1969
- Shady Grove (Jerry Garcia and David Grisman album), 1996
- Shady Grove, an album by the Figgs, 2019
