= Shady Grove, Arkansas =

Shady Grove, Arkansas may refer to any of the following places in the United States:

- Shady Grove, Baxter County, Arkansas, in Arkansas
- Shady Grove, Fulton County, Arkansas, in Arkansas
- Shady Grove, Johnson County, Arkansas, in Arkansas
- Shady Grove, Logan County, Arkansas, in Arkansas
- Shady Grove, Mississippi County, Arkansas, in Arkansas
- Shady Grove, Nevada County, Arkansas, in Arkansas
- Shady Grove, Poinsett County, Arkansas, in Arkansas
- Shady Grove, Pulaski County, Arkansas, in Arkansas
- Shady Grove, Washington County, Arkansas
- Shady Grove, Woodruff County, Arkansas, in Woodruff County, Arkansas
- Shady Grove Township, Searcy County, Arkansas

== See also ==
- Shady Grove (disambiguation)
