= Tornado outbreak of April 25–28, 2024 =

April 2024 United States tornado outbreak and flood

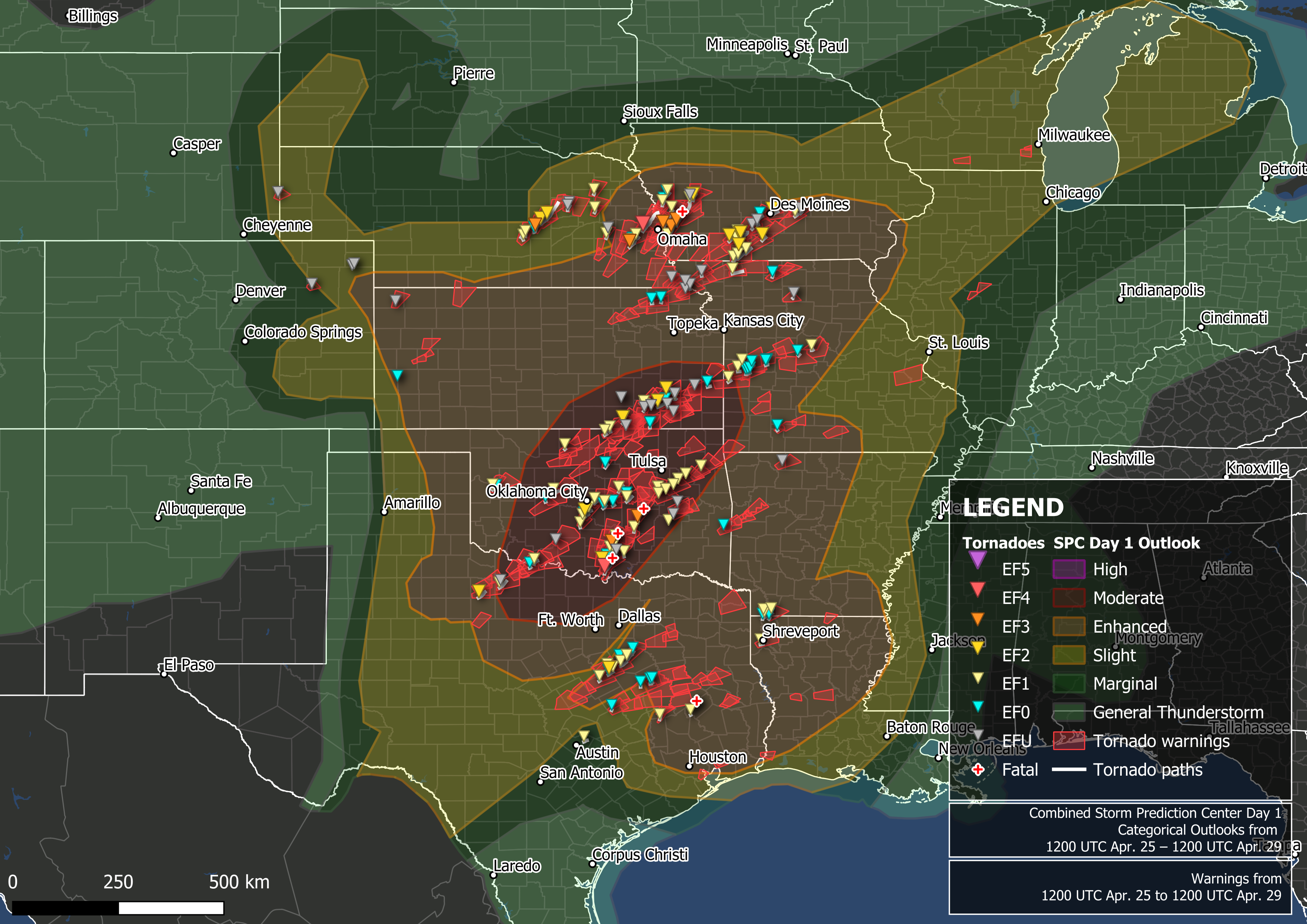
- Map of tornado warnings and confirmed tornadoes from the outbreak

Meteorological history
- Duration: April 25–28, 2024

Tornado outbreak
- Tornadoes: 165
- Max. rating: EF4 tornado
- Duration: 4 days, 6 hours, 4 minutes
- Highest winds: Tornadic – 170 mph (270 km/h) (Elkhorn, Nebraska EF4 on April 26, Marietta, Oklahoma EF4 on April 27) (A 224 mph (360 km/h) gust was calculated by DOW on April 26 near Harlan, Iowa (Note: A Doppler on Wheels calculated this ground wind speed from a measurement of 177 mph (285 km/h) at 282 yards (258 m) above the surface.))
- Highest gusts: Non-tornadic – 80 mph (130 km/h) near Ball, Louisiana on April 28
- Largest hail: 3.0 in (7.6 cm) – near Mount Ayr, Iowa (April 26) and Fox, Oklahoma (April 28)

Extratropical cyclone
- Lowest pressure: 990 hPa (mbar); 29.23 inHg

Overall effects
- Fatalities: 6
- Injuries: 178+ total
- Missing: 1
- Damage: $1.2 billion (2024 USD)
- Areas affected: Midwestern, Southern United States, High Plains
- Power outages: >40,000
- Part of the Tornadoes of 2024

From April 25 to 28, 2024, a large-scale and destructive tornado outbreak occurred across the Midwestern, Southern, and High Plains regions of the United States, primarily on April 26 and 27. On April 26, the Storm Prediction Center (SPC) first issued an enhanced risk for the Plains, as a broad upper-trough moved eastwards, with strong tornadic activity erupting in the states of Nebraska, Iowa, and Kansas later that day. A high-end EF3 tornado struck the northeastern outskirts of Lincoln, Nebraska in Lancaster County, injuring three people. A long-tracked low-end EF4 tornado caused widespread severe damage in Elkhorn and near Bennington and Blair, and prompted the issuance of two tornado emergencies. Another EF3 tornado moved through parts of both Omaha and Council Bluffs, Iowa as well as points northeast, injuring four more people. Another long-tracked EF3 tornado moved directly through Minden, Iowa, killing one person and injuring three others, prompting the issuance of two more tornado emergencies. An EF2 tornado also moved through Pleasant Hill just southeast of Des Moines, injuring one person.

On April 27, a moderate risk was issued by the SPC for areas further south in Oklahoma and millions were put under a particularly dangerous situation (PDS) tornado watch. Several PDS tornado warnings were issued that day, especially during the nighttime hours, as strong to violent tornadoes touched down. A catastrophic high-end EF3 tornado moved directly through Sulphur, Oklahoma, killing one person and injuring 30 others. Another EF3 tornado destroyed multiple homes as it passed near Holdenville, killing two people. The strongest tornado of the night was a violent, low-end EF4 tornado that moved through the western part of Marietta, killing a person on I-35 and destroying a large warehouse and a grocery store. Only weak tornadoes touched down on April 28, but one high-end EF1 tornado caused a fatality and an injury when it destroyed a mobile home near Trinity, Texas.

The outbreak was the largest since a similarly large and deadly outbreak the year prior, although this one was spread out over a slightly larger time period and was not as deadly. As a result of this outbreak, 6 people died and 150 others were injured. With a grand total of 164 tornadoes over a two-day period, the tornado outbreak gained 87 points on the outbreak intensity score. The outbreak served as the beginning of a broader 16-day period of constant severe weather and tornado activity across the United States that would continue until May 10.

== Meteorological synopsis ==
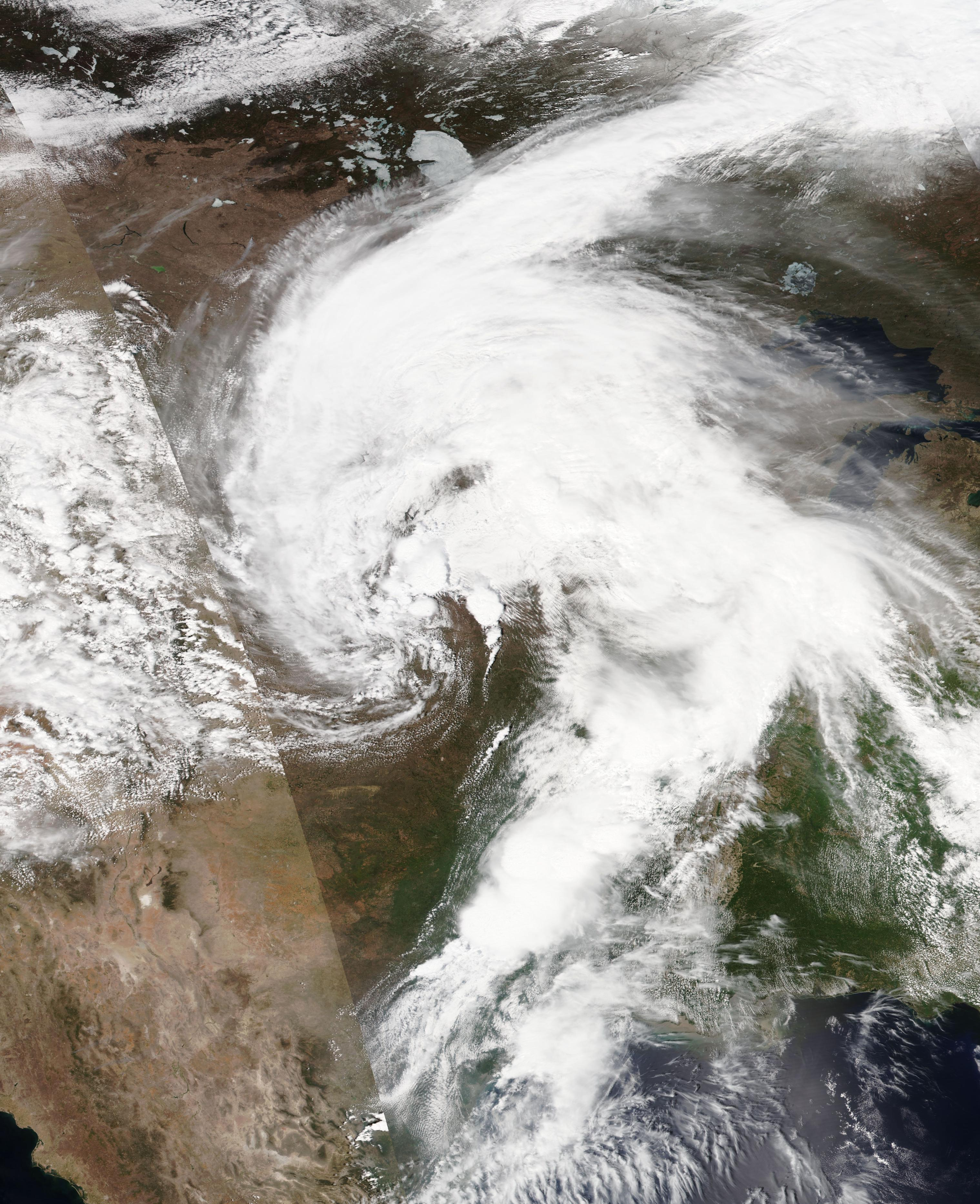
Satellite image of the storm system responsible for the tornado outbreak that occurred on April 25–28, 2024.

On April 20, 2024, the National Weather Service's Storm Prediction Center (SPC) first delineated a severe weather risk for April 25–26, highlighting a zone extending from the Central Great Plains northeastward to the Midwestern U.S. The forecast was predicated on the development of thunderstorms downwind of an upper-tropospheric trough, where weather forecast models were depicting the advection of a moist airmass. The forecast was maintained through the next two days. The risk area was expanded into northeastern Texas on April 22 and later extended to include the possibility of severe weather on April 27.

=== April 25 ===
On the morning of April 25, the SPC predicted an enhanced risk of severe weather for parts of Kansas, Oklahoma, and Texas, highlighting the risk of tornadoes and large hail in connection with storms developing along a dry line between the Texas Panhandle and northwestern Kansas. This risk was later narrowed to two focal areas: one in northwestern Kansas associated with supercells during the afternoon and evening, and a second near the Red River, associated with an forecast cluster of storms during the overnight hours. During the afternoon, numerous thunderstorms developed near the dry line in eastern Colorado and near a low-pressure area in northeastern Colorado, southwestern Nebraska, and northwestern Kansas. These storms weakened during the evening upon moving northeastward into areas with less atmospheric instability, with the threat for tornadoes diminishing overnight. The SPC received six tornado reports from April 25 from states affected by these storms; five EFU tornadoes were confirmed.

=== April 26 ===
Supercells moving through eastern Nebraska and western Iowa on April 26

Another cluster of thunderstorms developed in the Permian Basin of Texas in the early overnight hours into April 26, becoming and maintaining severe characteristics as they tracked northeast into the Red River Valley. This cluster eventually organized into a quasi-linear convective system over southern Oklahoma, potentially producing at least one tornado. The SPC received three reports of tornadoes from Oklahoma during the early morning hours of April 26; seven weak tornadoes were later confirmed in the state.

Up close dash cam footage of the Lincoln, Nebraska EF3 tornado

More significant severe weather was expected to occur later on in the day. The event was first forecasted to occur on April 20, when a 15% risk area was issued across much of the south-central United States by the Storm Prediction Center for April 26. By April 23, the 15% area had been expanded tremendously, covering areas from the eastern Great Plains into the mid-Mississippi Valley. On April 24, the 15% risk area transitioned into slight risk area that covered the same area with all severe weather hazards expected. With an enhanced risk of severe weather in place, the Storm Prediction issued a tornado watch for eastern Oklahoma on the morning of April 26. Several hours later, on the afternoon of April 26, another tornado watch was implemented for northeastern Nebraska, which included the possibility for "a couple of intense tornadoes." At 3:41 p.m. CDT, a tornado emergency was issued for West Elkhorn as a large and destructive tornado moved through the area. Some homes were completely leveled and many more structures suffered significant damage. Another storm produced a large tornado near Harlan, Iowa, causing widespread destruction. A Doppler on Wheels (DOW) mobile radar truck measured 1-second wind speeds of approximately 224 mph (360 km/h) at a height of ~282 yards (258 m) with the Harlan storm.

=== April 27–28 ===
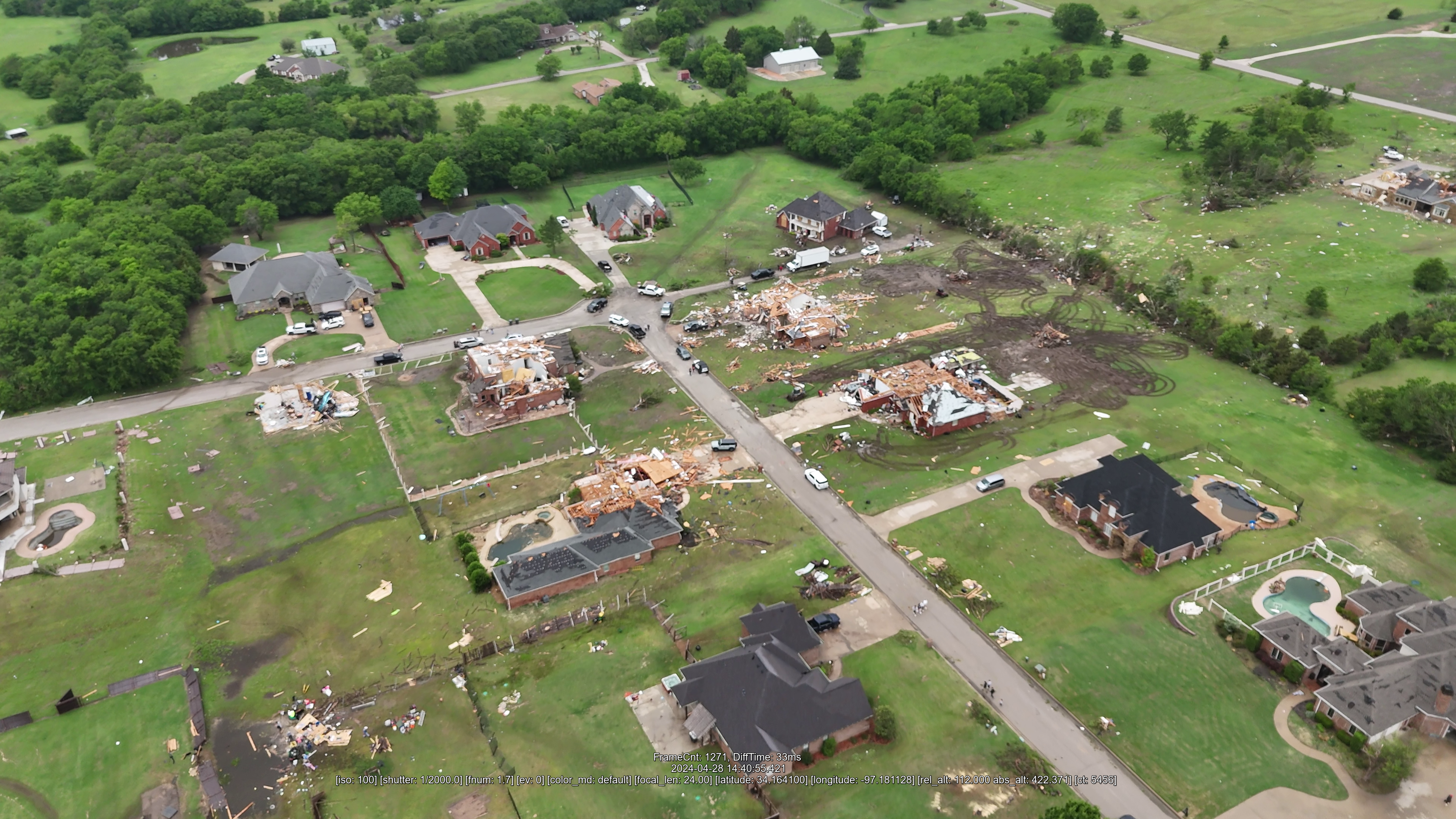
Significant damage to homes in southwest Ardmore, Oklahoma after a high-end EF2 tornado impacted the area.

In the morning hours of April 27, the Storm Prediction Center issued a moderate risk (level 4) for central Oklahoma, north-central Texas, extreme southwestern Missouri, and southeastern Kansas. The moderate risk included a significant 15% tornado risk, a significant 30% wind risk, and a significant 45% hail risk. Multiple supercells formed that afternoon in northern Texas, western Oklahoma, southeastern Kansas, and northwestern Missouri. A 'particularly dangerous situation' (PDS) tornado watch was issued for western Oklahoma and northern Texas, warning of elevated probabilities for several tornadoes, some of which could be intense.

As the day went on, multiple tornadoes touched down, including a large tornado that passed near the town of Knox City, and another near Burkburnett, both in Texas. Numerous PDS tornado warnings were issued for large tornadoes near Cedar Vale, Kansas, as well as Newkirk, Oklahoma. However, much of the western part of the risk area remained storm free for much of the day. As the day went on, supercells in the center of the main risk area waned, and a more linear mode developed. The 00:00 UTC upper-air sounding from Norman, Oklahoma, depicted very strong shear, with storm-relative helicity in the 0–3 kilometer layer of 400 m^{2}/s^{2} and mixed-layer CAPE of around 2300 J/kg. As the lower-level jet further increased, 0–1 km SRH was observed at 600 m^{2}/s^{2}. Over the course of the successive hours, new tornadic supercells developed ahead of the main squall line and produced multiple large and intense tornadoes in southern and eastern Oklahoma. These tornadoes caused significant damage and prompted PDS tornado warnings for the towns of Ardmore, Holdenville, Marietta, Okemah and Sulphur. A total of 23 PDS tornado warnings were issued as the intense storms caused damage.

== Confirmed tornadoes ==
Confirmed tornadoes by Enhanced Fujita rating
EFU	EF0	EF1	EF2	EF3	EF4	EF5	Total
32	42	66	16	7	2	0	165

=== Elkhorn–Bennington–Blair, Nebraska/Modale, Iowa ===
Elkhorn–Bennington–Blair, Nebraska/Modale, Iowa
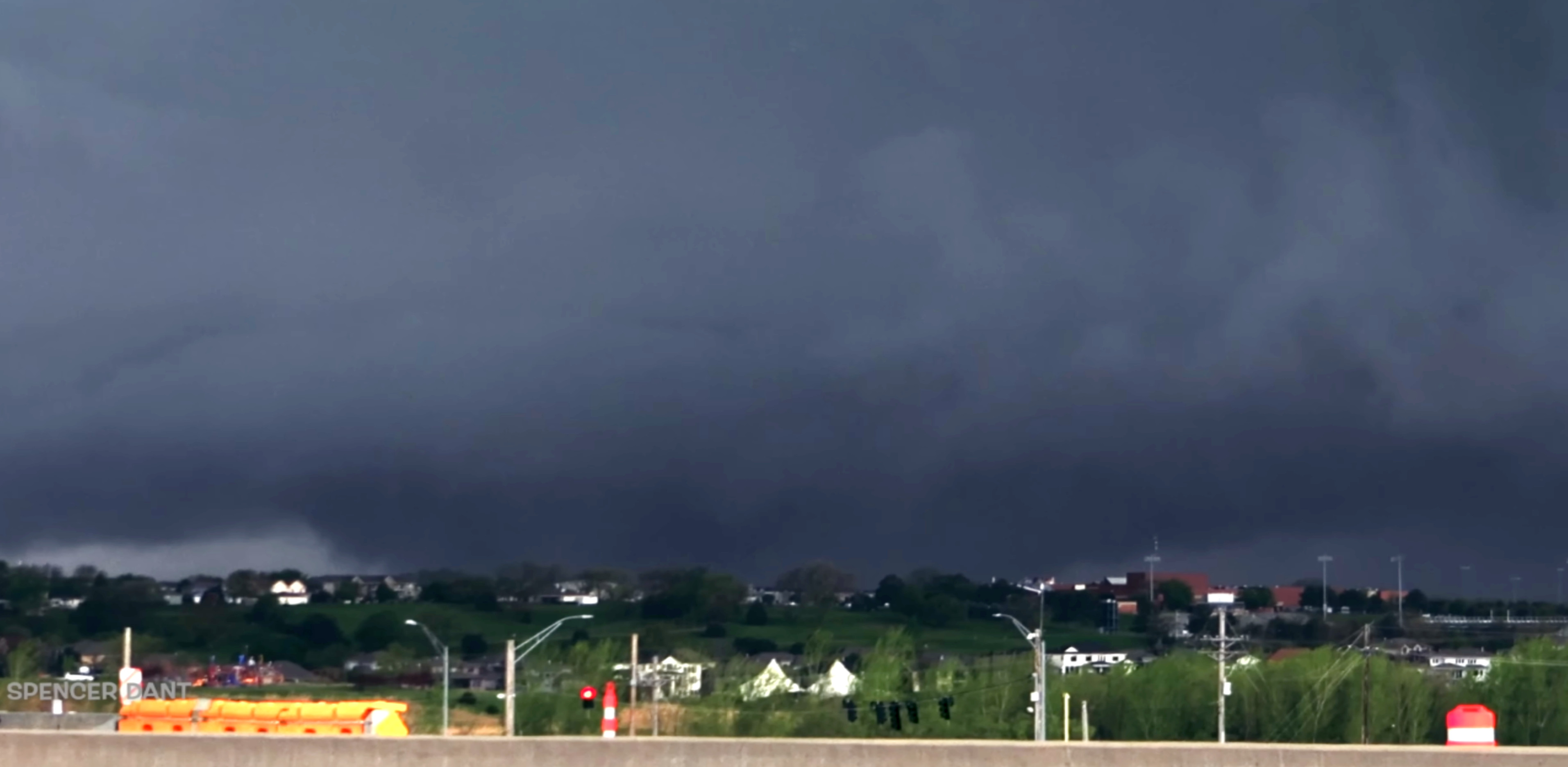
- The tornado approaching its peak intensity in Elkhorn, Nebraska.

Meteorological history
- Formed: April 26, 2024, 3:30 p.m. CDT (UTC−05:00)
- Dissipated: April 26, 2024, 4:31 p.m. CDT (UTC−05:00)
- Duration: 1 hour, 1 minute

EF4 tornado
- on the Enhanced Fujita scale
- Highest winds: 170 mph (270 km/h)

Overall effects
- Fatalities: 0
- Injuries: 4

This very large, violent, long-tracked tornado first touched down at 3:30 pm CDT south of West Q Road near the Platte River and traveled northeastward, damaging trees and farmstead outbuildings at EF0-EF1 intensity. The tornado then intensified to EF2 strength, damaging numerous homes, including one that was unroofed, overturned multiple center pivots in several acreages, and damaged outbuildings and a grain silo. At 3:38 pm CDT, a tornado emergency was issued once it became clear that a destructive tornado was ongoing, with another one being issued for locations further to the northeast 3 minutes later. The tornado then weakened to EF1 intensity as it crossed L-28B, damaging a horse farm and a home, several trees, and other center pivots. As the tornado entered the western part of Omaha neighborhood of Elkhorn, it abruptly became violent and widened significantly, striking multiple subdivisions. Many homes in this area were severely damaged or destroyed, including some that were flattened. At least three homes were partially to completely swept away as well, and a metal building system was heavily damaged. The tornado also collapsed metal light poles near the Prospect Hill Cemetery, where several headstones were damaged, a landscaping business was damaged, and trees and wooden and steel power poles were snapped. Most of the most intense damage in the area was rated high-end EF3, but two small pockets of low-end EF4 damage were confirmed; both of these locations had homes that were partially to completely swept away with the first location also having debarked trees.

The tornado then narrowed and weakened to EF1 strength as it continued northeastward, snapping trees and damaging the roofs of outbuildings and homes. The tornado then gradually reached high-end EF2 intensity again as it approached and moved through residential areas the west side of Bennington. Many homes suffered severe roof and exterior wall damage, including some that had their roofs removed and/or exterior walls knocked down, and many trees and power poles were snapped. Past Bennington, the tornado continued to snap trees and power lines and damage outbuildings at EF1 intensity before moving into Washington County. The tornado regained EF2 strength upon entering the county, causing moderate to heavy damage to homes and damaging or destroying outbuildings well east of Washington. Continuing northeastward, it further strengthened and briefly reached low-end EF3 intensity, shifting an unanchored home off its foundation, which caused it to be destroyed, rolling or lofting flatbed and horse-trailers, and destroying a machine shop and horse barns, killing at least one horse and injuring several others. Another unanchored home was shifted off its foundation and partially collapsed, power poles were snapped, and more trees were uprooted or snapped. As it approached N-133, the tornado continued to cause mid-range to high-end EF2 damage, ripping the roofs off and knocking down the exterior walls of homes, damaging or destroying outbuildings, damaging at least one mobile home, snapping wooden power poles, and snapping or uprooting numerous trees. One home along County Road 36 was left with only interior walls standing, and the damage there was rated mid-range EF3.

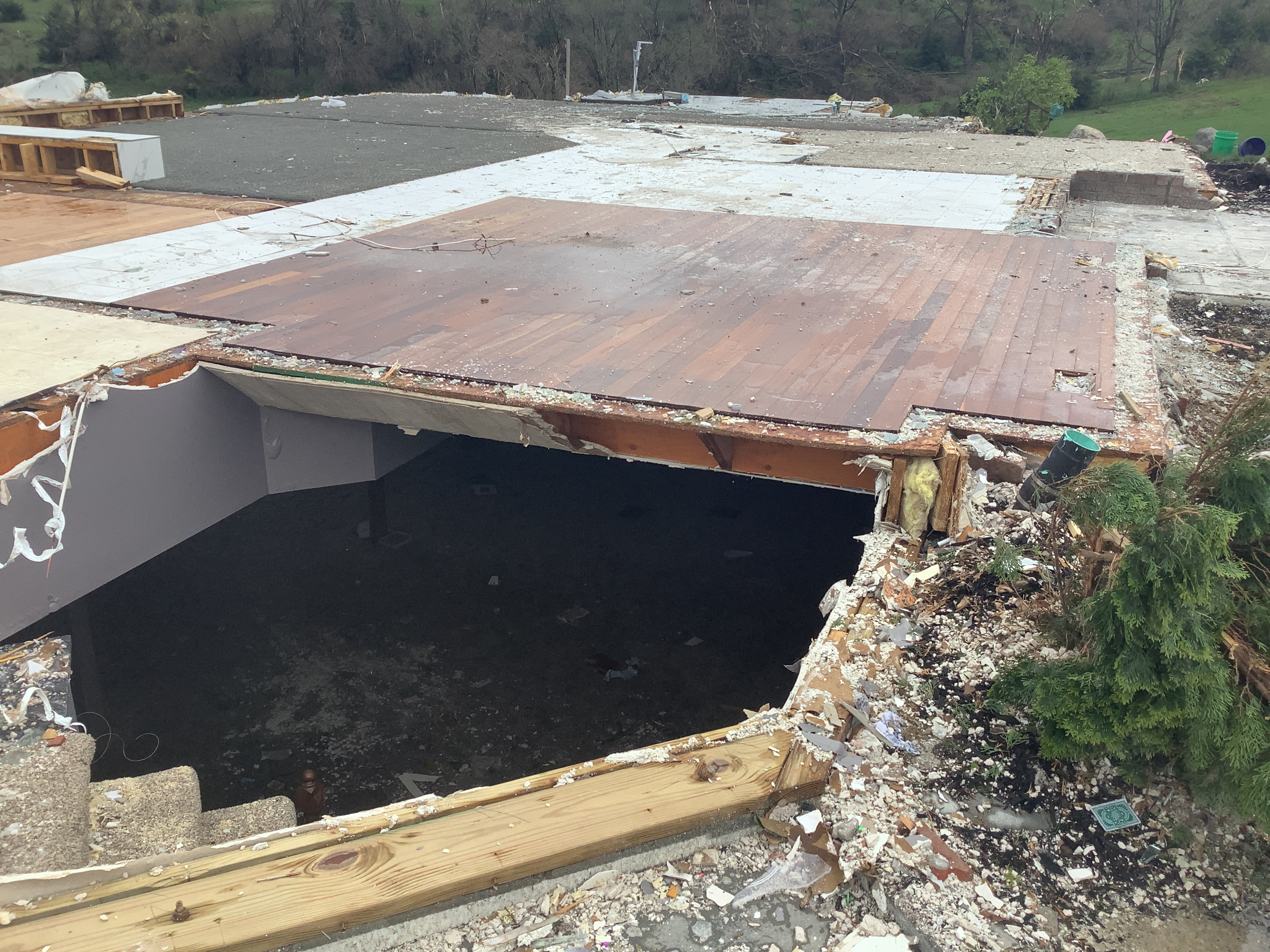
A home that was destroyed at high-end EF3 intensity south of Blair, Nebraska.

After crossing N-133, the tornado rapidly intensified and became violent for the third time as it impacted small neighborhoods to the south of Blair. Several homes were heavily damaged or completely destroyed, including some that were swept away. These homes were either unanchored or poorly anchored, although one of them was well-built enough to receive a low-end EF4 rating in the reanalysis; the other homes received a high-end EF3 rating. Other homes in the area were also unroofed with some or all of the exterior walls knocked down. Northeast of there, the tornado inflicted EF2 damage to homes before destroying another unanchored home at mid-range EF3 intensity and causing extensive tree damage. The tornado then briefly weakened, causing EF0-EF1 damage to homes and trees before regaining EF2 intensity as it crossed US 75. An unanchored home was shifted off its foundation and leveled, other homes suffered minor to heavy roof damage, trees and power poles were snapped, and several 50 ft (15 m) tank cars at Cargill Plant were derailed. The tornado then weakened again and crossed the Missouri River into Iowa, producing EF0 damage to trees as it moved northeastward. The tornado then crossed over US 30 and moved across bottom-land/agricultural areas at EF0-EF1 intensity, snapping or uprooting several trees and tipping over center pivots. The tornado then turned east-northeast and dissipated south of Modale at 4:31 pm CDT.

The tornado was on the ground for just over an hour, traveling 32.50 miles (52.30 km), and reaching a peak width of 1,900 yards (1,700 m). Initially, the tornado was rated high-end EF3 with wind speeds of 165 mph (266 km/h), but a reanalysis completed in late-July found the three aforementioned areas of violent damage, which resulted in the tornado being upgraded to low-end EF4, making it the first violent tornado to occur in the state of Nebraska since June 16, 2014. Four people were injured.

=== Council Bluffs, Iowa/Omaha, Nebraska/Crescent–Beebeetown, Iowa ===
Council Bluffs, Iowa/Omaha, Nebraska/Crescent–Beebeetown, Iowa
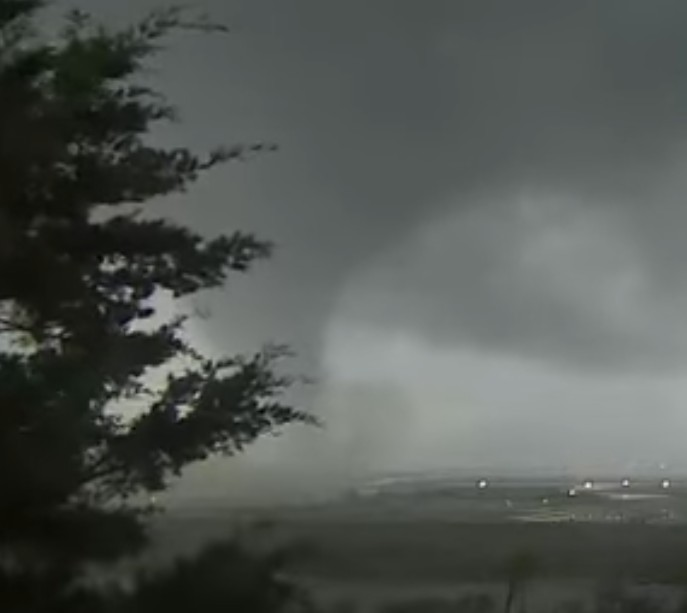
- An automated camera still of the tornado in Omaha

Meteorological history
- Formed: April 26, 2024, 4:54 p.m. CDT (UTC−05:00)
- Dissipated: April 26, 2024, 5:28 p.m. CDT (UTC−05:00)
- Duration: 34 minutes

EF3 tornado
- on the Enhanced Fujita scale
- Highest winds: 150 mph (240 km/h)

Overall effects
- Fatalities: 0
- Injuries: 0 (Possibly 4)

This destructive, intense tornado first touched down just north of US 6 in the western part of Council Bluffs, Iowa in Pottawattamie County at 4:54 pm CDT. It moved north-northeastward at high-end EF1 intensity, producing intermittent damage to the roofs of businesses, homes, and apartment buildings and snapping or uprooting trees. The tornado then crossed over I-29 and the Missouri River into the northeastern part of Omaha, Nebraska in Douglas County. As it moved onto the southeast side of the Eppley Airfield runway system, a local news tower cam captured the tornado live on video providing the first visual confirmation of the condensation funnel of the tornado reaching the ground. Initially, this was believed to be where the tornado first developed until further surveys confirmed that the tornado developed in Council Bluffs instead. The tornado strengthened to low-end EF2 intensity as it struck Eppley Airfield, leveling multiple unanchored aircraft hangars and flipping several general aviation airplanes. It also pulled a fire hydrant out of the ground and destroyed portions of the fencing that lined the airport.

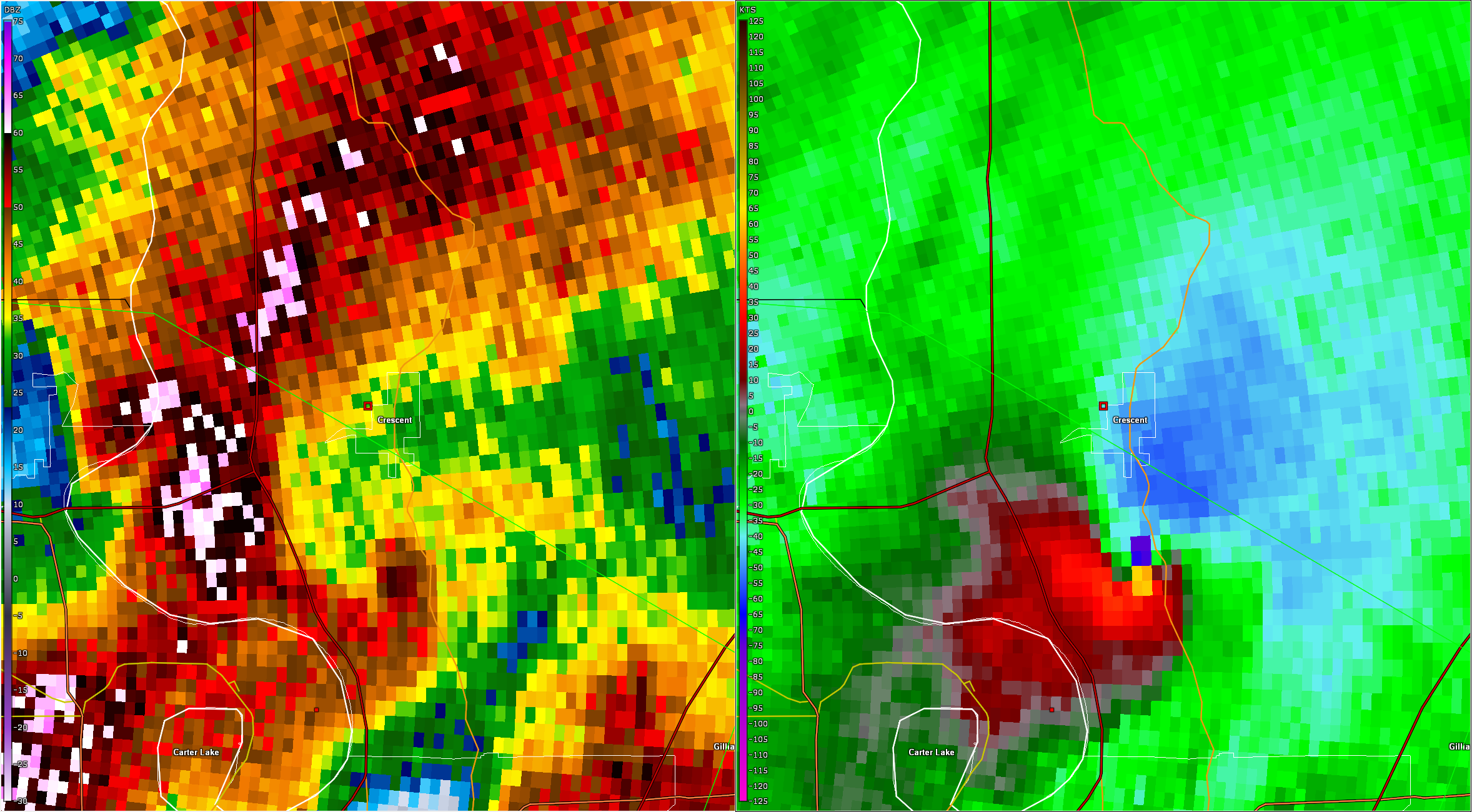
Radar image of the EF3 Crescent tornado at peak intensity south of the town.

The tornado then weakened back to EF1 intensity as it moved northeastward across the river again and back into Pottawattamie County, Iowa, and crossed I-29 again, damaging numerous homes, trees, and businesses as it began to grow in size. As the tornado crossed Little Kiln Road, it reached a quarter-mile in width and rapidly strengthened to its peak strength, knocking down all the exterior walls and some interior walls of a home at mid-range EF3 intensity. Continuing northeastward, the tornado crossed over Old Lincoln Highway south of Crescent at EF2 intensity, ripping off the roofs and knocking down the exterior walls of homes, shifting one home completely off its foundation, heavily damaging an outbuilding, and snapping and uprooting trees. A vehicle detail shop housed in a cinderblock building was also leveled. The structure was cemented to its foundation, but no J-bar anchoring was present. The tornado then damaged numerous trees in a wooded area before striking a property to the east of Crescent, causing major roof damage to a home, which also had its attached garage destroyed, damaging farm outbuildings, and snapping power poles and other poles. Northeast of there, the tornado shifted multiple unanchored homes off their foundations, including one that completely collapsed, destroyed a trailer, and snapped trees. The tornado then steadily weakened as it continued northeastward over agricultural fields and woodlands, causing EF1 damage to manufactured homes, grain bins, and farm outbuildings, and snapping trees along county roads as it moved into the rural Boomer Township. The tornado then weakened further to EF0 strength as it continued northeastward, destroying a shed and damaging a home, ripping off large portions of the roofs of other outbuildings, and snapping large tree limbs. Continuing to weaken, the tornado caused intermittent tree damage and crossed I-880 before dissipating in an agricultural field after crossing into Harrison County south of Beebeetown at 5:28 pm CDT.

The tornado was on the ground for 34 minutes, traveled 19.06 miles (30.67 km), and reached a peak width 550 yards (500 m). At least four people were reportedly injured in Pottawattamie County, although this was not officially counted.

=== Minden–Tennant–Harlan–Defiance, Iowa ===
Minden–Tennant–Harlan–Defiance, Iowa
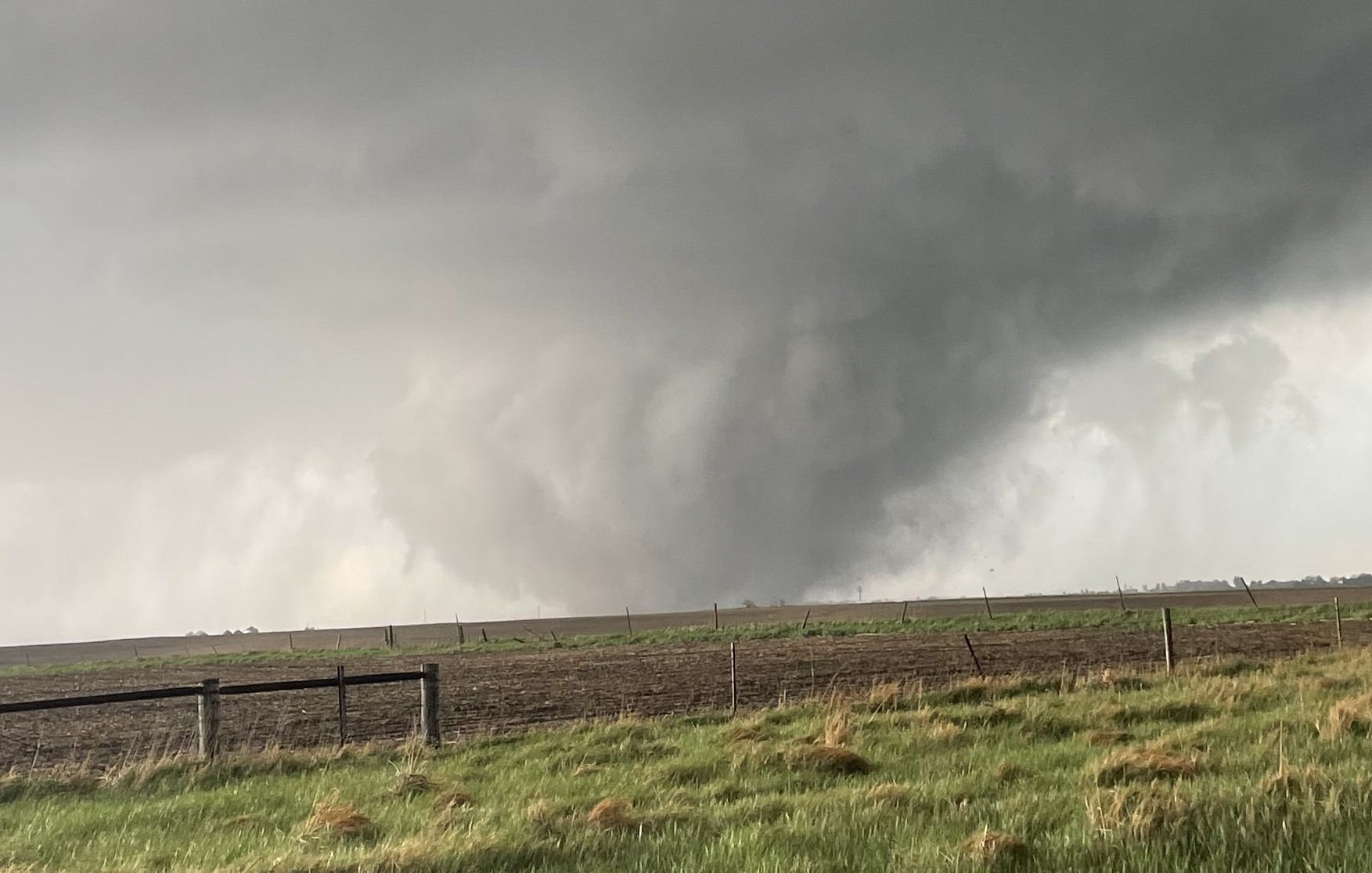
- The tornado viewed as it was moving near Minden, Iowa

Meteorological history
- Formed: April 26, 2024, 5:25 p.m. CDT (UTC−05:00)
- Dissipated: April 26, 2024, 6:29 p.m. CDT (UTC−05:00)
- Duration: 1 hour, 4 minutes

EF3 tornado
- on the Enhanced Fujita scale
- Highest winds: 160 mph (260 km/h)*; *A 224 mph (360 km/h) gust was measured by a DOW near Harlan, Iowa – unofficial academic analysis

Overall effects
- Fatalities: 1
- Injuries: 3

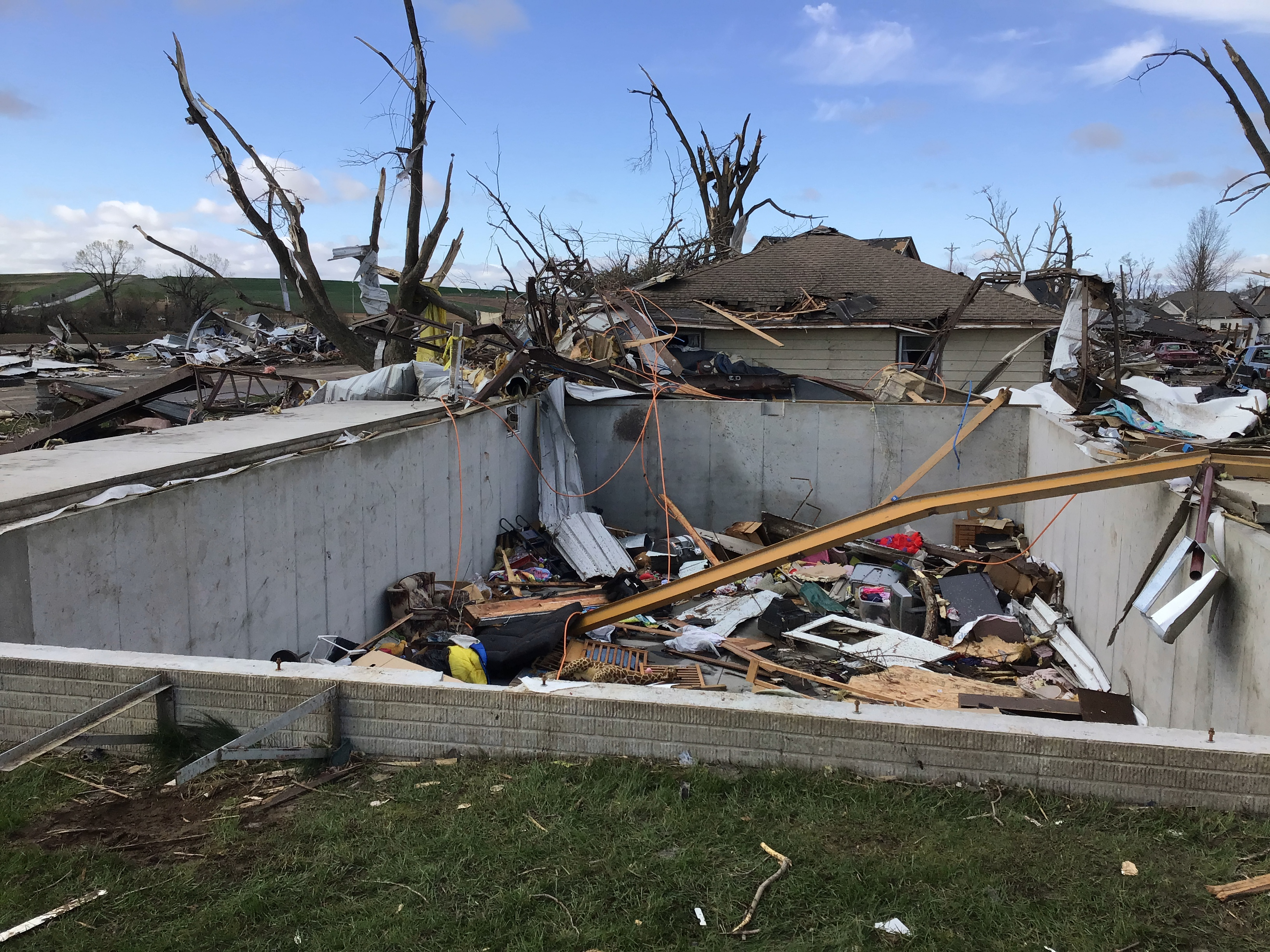
High-end EF3 tornado damage to a home in Minden, Iowa.

This very large multiple-vortex tornado touched down at 5:25 pm. CDT in central Pottawattamie County, as another EF3 tornado to its west from the same supercell was dissipating. Roughly for the next ten minutes, the tornado maintained EF0 strength, with damage limited to trees and outbuildings. The tornado then began to rapidly intensify as it approached Minden from the southwest, destroying outbuildings and snapping trees at EF2 intensity. As it entered Minden at around 5:42 pm. CDT, the tornado reached a width of just less than a half-mile as it impacted the southeast part of town. Several retail locations, as well as many homes in the area, were badly damaged or completely demolished. Continuing to rapidly intensify, the tornado reached its peak intensity in the far east side of Minden, where several poorly anchored homes were completely destroyed and leveled at high-end EF3 intensity. Several large metal buildings along Main Street were also destroyed. One fatality and three injuries occurred in Minden. The tornado more or less maintained its intensity as it crossed Tamarack Road and exited Minden around 5:45 pm. CDT, at which point a tornado emergency was issued for Minden and, later, points northeast. Several farmsteads and small homes in the area were damaged at EF2 or EF3 intensity. The tornado, around three-quarters of a mile wide, then crossed I-80, flipping a semi-truck, and produced a swath of vegetation and building damage to the north of the interstate along York Road.

Evolution of the Minden–Harlan tornado

The large tornado then moved into Shelby County and passed less than a mile to the west of Shelby continuing to cause tree and powerline damage over open terrain as it moved northeastward. As the tornado neared Tennant, it inflicted heavy EF2 damage to a home to the south of the town. Southeast of the town, another home suffered EF2 damage, and a barn was destroyed. To the northeast of Tennant, the tornado reached its peak width, producing an almost mile-wide swath of tree and power line damage. There was also roof damage to homes and outbuildings, including one outbuilding that was destroyed. The tornado then passed west of Harlan at around 6:06 pm. CDT, destroying a home along Iowa 44. Although most of the walls of the home were left standing, the damage was rated low-end EF3 based on nearby tree damage along with a large vehicle being thrown or rolled nearly a quarter-mile. At 6:08 pm. CDT, a Doppler on Wheels unit recorded wind speeds of 224 miles per hour (360 km/h) 600 metres (2,000 ft) aloft, winds equivalent to EF5 intensity on the Enhanced Fujita scale, although these winds did not impact any structures. EF2 damage occurred during this time as more outbuildings were destroyed, more homes suffered roof damage and trees suffered extensive damage. to the north of Harlan, three homes were suffered EF2 roof damage as the tornado crossed Iowa 59. Outbuildings were damaged or destroyed and more trees were snapped or uprooted.

After this, the tornado maintained EF2 intensity and turned due north, paralleling Iowa 59 as another tornado developed to its east. Damage here was mostly limited to trees and outbuildings, although one outbuilding was destroyed at low-end EF2 intensity. The tornado would narrowly miss Defiance and become rain-wrapped with another tornado crossing its damage path in this area about 30 minutes later. The tornado then dissipated to the north of the town around 6:29 pm. CDT. The tornado was on the ground for just over an hour, traveling 40.91 miles (65.84 km), and reaching a peak width of 1,900 yards (1,700 m). At least two other tornadoes touched down as or after this tornado dissipated.

=== Sulphur, Oklahoma ===
Sulphur, Oklahoma
- The tornado illuminated by a power flash as it was in downtown Sulphur.

Meteorological history
- Formed: April 27, 2024, 10:23 p.m. CDT (UTC−05:00)
- Dissipated: April 27, 2024, 10:37 p.m. CDT (UTC−05:00)
- Duration: 14 minutes

EF3 tornado
- on the Enhanced Fujita scale
- Highest winds: 165 mph (266 km/h)

Overall effects
- Fatalities: 1
- Injuries: 30

This intense tornado initially touched down in the Chickasaw National Recreation Area at 10:23 pm CDT in Murray County and moved north-northeastward, before turning rightward at a more northeasterly track. Damage along this segment was generally limited to snapped or uprooted trees, including areas of high-end EF1 damage, although one outbuilding was damaged. It then moved into a residential area just southwest of Sulphur at EF2 strength, where multiple homes lost large portions of their roofs, including one home that had its entire roof removed and an exterior wall knocked down. A mobile home was damaged, a large tree had large limbs snapped, and other trees were snapped or uprooted.

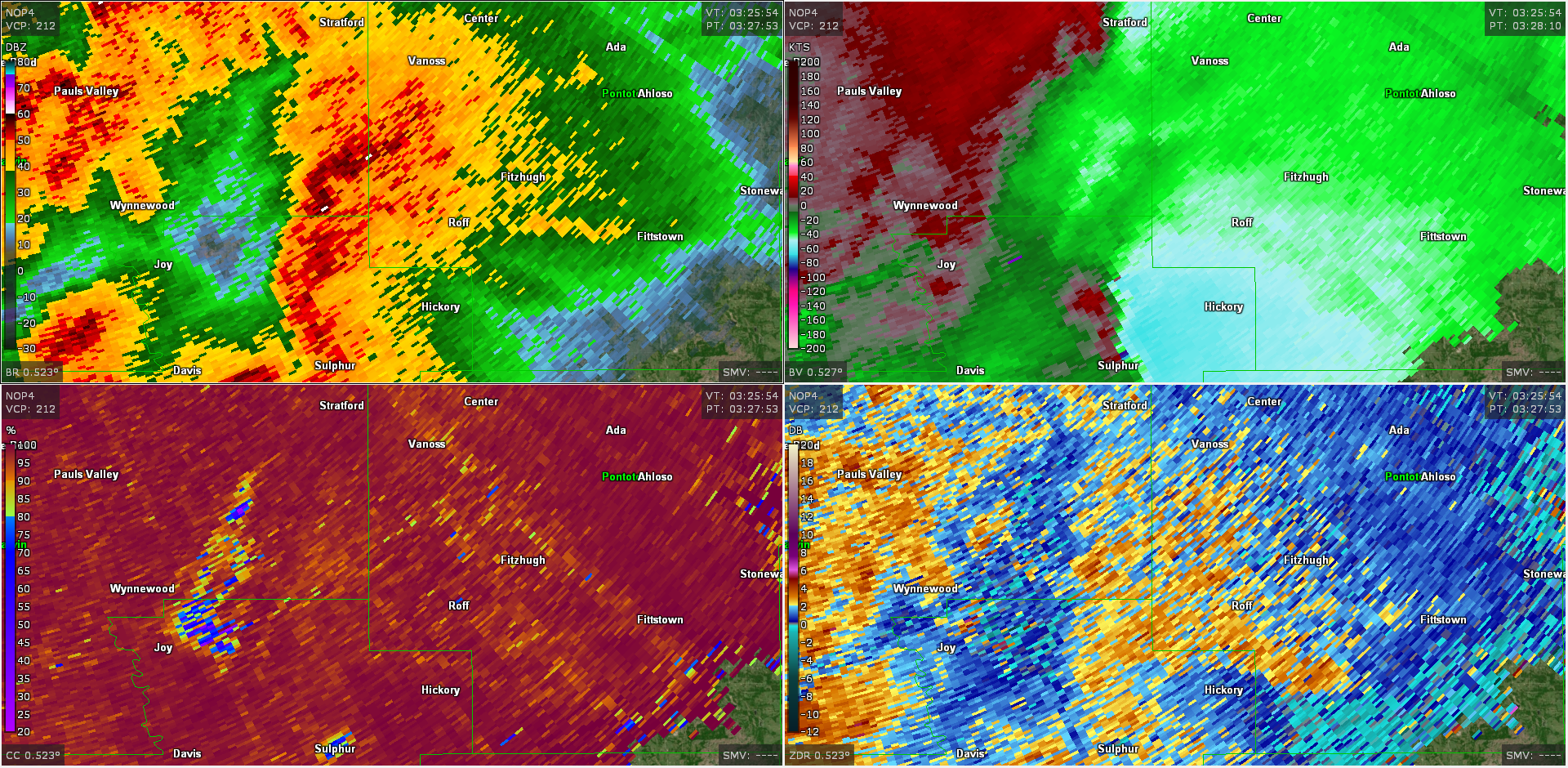
NEXRAD radar scan of the Sulphur, Oklahoma EF3 tornado.

The tornado then rapidly intensified to high-end EF3 strength as it moved into Sulphur. The downtown area was devastated, with many homes, businesses, and historic brick buildings heavily damaged or destroyed, including some that collapsed. Multiple people were injured in residential areas of Sulphur, including two injuries near a laundromat along West Broadway Avenue (SH-7) which was destroyed; the nearby Mary Parker Memorial Library was also heavily damaged. The Artesian Hotel along West 1st Street (US-177) had its roof damaged and an interior wall collapse, although nobody was injured; the nearby Chickasaw Visitor Center sustained heavy damage. The Raina's Sports Bar was destroyed, killing a 63-year-old woman and injuring other people. The nearby Rusty Nail Winery and a brick United States Postal Service building were also destroyed, with an unknown number of people injured. The Rock Creek Apartments sustained severe structural damage, and a 5AM Donuts store along US-177 was heavily damaged. As the Chickasaw Nation Senior Center along East Oklahoma Avenue (SH-7) and multiple other buildings were damaged, a car was thrown onto a roof, and other small structures were damaged. The Sulphur High School sustained minor structural damage, and Sulphur Public School's bus fleet was destroyed. As the weakening, but still intense tornado exited downtown Sulphur, it impacted East June Drive at low-end EF3 intensity, destroying multiple houses. Then tornado then weakened to EF1 intensity as it passed over Tull Crest Lake before impacting Ballpark Road, tossing cars and causing more damage. One or more people were injured here. In total, damage costs in Sulphur have been estimated to be in the range of $5–$10 million.

The tornado then continued northeastward parallel to the Chickasaw Turnpike (SH-301) as it moved over rural, hilly terrain and became rain-wrapped. Along East Palmer Road a home sustained EF1 roof and siding damage and trees were snapped or uprooted at high-end EF1 intensity. The tornado then continued northeastward over open terrain, crossing over the Chickasaw Turnpike, entering Pontotoc County, and snapping trees at high-end EF1 intensity before dissipating southwest of Roff at 10:37 pm CDT.

The tornado tracked 9.91 miles (15.95 km) and reached a peak width of 440 yards (400 m). One person was killed and 30 others were injured. Flash flooding in Sulphur may have been a contributing factor to the casualty toll due to high water levels making it difficult to evacuate. The town's newspaper, the Sulphur Times-Democrat, delayed publication and distribution of its next edition a day because of damage sustained to its newsroom. Damage caused by this tornado was so extreme that rescue efforts were delayed.

=== Spaulding–Holdenville–Bearden, Oklahoma ===
Spaulding–Holdenville–Bearden, Oklahoma
- The tornado as seen north of Holdenville

Meteorological history
- Formed: April 27, 2024, 10:36 p.m. CDT (UTC−05:00)
- Dissipated: April 27, 2024, 11:15 p.m. CDT (UTC−05:00)
- Duration: 39 minutes

EF3 tornado
- on the Enhanced Fujita scale
- Highest winds: 150 mph (240 km/h)

Overall effects
- Fatalities: 2
- Injuries: 4

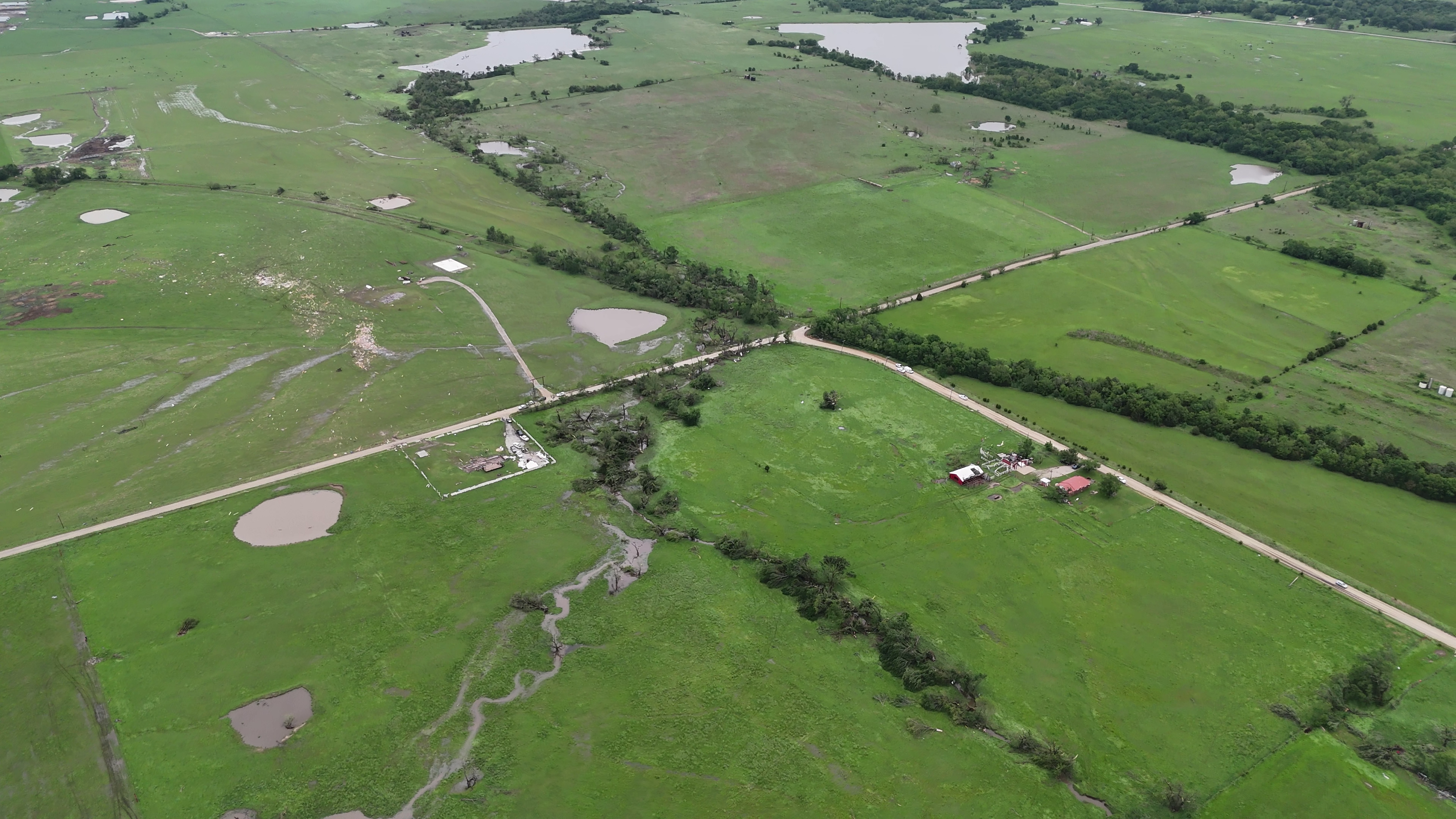
Aerial view of EF3 damage west of Holdenville, Oklahoma

This very large, intense tornado touched down just south of Spaulding at 10:36 pm CDT. After inflicting minor EF0 damage to the roof of a home, the tornado moved due north into Spaulding at EF0 intensity, damaging trees and metal buildings. North of Spaulding, the tornado intensified to EF1 intensity and began to widen significantly, snapping trees and damaging power poles. As it turned due north and crossed Old US 270 west of Holdenville, the tornado heavily damaged outbuildings, inflicted minor roof damage to homes, and snapped more trees. Several more power poles were snapped along US 270 and trees were snapped. By this time, the tornado had grown to its peak width of 1,760 yd (1,610 m) (or 1 mi (1.6 km)) wide and a much larger area of uprooted trees along with damage to a metal building was noted.

After continuing to snap power poles and trees as it turned just slightly east of due north to the northwest of Holdenville, the tornado abruptly intensified to EF3 intensity as it reached County Road E131. Multiple mobile homes and a metal outbuilding were obliterated and swept away, including one mobile home that was left with only its porch and another that was reduced to a bare slab with almost no debris left behind. The very large tornado also snapped nearby trees and damaged other outbuildings. A man was killed in one of the destroyed mobile homes while a four-month-old girl was killed in another. The tornado then continued to track north-northeast at EF2 intensity over open terrain before reaching SH-48 at high-end EF2 intensity, unroofing and knocking down exterior walls of a home, completely destroying a large metal garage, and snapping and debarking trees. Other homes suffered minor roof damage, trees were uprooted, and wooden power poles were snapped as well. Along County Road E125, a trailer was thrown off the road with debris scattered through a field. Snapped wooden power poles were also noted. The tornado then moved over open terrain again, continuing to do EF2 damage, along with additional EF0-EF1 tree damage as it crossed SH-9 while approaching the Okfuskee County line. Right before crossing the county line, the tornado heavily damaged another home at high-end EF2 intensity. The home was completely unroofed and had multiple exterior walls knocked while nearby trees had their tops sheared off.

Upon entering Okfuskee County at high-end EF2 intensity, the tornado shifted a home off its foundation, causing it to collapse, damaged the roof of another home, and uprooted trees. After causing additional EF2 damage as well as damaging the roof of another home and snapping trees at high-end EF1 intensity, the tornado strengthened to low-end EF3 intensity southeast of Bearden, crumpling multiple large metal transmission towers. The tornado then caused EF2 damage to trees along with partially unroofing another home before abruptly weakening and dissipating south of Okemah at 11:15 pm CDT.

The tornado traveled 27.9 miles (44.9 km) and had a peak width of a one mile (1.6 km). Along with the two fatalities, four people were injured.

=== Marietta–Dickson–Baum, Oklahoma ===
Marietta–Dickson–Baum, Oklahoma
- The photo of the tornado impacting the Dollar Tree distribution center west of Marietta.

Meteorological history
- Formed: April 27, 2024, 11:08 p.m. CDT (UTC−05:00)
- Dissipated: April 27, 2024, 11:33 p.m. CDT (UTC−05:00)
- Duration: 25 minutes

EF4 tornado
- on the Enhanced Fujita scale
- Highest winds: 170 mph (270 km/h)

Overall effects
- Fatalities: 1
- Injuries: 6

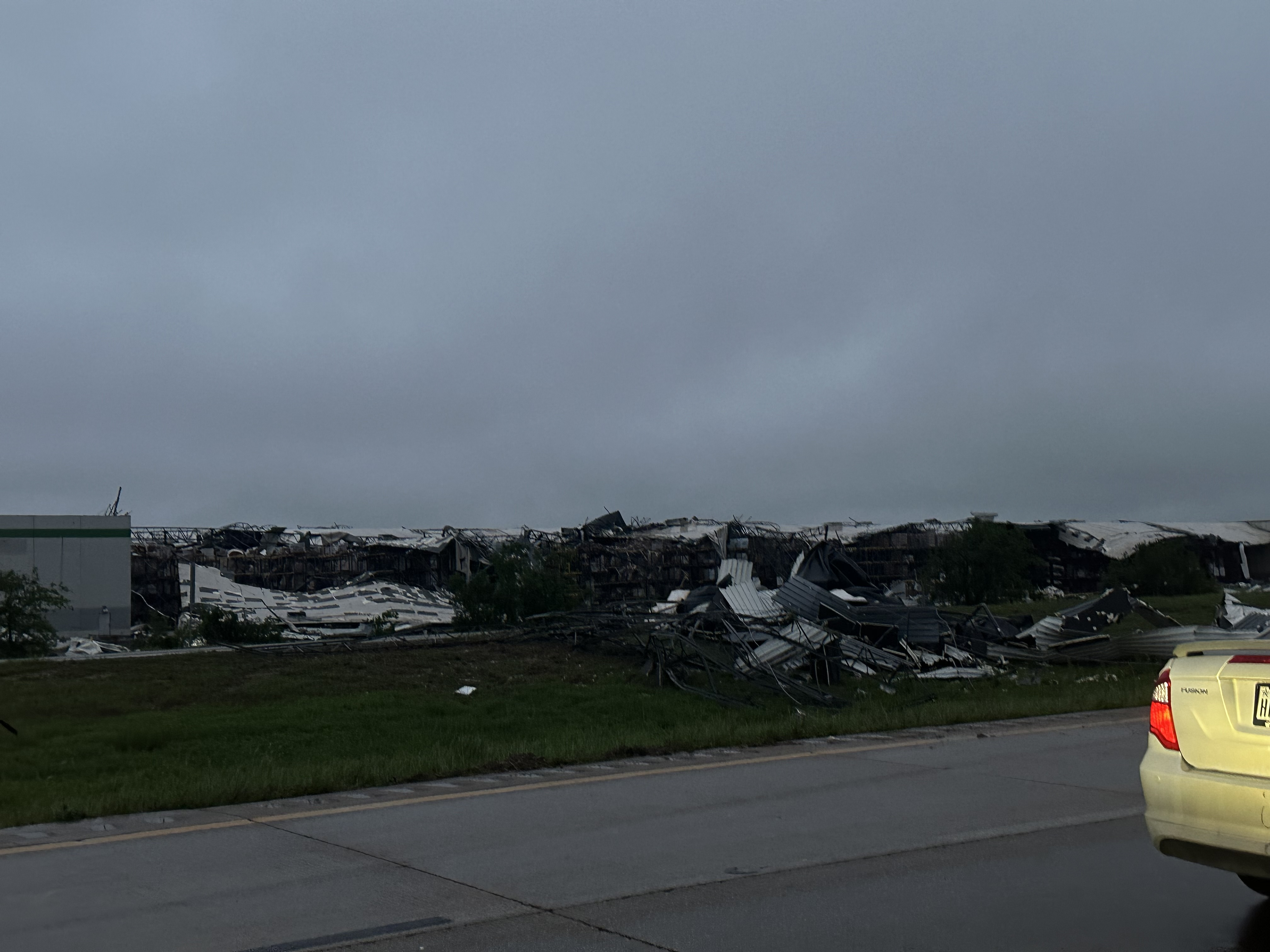
EF3 damage to a Dollar Tree Distribution Center along the west side of I-35 west of Marietta, Oklahoma.

This large, violent tornado developed southwest of Marietta in Love County along Red Oaks Road, damaging trees and the roof of a home at EF0 strength. The tornado quickly intensified as it moved north-northeastward, snapping a power pole along Peanut Road at EF1 intensity before moving over Indian Trails Road at EF2 strength, where a home was unroofed, and trees were heavily damaged. Some other homes suffered minor to moderate roof damage as well. The tornado then intensified to EF3 intensity, inflicting heavy damage to a Dollar Tree Distribution Center facility. The facility was not reopened after the tornado ripped apart a large portion of the center of the structure, destroying the inventory stored there. The tornado then crossed over I-35, overturning a semi-truck on the freeway, and stubbing a tree. The driver of the truck was injured, while the passenger was killed. A gas station canopy at a truck stop was also damaged, and two tractor-trailers were tossed and stacked on top of each other. The tornado then became violent as it crossed over SH-32 and moved into the northwestern part of Marietta at low-end EF4 intensity. A Homeland grocery store was destroyed, with much of its large exterior walls knocked down, large portions of its roofs removed, and its inventory destroyed. The next-door Dollar General was also destroyed at mid-range EF3 intensity, and other structures, including outbuildings and a nursing home, were heavily damaged, and trees were snapped. A large piece of debris from the area landed on I-35 after the tornado passed, narrowly missing a storm chaser on the interstate, and a billboard was blown out. Continuing north-northeastward, the tornado snapped trees at high-end EF2 intensity before exiting Marietta. The tornado then turned almost due north, causing mainly EF1 damage to trees and power poles as it crossed US 77, although one home suffered EF2 roof damage.

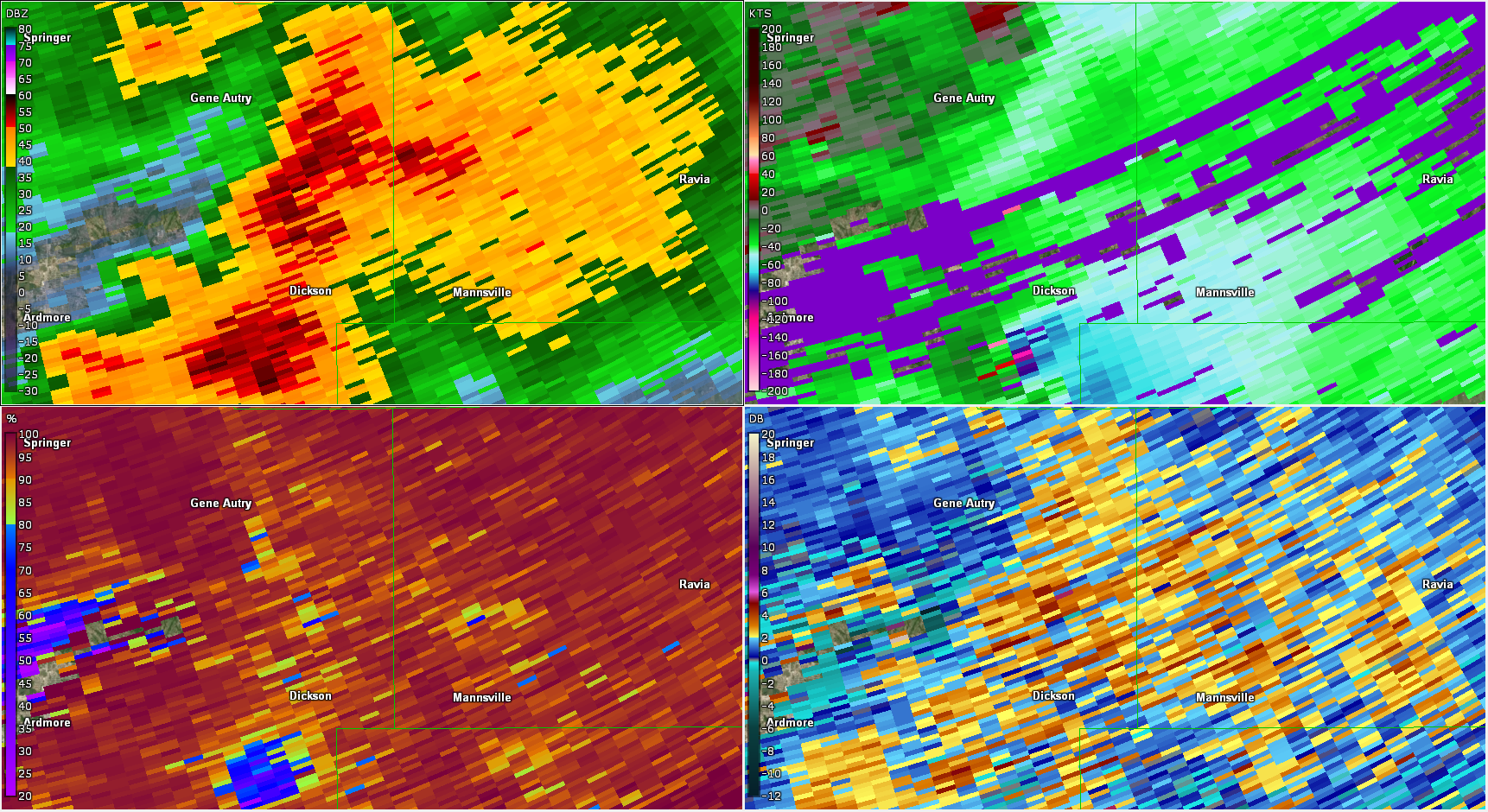
NEXRAD radar scan of the Marietta, Oklahoma EF4 tornado.

Beyond this point, the tornado moved over generally wooded terrain, uprooting or snapping dozens of trees before turning north-northeastward again. It continued to cause EF0-EF1 damage to trees along with EF0 damage to a barn as it paralleled and then crossed SH-32. EF0 tree damage continued as the tornado crossed SH-77S twice as it moved through the southern part of Lake Murray State Park near the dam. The tornado then caused EF1 damage after crossing the southeastern part of Lake Murray, significantly damaging a mobile home, destroying a barn, and snapping trees and power poles as it approached and crossed into Carter County. The tornado then reached EF2 strength as it approached US 70, destroying a mobile home and damaging trees and power poles. The tornado then weakened back to high-end EF1 strength as it crossed over US 70 and continued northeast, mostly causing tree damage, although one mobile home did sustain minor roof damage. It further weakened to EF0 strength as it approached and passed through Dickson with damage limited to trees. North of Dickson, the tornado quickly reached high-end EF1 intensity again, ripping off part of the roof of a home, heavily damaging an outbuilding, rolling a mobile home, and snapping trees. The tornado continued to cause EF0-EF1 tree damage and leaned a power pole as it passed through Baum before dissipating along US 177.

Through its 25-minute lifespan, the tornado traveled 26.8 miles (43.1 km), had a peak width of 900 yards (820 m), killed one person, injured six others, and caused $151 million in damages. This tornado caused the first EF4 damage recorded in the state of Oklahoma since May 9, 2016.

== Non-tornadic effects ==
=== Flooding ===
Numerous roads were forced to close as a result of flooding, including US 77, US 177, and US 266 in Oklahoma, as well as US 54, US 160, and US 400 in Kansas.

== Aftermath ==
On April 26, a disaster declaration was declared in Pottawattamie County, including Minden, by Iowa governor Kim Reynolds. Following major damage, Eppley Airfield in Omaha, Nebraska, was briefly closed, but was re-opened after damage assessments. A curfew was also implemented in Washington County, Nebraska, from 10 pm to 6 am for several days.

Early in the morning of April 28, 2024, Oklahoma governor Kevin Stitt issued a state of emergency in 12 Oklahoma counties due to the large amount of damage and ongoing search and rescue. These include Carter, Cotton, Garfield, Hughes, Kay, Lincoln, Love, Murray, Okfuskee, Oklahoma, Payne and Pontotoc counties. The town of Sulphur, Oklahoma, was heavily damaged, with shops, restaurants and other businesses completely destroyed.Sulphur Public Schools have also been closed as a result of the damage sustained to the high school during the tornado, and many school buses were put out of service.

Chickasaw National Recreation Area closed indefinitely following a tornado. The park was mostly reopened by May 23.

=== Power outages ===
I-35 near the Texas border line was also briefly closed due to downed power lines and overturned vehicles. There were more than 29,000 power outages across Texas, and nearly 11,000 power outages occurred across Nebraska, including nearly 10,000 across the Lincoln, Nebraska area. Flooding also injured one person in Everman, Texas. One person was injured when a tree fell on a residence in State Line, Arkansas.

== See also ==
- List of North American tornadoes and tornado outbreaks
- Weather of 2024
- List of United States tornadoes in April 2024
- List of F4 and EF4 tornadoes (2020–present)
- Research on tornadoes in 2024
- 2011 Super Outbreak, a record-breaking tornado outbreak which occurred on the same calendar dates exactly 13 years prior
