= 2024 Sulphur tornado =

Tornado in Oklahoma, U.S.

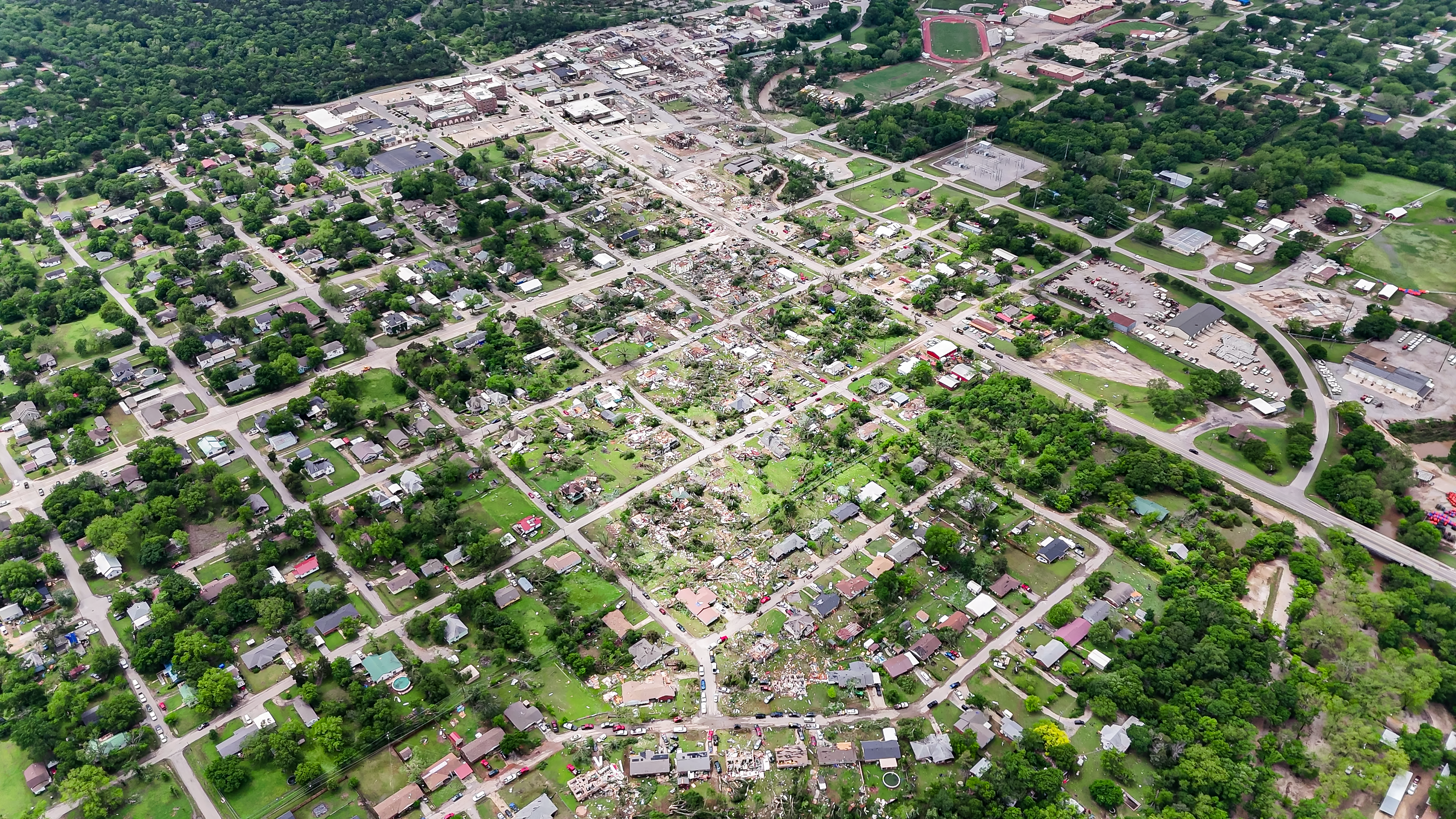
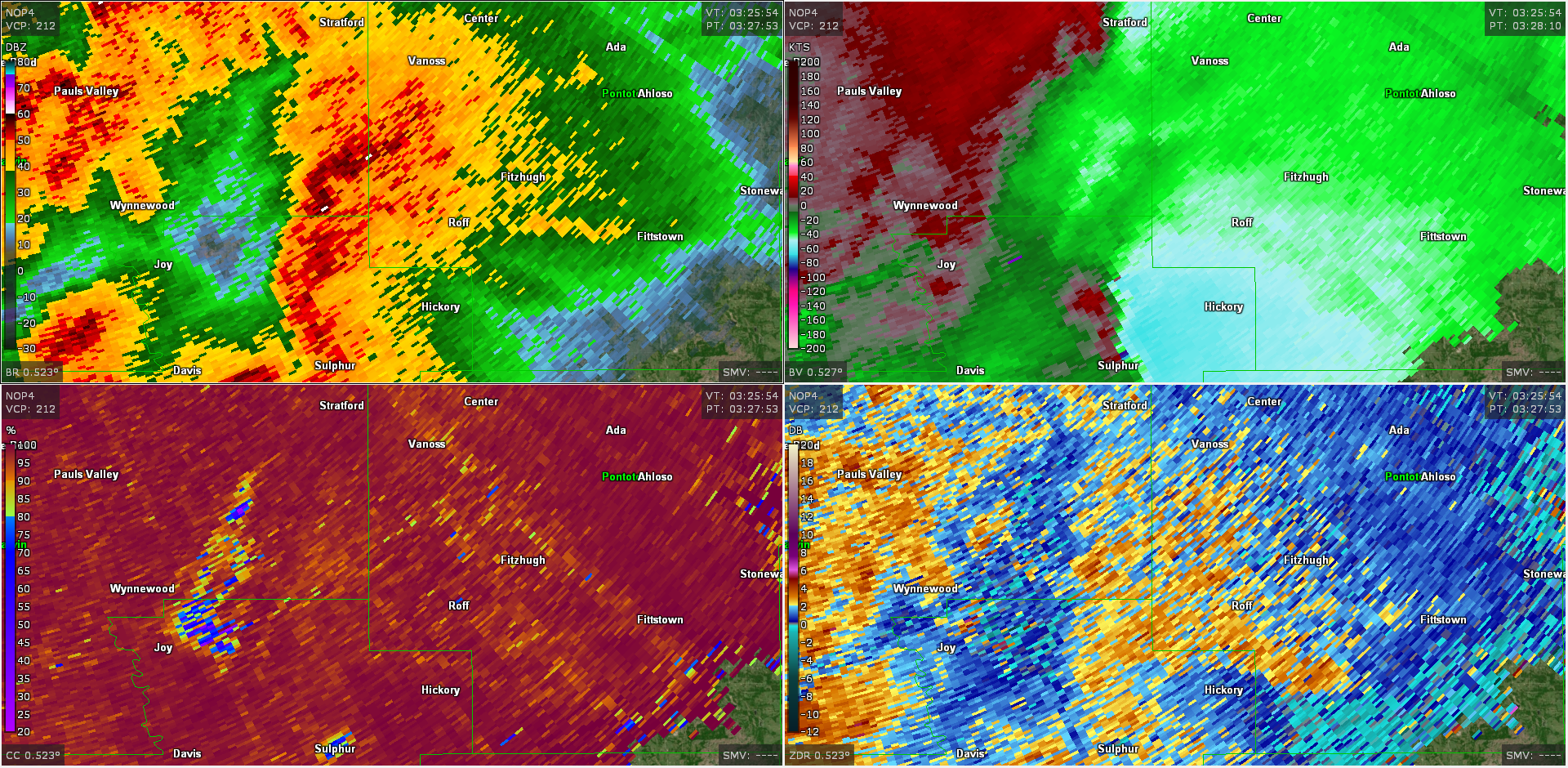
- Clockwise from Top: The tornado illuminated by a power flash as it was in downtown Sulphur. NEXRAD radar scan of the Sulphur, Oklahoma EF3 tornado. Aerial view of significant damage in downtown Sulphur.

Meteorological history
- Formed: April 27, 2024, 10:23 p.m. CDT (UTC−05:00)
- Dissipated: April 27, 2024, 10:37 p.m. CDT (UTC−05:00)
- Duration: 14 minutes

EF3 tornado
- on the Enhanced Fujita scale
- Highest winds: 165 mph (266 km/h)

Overall effects
- Fatalities: 1
- Injuries: 30
- Damage: $10 million (2024 USD)
- Areas affected: Sulphur, Oklahoma
- Part of the Tornado outbreak of April 25–28, 2024 and Tornadoes of 2024

In the late evening hours of April 27, 2024, a strong and destructive EF3-rated tornado moved through the community of Sulphur, located in the state of Oklahoma. The tornado, known as the Sulphur tornado, was part of a larger tornado outbreak across the United States in late-April 2024. The tornado killed one person in Sulphur and injured thirty others along a 9.9-mile (15.9 km) path, while producing heavy damage within the city limits of Sulphur. The tornado inflicted damage that would later be determined to total in excess of $10 million (2024 USD).

The tornado touched down within the bounds of the Chickasaw National Recreation Area shortly before 10:20 p.m., (Note: For consistency, all times in the article are displayed in Central Daylight Time (CDT) unless stated otherwise.) tracking towards Sulphur while slowly strengthening. The tornado would reach EF3 intensity as it entered into the southern portions of the town, heavily damaging buildings and killing one person who was sheltering inside a sports lounge. The tornado damaged over 75 buildings and businesses in Sulphur before leaving the town; over thirty more people were injured in residential areas located in the northern portions of the town. The tornado weakened as it left the city limits of Sulphur, dissipating 14 minutes after touching down. The tornado reached a peak width of 440 yards (400 m), and retained peak estimated wind speeds of approximately 165 miles per hour (266 km/h).

== Meteorological synopsis ==
Multiple tornadic supercells developed ahead of the main line of storms on April 28, and multiple large, intense tornadoes were confirmed in south and eastern Oklahoma, causing significant damage and prompting new tornado warnings with attached Particularly Dangerous Situation (PDS) tags for the towns of Ardmore, Holdenville, Marietta, Okemah, and Sulphur. A total of 23 PDS tornado warnings were issued as the intense storms caused damage. The areas around Sulphur were heavily monitored, and a hook was visible on radar at approximately midnight. Shortly before this storm became tornadic, the SPC issued a mesoscale discussion 0555 highlighting the potential for strong tornadoes due to SRH values near 600 m^{2}/s^{2}.

The 00:00 UTC upper-air sounding from Norman, Oklahoma, depicted very strong shear, with storm-relative helicity in the 0–3 kilometer layer of 400 m^{2}/s^{2} and mixed-layer CAPE of around 2300 J/kg. As the lower-level jet further increased 0-1km SRH was observed at 600 m^{2}/s^{2} which is unusually intense. Over the course of the successive hours, new tornadic supercells developed ahead of the main squall line and produced multiple large and intense tornadoes in southern and eastern Oklahoma. These tornadoes caused significant damage and prompted PDS tornado warnings for the towns of Ardmore, Holdenville, Marietta, and Okemah.

Before the tornado touched down, five simultaneous tornado warnings were active over Sulphur, Gene Autry, Mill Creek, Roff, Springer, and Hickory. Three of these warnings had attached PDS tags, two of which included Sulphur.

== Tornado summary ==
The tornado first touched down to the northwest of Centennial Boulevard, snapping trees at EF1 intensity before crossing Wilson Lake in the Chickasaw National Recreation Area. The tornado inflicted EF0-rated damage to trees along Veterans Lake Road before rapidly intensifying as it entered downtown Sulphur. The tornado deroofed numerous homes at EF2 intensity along West Tishomingo Avenue; more trees were damaged at low intensity as the tornado continued to move to the northeast. The edge of the tornado, which now retained wind speeds estimated to have been as high as 143 mph (230 km/h), moved over the Mary Parker Memorial Library, which temporarily closed following the tornado.

Intensity map of the tornado as it moved through Sulphur. (Note: Due to a software error, EF0 damage lines are not visible.) Key EF1 86–110 mph EF2 111–135 mph EF3 136–165 mph

The tornado first reached EF3 intensity to the south of SH-7, before destroying a strip mall located along West 3rd Street. The tornado would claim the life of one person as it struck Raina's Sports Lounge on West Muskogee Avenue, causing the building's roof to collapse onto patrons, trapping several. At least twelve people were in the lounge when the tornado hit. Several other businesses, including The Mix Mercantile, J.J.'s Furniture and a Rusty Nails restaurant. The tornado would continue to produce EF3 damage as it moved through downtown portions of Sulphur, shifting an entire home off its foundation along Marietta Avenue and deroofing a three-story apartment complex. In the downtown area of Sulphur, approximately 72 businesses were damaged or destroyed by the tornado.

It immediately began to move northeastward in the direction of downtown Sulphur. The tornado directly impacted West 1st Street (US-177), slightly damaging The Artesian Hotel, causing the collapse of an interior wall and roof damage. Nobody was injured. The Chickasaw Visitor Center and the Mary Parker Memorial Library were both heavily damaged as the tornado began to track into the downtown area. The tornado hit West Muskogee Avenue almost instantly after entering downtown Sulphur, destroying Raina's Sports Bar, killing one person and injuring multiple other people. After, the tornado crossed the street and impacted the Rusty Nails restaurant, which was then also destroyed. A brick USPS building was destroyed on West Venita Avenue, and an unknown number of people were injured. It tracked through multiple other streets, destroying many brick-clad buildings and throwing cars. The Rock Creek Apartments were heavily damaged, and a 5 AM Donuts store was heavily damaged.

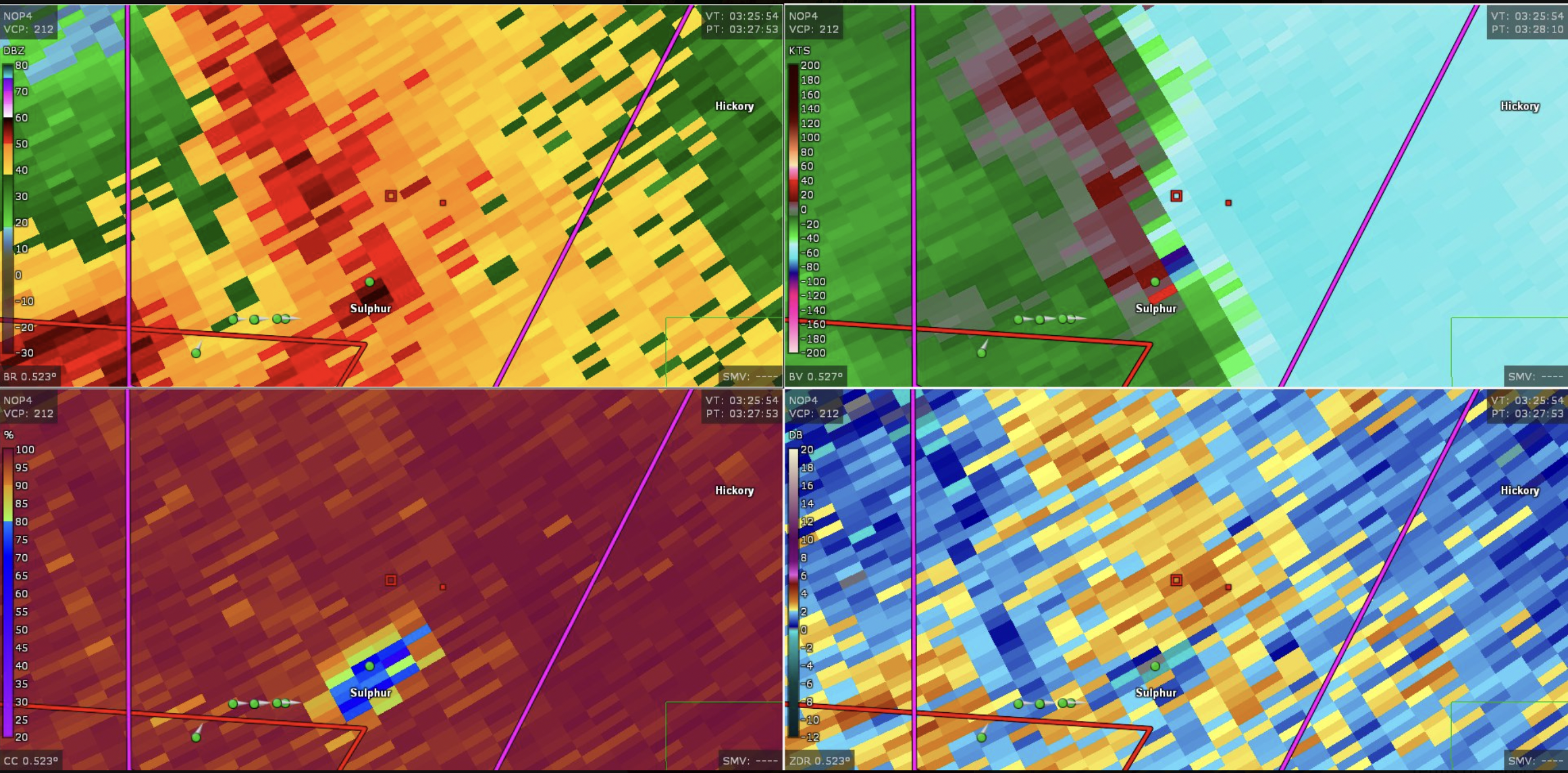
Radar imagery of the tornado near Sulphur. At this point, the tornado attained a tornadic debris signature.

The Chickasaw Nation Senior Center along East Oklahoma Avenue (SH-7) nearby and multiple other buildings were damaged, and a car was thrown onto a roof. The tornado then crossed East Tulsa Avenue, debarking trees and causing damage to small structures. It left downtown Sulphur, impacting East June Avenue and Hickory Street, destroying multiple houses. The tornado then curved upward, narrowly missing Tull Crest Lake, before impacting Ball Park Road, tossing cars and causing more damage. One or more people were injured here. It tracked through uninhabited hills before impacting the Platte Valley Trolley Railway, destroying the rails. It narrowly missed Petty Road, and curved upward, hitting Koller Road and East 1700 Road. It again began to track through open hills, damaging trees and adopting a rain-wrapped shape, making it virtually invisible. It almost directly hit Cochran Creek, but moved slightly upward, instead hitting East Palmer Road at an unknown intensity.

As the tornado tracked through hills, it again came within close proximity of Cochran Creek, but this time directly hit it at an unknown intensity. It crossed the creek three more times as it tracked close to Hickory. It then impacted the Chickasaw Turnpike (SH-301). It also hit County Road 1670 at unknown intensities and narrowly missed Boss Road. As it tracked toward Hickory, it started to rapidly lose speed and velocity, and eventually began to rope out while still moving in a straight line northeastward, and eventually completely dissipated, at around 10:37 p.m.; one person was killed along the tornado's 9.9-mile (15.9 km) path.

== Aftermath ==
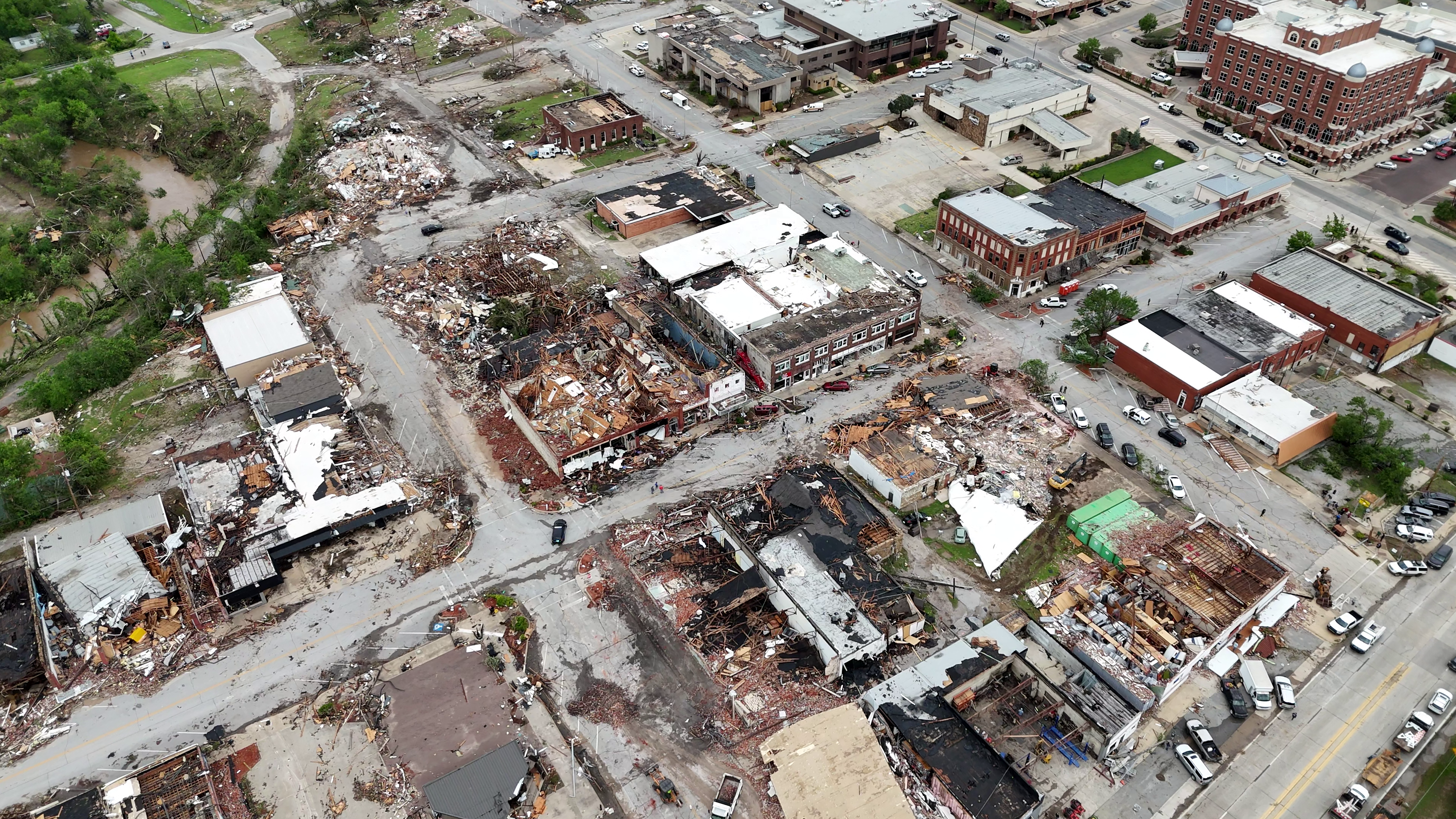
Significant damage in downtown Sulphur produced by the tornado

A few hours after the tornado, on April 28, Oklahoma Governor Kevin Stitt issued a state of emergency in twelve Oklahoma counties due to the large amount of damage and to aid search and rescue efforts. Counties declared under a state of emergency included Carter, Cotton, Garfield, Hughes, Kay, Lincoln, Love, Murray, Okfuskee, Oklahoma, Payne, and Pontotoc. Aid and disaster response supplies were sent to Sulphur, and rescue operations were conducted in the weeks following the tornado. Deanne Criswell, administrator of the Federal Emergency Management Agency at the time of the tornado, surveyed tornado damage in Sulphur on May 1. The Sulphur Recovery Task Force was set up following the tornado to help rebuild the town.

Following the tornado, emergency management agencies blocked off access to downtown Sulphur due to the instability of several buildings in the area and concerns over looting. Sulphur Public Schools were as a result of the damage sustained to the high school during the tornado, and many school buses were put out of service.

Much of downtown Sulphur sustained significant damage, including Sulphur High School, which sustained minor structural damage, and Sulphur Public School's bus fleet, which was destroyed. Roads were damaged or destroyed, and multiple brick buildings collapsed at EF3 intensity. The town's newspaper, the Sulphur Times-Democrat, delayed the release of its paper a day due to damage to its newsroom.Many residences suffered major damage, and the Rock Creek Apartments located at 1021 West 2nd Street sustained severe structural damage. In total, damage costs have been estimated to excess of $10 million (2024 USD). Two historic buildings in downtown Sulphur, the Log Cabin Theater and the Hassen Building both sustained damage from the tornado.

=== Casualties ===
This tornado killed one person and injured 30 others. Damage caused by this tornado was so extreme that rescue efforts were delayed. Sheila Goodman, who was visiting Raina's Sports Lounge, was killed when the building took a direct hit and collapsed. Multiple people were injured in residential areas of Sulphur, including two people near a laundromat which was destroyed. Flash flooding in Sulphur immediately following the event stunted recovery efforts.

Name	Age	Location of death	City	Refs.
Sheila Hilliard Goodman	63	201 West Muskogee Avenue	Sulphur	

== See also ==
- 2023 Pasadena–Deer Park tornado, tornado of similar size and intensity
- 2016 Davis-Sulphur-Roff tornado, tornado of the same strength which affected Sulphur 8 years earlier
- List of F3, EF3, and IF3 tornadoes (2020–present)
