= Shiloh, Arkansas =

Shiloh, Arkansas may refer to the following places in the United States:

- Shiloh, Columbia County, Arkansas, in Arkansas
- Shiloh, Howard County, Arkansas, in Arkansas
- Shiloh, Lafayette County, Arkansas, in Arkansas
- Shiloh, Pope County, Arkansas
