= Murder of Connie Franklin =

1929 murder trial

Connie Franklin (c. 1896–1932) was an American man who became widely known in the United States for testifying at his own murder trial in 1929. Franklin was known in the popular press as the "Arkansas Ghost".

== Background ==
In January 1929, Connie Franklin moved to the town of St. James in Stone County, Arkansas. At the time, he claimed to be 22 years old, and worked cutting timber and as a farm hand. Soon after his arrival in the area he began courting a local 16-year-old girl, surname Ruminer, whose given name is reported variously as Tillar, Tillir, Tiller, and Tillie. In March 1929, Franklin disappeared. After an investigation, Sheriff Sam Johnson presented Bertha Burns and Tillar Ruminer as his evidence to a grand jury, but as there were at that time no witnesses willing to testify, the Grand Jury took no action in the case.

In the fall of 1929 Bertha Burns, who had found the bloody hat that supposedly belonged to Franklin back in the Spring, contacted Johnson and brought him to a pit of ashes not far from her home, claiming that there might be the evidence of Franklin's murder in the pit. Johnson found some bone fragments and teeth, which he took to the Arkansas state health officer, Dr. C. W. Garrison, who determined that at least one of the shards came from a human skull.

Some months after Franklin's disappearance, Johnson intercepted a note which provided him with some information about the case, and he renewed his efforts to find witnesses. Ruminer had told the Sheriff in May 1929 that she and Franklin had been attacked by "night riders" on March 9, 1929. She explained that she and Franklin had intended to marry, and en route to the Justice of the Peace they had been attacked by four men; Hubert Hester, Herman Greenway, Joe White and Bill Younger. According to her statements, Hester and Greenway had taken her into the woods and raped her, while the others had tortured, mutilated, and then burned Franklin alive. When Ruminer was questioned about her delay in reporting these crimes, she said that she had kept quiet due to the violence inflicted upon her and the threats of further violence made against her: "One of the attackers threatened to kill her, whipped her father and mother, carried away her brother as a hostage." Without bones, or witnesses, they could not issue arrest warrants. On November 18, 1929, the Grand Jury issued indictments for first degree murder for Alex Fulks, Joe White, Herman Greenway, Hubert Hester, and Bill C. Younger following the discovery by Bertha Burns of a fire pit and bones near her home, eight and a half months after the alleged crime. A trial date was set for December 17.

== Connie Franklin returns ==
On December 5, the Arkansas Gazette ran a headline claiming that Connie Franklin had been seen alive after the supposed murder. A farmer, Elmer Wingo, reported that Franklin had worked for him and for his neighbors, the Philpotts, as a farm hand, and that he had passed through the area in March 1929 looking for work. Shortly after his return to Saint James, however, the case was further complicated when Johnson discovered that the man claiming to be Connie Franklin was actually Marion Franklin Rogers, who had a wife and was the father of three or four children. Further investigation revealed that in 1926 Rogers had been admitted to the State Hospital for Nervous Diseases, whence he had escaped three months later. Two days after this story broke, Rogers was found at a farm belonging to Murry Bryant near Humphrey, 100 miles to the south, and subsequently brought back to Saint James. There, Rogers was examined and questioned by those who had known Franklin. Coleman Foster, a cousin to Tillar Ruminer and a friend of Franklin asserted that Rogers was not Franklin. Ruminer and her father also denied that Rogers was the same person as Franklin, at first hesitantly, and then more assertively during the trial. But Rogers was able to identify Ruminer and her father, while others in the community, including the accused men, asserted that Franklin and Rogers were the same person.

Unable to find any witnesses to Franklin's identity who did not have an interest in the case, the prosecutor decided that a trial was the only method of resolving the issue. A grand jury was convened at the same time to establish the identity of Rogers. Doctor J.E. Luther confirmed he was the same man through comparison of his military and state hospital records and first hand examination.

During the trial, prosecuting attorney Hugh Williamson was opposed by Ben Williamson, his younger brother, acting as chief defense counsel. Judge S. M. Bone presided. The prosecution submitted burned bones as evidence of Franklin's death, but as a temple bone had been mislaid, the state health officer Garrison refused to swear that the remains were human. In addition, both Garrison and a dentist testified that the teeth found at the site were not human. Ruminer testified that Rogers was not the same man as Connie Franklin, and recounted her version of the events of March 9. Her testimony was corroborated by a deaf mute, Reuben Harrell, a nephew to Coleman Foster, who had come forward as a witness to the crimes.

The defense presented witnesses who claimed that Rogers and Franklin were the same person. During his testimony, Rogers claimed that he had been out drinking with the defendants on the day of the "murder", fallen off his mule, and had not seen Ruminer until the following day. At that point, he claimed, Ruminer had said she wanted to postpone the wedding until the fall, to which he replied that if she didn't marry him immediately she would never see him again. She would not, so he left town and worked in nearby Humphrey, Arkansas, not to return until he heard that others were on trial for his murder. He made efforts to explain the story had its roots in the liquor wars between the Hess family and the Younger and Greenways. The defense also claimed that enemies of the accused had used Franklin's disappearance to frame them for murder, including placing animal bones in a fire in the woods. In the end, the trial lasted two days.

Initially, the jury reported they were deadlocked. Judge S. M. Bone told the jury that the trial had already cost the county $8000 and instructed them to try again to come to a verdict. The next day, they returned a verdict of "not guilty."

== Afterward ==
In December 1932, three years after the trial, Rogers was found lying beside a road outside Clarendon and died of exposure three days later. Medical reports showed he had appendicitis.
