= Pinky Pruitt Barn =

- U.S. National Register of Historic Places
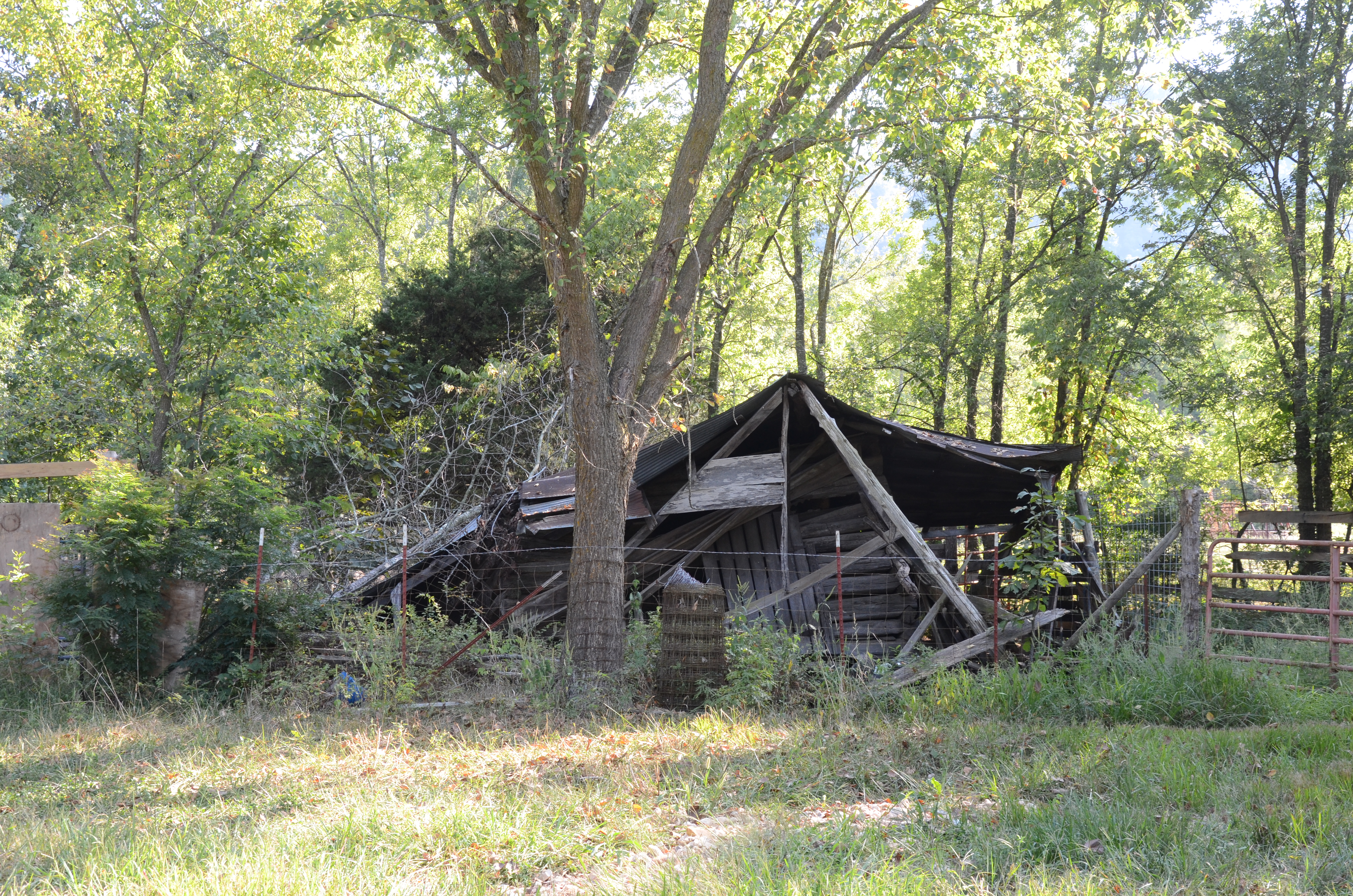
- All that remains of the barn as of September, 2015

- Location within Arkansas Location within the United States
- Location: AR 14, St. James, Arkansas
- Coordinates: 35°50′17″N 91°56′7″W
- Area: less than one acre
- Built: 1890
- Architectural style: Single Crib plan
- MPS: Stone County MRA
- NRHP reference No.: 85002239
- Added to NRHP: September 17, 1985

The Pinky Pruitt Barn is a historic barn on the south side of Arkansas Highway 14, just west of St. James, Arkansas. It is a single-crib structure 1 1/2 stories in height, built out of rough-hewn logs, with a stone pier foundation. It is surrounded on three sides by open sheds supported by log posts. It was built about 1890, and is reflective of the earliest form of barn built in Stone County by arriving settlers.

The barn was listed on the National Register of Historic Places in 1985.

== See also ==
- National Register of Historic Places listings in Stone County, Arkansas
