= Shady Grove, Tennessee =

Shady Grove, Tennessee may refer to the following places in Tennessee:

- Shady Grove, Coffee County, Tennessee
- Shady Grove, Crockett County, Tennessee
- Shady Grove, Franklin County, Tennessee
- Shady Grove, Hamilton County, Tennessee
- Shady Grove, Hardin County, Tennessee
- Shady Grove, Hickman County, Tennessee
- Shady Grove, Jackson County, Tennessee
- Shady Grove, Jefferson County, Tennessee
- Shady Grove, Knox County, Tennessee
- Shady Grove, Lawrence County, Tennessee
- Shady Grove, Lincoln County, Tennessee
- Shady Grove, Montgomery County, Tennessee
- Shady Grove, Morgan County, Tennessee
- Shady Grove, Putnam County, Tennessee
- Shady Grove, Sevier County, Tennessee
- Shady Grove, Trousdale County, Tennessee
- Shady Grove, White County, Tennessee
