= Sulphur Springs, Johnson County, Arkansas =

Unincorporated community in Johnson County, Arkansas, United States

Sulphur Springs, Arkansas
- Unincorporated community
- Location within Arkansas Location within the United States
- Coordinates: 35°28′39″N 93°33′51″W
- Country: United States
- State: Arkansas
- County: Johnson
- Elevation: 495 ft (151 m)
- Time zone: UTC-6 (Central (CST))
  - Summer (DST): UTC-5 (CDT)
- Area code: 479
- GNIS feature ID: 57197

Sulphur Springs is an unincorporated community in Johnson County, Arkansas, United States. Sulphur Springs is located along Arkansas Highway 352, 5.5 miles (8.9 km) west of Clarksville.
