= Simpson, Arkansas =

- Unincorporated community
- Position in Arkansas
- Coordinates: 35°36′26″N 93°03′58″W
- Country: United States
- State: Arkansas
- County: Pope
- Elevation: 1,863 ft (568 m)
- Time zone: UTC-6 (Central (CST))
  - Summer (DST): UTC-5 (CDT)
- GNIS feature ID: 73583

Simpson is an unincorporated community in the Ozark National Forest, Pope County, Arkansas, United States.
