= Shady Grove, Texas =

Shady Grove may refer to:

- Shady Grove, Angelina County, Texas
- Shady Grove (restaurant), Austin
- Shady Grove, Burnet County, Texas
- Shady Grove, Cherokee County, Texas
- Shady Grove, Cooke County, Texas
- Shady Grove, Dallas County, Texas
- Shady Grove, Fannin County, Texas
- Shady Grove, Houston County, Texas
- Shady Grove, Kerr County, Texas
- Shady Grove, Nacogdoches County, Texas
- Shady Grove, Panola County, Texas
- Shady Grove, Rains County, Texas
- Shady Grove, Smith County, Texas
- Shady Grove, Upshur County, Texas
