= Schaberg, Arkansas =

Coordinates: 35.72730°N 94.16965°W

Schaberg is an unincorporated community in Crawford County, in the U.S. state of Arkansas.

== History ==
Variant names were "Frisco", "Porter" and "Porter Station". The town site was platted as "Porter" in 1885, soon after the St. Louis–San Francisco Railway was extended to that point. A post office called Frisco was established in 1883, the name was changed to Schaberg in 1912, and the post office closed in 1950.
