= Sulphur Times Democrat =

Newspaper

Sulphur Times-Democrat
- Type: Weekly newspaper
- Format: Broadsheet
- Owner(s): James and Kathy John
- Editor: James John
- Headquarters: Sulphur, Oklahoma
- Circulation: 4,000
- OCLC number: 31725672
- Website: sulphurtimes.com

The Sulphur Times-Democrat is a weekly newspaper based in Sulphur, Oklahoma. serving Murray County and surrounding communities in south-central Oklahoma. Since its founding in 1927, the newspaper has reported on local government, schools, community events, and regional news affecting residents of Sulphur, Davis, and nearby rural areas. The newspaper is currently owned and edited by James John.

On April 27, 2024, a tornado struck Sulphur, Oklahoma, causing damage throughout the city. The Sulphur Times-Democrat newsroom sustained damage during the storm. The newspaper continued publishing and covering the recovery efforts from the Johns' kitchen.
