= Shady Grove, Missouri =

Shady Grove, Missouri may refer to:

- Shady Grove, Dallas County, Missouri
- Shady Grove, Pulaski County, Missouri
