= Shady Grove, Lawrence County, Tennessee =

Shady Grove, Tennessee
- Ghost town
- Location within Tennessee Location within the United States
- Coordinates: 35°07′55″N 87°16′50″W
- Country: United States
- State: Tennessee
- County: Lawrence
- Elevation: 814 ft (248 m)
- GNIS feature ID: 1303055

Shady Grove is a ghost town in Lawrence County, Tennessee, United States. Shady Grove was 8.2 miles (13.2 km) south-southeast of Lawrenceburg. It appeared on USGS maps as late as 1936.
