= Shady Grove, Washington County, Arkansas =

Shady Grove, Arkansas
- Unincorporated community
- Shady Grove's position in Arkansas Shady Grove, Arkansas (the United States)
- Coordinates: 36°08′44″N 94°08′39″W
- Country: United States
- State: Arkansas
- County: Washington
- Township: Springdale
- Elevation: 1,260 ft (384 m)
- Time zone: UTC-6 (Central (CST))
  - Summer (DST): UTC-5 (CDT)
- ZIP code: 72764
- Area code: 479
- GNIS feature ID: 65442

Shady Grove is an unincorporated community in Springdale Township, Washington County, Arkansas, United States. It is located in south Springdale, just northwest of Lake Fayetteville.
