= The Artesian Hotel =

Hotel in Sulphur, Oklahoma

The Artesian Hotel, Casino and Spa
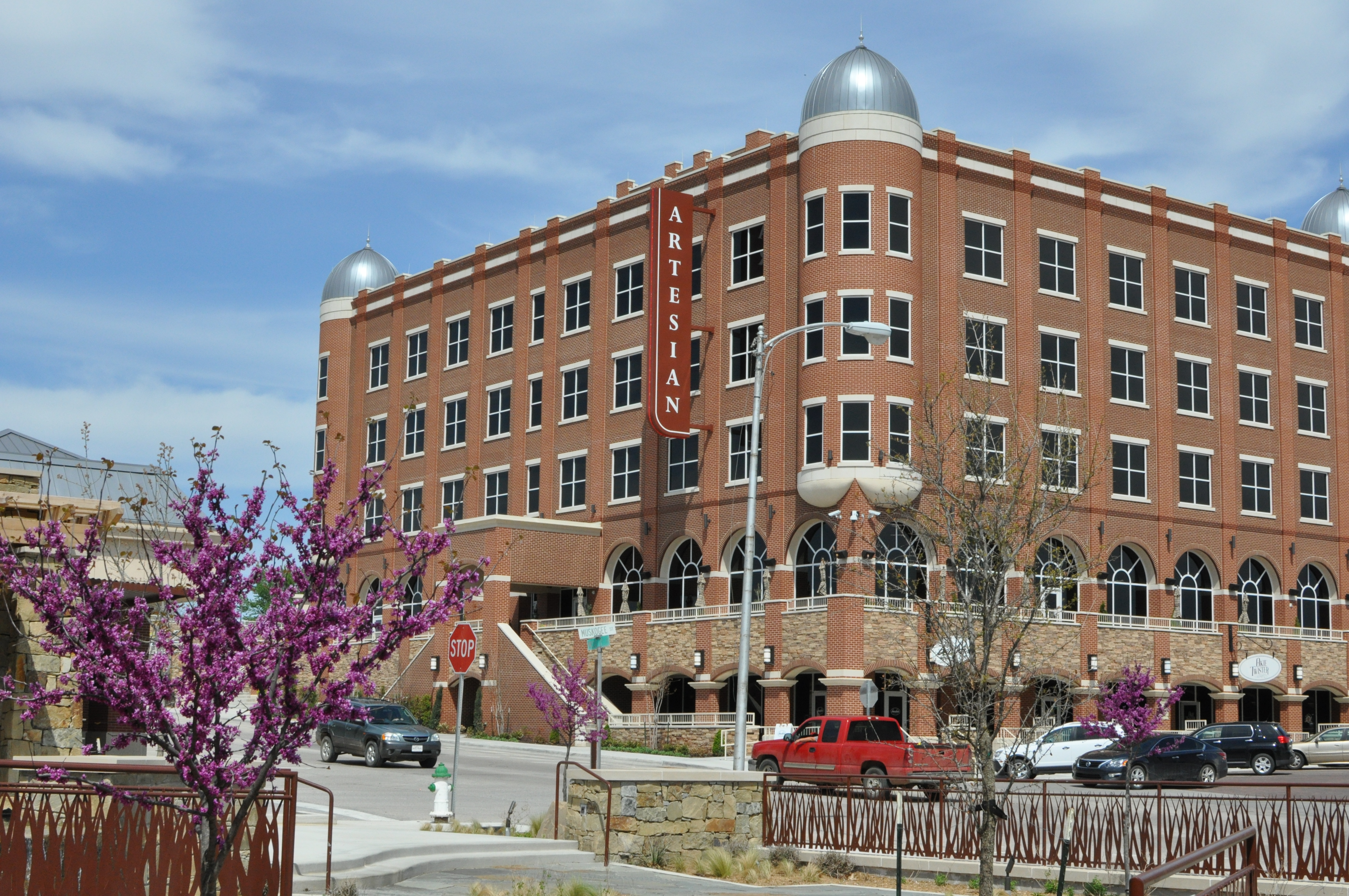
- Artesian Hotel with redbud tree in Sulphur
- Interactive map of the The Artesian Hotel, Casino and Spa area

General information
- Location: Sulphur, Oklahoma, 1001 W 1st St, Sulphur, Oklahoma
- Coordinates: 34.5075°N 96.9681°W
- Opening: 1906 (Original) Friday, August 2, 2013 – Rebuilt
- Closed: 1962 – Hotel destroyed by fire
- Owner: The Chickasaw Nation
- Management: The Chickasaw Nation

Technical details
- Floor count: 4

Other information
- Number of rooms: 81
- Number of suites: 4
- Number of restaurants: 1
- Number of bars: 2 (Hotel has 1, Casino has 1)
- Parking: parking garage

Website
- artesianhotel.com

The Artesian Hotel, Casino and Spa is a hotel in Sulphur, Oklahoma. Amenities include a casino, swimming pool, fitness center, and spa.

== History ==
The original hotel was built in 1906 using bricks from the Bland Hotel and decorated with furniture from the St. Louis World's Fair. It was a four-story brick building, and contained the town's only elevator. The architects J.M. Bayless and C.J. Webster named it the Artesian after an artesian well was discovered during construction. Carrie Nation, William Howard Taft, William H. Murray, Roy J. Turner and John Wayne all stayed at the hotel. It served as a summer residence for Oklahoma's first governor Charles N. Haskell. The original building was destroyed by fire in 1962 and replaced in 1965 by a plain 72 unit building constructed at a cost of a half-million dollars. The new building was named The Artesian Motor Hotel.

=== History with the Chickasaw Nation ===
In 1972, The Artesian Motor Hotel was on the verge of bankruptcy and was purchased at auction by the Chickasaw Nation, which remodeled it and renamed it the Chickasaw Motor Inn. The Chickasaw Motor Inn served as the tribal headquarters from 1972 until 1977, when the Chickasaw Nation built its current tribal headquarters in Ada, Oklahoma. Groundbreaking on the newest building, modeled after the 1906 hotel, was held on October 14, 2010.
