= State Line, Arkansas =

Unincorporated community in Arkansas, US

Coordinates: 33°03′05″N 093°32′21″W

State Line is an unincorporated community in Lafayette County, Arkansas, United States.
