= St. James, Arkansas =

- Unincorporated community
- Location within Arkansas Location within the United States
- Coordinates: 35°50′18″N 91°55′05″W
- Country: United States
- State: Arkansas
- County: Stone
- Elevation: 577 ft (176 m)
- Time zone: UTC-6 (Central (CST))
  - Summer (DST): UTC-5 (CDT)
- Area code: 870
- GNIS feature ID: 58570

St. James is an unincorporated community in Stone County, Arkansas, United States. St. James is located on Arkansas Highway 14, 11.4 miles (18.3 km) east of Mountain View. The Pinky Pruitt Barn, which is listed on the National Register of Historic Places, is located in St. James.
