= Shiloh, Pope County, Arkansas =

Shiloh, Arkansas
- Populated Area
- Position in Arkansas
- Coordinates: 35°19′07″N 93°08′09″W
- Country: United States
- State: Arkansas
- County: Pope
- City: Russellville
- Elevation: 354 ft (108 m)
- Time zone: UTC-6 (Central (CST))
  - Summer (DST): UTC-5 (CDT)
- GNIS feature ID: 62079

Shiloh is a populated area that lies partly in Russellville and partly in unincorporated Pope County, Arkansas, United States. It is located between Interstate 40 and Dover on Arkansas Highway 7.

Shiloh, as a populated place, is one of the oldest in Pope County with Shiloh Cumberland Presbyterian Church established in the 1830s on Shiloh Creek at what was known as the Williamson (or, later, Shiloh) camp ground, which was used for religious camp meetings, common on the American frontier for worship, preaching and communion during the Second Great Awakening of the early 19th century.

The Shiloh area was the scene of a notorious event on 8 July 1872 during the Pope County Militia War where it was alleged a sheriff's posse (militia) opened fire on four unarmed men in their custody, killing two. The four men had been arrested for suspicion of firing on and wounding deputy-sheriff John H. Williams after he returned home following a 4 July barbecue held by the radical faction of the Republican party, though it was believed by many that the evidence of the shooting and wounding was staged by the sheriff.

On 25 June 1935, a Civilian Conservation Corps (CCC) camp was established east of Shiloh church. While many CCC camps worked in forests and parks, the primary focus of Camp Shiloh, also known as Fort Shiloh, was soil conservation, performing work to remedy soil erosion.

In the 1960s, prior to the filling of the new Lake Dardanelle, remains from four historical cemeteries—Shiloh, Williamson, and Smith in Pope County and Jetton and Reznor in Johnson County—were moved to a new cemetery named Shiloh-Williamson Memorial Cemetery near the original location of the Shiloh Cumberland Presbyterian Church.

Two Russellville city parks, Shiloh Park and Pleasant View Park, provide recreational and other opportunities in the Shiloh area on and next to lands reclaimed from abandoned surface coal mines.
