= List of tornadoes in the outbreak of April 25–28, 2024 =

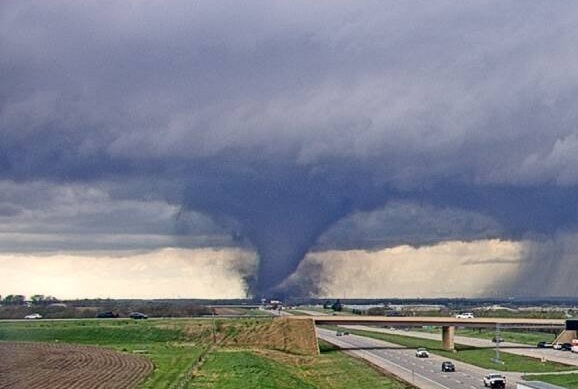
An EF3 tornado near Lincoln, Nebraska on April 26

On April 25–28, 2024, a large tornado outbreak affected much of the Central United States.

== Confirmed tornadoes ==
Daily statistics
Date	Total	EFU	EF0	EF1	EF2	EF3	EF4	EF5	Deaths	Injuries
April 25	6	6	0	0	0	0	0	0	0	0
April 26	78	11	20	29	12	5	1	0	1	16
April 27	57	12	14	24	4	2	1	0	4	59+
April 28	25	4	8	13	0	0	0	0	1	1
Total	166	33	42	66	16	7	2	0	6	76+

=== April 25 event ===
List of confirmed tornadoes – Thursday, April 25, 2024 (Note: All dates are based on the local time zone where the tornado touched down; however, all times are in Coordinated Universal Time for consistency.)
EF#	Location	County / Parish	State	Start Coord.	Time (UTC)	Path length	Max width
EFU	Northern Herriman	Salt Lake	UT	40.53°N 112.01°W	17:07–17:12	Unknown	Unknown
EFU	A landspout had numerous photos and videos taken of it. No damage was noted.						
EFU	ESE of Huntley	Goshen	WY	41.92°N 104.09°W	21:15–21:25	0.92 mi (1.48 km)	20 yd (18 m)
EFU	A stationary tornado was reported by numerous sources.						
EFU	ESE of Woodrow	Washington	CO	39.97°N 103.37°W	21:25–21:26	0.25 mi (0.40 km)	50 yd (46 m)
EFU	Multiple photos were taken of a tornado and posted on social media. A webcam also caught the tornado on video.						
EFU	SSW of Bird City	Cheyenne	KS	39.6088°N 101.5899°W	21:45–21:48	0.01 mi (0.016 km)	10 yd (9.1 m)
EFU	A brief, small tornado was reported. No damage was found.						
EFU	E of Clarkville	Yuma	CO	40.3674°N 102.5126°W	23:15–23:18	0.04 mi (0.064 km)	100 yd (91 m)
EFU	A landspout tornado remained stationary over open rangeland.						
EFU	E of Clarkville	Yuma	CO	40.3999°N 102.4699°W	23:29–23:31	0.22 mi (0.35 km)	100 yd (91 m)
EFU	A tornado was filmed over open fields.						

=== April 26 event ===
List of confirmed tornadoes – Friday, April 26, 2024
EF#	Location	County / Parish	State	Start Coord.	Time (UTC)	Path length	Max width
EF0	NNW of Pink	Cleveland	OK	35.306°N 97.177°W	09:49–09:50	0.54 mi (0.87 km)	30 yd (27 m)
EF0	A brief tornado caused sporadic tree damage, damaged the roof of a mobile home, and scattered sheet metal.						
EF0	SSE of Newalla (1st tornado)	Pottawatomie	OK	35.333°N 97.141°W	09:52–09:55	2.4 mi (3.9 km)	40 yd (37 m)
EF0	Two barns had siding damage and some trees were damaged as well. The tornado was then absorbed by the EF1 tornado below.						
EF1	SSE of Newalla (2nd tornado)	Cleveland, Pottawatomie	OK	35.352°N 97.143°W	09:53–09:56	1.93 mi (3.11 km)	75 yd (69 m)
EF1	This tornado, which absorbed the EF0 tornado above, snapped trees, and inflicted roof damage to a home and an outbuilding shortly after touching down. Minor tree damage occurred along the rest of the tornado's path.						
EF0	Northwestern Shawnee	Pottawatomie	OK	35.356°N 96.969°W	10:05–10:08	2.4 mi (3.9 km)	50 yd (46 m)
EF0	This intermittent tornado inflicted minor roof damage to homes, damaged or destroyed outbuildings, damaged power lines, blew down fences, and snapped, uprooted, or damaged trees.						
EF1	NNW of Centerview to N of Paden	Pottawatomie, Lincoln, Okfuskee	OK	35.447°N 96.675°W	10:28–10:39	9.9 mi (15.9 km)	500 yd (460 m)
EF1	Homes were damaged, trees were snapped or uprooted, and power poles were blown down.						
EF0	NNE of Prague	Lincoln	OK	35.528°N 96.677°W	10:31	0.2 mi (0.32 km)	30 yd (27 m)
EF0	A home received roof damage from a brief tornado.						
EF1	NW of Okmulgee to SW of Bald Hill	Okmulgee	OK	35.656°N 96.0096°W	11:18–11:25	6.9 mi (11.1 km)	650 yd (590 m)
EF1	Numerous trees were uprooted or snapped, the roofs of a few homes were damaged, an outbuilding was damaged, and power poles were blown down by this high-end EF1 tornado.						
EF1	Northwestern McAlester	Pittsburg	OK	34.9435°N 95.7835°W	12:22–12:24	1.7 mi (2.7 km)	250 yd (230 m)
EF1	Homes had their roofs damaged, trees were uprooted and power poles were snapped.						
EF1	ENE of Ravenna	Buffalo, Sherman	NE	41.0188°N 98.8736°W	17:16–17:31	4.67 mi (7.52 km)	175 yd (160 m)
EF1	A low-end EF1 tornado caused minor damage to a catwalk at an ethanol plant, damaged a power pole, and damaged or destroyed outbuildings.						
EF0	ESE of China Spring (1st tornado)	McLennan	TX	31.6277°N 97.2599°W	17:23–17:24	0.15 mi (0.24 km)	30 yd (27 m)
EF0	A brief EF0 tornado damaged fences and snapped large tree limbs.						
EF1	ESE of China Spring (2nd tornado)	McLennan	TX	31.6316°N 97.2524°W	17:26–17:29	0.88 mi (1.42 km)	100 yd (91 m)
EF1	A brief EF1 tornado first touched down near FM 1637, before impacting Valley View west of Waco. Fences, trees, and windows were damaged along with minor roof damage. One home lost part of its roof. This was the second tornado produced by the supercell west of Waco.						
EF1	Eastern Rockville	Sherman	NE	41.0951°N 98.8275°W	17:32–17:48	5.68 mi (9.14 km)	100 yd (91 m)
EF1	This tornado touched down after the Ravenna tornado dissipated. It damaged trees, a home, a couple of grain bins and outbuildings, and snapped power poles.						
EF2	SE of West to SW of Penelope	McLennan, Hill	TX	31.7754°N 97.0496°W	17:48–18:05	5.68 mi (9.14 km)	165 yd (151 m)
EF2	This tornado first touched down southeast of West and damaged several trees and a shed. The tornado then strengthened to low-end EF2 intensity, damaging a barn and a nearby shop. It then scattered heavy farm equipment across a field before crossing into Hill County and dissipating.						
EF0	SSE of West	McLennan	TX	31.7637°N 97.0656°W	17:48–17:49	0.18 mi (0.29 km)	15 yd (14 m)
EF0	A brief EF0 tornado produced tree damage west of the Heritage Parkway (FM 2311).						
EF0	S of Farwell	Howard	NE	41.1788°N 98.6462°W	17:52–17:58	2.69 mi (4.33 km)	50 yd (46 m)
EF0	A short-lived tornado, which formed after the Rockville tornado, overturned two center irrigation pivot systems and damaged some trees. Ground scouring was also visible from the tornado.						
EF3	ESE of Farwell to N of Elba	Howard	NE	41.2028°N 98.6199°W	17:58–18:21	8.65 mi (13.92 km)	600 yd (550 m)
EF3	This intense tornado formed after the Farwell tornado dissipated. It touched down just south of Farwell and passed east of the town and crossed N-92 as it moved just east of due north, causing tree damage and overturning center irrigation pivots. The tornado then reached low-end EF2 intensity as it approached Elba, snapping power poles and uprooting trees. The tornado then reached its peak intensity of EF3 as it struck a farmstead west of Elba. A well-built metal building structure was obliterated while the farmhouse, other outbuildings, vehicles, and other structures were heavily damaged. Continuing north-northeastward at EF2 strength, the tornado snapped a long stretch of power poles along N-11. The tornado then weakened, uprooting trees before dissipating over pasture fields.						
EF1	SW of Penelope	Hill	TX	31.8287°N 96.9664°W	18:06–18:07	0.2 mi (0.32 km)	55 yd (50 m)
EF1	After producing the EF2 tornado southeast of West, the same supercell produced this brief EF1 tornado that damaged two homes with one of them suffering a garage collapse as well. A few tree limbs were broken before the tornado dissipated.						
EF1	ENE of Malone to SSE of Blooming Grove	Navarro	TX	31.9508°N 96.8032°W	18:30–18:44	9.01 mi (14.50 km)	200 yd (180 m)
EF1	This tornado first touched down northwest of Navarro Mills Lake, producing tree damage. After moving east-northeast, the tornado strengthened to high-end EF1 intensity, damaging trees and several residential areas, destroying one manufactured home, and causing significant damage to sheet metal. After crossing FM 744, the tornado dissipated northwest of Dresden.						
EF2	NE of Elba to N of Wolbach	Howard, Greeley	NE	41.3446°N 98.5073°W	18:32–18:54	9.64 mi (15.51 km)	880 yd (800 m)
EF2	This large tornado developed after the Elba EF3 tornado dissipated, first damaging trees and leaned a wooden power pole. As it approached US 281/N-22, the tornado rapidly intensified to high-end EF2 strength. It destroyed a metal building and bent metal high-tension power poles. A nearby grain bin was destroyed, a center irrigation pivot was twisted and overturned, and damage to a home occurred. After crossing the highway, the tornado steadily weakened, damaging at least one other residence, outbuildings, trees, and center irrigation pivots. The tornado weakened and dissipated north of Wolbach.						
EF1	SW of Barry to NE of Emhouse	Navarro	TX	32.0764°N 96.674°W	18:46–19:05	11.3 mi (18.2 km)	200 yd (180 m)
EF1	This tornado first developed southwest of Barry before moving north of the city and causing roof and sheet metal damage to residential areas and outbuildings. A manufactured home was completely destroyed there at high-end EF1 strength. The tornado then tracked east, passing Emhouse, and causing damage to trees and outbuildings. The tornado then dissipated west of Rice, in a drainage area of Chambers Creek.						
EF1	NNW of Abbott	Hill	TX	31.883°N 97.0869°W	18:49–18:53	2.4 mi (3.9 km)	200 yd (180 m)
EF1	This tornado first uprooted and damaged trees west of I-35/US 77 near Abbott before crossing the interstate and flipping a tractor-trailer. The tornado then moved northeast-north of Abbott producing tree damage and minor damage to several homes before dissipating.						
EF2	NNE of Wolbach to W of Primrose to SW of Petersburg	Greeley, Boone	NE	41.4553°N 98.3695°W	19:04–20:10	27.25 mi (43.85 km)	500 yd (460 m)
EF2	This long-lived tornado touched down shortly after the first Wolbach EF2 tornado dissipated. Moving north-northeastward, it initially caused EF0-EF1 damage to center irrigation pivot systems and trees. The tornado then crossed into Boone County, causing minor damage to a farmhouse and damaging trees. After crossing N-56 and turning almost due north the tornado strengthened some, flipping and tossing several center irrigation pivots, snapped power poles, and lofted debris into power lines. The tornado then rapidly reached high-end EF2 intensity southwest of Primrose. A home had its three-car garage ripped away along with most of its roof, several outbuildings were damaged or destroyed, power poles were snapped, and many trees suffered extensive damage. The tornado then continued north-northeastward for several more miles, damaging trees and center pivot irrigation systems, causing extensive damage to a livestock facility, and snapping several power poles before dissipating.						
EF0	W of Rice	Navarro	TX	32.2272°N 96.5455°W	19:19–19:23	2.12 mi (3.41 km)	100 yd (91 m)
EF0	A brief tornado developed west of Rice before moving into wetlands of Cummins Creek. There, the tornado caused minor damage to trees before dissipating near I-45.						
EF0	Western Frost	Navarro	TX	32.0738°N 96.8302°W	19:30–19:31	1.14 mi (1.83 km)	100 yd (91 m)
EF0	A brief tornado moved along SH 22, causing a grain elevator to partially collapse and damaging garage doors and roofs in western portions of Frost before dissipating.						
EF1	SSE of Ulysses to SSE of Garrison	Butler	NE	41.053°N 97.109°W	19:51–20:07	8.09 mi (13.02 km)	200 yd (180 m)
EF1	This multi-vortex tornado overturned irrigation pivots and snapped several trees and a road sign across its intermittent path.						
EF3	Northeastern Lincoln to W of Waverly	Lancaster	NE	40.8575°N 96.6121°W	19:52–19:57	5.25 mi (8.45 km)	700 yd (640 m)
EF3	This intense tornado, the first one produced by the Elkhorn supercell, formed on the northeast side of Lincoln causing minor EF0 damage to a business before quickly intensifying to high-end EF2 intensity, heavily damaging a large transmission line. The tornado continued to intensify as it moved northeastward through agricultural fields, snapping power poles and large trees. The tornado reached its peak intensity of high-end EF3 intensity as it hit a manufacturing plant along US 6 where 70 employees were sheltered. The roof of the structure along with three walls of the plant failed and cars in the parking lot were damaged, including some that were thrown at least 75–100 yards (69–91 m). Northeast of this location, EF1-EF2 damage occurred as trees were snapped at a nearby business, which sustained roof and siding damage, wooden power poles were snapped, and several cars on a BNSF freight train were derailed. The tornado scattered debris through fields as it continued northeastward and crossed I-80 lifting just west of Waverly. Three people were injured.						
EF1	NW of Waverly	Lancaster	NE	40.92°N 96.56°W	19:57–20:01	2.96 mi (4.76 km)	150 yd (140 m)
EF1	The second tornado of the Elkhorn supercell spawned just before the Lincoln-Waverly EF3 dissipated. Damage occurred to trees and powerlines and two large outbuildings were destroyed.						
EF0	N of Waverly	Lancaster	NE	40.95°N 96.553°W	20:03–20:07	1.9 mi (3.1 km)	50 yd (46 m)
EF0	This weak tornado, the third from the Elkhorn supercell inflicted minor damage to trees.						
EFU	E of Garrison	Butler	NE	41.1646°N 97.0716°W	20:06–20:07	0.72 mi (1.16 km)	30 yd (27 m)
EFU	A very weak tornado briefly formed as the Garrison EF1 tornado was dissipating; no damage was found.						
EF1	NNW of Greenwood to SSE of Memphis	Lancaster, Saunders	NE	41.0301°N 96.4797°W	20:12–20:18	3.83 mi (6.16 km)	50 yd (46 m)
EF1	Tracking from Lancaster into Saunders County, this high-end EF1 tornado was the fourth tornado from the Elkhorn supercell. It moved over fields, producing a persistent surface circulation and dust whirl, and some moderate tree damage was found along the path.						
EFU	SE of Albion	Boone	NE	41.65°N 97.93°W	20:27–20:28	1.01 mi (1.63 km)	50 yd (46 m)
EFU	A tornado was filmed and it did not cause damage.						
EF4	SE of Yutan, NE to Western Elkhorn, NE to S of Modale, IA	Douglas (NE), Washington (NE), Harrison (IA)	NE, IA	41.1999°N 96.3267°W	20:30–21:31	32.50 mi (52.30 km)	1,900 yd (1,700 m)
EF4	See article on this tornado – Four people were injured.						
EF2	NNE of Longton to W of Fredonia	Elk, Wilson	KS	37.4598°N 96.0134°W	20:32–20:46	8.47 mi (13.63 km)	100 yd (91 m)
EF2	An EF2 tornado first developed in Elk County, uprooting and damaging trees, before crossing into Wilson County and destroying a barn. A two-story home was mostly unroofed, a water tower was unroofed, and a metal fence was also destroyed. The tornado continued to move northeast while producing tree damage before dissipating southwest of Fredonia.						
EF2	NE of Coyville to SSW of Yates Center	Wilson, Woodson	KS	37.7262°N 95.8364°W	20:34–20:50	6.71 mi (10.80 km)	100 yd (91 m)
EF2	A low-end EF2 tornado destroyed outbuildings and snapped trees at their bases.						
EFU	NE of Albion	Boone	NE	41.71°N 97.9°W	20:42–20:44	2.03 mi (3.27 km)	100 yd (91 m)
EFU	A tornado was filmed and it did not cause damage.						
EF0	W of Fredonia	Wilson	KS	37.5304°N 95.8562°W	20:52–20:55	0.99 mi (1.59 km)	150 yd (140 m)
EF0	An EF0 tornado developed just west of Fredonia after the Busby–Fredonia EF2 tornado dissipated. It damaged parts of the metal roofs of buildings at the fairgrounds before dissipating.						
EF1	SSE of Creston	Platte	NE	41.6004°N 97.3551°W	21:07–21:20	4.79 mi (7.71 km)	100 yd (91 m)
EF1	A tornado was observed to be touching down by trained spotters and it immediately flipped a center pivot irrigation system. The tornado continued north-northeast intermittently, before reaching a homestead. At the homestead, trees were snapped, windows were blown out and a barn was dealt significant roof damage. The tornado continued north, minorly damaging fencing and a pole before becoming intermittent once more and lifting shortly after.						
EF1	E of Benedict	Wilson	KS	37.6281°N 95.6515°W	21:13–21:16	1.28 mi (2.06 km)	60 yd (55 m)
EF1	This tornado first produced tree damage near a cemetery before moving northeast and damaged a barn before dissipating.						
EF1	S of Pisgah to SW of Moorhead	Harrison, Monona	IA	41.7478°N 95.9148°W	21:52–22:09	9.12 mi (14.68 km)	766 yd (700 m)
EF1	A high-end EF1 tornado damaged or destroyed outbuildings, snapped wooden power poles, and damaged trees and homes. This was the sixth tornado produced by the Elkhorn supercell.						
EF1	NNW of Pacific Junction to NW of Glenwood	Mills	IA	41.0344°N 95.8051°W	21:52–21:57	2.7 mi (4.3 km)	80 yd (73 m)
EF1	A tornado developed north of Pacific Junction damaging trees and power poles. Moving generally northward, the tornado crossed US 34/US 275, ripping a large portion of the roof off of a house and flipping a large camper on its side. The tornado then moved through a forested area, where many tree were snapped before the tornado dissipated.						
EF3	Western Council Bluffs, IA to Northeastern Omaha, NE to S of Beebeetown, IA	Pottawattamie (IA), Douglas (NE), Harrison (IA)	IA, NE	41.262°N 95.903°W	21:54–22:28	19.06 mi (30.67 km)	550 yd (500 m)
EF3	See section on this tornado						
EF0	ESE of Pisgah	Harrison	IA	41.8021°N 95.8899°W	21:59–22:04	2.64 mi (4.25 km)	200 yd (180 m)
EF0	This tornado, the seventh produced by the Elkhorn supercell, was a satellite to the 2152 UTC tornado.						
EF3	Dumfries to ENE of McClelland	Pottawattamie	IA	41.1833°N 95.7307°W	22:08–22:28	13.31 mi (21.42 km)	900 yd (820 m)
EF3	This intense tornado destroyed a home, leaving only the basement behind, while other homes suffered significant roof and exterior wall damage. The tornado also destroyed a large shed, tossed a large steel horse trailer and damaged electrical poles, outbuildings, trees, including some tree trucks that were snapped. The same storm produced the EF3 Minden tornado as this tornado was dissipating.						
EFU	SSW of Verdon	Richardson	NE	40.12°N 95.72°W	22:10	0.01 mi (0.016 km)	1 yd (0.91 m)
EFU	A very brief tornado was reported; it did not cause damage.						
EF1	SE of Norfolk	Madison, Stanton	NE	41.9887°N 97.3695°W	22:16–22:19	0.72 mi (1.16 km)	100 yd (91 m)
EF1	A brief high-end EF1 tornado caused tree damage at a farmstead as well as damage to other large trees, a gymnastics gym, and a pallet plant.						
EF0	NE of Moorhead to SW of Soldier	Monona	IA	41.9447°N 95.8274°W	22:17–22:19	1.47 mi (2.37 km)	100 yd (91 m)
EF0	A weak tornado tossed around debris. It was the eighth tornado from the Elkhorn supercell.						
EF1	Western Soldier	Monona	IA	41.9711°N 95.8061°W	22:23–22:30	3.29 mi (5.29 km)	250 yd (230 m)
EF1	An EF1 tornado moved through the western part of Soldier. It was the ninth and final tornado from the Elkhorn supercell.						
EF3	ESE of McClelland to Minden to N of Defiance	Pottawattamie, Harrison, Shelby	IA	41.3221°N 95.6171°W	22:25–23:29	40.91 mi (65.84 km)	1,900 yd (1,700 m)
EF3	1 death – See article on this tornado – Three people were injured.						
EF0	NNE of Uniontown to WSW of Devon	Bourbon	KS	37.89°N 94.96°W	22:29–22:32	3.34 mi (5.38 km)	75 yd (69 m)
EF0	A high-end EF0 tornado inflicted siding damage to a home, damaged or destroyed five outbuildings, and uprooted or snapped large limbs off of trees.						
EF1	SE of Logan	Harrison	IA	41.61°N 95.72°W	22:40–22:43	1.84 mi (2.96 km)	30 yd (27 m)
EF1	The porch was ripped from a house, a large camper was destroyed, and trees were damaged.						
EFU	S of Rulo	Richardson	NE	40.04°N 95.43°W	22:45	0.01 mi (0.016 km)	1 yd (0.91 m)
EFU	A very brief tornado was reported; it did not cause damage.						
EFU	WNW of Elsmore	Allen	KS	37.8203°N 95.2306°W	23:02–23:03	0.01 mi (0.016 km)	10 yd (9.1 m)
EFU	A storm chaser filmed a tornado over open country.						
EF1	NW of Metz	Vernon	MO	37.99°N 94.51°W	23:07–23:13	3.42 mi (5.50 km)	95 yd (87 m)
EF1	Two outbuildings were destroyed, and trees were either uprooted or had large limbs snapped.						
EFU	S of Skidmore	Holt	MO	40.2497°N 95.0817°W	23:14	0.01 mi (0.016 km)	1 yd (0.91 m)
EFU	The fire department reported a weak tornado visible in open country. No damage occurred.						
EF2	SSW of Manilla to SSW of Vail	Shelby, Crawford	IA	41.8593°N 95.2603°W	23:28–23:44	9.1 mi (14.6 km)	200 yd (180 m)
EF2	A low-end EF2 tornado began near a wildlife management area and began moving due north. Trees had all their trunks snapped and branches removed. The tornado then reached its peak intensity, completely destroying a barn before lifting.						
EFU	WNW of Astor	Crawford	IA	41.8692°N 95.3294°W	23:30–23:35	2.51 mi (4.04 km)	50 yd (46 m)
EFU	A brief tornado caused no damage.						
EF0	ESE of Pleasant Gap	Bates	MO	38.1592°N 94.1396°W	23:36–23:41	0.85 mi (1.37 km)	50 yd (46 m)
EF0	Shingles and siding of a home and outbuilding were damaged and caused minor tree damage.						
EF0	WSW of Appleton City	Bates	MO	38.1655°N 94.0981°W	23:47–23:52	1.13 mi (1.82 km)	50 yd (46 m)
EF0	This tornado caused primarily tree damage.						
EF1	NE of Defiance to NW of Aspinwall	Shelby, Crawford	IA	41.816°N 95.337°W	23:49–00:08	13.03 mi (20.97 km)	200 yd (180 m)
EF1	A high-end EF1 tornado tracked northeast, impacting several farms and damaging trees and damaging or destroying outbuildings along its path. This tornado crossed paths of a tornado damage path from an hour earlier.						
EF2	NNW of Kent to Northern Creston	Adams, Union	IA	40.982°N 94.4915°W	23:52–00:10	9.71 mi (15.63 km)	350 yd (320 m)
EF2	Several homes and condos on the northwest side of Creston suffered moderate to heavy roof damage, including some that had their roofs partially removed and one home that had an exterior wall partially pulled out. A camper and farm outbuildings were damaged, minor damage was observed at athletic fields at a high school, wooden power poles were snapped, and trees were snapped or uprooted as well.						
EF0	WSW of Appleton City	St. Clair	MO	38.1911°N 94.0508°W	23:56–23:57	0.17 mi (0.27 km)	50 yd (46 m)
EF0	A brief tornado uprooted trees and downed power lines.						
EF1	NE of Creston	Union	IA	41.1073°N 94.3169°W	00:14–00:19	2.85 mi (4.59 km)	80 yd (73 m)
EF1	Three farmsteads were struck by this tornado, damaging outbuildings.						
EF2	WSW of Afton to W of Barney	Union, Madison	IA	41.0195°N 94.2701°W	00:19–00:45	13.98 mi (22.50 km)	150 yd (140 m)
EF2	A high-end EF2 tornado damaged or destroyed outbuildings including one building at the Wildlife Management Center, partially or completely removed the roofs off of homes, and damaged, snapped, or uprooted trees.						
EF1	NW of Irena, MO to ESE of Delphos, IA	Worth (MO), Ringgold (IA)	MO, IA	40.5585°N 94.4058°W	00:23–00:41	8.47 mi (13.63 km)	300 yd (270 m)
EF1	This tornado caused minor damage to a home in Missouri. After crossing the state line into Iowa, the tornado strengthened to high-end EF1 intensity, snapping and uprooting trees, damaging and destroying outbuildings, and damaging the roofs of homes.						
EF0	ESE of Clinton	Henry	MO	38.3501°N 93.7172°W	00:34–00:35	0.42 mi (0.68 km)	30 yd (27 m)
EF0	Two outbuildings made of corrugated steel and wood were damaged.						
EF1	SSE of Delphos to ENE of Mount Ayr	Ringgold	IA	40.6157°N 94.3071°W	00:36–00:56	11.68 mi (18.80 km)	300 yd (270 m)
EF1	This high-end EF1 tornado snapped or uprooted trees and damaged the roofs of homes.						
EF0	E of Clinton	Henry	MO	38.3643°N 93.6908°W	00:36–00:37	0.73 mi (1.17 km)	50 yd (46 m)
EF0	Trees and an outbuilding were damaged.						
EF1	S of Creston to NNW of Afton	Union	IA	40.9676°N 94.3476°W	00:38–00:54	9.43 mi (15.18 km)	150 yd (140 m)
EF1	A tornado damaged trees and grain bins.						
EF1	ENE of Mount Ayr to NNE of Beaconsfield	Ringgold	IA	40.73°N 94.1375°W	00:51–01:08	9.07 mi (14.60 km)	250 yd (230 m)
EF1	A high-end EF1 tornado damaged the roofs of homes, damaged outbuildings, including one that partially collapsed, damaged power poles, and snapped or uprooted trees.						
EF2	WNW of Afton to W of Lorimor	Union	IA	41.0399°N 94.2517°W	00:51–01:01	6.65 mi (10.70 km)	130 yd (120 m)
EF2	A second high-end EF2 tornado occurred just to the west of the first EF2 Afton tornado. A structure in the Wildlife Management Building area was damaged just a few hundred yards from another one that was impacted by the previous EF2 tornado. Several homes suffered extensive damage with roofs removed and exterior walls buckled. A light pole was snapped, and trees were damaged, snapped, or uprooted.						
EFU	WNW of East Peru	Madison	IA	41.2467°N 94.0068°W	00:57–00:58	0.56 mi (0.90 km)	30 yd (27 m)
EFU	This tornado remained over open country, causing no damage.						
EFU	S of Patterson	Madison	IA	41.336°N 93.8998°W	01:16–01:19	1.43 mi (2.30 km)	30 yd (27 m)
EFU	This tornado remained over open country, causing no damage.						
EF2	ESE of Diagonal to NE of Tingley	Ringgold	IA	40.7828°N 94.2923°W	01:19–01:36	10.2 mi (16.4 km)	100 yd (91 m)
EF2	A damaging, strong tornado passed directly through the town of Tingley, destroying a brick building at a park, and heavily damaging the roofs of homes, including one home that had an upper floor removed. Tree damage, as well as outbuilding and farmstead damage, occurred along the path of the tornado as well.						
EF0	WNW of Cumming	Madison, Dallas	IA	41.4856°N 93.8424°W	01:21–01:27	3.65 mi (5.87 km)	30 yd (27 m)
EF0	A power pole was leaned, trees were damaged or uprooted, and debris was scattered.						
EF2	Osceola	Clarke	IA	41.0043°N 93.7908°W	01:31–01:42	5.84 mi (9.40 km)	75 yd (69 m)
EF2	A high-end EF2 tornado damaged an outbuilding and heavily damaged a home southwest of Osceola. The tornado then moved through the town at EF0-EF1 strength, snapping trees and inflicting roof damage to homes. After exiting the town, the tornado impacted one more farmstead before dissipating.						
EF2	Southeast Des Moines to Pleasant Hill to S of Altoona	Polk	IA	41.5486°N 93.5802°W	01:50–02:02	7.61 mi (12.25 km)	150 yd (140 m)
EF2	A strong tornado struck Pleasant Hill, a suburb southeast of Des Moines. Several homes and mobile homes suffered severe roof damage, including one home that was completely unroofed, and had exterior walls knocked down. Power poles were snapped, and trees were snapped or uprooted. One injury occurred.						
EF1	ESE of Monroe to SSW of Reasnor	Jasper	IA	41.516°N 93.0929°W	02:42–02:50	4.09 mi (6.58 km)	80 yd (73 m)
EF1	A high-end EF1 tornado rolled and destroyed a mobile home, destroyed several barns, inflicted roof damage to homes and other outbuildings, and snapped or uprooted trees. One injury occurred.						
EFU	E of Reasnor to W of Killduff	Jasper	IA	41.5836°N 92.9765°W	02:55–02:58	1.66 mi (2.67 km)	50 yd (46 m)
EFU	An emergency manager reported a brief tornado over rural farmland. No damage was found.						

=== April 27 event ===
List of confirmed tornadoes – Saturday, April 27, 2024
EF#	Location	County / Parish	State	Start Coord.	Time (UTC)	Path length	Max width
EF1	ENE of Strong City	Roger Mills	OK	35.703°N 99.527°W	15:11–15:12	0.7 mi (1.1 km)	50 yd (46 m)
EF1	This tornado, which was confirmed by the Roger Mills County Emergency Manager, snapped trees.						
EF0	NW of Hammon	Roger Mills	OK	35.6914°N 99.4556°W	15:18	0.1 mi (0.16 km)	10 yd (9.1 m)
EF0	A storm chaser observed a brief tornado that caused no damage.						
EF1	Hillsdale	Garfield	OK	36.56°N 97.99°W	18:21–18:22	0.8 mi (1.3 km)	100 yd (91 m)
EF1	This tornado caused tree and powerline damage in Hillsdale according to Garfield County Emergency Management.						
EFU	NE of Robinson	Brown	KS	39.8752°N 95.4246°W	19:05–19:15	3.93 mi (6.32 km)	25 yd (23 m)
EFU	An NWS employee photographed an intermittent tornado over rural land.						
EFU	W of White Cloud	Doniphan	KS	39.9678°N 95.3281°W	19:15	0.01 mi (0.016 km)	1 yd (0.91 m)
EFU	A tornado was reported by emergency management; no damage occurred.						
EF0	S of Centralia	Nemaha	KS	39.6638°N 96.1449°W	19:31–19:32	1.03 mi (1.66 km)	20 yd (18 m)
EF0	A brief tornado produced minor tree damage and tore part of the roof off of a barn.						
EF1	SE of Peckham to W of Newkirk	Kay	OK	36.861°N 97.141°W	19:39–19:44	2.6 mi (4.2 km)	30 yd (27 m)
EF1	This high-end EF1 tornado damaged a barn and a carport and snapped trees.						
EF0	NNW of Goff	Nemaha	KS	39.6884°N 95.9459°W	19:45–19:47	0.58 mi (0.93 km)	75 yd (69 m)
EF0	A brief tornado produced minor tree limb damage.						
EF1	NNE of Newkirk to SE of Chilocco	Kay	OK	36.935°N 97.033°W	19:54–19:56	1 mi (1.6 km)	75 yd (69 m)
EF1	Outbuildings and mobile homes were damaged, and trees were snapped.						
EF2	S of Knox City to W of Rhineland	Knox	TX	33.402°N 99.817°W	20:06–20:45	12.3 mi (19.8 km)	1,000 yd (910 m)
EF2	This large tornado touched down south of Knox City and moved eastward across SH-6, snapping and uprooting trees and damaging a home. It then turned northeastward and struck the southeastern part of Knox City, damaging homes, snapping trees, and rolling an RV. At an RWD facility, two shipping containers were blown to the northeast and fences were damaged. After turning eastward and damaging outbuildings and homes and uprooting trees along SH 222 east of Knox City, the tornado again turned northeastward over open terrain and reached its maximum width. It heavily damaged or destroyed outbuildings and barns, damaged homes, and snapped or uprooted trees. It also snapped numerous wooden power poles, which was the basis for the low-end EF2 rating. The tornado then dissipated west of Rhineland.						
EF0	NNW of Stillwater	Payne	OK	36.172°N 97.129°W	20:20–20:27	5.2 mi (8.4 km)	30 yd (27 m)
EF0	This tornado damaged trees and outbuildings along a non-continuous path.						
EF2	NNE of Maple City to SSW of Dexter	Cowley	KS	37.1118°N 96.7571°W	20:28–20:32	1.29 mi (2.08 km)	100 yd (91 m)
EF2	This strong tornado first started near US 166 north of Maple City, damaging trees as it moved northward. The tornado then became multi-vortex and heavily damaged a well-built metal building, with only walls left standing. A nearby concrete brick structure and barn were also demolished. The tornado then continued northward, producing more tree damage, before dissipating.						
EF1	SSW of Dexter	Cowley	KS	37.1442°N 96.7374°W	20:36–20:39	0.64 mi (1.03 km)	20 yd (18 m)
EF1	A brief EF1 tornado damaged trees, including some that were snapped.						
EF1	W of Seymour to Lake Kemp	Baylor	TX	33.617°N 99.38°W	21:08–21:40	12.7 mi (20.4 km)	300 yd (270 m)
EF1	A silo, a couple of barns, power poles and a few trees were damaged.						
EF0	SW of Hinton	Caddo	OK	35.442°N 98.404°W	21:10–21:12	0.8 mi (1.3 km)	20 yd (18 m)
EF0	This tornado was observed by storm chasers. No damage was observed.						
EF1	S of Gentry to WNW of Martinsville	Gentry, Harrison	MO	40.2953°N 94.4246°W	21:12–21:26	11.64 mi (18.73 km)	250 yd (230 m)
EF1	This low-end EF1 tornado initially touched down along US 169, blowing over a tractor trailer. Moving northeastward, the tornado caused roof damage to a home, damaged to multiple grain bins, and destroyed a small barn. Debris from the barn was strewn around the property. The tornado continued northeastward over open fields, causing little damage before dissipating.						
EFU	NW of Seymour	Baylor	TX	33.668°N 99.358°W	21:15–21:16	0.6 mi (0.97 km)	20 yd (18 m)
EFU	This satellite tornado to the first Seymour tornado was captured by security camera video. No damage occurred.						
EF1	ESE of Geary to N of Calumet	Canadian	OK	35.61°N 98.23°W	21:29–21:39	6.75 mi (10.86 km)	50 yd (46 m)
EF1	A mobile home suffered minor damage, trailers/RVs at an oil field were rolled, and trees and power poles were downed.						
EF1	NW of Moline	Elk	KS	37.4765°N 96.3086°W	21:30–21:31	0.04 mi (0.064 km)	50 yd (46 m)
EF1	Two cedar trees were snapped in a cemetery.						
EF0	N of Kendall	Hamilton	KS	38.01°N 101.55°W	21:35	0.1 mi (0.16 km)	10 yd (9.1 m)
EF0	A tornado damaged an outbuilding and power poles.						
EF1	N of Moline	Elk	KS	37.4131°N 96.2894°W	21:39–21:44	0.48 mi (0.77 km)	40 yd (37 m)
EF1	A few trees fell onto a car, a shed had tin peeled and a smaller tree had its trunk snapped. Some power poles were damaged and branches were broken before the tornado lifted.						
EFU	S of Moline	Elk	KS	37.351°N 96.3009°W	21:42–21:44	0.01 mi (0.016 km)	15 yd (14 m)
EFU	A brief, multi-vortex tornado remained over open land.						
EFU	NE of Elk Falls	Elk	KS	37.3886°N 96.1543°W	21:54–21:55	0.01 mi (0.016 km)	30 yd (27 m)
EFU	A tornado was reported by law enforcement. No damage occurred.						
EF0	SE of Spickard to SE of Mill Grove	Grundy, Mercer	MO	40.2269°N 93.5739°W	21:58–22:07	3.96 mi (6.37 km)	75 yd (69 m)
EF0	This tornado caused sporadic and intermittent tree damage.						
EFU	NE of Fredonia	Wilson	KS	37.56°N 96.79°W	22:35–22:36	0.01 mi (0.016 km)	10 yd (9.1 m)
EFU	A brief tornado occurred in an open field.						
EFU	E of Benedict	Wilson	KS	37.6407°N 95.6511°W	22:56–22:57	0.01 mi (0.016 km)	10 yd (9.1 m)
EFU	A brief tornado was filmed. No damage occurred.						
EF0	Chautauqua (1st tornado)	Chautauqua	KS	37.0241°N 96.1801°W	23:11–23:12	0.03 mi (0.048 km)	20 yd (18 m)
EF0	A brief tornado snapped a large elm tree branch and tossed an unanchored canopy barn.						
EF0	Chautauqua (2nd tornado)	Chautauqua	KS	37.0244°N 96.1768°W	23:11–23:12	0.01 mi (0.016 km)	10 yd (9.1 m)
EF0	A second brief tornado removed some roof covering from an old, abandoned brick bank.						
EF0	NNW of Iowa Park	Wichita	TX	34.038°N 98.735°W	23:23–23:25	1.5 mi (2.4 km)	30 yd (27 m)
EF0	A weak tornado was observed by a NSSL/Texas Tech research team. No significant damage was reported.						
EFU	W of Brookfield	Linn	MO	39.7783°N 93.1212°W	23:37	0.06 mi (0.097 km)	5 yd (4.6 m)
EFU	A trained spotter reported a brief tornado that caused no damage.						
EF1	WNW of Burkburnett, TX to E of Devol, OK	Wichita (TX), Tillman (OK), Cotton (OK)	TX, OK	34.12°N 98.641°W	23:43–23:56	6.5 mi (10.5 km)	100 yd (91 m)
EF1	A tornado damaged power lines in Texas before crossing the Red River into Oklahoma. Trees and powerlines were damaged, and homes and outbuildings sustained roof damage near Devol before the tornado dissipated.						
EFU	NE of Independence	Montgomery	KS	37.26°N 95.68°W	00:45–00:46	0.01 mi (0.016 km)	20 yd (18 m)
EFU	Two photos were captured of this tornado and were posted to social media.						
EFU	SSE of Pumpkin Center	Comanche	OK	34.5365°N 98.1831°W	00:55	0.3 mi (0.48 km)	20 yd (18 m)
EFU	A storm chaser observed a brief tornado that caused no damage.						
EFU	WNW of Grainola	Osage	OK	36.959°N 96.691°W	01:16	0.1 mi (0.16 km)	75 yd (69 m)
EFU	A brief tornado was observed over open country by storm chasers.						
EF1	SSE of Butler	Bates	MO	38.2161°N 94.3123°W	01:23–01:26	2.55 mi (4.10 km)	150 yd (140 m)
EF1	This tornado caused tree damage, including some that were snapped or uprooted. Power poles were damaged as well.						
EF1	S of Altona to WNW of Lucas	Bates, Henry	MO	38.36°N 94.222°W	01:30–01:46	10.14 mi (16.32 km)	250 yd (230 m)
EF1	Several outbuildings were damaged, including one that collapsed and another that had a garage door blown in. A mobile home and other properties also suffered minor damage. Many trees along the path were also damaged, including one tree that fell on and damaged a home and power lines.						
EF0	SE of Piper	Henry	MO	38.3271°N 94.0166°W	01:45–01:48	2.36 mi (3.80 km)	150 yd (140 m)
EF0	A farm building suffered roof damage and trees were damaged as well.						
EF1	NW of Lindsay to SSW of Dibble	McClain, Grady	OK	34.898°N 97.662°W	01:53–02:01	4.4 mi (7.1 km)	225 yd (206 m)
EF1	Trees were damaged along with a mobile home and a storage trailer was rolled. The tornado never fully moved in Grady County, but its centerline briefly moved into the county.						
EF1	NNE of Dibble	McClain	OK	35.069°N 97.612°W	02:12–02:14	0.5 mi (0.80 km)	40 yd (37 m)
EF1	Trees were snapped. Much of the path was inaccessible to ground survey teams.						
EF1	NNE of Ravia to W of Reagan	Johnston	OK	34.282°N 96.731°W	02:16-02:22	4.65 mi (7.48 km)	150 yd (140 m)
EF1	Dozens of trees were snapped or uprooted, and some barns and outbuildings were damaged or destroyed at the end of the track as well.						
EF0	NNW of Cole	McClain	OK	35.105°N 97.584°W	02:17–02:20	1.67 mi (2.69 km)	40 yd (37 m)
EF0	Trees were damaged.						
EF2	N of Cole to NNW of Goldsby	McClain	OK	35.142°N 97.565°W	02:20–02:27	4.9 mi (7.9 km)	125 yd (114 m)
EF2	Some homes sustained heavy roof damage, including some that had their roofs partially removed, although the exact degree of the damage could not be determined due to the structures being in a gated community. Other homes suffered more moderate roof and exterior damage, fences were damaged, and trees were snapped or uprooted as well. The tornado crossed I-35 before dissipating.						
EF1	Northern Norman	Cleveland	OK	35.231°N 97.483°W	02:29–02:36	3.5 mi (5.6 km)	200 yd (180 m)
EF1	This intermittent EF1 tornado damaged a gas station canopy along with buildings at the Max Westheimer Airport and an industrial park. Some homes suffered minor damage, and trees were damaged as well, including some trees that were snapped or uprooted.						
EF2	Western Ardmore to S of Springer	Carter	OK	34.11°N 97.199°W	02:42–02:56	11.3 mi (18.2 km)	400 yd (370 m)
EF2	This high-end EF2 tornado moved northward through the west side of Ardmore, damaging homes and businesses, including several homes that suffered significant roof damage, damaged or destroyed outbuildings, mobile homes, RVs, and trailers, blew train cars and fences over, snapped power poles, and snapped or uprooted trees. The tornado then turned northeastward and crossed I-35, blowing cars and debris off of the interstate. There were 19 injuries. The tornado continued to snap and uproot trees before dissipating along US 77. The storm would later produce the EF3 Sulphur tornado.						
EF1	E of Tinker Air Force Base to Eastern Choctaw	Oklahoma	OK	35.413°N 97.358°W	02:45–02:56	8.5 mi (13.7 km)	150 yd (140 m)
EF1	This tornado damaged the roofs and siding of homes and a church, knocked down fences, damaged power poles, and snapped or uprooted trees.						
EFU	ENE of Lafontaine	Wilson	KS	37.42°N 95.81°W	02:50–02:51	0.01 mi (0.016 km)	10 yd (9.1 m)
EFU	A brief tornado was reported. No known damage occurred.						
EF1	NE of Happyland	Pontotoc	OK	34.804°N 96.519°W	03:15–03:17	1.5 mi (2.4 km)	30 yd (27 m)
EF1	An EF1 tornado damaged trees and outbuildings.						
EF1	SSE of Chandler to E of Kendrick	Lincoln	OK	35.653°N 96.843°W	03:16–03:29	10.35 mi (16.66 km)	250 yd (230 m)
EF1	Outbuildings were damaged or destroyed and trees were snapped or uprooted.						
EF3	Sulphur to WSW of Roff	Murray, Pontotoc	OK	34.474°N 96.992°W	03:23–03:37	9.91 mi (15.95 km)	440 yd (400 m)
EF3	1 death – See article on this tornado – Thirty others were injured.						
EF0	SW of Florence	Morgan	MO	38.55°N 93.04°W	03:29–03:36	3.51 mi (5.65 km)	50 yd (46 m)
EF0	Trees were uprooted along an intermittent path.						
EF3	Spaulding to W of Holdenville to SSW of Okemah	Hughes, Okfuskee	OK	35.001°N 96.442°W	03:36–04:15	27.98 mi (45.03 km)	1,760 yd (1,610 m)
EF3	2 deaths – See section on this tornado – Four people were injured.						
EF1	W of Roff to SSE of Vanoss	Pontotoc	OK	34.621°N 96.915°W	03:37–03:54	8.4 mi (13.5 km)	500 yd (460 m)
EF1	This EF1 tornado touched down as the Sulphur EF3 tornado was dissipating. Two mobile homes were rolled and destroyed, outbuildings and trees were damaged, and power poles were snapped.						
EF0	NNE of Ardmore	Carter	OK	34.212°N 97.1°W	03:45–03:46	0.5 mi (0.80 km)	30 yd (27 m)
EF0	A brief tornado downed a large tree branch in a field.						
EF1	ENE of Tipton to W of Clarksburg	Moniteau	MO	38.6687°N 92.7426°W	03:59–04:00	1.7 mi (2.7 km)	30 yd (27 m)
EF1	Structures and trees were damaged.						
EF1	SE of Lake of the Arbuckles to SSW of Scullin	Murray	OK	34.389°N 96.973°W	04:07–04:18	5.88 mi (9.46 km)	250 yd (230 m)
EF1	An automotive hardware facility suffered heavy damage to its warehouses with nearby outbuildings and homes suffering minor damage. Many trees were damaged along the path as well, including some trees that were snapped or uprooted.						
EF4	SW of Marietta to Dickson to Baum	Love, Carter	OK	33.915°N 97.144°W	04:08–04:33	26.85 mi (43.21 km)	900 yd (820 m)
EF4	1 death – See section on this tornado – Six people were injured.						
EF1	SE of Dougherty to Lake of the Arbuckles	Murray	OK	34.383°N 97.032°W	04:21–04:27	3.5 mi (5.6 km)	100 yd (91 m)
EF1	Tree damage occurred.						

=== April 28 event ===
List of confirmed tornadoes – Sunday, April 28, 2024
EF#	Location	County / Parish	State	Start Coord.	Time (UTC)	Path length	Max width
EF1	W of Schulter to N of Morris	Okmulgee	OK	35.5205°N 95.9962°W	05:01–05:14	11.3 mi (18.2 km)	1,400 yd (1,300 m)
EF1	This large, high-end EF1 tornado developed west of Schulter and widened as it moved northeastward, uprooting or snapping numerous trees. It then struck Morris, damaging numerous homes and businesses. The tornado then turned to the north of Morris and quickly dissipated.						
EF1	NE of Morris to NE of Pumpkin Center	Okmulgee	OK	35.6068°N 95.8408°W	05:14–05:23	8.9 mi (14.3 km)	1,100 yd (1,000 m)
EF1	Another large high-end EF1 tornado developed and moved northeastward as the first Morris tornado was dissipating. Numerous trees and power poles were snapped or uprooted, several homes were damaged, and several outbuildings were destroyed.						
EFU	W of Troy	Johnston	OK	34.314°N 96.897°W	05:22–05:25	1.1 mi (1.8 km)	200 yd (180 m)
EFU	A storm chaser and a local fire department observed a tornado. No damage was reported.						
EF1	W of Taft	Muskogee	OK	35.7068°N 95.6817°W	05:28–05:35	6.2 mi (10.0 km)	800 yd (730 m)
EF1	A tornado snapped large tree limbs and uprooted trees.						
EF1	ESE of Choska to NE of Porter	Wagoner	OK	35.8232°N 95.5798°W	05:37–05:55	9.8 mi (15.8 km)	750 yd (690 m)
EF1	The roof of a home was damaged, a small outbuilding was destroyed, and trees were uprooted and snapped by this high-end EF1 tornado.						
EF1	SW of Wagoner	Wagoner	OK	35.9329°N 95.4178°W	05:55–05:58	1.6 mi (2.6 km)	440 yd (400 m)
EF1	Several large trees were uprooted or snapped and power poles were damaged by this high-end EF1 tornado.						
EF1	NNE of Peggs	Cherokee	OK	36.1031°N 95.0927°W	06:23–06:30	4.3 mi (6.9 km)	350 yd (320 m)
EF1	Trees were snapped and uprooted.						
EF1	Manor	Travis	TX	30.3401°N 97.5841°W	13:31–13:41	4.82 mi (7.76 km)	20 yd (18 m)
EF1	This small tornado touched down west of Manor and moved generally eastward, causing minor roof damage to several businesses, knocking down a billboard into a gas station parking lot along US 290, and damaging trees. To the north of Manor, the tornado weakened or reformed further to the north and strengthened to high-end EF1 intensity causing significant roof damage to a home in a neighborhood. Other homes throughout both that neighborhood and an adjacent one also suffered significant shingle damage, fences were damaged, trampolines were tossed, and some trees were damaged. The tornado then dissipated to the northeast of Manor.						
EF0	Burlington	Milam	TX	31.0102°N 96.9941°W	19:50–19:51	0.19 mi (0.31 km)	40 yd (37 m)
EF0	Metal panels were peeled from a few uninhabited mobile homes.						
EF0	E of Groesbeck	Limestone	TX	31.5081°N 96.38°W	20:08–20:09	0.18 mi (0.29 km)	30 yd (27 m)
EF0	A tornado was filmed by a storm spotter which showed tree limbs being tossed.						
EF0	SW of Dew	Freestone	TX	31.5742°N 96.1746°W	20:35–20:37	1.25 mi (2.01 km)	90 yd (82 m)
EF0	The tornado uprooted several trees.						
EF0	Dew	Freestone	TX	31.5929°N 96.1399°W	20:47–20:49	0.91 mi (1.46 km)	50 yd (46 m)
EF0	A home sustained significant roof damage. Several trees were also damaged by the tornado.						
EFU	SSW of Crowder	Pittsburg	OK	35.0776°N 95.6831°W	22:23–22:26	2 mi (3.2 km)	100 yd (91 m)
EFU	A well-photographed tornado formed on land before moving onto Lake Eufaula before dissipating. No damage was noted.						
EF1	NNW of Bedias to SW of Madisonville	Grimes, Madison	TX	30.8151°N 95.9716°W	23:25–23:37	4.32 mi (6.95 km)	50 yd (46 m)
EF1	Large tree limbs were downed along with a few uprooted and snapped trees. Some roof and garage damage occurred to homes, too.						
EFU	NNW of Eufaula	McIntosh	OK	35.3359°N 95.5943°W	23:50–23:51	1.3 mi (2.1 km)	75 yd (69 m)
EFU	A brief waterspout was observed on Lake Eufaula before dissipating. No damage was noted.						
EF1	Southern Shreveport	Caddo	LA	32.4076°N 93.8311°W	00:07–00:09	3.19 mi (5.13 km)	350 yd (320 m)
EF1	This weak tornado uprooted trees and downed limbs, including some that fell on and damaged structures. The weight training facility building at a high school had most of its roof covering removed with the debris being blown hundreds of yards to the north. Most of the damage from the tornado was rated EF0; the EF1 rating was based on a snapped wooden power pole and a very small area of more concentrated tree damage.						
EF0	NW of Plain Dealing	Bossier	LA	32.9491°N 93.7833°W	00:25–00:30	2.88 mi (4.63 km)	350 yd (320 m)
EF0	This high-end EF0 tornado uprooted trees and snapped large tree limbs.						
EF1	NNW of Plain Dealing	Bossier	LA	32.9897°N 93.7473°W	00:32–00:36	3.05 mi (4.91 km)	325 yd (297 m)
EF1	This tornado uprooted trees and snapped large limbs along most of its path as it moved northeastward. It snapped trees at the end of its path, earning it an EF1 rating. The tornado may have continued northeastward beyond its estimated endpoint, but down trees inhibited survey teams from accessing areas further to the northeast.						
EF0	NE of Plain Dealing	Bossier	LA	32.9519°N 93.6488°W	00:33–00:35	1.68 mi (2.70 km)	275 yd (251 m)
EF0	This high-end EF0 tornado uprooted trees and snapped large tree limbs.						
EF1	SE of Trinity	Trinity	TX	30.9102°N 95.316°W	00:35–00:36	0.29 mi (0.47 km)	200 yd (180 m)
EF1	1 death – A brief EF1 tornado impacted a subdivision of Trinity. A mobile home was destroyed, injuring both of its occupants, one of which later died from his injuries. Widespread damage to trees and vehicles also occurred in the subdivision.						
EF1	SW of Bradley	Lafayette	AR	33.0496°N 93.7644°W	00:37–00:38	0.79 mi (1.27 km)	275 yd (251 m)
EF1	This high-end EF1 tornado snapped power poles and destroyed the majority of a metal barn containing hay bales. Trees were snapped or uprooted as well.						
EF1	ESE of Bradley	Lafayette	AR	33.07°N 93.6°W	00:43–00:44	1.37 mi (2.20 km)	150 yd (140 m)
EF1	This low-end EF1 tornado snapped or uprooted trees. It may have started further to the southwest than indicated, but downed trees prevented survey teams from investigating that area.						
EF0	ESE of Heavener	LeFlore	OK	34.8428°N 94.6142°W	01:01–01:10	4.3 mi (6.9 km)	200 yd (180 m)
EF0	A tornado was observed by storm chasers. The only damage found was snapped tree limbs.						
EF0	S of Union City	Stone	MO	36.9646°N 93.4721°W	01:20–01:22	0.41 mi (0.66 km)	100 yd (91 m)
EF0	Trees were uprooted and a small barn was damaged.						
EFU	NE of Osage to SW of Carrollton	Carroll	AR	36.2144°N 93.3665°W	03:15–03:19	2.1 mi (3.4 km)	75 yd (69 m)
EFU	A tornado was caught on a local news station tower camera. The tornado occurred in inaccessible, heavily wooded terrain so no damage could be surveyed.						

== See also ==
- Weather of 2024
- List of North American tornadoes and tornado outbreaks
- List of F4 and EF4 tornadoes
  - List of F4 and EF4 tornadoes (2020–present)
- Tornadoes of 2024
- List of United States tornadoes in April 2024
