= Texas State Highway 22 =

State highway in Texas

State Highway 22

Route information
- Maintained by TxDOT
- Length: 111.215 mi (178.983 km)
- Existed: April 4, 1917–present

Major junctions
- West end: US 281 / SH 36 in Hamilton
- SH 6 in Meridian; I-35 in Hillsboro
- East end: Bus. SH 31 / FM 709 in Corsicana

Location
- Country: United States
- State: Texas
- Counties: Hamilton, Hill, Bosque, Navarro

Highway system
- Highways in Texas; Interstate; US; State; Former; Toll; Loops; Spurs; FM/RM; Park; Rec
← SH 21	→ SH 23

State Highway 22 (SH 22) is a 111.215-mile-long (178.983 km) state highway in the U.S. state of Texas that travels from Corsicana to Hamilton in the north central part of the state.

== History ==
Historic SH 22

SH 22 was one of the 25 original state highways proposed on June 21, 1917, along a path from Wichita Falls to Comanche. On August 18, 1917, plans had been extended from Comanche eastward to Hillsboro. On September 10, 1917, plans had been extended from Hillsboro eastward to Nacogdoches. On March 17, 1919, SH 22 was extended to Logansport. Construction was slow, and on August 21, 1923, most of the section from Wichita Falls to Comanche had been reassigned to SH 79 and SH 67, while SH 22 ran from De Leon to Corsicana. The section from Corsicana to Palestine was cancelled, the section from Palestine to Rusk was transferred to SH 43A, the section from Rusk to Nacogdoches was cancelled, and the section from Nacogdoches to Logansport was transferred to SH 76. On March 19, 1930, SH 22 was extended east to Timpson over SH 139, SH 43A, and SH 26B. The section from Comanche to De Leon was transferred to SH 81. On December 8, 1932, the section from Comanche to Hamilton was transferred to SH 36. On August 1, 1936, three routes called SH 22 Spur were designated to Blooming Grove, Frost, and Barry (which were taken over on March 21, 1938). On November 24, 1937, two more routes called SH 22 Spur to Brandon and Mertens were designated (which were taken over on May 23, 1938). On September 26, 1939, the part from Corsicana to Palestine had been transferred to US 287 and the part from Palestine to Timpson had been transferred to US 84, while SH 22 ran from Hamilton to Corsicana, and remained on this routing to this day. The five SH 22 Spur routes were renumbered Spur 30, Spur 31, Spur 32, Spur 55, and Spur 56.

== Major intersections ==
County	Location	mi	km	Destinations	Notes
Hamilton	Hamilton	0.0	0.0	SH 36 west (West Main Street) – Lamkin, Comanche	Continuation west beyond western termminus
Hamilton	Hamilton	0.0	0.0	US 281 – Hico, Lampasas	Western terminus; Western end of SH 36 concurrency
Hamilton	Hamilton	1.0	1.6	SH 36 south – Gatesville	East end of SH 36 overlap
Hamilton	Lanham	11.0	17.7	FM 1602 – Fairy, Jonesboro	
Bosque	Cranfills Gap	18.5	29.8	FM 219 east – Clifton	West end of FM 219 overlap
Bosque	Cranfills Gap	18.8	30.3	FM 219 west – Fairy	East end of FM 219 overlap
Bosque		26.3	42.3	FM 2136 east	
Bosque		30.3	48.8	PR 7 – Meridian State Park	
Bosque		31.1	50.1	FM 1473 west	
Bosque	Meridian	32.8	52.8	SH 6 – Hico, Valley Mills	
Bosque	Meridian	33.5	53.9	SH 144 north – Glen Rose	
Bosque	Meridian	33.9	54.6	SH 174 north – Cleburne	
Bosque	Meridian	34.3	55.2	FM 1991 south	
Bosque		46.4	74.7	FM 219 west – Clifton	
Bosque		47.9	77.1	FM 56 north – Lakewood Village	West end of FM 56 overlap
Bosque		49.9	80.3	FM 3118 north – Lake Whitney	
Bosque	Laguna Park	51.4	82.7	FM 56 south – Valley Mills	East end of FM 56 overlap
Hill	Whitney	58.4	94.0	FM 933 – Blum, Aquilla	
Hill		65.3	105.1	FM 1947 south	
Hill		69.5	111.8	FM 309 north	
Hill	Hillsboro	70.9	114.1	SH 171 north – Cleburne	West end of SH 171 overlap
Hill	Hillsboro	71.2	114.6	SH 81 north – Itasca	West end of SH 81 overlap
Hill	Hillsboro	71.7	115.4	SH 81 south – West	East end of SH 81 overlap
Hill	Hillsboro	73.7	118.6	I-35 – Dallas, Fort Worth, Waco	I-35 exit 368
Hill	Hillsboro	74.9	120.5	SH 171 south – Hubbard	East end of SH 171 overlap
Hill	Brandon	82.1	132.1	FM 1243 south	West end of FM 1243 overlap
Hill	Brandon	82.4	132.6	FM 1243 north	East end of FM 1243 overlap
Hill	Mertens	86.1	138.6	FM 308 – Milford, Irene	
Navarro		89.5	144.0	FM 639 south – Emmett	
Navarro	Frost	91.7	147.6	FM 667 – Italy, Navarro Mills Lake	
Navarro	Blooming Grove	96.9	155.9	FM 55 north – Avalon	West end of FM 55 overlap
Navarro	Blooming Grove	97.1	156.3	FM 55 south	East end of FM 55 overlap
Navarro	Barry	102.1	164.3	FM 1126 – Emhouse, Barry	
Navarro	Corsicana	108.0	173.8	FM 1839 north – Emhouse	
Navarro	Corsicana	108.8	175.1	FM 2555 south (45th Street)	
Navarro	Corsicana	109.2	175.7	FM 744 west	
Navarro	Corsicana	112.4	180.9	Bus. SH 31 (7th Avenue) to I-45 – Tyler, Waco	Eastern terminus; frormer SH 31; access to I-45 via Business SH 31 east
Navarro	Corsicana	112.4	180.9	FM 709 west (South 15th Street)	Continuation beyond eastern terminus
1.000 mi = 1.609 km; 1.000 km = 0.621 mi: Concurrency terminus

== See also ==
- List of state highways in Texas
- List of highways numbered 22
