= Alliance Hall, Texas =

Ghost town in Texas, US

Alliance Hall
- Ghost town
- Location in Texas
- Coordinates: 31°58′31″N 96°41′36″W
- Country: United States
- State: Texas
- County: Navarro

Alliance Hall is a ghost town in Navarro County, Texas, United States. Situated on Farm to Market Road 667, it was established in the 19th century. A school opened in 1906, later being consolidated by Blooming Grove Independent School District. It was abandoned by the 1960s.
