= Rice High School (Rice, Texas) =

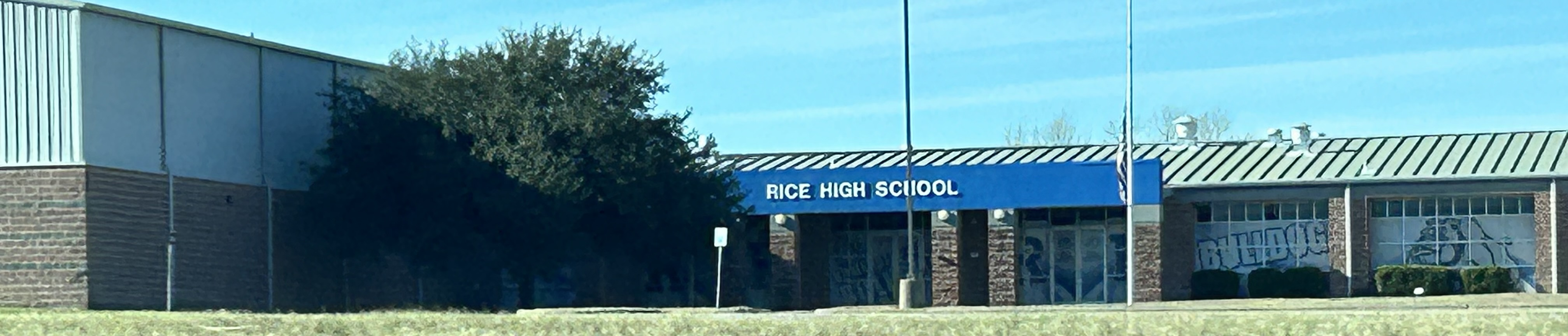
- The entrance of the school

Location
- 1400 Southwest McKinney Street; Rice, Texas 75155; United States; 32.2302°N 96.4914°W

Information
- School type: Public high school
- School district: Rice Independent School District
- Principal: Casey Sellers
- Teaching staff: 23.81 (FTE)
- Grades: 9-12
- Enrollment: 269 (2018–19)
- Student to teacher ratio: 11.30
- Colors: Royal blue, black, and white
- Athletics conference: UIL Class 3A
- Mascot: Bulldog/Lady Dog
- Yearbook: The Ranger
- Website: Rice High School

Rice High School is a public high school located in the city of Rice, Texas, USA and classified as a 3A school by the UIL. It is a part of the Rice Independent School District located in north central Navarro County. In 2015, the school was rated "Met Standard" by the Texas Education Agency.

== Athletics ==
The Rice Bulldogs compete in these sports:

- Volleyball
- Football
- Basketball
- Cross Country
- Powerlifting
- Baseball
- Softball
- Tennis
- Track

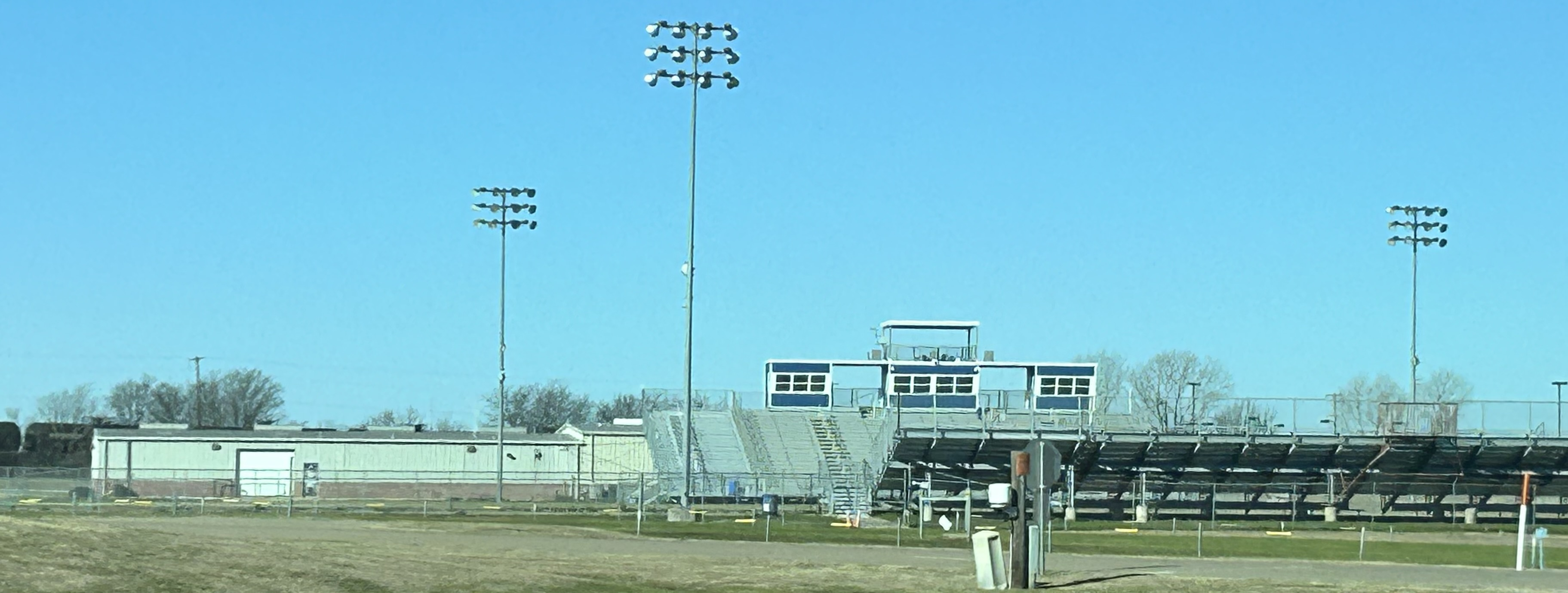
The home field of the Rice Bulldogs
