= Mertens, Texas =

- Town
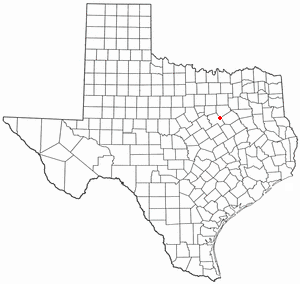
- Location of Mertens, Texas

- Coordinates: 32°03′32″N 96°53′38″W
- Country: United States
- State: Texas
- County: Hill

Area
  - Total: 0.44 sq mi (1.13 km^{2})
  - Land: 0.44 sq mi (1.13 km^{2})
  - Water: 0 sq mi (0.00 km^{2})
- Elevation: 522 ft (159 m)

Population (2020)
  - Total: 144
  - Density: 330/sq mi (127/km^{2})
- Time zone: UTC-6 (Central (CST))
  - Summer (DST): UTC-5 (CDT)
- ZIP code: 76666
- Area codes: 903, 430
- FIPS code: 48-47820
- GNIS feature ID: 2412987

Mertens is a town in Hill County, Texas, United States. It is located along State Highway 22. The population was 144 at the 2020 census.

== Geography ==
Mertens is located in eastern Hill County in Central Texas. The eastern border of the town in part is the Navarro County line. Via Highway 22, Hillsboro (the Hill county seat) is 14 miles (23 km) to the west and Corsicana is 26 miles (42 km) to the east.

According to the United States Census Bureau, Mertens has a total area of 0.42 square miles (1.1 km^{2}), of which 0.5 acres (1,987 m^{2}), or 0.18%, are water.

== Historical development ==
The first settlers arrived at this location in the late 1880s. During this time, the St. Louis Southwestern Railway was constructed through the area on its way from Corsicana to Hillsboro. The town's name originated from the engineer's wife of the first train that traveled though. In 1888, the post office opened, and within four years a bank was established, with the population just above 75 residents. The International–Great Northern Railroad reached the community on its way from Italy to Malone during this time, creating a crossroads with the railways. The town became incorporated in 1914, with electric power reaching the city the year after.

== Demographics ==
Historical population
Census	Pop.	Note	%±
1920	342		—
1930	338		−1.2%
1940	251		−25.7%
1950	210		−16.3%
1960	104		−50.5%
1970	109		4.8%
1980	133		22.0%
1990	104		−21.8%
2000	146		40.4%
2010	125		−14.4%
2020	144		15.2%
U.S. Decennial Census; 2020 Census

As of the census of 2000, there were 146 people, 58 households, and 42 families residing in the town. The population density was 332.3 inhabitants per square mile (128.3/km^{2}). There were 65 housing units at an average density of 148.0 per square mile (57.1/km^{2}). The racial makeup of the town was 84.25% White, 4.11% Native American, 10.96% from other races, and 0.68% from two or more races. Hispanic or Latino of any race were 17.81% of the population.

There were 58 households, out of which 27.6% had children under the age of 18 living with them, 60.3% were married couples living together, 8.6% had a female householder with no husband present, and 25.9% were non-families. 25.9% of all households were made up of individuals, and 15.5% had someone living alone who was 65 years of age or older. The average household size was 2.52 and the average family size was 2.98.

In the town, the population was spread out, with 25.3% under the age of 18, 6.2% from 18 to 24, 24.7% from 25 to 44, 24.0% from 45 to 64, and 19.9% who were 65 years of age or older. The median age was 40 years. For every 100 females, there were 111.6 males. For every 100 females age 18 and over, there were 91.2 males.

The median income for a household in the town was $31,250, and the median income for a family was $36,667. Males had a median income of $29,500 versus $21,250 for females. The per capita income for the town was $13,422. There were 12.0% of families and 23.4% of the population living below the poverty line, including 51.4% of under eighteens and 13.2% of those over 64.

== Education ==
Mertens is served by the Frost Independent School District.
