= Rush Creek, Navarro County, Texas =

Coordinates: 32.0750°N 96.2465°W

Rush Creek is a ghost town in Navarro County, Texas, United States.

== History ==
Rush Creek was established in the 1850s. A post office was established in 1858 and was discontinued in 1871. In the mid-1870s Rush Creek was abandoned. It was named for a stream that ran through the area.
