= Blooming Grove High School =

Coordinates: 32.0882°N 96.7139°W

Location
- 212 W Grady St. Blooming Grove, Texas 76626-0258; United States

Information
- School type: Public High School
- School district: Blooming Grove Independent School District
- Principal: John Paul Gillen
- Teaching staff: 24.67 (FTE)
- Grades: 9-12
- Enrollment: 279 (2023–2024)
- Student to teacher ratio: 11.31
- Colors: Blue & White
- Athletics conference: UIL Class 3A D2
- Mascot: Lion
- Website: hs.bgisd.org

Blooming Grove High School is a 3A public high school located in Blooming Grove, Texas. It is part of the Blooming Grove Independent School District located in northwest Navarro County. In 2011, the school was rated "Academically Acceptable" by the Texas Education Agency.

== Athletics ==
The Blooming Grove Lions compete in various sports, including cross country, volleyball, football, basketball, powerlifting, track, softball, and baseball.

State titles

- Softball – 1996 (2A)
- One Act Play – 1965 (B)

State finalists

- Softball – 1997 (2A), 1998 (2A)
