= Montfort, Texas =

Ghost town in Texas, United States

Coordinates: 32°13′21″N 96°20′58″W

Montfort was an unincorporated community in northeastern Navarro County, Texas, eleven miles (18 km) northeast of Corsicana, Texas. The community was located along Farm to Market Road 636 just east of Interstate 45.

== History ==
Montfort was established in the late 1890s and named for James Theodoric Montfort. He and his brothers owned about 1,800 acres (7.3 km^{2}) together. A post office operated from 1896 until 1904. Montfort was never very large. There was a cotton gin, a blacksmith shop, and a general store. In the mid-1930s, Montfort had only a couple of stores, a school, and few houses; the population in 1936 was fifteen. After World War II, the stores closed, and the school was consolidated with the Roane school. By the mid-1960s only a few scattered houses remained.
