= Navarro Mills Lake =

Lake in Texas

Navarro Mills Lake is located in Navarro County, Texas. It is located 20 miles west of Corsicana, and about 35 miles east of Waco.

== History ==
The lake is owned by the U.S. Government and operated by the U.S. Army Corps of Engineers. Construction of the lake began in January 1959, and it was completed in March 1963. The total cost was $9.5 million. It was built for flood protection and to sustain the water demand for the potential population growth. The lake has a maximum depth of 49 feet.

== Hydrology ==
The Navarro Mills Lake has the Trinity River and Richland Creek impounded. The lake has the surface area 5,070 acres. The dam and spillway is approximately 7,570 feet long embankment and it has a maximum height of 81.7 feet. The spillway is maintained by 6 tainter gates that are 40 feet wide and 29 feet tall and the top of the gates have an elevation of 414 feet above mean sea level. The dam has a drainage area of 320 square miles.

== Terrestrial ecosystem ==
=== Fish ===
- White Bass
- Channel Catfish
- Crappie

=== Plants ===
- Cattails
- Floating Pondweed

== Recreation ==
Navarro Mills Lake has eight recreational areas and of the eight recreational areas four of them have camping and boat ramps. The other areas at the lake offer recreational activities such as fishing and swimming.
