= Frost Independent School District =

School district in Texas

Location
- Frost, TX ESC Region 12 USA

District information
- Type: Public
- Grades: Pre-K through 12
- Superintendent: Duane Limbaugh

Students and staff
- Athletic conference: UIL Class A
- Colors: blue and white

Other information
- Mascot: polar bear
- Website: Frost ISD

Frost Independent School District is a public school district based in Frost, Texas (USA).

In addition to Frost, the district serves the town of Mertens in Hill County as well as rural areas in western Navarro County. A small portion of southern Ellis County also lies within the district.

Frost ISD has two campuses - Frost High (Grades 7-12) and Frost Elementary (Grades PK-6). The school mascot (appropriate for the school name) is the Polar Bear.

In 2009, the school district was rated "academically acceptable" by the Texas Education Agency.
