= Rice Independent School District =

School district in Texas

Rice Independent School District is a public school district based in Rice, Texas (USA).

The district has three schools - Rice High School (Grades 9-12), Rice Intermediate Middle School (Grades 5-8) and Rice Elementary School (Grades PK-4). The district spans 437 square miles (1131Km). The school colors are Blue and White, often using Black and Gray as a third color. The mascot is a Bulldog.

In 2009, the school district was rated "academically acceptable" by the Texas Education Agency.
