= Emmett, Texas =

Unincorporated community in Texas, US

Coordinates: 31°59′16″N 96°47′34″W

Emmett in Texas, United States, is an unincorporated community 21 miles (34 km) west of Corsicana in western Navarro County. Settled shortly after the Civil War, Emmett grew to approximately 250 people by 1900 with a school, a blacksmith shop, a grocery store, and two corn mill/cotton gins. After a railroad line was installed through nearby Frost, the population dispersed and dwindled. In 1990, an estimated 100 people still lived in the rural areas of Emmett, but the commercial aspects of the town no longer existed.
