= Blooming Grove Independent School District =

Public school district in Texas, United States

Coordinates: 32°05′17″N 96°42′50″W

Location
- Blooming Grove, Texas ESC Region 12 United States

District information
- Type: Independent school district
- Grades: Pre-K through 12
- Superintendent: Jack Lee
- Schools: 4 (2009-10)
- NCES District ID: 4810470

Students and staff
- Students: 836 (2010-11)
- Teachers: 64.08 (2009-10) (on full-time equivalent (FTE) basis)
- Student–teacher ratio: 12.98 (2009-10)
- Athletic conference: UIL Class 3A Football Division II
- District mascot: Lions
- Colors: Royal Blue, White, Grey

Other information
- TEA District Accountability Rating for 2011-12: Academically Acceptable
- Website: Blooming Grove ISD

Blooming Grove Independent School District is a public school district based in Blooming Grove, Texas, United States. In addition to Blooming Grove, the district serves the cities of Barry and Emhouse as well as rural areas in west central Navarro County.

== Finances ==
As of the 2010-2011 school year, the appraised valuation of property in the district was $123,193,000. The maintenance tax rate was $0.104 and the bond tax rate was $0.009 per $100 of appraised valuation.

== Academic achievement ==
In 2011, the school district was rated "academically acceptable" by the Texas Education Agency. Forty-nine percent of districts in Texas in 2011 received the same rating. No state accountability ratings were given to districts in 2012. A school district in Texas can receive one of four possible rankings from the Texas Education Agency: Exemplary (the highest possible ranking), Recognized, Academically Acceptable, and Academically Unacceptable (the lowest possible ranking).

Historical district TEA accountability ratings

- 2011: Academically Acceptable
- 2010: Recognized
- 2009: Recognized
- 2008: Academically Acceptable
- 2007: Academically Acceptable
- 2006: Academically Acceptable
- 2005: Academically Acceptable
- 2004: Academically Acceptable

== Schools ==
In the school year 2011-2012, Blooming Grove ISD had students in four schools.
Regular instructional

- Blooming Grove High School (Grades 9-12),
- Blooming Grove Junior High School (Grades 6-8)
- Blooming Grove Elementary School (Grades PK-5)

DAEP instructional

- Navarro County DAEP/ABC

== Special programs ==
=== Athletics ===
Blooming Grove High School participates in the boys sports of baseball, basketball, football, and wrestling. The school participates in the girls sports of basketball, softball, and volleyball. For the 2014 through 2016 school years, Blooming Grove High School will play football in UIL Class 3A Division II.

== See also ==
- List of school districts in Texas
- List of high schools in Texas
