= Rice, Texas =

- City
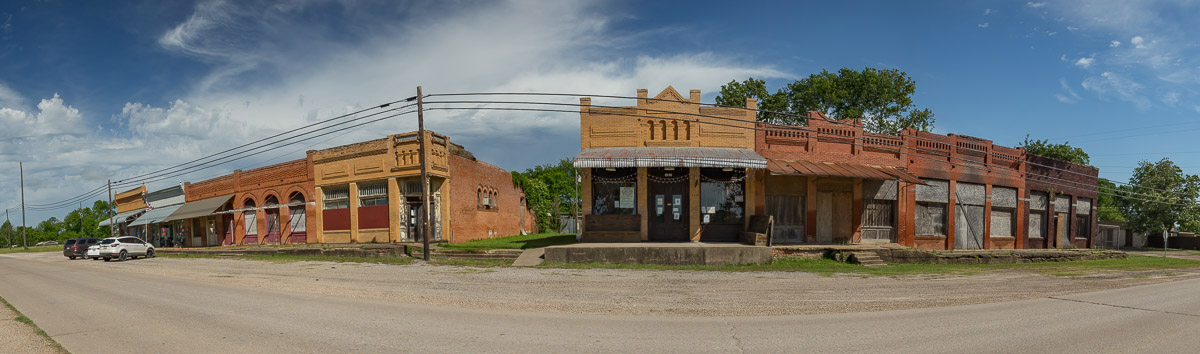
- Old buildings on Calhoun Street

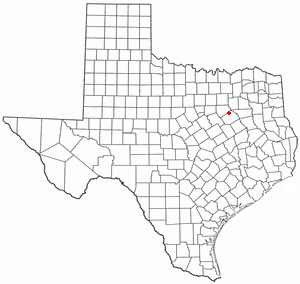
- Location of Rice, Texas

- Coordinates: 32°14′45″N 96°29′54″W
- Country: United States
- State: Texas
- County: Navarro

Area
  - Total: 2.75 sq mi (7.13 km^{2})
  - Land: 2.67 sq mi (6.92 km^{2})
  - Water: 0.081 sq mi (0.21 km^{2})
- Elevation: 459 ft (140 m)

Population (2020)
  - Total: 1,203
  - Density: 450/sq mi (174/km^{2})
- Time zone: UTC-6 (Central (CST))
  - Summer (DST): UTC-5 (CDT)
- Area codes: 903, 430
- FIPS code: 48-61736
- GNIS feature ID: 2410932
- Website: www.ricetx.gov

Historical population
Census	Pop.	Note	%±
1920	611		—
1930	591		−3.3%
1940	489		−17.3%
1950	396		−19.0%
1960	295		−25.5%
1970	284		−3.7%
1980	432		52.1%
1990	564		30.6%
2000	798		41.5%
2010	923		15.7%
2020	1,203		30.3%
U.S. Decennial Census

Rice is a city in Navarro County, Texas, United States. The population was 1,203 at the 2020 census.

== History ==
The city's namesake is William Marsh Rice, who donated the land for a community school. He is the same person who founded Rice University. Its unofficial motto is "The city so nice, they named it Rice."

== Geography ==
According to the United States Census Bureau, the city has a total area of 2.8 square miles (7.3 km^{2}), of which 2.7 square miles (7.0 km^{2}) is land and 0.1 square miles (0.26 km^{2}) (3.21%) is water.

=== Climate ===
The climate in this area is characterized by hot, humid summers and generally mild to cool winters. According to the Köppen Climate Classification system, Rice has a humid subtropical climate, abbreviated "Cfa" on climate maps.

== Demographics ==
=== 2020 census ===
As of the 2020 census, Rice had a population of 1,203, 368 households, and 297 families residing in the city. The median age was 31.1 years, with 32.3% of residents under the age of 18 and 8.9% of residents 65 years of age or older. For every 100 females there were 91.3 males, and for every 100 females age 18 and over there were 90.2 males age 18 and over.

As of the 2020 census, 0.0% of residents lived in urban areas, while 100.0% lived in rural areas.

Of the 368 households in Rice, 46.7% had children under the age of 18 living in them, 54.1% were married-couple households, 16.3% had a male householder with no spouse or partner present, and 19.8% had a female householder with no spouse or partner present. About 15.8% of all households were made up of individuals and 4.9% had someone living alone who was 65 years of age or older.

There were 394 housing units, of which 6.6% were vacant. The homeowner vacancy rate was 0.4% and the rental vacancy rate was 8.0%.

Racial composition as of the 2020 census
Race	Number	Percent
White	694	57.7%
Black or African American	66	5.5%
American Indian and Alaska Native	7	0.6%
Asian	1	0.1%
Native Hawaiian and Other Pacific Islander	4	0.3%
Some other race	205	17.0%
Two or more races	226	18.8%
Hispanic or Latino (of any race)	503	41.8%

=== 2000 census ===
As of the census of 2000, there were 798 people, 260 households, and 215 families residing in the city. The population density was 294.9 inhabitants per square mile (113.9/km^{2}). There were 371 housing units at an average density of 137.1 per square mile (52.9/km^{2}). The racial makeup of the city was 76.32% White, 9.77% African American, 0.25% Native American, 12.53% from other races, and 1.13% from two or more races. Hispanic or Latino of any race were 17.54% of the population.

There were 260 households, out of which 48.8% had children under the age of 18 living with them, 61.2% were married couples living together, 14.6% had a female householder with no husband present, and 17.3% were non-families. 11.9% of all households were made up of individuals, and 4.2% had someone living alone who was 65 years of age or older. The average household size was 3.07 and the average family size was 3.33.

In the city, the population was spread out, with 33.8% under the age of 18, 8.5% from 18 to 24, 35.0% from 25 to 44, 15.8% from 45 to 64, and 6.9% who were 65 years of age or older. The median age was 30 years. For every 100 females, there were 91.4 males. For every 100 females age 18 and over, there were 91.3 males.

The median income for a household in the city was $31,875, and the median income for a family was $33,375. Males had a median income of $28,375 versus $20,250 for females. The per capita income for the city was $11,616. About 17.1% of families and 15.6% of the population were below the poverty line, including 7.0% of those under age 18 and 36.0% of those age 65 or over.

== Education ==
The City of Rice is served by the Rice Independent School District.
