= Frost, Texas =

- City
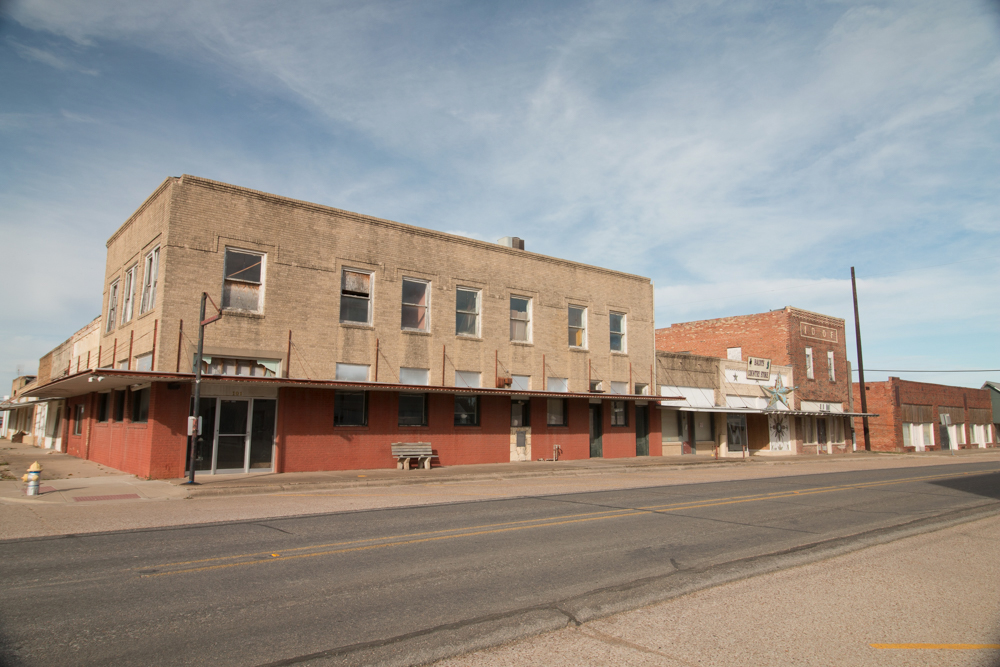
- Downtown Frost (2017)

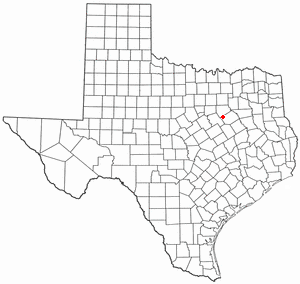
- Location of Frost, Texas

- Coordinates: 32°04′44″N 96°48′31″W
- Country: United States
- State: Texas
- County: Navarro

Area
  - Total: 1.14 sq mi (2.94 km^{2})
  - Land: 1.13 sq mi (2.93 km^{2})
  - Water: 0.0039 sq mi (0.01 km^{2})
- Elevation: 522 ft (159 m)

Population (2020)
  - Total: 620
  - Density: 550/sq mi (210/km^{2})
- Time zone: UTC-6 (Central (CST))
  - Summer (DST): UTC-5 (CDT)
- ZIP code: 76641
- Area codes: 903, 430
- FIPS code: 48-27768
- GNIS feature ID: 2410551
- Website: https://cityoffrost.municipalimpact.com/

Frost is a city in Navarro County, Texas, United States. The population was 620 at the 2020 census.

== History ==
Frost was founded by fifth generation Texan, Miles Frost in 1899 as a trading post for north central Texas farmers.

The town was established in 1881 when the St. Louis Southwestern Railway was constructed through Frost on its way from Corsicana to Hillsboro. It was named after Samuel R. Frost, attorney for the railroad and a prominent local politician.

== Geography ==
According to the United States Census Bureau, the city has a total area of 1.1 square miles (2.8 km^{2}), of which 1.1 square miles (2.8 km^{2}) is land and 0.88% is water.

== Demographics ==
Historical population
Census	Pop.	Note	%±
1900	621		—
1910	702		13.0%
1920	913		30.1%
1930	748		−18.1%
1940	671		−10.3%
1950	585		−12.8%
1960	508		−13.2%
1970	548		7.9%
1980	564		2.9%
1990	579		2.7%
2000	648		11.9%
2010	643		−0.8%
2020	620		−3.6%
U.S. Decennial Census; 2020 Census

=== 2020 census ===
As of the 2020 census, Frost had a population of 620. The median age was 33.0 years. 31.3% of residents were under the age of 18 and 12.6% of residents were 65 years of age or older. For every 100 females there were 96.8 males, and for every 100 females age 18 and over there were 101.9 males age 18 and over.

0.0% of residents lived in urban areas, while 100.0% lived in rural areas.

There were 221 households in Frost, of which 43.4% had children under the age of 18 living in them. Of all households, 48.9% were married-couple households, 16.3% were households with a male householder and no spouse or partner present, and 29.4% were households with a female householder and no spouse or partner present. About 20.8% of all households were made up of individuals and 10.4% had someone living alone who was 65 years of age or older.

There were 246 housing units, of which 10.2% were vacant. The homeowner vacancy rate was 1.2% and the rental vacancy rate was 7.1%.

Racial composition as of the 2020 census
Race	Number	Percent
White	387	62.4%
Black or African American	24	3.9%
American Indian and Alaska Native	5	0.8%
Asian	2	0.3%
Native Hawaiian and Other Pacific Islander	0	0.0%
Some other race	110	17.7%
Two or more races	92	14.8%
Hispanic or Latino (of any race)	199	32.1%

=== 2022 American Community Survey estimates ===
The 2022 American Community Survey 5-year estimates reported a median household income of $78,000, a median family income of $77,500, a median income for non-family households of $68,750, and a per capita income of $25,312. Males working full-time jobs had median earnings of $65,625 compared to $39,286 for females.

Out of the 729 people with a determined poverty status, 10.4% were below the poverty line; 9.7% of minors and 3.2% of seniors were below the poverty line.

The same survey recorded residents self-identifying with various ethnic ancestries. People of American descent made up 7.8% of the population of the town, followed by Irish at 7.7%, English at 7.0%, German at 5.3%, Hungarian at 2.4%, Scotch-Irish at 1.5%, Scottish at 1.4%, Swedish at 1.2%, and French at 0.9%.

== Education ==
The City of Frost is served by the Frost Independent School District.

== Climate ==
The climate in this area is characterized by hot, humid summers and generally mild to cool winters. According to the Köppen Climate Classification system, Frost has a humid subtropical climate, abbreviated "Cfa" on climate maps.

== Cultural references ==
On May 6, 1930, a tornado struck the city, destroying many buildings and leaving 41 dead. The event was commemorated in the song "Frost Texas Tornado Blues" by Texas Alexander and the Mississippi Sheiks, recorded April 9, 1934 in San Antonio, Texas on the Okeh label.

== Photo Gallery ==
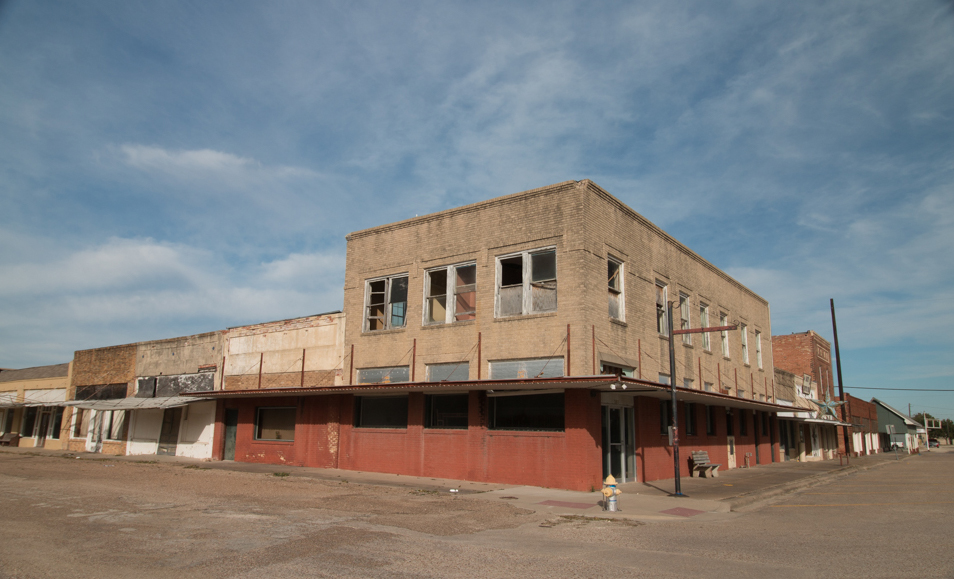
Downtown Frost

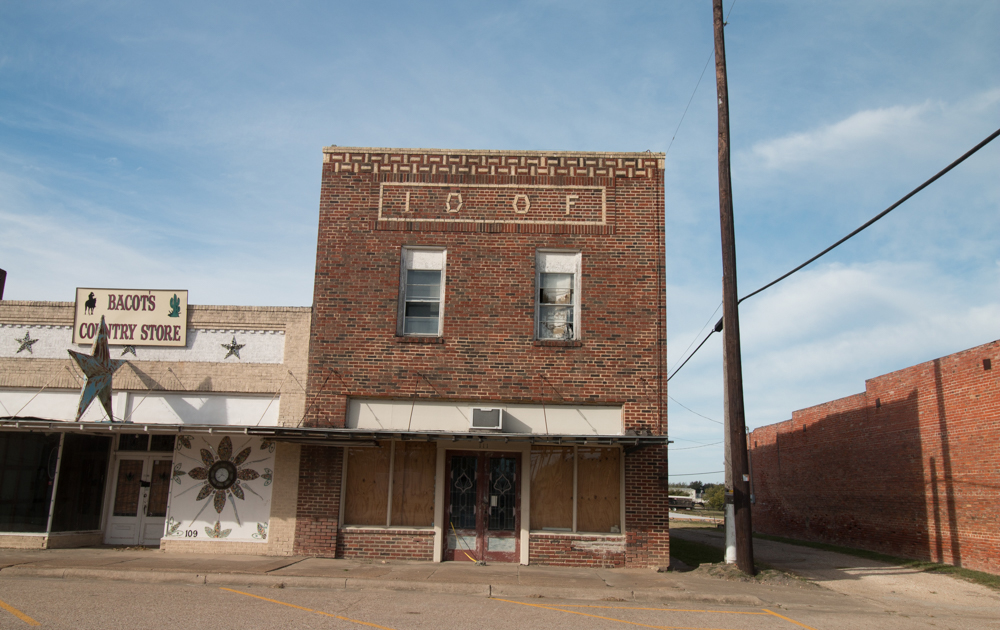
Downtown Frost

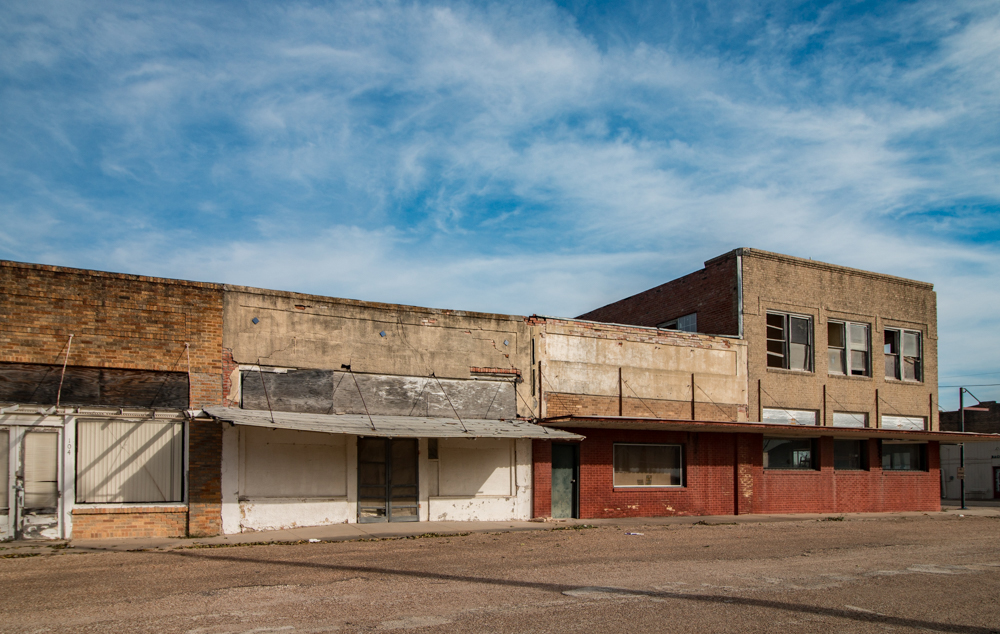
Downtown Frost

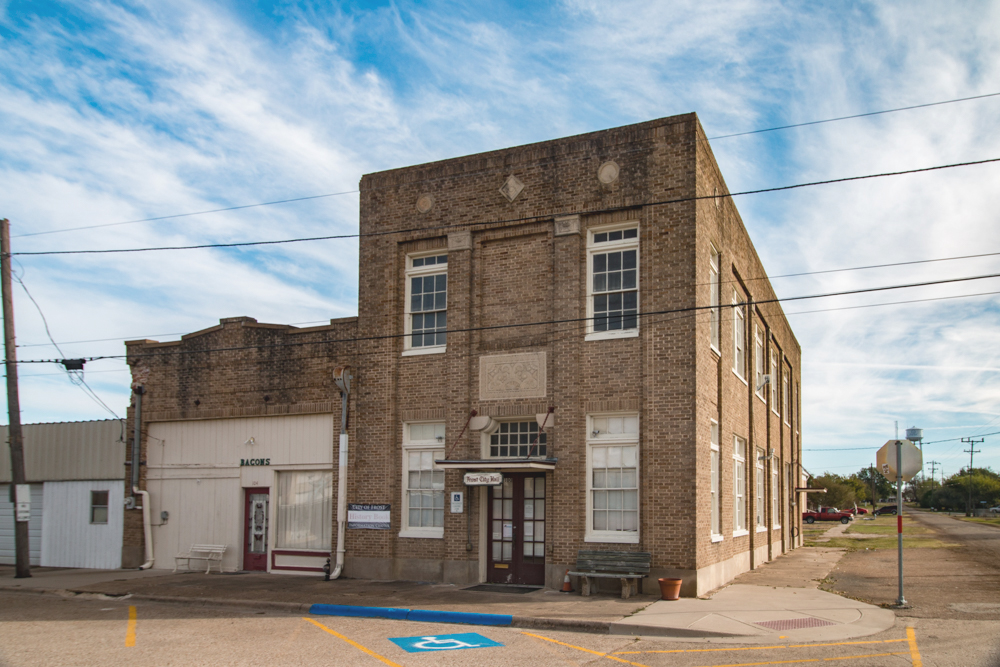
City Hall
