= Barry, Texas =

- City
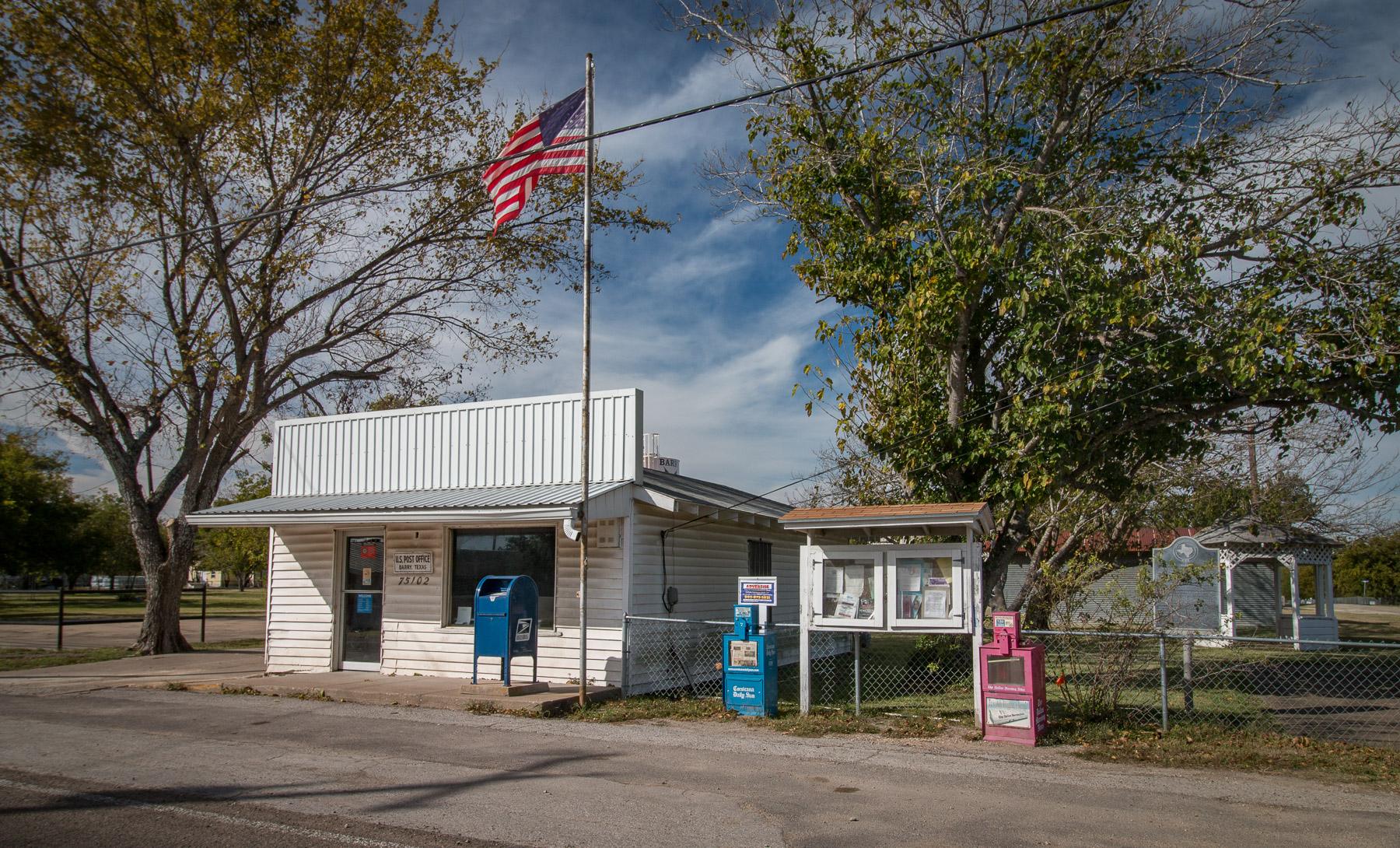
- Post office in Barry, Texas
- Interactive map of Barry, Texas
- Coordinates: 32°06′00″N 96°38′16″W
- Country: United States
- State: Texas
- County: Navarro

Area
  - Total: 0.45 sq mi (1.16 km^{2})
  - Land: 0.44 sq mi (1.14 km^{2})
  - Water: 0.0077 sq mi (0.02 km^{2})
- Elevation: 499 ft (152 m)

Population (2020)
  - Total: 220
  - Density: 500/sq mi (190/km^{2})
- Time zone: UTC-6 (Central (CST))
  - Summer (DST): UTC-5 (CDT)
- ZIP code: 75102
- Area codes: 903, 430
- FIPS code: 48-05708
- GNIS feature ID: 2409789

Barry is a city in Navarro County, in the U.S. state of Texas. The population was 220 at the 2020 census.

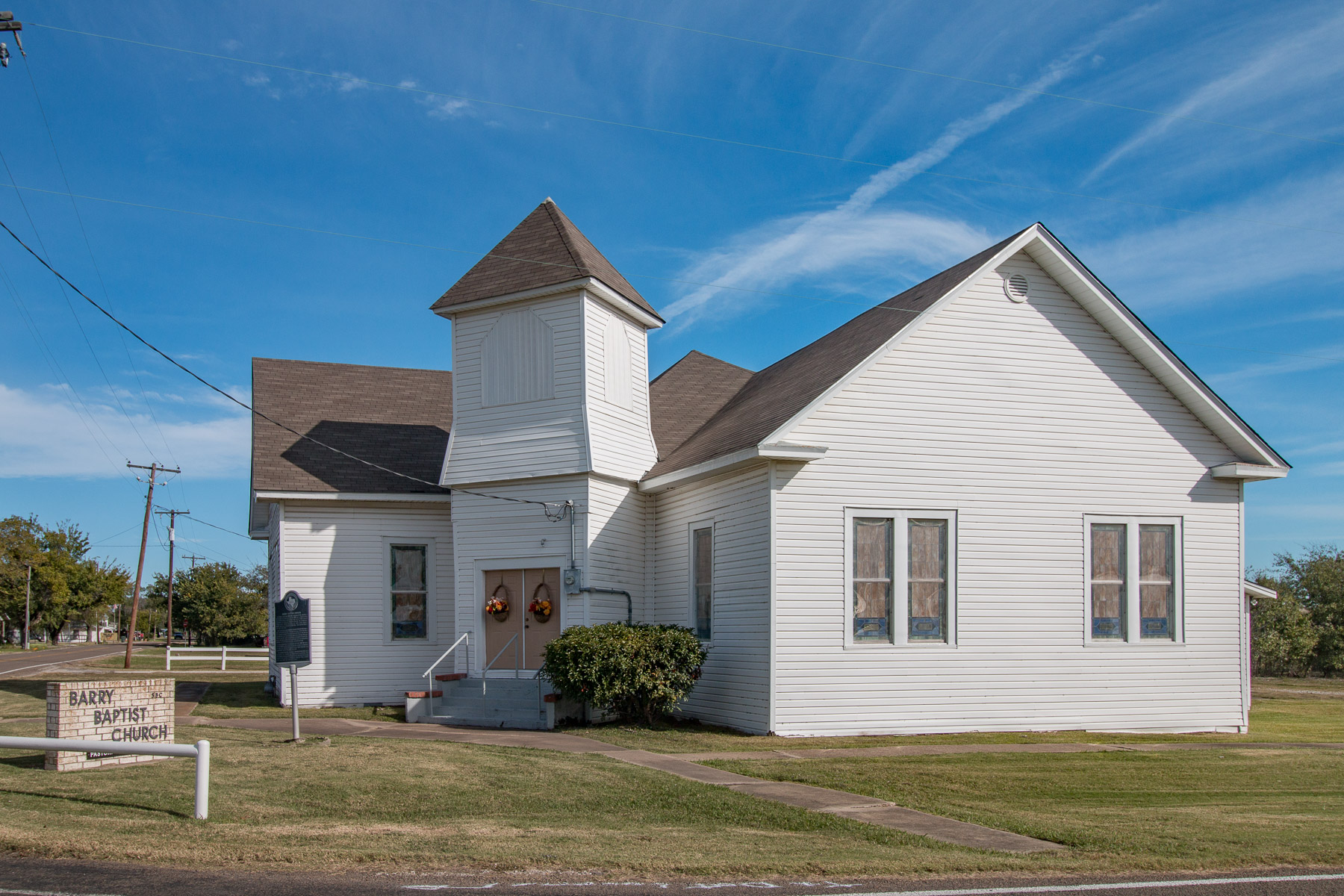
Barry Baptist Church

== History ==
Established in 1886, the city was named after Bryan T. Barry, an early landowner who sold 300 acres to settlers. Its original location was a mile south of its present site. After the St. Louis Southwestern Railway completed a line between Corsicana and Hillsboro in 1888, residents moved to the present location near the railroad tracks. A public school opened in 1896 to serve the settlement, which also had a post office, general store and gin. By 1914, the community of 400 residents had two banks, a newspaper, hotel, stores, eateries, a blacksmith, and three churches. A Masonic lodge was later founded. The Barry school merged with nearby Blooming Grove in 1958.

== Geography ==
According to the United States Census Bureau, the city has a total area of 0.45 square miles (1.2 km^{2}), of which 0.44 square miles (1.1 km^{2}) is land.

== Demographics ==
Historical population
| Census | Pop. | Note | %± |
|---|---|---|---|
| 1960 | 178 | | — |
| 1970 | 149 | | −16.3% |
| 1980 | 192 | | 28.9% |
| 1990 | 175 | | −8.9% |
| 2000 | 209 | | 19.4% |
| 2010 | 242 | | 15.8% |
| 2020 | 220 | | −9.1% |
U.S. Decennial Census; 2020 Census

=== 2020 census ===
As of the 2020 census, Barry had a population of 220. The median age was 37.2 years, 25.0% of residents were under the age of 18, and 15.5% were 65 years of age or older. For every 100 females there were 91.3 males, and for every 100 females age 18 and over there were 96.4 males age 18 and over.

0% of residents lived in urban areas, while 100.0% lived in rural areas.

There were 80 households in Barry, of which 40.0% had children under the age of 18 living in them. Of all households, 56.3% were married-couple households, 12.5% were households with a male householder and no spouse or partner present, and 21.3% were households with a female householder and no spouse or partner present. About 10.0% of all households were made up of individuals and 5.1% had someone living alone who was 65 years of age or older.

There were 92 housing units, of which 13.0% were vacant. Among occupied housing units, 70.0% were owner-occupied and 30.0% were renter-occupied. The homeowner vacancy rate was 3.2% and the rental vacancy rate was <0.1%.

Racial composition as of the 2020 census
| Race | Percent |
|---|---|
| White | 60.5% |
| Black or African American | 4.5% |
| American Indian and Alaska Native | 0% |
| Asian | 0% |
| Native Hawaiian and Other Pacific Islander | 0.9% |
| Some other race | 19.1% |
| Two or more races | 15.0% |
| Hispanic or Latino (of any race) | 33.6% |

=== 2000 census ===
As of the census of 2000, there were 209 people, 80 households, and 56 families residing in the city. The population density was 467.2 inhabitants per square mile (180.4/km^{2}). There were 86 housing units at an average density of 192.2 per square mile (74.2/km^{2}). The racial makeup of the city was 88.52% White, 3.35% African American, 0.48% Native American, 7.18% from other races, and 0.48% from two or more races. Hispanic or Latino of any race were 9.09% of the population.

There were 80 households, out of which 27.5% had children under the age of 18 living with them, 56.3% were married couples living together, 12.5% had a female householder with no husband present, and 30.0% were non-families. 25.0% of all households were made up of individuals, and 15.0% had someone living alone who was 65 years of age or older. The average household size was 2.61 and the average family size was 3.07.

In the city, the population was spread out, with 23.0% under the age of 18, 7.7% from 18 to 24, 28.7% from 25 to 44, 25.4% from 45 to 64, and 15.3% who were 65 years of age or older. The median age was 37 years. For every 100 females, there were 99.0 males. For every 100 females age 18 and over, there were 96.3 males.

The median income for a household in the city was $40,000, and the median income for a family was $42,500. Males had a median income of $24,375 versus $20,625 for females. The per capita income for the city was $20,247. About 6.1% of families and 8.0% of the population were below the poverty line, including 11.3% of those under the age of eighteen and 13.0% of those 65 or over.

== Education ==
The City of Barry is served by the Blooming Grove Independent School District.
