= Emhouse, Texas =

- Town
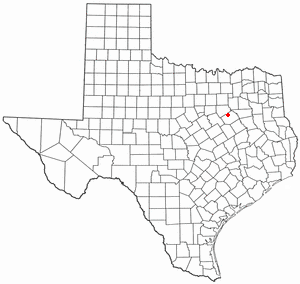
- Location of Emhouse, Texas

- Coordinates: 32°09′39″N 96°34′38″W
- Country: United States
- State: Texas
- County: Navarro

Area
  - Total: 0.27 sq mi (0.69 km^{2})
  - Land: 0.27 sq mi (0.69 km^{2})
  - Water: 0 sq mi (0.00 km^{2})
- Elevation: 469 ft (143 m)

Population (2020)
  - Total: 187
  - Density: 700/sq mi (270/km^{2})
- Time zone: UTC-6 (Central (CST))
  - Summer (DST): UTC-5 (CDT)
- FIPS code: 48-24168
- GNIS feature ID: 2412484

Emhouse is a town in Navarro County, Texas, United States. The population was 187 at the 2020 census.

It was originally called Lyford when laid out around 1906 around the railroad right of way. Since another Lyford, Texas existed already, it was renamed after Col. Edward M. House, then superintendent of the Trinity and Brazos Valley Railway.

== Geography ==
According to the United States Census Bureau, the town has a total area of 0.3 square miles (0.78 km^{2}), all land.

== Demographics ==
Historical population
Census	Pop.	Note	%±
1920	347		—
1930	322		−7.2%
1940	281		−12.7%
1950	198		−29.5%
1960	170		−14.1%
1970	158		−7.1%
1980	197		24.7%
1990	195		−1.0%
2000	159		−18.5%
2010	133		−16.4%
2020	187		40.6%
U.S. Decennial Census; 2020 Census

As of the census of 2000, there were 159 people, 50 households, and 40 families residing in the town. The population density was 591.7 inhabitants per square mile (228.5/km^{2}). There were 59 housing units at an average density of 219.6 per square mile (84.8/km^{2}). The racial makeup of the town was 81.76% White, 6.29% African American, 4.40% from other races, and 7.55% from two or more races. Hispanic or Latino of any race were 11.32% of the population.

There were 50 households, out of which 44.0% had children under the age of 18 living with them, 58.0% were married couples living together, 10.0% had a female householder with no husband present, and 20.0% were non-families. 18.0% of all households were made up of individuals, and 6.0% had someone living alone who was 65 years of age or older. The average household size was 3.18 and the average family size was 3.53.

In the town, the population was spread out, with 35.2% under the age of 18, 3.1% from 18 to 24, 28.9% from 25 to 44, 23.9% from 45 to 64, and 8.8% who were 65 years of age or older. The median age was 34 years. For every 100 females, there were 112.0 males. For every 100 females age 18 and over, there were 94.3 males.

The median income for a household in the town was $38,750, and the median income for a family was $26,094. Males had a median income of $34,500 versus $21,136 for females. The per capita income for the town was $11,313. None of the families and 1.2% of the population were living below the poverty line.

== Education ==
The Town of Emhouse is served by the Blooming Grove Independent School District.
