= Blooming Grove, Texas =

- Town
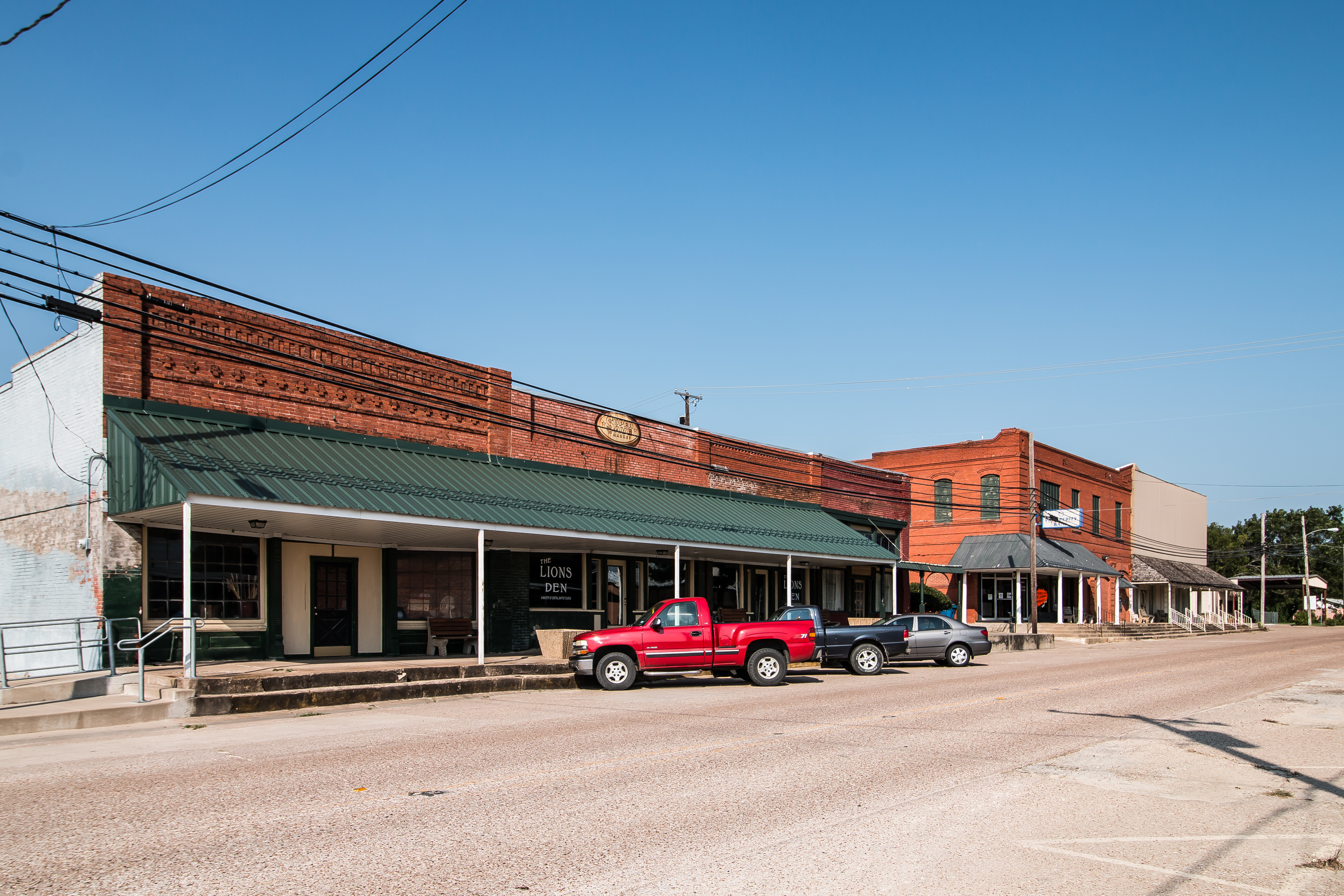
- Interactive map of Blooming Grove, Texas
- Coordinates: 32°05′33″N 96°43′02″W
- Country: United States
- State: Texas
- County: Navarro

Area
  - Total: 0.86 sq mi (2.22 km^{2})
  - Land: 0.86 sq mi (2.22 km^{2})
  - Water: 0 sq mi (0.00 km^{2})
- Elevation: 600 ft (180 m)

Population (2020)
  - Total: 857
  - Density: 1,000/sq mi (386/km^{2})
- Time zone: UTC-6 (Central (CST))
  - Summer (DST): UTC-5 (CDT)
- ZIP code: 76626
- Area codes: 903, 430
- FIPS code: 48-08788
- GNIS feature ID: 2411699
- Website: ci.blooming-grove.tx.us

Blooming Grove is a town in western Navarro County, Texas, United States. As of the 2020 census, the town population was 857, up from 821 in the 2010 census.

== Geography ==
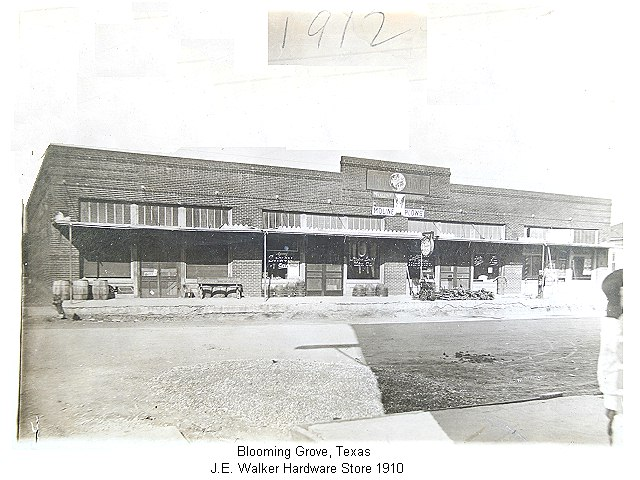
Walker's Hardware Store Fordyce ST, Blooming Grove, Texas

According to the United States Census Bureau, the town has a total area of 0.9 square miles (2.3 km^{2}), all land.

According to History of Navarro County, Blooming Grove was a portmanteau of Dr. John Marion Davis' son's name, Price Blum Davis, and a grove of trees near Gradyville, the previous name. The name change took place just after the Civil War.

== Demographics ==
Historical population
Census	Pop.	Note	%±
1880	79		—
1890	175		121.5%
1900	585		234.3%
1910	903		54.4%
1920	898		−0.6%
1930	771		−14.1%
1940	821		6.5%
1950	736		−10.4%
1960	729		−1.0%
1970	740		1.5%
1980	823		11.2%
1990	847		2.9%
2000	833		−1.7%
2010	821		−1.4%
2020	857		4.4%
U.S. Decennial Census

At the 2000 census there were 833 people, 342 households, and 233 families in the town. The population density was 975.1 inhabitants per square mile (376.5/km^{2}). There were 373 housing units at an average density of 436.6 per square mile (168.6/km^{2}). The racial makeup of the town was 91.24% White, 5.28% African American, 0.36% Native American, 1.32% from other races, and 1.80% from two or more races. Hispanic or Latino of any race were 4.32%.

Of the 342 households 31.9% had children under the age of 18 living with them, 54.1% were married couples living together, 11.1% had a female householder with no husband present, and 31.6% were non-families. 29.2% of households were one person and 16.1% were one person aged 65 or older. The average household size was 2.44 and the average family size was 3.00.

The age distribution was 26.4% under the age of 18, 5.6% from 18 to 24, 29.8% from 25 to 44, 18.6% from 45 to 64, and 19.6% 65 or older. The median age was 38 years. For every 100 females, there were 83.1 males. For every 100 females age 18 and over, there were 81.4 males.

The median household income was $32,375 and the median family income was $46,364. Males had a median income of $35,000 versus $22,059 for females. The per capita income for the town was $17,747. About 12.7% of families and 17.7% of the population were below the poverty line, including 17.6% of those under age 18 and 16.7% of those age 65 or over.

== Education ==
The Town of Blooming Grove is served by the Blooming Grove Independent School District and home to the Blooming Grove High School Lions.

== See also ==
- List of towns in Texas
