= Navarro County, Texas =

County in Texas, United States

- County
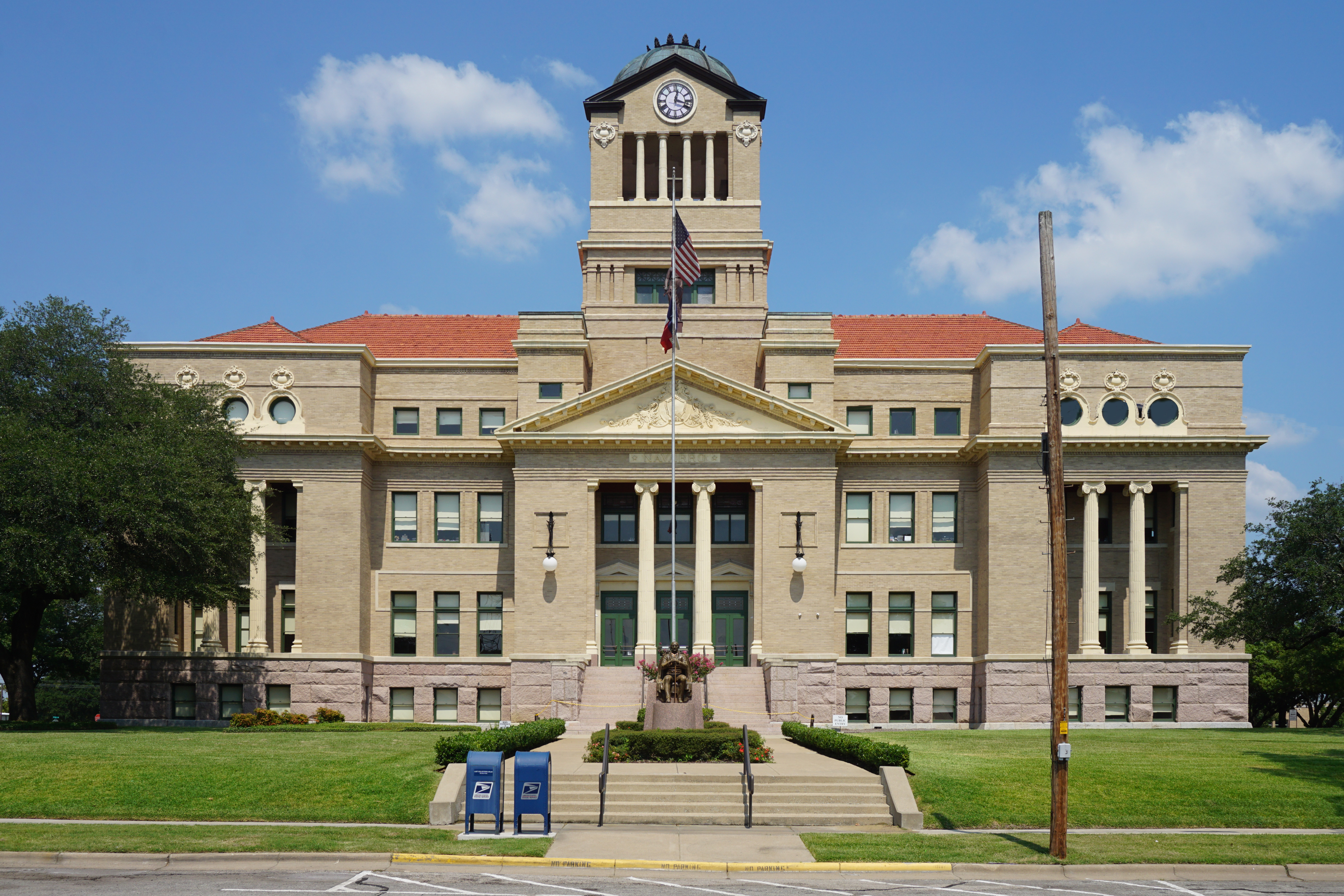
- The Navarro County Courthouse in Corsicana

- Location within the U.S. state of Texas
- Coordinates: 32°03′N 96°28′W
- Country: United States
- State: Texas
- Founded: April 25, 1846
- Named for: José Antonio Navarro
- Seat: Corsicana
- Largest city: Corsicana

Area
  - Total: 1,086 sq mi (2,810 km^{2})
  - Land: 1,010 sq mi (2,600 km^{2})
  - Water: 76 sq mi (200 km^{2}) 7.0%

Population (2020)
  - Total: 52,624
  - Estimate (2025): 57,181 ▲
  - Density: 52.1/sq mi (20.1/km^{2})
- Time zone: UTC−6 (Central)
  - Summer (DST): UTC−5 (CDT)
- Congressional district: 6th
- Website: www.co.navarro.tx.us

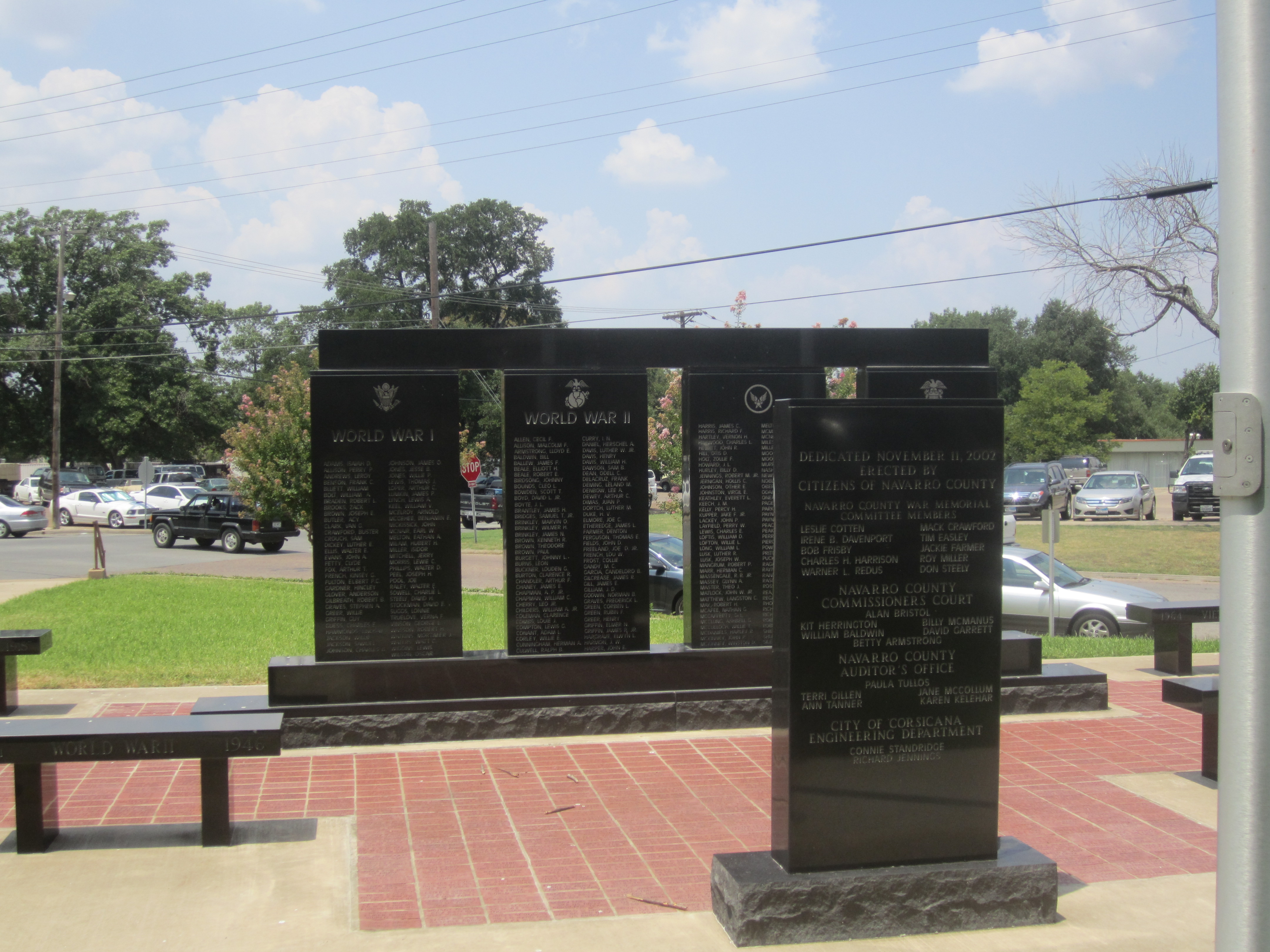
Veterans Memorial at Navarro County Courthouse in Corsicana

Navarro County (/nəˈværoʊ/ nə-VARR-oh) is a county in the U.S. state of Texas. As of the 2020 census, the population was 52,624. Its county seat is Corsicana. The county is named for José Antonio Navarro, a Tejano leader in the Texas Revolution who signed the Texas Declaration of Independence.

Navarro County comprises the Corsicana micropolitan statistical area, which is also part of the Dallas-Fort Worth, TX combined statistical area.

== History ==
Navarro County was formed from Robertson County in 1846.

== Geography ==
According to the U.S. Census Bureau, the county has a total area of 1,086 square miles (2,810 km^{2}), of which 76 square miles (200 km^{2}) (7.0%) are covered by water.

=== Major highways ===
- Interstate 45
  - I-45 BL (Corsicana)
- U.S. Highway 287
- State Highway 14
- State Highway 22
- State Highway 31
- State Highway 75
- State Highway 309
- Spur 263
- Spur 294

=== Adjacent counties ===
- Henderson County (northeast)
- Freestone County (southeast)
- Limestone County (south)
- Hill County (southwest)
- Ellis County (north)

== Demographics ==
Historical population
Census	Pop.	Note	%±
1850	2,190		—
1860	5,996		173.8%
1870	8,879		48.1%
1880	21,702		144.4%
1890	26,373		21.5%
1900	43,374		64.5%
1910	47,070		8.5%
1920	50,624		7.6%
1930	60,507		19.5%
1940	51,308		−15.2%
1950	39,916		−22.2%
1960	34,423		−13.8%
1970	31,150		−9.5%
1980	35,323		13.4%
1990	39,926		13.0%
2000	45,124		13.0%
2010	47,735		5.8%
2020	52,624		10.2%
2025 (est.)	57,181	▲	8.7%
U.S. Decennial Census; 1850–2010 2010 2020

Navarro County, Texas – Racial and ethnic composition Note: the US Census treats Hispanic/Latino as an ethnic category. This table excludes Latinos from the racial categories and assigns them to a separate category. Hispanics/Latinos may be of any race.
Race / Ethnicity (NH = Non-Hispanic)	Pop 1980	Pop 1990	Pop 2000	Pop 2010	Pop 2020	% 1980	% 1990	% 2000	% 2010	% 2020
White alone (NH)	26,585	29,120	29,596	28,587	26,996	75.26%	72.93%	65.59%	59.89%	51.30%
Black or African American alone (NH)	7,079	7,523	7,521	6,490	6,286	20.04%	18.84%	16.67%	13.60%	11.95%
Native American or Alaska Native alone (NH)	63	117	143	155	163	0.18%	0.29%	0.32%	0.32%	0.31%
Asian alone (NH)	62	254	191	239	393	0.18%	0.64%	0.42%	0.50%	0.75%
Native Hawaiian or Pacific Islander alone (NH)	x	x	143	380	734	x	x	0.32%	0.80%	1.39%
Other race alone (NH)	72	21	17	40	137	0.20%	0.05%	0.04%	0.08%	0.26%
Mixed race or Multiracial (NH)	x	x	400	499	1,866	x	x	0.89%	1.05%	3.55%
Hispanic or Latino (any race)	1,462	2,891	7,113	11,345	16,049	4.14%	7.24%	15.76%	23.77%	30.50%
Total	35,323	39,926	45,124	47,735	52,624	100.00%	100.00%	100.00%	100.00%	100.00%

=== 2020 census ===
As of the 2020 census, the county had a population of 52,624. The median age was 38.3 years. 25.4% of residents were under the age of 18 and 17.0% of residents were 65 years of age or older. For every 100 females there were 97.6 males, and for every 100 females age 18 and over there were 95.1 males age 18 and over.

The racial makeup of the county was 57.0% White, 12.2% Black or African American, 0.9% American Indian and Alaska Native, 0.8% Asian, 1.4% Native Hawaiian and Pacific Islander, 14.3% from some other race, and 13.4% from two or more races. Hispanic or Latino residents of any race comprised 30.5% of the population.

46.3% of residents lived in urban areas, while 53.7% lived in rural areas.

There were 18,660 households in the county, of which 35.1% had children under the age of 18 living in them. Of all households, 50.2% were married-couple households, 17.4% were households with a male householder and no spouse or partner present, and 26.4% were households with a female householder and no spouse or partner present. About 24.1% of all households were made up of individuals and 11.3% had someone living alone who was 65 years of age or older.

There were 21,385 housing units, of which 12.7% were vacant. Among occupied housing units, 69.1% were owner-occupied and 30.9% were renter-occupied. The homeowner vacancy rate was 1.3% and the rental vacancy rate was 8.8%.

=== 2000 census ===
As of the 2000 census, 45,124 people, 16,491 households, and 11,906 families were residing in the county. The population density was 45 people per square mile (17 people/km^{2}). The 18,449 housing units averaged 18 units per square mile (6.9/km^{2}). The racial makeup of the county was 70.84% White, 16.79% African American, 0.46% Native American, 0.47% Asian, 0.33% Pacific Islander, 9.45% from other races, and 1.65% from two or more races. Hispanics or Latinos of any race were 15.75% of the population.

Of the 16,491 households, 34.0% had children under 18 living with them, 55.7% were married couples living together, 12.2% had a female householder with no husband present, and 27.8% were not families. About 24.1% of all households were made up of individuals, and 12.0% had someone living alone who was 65 or older. The average household size was 2.65, and the average family size was 3.14.

In the county, the population was distributed as 27.2% under 18, 9.90% from 18 to 24, 26.9% from 25 to 44, 21.5% from 45 to 64, and 14.4% who were 65 or older. The median age was 35 years. For every 100 females, there were 97.0 males. For every 100 females 18 and over, there were 92.7 males.

The median income for a household in the county was $31,268 and for a family was $38,130. Males had a median income of $30,112 versus $20,972 for females. The per capita income for the county was $15,266. About 13.9% of families and 18.2% of the population were below the poverty line, including 23.1% of those under 18 and 14.9% of those 65 or over.

== Media ==
Navarro County is part of the Dallas-Fort Worth coverage area, including stations KDFW-TV, KXAS-TV, WFAA-TV, KTVT-TV, KERA-TV, KTXA-TV, KDFI-TV, KDAF-TV, and KFWD-TV. The county is also near Waco, so Waco/Temple/Killeen stations also provide coverage for Navarro County. These include: KCEN-TV, KWTX-TV, KXXV-TV, KDYW, and KWKT-TV. East Texas NBC affiliate KETK-TV from the Jacksonville/Tyler area provides coverage for Navarro County, as well.

The Corsicana Daily Sun is the area's newspaper.

== Communities ==
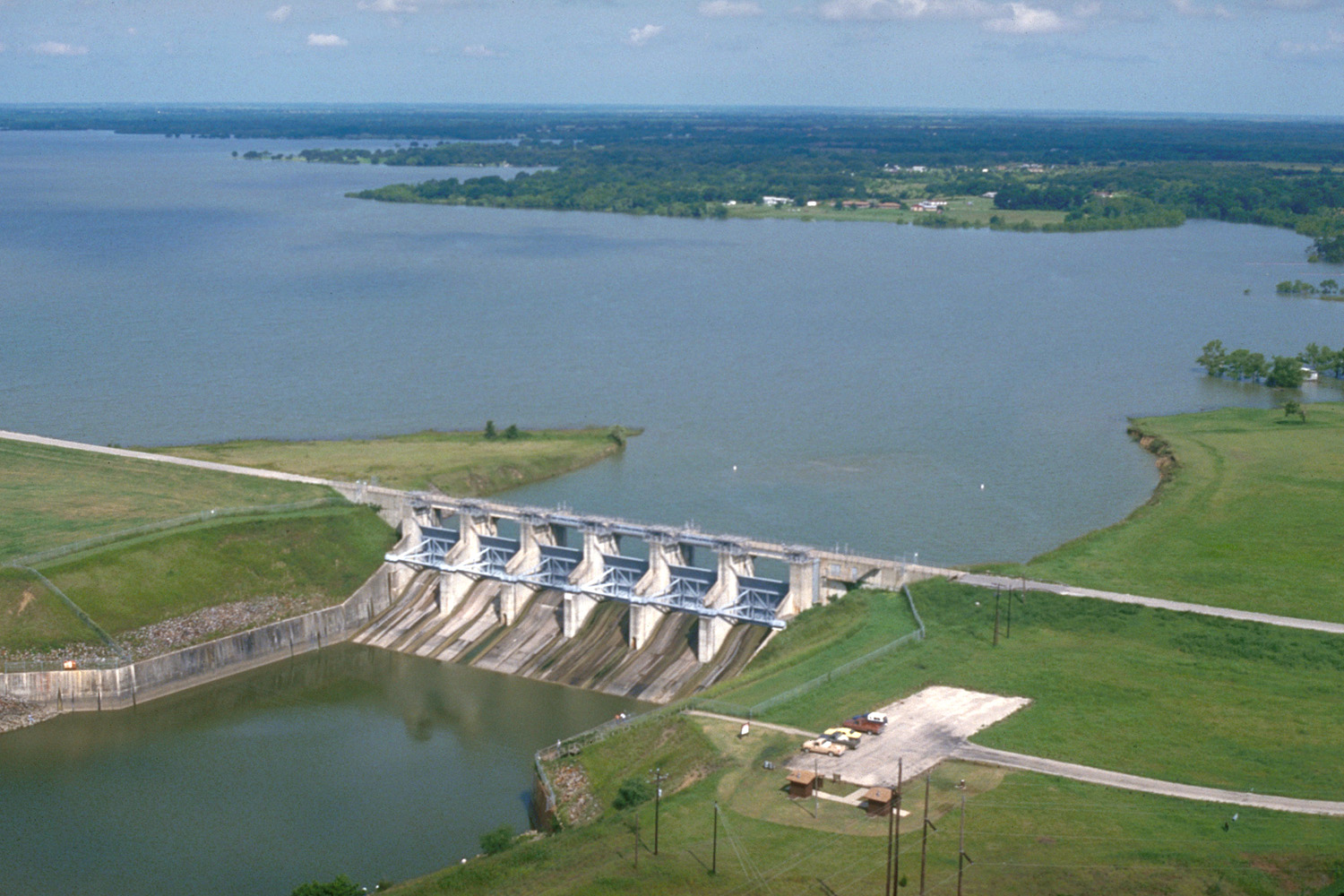
Navarro Mills Lake and Dam

=== Cities ===
- Angus
- Barry
- Corsicana (county seat)
- Eureka
- Frost
- Goodlow
- Kerens
- Rice
- Richland

=== Towns ===
- Blooming Grove
- Dawson
- Emhouse
- Mildred
- Mustang
- Navarro
- Oak Valley
- Powell
- Retreat
- Streetman (mostly in Freestone County)

=== Unincorporated communities ===
- Chatfield
- Emmett
- Montfort
- Purdon
- Pursley
- Roane
- Rural Shade

=== Ghost town ===
- Pisgah

== Politics ==
United States presidential election results for Navarro County, Texas
Year	Republican		Democratic		Third party(ies)	
Year	No.	%	No.	%	No.	%
1912	165	5.41%	2,589	84.94%	294	9.65%
1916	294	7.49%	3,527	89.81%	106	2.70%
1920	821	15.87%	3,328	64.35%	1,023	19.78%
1924	996	13.31%	6,409	85.66%	77	1.03%
1928	3,341	47.80%	3,648	52.20%	0	0.00%
1932	512	7.40%	6,392	92.44%	11	0.16%
1936	293	4.79%	5,815	95.02%	12	0.20%
1940	721	8.57%	7,683	91.30%	11	0.13%
1944	449	6.07%	6,298	85.10%	654	8.84%
1948	1,188	18.29%	4,679	72.05%	627	9.66%
1952	3,592	29.10%	8,745	70.84%	8	0.06%
1956	3,193	40.26%	4,723	59.55%	15	0.19%
1960	3,361	37.76%	5,540	62.24%	0	0.00%
1964	2,139	23.89%	6,811	76.08%	3	0.03%
1968	2,845	27.39%	5,296	50.98%	2,247	21.63%
1972	6,039	64.91%	3,246	34.89%	18	0.19%
1976	4,012	36.25%	6,995	63.20%	61	0.55%
1980	5,400	42.89%	6,988	55.50%	203	1.61%
1984	7,816	57.86%	5,672	41.99%	21	0.16%
1988	6,445	48.71%	6,749	51.01%	38	0.29%
1992	4,897	33.27%	6,006	40.80%	3,818	25.94%
1996	5,236	41.88%	6,078	48.62%	1,188	9.50%
2000	8,358	60.17%	5,366	38.63%	166	1.20%
2004	10,715	66.83%	5,259	32.80%	60	0.37%
2008	10,810	66.23%	5,400	33.09%	111	0.68%
2012	10,847	70.60%	4,350	28.31%	167	1.09%
2016	11,994	72.99%	4,002	24.35%	437	2.66%
2020	13,800	72.06%	5,101	26.64%	250	1.31%
2024	14,983	75.55%	4,708	23.74%	140	0.71%

United States Senate election results for Navarro County, Texas1
Year	Republican		Democratic		Third party(ies)	
Year	No.	%	No.	%	No.	%
2024	14,327	72.37%	5,120	25.86%	351	1.77%

United States Senate election results for Navarro County, Texas2
Year	Republican		Democratic		Third party(ies)	
Year	No.	%	No.	%	No.	%
2020	13,701	72.26%	4,821	25.42%	440	2.32%

Texas Gubernatorial election results for Navarro County
Year	Republican		Democratic		Third party(ies)	
Year	No.	%	No.	%	No.	%
2022	10,830	76.63%	3,157	22.34%	146	1.03%

== Government ==
Navarro County, like all Texas counties, is governed by a Commissioners Court, which consists of the county judge, who is elected county-wide and presides over the full court, and four commissioners, who are elected in each of the county's four precincts

=== County commissioners ===
County Judge	H.M. Davenport, Jr.	Republican
County Commissioner, Precinct 1	Jason Grant	Republican
County Commissioner, Precinct 2	Eddie Perry	Republican
County Commissioner, Precinct 3	Eddie Moore	Republican
County Commissioner, Precinct 4	James Olsen	Republican

=== County officials ===
Office	Name	Party
County Clerk	Sherry Dowd	Republican
Criminal District Attorney	Will Thompson	Republican
District Clerk	Joshua B. Tackett	Republican
Sheriff	Elmer Tanner	Republican
Tax Assessor-Collector	Mike Dowd	Republican

=== Constables ===
Office	Name	Party
Constable, Precinct 1	Mike Davis	Republican
Constable, Precinct 2	Raychaun Ballard	Republican
Constable, Precinct 3	Bobby Rachel	Republican
Constable, Precinct 4	Kipp Thomas	Republican

=== Justices of the Peace ===
Office	Name	Party
Justice, Precinct 1	Greta Jordan	Republican
Justice, Precinct 2	Darrell Waller	Republican
Justice, Precinct 3	Jackie Freeland	Republican
Justice, Precinct 4	Connie Hickman	Republican

=== Community College Board of Trustees ===
Office	Name	Party
Trustee, Precinct 1	Phil Judson	Republican
Trustee, Precinct 2	Faith Holt	Democrat
Trustee, Precinct 3	Loran Seely	Republican
Trustee, Precinct 4	Richard Aldama	Republican
Trustee, At-Large	Billy Todd McGraw	Republican
Trustee, At-Large	A.L. Atkeisson	Republican
Trustee, At-Large	K.C. Wyatt	Republican

== Education ==
School districts include:

- Blooming Grove Independent School District
- Bynum Independent School District
- Corsicana Independent School District
- Dawson Independent School District
- Ennis Independent School District
- Fairfield Independent School District
- Frost Independent School District
- Hubbard Independent School District
- Kerens Independent School District
- Mildred Independent School District
- Rice Independent School District
- Wortham Independent School District

The entire county is in the service area of Navarro College, according to the Texas Education Code.

== See also ==
- National Register of Historic Places listings in Navarro County, Texas
- Recorded Texas Historic Landmarks in Navarro County
