= List of United States tornadoes in April 2024 =

List of tornadoes in the United States

United States tornadoes in April 2024
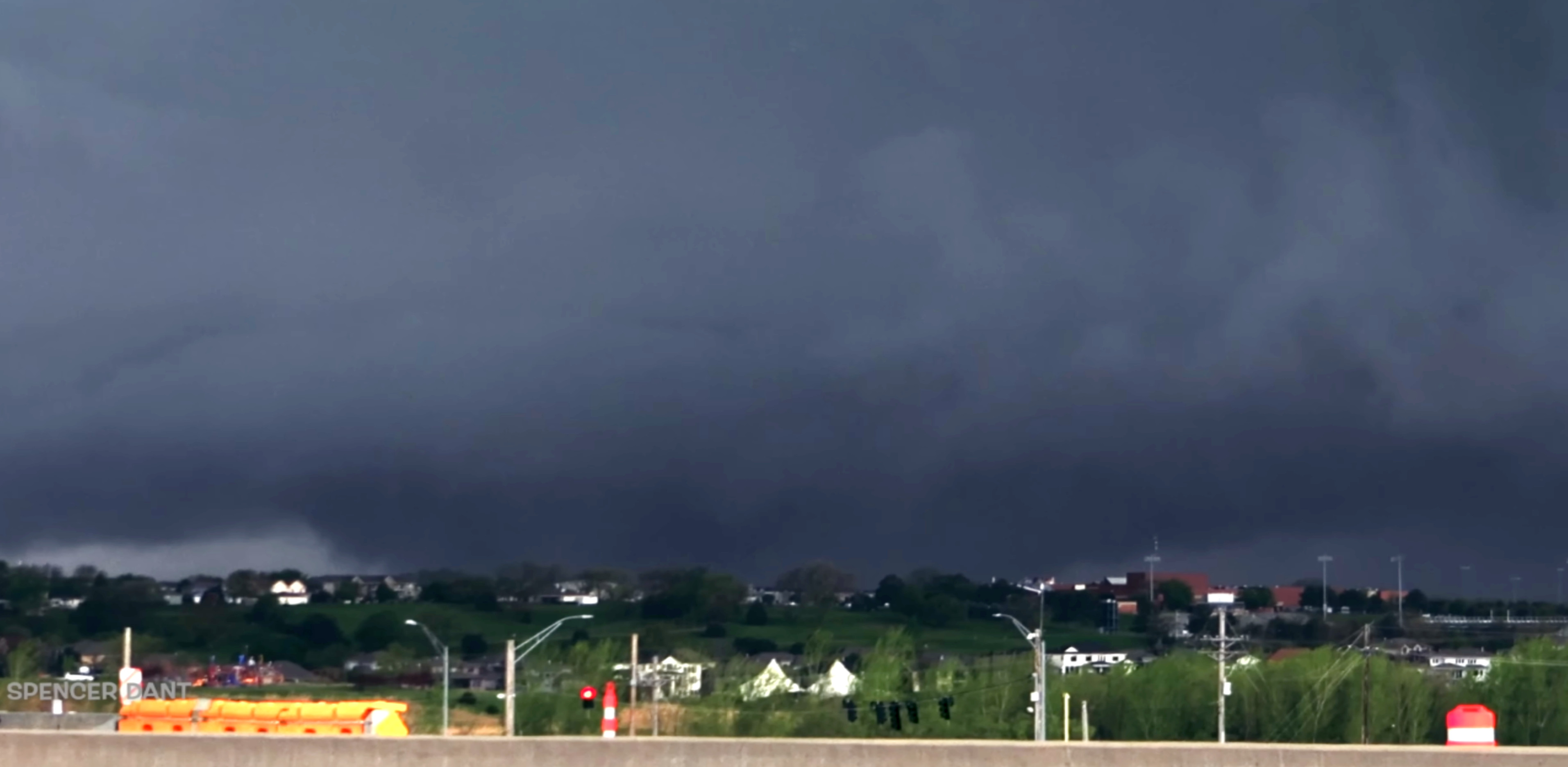
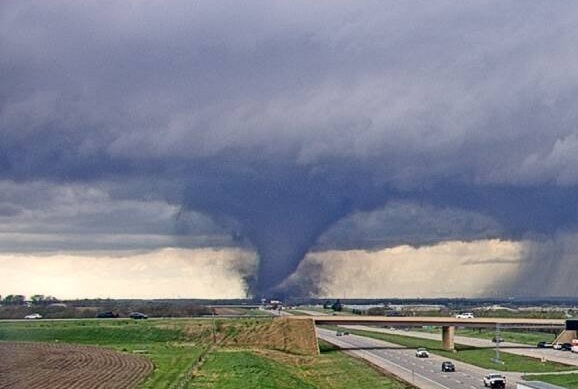
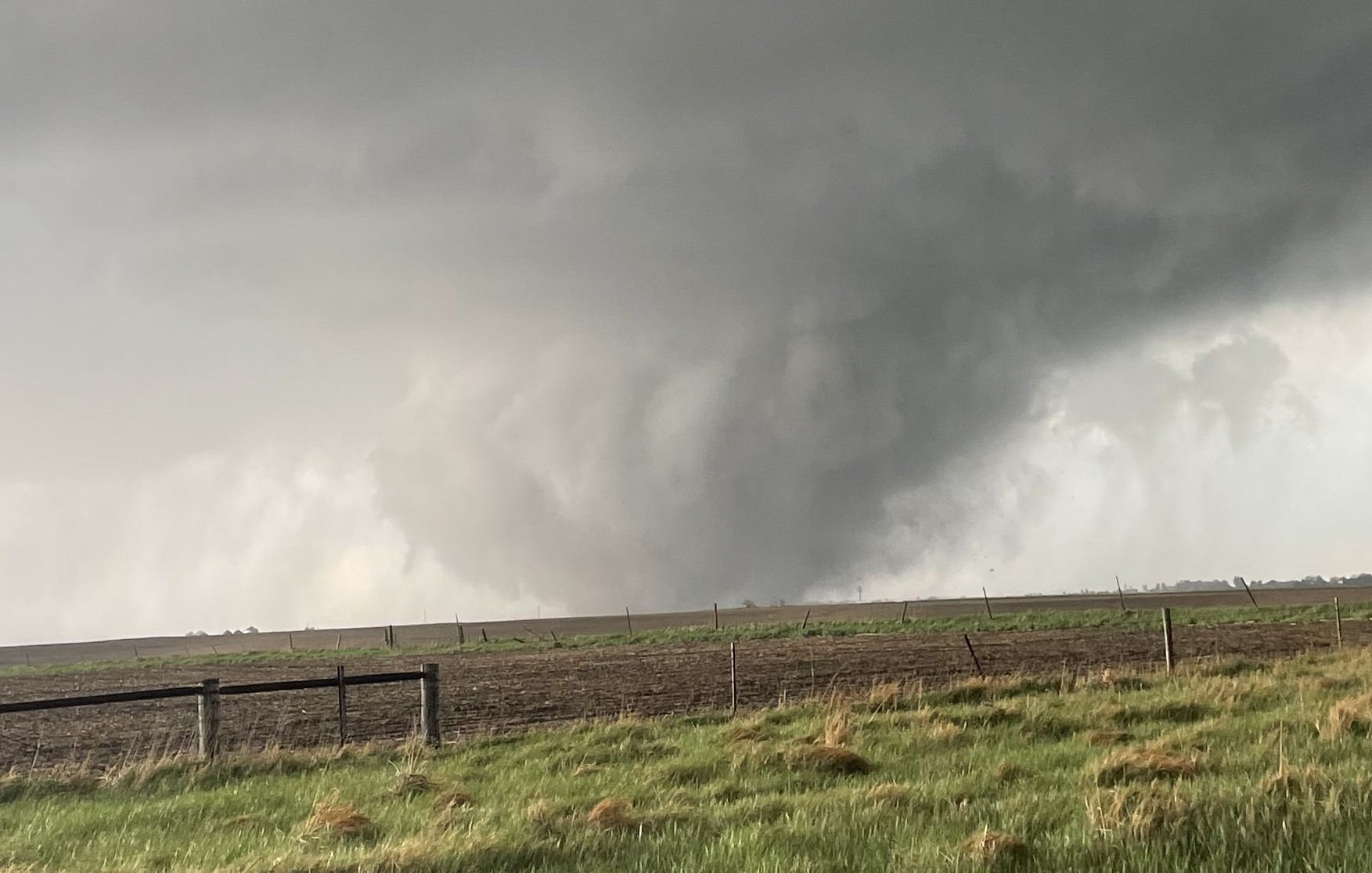
- Clockwise from top: An EF4 tornado near Elkhorn, Nebraska on April 26; A high-end EF3 tornado near Minden, Iowa on April 26; An EF3 tornado near Lincoln, Nebraska on April 26
- Timespan: January 5 – March 26
- Maximum rated tornado: EF4 tornado: Elkhorn, Nebraska on April 26; Marietta, Oklahoma on April 27
- Tornadoes: 357
- Fatalities: 7
- Injuries: >173

This page documents all tornadoes confirmed by various weather forecast offices of the National Weather Service in the United States for April 2024. Tornado counts are considered preliminary until final publication in the database of the National Centers for Environmental Information. Based on the 1991–2020 average, about 155 tornadoes occur in the United States in April. Activity also tends to spread northward and westward in April compared to the cooler winter months and the Midwest and Great Plains tend to see increased activity, although the relative maxima remain in the southern states.

Following the below-average March, tornadic activity increased dramatically in the United States in April. Most of the activity occurred during four large outbreaks that produced 86, 37, 50, and 164 tornadoes, respectively, during the month. The final outbreak of the month was the most destructive, producing several intense tornadoes across the Central Plains, including violent EF4 tornadoes in Nebraska and Oklahoma. April also featured a rare EF0 tornado in Alaska during the middle of the month. As a result, the month was very active with 357 tornadoes, more than double the average for the month and the second most on record in April behind the extraordinarily active April 2011, which had 780 tornadoes.

Several factors led to the record-breaking activity during the month, which was somewhat unusual given that past research has shown that tornado alley has been shifting eastward in recent years due to climate change increasing temperatures across the Great Plains, which led to stronger capping inversions. However, at the beginning of April, an ongoing El Niño caused temperatures across the Plains and Midwestern United States to be cooler than normal. Meanwhile, record-breaking heat waves in Texas and Mexico led to a large temperature contrast between the two areas. This began to change in April, however, when the El Niño began to weaken. This coupled with a much warmer than normal Gulf of Mexico allowed the hot, moist air to impinge upon the cool, dry air. This led to the jet stream being stronger the normal and allowed for much stronger wind shear environments to be in place. Instability was also higher due to this contrast of air masses. This especially became apparent at the end of April when the environmental setup triggered a very large and devastating outbreak across the Central Plains and the Midwest. Tornadic activity would only increase after April and eventually went into overdrive throughout the month of May.

== April ==
Confirmed tornadoes by Enhanced Fujita rating
EFU	EF0	EF1	EF2	EF3	EF4	EF5	Total
46	93	171	37	8	2	0	357

=== April 1 event ===
List of confirmed tornadoes – Monday, April 1, 2024 (Note: All dates are based on the local time zone where the tornado touched down; however, all times are in Coordinated Universal Time for consistency.)
EF#	Location	County / parish	State	Start Coord.	Time (UTC)	Path length	Max width
EF0	Chesterfield	St. Louis	MO	38.653°N 90.551°W	23:32–23:35	2.01 mi (3.23 km)	332 yd (304 m)
EF0	A high-end EF0 tornado caused minor roof and siding damage to homes, blew down part of a fence, and damaged trees, including some that were snapped or uprooted.						
EF1	N of Hominy to SE of Wynona	Osage	OK	36.4763°N 96.4089°W	00:17–00:27	7 mi (11 km)	600 yd (550 m)
EF1	This high-end EF1 tornado snapped or uprooted numerous trees and blew down numerous power poles.						
EF1	ESE of Wynona to W of Barnsdall	Osage	OK	36.5385°N 96.2887°W	00:28–00:36	5.5 mi (8.9 km)	1,000 yd (910 m)
EF1	A large, high-end EF1 tornado formed almost immediately after the previous tornado dissipated. It blew the roof off of a garage, uprooted or snapped trees, and blew down numerous power poles.						
EF1	Southeastern Barnsdall	Osage	OK	36.5583°N 96.1613°W	00:38–00:41	2.2 mi (3.5 km)	550 yd (500 m)
EF1	Homes were damaged, outbuildings were destroyed, and trees and power poles were blown down. An even stronger tornado would strike this area a month later.						
EF1	N of Ochelata	Osage, Washington	OK	36.6335°N 96.0079°W	00:49–00:56	4.9 mi (7.9 km)	550 yd (500 m)
EF1	A tornado damaged outbuildings, uprooted trees, and blew down power poles.						
EF1	N of Delaware	Nowata	OK	36.7883°N 95.6713°W	01:13–01:19	4.2 mi (6.8 km)	600 yd (550 m)
EF1	Trees were uprooted, large tree limbs were snapped, outbuildings were damaged, and power poles were blown down.						
EF1	WNW of Fair Grove	Greene	MO	37.4°N 93.26°W	03:37–03:44	2.08 mi (3.35 km)	100 yd (91 m)
EF1	Several trees were uprooted or snapped, an outbuilding was heavily damaged, and a residence suffered minor damage.						
EF0	NE of Long Lane	Dallas, Laclede	MO	37.63°N 92.87°W	04:06–04:14	2.03 mi (3.27 km)	200 yd (180 m)
EF0	A tornado uprooted and/or snapped over 200 trees, rolled an unanchored mobile home, damaged the roof of a residence, and damaged multiple outbuildings.						
EF0	Morgan	Laclede	MO	37.51°N 92.68°W	04:20–04:27	2.16 mi (3.48 km)	100 yd (91 m)
EF0	An intermittent tornado damaged outbuildings and trees, including some trees that were snapped or uprooted.						
EF0	NNE of Evergreen	Laclede	MO	37.58°N 92.59°W	04:24–04:30	2.3 mi (3.7 km)	100 yd (91 m)
EF0	Some outbuildings and trees were damaged by an intermittent tornado.						

=== April 2 event ===
List of confirmed tornadoes – Tuesday, April 2, 2024
EF#	Location	County / parish	State	Start Coord.	Time (UTC)	Path length	Max width
EF0	St. James	Phelps	MO	37.9955°N 91.6116°W	05:27–05:31	0.26 mi (0.42 km)	10 yd (9.1 m)
EF0	A brief, weak tornado damaged small outbuildings at an elementary school as well as a light pole at a football stadium. A school camera captured the tornado moving over a school building.						
EF1	NW of Garfield	Benton	AR	36.4561°N 94.0265°W	05:33–05:37	2.8 mi (4.5 km)	550 yd (500 m)
EF1	Numerous trees were uprooted.						
EF1	Garfield	Benton	AR	36.449°N 94.0057°W	05:35–05:38	2.4 mi (3.9 km)	300 yd (270 m)
EF1	A twin tornado developed to the south of the previous tornado. The roofs of two homes were damaged, an outbuilding was destroyed, and trees were uprooted.						
EF0	NE of Gordonville	Cape Girardeau	MO	37.3283°N 89.6342°W	09:15–09:16	0.44 mi (0.71 km)	150 yd (140 m)
EF0	A brief tornado downed several large tree limbs. Sporadic damaging winds continued eastward after the tornado dissipated.						
EF2	NNW of Goreville to W of Creal Springs	Williamson	IL	37.6341°N 89.0017°W	09:46–09:52	6.66 mi (10.72 km)	250 yd (230 m)
EF2	This tornado began along IL 148 and crossed over I-57 heading east, causing roof damage to homes and outbuildings and snapping or uprooting trees. The tornado reached its peak intensity of high-end EF2 along the north side of the Lake of Egypt, causing severe roof and structural damage to three businesses and blowing out a window at the nearby fire protection building. The tornado continued to damage homes and outbuildings and snapped or uprooted numerous trees before dissipating.						
EF1	ENE Creal Springs to E of Stonefort	Williamson, Saline	IL	37.6229°N 88.8215°W	09:56–10:03	7.57 mi (12.18 km)	250 yd (230 m)
EF1	Along the beginning of this tornado path, many trees were snapped or uprooted. Moving eastward, the tornado reached its peak intensity of high-end EF1 as it moved directly through Stonefort. A couple of homes had portions of their roofs ripped off; however, the majority of houses were damaged by fallen trees. Outbuildings and a mobile home also had roof damage in the town. The tornado continued to snap and uproot trees east of the town before dissipating.						
EF1	ENE of Kevil	McCracken	KY	37.0941°N 88.8666°W	10:05–10:06	0.6 mi (0.97 km)	50 yd (46 m)
EF1	A house had a portion of its roof removed, a couple of other homes suffered fascia and siding damage, and about a dozen trees had large limbs downed.						
EF2	ESE of Eldorado	Saline	IL	37.7913°N 88.4029°W	10:15–10:16	1.14 mi (1.83 km)	100 yd (91 m)
EF2	A strong tornado destroyed an outbuilding and removed portions of roofing from two homes. An industrial garage and two manufactured homes were severely damaged. One manufactured home was moved several feet off its foundation and had one of its walls torn open, resulting in injury to two occupants. Multiple trees were snapped or uprooted.						
EF1	Ridgway	Gallatin	IL	37.7953°N 88.2712°W	10:21–10:22	0.98 mi (1.58 km)	100 yd (91 m)
EF1	A brief tornado caused roof damage to a house and an outbuilding. A grain bin was also damaged and several trees were downed.						
EF1	S of New Haven, IL	Gallatin (IL), Posey (IN)	IL, IN	37.8893°N 88.2139°W	10:22–10:29	7.45 mi (11.99 km)	100 yd (91 m)
EF1	Several large trees were snapped or uprooted, one of which crushed a small brick building. A manufactured home was severely damaged and a nearby outbuilding had part of its roof ripped off.						
EF1	E of Ridgway	Gallatin	IL	37.7915°N 88.1777°W	10:26–10:28	1.96 mi (3.15 km)	75 yd (69 m)
EF1	A brief tornado caused significant roof damage to a couple of large farm outbuildings and debris was tossed hundreds of feet. A home sustained shingle damage and several trees were snapped or uprooted.						
EF2	NNE of Maunie, IL to S of Wadesville, IN	White (IL), Posey (IN)	IL, IN	38.0646°N 88.0206°W	10:31–10:43	14.9 mi (24.0 km)	250 yd (230 m)
EF2	This EF2 tornado snapped or uprooted hundreds of trees. Several outbuildings and sheds were damaged or destroyed. Several homes sustained minor to moderate roof damage. This tornado eventually merged with the 10:37 UTC tornado.						
EF2	S of Uniontown	Union	KY	37.7631°N 88.0314°W	10:34–10:40	6.84 mi (11.01 km)	150 yd (140 m)
EF2	Several homes sustained significant roof damage and/or were shifted off their foundations. Dozens of trees were snapped or uprooted.						
EF2	SSE of New Harmony to WSW of Darmstadt	Posey	IN	38.0941°N 87.9229°W	10:37–10:48	11.56 mi (18.60 km)	250 yd (230 m)
EF2	A strong tornado snapped or uprooted hundreds of trees and damaged or destroyed dozens of outbuildings. Several homes sustained minor to moderate damage. This tornado merged with the 10:31 UTC tornado.						
EF1	NE of Morganfield	Union	KY	37.7209°N 87.8936°W	10:41–10:42	1.24 mi (2.00 km)	50 yd (46 m)
EF1	A large, newly built farm outbuilding sustained severe roof and wall damage. A home sustained shingle and fascia damage, a shed was destroyed, and a carport was damaged. Several trees were damaged as well.						
EF1	SE of Sturgis	Union	KY	37.4936°N 87.9488°W	10:46–10:47	0.72 mi (1.16 km)	100 yd (91 m)
EF1	A large farm outbuilding was severely damaged, two homes sustained roof damage, and several large trees were snapped at their base. One tree fell on a manufactured home, resulting in injury to a resident.						
EF2	E of Wadesville to Darmstadt to SSW of Elberfeld	Posey, Vanderburgh, Warrick	IN	38.1113°N 87.7214°W	10:47–11:00	14.9 mi (24.0 km)	250 yd (230 m)
EF2	A strong tornado completely ripped the roofs off several homes. Additional but more minor damage occurred to a few other homes as well. Numerous outbuildings or sheds were damaged or destroyed. Hundreds of trees were snapped or uprooted.						
EF2	WNW of Nisbet to NNW of Millersburg	Vanderburgh, Warrick	IN	38.1501°N 87.6823°W	10:47–11:03	14.92 mi (24.01 km)	250 yd (230 m)
EF2	A significant tornado damaged or destroyed dozens of outbuildings, damaged several homes, and snapped electrical power poles. Hundreds of trees were also snapped or uprooted.						
EF1	S of Haubstadt to SE of Elberfeld	Vanderburgh, Warrick	IN	38.1668°N 87.573°W	10:54–11:03	9.55 mi (15.37 km)	200 yd (180 m)
EF1	Dozens of trees were snapped or uprooted and several outbuildings were damaged or destroyed. A few homes sustained minor to moderate damage. This tornado merged with the 10:48 UTC EF2 tornado.						
EF1	S of Elberfeld	Vanderburgh, Warrick	IN	38.157°N 87.5046°W	10:57–11:01	3.05 mi (4.91 km)	150 yd (140 m)
EF1	A home sustained minor roof damage, several outbuildings were damaged or destroyed, and dozens of trees were snapped or uprooted.						
EF1	SSE of Chandler	Warrick	IN	38.0199°N 87.3629°W	11:04–11:06	1.64 mi (2.64 km)	100 yd (91 m)
EF1	Three homes suffered substantial roof damage and hundreds of trees were either snapped or uprooted.						
EF1	SSE of Stanley to SW of Folsomville	Warrick	IN	38.1413°N 87.3349°W	11:05–11:13	8.45 mi (13.60 km)	200 yd (180 m)
EF1	A large barn was destroyed and one home sustained significant shingle damage. A few other houses sustained minor damage as well. Dozens of trees were snapped or uprooted.						
EF1	E of Chaplin	Nelson, Washington	KY	37.9341°N 85.2201°W	12:50–12:56	5.02 mi (8.08 km)	125 yd (114 m)
EF1	Over a dozen barns and outbuildings were heavily damaged or destroyed and extensive tree damage occurred.						
EF1	SW of Lawrenceburg	Anderson	KY	37.9558°N 85.0453°W	12:56–12:59	2.1 mi (3.4 km)	150 yd (140 m)
EF1	A home had extensive roof damage while two nearby barns had large portions of their roofs removed. Another home had minor roof and exterior damage and trees were snapped or twisted.						
EF1	NW of Nicholasville	Woodford, Jessamine	KY	37.981°N 84.6843°W	13:11–13:15	1.78 mi (2.86 km)	300 yd (270 m)
EF1	Multiple barns were significantly damaged or destroyed. A garage door was blown in, a home sustained broken windows, and multiple trees were downed.						
EF1	NNE of Nicholasville	Jessamine	KY	37.9372°N 84.5483°W	13:18–13:19	0.42 mi (0.68 km)	150 yd (140 m)
EF1	A very brief tornado tossed two storage sheds onto a highway. It continued into an industrial park, ripping off large portions of roofing, blowing out doors, and pulling away wall panels from many buildings and warehouses. Boards and drywall were impaled into the surrounding structures and the ground. Three vehicles were flipped over and a heavy travel trailer was moved about 20 yd (18 m).						
EF1	SSE of Monterey to N of Mount Zion	Bourbon, Clark	KY	38.1471°N 84.3042°W	13:20–13:35	12.68 mi (20.41 km)	100 yd (91 m)
EF1	Three funnels consolidated into a tornado that impacted two farms. On one farm, multiple structures sustained damage. On the other property, an open-area structure was collapsed save for one remaining wall. An adjacent stable sustained roof damage and multiple trailers were flipped. Six horses were injured, a barn was demolished, and multiple large trees were downed, which likely caused damage to a stone cabin.						
EF1	WSW of Becknerville	Clark	KY	37.9754°N 84.3056°W	13:30–13:33	1.94 mi (3.12 km)	150 yd (140 m)
EF1	One home had a portion of its roof torn off while others were damaged and trees were snapped.						
EF0	S of Sharpsburg	Bath	KY	38.1756°N 83.9826°W	13:37–13:38	0.36 mi (0.58 km)	75 yd (69 m)
EF0	A home sustained extensive roof damage and some structural damage. The southeast corner of a barn was blown out. Extensive tree damage occurred as well.						
EF0	ENE of Sharpsburg	Bath	KY	38.215°N 83.8319°W	13:39	0.1 mi (0.16 km)	25 yd (23 m)
EF0	The back half of the roofing structure of a manufactured home was lifted. Grass, mud, and insulation plastered the front of the home. This is the only damage caused by this very brief tornado.						
EF1	Greenup to Northern Ironton	Greenup (KY), Lawrence (OH)	KY, OH	38.5713°N 82.839°W	14:12–14:20	7.88 mi (12.68 km)	250 yd (230 m)
EF1	A high-end EF1 tornado began in Greenup beginning at a cemetery in town. The tornado tracked southeast, damaging the roofs of building and downing trees, some onto buildings. The tornado crossed the Ohio River into the town of Hanging Rock, where it impacted a campground. Several RV were overturned and tossed throughout the campgrounds. A salt storage dome was destroyed, causing one employee to get seriously injured. The tornado continued southeastward, damaging a few homes and the Ironton Middle School before weakening and dissipating. This was originally classified as a microburst before reanalysis determined it was a tornado.						
EF1	N of Ironville	Boyd	KY	38.4562°N 82.7122°W	14:21–14:23	1.1 mi (1.8 km)	250 yd (230 m)
EF1	A single-wide trailer home was flipped, and a home was damaged and shifted off its foundation with other homes also receiving damage. This tornado was embedded within a larger area of damaging straight-line winds from the storm.						
EF2	SW of Garner	Boyd	KY	38.2828°N 82.7613°W	14:24–14:26	1.14 mi (1.83 km)	450 yd (410 m)
EF2	This brief but strong tornado caused severe tree damage, destroyed several barns and outbuildings, and removed the roof from a house completely. Additional homes sustained damage.						
EF1	NW of Willow Wood	Lawrence	OH	38.5989°N 82.5055°W	14:26–14:27	1.09 mi (1.75 km)	200 yd (180 m)
EF1	The roofs were blown off three structures, including two homes. Tin panels were uplifted on a barn roof as well. A few trees were knocked down. A travel trailer was rolled.						
EF1	SSW of Huntington	Wayne, Cabell	WV	38.3796°N 82.4614°W	14:34	0.56 mi (0.90 km)	200 yd (180 m)
EF1	Trees were snapped or uprooted by this high-end EF1 tornado. Buildings suffered minor damage as well.						
EF1	NW of Crown City	Lawrence	OH	38.6487°N 82.3778°W	14:34–14:35	0.44 mi (0.71 km)	250 yd (230 m)
EF1	A high-end EF1 tornado snapped or uprooted a significant amount of trees in the Wayne National Forest.						
EF1	NW of Wilson to northern Barboursville	Cabell	WV	38.4346°N 82.3479°W	14:39–14:42	4.2 mi (6.8 km)	200 yd (180 m)
EF1	An intermittent, high-end EF1 tornado touched down next to the Ohio River in West Virginia, tracking southeast and damaging numerous trees.						
EF1	NE of Crown City	Gallia	OH	38.6166°N 82.2417°W	14:40–14:41	0.5 mi (0.80 km)	150 yd (140 m)
EF1	Several large hardwood trees were uprooted in a ravine. Some barns were damaged by fallen trees. The roof and exterior walls of a warehouse were blown off.						
EF1	S of Fraziers Bottom to Bancroft	Putnam	WV	38.5109°N 81.9956°W	14:54–14:59	8.5 mi (13.7 km)	200 yd (180 m)
EF1	An intermittent, low-end EF1 tornado caused scattered tree damage, mainly downing large tree limbs with a few uprooted trees at first. Moving east, a narrow swath of uprooted and snapped trees resulted in the EF1 rating. The tornado continued east, crossing the Kanawha River before dissipating in Bancroft.						
EF0	Southern Buffalo	Putnam	WV	38.6055°N 81.9804°W	14:55–14:56	0.55 mi (0.89 km)	100 yd (91 m)
EF0	A high-end EF0 tornado uprooted and snapped several large trees.						
EF1	SE of St. Albans to Northern Dunbar	Kanawha	WV	38.3697°N 81.8157°W	15:02–15:06	5 mi (8.0 km)	300 yd (270 m)
EF1	An EF1 tornado snapped or uprooted a significant number of trees, many of which fell on and damaged homes. Another house had its roof blown off.						
EF2	Cross Lanes to S of Wallace	Kanawha	WV	38.4329°N 81.8109°W	15:04–15:10	8 mi (13 km)	300 yd (270 m)
EF2	This intermittent but strong low-end EF2 tornado traveled near the Putnam-Kanawha County line. Several large and healthy trees were snapped at their bases and uprooted. Minor damage to homes was noted in the area, too. The tornado traveled due east, continuing to snap and uproot trees. One of the trees fell onto a home, which significantly damaged the second story of the home. Before lifting, several additional large trees were either snapped and/or uprooted.						
EF1	W of Hernshaw to Southern Marmet	Kanawha	WV	38.2353°N 81.6569°W	15:11–15:15	5.14 mi (8.27 km)	200 yd (180 m)
EF1	A tornado began in the Kanawha State Forest and skipped along an intermittent path eastward. The top floor was blown off of one structure, an RV was rolled, and significant tree damage occurred. The tornado dissipated before reaching I-64.						
EF1	Quick to NE of Coalridge	Kanawha	WV	38.3735°N 81.4227°W	15:15–15:17	2.25 mi (3.62 km)	200 yd (180 m)
EF1	Two mobile homes were destroyed, a utility pole was snapped at its base, and significant tree damage occurred.						
EF1	Dry Branch	Kanawha	WV	38.1717°N 81.4610°W	15:21–15:22	0.78 mi (1.26 km)	100 yd (91 m)
EF1	A tornado snapped and uprooted trees and damaged the roofs of a few homes.						
EF1	SW of Georgetown	Harrison, Floyd	IN	38.2699°N 86.0216°W	17:09–17:15	3.2 mi (5.1 km)	30 yd (27 m)
EF1	A tornado touched down multiple times, primarily inflicting damage to trees. One home had a portion of its roof decking ripped off and thrown. Roofing material and outdoor accessories were blown away as well. Another home also sustained damage to its gutter covers.						
EF0	S of Goodrich to WNW of Limestone	Kankakee	IL	41.0841°N 88.0599°W	19:02–19:08	4.6 mi (7.4 km)	50 yd (46 m)
EF0	A grain silo was tossed into a field. Trees and barns were also damaged.						
EFU	NNE of Irwin	Kankakee	IL	41.0927°N 87.9677°W	19:10–19:11	0.65 mi (1.05 km)	10 yd (9.1 m)
EFU	A narrow rope tornado was photographed by several people. No known damage occurred.						
EF0	W of Whitaker	Kankakee	IL	41.2493°N 87.7613°W	19:30–19:31	0.52 mi (0.84 km)	25 yd (23 m)
EF0	This short-lived tornado caused damage to power poles as well as a small metal structure that was destroyed.						
EF2	S of Hico	Fayette	WV	38.0845°N 81.004°W	20:31–20:36	5.31 mi (8.55 km)	325 yd (297 m)
EF2	A strong tornado touched down and immediately started causing considerable and significant tree damage, snapping and uprooting hundreds of trees. Several homes were damaged by trees, including one home that had significant roof damage. The tornado made a slight jog to the northeast where the tornado reached its peak intensity with significant tree damage. The tornado damaged or destroyed several homes, shifting one home several feet off its foundation and tossing the metal roof approximately 350 yd (320 m).						
EF1	Sunbright	Morgan	TN	36.242°N 84.6725°W	21:20–21:25	2.86 mi (4.60 km)	150 yd (140 m)
EF1	A tornado touched down in downtown Sunbright and dealt damage to numerous residential and commercial structures. As the tornado tracked northeast, exiting the town, some metal building structures, barns, and trees in this area were damaged. The tornado re-intensified and damaged several more homes and barns before it dissipated. This tornado occurred almost exactly one year after a tornado struck Sunbright during an outbreak the previous year.						
EF2	Watson, IN to Prospect, KY to WNW of Brownsboro, KY	Clark (IN), Jefferson (KY), Oldham (KY)	IN, KY	38.348°N 85.7207°W	21:31–21:45	11.15 mi (17.94 km)	450 yd (410 m)
EF2	See section on this tornado – There were 22 injuries.						
EF2	Buckner	Oldham	KY	38.3862°N 85.4978°W	21:46–21:53	5.33 mi (8.58 km)	300 yd (270 m)
EF2	An EF2 tornado impacted multiple homes, ripping off large portions of roofing, blowing out windows, and inverting or blowing out garage doors. The roof HVAC system at a high school was blown to the ground, and a nearby streetlight was bent. An adjacent metal warehouse sustained some roof damage and had its garage doors inverted. A large, open-faced metal RV storage building likewise sustained damage to its roof and walls. Numerous trees were snapped or uprooted as well.						
EF1	SW of Bear Branch	Ohio	IN	38.9034°N 85.1399°W	21:52–21:57	3.34 mi (5.38 km)	100 yd (91 m)
EF1	A tornado touched down in the southwesternmost corner of Ohio County before destroying a garage and a well-constructed barn. The tornado continued east through inaccessible areas, uprooting trees before lifting.						
EF0	N of Richmond	Wayne	IN	39.8503°N 84.869°W	21:53–21:58	3.42 mi (5.50 km)	200 yd (180 m)
EF0	A weak tornado developed north of Richmond where trees were broken off and uprooted at the start of the damage path. From there, the tornado traveled northeast across I-70 causing mainly tree damage along its path. After the tornado crossed the interstate, it widened briefly, damaging several barns, outbuildings, and residential structures. Several of the barns lost major portions of their roofs, trailers were tipped over, and a porch was damaged on a home. The tornado then continued over open fields before dissipating as it approached the Ohio-Indiana state line.						
EF1	NW of Jericho to ESE of New Castle	Henry	KY	38.4081°N 85.2901°W	21:58–22:09	7.78 mi (12.52 km)	200 yd (180 m)
EF1	This high-end EF1 tornado destroyed a poorly anchored double-wide mobile home, and damaged homes, businesses, outbuildings, and trees.						
EF1	NW of Leighton	Colbert	AL	34.6922°N 87.5683°W	21:55–22:06	6.96 mi (11.20 km)	750 yd (690 m)
EF1	Numerous trees were damaged and a boat resting on a trailer was flipped and thrown 20 yd (18 m).						
EF0	S of Brooksville	Bracken	KY	38.6672°N 84.0904°W	23:15–23:19	3.2 mi (5.1 km)	250 yd (230 m)
EF0	Several barns, outbuildings, and trees were damaged.						
EF1	Minerva to SW of Ripley	Mason	KY	38.704°N 83.9216°W	23:27–23:31	3.5 mi (5.6 km)	300 yd (270 m)
EF1	Numerous trees were uprooted and snapped and a structure suffered considerable roof loss and partial collapse of a second story brick wall.						
EF1	NNW of Manchester to NNE of West Union	Adams	OH	38.7662°N 83.647°W	23:46–23:57	7.87 mi (12.67 km)	500 yd (460 m)
EF1	A tornado touched down and immediately destroyed a poorly anchored mobile home. Tree and outbuilding damage also occurred in the area before the tornado tracked northeast. The tornado removed the roof of a covered bridge. Several well-constructed outbuildings were damaged and multiple large trees were snapped nearby as the tornado reached its peak intensity. More trees were snapped and uprooted as the tornado continued northeast. The tornado then briefly entered Adams Lake State Park, where considerable tree damage occurred before the tornado lifted.						
EF0	NE of Athens	Limestone	AL	34.8261°N 86.8947°W	23:01–23:04	1.11 mi (1.79 km)	123 yd (112 m)
EF0	Multiple small and large tree branches were snapped, a garage and a shed lost a significant amount of their metal roofing, and several large trees were uprooted.						
EF0	E of Linnville to N of Gratiot	Licking	OH	39.9691°N 82.3146°W	00:08–00:15	5.29 mi (8.51 km)	150 yd (140 m)
EF0	A tornado developed and moved northeast causing mainly tree and minor structural damage along its path.						
EF1	N of Zanesville to SSE of Adamsville	Muskingum	OH	40.0085°N 82.0162°W	00:32–00:44	8.16 mi (13.13 km)	75 yd (69 m)
EF1	The tornado began at the Parr Airport, where it collapsed a hangar and shifted tied-down aircraft. The roof was lifted off a single-wide manufactured home; two barns and a frame home sustained roof damage as well. A small shed was destroyed. Numerous trees were snapped or uprooted.						
EF2	SSW of Leo	Jackson	OH	39.0917°N 82.7198°W	00:47–00:50	1.87 mi (3.01 km)	325 yd (297 m)
EF2	A brief but strong tornado leveled an extensive portion of a thick forest. One home was damaged by a fallen tree.						
EF0	WSW of Bloomfield	Muskingum	OH	40.0345°N 81.8167°W	00:49–00:51	1.21 mi (1.95 km)	50 yd (46 m)
EF0	A weak tornado snapped a few trees and caused roof damage to a few outbuildings.						
EF1	NE of Bloomfield	Guernsey	OH	40.0741°N 81.7179°W	00:57–00:58	1.29 mi (2.08 km)	75 yd (69 m)
EF1	Numerous trees were snapped or uprooted. A barn sustained minor structural damage and a manufactured home sustained partial roof damage.						
EF1	SW of Chandlersville	Muskingum	OH	39.8847°N 81.8478°W	01:20–01:21	0.54 mi (0.87 km)	150 yd (140 m)
EF1	Numerous trees were snapped or uprooted and a barn lost some of its metal roofing panels.						
EF1	W of Plantersville	Dallas, Chilton	AL	32.641°N 87.0398°W	03:28–03:37	8.28 mi (13.33 km)	600 yd (550 m)
EF1	Hundreds of trees were uprooted or snapped by this tornado, some of which blocked roads and fell near homes.						
EF1	NE of Pletcher to SE of Clanton	Chilton	AL	32.7121°N 86.7786°W	03:49–04:06	15.07 mi (24.25 km)	450 yd (410 m)
EF1	Numerous trees sustained damage and multiple homes and outbuildings were damaged. A car trailer was blown 100 yd (91 m) and destroyed, as well as a barn. An additional home sustained roof damage before the tornado dissipated.						
EF2	Northern Conyers	Rockdale	GA	33.6554°N 84.0903°W	03:49–04:06	9.47 mi (15.24 km)	800 yd (730 m)
EF2	To the west of Conyers, this tornado snapped or uprooted numerous trees and damaged homes in multiple neighborhoods. A small area of low-end EF2 damage occurred in an area where a home had a large portion of its roof removed and a nearby power pole was snapped. After crossing I-20/US 278, the tornado moved through the northern part of Conyers, causing weaker but still significant damage to homes, vehicles, and businesses. The tornado then dissipated northeast of the town along SR 138. Two people were injured.						
EF1	N of Rockford	Coosa	AL	32.9182°N 86.245°W	04:28–04:31	2.65 mi (4.26 km)	400 yd (370 m)
EF1	A brief tornado caused minor damage to trees and vegetation.						
EF0	Kellyton	Coosa	AL	32.9712°N 86.0793°W	04:40–04:44	2.28 mi (3.67 km)	175 yd (160 m)
EF0	Minor tree damage occurred.						

=== April 3 event ===
List of confirmed tornadoes –Wednesday, April 3, 2024
EF#	Location	County / parish	State	Start Coord.	Time (UTC)	Path length	Max width
EF0	Centerville	Houston	GA	32.6107°N 83.7144°W	07:44–07:46	1.24 mi (2.00 km)	150 yd (140 m)
EF0	A very brief tornado touched down in a small forested area in town, snapping a few trees and damaging power lines and poles. A few retail signs were damaged as well.						
EF1	SW of Cordele	Crisp	GA	31.9113°N 83.922°W	08:49–08:56	5.55 mi (8.93 km)	300 yd (270 m)
EF1	A waterspout began over Lake Blackshear and moved ashore, damaging numerous trees on the lake. Several homes sustained significant damage due to falling trees and others were dealt roof damage. Two farm pivot-irrigation systems were flipped and a few more trees were snapped before the tornado lifted.						
EF0	SW Ponte Vedra	St. Johns	FL	30.0759°N 81.47°W	16:08–16:09	0.25 mi (0.40 km)	125 yd (114 m)
EF0	A weak tornado damaged a lanai screen, removed shingles off a home, and blew a fence out.						
EF1	NNE of Farnham to ESE of Lodge	Richmond, Northumberland	VA	37.933°N 76.6004°W	20:04–20:10	5.78 mi (9.30 km)	100 yd (91 m)
EF1	A tornado demolished a storage shed and uprooted numerous trees as it touched down. The tornado quickly moved northeast through a golf course where additional trees and sheds were damaged. After exiting the golf course, two houses saw portions of their roofs peeled off. More roof damage on houses occurred and more trees were uprooted before the tornado lifted.						

=== April 7 event ===
List of confirmed tornadoes – Sunday, April 7, 2024
EF#	Location	County / Parish	State	Start Coord.	Time (UTC)	Path length	Max width
EF1	NW of Williams	Hamilton, Wright	IA	42.5569°N 93.5764°W	20:50–20:53	0.54 mi (0.87 km)	70 yd (64 m)
EF1	A tornado touched down in extreme northern Hamilton County and quickly moved into Wright County. After crossing into Wright County, the tornado immediately impacted a hog confinement building, severely damaging the back third of it before dissipating just north of the complex.						
EF1	WNW of Vernon	Marion	IL	38.812°N 89.137°W	22:21–22:23	1.26 mi (2.03 km)	25 yd (23 m)
EF1	A pole barn was heavily damaged with multiple walls collapsing and an outbuilding suffered roofing loss.						

=== April 9 event ===
List of confirmed tornadoes – Tuesday, April 9, 2024
EF#	Location	County / Parish	State	Start Coord.	Time (UTC)	Path length	Max width
EF0	NE of Redwood	Warren	MS	32.5017°N 90.7213°W	01:00–01:04	2.09 mi (3.36 km)	150 yd (140 m)
EF0	A weak tornado downed trees and large branches; one tree fell onto a church.						
EF1	N of Learned	Hinds	MS	32.2262°N 90.5755°W	01:23–01:34	8.1 mi (13.0 km)	150 yd (140 m)
EF1	A tornado touched down and damaged branches in open farmland before intensifying and destroying two outbuildings. The tornado continued east-northeast damaging more trees, roofs, power lines, and fencing. A few homes were more heavily damaged due to trees falling on them.						
EF0	W of Hornbeck	Sabine	LA	31.305°N 93.6019°W	01:56–02:04	3.51 mi (5.65 km)	440 yd (400 m)
EF0	Multiple trees were snapped or uprooted by this weak tornado.						

=== April 10 event ===
List of confirmed tornadoes – Wednesday, April 10, 2024
EF#	Location	County / Parish	State	Start Coord.	Time (UTC)	Path length	Max width
EF1	Western Houston	Harris	TX	29.7716°N 95.7524°W	07:47–07:49	1.68 mi (2.70 km)	300 yd (270 m)
EF1	A Firestone tire shop was destroyed and a commercial strip mall was significantly damaged. The building room and southern outer wall of the latter structure failed. A large AC unit was thrown into the parking lot. Many trees were snapped and uprooted.						
EF0	NW of Madison	Madison	MS	32.5369°N 90.2021°W	09:35–09:36	0.7 mi (1.1 km)	150 yd (140 m)
EF0	A brief tornado produced intermittent tree damage.						
EF2	Port Arthur	Jefferson	TX	29.8863°N 93.9423°W	10:55–10:59	2.7 mi (4.3 km)	300 yd (270 m)
EF2	A Baptist church had a large portion of its walls collapse, a home had its roof completely removed, and numerous other homes sustained roof damage along the path. Trees were also downed or damaged. This tornado may have continued as a waterspout over Sabine Lake.						
EF1	E of Hackberry	Cameron	LA	29.9906°N 93.2479°W	11:30–11:33	3.11 mi (5.01 km)	150 yd (140 m)
EF1	An unstrapped manufactured home was flipped and destroyed, an RV and a small outbuilding were overturned, and trees were damaged.						
EF1	ENE of Hackberry	Cameron	LA	30.0166°N 93.2505°W	11:31–11:35	3.08 mi (4.96 km)	100 yd (91 m)
EF1	A tornado tore a metal awning from a storage building and tossed it about 300 ft (91 m). Wooden utility poles were bent and trees were damaged.						
EF2	Southern Lake Charles	Calcasieu	LA	30.1822°N 93.2148°W	11:38–11:42	1.05 mi (1.69 km)	150 yd (140 m)
EF2	A strong tornado began on the eastern side of McNeese State University before moving east and damaging a nearby health complex. The tornado continued further east and intensified, destroying the roofs of several homes and causing widespread tree and power line damage. The tornado dissipated shortly after.						
EF1	SW of Holmwood	Calcasieu	LA	30.1026°N 93.0903°W	11:41–11:42	0.83 mi (1.34 km)	100 yd (91 m)
EF1	A brief tornado destroyed a sheet metal carport, caused overhang/fascia damage to a home, overturned an unanchored wooden storage barn, and damaged trees.						
EF1	Lake Charles	Calcasieu	LA	30.2067°N 93.2188°W	11:41–11:42	0.13 mi (0.21 km)	100 yd (91 m)
EF1	A very brief tornado caused extensive damage to a bar. An outbuilding lost a portion of its roof as well.						
EF1	S of Lacassine to S of Welsh	Jefferson Davis	LA	30.1939°N 92.9268°W	11:51–11:58	6.62 mi (10.65 km)	300 yd (270 m)
EF1	A metal building had part of its roof ripped off. Damage was inflicted to trees, manufactured homes, several metal outbuildings, and utility poles.						
EF1	N of Washington	St. Landry	LA	30.6552°N 92.0735°W	12:17–12:19	1.24 mi (2.00 km)	200 yd (180 m)
EF1	A carport was destroyed, homes sustained minor roof damage, and trees were damaged. Utility poles were leaned over as well.						
EF1	ESE of Church Point	Acadia, St. Landry	LA	30.3933°N 92.1771°W	12:37–12:38	0.07 mi (0.11 km)	100 yd (91 m)
EF1	A very brief tornado destroyed a grain bin and damaged trees.						
EF1	N of Port Barre	St. Landry	LA	30.6033°N 91.9579°W	12:38–12:39	0.05 mi (0.080 km)	150 yd (140 m)
EF1	A very brief tornado along the leading edge of a squall line crossed LA 103, twisting off large tree limbs and snapping trees.						
EF1	SSW of Morganza to WSW of Spillman	Pointe Coupee, West Feliciana	LA	30.69°N 91.61°W	12:58–13:18	24.03 mi (38.67 km)	250 yd (230 m)
EF1	A long-tracked, high-end EF1 tornado began south of Morganza, embedded in a line of thunderstorms. It quickly moved northeast over rural lands before causing tree damage. The tree damage became increasingly widespread and intense as the tornado crossed the Mississippi River. High-resolution satellite imagery identified a swath of tree damage roughly 400 yd (370 m) in width in the Cat Island National Wildlife Refuge. The tornado then merged with the 1308 UTC tornado, dissipating.						
EF2	N of St. Francisville, LA to NW of Norwood, LA	West Feliciana (LA), Wilkinson (MS)	LA, MS	30.81°N 91.38°W	13:13–13:27	16.92 mi (27.23 km)	700 yd (640 m)
EF2	As the 1258 UTC tornado occluded, this strong tornado formed less than a mile east of it. As the tornado tracked more northeast, the 1258 UTC tornado merged with tornado. Trees were snapped and uprooted and homes were minorly damaged near the merge. The tornado began to grow in size and strengthened up to low-end EF2 intensity, significantly damaging trees near Wakefield. The tornado weakened from thereon, crossing into Mississippi before dissipating.						
EF1	Northern Slidell to S of Pearl River	St. Tammany	LA	30.3035°N 89.7831°W	14:49–14:55	3.38 mi (5.44 km)	200 yd (180 m)
EF1	This tornado A tornado touched down just south of I-12 in northern Slidell and tracked northeast. It crossed I-2 west of US 11, where trees were snapped. The tornado produced widespread tree damage near Alton Elementary School before crossing US 11 and continuing along LA 1091, where damage became more sporadic before dissipating as a stronger tornado formed nearby.						
EF2	Southern Slidell to SW of Napoleon	St. Tammany	LA	30.251°N 89.8143°W	15:01–15:12	11.19 mi (18.01 km)	350 yd (320 m)
EF2	This tornado started southwest of Slidell and moved northeastward into the southern part of the city. It first damaged a few businesses, blowing windows out, causing minor roof damage to metal buildings, and snapping power poles. Farther along the path, a metal business building had a failure of its roof purlins and metal beams bent; this damage was rated EF2. Two nearby apartment buildings sustained moderate roof damage. Additional homes and apartments along the path sustained lesser roof damage. The tornado ended and was absorbed by the 15:03 UTC EF1 tornado shortly after snapping a billboard along I-10 near the Louisiana–Mississippi border. Multiple injuries were reported, but the total number of them is unknown.						
EF1	Northern Slidell, LA to E of Gainesville	St. Tammany (LA), Hancock (MS)	LA, MS	30.3083°N 89.7725°W	15:03–15:15	10.34 mi (16.64 km)	175 yd (160 m)
EF1	This high-end EF1 tornado tracked just south of the I-12/I-10 split before crossing the interstates and moving east through nearby neighborhoods. It caused concentrated tree damage and widespread uprooting and broken branches. The tornado intensified across the Pearl River Wildlife Management Area, reaching its peak width near Perch Lake before gradually weakening and dissipating as it entered the grounds of Stennis Space Center.						
EF2	Southern Pearl River, LA to E of Gainesville, MS	St. Tammany (LA), Hancock (MS)	LA, MS	30.3559°N 89.7519°W	15:06–15:15	7.96 mi (12.81 km)	300 yd (270 m)
EF2	A strong tornado began near the intersection of US 11 and LA 41 in Pearl River, snapping and tossing numerous tree branches. It quickly intensified after crossing I-59, producing damage across the Pearl River Basin. Extensive wind damage occurred south of the main track as it neared the Louisiana–Mississippi border, and after entering the Stennis Space Center property, the tornado damaged a metal outbuilding before dissipating amid complex tornadic interactions in the area.						
EF1	E of Gainesville	Hancock	MS	30.3601°N 89.6198°W	15:15–15:18	3.43 mi (5.52 km)	100 yd (91 m)
EF1	This tornado touched down in a complex scenario and remained over Stennis Space Center. A couple swaths of trees were snapped and uprooted.						
EF1	ENE of Gainesville to WSW of Kiln	Hancock	MS	30.355°N 89.6191°W	15:15–15:27	10.26 mi (16.51 km)	150 yd (140 m)
EF1	This tornado touched down alongside the previous tornado over Stennis Space Center. At the space center, widespread tree damage occurred and a light pole was removed from its concrete pedestal. Moving east, numerous trees were snapped and a transmission pole was tilted. Tree damage continued until the tornado lifted after crossing the Jourdan River.						
EF1	NNE of Gainesville to W of Kiln	Hancock	MS	30.3911°N 89.6003°W	15:17–15:24	5.29 mi (8.51 km)	200 yd (180 m)
EF1	A third tornado began at the Stennis Space Center, this time on the northern half of the complex. A few branches were broken and a few trees were snapped along this tornado's path.						
EF1	W of Kiln	Hancock	MS	30.4128°N 89.5306°W	15:23–15:27	2.68 mi (4.31 km)	100 yd (91 m)
EF1	A tornado tracked through rural forest and wetland areas= following the Catahoula Creek and Jourdan River basin. High-resolution satellite imagery revealed numerous trees uprooted or snapped along the path, which aided in assigning a rating. The tornado eventually dissipated as it interacted with its parent mesovortex to the east.						
EF1	N of Kiln (1st tornado)	Hancock	MS	30.4416°N 89.4502°W	15:28–15:33	2.98 mi (4.80 km)	150 yd (140 m)
EF1	This high-end EF1 tornado caused localized damage to trees and structures.						
EF0	N of Kiln (2nd tornado)	Hancock	MS	30.4511°N 89.4439°W	15:31–15:34	2.73 mi (4.39 km)	75 yd (69 m)
EF0	This high-end EF0 tornado caused localized tree damage.						
EF0	SW of Lizana (1st tornado)	Harrison	MS	30.5009°N 89.3236°W	15:40–15:46	5.07 mi (8.16 km)	100 yd (91 m)
EF0	A tornado tracked over mainly inaccessible rural land initially before sliding a mobile home off its foundation. The tornado crossed the Wolf River before lifting.						
EF1	SW of Lizana (2nd tornado)	Harrison	MS	30.5246°N 89.2719°W	15:44–15:46	1.49 mi (2.40 km)	75 yd (69 m)
EF1	A brief tornado rolled a manufactured home and caused tree damage.						
EF0	WNW of Vancleave	Jackson	MS	30.5936°N 88.8283°W	16:14–16:16	2.22 mi (3.57 km)	25 yd (23 m)
EF0	This very weak tornado did minor tree damage.						
EF1	W of Chunchula	Mobile	AL	30.9186°N 88.2743°W	17:20–17:21	0.19 mi (0.31 km)	25 yd (23 m)
EF1	A brief tornado touched down, removed the roof of a home, and snapped some large branches.						
EF1	Northern Bellview	Escambia	FL	30.48°N 87.31°W	18:33–18:36	2.26 mi (3.64 km)	150 yd (140 m)
EF1	Numerous large trees were snapped or uprooted. Fallen trees caused significant structural damage to one frame house and three manufactured homes.						
EF1	SE of Pace	Santa Rosa	FL	30.57°N 87.15°W	18:48–18:50	2.48 mi (3.99 km)	75 yd (69 m)
EF1	Numerous homes sustained shingle damage and lost fences. One home was impaled by multiple 2x4s. Numerous trees were snapped or uprooted. A small metal shed was tossed.						

=== April 11 event ===
List of confirmed tornadoes – Thursday, April 11, 2024
EF#	Location	County / Parish	State	Start Coord.	Time (UTC)	Path length	Max width
EF1	SE of Green Cove Springs to WNW of Saint Augustine	St. Johns	FL	29.8853°N 81.5626°W	15:33–15:45	6.7 mi (10.8 km)	310 yd (280 m)
EF1	Numerous homes had blown out windows and roof damage, fences were blown down, and many trees were snapped or uprooted.						
EF1	Wilkesboro	Wilkes	NC	36.12°N 81.17°W	22:43–22:50	6 mi (9.7 km)	150 yd (140 m)
EF1	A tornado struck Wilkesboro breaking power poles, damaging two churches, destroying an outbuilding, ripping shingles off an apartment complex, damaging a chimney on a home, bending the canopy of a gas station and snapping or uprooting numerous trees.						
EF1	Mount Ulla	Rowan	NC	35.656°N 80.731°W	23:52–23:54	1.31 mi (2.11 km)	40 yd (37 m)
EF1	One structure had a significant amount of its roof covering material ripped off and its roof deck uplifted. The chimney and garage doors were collapsed, and the entire structure was shifted off its foundation as well. The tornado affected an elementary school, peeling metal sheeting from the gym building and breaking old wooden poles. Large trees were snapped or uprooted.						
EF1	NW of Swansonville	Pittsvylania	VA	36.76°N 79.59°W	01:27–01:33	0.89 mi (1.43 km)	250 yd (230 m)
EF1	Numerous trees were snapped or uprooted.						

=== April 12 event ===
List of confirmed tornadoes – Friday, April 12, 2024
EF#	Location	County / Parish	State	Start Coord.	Time (UTC)	Path length	Max width
EF1	Somo	Mason	KY	38.5995°N 83.7325°W	22:41–22:43	0.75 mi (1.21 km)	75 yd (69 m)
EF1	Outbuildings were destroyed and several trees were broken and uprooted.						

=== April 16 event ===
List of confirmed tornadoes – Tuesday, April 16, 2024
EF#	Location	County / Parish	State	Start Coord.	Time (UTC)	Path length	Max width
EF0	N of Athol to SE of Franklin	Smith	KS	39.8987°N 98.8876°W	06:53–07:00	6.81 mi (10.96 km)	35 yd (32 m)
EF0	A small mobile building was overturned, and some trees were damaged.						
EF0	WNW of Cowles	Webster	NE	40.2037°N 98.5264°W	07:28–07:29	0.8 mi (1.3 km)	30 yd (27 m)
EF0	A brief tornado caused minor tree damage and tossed some corn stalks.						
EF1	SE of Eureka	Greenwood	KS	37.76°N 96.29°W	09:21–09:37	7.5 mi (12.1 km)	200 yd (180 m)
EF1	Numerous large trees were snapped or uprooted.						
EF1	N of Olivet to WSW of Lyndon	Osage	KS	38.55°N 95.7523°W	10:51–10:57	3.48 mi (5.60 km)	100 yd (91 m)
EF1	A home was shifted off its foundation and trees were damaged.						
EF1	SW of Overbrook to W of Richland	Osage, Shawnee	KS	38.711°N 95.6427°W	11:06–11:27	12.8 mi (20.6 km)	75 yd (69 m)
EF1	Several structures were damaged by this EF1 tornado, including an RV that was flipped over and destroyed, injuring the two occupants.						
EF2	S of Virgil	Greenwood	KS	37.92°N 96.01°W	12:34–12:42	2.7 mi (4.3 km)	116 yd (106 m)
EF2	A strong tornado ripped a large outbuilding from its foundation and bent steel purlins. Several large trees were snapped or uprooted as well.						
EF0	NE of Maryville	Nodaway	MO	40.3453°N 94.8188°W	13:50–13:53	3.37 mi (5.42 km)	50 yd (46 m)
EF0	A tornado was confirmed east of town and tracked over rural land.						
EF1	W of Hopkins	Nodaway	MO	40.5455°N 94.887°W	14:00–14:01	0.59 mi (0.95 km)	50 yd (46 m)
EF1	A brief tornado damaged structures are two properties.						
EF0	WNW of Bedford	Taylor	IA	40.6649°N 94.7953°W	14:12–14:15	2.62 mi (4.22 km)	50 yd (46 m)
EF0	Light damage occurred to outbuildings.						
EF0	N of Carbon	Adams	IA	41.0646°N 94.8234°W	14:31–14:34	2.41 mi (3.88 km)	50 yd (46 m)
EF0	A house lost some shingles and a few outbuildings were damaged.						
EF1	Southwestern Anita	Cass	IA	41.4275°N 94.767°W	14:58–14:59	0.87 mi (1.40 km)	30 yd (27 m)
EF1	A tornado began in Lake Anita State Park, damaging trees. The tornado moved northwest through a small subdivision and inflicted slight damage before dissipating.						
EF1	ENE of Smithville to Paradise	Clay	MO	39.3962°N 94.528°W	15:13–15:18	2.36 mi (3.80 km)	50 yd (46 m)
EF1	This tornado moved over the Smithville Reservoir and Camp Branch. The KCTA (Kansas City Trapshooters Association) complex suffered considerable damage with the main building losing a portion of its roof, which damaged an exterior wall. The facility was forced to shut down and cancel all activities until further notice. A trailer was blown over and trees were damaged along the path as well.						
EF0	N of Dallas Center to NE of Minburn	Dallas	IA	41.7014°N 93.9973°W	16:05–16:14	6.96 mi (11.20 km)	60 yd (55 m)
EF0	Several farm outbuildings sustained mostly minor damage.						
EF0	WSW of Platte Center to E of Tarnov	Platte	NE	41.51°N 97.55°W	16:35–16:51	8.44 mi (13.58 km)	50 yd (46 m)
EF0	A weak tornado was well-documented but did not cause any damage. The basis for the EF0 rating was from the tornado going over some center pivot irrigation systems without tipping them over.						
EF0	S of Creston	Platte	NE	41.68°N 97.37°W	17:37–17:42	2.91 mi (4.68 km)	30 yd (27 m)
EF0	A few sheds and outbuildings were flipped over or had roofing material ripped away. A detached garage had its roof removed and walls collapsed.						
EF0	S of Clarkson	Colfax	NE	41.68°N 97.12°W	18:18–18:23	1.08 mi (1.74 km)	30 yd (27 m)
EF0	A weak tornado minorly damaged tree branches.						
EF0	S of Howells	Colfax	NE	41.62°N 97.04°W	18:39–18:49	5.21 mi (8.38 km)	40 yd (37 m)
EF0	Two center pivots were damaged, and tin roofing material was removed from small outbuildings.						
EFU	NW of Hinton	Plymouth	IA	42.637°N 96.302°W	18:46	0.01 mi (0.016 km)	10 yd (9.1 m)
EFU	A member of the Hinton police department witnessed a brief tornado touchdown in an open field.						
EFU	WSW of Le Mars	Plymouth	IA	42.759°N 96.2623°W	18:48	0.01 mi (0.016 km)	10 yd (9.1 m)
EFU	A tornado touched down briefly in an open field and was filmed.						
EF1	SW of Struble	Plymouth	IA	42.86°N 96.238°W	19:00–19:03	1.32 mi (2.12 km)	25 yd (23 m)
EF1	An outbuilding was destroyed and a garage door was blown off of a home. A tree was also uprooted at a farmstead.						
EFU	N of Struble	Sioux	IA	42.924°N 96.194°W	19:11	0.01 mi (0.016 km)	10 yd (9.1 m)
EFU	An emergency manager witnessed a brief tornado in an open field.						
EF1	WNW of Rands to ENE of Rockwell City	Calhoun	IA	42.3355°N 94.5927°W	19:26–19:38	5.22 mi (8.40 km)	75 yd (69 m)
EF1	A storm chaser filmed the entire life cycle of this tornado. Damage included telephone poles and minor damage at a farmstead.						
EF0	NNW of Sioux Center	Sioux	IA	43.097°N 96.193°W	19:27–19:29	0.89 mi (1.43 km)	25 yd (23 m)
EF0	A brief, high-end EF0 tornado uprooted several large pine trees on a tree line. The tornado then struck a farmstead, collapsing a barn and tossing tin into a nearby field before lifting.						
EF0	N of Sioux Center	Sioux	IA	43.113°N 96.167°W	19:30–19:31	0.25 mi (0.40 km)	25 yd (23 m)
EF0	Several large tree branches were broken at a residence.						
EFU	SSW of Manson	Calhoun	IA	42.5027°N 94.5395°W	19:57–19:58	0.61 mi (0.98 km)	30 yd (27 m)
EFU	A storm chaser filmed a weak tornado over open rural farmland.						
EF1	WNW of Matlock	Sioux, Lyon	IA	43.257°N 96.006°W	19:8–20:01	1.07 mi (1.72 km)	75 yd (69 m)
EF1	A tornado struck a golf course, uprooting several trees and damaging a maintenance shed. As the tornado continued northeast, it impacted a farmstead where it destroyed an outbuilding and uprooted several more trees. The debris from the outbuilding was strewn across a field before the tornado lifted.						
EF1	NW of Quasqueton to NE of Winthrop	Buchanan	IA	42.41°N 91.79°W	20:02–20:15	10.01 mi (16.11 km)	125 yd (114 m)
EF1	A high-end EF1 tornado began near the Pine Creek Wildlife area, damaging several trees. The tornado tracked northeast, continuing to snap and uproot more trees, especially near a cemetery. Before dissipating, the tornado then damaged an outbuilding at a farmstead and overturned a semi-truck.						
EF0	E of Palmer	Pocahontas	IA	42.614°N 94.5218°W	20:11–20:15	1.66 mi (2.67 km)	75 yd (69 m)
EF0	A tornado that was recorded by a storm chaser caused minor tree damage at a farmstead.						
EFU	S of Rolfe	Pocahontas	IA	42.7725°N 94.5167°W	20:32–20:35	1.44 mi (2.32 km)	75 yd (69 m)
EFU	A tornado was filmed over rural farmland.						
EF0	E of Rolfe	Pocahontas	IA	42.8098°N 94.5198°W	20:41–20:43	0.64 mi (1.03 km)	40 yd (37 m)
EF0	A storm chaser filmed a brief tornado just to the east of Rolfe. Minor damage occurred at a couple farmsteads along with some tree damage.						
EF2	WSW of Houghton to NW of New London to NNE of Toolesboro	Lee, Henry, Des Moines, Louisa	IA	40.77°N 91.64°W	21:25–22:21	41.66 mi (67.05 km)	600 yd (550 m)
EF2	This long-track high-end EF2 tornado inflicted significant damage to homes, trees, and outbuildings on numerous farmsteads. One brick home had its roof removed, a collapse of an exterior wall, and its garage destroyed. Numerous outbuildings were also destroyed nearby. Further along the path, more trees were damaged at the Port Louisa National Wildlife Refuge and a vehicle was flipped before dissipating just before crossing the state line into Illinois near the confluence of the Iowa and Mississippi Rivers.						

=== April 17 event ===
List of confirmed tornadoes – Wednesday, April 17, 2024
EF#	Location	County / Parish	State	Start Coord.	Time (UTC)	Path length	Max width
EF1	Bucyrus	Crawford	OH	40.7981°N 83.0005°W	20:06–20:11	3.47 mi (5.58 km)	100 yd (91 m)
EF1	One residence was pushed off its foundation while a second sustained roof damage. A garage and a shed were destroyed; another shed was damaged. A small trailer was rolled, three chimneys were toppled, and numerous trees were snapped or uprooted. A post office sustained roof damage, a convenience store had its roof collapsed, and an abandoned plant had one of its walls blown out. Several nearby antennas were bent as well.						
EF0	S of Cable to SW of Fountain Park	Champaign	OH	40.1277°N 83.6335°W	20:21–20:25	3 mi (4.8 km)	150 yd (140 m)
EF0	A home sustained minor roof damage, multiple outbuildings were damaged, and numerous trees were snapped or uprooted.						
EF1	SE of Harlem	Delaware	OH	40.132°N 82.8097°W	21:26–21:28	0.9 mi (1.4 km)	100 yd (91 m)
EF1	Multiple homes sustained damage, including blown out windows, garage door failures, and moderate roof removal. Trees were damaged as well.						
EF1	W of Windham to E of Mahoning	Portage	OH	41.2323°N 81.0813°W	22:45–22:51	3.97 mi (6.39 km)	65 yd (59 m)
EF1	Multiple homes and other buildings sustained varying levels of damage to their roofs, siding, and windows. Numerous trees were snapped or uprooted, some of which fell onto homes. A large garage and a manufactured home were significantly damaged. The tornado crossed the Ohio Turnpike, hitting three tractor trailers and causing the highway to be temporarily shut down. A car and a boat were flipped on a nearby road.						
EF0	NNW of Champion	Trumbull	OH	41.3058°N 80.9112°W	23:01–23:06	2.95 mi (4.75 km)	20 yd (18 m)
EF0	A weak tornado caused significant damage to a garage, caused some damage to roofing, and downed numerous trees. Some fallen trees caused additional damage to homes.						

=== April 18 event ===
List of confirmed tornadoes – Thursday, April 18, 2024
EF#	Location	County / Parish	State	Start Coord.	Time (UTC)	Path length	Max width
EF0	NE of Airway Heights	Spokane	WA	47.6571°N 117.5586°W	20:30–20:35	0.01 mi (0.016 km)	5 yd (4.6 m)
EF0	A small, stationary landspout tornado was observed.						
EFU	N of Greenfield to WNW of Barr	Greene, Macoupin	IL	39.387°N 90.212°W	21:51–22:04	4.31 mi (6.94 km)	10 yd (9.1 m)
EFU	A likely intermittent tornado was observed by storm chasers and spotters over open farm land.						
EF1	S of Eureka to High Ridge	St. Louis, Jefferson	MO	38.464°N 90.665°W	22:30–22:39	7.78 mi (12.52 km)	40 yd (37 m)
EF1	A tornado began in a subdivision near Eureka, causing minor tree damage. The tornado crossed the Meramec River into Jefferson County, where it damaged two large metal outbuildings and snapped wooden electrical poles. The tornado continued east causing tree damage before lifting.						
EFU	WSW of Kemper	Jersey	IL	39.2156°N 90.1817°W	22:36–22:37	0.02 mi (0.032 km)	10 yd (9.1 m)
EFU	A trained spotter reported a brief tornado. No damage was found.						
EF1	S of Standard City	Macoupin	IL	39.31°N 89.791°W	22:52–22:53	0.23 mi (0.37 km)	75 yd (69 m)
EF1	Moderate roof damage was inflicted to three farm buildings and several large limbs were torn off of trees.						
EF0	Southern Pontoon Beach	Madison	IL	38.706°N 90.06°W	22:52–22:53	0.91 mi (1.46 km)	100 yd (91 m)
EF0	A weak tornado touched down east of Horseshoe Lake, damaging tree limbs.						
EF1	NNW of Midway to S of Prairietown	Madison	IL	38.947°N 89.976°W	22:57–23:01	3.14 mi (5.05 km)	75 yd (69 m)
EF1	A tornado touched down and immediately damaged the roof on two farm buildings. The tornado then tracked east-northeast, causing considerable damage to outbuildings, trees and fences. Minor roof damage to a house and major damage to an outbuilding occurred before the tornado dissipated.						
EF0	Southern Cahokia	St. Clair	IL	38.552°N 90.177°W	22:58–22:59	1.09 mi (1.75 km)	35 yd (32 m)
EF0	Several large trees were snapped and uprooted as a tornado touched down in a subdivision. One of the uprooted trees landed on a house causing moderate roof damage. The tornado then moved east, crossing I-255, damaged some more trees and quickly ended.						
EF0	NE of Troy	Madison	IL	38.752°N 89.831°W	23:09–23:10	0.33 mi (0.53 km)	75 yd (69 m)
EF0	A residence sustained minor roof damage, numerous tree limbs were snapped and several large trees were uprooted.						
EF0	N of Marine	Madison	IL	38.798°N 89.808°W	23:13–23:16	4.37 mi (7.03 km)	100 yd (91 m)
EF0	A tornado blew down several tree limbs, snapped a large pine tree, blew a metal canopy off a roof and blew shed doors down.						
EF0	Latham	Logan	IL	39.96°N 89.22°W	00:18–00:23	3.77 mi (6.07 km)	200 yd (180 m)
EF0	A business had its roof blown off, trees were damaged, and a field was scoured. A semi-truck was overturned, injuring the driver.						
EF1	E of Latham to WNW of Warrensburg	Logan, Macon	IL	39.95°N 89.16°W	00:23–00:25	2.15 mi (3.46 km)	300 yd (270 m)
EF1	Several outbuildings were damaged, with debris tossed upwards of 2 mi (3.2 km) away. Several homes and trees were damaged in Warrensburg as well.						
EF1	Warrensburg to W of Forsyth	Macon	IL	39.93°N 89.09°W	00:27–00:32	3.71 mi (5.97 km)	200 yd (180 m)
EF1	A tornado struck Warrensburg, damaging the roofs of several homes and numerous trees inside the town. The tornado continued east of town, snapping a few more large trees before dissipating.						
EF1	SW of Emery to WNW of Argenta	Macon	IL	39.96°N 88.97°W	00:37–00:45	7.19 mi (11.57 km)	500 yd (460 m)
EF1	Grain bins, six power poles, and numerous trees were damaged. A semi-truck was also blown over.						

=== April 19 event ===
List of confirmed tornadoes – Friday, April 19, 2024
EF#	Location	County / Parish	State	Start Coord.	Time (UTC)	Path length	Max width
EF0	SE of Anchorage	Anchorage	AK	61.13°N 149.66°W	04:13	0.01 mi (0.016 km)	1 yd (0.91 m)
EF0	A weak landspout was observed by a storm spotter over a mountain in Chugach State Park. This was the first tornado recorded in the state of Alaska in 19 years, and only the fifth in state history.						

=== April 25 event ===
List of confirmed tornadoes – Thursday, April 25, 2024
EF#	Location	County / Parish	State	Start Coord.	Time (UTC)	Path length	Max width
EFU	Northern Herriman	Salt Lake	UT	40.53°N 112.01°W	17:07–17:12	Unknown	Unknown
EFU	A landspout had numerous photos and videos taken of it. No damage was noted.						
EFU	ESE of Huntley	Goshen	WY	41.92°N 104.09°W	21:15–21:25	0.92 mi (1.48 km)	20 yd (18 m)
EFU	A stationary tornado was reported by numerous sources.						
EFU	ESE of Woodrow	Washington	CO	39.97°N 103.37°W	21:25–21:26	0.25 mi (0.40 km)	50 yd (46 m)
EFU	Multiple photos were taken of a tornado and posted on social media. A webcam also caught the tornado on video.						
EFU	SSW of Bird City	Cheyenne	KS	39.6088°N 101.5899°W	21:45–21:48	0.01 mi (0.016 km)	10 yd (9.1 m)
EFU	A brief, small tornado was reported. No damage was found.						
EFU	E of Clarkville	Yuma	CO	40.3674°N 102.5126°W	23:15–23:18	0.04 mi (0.064 km)	100 yd (91 m)
EFU	A landspout tornado remained stationary over open rangeland.						
EFU	E of Clarkville	Yuma	CO	40.3999°N 102.4699°W	23:29–23:31	0.22 mi (0.35 km)	100 yd (91 m)
EFU	A tornado was filmed over open fields.						

=== April 26 event ===
List of confirmed tornadoes – Friday, April 26, 2024
EF#	Location	County / Parish	State	Start Coord.	Time (UTC)	Path length	Max width
EF0	NNW of Pink	Cleveland	OK	35.306°N 97.177°W	09:49–09:50	0.54 mi (0.87 km)	30 yd (27 m)
EF0	A brief tornado caused sporadic tree damage, damaged the roof of a mobile home, and scattered sheet metal.						
EF0	SSE of Newalla (1st tornado)	Pottawatomie	OK	35.333°N 97.141°W	09:52–09:55	2.4 mi (3.9 km)	40 yd (37 m)
EF0	Two barns had siding damage and some trees were damaged as well. The tornado was then absorbed by the EF1 tornado below.						
EF1	SSE of Newalla (2nd tornado)	Cleveland, Pottawatomie	OK	35.352°N 97.143°W	09:53–09:56	1.93 mi (3.11 km)	75 yd (69 m)
EF1	This tornado, which absorbed the EF0 tornado above, snapped trees, and inflicted roof damage to a home and an outbuilding shortly after touching down. Minor tree damage occurred along the rest of the tornado's path.						
EF0	Northwestern Shawnee	Pottawatomie	OK	35.356°N 96.969°W	10:05–10:08	2.4 mi (3.9 km)	50 yd (46 m)
EF0	This intermittent tornado inflicted minor roof damage to homes, damaged or destroyed outbuildings, damaged power lines, blew down fences, and snapped, uprooted, or damaged trees.						
EF1	NNW of Centerview to N of Paden	Pottawatomie, Lincoln, Okfuskee	OK	35.447°N 96.675°W	10:28–10:39	9.9 mi (15.9 km)	500 yd (460 m)
EF1	Homes were damaged, trees were snapped or uprooted, and power poles were blown down.						
EF0	NNE of Prague	Lincoln	OK	35.528°N 96.677°W	10:31	0.2 mi (0.32 km)	30 yd (27 m)
EF0	A home received roof damage from a brief tornado.						
EF1	NW of Okmulgee to SW of Bald Hill	Okmulgee	OK	35.656°N 96.0096°W	11:18–11:25	6.9 mi (11.1 km)	650 yd (590 m)
EF1	Numerous trees were uprooted or snapped, the roofs of a few homes were damaged, an outbuilding was damaged, and power poles were blown down by this high-end EF1 tornado.						
EF1	Northwestern McAlester	Pittsburg	OK	34.9435°N 95.7835°W	12:22–12:24	1.7 mi (2.7 km)	250 yd (230 m)
EF1	Homes had their roofs damaged, trees were uprooted and power poles were snapped.						
EF1	ENE of Ravenna	Buffalo, Sherman	NE	41.0188°N 98.8736°W	17:16–17:31	4.67 mi (7.52 km)	175 yd (160 m)
EF1	A low-end EF1 tornado caused minor damage to a catwalk at an ethanol plant, damaged a power pole, and damaged or destroyed outbuildings.						
EF0	ESE of China Spring (1st tornado)	McLennan	TX	31.6277°N 97.2599°W	17:23–17:24	0.15 mi (0.24 km)	30 yd (27 m)
EF0	A brief EF0 tornado damaged fences and snapped large tree limbs.						
EF1	ESE of China Spring (2nd tornado)	McLennan	TX	31.6316°N 97.2524°W	17:26–17:29	0.88 mi (1.42 km)	100 yd (91 m)
EF1	A brief EF1 tornado first touched down near FM 1637, before impacting Valley View west of Waco. Fences, trees, and windows were damaged along with minor roof damage. One home lost part of its roof. This was the second tornado produced by the supercell west of Waco.						
EF1	Eastern Rockville	Sherman	NE	41.0951°N 98.8275°W	17:32–17:48	5.68 mi (9.14 km)	100 yd (91 m)
EF1	This tornado touched down after the Ravenna tornado dissipated. It damaged trees, a home, a couple of grain bins and outbuildings, and snapped power poles.						
EF2	SE of West to SW of Penelope	McLennan, Hill	TX	31.7754°N 97.0496°W	17:48–18:05	5.68 mi (9.14 km)	165 yd (151 m)
EF2	This tornado first touched down southeast of West and damaged several trees and a shed. The tornado then strengthened to low-end EF2 intensity, damaging a barn and a nearby shop. It then scattered heavy farm equipment across a field before crossing into Hill County and dissipating.						
EF0	SSE of West	McLennan	TX	31.7637°N 97.0656°W	17:48–17:49	0.18 mi (0.29 km)	15 yd (14 m)
EF0	A brief EF0 tornado produced tree damage west of the Heritage Parkway (FM 2311).						
EF0	S of Farwell	Howard	NE	41.1788°N 98.6462°W	17:52–17:58	2.69 mi (4.33 km)	50 yd (46 m)
EF0	A short-lived tornado, which formed after the Rockville tornado, overturned two center irrigation pivot systems and damaged some trees. Ground scouring was also visible from the tornado.						
EF3	ESE of Farwell to N of Elba	Howard	NE	41.2028°N 98.6199°W	17:58–18:21	8.65 mi (13.92 km)	600 yd (550 m)
EF3	This intense tornado formed after the Farwell tornado dissipated. It touched down just south of Farwell and passed east of the town and crossed N-92 as it moved just east of due north, causing tree damage and overturning center irrigation pivots. The tornado then reached low-end EF2 intensity as it approached Elba, snapping power poles and uprooting trees. The tornado then reached its peak intensity of EF3 as it struck a farmstead west of Elba. A well-built metal building structure was obliterated while the farmhouse, other outbuildings, vehicles, and other structures were heavily damaged. Continuing north-northeastward at EF2 strength, the tornado snapped a long stretch of power poles along N-11. The tornado then weakened, uprooting trees before dissipating over pasture fields.						
EF1	SW of Penelope	Hill	TX	31.8287°N 96.9664°W	18:06–18:07	0.2 mi (0.32 km)	55 yd (50 m)
EF1	After producing the EF2 tornado southeast of West, the same supercell produced this brief EF1 tornado that damaged two homes with one of them suffering a garage collapse as well. A few tree limbs were broken before the tornado dissipated.						
EF1	ENE of Malone to SSE of Blooming Grove	Navarro	TX	31.9508°N 96.8032°W	18:30–18:44	9.01 mi (14.50 km)	200 yd (180 m)
EF1	This tornado first touched down northwest of Navarro Mills Lake, producing tree damage. After moving east-northeast, the tornado strengthened to high-end EF1 intensity, damaging trees and several residential areas, destroying one manufactured home, and causing significant damage to sheet metal. After crossing FM 744, the tornado dissipated northwest of Dresden.						
EF2	NE of Elba to N of Wolbach	Howard, Greeley	NE	41.3446°N 98.5073°W	18:32–18:54	9.64 mi (15.51 km)	880 yd (800 m)
EF2	This large tornado developed after the Elba EF3 tornado dissipated, first damaging trees and leaned a wooden power pole. As it approached US 281/N-22, the tornado rapidly intensified to high-end EF2 strength. It destroyed a metal building and bent metal high-tension power poles. A nearby grain bin was destroyed, a center irrigation pivot was twisted and overturned, and damage to a home occurred. After crossing the highway, the tornado steadily weakened, damaging at least one other residence, outbuildings, trees, and center irrigation pivots. The tornado weakened and dissipated north of Wolbach.						
EF1	SW of Barry to NE of Emhouse	Navarro	TX	32.0764°N 96.674°W	18:46–19:05	11.3 mi (18.2 km)	200 yd (180 m)
EF1	This tornado first developed southwest of Barry before moving north of the city and causing roof and sheet metal damage to residential areas and outbuildings. A manufactured home was completely destroyed there at high-end EF1 strength. The tornado then tracked east, passing Emhouse, and causing damage to trees and outbuildings. The tornado then dissipated west of Rice, in a drainage area of Chambers Creek.						
EF1	NNW of Abbott	Hill	TX	31.883°N 97.0869°W	18:49–18:53	2.4 mi (3.9 km)	200 yd (180 m)
EF1	This tornado first uprooted and damaged trees west of I-35/US 77 near Abbott before crossing the interstate and flipping a tractor-trailer. The tornado then moved northeast-north of Abbott producing tree damage and minor damage to several homes before dissipating.						
EF2	NNE of Wolbach to W of Primrose to SW of Petersburg	Greeley, Boone	NE	41.4553°N 98.3695°W	19:04–20:10	27.25 mi (43.85 km)	500 yd (460 m)
EF2	This long-lived tornado touched down shortly after the first Wolbach EF2 tornado dissipated. Moving north-northeastward, it initially caused EF0-EF1 damage to center irrigation pivot systems and trees. The tornado then crossed into Boone County, causing minor damage to a farmhouse and damaging trees. After crossing N-56 and turning almost due north the tornado strengthened some, flipping and tossing several center irrigation pivots, snapped power poles, and lofted debris into power lines. The tornado then rapidly reached high-end EF2 intensity southwest of Primrose. A home had its three-car garage ripped away along with most of its roof, several outbuildings were damaged or destroyed, power poles were snapped, and many trees suffered extensive damage. The tornado then continued north-northeastward for several more miles, damaging trees and center pivot irrigation systems, causing extensive damage to a livestock facility, and snapping several power poles before dissipating.						
EF0	W of Rice	Navarro	TX	32.2272°N 96.5455°W	19:19–19:23	2.12 mi (3.41 km)	100 yd (91 m)
EF0	A brief tornado developed west of Rice before moving into wetlands of Cummins Creek. There, the tornado caused minor damage to trees before dissipating near I-45.						
EF0	Western Frost	Navarro	TX	32.0738°N 96.8302°W	19:30–19:31	1.14 mi (1.83 km)	100 yd (91 m)
EF0	A brief tornado moved along SH 22, causing a grain elevator to partially collapse and damaging garage doors and roofs in western portions of Frost before dissipating.						
EF1	SSE of Ulysses to SSE of Garrison	Butler	NE	41.053°N 97.109°W	19:51–20:07	8.09 mi (13.02 km)	200 yd (180 m)
EF1	This multi-vortex tornado overturned irrigation pivots and snapped several trees and a road sign across its intermittent path.						
EF3	Northeastern Lincoln to W of Waverly	Lancaster	NE	40.8575°N 96.6121°W	19:52–19:57	5.25 mi (8.45 km)	700 yd (640 m)
EF3	This intense tornado, the first one produced by the Elkhorn supercell, formed on the northeast side of Lincoln causing minor EF0 damage to a business before quickly intensifying to high-end EF2 intensity, heavily damaging a large transmission line. The tornado continued to intensify as it moved northeastward through agricultural fields, snapping power poles and large trees. The tornado reached its peak intensity of high-end EF3 intensity as it hit a manufacturing plant along US 6 where 70 employees were sheltered. The roof of the structure along with three walls of the plant failed and cars in the parking lot were damaged, including some that were thrown at least 75–100 yards (69–91 m). Northeast of this location, EF1-EF2 damage occurred as trees were snapped at a nearby business, which sustained roof and siding damage, wooden power poles were snapped, and several cars on a BNSF freight train were derailed. The tornado scattered debris through fields as it continued northeastward and crossed I-80 lifting just west of Waverly. Three people were injured.						
EF1	NW of Waverly	Lancaster	NE	40.92°N 96.56°W	19:57–20:01	2.96 mi (4.76 km)	150 yd (140 m)
EF1	The second tornado of the Elkhorn supercell spawned just before the Lincoln-Waverly EF3 dissipated. Damage occurred to trees and powerlines and two large outbuildings were destroyed.						
EF0	N of Waverly	Lancaster	NE	40.95°N 96.553°W	20:03–20:07	1.9 mi (3.1 km)	50 yd (46 m)
EF0	This weak tornado, the third from the Elkhorn supercell inflicted minor damage to trees.						
EFU	E of Garrison	Butler	NE	41.1646°N 97.0716°W	20:06–20:07	0.72 mi (1.16 km)	30 yd (27 m)
EFU	A very weak tornado briefly formed as the Garrison EF1 tornado was dissipating; no damage was found.						
EF1	NNW of Greenwood to SSE of Memphis	Lancaster, Saunders	NE	41.0301°N 96.4797°W	20:12–20:18	3.83 mi (6.16 km)	50 yd (46 m)
EF1	Tracking from Lancaster into Saunders County, this high-end EF1 tornado was the fourth tornado from the Elkhorn supercell. It moved over fields, producing a persistent surface circulation and dust whirl, and some moderate tree damage was found along the path.						
EFU	SE of Albion	Boone	NE	41.65°N 97.93°W	20:27–20:28	1.01 mi (1.63 km)	50 yd (46 m)
EFU	A tornado was filmed and it did not cause damage.						
EF4	SE of Yutan, NE to Western Elkhorn, NE to S of Modale, IA	Douglas (NE), Washington (NE), Harrison (IA)	NE, IA	41.1999°N 96.3267°W	20:30–21:31	32.50 mi (52.30 km)	1,900 yd (1,700 m)
EF4	See article on this tornado – Four people were injured.						
EF2	NNE of Longton to W of Fredonia	Elk, Wilson	KS	37.4598°N 96.0134°W	20:32–20:46	8.47 mi (13.63 km)	100 yd (91 m)
EF2	An EF2 tornado first developed in Elk County, uprooting and damaging trees, before crossing into Wilson County and destroying a barn. A two-story home was mostly unroofed, a water tower was unroofed, and a metal fence was also destroyed. The tornado continued to move northeast while producing tree damage before dissipating southwest of Fredonia.						
EF2	NE of Coyville to SSW of Yates Center	Wilson, Woodson	KS	37.7262°N 95.8364°W	20:34–20:50	6.71 mi (10.80 km)	100 yd (91 m)
EF2	A low-end EF2 tornado destroyed outbuildings and snapped trees at their bases.						
EFU	NE of Albion	Boone	NE	41.71°N 97.9°W	20:42–20:44	2.03 mi (3.27 km)	100 yd (91 m)
EFU	A tornado was filmed and it did not cause damage.						
EF0	W of Fredonia	Wilson	KS	37.5304°N 95.8562°W	20:52–20:55	0.99 mi (1.59 km)	150 yd (140 m)
EF0	An EF0 tornado developed just west of Fredonia after the Busby–Fredonia EF2 tornado dissipated. It damaged parts of the metal roofs of buildings at the fairgrounds before dissipating.						
EF1	SSE of Creston	Platte	NE	41.6004°N 97.3551°W	21:07–21:20	4.79 mi (7.71 km)	100 yd (91 m)
EF1	A tornado was observed to be touching down by trained spotters and it immediately flipped a center pivot irrigation system. The tornado continued north-northeast intermittently, before reaching a homestead. At the homestead, trees were snapped, windows were blown out and a barn was dealt significant roof damage. The tornado continued north, minorly damaging fencing and a pole before becoming intermittent once more and lifting shortly after.						
EF1	E of Benedict	Wilson	KS	37.6281°N 95.6515°W	21:13–21:16	1.28 mi (2.06 km)	60 yd (55 m)
EF1	This tornado first produced tree damage near a cemetery before moving northeast and damaged a barn before dissipating.						
EF1	S of Pisgah to SW of Moorhead	Harrison, Monona	IA	41.7478°N 95.9148°W	21:52–22:09	9.12 mi (14.68 km)	766 yd (700 m)
EF1	A high-end EF1 tornado damaged or destroyed outbuildings, snapped wooden power poles, and damaged trees and homes. This was the sixth tornado produced by the Elkhorn supercell.						
EF1	NNW of Pacific Junction to NW of Glenwood	Mills	IA	41.0344°N 95.8051°W	21:52–21:57	2.7 mi (4.3 km)	80 yd (73 m)
EF1	A tornado developed north of Pacific Junction damaging trees and power poles. Moving generally northward, the tornado crossed US 34/US 275, ripping a large portion of the roof off of a house and flipping a large camper on its side. The tornado then moved through a forested area, where many tree were snapped before the tornado dissipated.						
EF3	Western Council Bluffs, IA to Northeastern Omaha, NE to S of Beebeetown, IA	Pottawattamie (IA), Douglas (NE), Harrison (IA)	IA, NE	41.262°N 95.903°W	21:54–22:28	19.06 mi (30.67 km)	550 yd (500 m)
EF3	See section on this tornado						
EF0	ESE of Pisgah	Harrison	IA	41.8021°N 95.8899°W	21:59–22:04	2.64 mi (4.25 km)	200 yd (180 m)
EF0	This tornado, the seventh produced by the Elkhorn supercell, was a satellite to the 2152 UTC tornado.						
EF3	Dumfries to ENE of McClelland	Pottawattamie	IA	41.1833°N 95.7307°W	22:08–22:28	13.31 mi (21.42 km)	900 yd (820 m)
EF3	This intense tornado destroyed a home, leaving only the basement behind, while other homes suffered significant roof and exterior wall damage. The tornado also destroyed a large shed, tossed a large steel horse trailer and damaged electrical poles, outbuildings, trees, including some tree trucks that were snapped. The same storm produced the EF3 Minden tornado as this tornado was dissipating.						
EFU	SSW of Verdon	Richardson	NE	40.12°N 95.72°W	22:10	0.01 mi (0.016 km)	1 yd (0.91 m)
EFU	A very brief tornado was reported; it did not cause damage.						
EF1	SE of Norfolk	Madison, Stanton	NE	41.9887°N 97.3695°W	22:16–22:19	0.72 mi (1.16 km)	100 yd (91 m)
EF1	A brief high-end EF1 tornado caused tree damage at a farmstead as well as damage to other large trees, a gymnastics gym, and a pallet plant.						
EF0	NE of Moorhead to SW of Soldier	Monona	IA	41.9447°N 95.8274°W	22:17–22:19	1.47 mi (2.37 km)	100 yd (91 m)
EF0	A weak tornado tossed around debris. It was the eighth tornado from the Elkhorn supercell.						
EF1	Western Soldier	Monona	IA	41.9711°N 95.8061°W	22:23–22:30	3.29 mi (5.29 km)	250 yd (230 m)
EF1	An EF1 tornado moved through the western part of Soldier. It was the ninth and final tornado from the Elkhorn supercell.						
EF3	ESE of McClelland to Minden to N of Defiance	Pottawattamie, Harrison, Shelby	IA	41.3221°N 95.6171°W	22:25–23:29	40.91 mi (65.84 km)	1,900 yd (1,700 m)
EF3	1 death – See article on this tornado – Three people were injured.						
EF0	NNE of Uniontown to WSW of Devon	Bourbon	KS	37.89°N 94.96°W	22:29–22:32	3.34 mi (5.38 km)	75 yd (69 m)
EF0	A high-end EF0 tornado inflicted siding damage to a home, damaged or destroyed five outbuildings, and uprooted or snapped large limbs off of trees.						
EF1	SE of Logan	Harrison	IA	41.61°N 95.72°W	22:40–22:43	1.84 mi (2.96 km)	30 yd (27 m)
EF1	The porch was ripped from a house, a large camper was destroyed, and trees were damaged.						
EFU	S of Rulo	Richardson	NE	40.04°N 95.43°W	22:45	0.01 mi (0.016 km)	1 yd (0.91 m)
EFU	A very brief tornado was reported; it did not cause damage.						
EFU	WNW of Elsmore	Allen	KS	37.8203°N 95.2306°W	23:02–23:03	0.01 mi (0.016 km)	10 yd (9.1 m)
EFU	A storm chaser filmed a tornado over open country.						
EF1	NW of Metz	Vernon	MO	37.99°N 94.51°W	23:07–23:13	3.42 mi (5.50 km)	95 yd (87 m)
EF1	Two outbuildings were destroyed, and trees were either uprooted or had large limbs snapped.						
EFU	S of Skidmore	Holt	MO	40.2497°N 95.0817°W	23:14	0.01 mi (0.016 km)	1 yd (0.91 m)
EFU	The fire department reported a weak tornado visible in open country. No damage occurred.						
EF2	SSW of Manilla to SSW of Vail	Shelby, Crawford	IA	41.8593°N 95.2603°W	23:28–23:44	9.1 mi (14.6 km)	200 yd (180 m)
EF2	A low-end EF2 tornado began near a wildlife management area and began moving due north. Trees had all their trunks snapped and branches removed. The tornado then reached its peak intensity, completely destroying a barn before lifting.						
EFU	WNW of Astor	Crawford	IA	41.8692°N 95.3294°W	23:30–23:35	2.51 mi (4.04 km)	50 yd (46 m)
EFU	A brief tornado caused no damage.						
EF0	ESE of Pleasant Gap	Bates	MO	38.1592°N 94.1396°W	23:36–23:41	0.85 mi (1.37 km)	50 yd (46 m)
EF0	Shingles and siding of a home and outbuilding were damaged and caused minor tree damage.						
EF0	WSW of Appleton City	Bates	MO	38.1655°N 94.0981°W	23:47–23:52	1.13 mi (1.82 km)	50 yd (46 m)
EF0	This tornado caused primarily tree damage.						
EF1	NE of Defiance to NW of Aspinwall	Shelby, Crawford	IA	41.816°N 95.337°W	23:49–00:08	13.03 mi (20.97 km)	200 yd (180 m)
EF1	A high-end EF1 tornado tracked northeast, impacting several farms and damaging trees and damaging or destroying outbuildings along its path. This tornado crossed paths of a tornado damage path from an hour earlier.						
EF2	NNW of Kent to Northern Creston	Adams, Union	IA	40.982°N 94.4915°W	23:52–00:10	9.71 mi (15.63 km)	350 yd (320 m)
EF2	Several homes and condos on the northwest side of Creston suffered moderate to heavy roof damage, including some that had their roofs partially removed and one home that had an exterior wall partially pulled out. A camper and farm outbuildings were damaged, minor damage was observed at athletic fields at a high school, wooden power poles were snapped, and trees were snapped or uprooted as well.						
EF0	WSW of Appleton City	St. Clair	MO	38.1911°N 94.0508°W	23:56–23:57	0.17 mi (0.27 km)	50 yd (46 m)
EF0	A brief tornado uprooted trees and downed power lines.						
EF1	NE of Creston	Union	IA	41.1073°N 94.3169°W	00:14–00:19	2.85 mi (4.59 km)	80 yd (73 m)
EF1	Three farmsteads were struck by this tornado, damaging outbuildings.						
EF2	WSW of Afton to W of Barney	Union, Madison	IA	41.0195°N 94.2701°W	00:19–00:45	13.98 mi (22.50 km)	150 yd (140 m)
EF2	A high-end EF2 tornado damaged or destroyed outbuildings including one building at the Wildlife Management Center, partially or completely removed the roofs off of homes, and damaged, snapped, or uprooted trees.						
EF1	NW of Irena, MO to ESE of Delphos, IA	Worth (MO), Ringgold (IA)	MO, IA	40.5585°N 94.4058°W	00:23–00:41	8.47 mi (13.63 km)	300 yd (270 m)
EF1	This tornado caused minor damage to a home in Missouri. After crossing the state line into Iowa, the tornado strengthened to high-end EF1 intensity, snapping and uprooting trees, damaging and destroying outbuildings, and damaging the roofs of homes.						
EF0	ESE of Clinton	Henry	MO	38.3501°N 93.7172°W	00:34–00:35	0.42 mi (0.68 km)	30 yd (27 m)
EF0	Two outbuildings made of corrugated steel and wood were damaged.						
EF1	SSE of Delphos to ENE of Mount Ayr	Ringgold	IA	40.6157°N 94.3071°W	00:36–00:56	11.68 mi (18.80 km)	300 yd (270 m)
EF1	This high-end EF1 tornado snapped or uprooted trees and damaged the roofs of homes.						
EF0	E of Clinton	Henry	MO	38.3643°N 93.6908°W	00:36–00:37	0.73 mi (1.17 km)	50 yd (46 m)
EF0	Trees and an outbuilding were damaged.						
EF1	S of Creston to NNW of Afton	Union	IA	40.9676°N 94.3476°W	00:38–00:54	9.43 mi (15.18 km)	150 yd (140 m)
EF1	A tornado damaged trees and grain bins.						
EF1	ENE of Mount Ayr to NNE of Beaconsfield	Ringgold	IA	40.73°N 94.1375°W	00:51–01:08	9.07 mi (14.60 km)	250 yd (230 m)
EF1	A high-end EF1 tornado damaged the roofs of homes, damaged outbuildings, including one that partially collapsed, damaged power poles, and snapped or uprooted trees.						
EF2	WNW of Afton to W of Lorimor	Union	IA	41.0399°N 94.2517°W	00:51–01:01	6.65 mi (10.70 km)	130 yd (120 m)
EF2	A second high-end EF2 tornado occurred just to the west of the first EF2 Afton tornado. A structure in the Wildlife Management Building area was damaged just a few hundred yards from another one that was impacted by the previous EF2 tornado. Several homes suffered extensive damage with roofs removed and exterior walls buckled. A light pole was snapped, and trees were damaged, snapped, or uprooted.						
EFU	WNW of East Peru	Madison	IA	41.2467°N 94.0068°W	00:57–00:58	0.56 mi (0.90 km)	30 yd (27 m)
EFU	This tornado remained over open country, causing no damage.						
EFU	S of Patterson	Madison	IA	41.336°N 93.8998°W	01:16–01:19	1.43 mi (2.30 km)	30 yd (27 m)
EFU	This tornado remained over open country, causing no damage.						
EF2	ESE of Diagonal to NE of Tingley	Ringgold	IA	40.7828°N 94.2923°W	01:19–01:36	10.2 mi (16.4 km)	100 yd (91 m)
EF2	A damaging, strong tornado passed directly through the town of Tingley, destroying a brick building at a park, and heavily damaging the roofs of homes, including one home that had an upper floor removed. Tree damage, as well as outbuilding and farmstead damage, occurred along the path of the tornado as well.						
EF0	WNW of Cumming	Madison, Dallas	IA	41.4856°N 93.8424°W	01:21–01:27	3.65 mi (5.87 km)	30 yd (27 m)
EF0	A power pole was leaned, trees were damaged or uprooted, and debris was scattered.						
EF2	Osceola	Clarke	IA	41.0043°N 93.7908°W	01:31–01:42	5.84 mi (9.40 km)	75 yd (69 m)
EF2	A high-end EF2 tornado damaged an outbuilding and heavily damaged a home southwest of Osceola. The tornado then moved through the town at EF0-EF1 strength, snapping trees and inflicting roof damage to homes. After exiting the town, the tornado impacted one more farmstead before dissipating.						
EF2	Southeast Des Moines to Pleasant Hill to S of Altoona	Polk	IA	41.5486°N 93.5802°W	01:50–02:02	7.61 mi (12.25 km)	150 yd (140 m)
EF2	A strong tornado struck Pleasant Hill, a suburb southeast of Des Moines. Several homes and mobile homes suffered severe roof damage, including one home that was completely unroofed, and had exterior walls knocked down. Power poles were snapped, and trees were snapped or uprooted. One injury occurred.						
EF1	ESE of Monroe to SSW of Reasnor	Jasper	IA	41.516°N 93.0929°W	02:42–02:50	4.09 mi (6.58 km)	80 yd (73 m)
EF1	A high-end EF1 tornado rolled and destroyed a mobile home, destroyed several barns, inflicted roof damage to homes and other outbuildings, and snapped or uprooted trees. One injury occurred.						
EFU	E of Reasnor to W of Killduff	Jasper	IA	41.5836°N 92.9765°W	02:55–02:58	1.66 mi (2.67 km)	50 yd (46 m)
EFU	An emergency manager reported a brief tornado over rural farmland. No damage was found.						

=== April 27 event ===
List of confirmed tornadoes – Saturday, April 27, 2024
EF#	Location	County / Parish	State	Start Coord.	Time (UTC)	Path length	Max width
EF1	ENE of Strong City	Roger Mills	OK	35.703°N 99.527°W	15:11–15:12	0.7 mi (1.1 km)	50 yd (46 m)
EF1	This tornado, which was confirmed by the Roger Mills County Emergency Manager, snapped trees.						
EF0	NW of Hammon	Roger Mills	OK	35.6914°N 99.4556°W	15:18	0.1 mi (0.16 km)	10 yd (9.1 m)
EF0	A storm chaser observed a brief tornado that caused no damage.						
EF1	Hillsdale	Garfield	OK	36.56°N 97.99°W	18:21–18:22	0.8 mi (1.3 km)	100 yd (91 m)
EF1	This tornado caused tree and powerline damage in Hillsdale according to Garfield County Emergency Management.						
EFU	NE of Robinson	Brown	KS	39.8752°N 95.4246°W	19:05–19:15	3.93 mi (6.32 km)	25 yd (23 m)
EFU	An NWS employee photographed an intermittent tornado over rural land.						
EFU	W of White Cloud	Doniphan	KS	39.9678°N 95.3281°W	19:15	0.01 mi (0.016 km)	1 yd (0.91 m)
EFU	A tornado was reported by emergency management; no damage occurred.						
EF0	S of Centralia	Nemaha	KS	39.6638°N 96.1449°W	19:31–19:32	1.03 mi (1.66 km)	20 yd (18 m)
EF0	A brief tornado produced minor tree damage and tore part of the roof off of a barn.						
EF1	SE of Peckham to W of Newkirk	Kay	OK	36.861°N 97.141°W	19:39–19:44	2.6 mi (4.2 km)	30 yd (27 m)
EF1	This high-end EF1 tornado damaged a barn and a carport and snapped trees.						
EF0	NNW of Goff	Nemaha	KS	39.6884°N 95.9459°W	19:45–19:47	0.58 mi (0.93 km)	75 yd (69 m)
EF0	A brief tornado produced minor tree limb damage.						
EF1	NNE of Newkirk to SE of Chilocco	Kay	OK	36.935°N 97.033°W	19:54–19:56	1 mi (1.6 km)	75 yd (69 m)
EF1	Outbuildings and mobile homes were damaged, and trees were snapped.						
EF2	S of Knox City to W of Rhineland	Knox	TX	33.402°N 99.817°W	20:06–20:45	12.3 mi (19.8 km)	1,000 yd (910 m)
EF2	This large tornado touched down south of Knox City and moved eastward across SH-6, snapping and uprooting trees and damaging a home. It then turned northeastward and struck the southeastern part of Knox City, damaging homes, snapping trees, and rolling an RV. At an RWD facility, two shipping containers were blown to the northeast and fences were damaged. After turning eastward and damaging outbuildings and homes and uprooting trees along SH 222 east of Knox City, the tornado again turned northeastward over open terrain and reached its maximum width. It heavily damaged or destroyed outbuildings and barns, damaged homes, and snapped or uprooted trees. It also snapped numerous wooden power poles, which was the basis for the low-end EF2 rating. The tornado then dissipated west of Rhineland.						
EF0	NNW of Stillwater	Payne	OK	36.172°N 97.129°W	20:20–20:27	5.2 mi (8.4 km)	30 yd (27 m)
EF0	This tornado damaged trees and outbuildings along a non-continuous path.						
EF2	NNE of Maple City to SSW of Dexter	Cowley	KS	37.1118°N 96.7571°W	20:28–20:32	1.29 mi (2.08 km)	100 yd (91 m)
EF2	This strong tornado first started near US 166 north of Maple City, damaging trees as it moved northward. The tornado then became multi-vortex and heavily damaged a well-built metal building, with only walls left standing. A nearby concrete brick structure and barn were also demolished. The tornado then continued northward, producing more tree damage, before dissipating.						
EF1	SSW of Dexter	Cowley	KS	37.1442°N 96.7374°W	20:36–20:39	0.64 mi (1.03 km)	20 yd (18 m)
EF1	A brief EF1 tornado damaged trees, including some that were snapped.						
EF1	W of Seymour to Lake Kemp	Baylor	TX	33.617°N 99.38°W	21:08–21:40	12.7 mi (20.4 km)	300 yd (270 m)
EF1	A silo, a couple of barns, power poles and a few trees were damaged.						
EF0	SW of Hinton	Caddo	OK	35.442°N 98.404°W	21:10–21:12	0.8 mi (1.3 km)	20 yd (18 m)
EF0	This tornado was observed by storm chasers. No damage was observed.						
EF1	S of Gentry to WNW of Martinsville	Gentry, Harrison	MO	40.2953°N 94.4246°W	21:12–21:26	11.64 mi (18.73 km)	250 yd (230 m)
EF1	This low-end EF1 tornado initially touched down along US 169, blowing over a tractor trailer. Moving northeastward, the tornado caused roof damage to a home, damaged to multiple grain bins, and destroyed a small barn. Debris from the barn was strewn around the property. The tornado continued northeastward over open fields, causing little damage before dissipating.						
EFU	NW of Seymour	Baylor	TX	33.668°N 99.358°W	21:15–21:16	0.6 mi (0.97 km)	20 yd (18 m)
EFU	This satellite tornado to the first Seymour tornado was captured by security camera video. No damage occurred.						
EF1	ESE of Geary to N of Calumet	Canadian	OK	35.61°N 98.23°W	21:29–21:39	6.75 mi (10.86 km)	50 yd (46 m)
EF1	A mobile home suffered minor damage, trailers/RVs at an oil field were rolled, and trees and power poles were downed.						
EF1	NW of Moline	Elk	KS	37.4765°N 96.3086°W	21:30–21:31	0.04 mi (0.064 km)	50 yd (46 m)
EF1	Two cedar trees were snapped in a cemetery.						
EF0	N of Kendall	Hamilton	KS	38.01°N 101.55°W	21:35	0.1 mi (0.16 km)	10 yd (9.1 m)
EF0	A tornado damaged an outbuilding and power poles.						
EF1	N of Moline	Elk	KS	37.4131°N 96.2894°W	21:39–21:44	0.48 mi (0.77 km)	40 yd (37 m)
EF1	A few trees fell onto a car, a shed had tin peeled and a smaller tree had its trunk snapped. Some power poles were damaged and branches were broken before the tornado lifted.						
EFU	S of Moline	Elk	KS	37.351°N 96.3009°W	21:42–21:44	0.01 mi (0.016 km)	15 yd (14 m)
EFU	A brief, multi-vortex tornado remained over open land.						
EFU	NE of Elk Falls	Elk	KS	37.3886°N 96.1543°W	21:54–21:55	0.01 mi (0.016 km)	30 yd (27 m)
EFU	A tornado was reported by law enforcement. No damage occurred.						
EF0	SE of Spickard to SE of Mill Grove	Grundy, Mercer	MO	40.2269°N 93.5739°W	21:58–22:07	3.96 mi (6.37 km)	75 yd (69 m)
EF0	This tornado caused sporadic and intermittent tree damage.						
EFU	NE of Fredonia	Wilson	KS	37.56°N 96.79°W	22:35–22:36	0.01 mi (0.016 km)	10 yd (9.1 m)
EFU	A brief tornado occurred in an open field.						
EFU	E of Benedict	Wilson	KS	37.6407°N 95.6511°W	22:56–22:57	0.01 mi (0.016 km)	10 yd (9.1 m)
EFU	A brief tornado was filmed. No damage occurred.						
EF0	Chautauqua (1st tornado)	Chautauqua	KS	37.0241°N 96.1801°W	23:11–23:12	0.03 mi (0.048 km)	20 yd (18 m)
EF0	A brief tornado snapped a large elm tree branch and tossed an unanchored canopy barn.						
EF0	Chautauqua (2nd tornado)	Chautauqua	KS	37.0244°N 96.1768°W	23:11–23:12	0.01 mi (0.016 km)	10 yd (9.1 m)
EF0	A second brief tornado removed some roof covering from an old, abandoned brick bank.						
EF0	NNW of Iowa Park	Wichita	TX	34.038°N 98.735°W	23:23–23:25	1.5 mi (2.4 km)	30 yd (27 m)
EF0	A weak tornado was observed by a NSSL/Texas Tech research team. No significant damage was reported.						
EFU	W of Brookfield	Linn	MO	39.7783°N 93.1212°W	23:37	0.06 mi (0.097 km)	5 yd (4.6 m)
EFU	A trained spotter reported a brief tornado that caused no damage.						
EF1	WNW of Burkburnett, TX to E of Devol, OK	Wichita (TX), Tillman (OK), Cotton (OK)	TX, OK	34.12°N 98.641°W	23:43–23:56	6.5 mi (10.5 km)	100 yd (91 m)
EF1	A tornado damaged power lines in Texas before crossing the Red River into Oklahoma. Trees and powerlines were damaged, and homes and outbuildings sustained roof damage near Devol before the tornado dissipated.						
EFU	NE of Independence	Montgomery	KS	37.26°N 95.68°W	00:45–00:46	0.01 mi (0.016 km)	20 yd (18 m)
EFU	Two photos were captured of this tornado and were posted to social media.						
EFU	SSE of Pumpkin Center	Comanche	OK	34.5365°N 98.1831°W	00:55	0.3 mi (0.48 km)	20 yd (18 m)
EFU	A storm chaser observed a brief tornado that caused no damage.						
EFU	WNW of Grainola	Osage	OK	36.959°N 96.691°W	01:16	0.1 mi (0.16 km)	75 yd (69 m)
EFU	A brief tornado was observed over open country by storm chasers.						
EF1	SSE of Butler	Bates	MO	38.2161°N 94.3123°W	01:23–01:26	2.55 mi (4.10 km)	150 yd (140 m)
EF1	This tornado caused tree damage, including some that were snapped or uprooted. Power poles were damaged as well.						
EF1	S of Altona to WNW of Lucas	Bates, Henry	MO	38.36°N 94.222°W	01:30–01:46	10.14 mi (16.32 km)	250 yd (230 m)
EF1	Several outbuildings were damaged, including one that collapsed and another that had a garage door blown in. A mobile home and other properties also suffered minor damage. Many trees along the path were also damaged, including one tree that fell on and damaged a home and power lines.						
EF0	SE of Piper	Henry	MO	38.3271°N 94.0166°W	01:45–01:48	2.36 mi (3.80 km)	150 yd (140 m)
EF0	A farm building suffered roof damage and trees were damaged as well.						
EF1	NW of Lindsay to SSW of Dibble	McClain, Grady	OK	34.898°N 97.662°W	01:53–02:01	4.4 mi (7.1 km)	225 yd (206 m)
EF1	Trees were damaged along with a mobile home and a storage trailer was rolled. The tornado never fully moved in Grady County, but its centerline briefly moved into the county.						
EF1	NNE of Dibble	McClain	OK	35.069°N 97.612°W	02:12–02:14	0.5 mi (0.80 km)	40 yd (37 m)
EF1	Trees were snapped. Much of the path was inaccessible to ground survey teams.						
EF1	NNE of Ravia to W of Reagan	Johnston	OK	34.282°N 96.731°W	02:16-02:22	4.65 mi (7.48 km)	150 yd (140 m)
EF1	Dozens of trees were snapped or uprooted, and some barns and outbuildings were damaged or destroyed at the end of the track as well.						
EF0	NNW of Cole	McClain	OK	35.105°N 97.584°W	02:17–02:20	1.67 mi (2.69 km)	40 yd (37 m)
EF0	Trees were damaged.						
EF2	N of Cole to NNW of Goldsby	McClain	OK	35.142°N 97.565°W	02:20–02:27	4.9 mi (7.9 km)	125 yd (114 m)
EF2	Some homes sustained heavy roof damage, including some that had their roofs partially removed, although the exact degree of the damage could not be determined due to the structures being in a gated community. Other homes suffered more moderate roof and exterior damage, fences were damaged, and trees were snapped or uprooted as well. The tornado crossed I-35 before dissipating.						
EF1	Northern Norman	Cleveland	OK	35.231°N 97.483°W	02:29–02:36	3.5 mi (5.6 km)	200 yd (180 m)
EF1	This intermittent EF1 tornado damaged a gas station canopy along with buildings at the Max Westheimer Airport and an industrial park. Some homes suffered minor damage, and trees were damaged as well, including some trees that were snapped or uprooted.						
EF2	Western Ardmore to S of Springer	Carter	OK	34.11°N 97.199°W	02:42–02:56	11.3 mi (18.2 km)	400 yd (370 m)
EF2	This high-end EF2 tornado moved northward through the west side of Ardmore, damaging homes and businesses, including several homes that suffered significant roof damage, damaged or destroyed outbuildings, mobile homes, RVs, and trailers, blew train cars and fences over, snapped power poles, and snapped or uprooted trees. The tornado then turned northeastward and crossed I-35, blowing cars and debris off of the interstate. There were 19 injuries. The tornado continued to snap and uproot trees before dissipating along US 77. The storm would later produce the EF3 Sulphur tornado.						
EF1	E of Tinker Air Force Base to Eastern Choctaw	Oklahoma	OK	35.413°N 97.358°W	02:45–02:56	8.5 mi (13.7 km)	150 yd (140 m)
EF1	This tornado damaged the roofs and siding of homes and a church, knocked down fences, damaged power poles, and snapped or uprooted trees.						
EFU	ENE of Lafontaine	Wilson	KS	37.42°N 95.81°W	02:50–02:51	0.01 mi (0.016 km)	10 yd (9.1 m)
EFU	A brief tornado was reported. No known damage occurred.						
EF1	NE of Happyland	Pontotoc	OK	34.804°N 96.519°W	03:15–03:17	1.5 mi (2.4 km)	30 yd (27 m)
EF1	An EF1 tornado damaged trees and outbuildings.						
EF1	SSE of Chandler to E of Kendrick	Lincoln	OK	35.653°N 96.843°W	03:16–03:29	10.35 mi (16.66 km)	250 yd (230 m)
EF1	Outbuildings were damaged or destroyed and trees were snapped or uprooted.						
EF3	Sulphur to WSW of Roff	Murray, Pontotoc	OK	34.474°N 96.992°W	03:23–03:37	9.91 mi (15.95 km)	440 yd (400 m)
EF3	1 death – See article on this tornado – Thirty others were injured.						
EF0	SW of Florence	Morgan	MO	38.55°N 93.04°W	03:29–03:36	3.51 mi (5.65 km)	50 yd (46 m)
EF0	Trees were uprooted along an intermittent path.						
EF3	Spaulding to W of Holdenville to SSW of Okemah	Hughes, Okfuskee	OK	35.001°N 96.442°W	03:36–04:15	27.98 mi (45.03 km)	1,760 yd (1,610 m)
EF3	2 deaths – See section on this tornado – Four people were injured.						
EF1	W of Roff to SSE of Vanoss	Pontotoc	OK	34.621°N 96.915°W	03:37–03:54	8.4 mi (13.5 km)	500 yd (460 m)
EF1	This EF1 tornado touched down as the Sulphur EF3 tornado was dissipating. Two mobile homes were rolled and destroyed, outbuildings and trees were damaged, and power poles were snapped.						
EF0	NNE of Ardmore	Carter	OK	34.212°N 97.1°W	03:45–03:46	0.5 mi (0.80 km)	30 yd (27 m)
EF0	A brief tornado downed a large tree branch in a field.						
EF1	ENE of Tipton to W of Clarksburg	Moniteau	MO	38.6687°N 92.7426°W	03:59–04:00	1.7 mi (2.7 km)	30 yd (27 m)
EF1	Structures and trees were damaged.						
EF1	SE of Lake of the Arbuckles to SSW of Scullin	Murray	OK	34.389°N 96.973°W	04:07–04:18	5.88 mi (9.46 km)	250 yd (230 m)
EF1	An automotive hardware facility suffered heavy damage to its warehouses with nearby outbuildings and homes suffering minor damage. Many trees were damaged along the path as well, including some trees that were snapped or uprooted.						
EF4	SW of Marietta to Dickson to Baum	Love, Carter	OK	33.915°N 97.144°W	04:08–04:33	26.85 mi (43.21 km)	900 yd (820 m)
EF4	1 death – See section on this tornado – Six people were injured.						
EF1	SE of Dougherty to Lake of the Arbuckles	Murray	OK	34.383°N 97.032°W	04:21–04:27	3.5 mi (5.6 km)	100 yd (91 m)
EF1	Tree damage occurred.						

=== April 28 event ===
List of confirmed tornadoes – Sunday, April 28, 2024
EF#	Location	County / Parish	State	Start Coord.	Time (UTC)	Path length	Max width
EF1	W of Schulter to N of Morris	Okmulgee	OK	35.5205°N 95.9962°W	05:01–05:14	11.3 mi (18.2 km)	1,400 yd (1,300 m)
EF1	This large, high-end EF1 tornado developed west of Schulter and widened as it moved northeastward, uprooting or snapping numerous trees. It then struck Morris, damaging numerous homes and businesses. The tornado then turned to the north of Morris and quickly dissipated.						
EF1	NE of Morris to NE of Pumpkin Center	Okmulgee	OK	35.6068°N 95.8408°W	05:14–05:23	8.9 mi (14.3 km)	1,100 yd (1,000 m)
EF1	Another large high-end EF1 tornado developed and moved northeastward as the first Morris tornado was dissipating. Numerous trees and power poles were snapped or uprooted, several homes were damaged, and several outbuildings were destroyed.						
EFU	W of Troy	Johnston	OK	34.314°N 96.897°W	05:22–05:25	1.1 mi (1.8 km)	200 yd (180 m)
EFU	A storm chaser and a local fire department observed a tornado. No damage was reported.						
EF1	W of Taft	Muskogee	OK	35.7068°N 95.6817°W	05:28–05:35	6.2 mi (10.0 km)	800 yd (730 m)
EF1	A tornado snapped large tree limbs and uprooted trees.						
EF1	ESE of Choska to NE of Porter	Wagoner	OK	35.8232°N 95.5798°W	05:37–05:55	9.8 mi (15.8 km)	750 yd (690 m)
EF1	The roof of a home was damaged, a small outbuilding was destroyed, and trees were uprooted and snapped by this high-end EF1 tornado.						
EF1	SW of Wagoner	Wagoner	OK	35.9329°N 95.4178°W	05:55–05:58	1.6 mi (2.6 km)	440 yd (400 m)
EF1	Several large trees were uprooted or snapped and power poles were damaged by this high-end EF1 tornado.						
EF1	NNE of Peggs	Cherokee	OK	36.1031°N 95.0927°W	06:23–06:30	4.3 mi (6.9 km)	350 yd (320 m)
EF1	Trees were snapped and uprooted.						
EF1	Manor	Travis	TX	30.3401°N 97.5841°W	13:31–13:41	4.82 mi (7.76 km)	20 yd (18 m)
EF1	This small tornado touched down west of Manor and moved generally eastward, causing minor roof damage to several businesses, knocking down a billboard into a gas station parking lot along US 290, and damaging trees. To the north of Manor, the tornado weakened or reformed further to the north and strengthened to high-end EF1 intensity causing significant roof damage to a home in a neighborhood. Other homes throughout both that neighborhood and an adjacent one also suffered significant shingle damage, fences were damaged, trampolines were tossed, and some trees were damaged. The tornado then dissipated to the northeast of Manor.						
EF0	Burlington	Milam	TX	31.0102°N 96.9941°W	19:50–19:51	0.19 mi (0.31 km)	40 yd (37 m)
EF0	Metal panels were peeled from a few uninhabited mobile homes.						
EF0	E of Groesbeck	Limestone	TX	31.5081°N 96.38°W	20:08–20:09	0.18 mi (0.29 km)	30 yd (27 m)
EF0	A tornado was filmed by a storm spotter which showed tree limbs being tossed.						
EF0	SW of Dew	Freestone	TX	31.5742°N 96.1746°W	20:35–20:37	1.25 mi (2.01 km)	90 yd (82 m)
EF0	The tornado uprooted several trees.						
EF0	Dew	Freestone	TX	31.5929°N 96.1399°W	20:47–20:49	0.91 mi (1.46 km)	50 yd (46 m)
EF0	A home sustained significant roof damage. Several trees were also damaged by the tornado.						
EFU	SSW of Crowder	Pittsburg	OK	35.0776°N 95.6831°W	22:23–22:26	2 mi (3.2 km)	100 yd (91 m)
EFU	A well-photographed tornado formed on land before moving onto Lake Eufaula before dissipating. No damage was noted.						
EF1	NNW of Bedias to SW of Madisonville	Grimes, Madison	TX	30.8151°N 95.9716°W	23:25–23:37	4.32 mi (6.95 km)	50 yd (46 m)
EF1	Large tree limbs were downed along with a few uprooted and snapped trees. Some roof and garage damage occurred to homes, too.						
EFU	NNW of Eufaula	McIntosh	OK	35.3359°N 95.5943°W	23:50–23:51	1.3 mi (2.1 km)	75 yd (69 m)
EFU	A brief waterspout was observed on Lake Eufaula before dissipating. No damage was noted.						
EF1	Southern Shreveport	Caddo	LA	32.4076°N 93.8311°W	00:07–00:09	3.19 mi (5.13 km)	350 yd (320 m)
EF1	This weak tornado uprooted trees and downed limbs, including some that fell on and damaged structures. The weight training facility building at a high school had most of its roof covering removed with the debris being blown hundreds of yards to the north. Most of the damage from the tornado was rated EF0; the EF1 rating was based on a snapped wooden power pole and a very small area of more concentrated tree damage.						
EF0	NW of Plain Dealing	Bossier	LA	32.9491°N 93.7833°W	00:25–00:30	2.88 mi (4.63 km)	350 yd (320 m)
EF0	This high-end EF0 tornado uprooted trees and snapped large tree limbs.						
EF1	NNW of Plain Dealing	Bossier	LA	32.9897°N 93.7473°W	00:32–00:36	3.05 mi (4.91 km)	325 yd (297 m)
EF1	This tornado uprooted trees and snapped large limbs along most of its path as it moved northeastward. It snapped trees at the end of its path, earning it an EF1 rating. The tornado may have continued northeastward beyond its estimated endpoint, but down trees inhibited survey teams from accessing areas further to the northeast.						
EF0	NE of Plain Dealing	Bossier	LA	32.9519°N 93.6488°W	00:33–00:35	1.68 mi (2.70 km)	275 yd (251 m)
EF0	This high-end EF0 tornado uprooted trees and snapped large tree limbs.						
EF1	SE of Trinity	Trinity	TX	30.9102°N 95.316°W	00:35–00:36	0.29 mi (0.47 km)	200 yd (180 m)
EF1	1 death – A brief EF1 tornado impacted a subdivision of Trinity. A mobile home was destroyed, injuring both of its occupants, one of which later died from his injuries. Widespread damage to trees and vehicles also occurred in the subdivision.						
EF1	SW of Bradley	Lafayette	AR	33.0496°N 93.7644°W	00:37–00:38	0.79 mi (1.27 km)	275 yd (251 m)
EF1	This high-end EF1 tornado snapped power poles and destroyed the majority of a metal barn containing hay bales. Trees were snapped or uprooted as well.						
EF1	ESE of Bradley	Lafayette	AR	33.07°N 93.6°W	00:43–00:44	1.37 mi (2.20 km)	150 yd (140 m)
EF1	This low-end EF1 tornado snapped or uprooted trees. It may have started further to the southwest than indicated, but downed trees prevented survey teams from investigating that area.						
EF0	ESE of Heavener	LeFlore	OK	34.8428°N 94.6142°W	01:01–01:10	4.3 mi (6.9 km)	200 yd (180 m)
EF0	A tornado was observed by storm chasers. The only damage found was snapped tree limbs.						
EF0	S of Union City	Stone	MO	36.9646°N 93.4721°W	01:20–01:22	0.41 mi (0.66 km)	100 yd (91 m)
EF0	Trees were uprooted and a small barn was damaged.						
EFU	NE of Osage to SW of Carrollton	Carroll	AR	36.2144°N 93.3665°W	03:15–03:19	2.1 mi (3.4 km)	75 yd (69 m)
EFU	A tornado was caught on a local news station tower camera. The tornado occurred in inaccessible, heavily wooded terrain so no damage could be surveyed.						

=== April 30 event ===
List of confirmed tornadoes – Tuesday, April 30, 2024
EF#	Location	County / Parish	State	Start Coord.	Time (UTC)	Path length	Max width
EFU	ESE of Burrton	Harvey	KS	38°N 97.6°W	21:30–21:45	0.01 mi (0.016 km)	10 yd (9.1 m)
EFU	Multiple pictures of a landspout were taken by trained spotters.						
EF3	Westmoreland	Pottawatomie	KS	39.3906°N 96.443°W	21:40–21:48	2.24 mi (3.60 km)	100 yd (91 m)
EF3	1 death – See article on this tornado – Three people were injured.						
EF1	SSW of Centralia	Nemaha	KS	39.6627°N 96.2041°W	22:02–22:16	3.19 mi (5.13 km)	75 yd (69 m)
EF1	A high-end EF1 tornado ripped part of the roof off of a home, snapped wooden power poles, and damaged trees.						
EF1	New Cordell	Washita	OK	35.276°N 98.99°W	22:32–22:39	2.53 mi (4.07 km)	200 yd (180 m)
EF1	A high-end EF1 tornado struck southern and east portions of New Cordell, damaging numerous homes and businesses.						
EFU	S of Emmett	Pottawatomie	KS	39.25°N 96.04°W	22:36–22:37	0.25 mi (0.40 km)	20 yd (18 m)
EFU	A storm chaser took a photo of a rope tornado.						
EFU	NNW of Augusta	Butler	KS	37.7234°N 96.993°W	23:23–23:25	0.01 mi (0.016 km)	10 yd (9.1 m)
EFU	A brief tornado touched down. No damage occurred.						
EFU	NW of Grantville	Shawnee	KS	39.129°N 95.641°W	23:34–22:35	0.11 mi (0.18 km)	25 yd (23 m)
EFU	Storm chasers filmed a funnel almost fully condensed over an open field.						
EF1	SE of Perry to Williamstown	Jefferson	KS	39.0594°N 95.3663°W	23:57–00:03	2.15 mi (3.46 km)	75 yd (69 m)
EF1	A high-end EF1 tornado damaged a small farm before striking Williamstown, damaging two homes and snapping or uprooting trees.						
EF0	E of Millerton	Wayne	IA	40.828°N 93.2889°W	00:12–00:16	2.95 mi (4.75 km)	50 yd (46 m)
EF0	A high-end EF0 impacted a large implement shed and an older wooden barn. The shed was destroyed and the barn collapsed. Some trees were downed and minor outbuilding damage also occurred.						
EFU	ESE of Tipton	Tillman	OK	34.4779°N 99.0751°W	00:25–00:39	2.4 mi (3.9 km)	50 yd (46 m)
EFU	A tornado was reported by a storm chaser.						
EF0	SSE of Cooperton	Kiowa	OK	34.8299°N 98.8498°W	00:35	0.5 mi (0.80 km)	100 yd (91 m)
EF0	A landspout-type tornado was observed by storm spotters and storm chasers. No damage was observed.						
EF0	NW of Sedan	Chautauqua	KS	37.1641°N 96.2307°W	01:32–01:35	0.07 mi (0.11 km)	15 yd (14 m)
EF0	A couple of trees were snapped and some branches were broken.						
EF1	NE of Hollister	Tillman	OK	34.362°N 98.832°W	02:32–03:12	6.4 mi (10.3 km)	1,200 yd (1,100 m)
EF1	This large, slow-moving tornado moved through rural areas producing power pole, tree, and outbuilding damage. The tornado hit two farmsteads after turning northeast before turning northwest and dissipating. According to the survey by the NWS office in Norman, Oklahoma, the tornado produced EF1 damage but "may have been much stronger".						
EF1	SSE of Loveland to WNW of Grandfield	Tillman	OK	34.274°N 98.75°W	03:18–03:32	2.15 mi (3.46 km)	200 yd (180 m)
EF1	An anticyclonic tornado damaged some trees. The NWS office in Norman states that this tornado was "likely stronger than the observed damage" in their survey.						

== See also ==
- Tornadoes of 2024
- List of United States tornadoes from January to March 2024
- List of United States tornadoes in May 2024
