= Wallace, West Virginia =

Wallace, West Virginia may refer to:

- Wallace, Harrison County, West Virginia, an unincorporated community in Harrison County
- Wallace, Kanawha County, West Virginia, an unincorporated community in Kanawha County
