= Nisbet Inn =

Coordinates: 38.1463°N 87.6534°W

The Nisbet Inn is an historic tavern in Vanderburgh County, Indiana. Built in 1912 by George Maurer, it got its name from a crew supervisor who built several nearby landmarks. For a time, the inn served as the administrative center of Armstrong Township, Vanderburgh County, Indiana.

== Reviews ==
In a 1992 review, Linda Negro for the Evansville Courier and Press gave the menu five out of seven stars, and commended the server's attentive service and the quality of food. A later review by the same author in 2010 highlighted the BierKaese, a cheese dish with an foul odor.
