= Benedict, Kansas =

City in Wilson County, Kansas

- City
- Location within Wilson County and Kansas

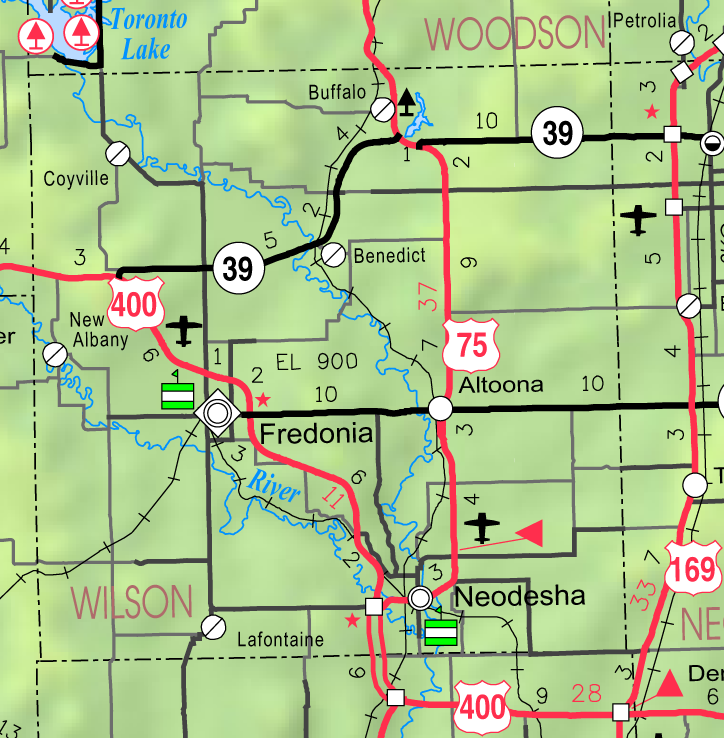
- KDOT map of Wilson County (legend)
- Coordinates: 37°37′37″N 95°44′37″W
- Country: United States
- State: Kansas
- County: Wilson
- Founded: 1866
- Incorporated: 1905
- Named for: S.S. Benedict

Area
  - Total: 0.15 sq mi (0.38 km^{2})
  - Land: 0.15 sq mi (0.38 km^{2})
  - Water: 0 sq mi (0.00 km^{2})
- Elevation: 853 ft (260 m)

Population (2020)
  - Total: 69
  - Density: 470/sq mi (180/km^{2})
- Time zone: UTC-6 (CST)
  - Summer (DST): UTC-5 (CDT)
- ZIP Code: 66714
- Area code: 620
- FIPS code: 20-06000
- GNIS ID: 474918

Benedict is a city in Wilson County, Kansas, United States, along the Verdigris River. As of the 2020 census, the population of the city was 69.

== History ==
Benedict had its start in the year 1866 by the building of the railroad through that territory. Benedict was laid out at the junction of the Atchison, Topeka and Santa Fe Railway and the Missouri Pacific Railroad. It was named for S. S. Benedict.

== Geography ==
Benedict is located at 37°37′37″N 95°44′37″W (37.627014, -95.743500). According to the United States Census Bureau, the city has a total area of 0.15 square miles (0.39 km^{2}), all land.

=== Climate ===
The climate in this area is characterized by hot, humid summers and generally mild to cool winters. According to the Köppen Climate Classification system, Benedict has a humid subtropical climate, abbreviated "Cfa" on climate maps.

== Demographics ==
Historical population
Census	Pop.	Note	%±
1910	215		—
1920	275		27.9%
1930	223		−18.9%
1940	213		−4.5%
1950	176		−17.4%
1960	128		−27.3%
1970	91		−28.9%
1980	111		22.0%
1990	16		−85.6%
2000	103		543.8%
2010	73		−29.1%
2020	69		−5.5%
U.S. Decennial Census

=== 2020 census ===
The 2020 United States census counted 69 people, 33 households, and 19 families in Benedict. The population density was 472.6 per square mile (182.5/km^{2}). There were 40 housing units at an average density of 274.0 per square mile (105.8/km^{2}). The racial makeup was 82.61% (57) white or European American (82.61% non-Hispanic white), 0.0% (0) black or African-American, 2.9% (2) Native American or Alaska Native, 0.0% (0) Asian, 0.0% (0) Pacific Islander or Native Hawaiian, 0.0% (0) from other races, and 14.49% (10) from two or more races. Hispanic or Latino of any race was 0.0% (0) of the population.

Of the 33 households, 30.3% had children under the age of 18; 45.5% were married couples living together; 36.4% had a female householder with no spouse or partner present. 36.4% of households consisted of individuals and 21.2% had someone living alone who was 65 years of age or older. The average household size was 2.3 and the average family size was 2.9. The percent of those with a bachelor's degree or higher was estimated to be 1.4% of the population.

10.1% of the population was under the age of 18, 7.2% from 18 to 24, 29.0% from 25 to 44, 26.1% from 45 to 64, and 27.5% who were 65 years of age or older. The median age was 48.3 years. For every 100 females, there were 109.1 males. For every 100 females ages 18 and older, there were 100.0 males.

The 2016–2020 5-year American Community Survey estimates show that the median household income was $38,500 (with a margin of error of +/- $8,149) and the median family income was $38,375 (+/- $7,549). The median income for those above 16 years old was $31,429 (+/- $17,645). Approximately, 0.0% of families and 10.9% of the population were below the poverty line, including 0.0% of those under the age of 18 and 10.7% of those ages 65 or over.

=== 2010 census ===
As of the census of 2010, there were 73 people, 34 households, and 19 families residing in the city. The population density was 486.7 inhabitants per square mile (187.9/km^{2}). There were 46 housing units at an average density of 306.7 per square mile (118.4/km^{2}). The racial makeup of the city was 89.0% White, 2.7% Native American, 4.1% from other races, and 4.1% from two or more races. Hispanic or Latino of any race were 4.1% of the population.

There were 34 households, of which 14.7% had children under the age of 18 living with them, 44.1% were married couples living together, 5.9% had a female householder with no husband present, 5.9% had a male householder with no wife present, and 44.1% were non-families. 29.4% of all households were made up of individuals, and 20.6% had someone living alone who was 65 years of age or older. The average household size was 2.15 and the average family size was 2.74.

The median age in the city was 54.8 years. 13.7% of residents were under the age of 18; 5.4% were between the ages of 18 and 24; 19.1% were from 25 to 44; 26% were from 45 to 64; and 35.6% were 65 years of age or older. The gender makeup of the city was 50.7% male and 49.3% female.

=== 2000 census ===
As of the census of 2000, there were 103 people, 46 households, and 23 families residing in the city. The population density was 700.8 inhabitants per square mile (270.6/km^{2}). There were 52 housing units at an average density of 353.8 per square mile (136.6/km^{2}). The racial makeup of the city was 97.09% White and 2.91% Native American.

There were 46 households, out of which 23.9% had children under the age of 18 living with them, 45.7% were married couples living together, 4.3% had a female householder with no husband present, and 50.0% were non-families. 45.7% of all households were made up of individuals, and 21.7% had someone living alone who was 65 years of age or older. The average household size was 2.24 and the average family size was 3.39.

In the city, the population was spread out, with 29.1% under the age of 18, 3.9% from 18 to 24, 19.4% from 25 to 44, 31.1% from 45 to 64, and 16.5% who were 65 years of age or older. The median age was 44 years. For every 100 females, there were 94.3 males. For every 100 females age 18 and over, there were 97.3 males.

The median income for a household in the city was $20,625, and the median income for a family was $30,625. Males had a median income of $35,625 versus $16,250 for females. The per capita income for the city was $11,842. There were 19.0% of families and 27.1% of the population living below the poverty line, including 33.3% of under eighteens and 26.3% of those over 64.

== Education ==
Benedict is served by USD 484 Fredonia.

Benedict High School was closed through school unification. The Benedict High School mascot was Bulldogs.
