= Gainesville, Mississippi =

- Ghost town
- Location within Mississippi
- Coordinates: 30°21′04″N 89°38′23″W
- Country: United States
- State: Mississippi
- County: Hancock
- Time zone: UTC-6 (Central (CST))
  - Summer (DST): UTC-5 (CDT)

Gainesville is a ghost town located in Hancock County, Mississippi, near the border of Louisiana.

Formerly a thriving port on the Pearl River, the town underwent marked decline due to the emergence of railways in the mid-19th century. They shifted freight and travel away from rivers, resulting in the abandonment of some port towns.

The land was acquired by NASA in 1962. It was developed as the Stennis Space Center.

== Early history ==
The land where Gainesville would be founded was part of the Piney Woods region. Native Americans used the timber from an abundance of longleaf pines to make wooden structures and canoes. They carved the latter with their tools.

Such tall standing and sturdy trees drew the attention of early European explorers to the area as a source for ship masts.

The earliest recorded European settlement of the area was circa 1790. It developed as a port for cotton shipments headed downstream to New Orleans. This first settlement was known as "Cottonport." Documents indicate that, in later years, the settlement was also known as "English Bluff." Later in the 19th century, timber was also shipped downriver from here.

== Town of Gainesville ==
In 1810, an official Spanish land grant of approximately 500 acres was acquired by Dr. Ambrose Gaines, who immodestly named the settlement "Gainesville."

In 1813, during the War of 1812, General Andrew Jackson marched his forces through Gainesville shortly before the Battle of New Orleans.

The Pearl River Lumber company was founded in Gainesville in 1832, and became the largest lumber company in the South at the time. It helped to establish Gainesville as one of the most prosperous pre-Civil War settlements in Mississippi.

The town of Gainesville was officially incorporated in 1843, and served as the seat of Hancock County for nearly a decade, until the courthouse burned. A post office operated under the name Gainesville from 1844 to 1918.

The Gainesville Volunteers were organized in 1860 and made up Company G of the 3rd Mississippi Infantry of the Confederate States Army, serving at Vicksburg and Atlanta during the Civil War.

In 1900, Gainesville had a population of 227 and was home to two churches and several stores.

== Decline ==
Gainesville began to suffer decline in the latter half of the 19th century, due largely to the emergence of railroads as a means for timber transportation. When a major rail-line bypassed the town by ten miles, residents began to leave the area in search of better jobs.

== NASA ==
In 1961, NASA first began considering the area for a research and development center. This later was developed as the Stennis Space Center. Several of Gainesville's abandoned buildings were used by NASA in the early days after it acquired the area.

== Legacy ==
The rise and fall of Gainesville is remembered as one of the more dramatic examples of post-Civil War/Industrial Revolution effects in Mississippi. The story of Gainesville's decline is one shared by many communities and towns at the time, which underwent rapid population shifts after a growing railroad industry bypassed once thriving settlements.

At its peak, Gainesville boasted a courthouse and numerous homes and other structures of historical significance. According to NASA's Cultural Resources Center, other elements of the town were described as:

"...a hotel called the Gainesville Exchange, a track for horse racing, one or more coffee houses, two barrooms, two drug stores, a Masonic Lodge, shops, stables, brick factories, a telegraph office, dry dock facilities, a steamboat landing, stores for distilling turpentine and other resinous products, and, of course, saw mills."

As late as 1962, many of these historic buildings remained. NASA used some of them for various purposes, including the Rouchon House, an old fishing lodge. NASA held the first flag-raising ceremony here.

In the early 21st century, however, almost none of the town's original structures remains. (See below section for exceptions). A pictorial history of old photographs is maintained on NASA's website.

=== Reinterment ===
Following NASA's acquisition of the properties in 1961-1962, a total of 483 existing graves were reinterred to make way for new construction. Of these, 306 were relocated from the Baptist Church (white) Cemetery; 177 from the Colored Cemetery. A total of 224 graves were unmarked. A record of the names and reinterment is maintained by the Hancock County Historical Society.

=== Wisteria vine ===
A 1963 article in the Picayune Item newspaper reported NASA's effort to protect a (at the time) "75-year-old Wistaria (sic) Vine" located near the Rouchon House. Protection efforts included the erection of a fence and plaque marking the significance of the vine. The article reported "some old timers believe {the vine} may be the largest in the world" and described it as "a foot thick and it has spread all over the ground and an adjacent cedar tree sixty of seventy feet tall."
