= Clarkville, Colorado =

Unincorporated community in Colorado, US

- unincorporated community
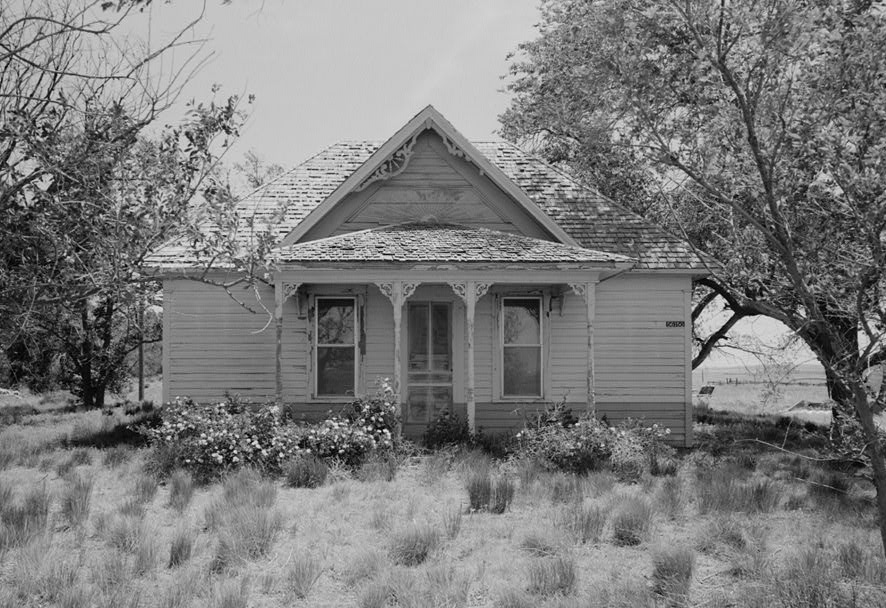
- Felderman Farm in Clarkville (1992)

- Location of Clarkville, Colorado. Clarkville (Colorado)
- Coordinates: 40°23′42″N 102°37′34″W
- Country: United States
- State: Colorado
- County: Yuma
- Founded: 1938

Government
  - Type: unincorporated community
  - Body: Yuma County
- Elevation: 4,016 ft (1,224 m)
- Time zone: UTC−07:00 (MST)
  - Summer (DST): UTC−06:00 (MDT)
- ZIP code: Haxtun 80731
- Area codes: 970/748
- GNIS place ID: 182886

Clarkville is an unincorporated community in northern Yuma County, Colorado, United States. It is located at an intersection where Colorado State Highway 59 curves from east–west to north–south.

== History ==
The town was first populated in 1933, and several of its structures were moved to the town over the years, including at least two homes and the schoolhouse, the latter of which arrived from nearby Haxtun in 1940. The Clarkville post office operated from May 18, 1938, until April 30, 1954. The town derived its name from businessman Ted Clark and his family in the area. The town was depopulated after its sale in 1947.

The town was photographed by Robert Adams in 1972, and some of the work is displayed by the Yale University Art Gallery.

== See also ==
- List of populated places in Colorado
