= Centerview, Oklahoma =

Populated place in Oklahoma, US

Coordinates: 35°26′01″N 96°39′55″W

Centerview is a populated place in Pottawatomie County, Oklahoma, at an elevation of 988 feet. It is located 4 miles south-southeast of Prague, Oklahoma, on US Route 377 at Moccasin Trail.

The 1936 WPA-constructed Centerview School still exists and has had an Oklahoma Landmarks Inventory Nomination.
