= Lodge, Virginia =

Unincorporated community in Virginia, US

Coordinates: 37°59′31″N 76°32′35″W

Lodge is an unincorporated community in Northumberland County, in the U.S. state of Virginia.
