= Wallace, Kanawha County, West Virginia =

Wallace, West Virginia
- Unincorporated community
- Location within West Virginia Location within the United States
- Coordinates: 38°27′32″N 81°39′42″W
- Country: United States
- State: West Virginia
- County: Kanawha
- Elevation: 682 ft (208 m)
- Time zone: UTC-5 (Eastern (EST))
  - Summer (DST): UTC-4 (EDT)
- Area codes: 304 & 681
- GNIS feature ID: 1742014

Wallace is an unincorporated community in Kanawha County, West Virginia, United States. Wallace is 7 miles (11 km) north of Charleston.

The community most likely was named after a local oil and gas official.
