= Dover Bluff, Georgia =

Unincorporated community in Georgia, U.S.

Dover Bluff
- Unincorporated community
- Location in the State of Georgia
- Coordinates: 31°01′02″N 81°31′37″W
- Country: United States
- State: Georgia
- County: Camden

Population
  - Total: 2,409 (ZCTA 31,565)
- ZIP Code: 31565
- Area code: 912

Dover Bluff is an unincorporated community in Camden County, Georgia, United States. It is located in the northeastern section of the county along the coastal marshlands and forms part of the Brunswick Metropolitan Statistical Area. The community shares its ZIP Code (31565) with nearby Waverly.

== History ==
The community most likely took its name from the White Cliffs of Dover in England.

The Dover Bluff region possesses an extensive history of human habitation dating back centuries. Archaeological records and early 19th-century accounts document the existence of pre-contact Native American shell rings and mounds near Sparkman Creek and Lampadocia. The area also contains historic tabby structures; while 20th-century topographic maps originally mislabeled these ruins as an "Old Spanish Mission," they were later identified by historians as 19th-century plantation slave cabins.

In the modern era, local land management and environmental stewardship have been heavily led by the Dover Bluff Club, a private hunting, fishing, and conservation reservation established in the area.

== Geography and Ecology ==
Dover Bluff is a coastal waterfront community situated on the banks of Dover Creek and Umbrella Creek, which feed into the larger Satilla River estuary system.

=== Noyes Cut Ecosystem Restoration ===
The aquatic ecosystem surrounding Dover Bluff was heavily impacted by 20th-century industrial modifications. In 1932 and 1933, the United States Army Corps of Engineers (USACE) dug an artificial navigation channel known as "Noyes Cut" through the salt marshes to facilitate the transport of logs by barge. Over the following decades, the non-maintained cut severely disrupted local hydrology. It altered tidal exchange patterns, reversed natural water flows, accelerated channel sedimentation, and obliterated the gradual salinity gradients necessary for native marine life. Landowners from the Dover Bluff Club first documented the resultant decline in water quality and severe shoaling in 1935 and spent over forty years advocating for environmental remediation.

Following multi-agency collaboration and scientific assessments by local universities, the USACE launched the Noyes Cut Ecosystem Restoration Project. Funded via a $3.1 million contract from the Bipartisan Infrastructure Law, the project successfully closed the disruptive man-made cuts (including Dynamite Cut and Old River Run) using thousands of tons of riprap. Completed with a ribbon-cutting ceremony in March 2023, the restoration successfully redirected the Satilla River to its natural course to recover historic salinity regimes and fish spawning habitats for native species like white shrimp, eastern oysters, blue crabs, and striped bass.

== Transportation ==
The community is primarily accessed via Dover Bluff Road, a rural corridor that connects the coastal settlement to U.S. Route 17. In late 2022, the Camden County Public Works Department executed a temporary closure and detour of the road to upgrade its infrastructure, executing cross-pipe replacements and repaving projects.

== Demographics ==
Because Dover Bluff is unincorporated, the United States Census Bureau does not track its population statistics independently; instead, demographic metrics are compiled via the 31565 Zip Code Tabulation Area (ZCTA), which encompasses Waverly and surrounding rural communities. According to census estimates, the ZCTA has a population of 2,409 residents with a median age of 47 years and a gender distribution of 51.4% female.

The racial makeup of the community is outlined below:

Race / Ethnicity	Percentage
White	84.1%
Other / Multiracial / Black	15.9%

== Education ==
Public education for Dover Bluff residents is provided by the Camden County School District. Students residing in the area are primarily zoned to Woodbine Elementary School for grades K–5, before moving on to Camden Middle School and Camden County High School.
