= Hopewell, Camden County, Georgia =

Unincorporated community in Camden County, Georgia, US

Hopewell
- Unincorporated community
- Location within the State of Georgia
- Coordinates: 30°58′48″N 81°45′00″W
- Country: United States
- State: Georgia
- County: Camden
- Elevation: 13 ft (4 m)
- Time zone: UTC−5 (EST)
  - Summer (DST): UTC−4 (EDT)
- ZIP code: 31568
- Area code: 912

Hopewell, often referred to in modern legal property tracts as Hopewell Point, is an unincorporated community situated along the Satilla River in northern Camden County, Georgia, United States. The community is officially classified by county authorities as a distinct populated settlement within Unincorporated Service District 43.

== Geography ==
Hopewell is located on the southern bank of the Satilla River tidal basin, positioned on a low-lying peninsula northwest of the city of Woodbine. The local landscape features an average elevation of 13 feet (4 m) above sea level, consisting primarily of maritime forest ecosystems dominated by mature live oak canopies.

The community's primary transportation and logistical access is provided by Hopewell Point Road, a paved collector street that interfaces with Georgia State Route 110 and runs roughly 8 minutes east of Interstate 95. The area uses the 31568 ZIP code, anchored by the neighboring community of White Oak.

== Governance and infrastructure ==
As an unincorporated area, Hopewell has no independent municipal structure, charter, or local officials. Local governance and zoning policies are overseen by the Camden County Board of Commissioners. Structural development within the community is bound by the county's R-2 residential district regulations, which restrict land use to single-family site-built and modular housing units. Municipal infrastructure relies on private residential septic setups and a shared neighborhood well system rather than centralized county water networks.

== Education ==
Public education for residents of Hopewell is administered by the Camden County School District. The community is explicitly zoned into public facilities located in nearby Woodbine and Kingsland, including Woodbine Elementary School for primary grades, Camden Middle School, and Camden County High School.
