= Jefferson, Camden County, Georgia =

Unincorporated community and ghost town in Georgia, U.S.

Jefferson Jeffersonton
- Unincorporated community and ghost town
- Jefferson, Georgia
- Location of Jefferson in the State of Georgia
- Coordinates: 30°58′00″N 81°47′24″W
- Country: United States
- State: Georgia
- County: Camden County
- Platted: 1800
- Abandoned as seat: 1871
- Time zone: UTC−5 (EST)
  - Summer (DST): UTC−4 (EDT)
- Area code: 912
- GNIS ID: 332093

Jefferson, historically alternatively known as Jeffersonton, is an unincorporated community and ghost town located along the Satilla River in western Camden County, in the U.S. state of Georgia.

Established at the turn of the 19th century, the settlement served as the first permanent county seat of Camden County for nearly 70 years. Following the economic disruption of the American Civil War and the structural collapse of the regional plantation complex, the town rapidly depopulated and was eventually abandoned.

== Geography ==
Jefferson is situated on the south bank of the Satilla River, positioned in the low-lying, rural western interior of Camden County. It lies northwest of the historic Antrim plantation tract. The local terrain is characterized by coastal flatwoods and wetlands, which historically subjected the settlement to poor drainage and seasonal moisture.

== History ==
=== Founding and prominence (1800–1860) ===
Jefferson was formally platted in 1800. By an Act of the Georgia General Assembly passed on November 29, 1800, the town was designated as Camden County's first permanent seat of government, succeeding a temporary site at St. Marys. The inland location was favored by county planners because it placed the local judiciary and administrative offices closer to wealthy interior and riverfront rice and long-staple sea island cotton planters who wielded immense political and economic influence in the region.

In 1802, a permanent courthouse and "gaol" (jail) were erected in the town, which came to be known interchangeably as Jeffersonton. The courthouse was a rustic, two-story timber frame structure designed with a primary courtroom on the ground level and a dedicated grand jury room on the second floor. Throughout the antebellum era, Jeffersonton flourished as a vital regional trading post, social hub, and legal checkpoint for the surrounding plantation economy.

=== Decline and abandonment (1861–1871) ===
The onset of the Civil War and the subsequent Reconstruction era catalyzed the rapid dissolution of the community. The abolition of slavery collapsed the labor-intensive tidal rice operations along the Satilla River that formed Jeffersonton's primary economic backbone. Many prominent landowning families permanently vacated their estates, leaving behind a heavily diminished local tax base.

Compounding its structural financial decline, the low-lying geography presented recurring epidemiological hazards. Swamped by seasonal moisture and inadequate drainage, the remaining local population was repeatedly exposed to disease outbreaks, causing county authorities to declare the environment inherently malarial.

Recognizing the town's terminal decline, the Georgia Legislature passed an act on October 27, 1870, authorizing an election to determine the relocation of the local government. On January 3, 1871, a county-wide vote formally stripped Jefferson of its status and returned the county seat to the growing coastal port city of St. Marys. Following the removal of the county records and judicial apparatus, Jeffersonton depopulated rapidly. By the early 20th century, the historic core had entirely faded from the landscape, leaving only archaeological remains.

== Transportation ==
Jefferson's early development and ultimate layout were entirely dictated by its positioning relative to regional water and land transport infrastructure.

The community's riverfront location on the south bank of the navigable Satilla River was originally selected to provide centralized shipping and barge access for inland agricultural trade, allowing plantations to export cash crops directly to coastal markets.

In 1805, U.S. Treasurer Albert Gallatin explicitly designated the overland postal route running from St. Marys straight through Jeffersonton to the early state capital of Milledgeville—known as the Old Post Road—as one of seven principal routes critical to national military defense and United States postal communication. Following the town's abandonment, portions of this network evolved into modern local thoroughfares, preserved in regional geography via place names like the Old Jefferson Highway.
