= Thiokol-Woodbine explosion =

Chemical plant explosion

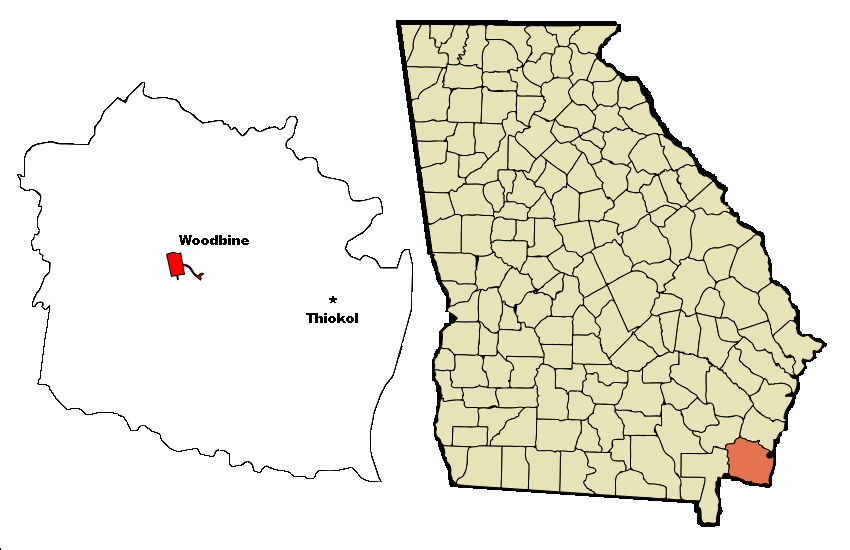
- Location of Thiokol plant and Woodbine in Camden County, Georgia
- Date: Wednesday, February 3, 1971
- Time: 10:53 UTC-5
- Location: Woodbine, Georgia, United States 30.9241°N 81.5152°W
- Deaths: 29
- Injuries: 50

The Thiokol-Woodbine explosion occurred at 10:53 a.m. EDT on Wednesday, February 3, 1971, at the Thiokol chemical plant, 12 miles (19 km) southeast of Woodbine, Georgia, and 30 miles (48 km) north of Jacksonville, Florida, when large quantities of flares and their components in building M-132 were ignited by a fire and detonation occurred. A total of 29 workers died.

== Background ==
=== Plant history ===
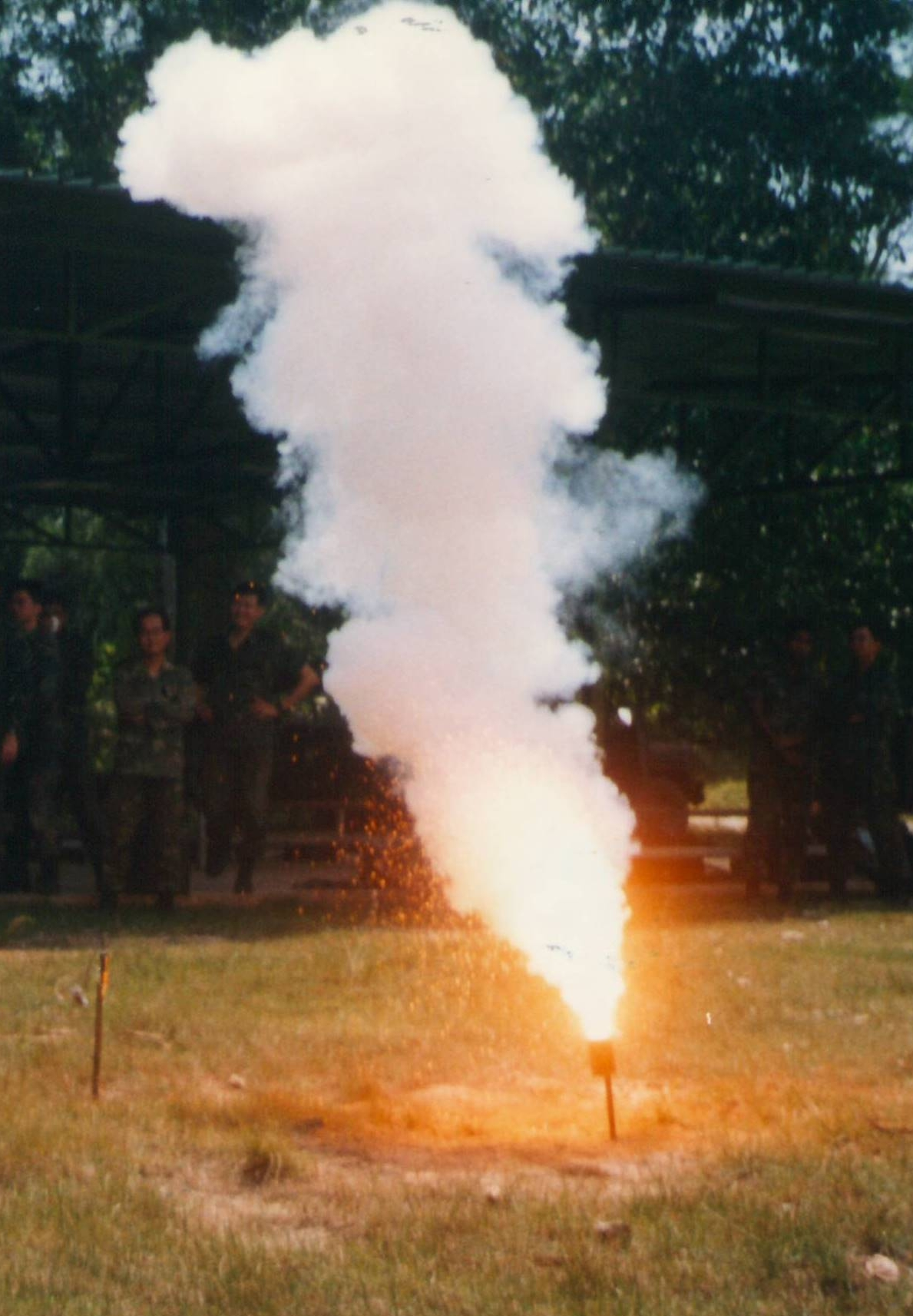
Tripflare igniting

Thiokol Chemical at Woodbine was a complex of 36 buildings located on 7,400 acres (29.95 km^{2}; 11.56 sq mi) of land at the former Floyd Plantation, constructed in 1964 to test and build solid propellant rocket motors for NASA. However, the space agency changed plans and decided to use liquid fuel, therefore, Thiokol modified the installation to manufacture other products. In 1969, the company was awarded an Army contract to manufacture 750,000 tripflares for use in the Vietnam War.

=== Hazard ===
Magnesium is the primary component in flares; shavings/ribbons can ignite at 950 °F (510 °C), and the element generates bright white light when it burns at a temperature of approximately 2,500 °F (1,370 °C). It cannot be extinguished by normal methods; water combines with magnesium to release hydrogen gas, which also burns; carbon dioxide (CO_{2}) is not effective, either.

Unconfined magnesium burns through deflagration (flames), which is controlled combustion propagated through thermal conductivity. However, in a confined space, heat and pressure build up, causing detonation (explosion), which is uncontrolled and propagates through shock wave compression.

Prior to 1967, the components of tripflares were classified as class 7 hazardous material, a category reserved for the most dangerous substances except biological and nuclear. During that year, for reasons unknown, flares were downgraded to Class 2 (fire hazard). Three years later, the Army realized their mistake and issued an order on October 29, 1970 to return the flares and components to Class 7. Through a communications error, Thiokol-Woodbine did not receive the information until three weeks after the disaster.

=== Production ===
M-132 was a large, windowless, concrete block building shaped like a "T". Three processes were used in flare manufacturing, all located within the structure. Approximately 80 employees worked there, predominantly women.

- 50 pounds of chemicals were mixed to create a pyrotechnic compound; screened, ground, and "cured", then formed into ignition pellets, which readily combust and generate the temperatures required to ignite the illuminant pellets.
- 500 pounds of sodium nitrate and magnesium with a chemical binder were mixed, granulated, and "cured" at 1,100 °F (593 °C), then pressed into illuminant pellets, which produce bright white light when burned.
- 3 illuminant pellets and 1 ignition pellet were inserted into a metal flare case, and the device was covered and closed.

Additionally, completed flares were kept in the building until they were transferred to a warehouse for shipment to one of three arsenals.

== Explosion and fire ==
A fire originated at the work station where an ignition chemical was manually added to other chemicals prior to forming ignition pellets. Small fires occurred occasionally, but they had always been quickly extinguished, so there was no panic. This one was different; it jumped to the material on the conveyor belt and spread up and down the production line, setting fire to ignition and illuminant pellets stored in containers near the line before reaching the "cure" room and a storage room, which contained nearly five tons of processed material, pellets, and 56,322 assembled flares.

During the 3–4 minutes after the fire began, all the workers were able to exit the building, but did not leave the area because they were unaware of a potential explosion. The survivors recalled two minor concussions before the enormous explosion when the contents of the "cure" and storage rooms detonated, followed by a huge fireball.

A supervisor in another building 300 yards away heard the fire alarm and walked outside. He had served in Vietnam, but said the explosion was worse than anything encountered in his war experience: "I watched B-52s drop 500-pound bombs. This is the biggest explosion I ever saw and I saw some pretty good-sized ones. When it blew, the explosion kept rolling out, rolling out. We sat there and watched the ball of fire coming toward us."

The explosion and fire each killed, dismembered or injured dozens of employees. Bodies were hurled 400 feet and debris was found 4,200 feet (1,300 m) from building M-132, which was leveled. Three other nearby buildings were severely damaged, and the fire engulfed nearby pine trees, which started a forest fire that eventually scorched 200 acres (0.81 km^{2}). Windows were shattered 11 miles (18 km) from the site and the explosion was heard for 50 miles (80 km) around.

Twenty-four people were killed in the blast or died soon after. Five others later died from their injuries, primarily burns, for a total of 29 deaths, predominantly Black women. At least 50 individuals suffered debilitating injuries, including burns and limbs severed by the explosion.

== Response ==
=== Local ===
In 1971, the only emergency capability in Camden County was the 25-man volunteer fire department in Kingsland, 12 miles (19 km) southwest of the plant. Their fire chief felt the ground shake from the explosion.

The Sheriff's department dispatcher directed him to Thiokol, and a towering smoke plume could be seen for miles. He immediately requested ambulances and equipment from surrounding counties, including Nassau and Duval in Florida, but had no idea how bad the situation really was. Chemicals in barrels were still exploding when he arrived, and he commented, "It was just devastation. People who were killed were lying everywhere. There were woods burning all around us." The area was quickly evacuated because another building, with the same contents as the exploded building, was on fire.

Co-workers and residents took most of those with non-life-threatening injuries to hospitals in their cars and pickups, while the severely injured were brought to the plant entrance where arriving ambulances rushed them for treatment to hospitals in St. Marys, Folkston, Brunswick and Jacksonville.

Thiokol had a landing strip on their property, used by company executives who lived on St. Simons Island. All available pilots were requested to fly to the company airstrip to transport the injured to hospitals, the closest being in Brunswick.

It was late afternoon before the last fire was extinguished, the last injured were transported to hospitals, and the search for bodies was completed.

=== Georgia ===
The Georgia Division of Forestry was notified, and workers arrived with bulldozers and plowed a firebreak to contain the forest fire.

Governor Jimmy Carter, who took office three weeks before the tragedy, flew by helicopter to the scene. Carter was told by J.B. Galloway, the plant's manager, that a building fire caused the blast, but the material being processed was not normally explosive. Galloway stated, "It's a puzzle to us and news that it would even explode."

=== Federal ===
To assist in the rescue effort, the U.S. Navy sent four helicopters from NAS Cecil Field and NAS Jacksonville to fly the most critically injured victims from the Thiol plant to Duval Medical Center (now UF Health Jacksonville).

The United States Army dispatched investigative teams to determine what caused the explosion. The Federal Bureau of Investigation provided expertise to help identify the bodies.

== Subsequent ==
=== Investigation ===
Thiokol and the Bureau of Alcohol, Tobacco, Firearms and Explosives each performed an investigation, and their reports were very similar. They both agreed on three causes:

1. The flare components, identified as a class 2 hazard, had inherent explosive potential and should have been class 7
2. Material in the production building was stored all along the production line, creating a fuse leading to the cure room
3. The building's internal fire protection system was inadequate

=== Litigation ===
Initially, lawsuits were filed against Thiokol Chemical and the United States jointly, but Georgia law prevented employees from suing their employer because they were covered by workers' compensation insurance.

A total of 25 cases seeking damages of $717,526,391 were filed in Federal Court against the United States under the Federal Tort Claims Act. The suits claimed negligence by Army procurement employees for not notifying Thiokol when the flares and their components were reclassified from a Class 2 "fire hazard" to Class 7 "explosive". The court found this to be a proximate cause of the explosion and granted final judgment for the plaintiffs. The U.S. Army (as defendant) appealed the verdict to the Fifth Circuit of the United States Court of Appeals. The case was expedited and the lower court's judgment was affirmed, 2-1 on October 15, 1979. However, that was not the end of litigation. The victims had to wait another 9 years before they actually received compensation.

=== Monument ===
A granite marker, the size of a full-size bed, was placed near the entrance of the property. The names of those killed in the tragedy are carved into the polished surface. Thiokol never resumed production of tripflares, but continued making other munitions until the end of the Vietnam War. In 1976, the complex was sold to Union Carbide.

=== Memorial ===
The Thiokol Memorial Museum was established in 2017 to preserve the history of the Thiokol Chemical Plant that operated from 1960 to 1977, including the 1971 explosion.
