= St. Marys Airport =

- IATA: none; ICAO: none; FAA LID: 4J6

Summary
- Airport type: Public
- Owner: St. Mary's Airport Authority
- Serves: St. Marys, Georgia
- Elevation AMSL: 23 ft / 7 m
- Coordinates: 30°45′12″N 081°33′30″W
- Interactive map of St. Marys Airport

Runways
Direction	Length		Surface
Direction	ft	m	Surface
4/22	5,021	1,530	Asphalt
13/31	4,000	1,219	Asphalt

Statistics (2011)
- Aircraft operations: 4,000
- Based aircraft: 29
- Source: Federal Aviation Administration

St. Marys Airport (FAA LID: 4J6) was a public use airport located two nautical miles (2.3 mi, 3.7 km) north of the central business district of St. Marys, a city in Camden County, Georgia, United States. It is owned by the St. Mary's Airport Authority.

== Facilities and aircraft ==
St. Marys Airport covers an area of 286 acres (116 ha) at an elevation of 23 feet (7 m) above mean sea level. It has two asphalt paved runways: 4/22 is 5,021 by 100 feet (1,530 x 30 m) and 13/31 is 4,000 by 75 feet (1,219 x 23 m).

For the 12-month period ending June 20, 2011, the airport had 4,000 aircraft operations, an average of 10 per day: 99% general aviation and 1% military. At that time there were 29 aircraft based at this airport: 62% single-engine, 3% multi-engine and 35% ultralight.

== Restricted airspace and relocation controversy ==
The airport and the local government has faced controversy in recent years regarding the possible relocation of the airport in response to national security concerns.

The airport was closed for three months following the September 11, 2001 terrorist attacks, as a result of its position approximately one mile south of Naval Submarine Base Kings Bay. The Federal Aviation Administration created a Temporary Flight Restriction below 5,000 feet (1,500 m) and a radius of five miles (8 km) from the base, effectively eliminating all traffic. Aircraft based at that field were eventually allowed to leave under special permission of air traffic control, but the existing Fixed-Base Operator suffered substantial financial difficulties during this time.

The airport was reopened on December 3, 2001, with the creation of a smaller temporary flight restriction located approximately one half mile from the departure end of runway 4. That restriction became permanent on February 16, 2006, with the creation of Prohibited Airspace P-50, an airspace encompassing all airspace below 3,000 feet (910 m) within a three-mile (5 km) radius of the submarine base's waterfront operations.

Almost immediately after the September 2001 temporary flight restriction was created, the Navy pressed for a permanent closure of the airport for national security reasons. As a result, in April 2004 the city received a grant of $236,538 from the Department of Transportation for an airport relocation study. Nine possible sites were studied by Reynolds, Smith and Hills, a contracted consultant, with a final site approved on February 17, 2005. The new airport location will be south of Woodbine, Georgia, on 500 acres (2.0 km^{2}) of donated land. The anticipated cost is $29 million, with 90% of the construction costs paid by the Department of Transportation.

The approval for the airport was not without controversy. In February 2007, the St. Marys city council and the St. Marys Airport Authority entered disputes over both airport ownership and whether the airport should even be moved. This eventually led to litigation. On October 2, 2008, the court ruled that the city and not the airport authority had legal control over the property, allowing the move to proceed.

The current estimated costs are now $40 million+ and the controversy continues due to the environmental impacts to over 230 acres (0.93 km^{2}) of fragile wetland, the effects upon the Rose Basin and the Satilla River, threatened species and the 100 Year Floodplain.

Local and state environmental organizations protest what has been referred to as "a potential environmental disaster".

Meanwhile, the Sea Island Company (the firm "donating" the land known as "Site 1") struggles with on-going financial issues.

There had been no written document from the Navy (or any other official governmental body) that requested either the closure or relocation of St. Marys Airport until September 2012. This was due to concerns involving skydivers accidentally landing on Naval Submarine Base Kings Bay. The skydiving company ceased operations at St. Marys Airport. The fate of the airport is still unknown.

As of February 16, 2017, the airport is scheduled to close permanently on July 14, 2017, with all airplanes to vacate the airport by July 1.

As of 2020, aerial photos show the airport with the "X" symbol on the runways showing the airport is closed. It is no longer on the FAA database.
