= Harrietts Bluff, Georgia =

Unincorporated community in Georgia, United States

Harrietts Bluff
- Unincorporated community
- Harrietts Bluff, Georgia
- Location in the State of Georgia
- Coordinates: 30°50′24″N 81°32′38″W
- Country: United States
- State: Georgia
- County: Camden
- Elevation: 10 ft (3.0 m)
- Time zone: UTC−5 (EST)
  - Summer (DST): UTC−4 (EDT)
- ZIP code: 31569 (Woodbine)
- Area code: 912
- GNIS feature ID: Populated Place

Harrietts Bluff (sometimes spelled Harriett's Bluff) is an unincorporated community located in east-central Camden County in the U.S. state of Georgia. The community is situated along the maritime coast of the Atlantic coastal plain, positioned between Interstate 95 to the west and the salt marshes of the Crooked River to the east. It has a population of approximately 2,500 residents.

== History ==
In the late 18th and early 19th centuries, the Harrietts Bluff peninsula was characterized by coastal agricultural plantations. A prominent estate in the area was the Black Point plantation, located midway up the northeast side of the bluff along the coast, which was owned by Thomas Ellis Hardee following his marriage in 1818. The property was subsequently sold to John Floyd in 1827.

=== Thiokol Plant and Explosion ===
In 1964, the Thiokol Chemical Corporation constructed an expansive industrial plant on a 7,400-acre site located at the eastern terminus of Harrietts Bluff Road. The facility was originally built to manufacture and test solid propellant rocket motors for NASA. Following the reduction of NASA's space program funding in the late 1960s, the plant pivoted its operations under a Department of Defense contract to manufacture trip flares and ammunition for the Vietnam War.

On February 3, 1971, a fire ignited in Building M-132 where trip flares were being manufactured and stored. The fire triggered a catastrophic explosion that leveled the building, killed 29 workers, and severely injured more than 50 others. The incident remains one of the worst industrial disasters in Georgia history and is memorialized at the Thiokol Memorial Museum in nearby Kingsland.

== Recreation and Geography ==
Harrietts Bluff is a low-elevation coastal locality heavily influenced by the surrounding tidal waterways. The area has transitioned into a residential and coastal recreation community, supported by local infrastructure managed by the Camden County Public Services Authority.

Key amenities include:

- Harriett's Bluff Community Park: A 21-acre county park featuring a nature trail, playground, basketball court, tennis court, and an event pavilion complete with a full kitchen.
- Harriett's Bluff Boat Ramp: Located at 303 Crooked River Drive, this public maritime facility provides boaters and fishermen direct access to the Crooked River, Cumberland Sound, and the Atlantic Ocean.

== Infrastructure ==
The community's primary transportation artery is Harrietts Bluff Road, which connects the peninsula westward to Exit 7 on Interstate 95. Harrietts Bluff does not maintain an independent post office or civil municipality. Mail delivery and postal services are administered via the United States Post Office in Woodbine, under the ZIP code 31569.
