= Burnt Fort, Georgia =

Unincorporated community and ghost town in Georgia, U.S.

Burnt Fort New Hanover, Burntfort
- Unincorporated community and ghost town
- Burnt Fort, Georgia
- Location of Burnt Fort in the State of Georgia
- Coordinates: 30°56′44″N 81°53′53″W
- Country: United States
- State: Georgia
- County: Camden County
- Settled as New Hanover: 1755
- Renamed Burnt Fort: c. 1800s
- Time zone: UTC−5 (EST)
  - Summer (DST): UTC−4 (EDT)
- Area code: 912
- GNIS ID: 354913

Burnt Fort, originally known as New Hanover, is an unincorporated community and ghost town situated along the Satilla River in western Camden County, in the U.S. state of Georgia. The GNIS classifies the historic site as a populated place.

First settled in the mid-18th century as a renegade trading post in colonial "neutral ground," the location later evolved into a strategic military outpost and a bustling late-19th-century timber-rafting settlement before depopulating in the mid-20th century.

== Geography ==
Burnt Fort is located roughly 30 miles (48 km) up the Satilla River in the rural interior of Camden County, near modern Georgia State Route 252. Geographically, the community marks the definitive entry point into the river's tidal zone, where the freshwater river transitions into extensive brackish coastal salt marshes.

== History ==
=== Colonial New Hanover (1755–1759) ===
The history of the community began in April 1755, when Edmund Gray, a Quaker political adventurer from Virginia, led a group of debtors and outlaws south of British-governed territory. Seeking refuge, Gray established a settlement named New Hanover on the banks of the Satilla River, which lay within the "neutral lands" separating British Georgia from Spanish Florida. Gray's group aggressively platted a town, constructing houses, shops, and a trading post.

Because the settlement sat in a highly sensitive border zone, it drew immediate condemnation from Great Britain, Spain, and the local Creek Nation. To prevent an international confrontation, Georgia Colonial Governor Henry Ellis and South Carolina authorities ordered the community dismantled. In January 1759, British commissioners arrived to evict the settlers and burned the town, leaving only a fortified trading post and stockade intact.

=== Military Outpost and Naming ===
Following the destruction of New Hanover, frontier settlers continued utilizing the remaining stockade as a defensive refuge during localized conflicts with Native Americans. In 1793, Captain James Randolph established "Burnt Fort Station" at the site, garrisoning a squadron of dragoons tasked with protecting Camden County's western border from Creek Indian raids.

Sometime during the early 19th century, the historic military stockade was permanently destroyed by fire. Consequently, the old name of New Hanover faded, and the locality became known across regional records interchangeably as "Burnt Fort" or "Burntfort."

=== The Timber Era and Decline ===
By the 1840s, the community reemerged as a major commercial logging hub. The settlement operated as a primary terminal for the Wiregrass region's booming yellow pine timber industry. Loggers floated massive pine rafts down the Satilla River to Burnt Fort, where deep-draft ocean-going vessels met them to load timber for international export.

A post office under the name Burnt Fort opened in 1908 to service the timber town, operating until its closure in 1917 as regional logging networks shifted elsewhere. A commercial ferry crossing operated at the site until the 1920s, when it was superseded by a vehicle bridge along Georgia State Route 252. The timber operations slowed significantly in the mid-20th century, rendering the old town core extinct.

== Historic Structures ==
While the original town footprint has largely disappeared, two notable historic structures remain preserved off Route 252:

- Burnt Fort Chapel and Cemetery: A multi-denominational congregation was organized at the site in 1872. The original historic chapel structure was closed due to declining attendance in 1947 and collapsed in the 1960s. In 1976, local descendants formed an association to completely rebuild the chapel on its original footprint using local heart-pine lumber, dedicating the new building in 1977. The adjacent historic cemetery features notable stone crypts and grave markers dating back to the 1850s.
- Midriver Schoolhouse: Standing immediately adjacent to the chapel, this structure is the last remaining one-room schoolhouse in Camden County. Built around 1890 in the nearby community of Midriver, it was physically moved to Burnt Fort via oxcart in 1918 and operated until 1922 before being restored by the local historical association.
