= Spring Bluff =

Spring Bluff can refer to:

== Places ==
Australia

- Spring Bluff, Queensland, locality in the Toowoomba Region

United States

- Spring Bluff, Georgia, unincorporated community
- Spring Bluff, Missouri, unincorporated community
- Springbluff, Wisconsin, ghost town
