= Bullhead Bluff, Georgia =

Unincorporated community in Georgia, United States

Coordinates: 30°53′08″N 81°50′44″W

Bullhead Bluff
- Unincorporated community
- Bullhead Bluff, Georgia
- Location in the State of Georgia
- Country: United States
- State: Georgia
- County: Camden
- Time zone: UTC−5 (EST)
  - Summer (DST): UTC−4 (EDT)
- Area code: 912

Bullhead Bluff is an unincorporated community in western Camden County, in the U.S. state of Georgia, near the Charlton County line. It lies along the south bank of the Satilla River, off Georgia Highway 110. Camden County's government lists Bullhead Bluff among its recognized unincorporated communities, along with Dover Bluff, Hopewell, Spring Bluff, Waverly, and White Oak.

== History ==
Following emancipation, formerly enslaved people from Robert Stafford's plantation on Cumberland Island settled near Bullhead Bluff and found work in the area's timber industry. Many of these settlers took the Stafford surname, and their descendants were buried in a cemetery near Bullhead Bluff Road known by several names, including the Stafford, Gibbs, or Silco cemetery. As of a site visit in December 2020, the cemetery was reported to be heavily overgrown, with most grave markers no longer legible.

The Manning family has owned and subdivided land in the Bullhead Bluff area since the mid-19th century and maintains a private family cemetery there that remains in active use.

== Geography and infrastructure ==
Bullhead Bluff is a rural community along Georgia Highway 110. The community is named among Camden County's unincorporated areas covered by the county's 2024 Community Wildfire Protection Plan, developed with funding from a U.S. Forest Service Community Wildfire Defense Program grant and managed by the Georgia Forestry Commission.
