= Spring Bluff, Georgia =

- Unincorporated community
- Location of Spring Bluff in the State of Georgia
- Coordinates: 31°06′21″N 81°37′47″W
- Country: United States
- State: Georgia
- County: Camden
- Elevation: 20 ft (6.1 m)
- Time zone: UTC-5 (Eastern (EST))
  - Summer (DST): UTC-4 (EDT)
- ZIP Code: 31565
- Area code: 912
- GNIS feature ID: 323356

Spring Bluff is an unincorporated community located in the northeastern corner of Camden County, Georgia, United States.

Situated on a natural high-ground knoll on the southern bank of the Little Satilla River, the community sits at an elevation of 20 feet (6 m). It is part of the Brunswick Metropolitan Statistical Area and shares the 31565 ZIP Code with neighboring Waverly.

== History ==
The community possesses a deeply rooted history along the Georgia coast, with records of its geographical descriptor spanning back to the colonial era. According to historian Kenneth Krakow, the place-name "Spring Bluff" has been utilized in regional documentation for well over 250 years, likely originating from a natural freshwater spring situated along the river bluff. Local land deeds dating back to 1763 identify boundaries relative to the landmark, noting early English property grants west of the bluff.

During the antebellum era, Spring Bluff operated within the coastal plantation system, acting as an adjunct workplace and maritime access point for nearby agricultural estates, including the Major John Hardee Rural Felicity plantation.

During the American Civil War, the defensive advantages of the high knoll overlooking the Little Satilla River made it a strategic position. A minor military skirmish occurred here between local Confederate forces and scouting parties from the Union blockading fleet trying to interdict salt-making operations along the coast. Following the reconstruction era, the local economy shifted towards timber harvesting and naval stores, notably supporting a prominent local turpentine still industry through the early 20th century.

== Geography and Landmarks ==
Spring Bluff is heavily defined by its proximity to the tidal salt marshes and maritime ecosystems of the Little Satilla River. Notable community landmarks include:

- Spring Bluff Boat Ramp: Positioned immediately adjacent to the U.S. Route 17 bridge, this public roadside boat ramp serves as a principal access point for regional anglers and boaters exploring the coastal waterways.
- Rising Daughter Baptist Church: Established in 1900 near the salt marshes, this historic African American congregation has served as a central cultural and spiritual pillar for the local rural populace for generations.

== Transportation ==
The community is directly traversed by U.S. Route 17 (historically known as the Ocean Highway), which serves as the primary north–south arterial roadway connecting northern Camden County to Glynn County. Through U.S. 17, residents have access to Interstate 95 via nearby highway junctions, facilitating transit to Brunswick and Jacksonville.
