= Ceylon, Georgia =

Unincorporated community and ghost town in Georgia, U.S.

Ceylon Big Pasture, Ceylon Mill Village
- Unincorporated community and ghost town
- Ceylon, Georgia
- Location of Ceylon in the State of Georgia
- Coordinates: 30°57′42″N 81°39′02″W
- Country: United States
- State: Georgia
- County: Camden County
- Mill Founded: 1874
- Abandoned: c. 1915–1916
- Time zone: UTC−5 (EST)
  - Summer (DST): UTC−4 (EDT)
- Area code: 912
- GNIS ID: 331370

Ceylon, also known locally as Big Pasture, is an unincorporated community and ghost town situated on Floyd's Neck along the southern bluff of the Satilla River in northern Camden County, in the U.S. state of Georgia. The GNIS classifies the location as a populated place.

Established in the post-Civil War era as a prominent deepwater timber port and company mill village, the settlement was entirely abandoned following a catastrophic industrial accident in 1915. Today, the site is preserved as part of a state-managed wildlife conservation tract.

== History ==
=== Early settlement and naming ===
In the pre-colonial era, the area around Ceylon was inhabited by the Native American Timucua people and was the approximate site of the village of Yufera, which faded from European records by the mid-17th century. During the 1760s, the British Crown began issuing land grants in the area to white settlers. In 1800, Charles Floyd acquired a large portion of the peninsula, which subsequently became known as Floyd's Neck. Throughout the antebellum period, the site encompassed three large, labor-intensive cotton and rice plantations: Gatehouse, Hermitage, and Pine Barrens.

The community was named after British Ceylon (modern-day Sri Lanka), an exotic South Asian island nation heavily associated in the 19th-century British Empire with booming agricultural production, specifically rice and tea shipping.

=== Industrial boom (1874–1914) ===
Following the economic devastation of the American Civil War and the subsequent collapse of the plantation system, regional enterprise shifted toward the exploitation of Southeast Georgia's vast virgin yellow pine and longleaf timber reserves. In 1874, the Hilton and Dodge Timber Company selected Ceylon's southern river bluff to erect a massive steam-powered lumber mill and company town, officially known as Ceylon Mill Village.

Ceylon's unique geography featured an unusually deep waterfront along the Satilla River channel, making it a highly valuable interior port. Loggers floated timber rafts down the upstream Satilla watershed directly to the mill, where it was processed and loaded directly into deep-draft ocean-going cargo ships destined for international markets. To accommodate the workforce, a self-contained town emerged around the mill, featuring residential housing, a company store, and a local cemetery. A post office under the name Ceylon was established in 1905 to service the community's growing maritime trade.

=== Boiler explosion and abandonment (1915–1916) ===
The town's economic lifespan came to an abrupt and violent end in late 1915. According to local history, a night watchman at the lumber mill failed to maintain proper water levels inside the facility's high-pressure iron steam boiler. The empty, superheated boiler suffered a catastrophic explosion, tearing through the mill's superstructure and throwing heavy shrapnel entirely across to the north bank of the Satilla River.

With the primary mill completely destroyed and the regional timber harvest already beginning to wane upstream, Hilton and Dodge opted not to rebuild. The company systematically dismantled or relocated the remaining residential village buildings, and the post office was permanently discontinued in 1916. Left completely depopulated, the town center quickly reverted to a maritime forest landscape.

== Modern ecology and preservation ==
Following its abandonment, the land was consolidated by the Sea Island Company for low-impact industrial timber production and private wildlife staging. Because the land was managed using controlled, low-impact prescribed fires rather than intensive clear-cutting, the landscape inadvertently preserved one of the most pristine and ecologically diverse environments on the Atlantic coast.

In the 21st century, the state of Georgia acquired the property to form the Ceylon Wildlife Management Area (WMA), a massive 27,000-acre conservation tract managed by the Georgia Department of Natural Resources. The historic town site boasts a highly rare, intact upland longleaf pine and wiregrass savanna ecosystem, with some localized longleaf pine stands verified to be over 145 years old. The conservation zone also protects critical populations of the threatened gopher tortoise. The only remaining surface remnants of the former mill town are scattered brick foundations, an actively flowing artesian well, and the historic Ceylon Cemetery, which contains burials from both the antebellum Gatehouse Plantation and the turn-of-the-century mill families.
