= Kingsland Commercial Historic District =

Historic district in Georgia, United States

- U.S. National Register of Historic Places
- U.S. Historic district
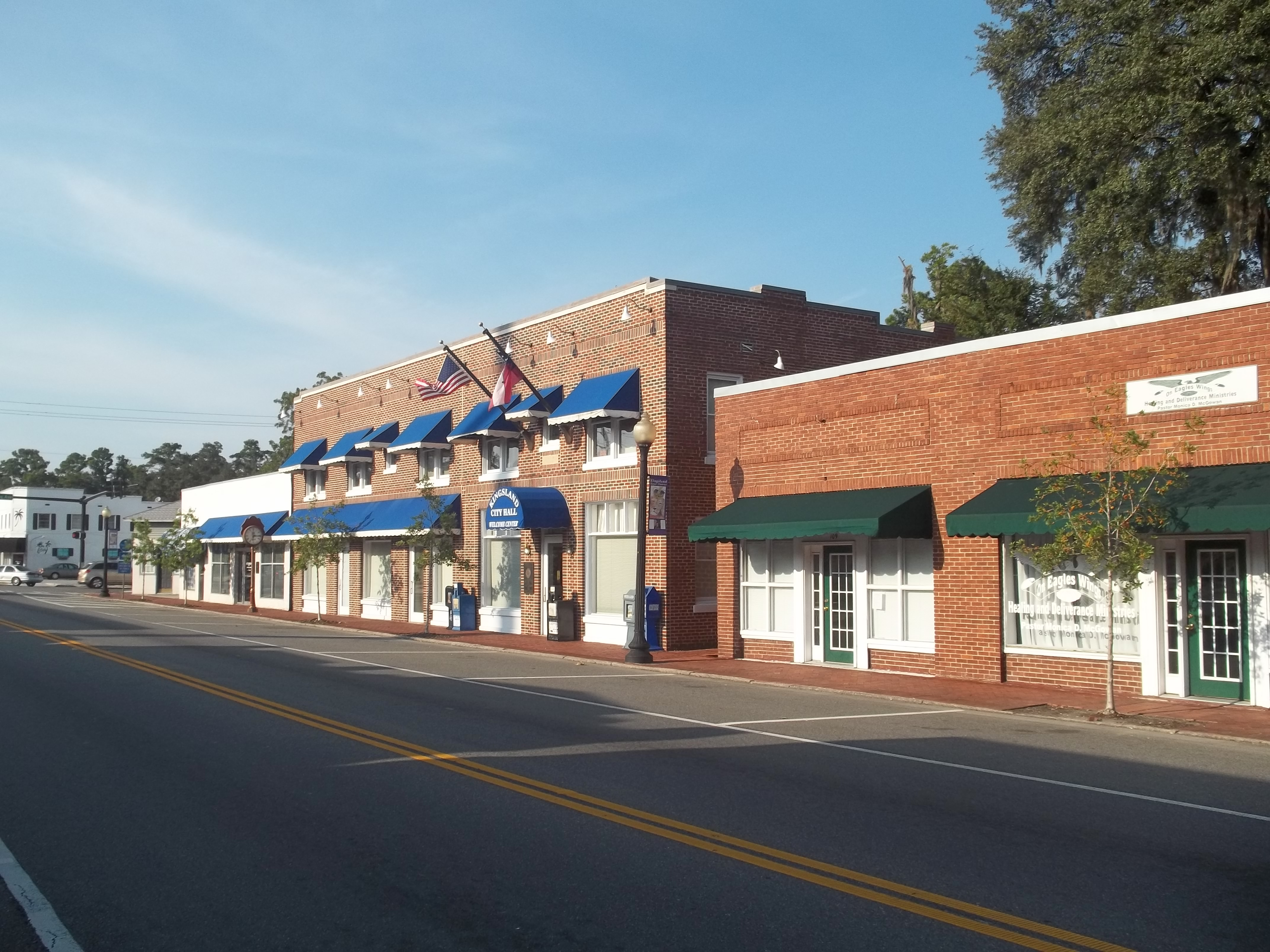

- Location within Georgia Location within the United States
- Location: Area surrounding S. Lee St. (US 17), between King and William Sts., Kingsland, Georgia
- Coordinates: 30.7995°N 81.69014°W
- Area: 1.8 acres (0.73 ha)
- Built by: Jarvis, M.M.
- Architectural style: Art Deco
- NRHP reference No.: 94000186
- Added to NRHP: March 17, 1994

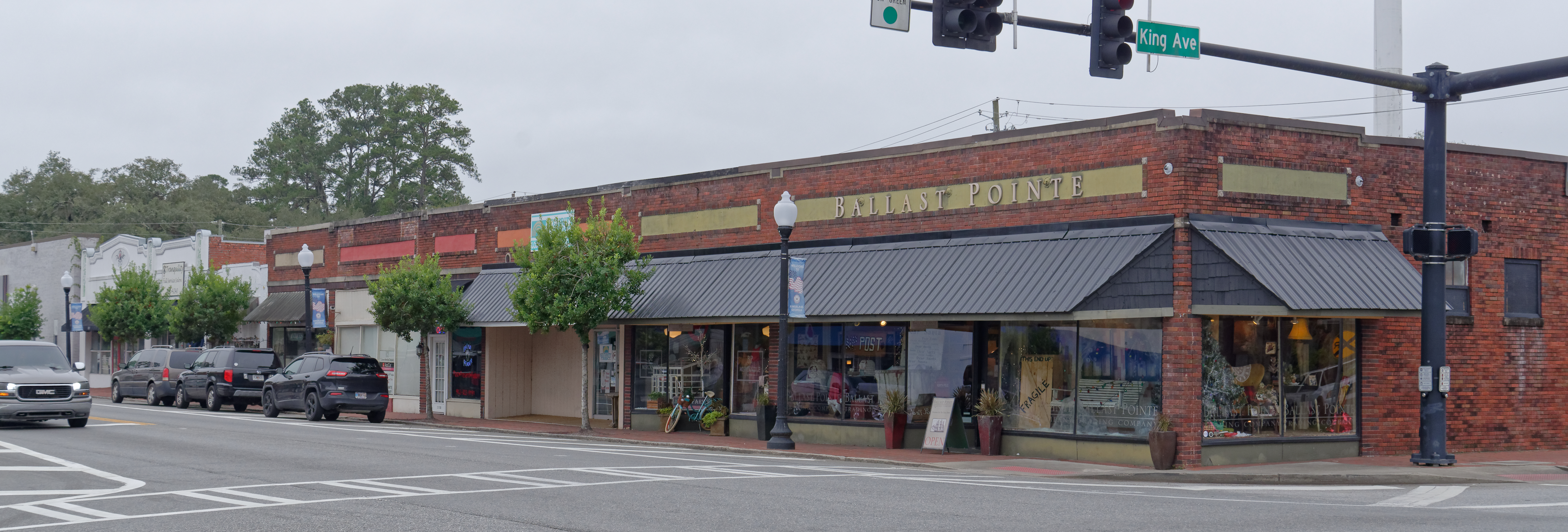
Along US 17

The Kingsland Commercial Historic District is a 2 acres (0.81 ha) historic district in Kingsland, Georgia which was listed on the National Register of Historic Places in 1994. It included six contributing buildings.

The buildings are one- and two-story, brick and stuccoed commercial buildings built during 1912 to 1943. They include:

- The former State Bank building (1912) on South Railroad Avenue, a two-story brick building
- The Camden Hotel (1929) building on South Lee Street, a two-story brick building, built by contractor M.M. Jarvis.
- The newspaper building (1925), South Lee Street, with Art Deco-influenced elements.
