= Camden County, Georgia =

County in Georgia, United States

- County
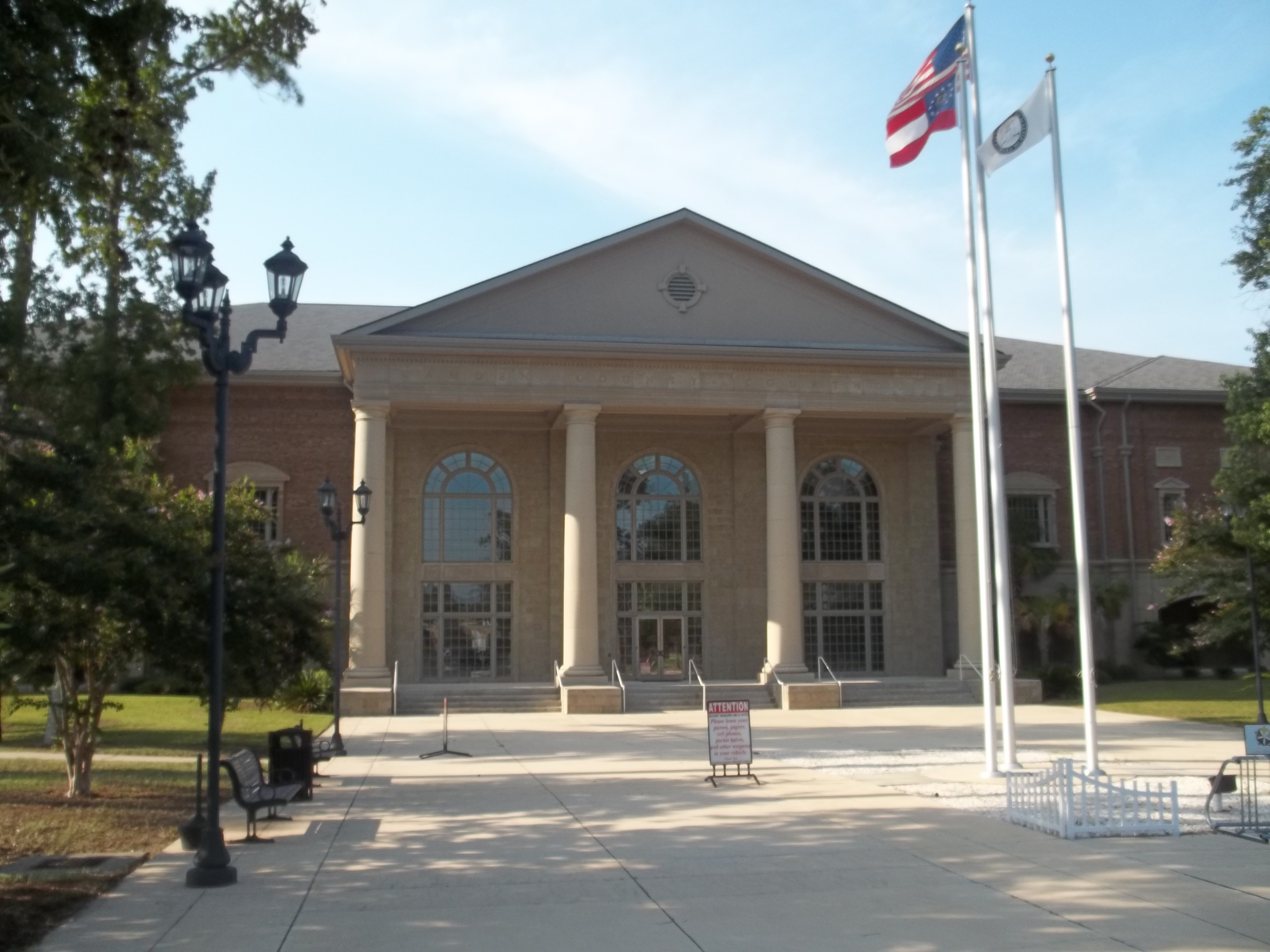
- Camden County Courthouse in Woodbine

- Flag Seal

- Location within the U.S. state of Georgia
- Coordinates: 30°55′N 81°38′W
- Country: United States
- State: Georgia
- Founded: 1777; 249 years ago
- Named for: Charles Pratt, 1st Earl Camden
- Seat: Woodbine
- Largest city: Kingsland

Area
  - Total: 782 sq mi (2,030 km^{2})
  - Land: 613 sq mi (1,590 km^{2})
  - Water: 169 sq mi (440 km^{2}) 21.6%

Population (2020)
  - Total: 54,768
  - Estimate (2025): 60,143 ▲
  - Density: 89.3/sq mi (34.5/km^{2})
- Time zone: UTC−5 (Eastern)
  - Summer (DST): UTC−4 (EDT)
- Congressional district: 1st
- Website: camdencountyga.gov

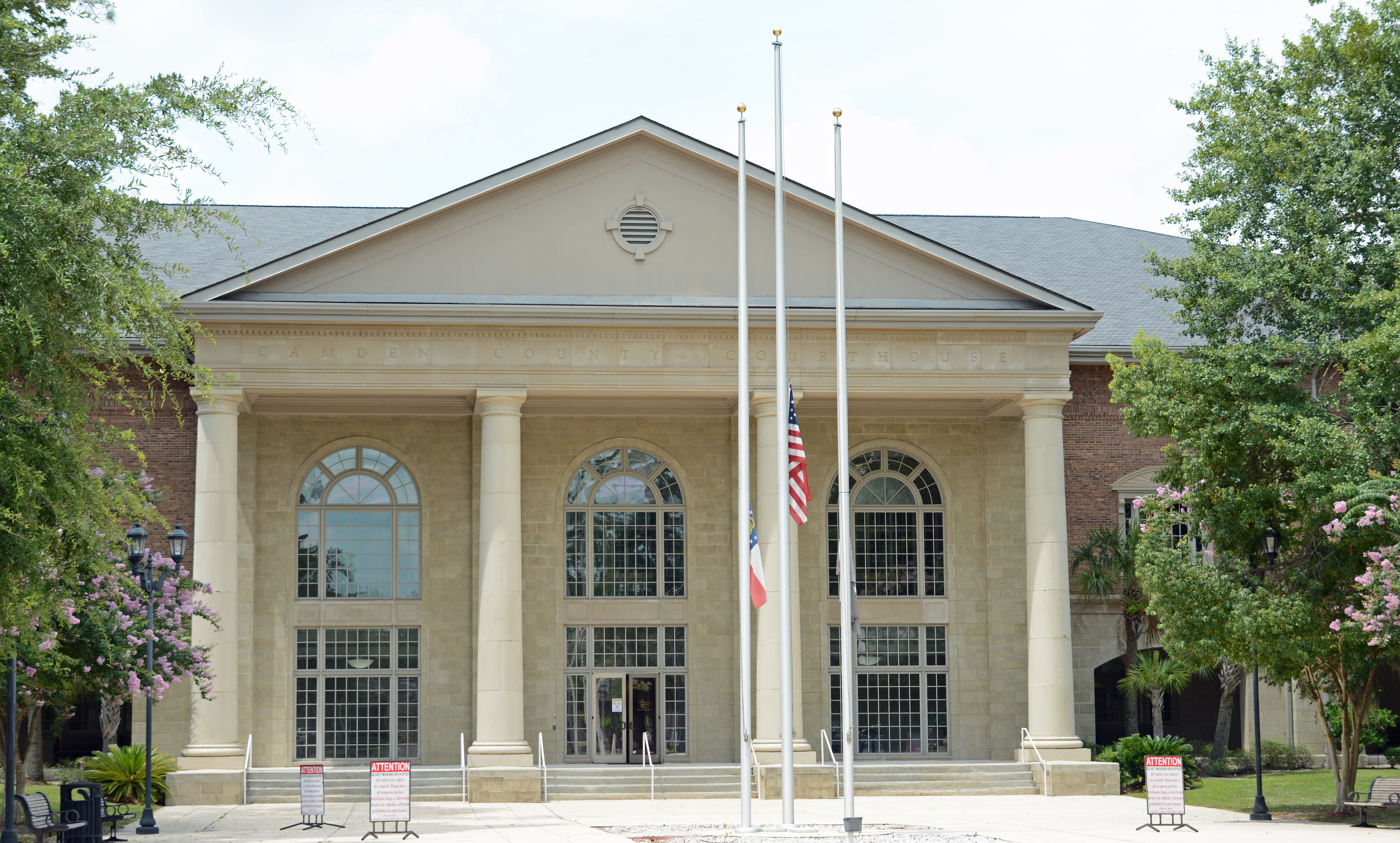
Camden County Courthouse

Camden County is a county located in the southeastern corner of the U.S. state of Georgia. According to the 2020 census, its population was 54,768. Its county seat is Woodbine, and the largest city is Kingsland. It is one of the original counties of Georgia, created February 5, 1777. It is the 11th-largest county in the state of Georgia by area, and the 41st-largest by population.

Camden County comprises the Kingsland, Georgia Micropolitan Statistical Area (USA), formerly known as the St. Marys, Georgia USA, which is included in the Jacksonville—Kingsland—Palatka, Florida–Georgia Combined Statistical Area.

== History ==
=== Colonial period ===
The first recorded European to visit what is today Camden County was Captain Jean Ribault of France in 1562. Ribault was sent out by French Huguenots to find a suitable place for a settlement. Ribault named the rivers he saw the Seine and the Some, known today as the St. Marys and Satilla Rivers. Ribault described the area as, "Fairest, fruitfulest and pleasantest of all the world."

In 1565, Spain became alarmed by the French settlements and sent out a large force to take over and settle the area. During that time, the Spaniards attempted to convert the Native Americans to Catholicism. At least two missions operated on Cumberland Island, ministering to the Timucuan people, who had resided on the island for at least 4,000 years.

Competing British and Spanish claims to the territory between their respective colonies of South Carolina and Florida was a source of international tension, and the colony of Georgia was founded in 1733 in part to protect the British interests. The Spanish theoretically lost their claim to the territory in 1742 after the Battle of Bloody Marsh (on St. Simons Island). However, settlement south of the Altamaha River (what is now Glynn and Camden Counties) was discouraged by both the British and Spanish governments. One group of settlers led by Edmund Gray sparked Spanish military action after settling on the Satilla River in the 1750s near present-day Burnt Fort, and were subsequently disbanded by the Royal Governor John Reynolds.

General Oglethorpe was at Cumberland Island when Tomochichi gave the barrier island its name. Later, he erected a hunting lodge on Cumberland named Dungeness, which was the predecessor of the famous Greene and Carnegie Dungeness Mansions. He also founded Fort St. Andrews on the north end of Cumberland Island, as well as a strong battery, Fort Prince Williams, on the south end. Fort Prince Williams commanded the entrance to the St. Marys River but had become a ruin by the Revolutionary War.

In 1763, Spain, under a treaty of peace with Great Britain, ceded Florida to the British. After this, the boundaries of Georgia were extended from the Altamaha (now the southern boundary of McIntosh County) to the St. Marys River (the current southern boundary of Camden). In 1765, four parishes were laid out between the Altamaha and St. Marys Rivers: St. David's, St. Patrick's, St. Mary's, and St. Thomas.

=== Early American era ===
Largely due to security issues arising from proximity to powerful Indian groups and British Florida, Georgia was the last colony to join in the War for Independence in 1775. In the Georgia Constitution of 1777 St. Thomas and St. Marys Parishes were formed into Camden County, named for Charles Pratt, 1st Earl Camden in England, a supporter of American independence. Originally Camden County was larger; it gave up territory to form part of present-day Wayne County in 1808 and 1812, and part of present-day Charlton County in 1854.

Also under the 1777 state constitution, Glynn County and Camden County had limited and restricted representation in the new patriotic Georgia government due to their extreme "state of alarm" throughout the war. Between 1776 and 1778 Camden County saw the construction of numerous forts, three failed American campaigns against the British at St. Augustine, and numerous depredations by raiders of various allegiance. One of the most notorious of these raiders was Daniel McGirth. A significant loyalist faction existed in Camden County, headed by the brothers of Royal Governor James Wright, Charles and German Wright. They built a fort on the St. Marys River in 1775 to protect their lands and chattel during the war after repeated attacks by patriot banditti. Wright's Fort became a rendezvous for a group of loyalists called the "Florida Rangers". Two skirmishes were fought by Loyalist and Continental forces over Wright's Fort, and both times American troops failed to rout the Loyalists from the area. Finally, retreating British soldiers burned it down in 1778. The Americans rebuilt it when they invaded East Florida, and then burned it down to prevent it falling into enemy hands. The archaeological site was rediscovered in 1975.

The primary economic enterprise of the county was rice planting, particularly along the Satilla River. Sea Island cotton was grown on Cumberland Island, and short-staple cotton was grown on the mainland along with sugar cane. Various forest products including turpentine and timber were produced, mainly for consumption in the naval industry and the West Indies. Camden County also served as a hub of backcountry trade with American settlers and various Indian groups, and as a shipyard and shipping center centered around the town of St. Marys.

Camden County was the site of many trading posts with the Native Americans, who by the late eighteenth and early nineteenth centuries consisted mainly of people of the Creek Nation. Trader's Hill, on the St. Marys River in what was then Camden County (now Charlton County), was one of the most important Creek trading centers in the Southeast and, from the 1790s onward, a refuge for settlers during periods of conflict with Creek and Seminole raiding parties, including the killing of two men at the trading post in 1793. An important step towards establishing boundaries in the Early Federal period came with the Treaty of Colerain which was signed on June 29, 1796, on the St. Marys between United States agents and the Creeks.

Many men from Camden County volunteered to fight under John Houstoun McIntosh, a wealthy landowner in the region, during the Patriot War in Florida in 1811. These men would go on to help capture the town of Fernandina, Florida.

On January 15, 1815, British troops led by Sir George Cockburn landed on Cumberland Island. Their goal was to attack the fort at Point Peter. They quickly overwhelmed the small American forced and took Ft. Point Peter easily. After the skirmish, British soldiers occupied the county through February. They raided the town of St. Marys, as well as many plantations and smaller settlements. Although New Orleans was the last major battle of the war, the skirmish at Point Peter happened even later, almost a month after the Treaty of Ghent had been signed. The British occupation of Camden County led to the liberation of an estimated 1,485 slaves from Georgia and Florida.

Camden County was on an international border until the Adams–Onís Treaty of 1819 between the United States and Spain, making the Florida provinces American territory.

=== Civil War and Reconstruction ===
At the beginning of the Civil War, Camden County's population was 5,420, including 1,276 white residents, 4,143 enslaved people, and one free person of color. During the war, many of the county's civilians moved farther inland, particularly to Centerville and Trader's Hill on the St. Marys River in Charlton County. The inhabitant's fears were realized when the town of St. Marys was attacked and shelled by United States Navy gunboats. At least one federal party to "carry off" slaves was met by armed resistance on White Oak Creek off the Satilla River.

Camden County organized four volunteer companies: the Camden Chasseurs, St. Marys Volunteers Guard, Camden Rifles, and Camden County Guards.

Camden County land fell under Sherman's Special Field Order No. 15. which dictated the distribution of parcels of land to freedmen. However, by 1868, Camden County's freedmen found themselves dispossessed of land they had lived and worked on since emancipation or earlier. Confiscated lands were returned to former landowners. During the first years of Reconstruction, Republican candidates and many local blacks were able to gain political victories. The first Democratic victory in the county after the war went to Ray Tompkins. This signaled a return to a white political majority and the end of the Reconstruction Era concurrent with the statewide Democratic victory in 1870.

=== 1890s - 2000 ===
Earlier plans for railways in the area dated back to the 1830s, but construction was never begun. In 1893, Florida Central and Peninsular Railroad built a Savannah-Jacksonville line through Camden County. In 1923 the county seat of Camden County was moved from St. Marys to Woodbine, a reflection of the shift from the water transportation to railways. In 1927, U.S. Route 17 was constructed through Woodbine and Kingsland.

From 1917 to 1937, a pogy plant producing oil for Procter & Gamble and fertilizer for the Southern Fertilizer and Chemical Company was one of the major economic activities of the area. The layoffs from the pogy plant found relief when the Gilman Paper Company came to the county in 1939. The company was sold to Durango Paper Co. in 1999, and went out of business in 2002, resulting in 900 workers losing their jobs.

In 1965, Thiokol Chemical launched a 13-foot (4.0 m)-diameter, 3,000,000-pound-force (13,000 kN)-thrust rocket from their chemical plant in the eastern part of the county. On February 3, 1971, a fire and explosion occurred at the plant, located 12 miles southeast of Woodbine. The industrial accident killed 29 workers and seriously injured 50 others.

During World War II, the Georgia State Guard and local Home Guard held bases on Cumberland Island. The island and surrounding waters were also patrolled by the United States Coast Guard. The U.S. Army began to acquire land south of Crooked River in 1954 to build a military ocean terminal to ship ammunition in case of a national emergency.

In November 1976, the area of Kings Bay was selected for a submarine base. Soon afterward, the first Navy personnel arrived in the Kings Bay area and started preparations for the orderly transfer of property from the Army to the Navy. Naval Submarine Base Kings Bay not only occupies the former Army terminal land, but several thousand additional acres. Camden County's population grew enormously after the military took an interest in the area, and during the 1980s, was the fourth fastest growing county in the United States.

Cumberland Island National Seashore was established in 1972 to protect and preserve the natural and historic resources of the island. Crooked River State Park was established in 1985.

=== Since 2000 ===
In 2009, the Camden County Sheriff's Office was ordered by the Justice Department to repay $662,000 of improperly spent funds seized from alleged criminals before it would be allowed to participate in the Justice Department's equitable sharing program. Items that were determined to have been purchased by the Camden County Sheriff's Department improperly included a Dodge Viper purchased for approximately $90,000 which the Sheriff's Office intended to use in anti-drug programs.

==== Spaceport Camden ====
In 2012, the Camden County Joint Development Authority began considering developing a spaceport for both horizontal and vertical spacecraft operations. In June 2015, the Camden board decided to formally advance the Spaceport Camden project by initiating an FAA environmental impact assessment of the 4000+ acre facility.

In a 2022 referendum voters overturned the Camden County Board of Commissioners' vote on the option for the proposed Spaceport Camden property. In February 2023, the Georgia Supreme Court upheld this referendum, effectively ending the project.

==== Gilman Paper Company Site ====
The Gilman Paper Mill opened during 1941 in Camden County. For more than two decades it employed half of the St. Mary's residents and fueled the economy. By the end of the 20th century, ownership had changed twice, finally to Mexico's Durango Products. The plant was closed in 2002.

The property was purchased in 2005 at a bankruptcy auction by a Jacksonville developer. He planned a 2,000-home development, only to abandon the project following the 2008 financial crisis.

In 2020, Jacoby Development was chosen as project developer because their portfolio contained successful rehabilitation projects: Atlantic Station and Aerotropolis Atlanta. The Cumberland Inlet development project involved clearing and remediating the paper mill site, then building an ecotourism base camp on the waterfront with a hotel and marina, RV park, commercial spaces and home rentals. Brian Kemp, Georgia's Governor was in attendance at the groundbreaking for the Cumberland Inlet development, expressing optimism about the planned $500 million project.

The Camden County Joint Development Authority borrowed almost $11 million in seed money to be repaid in regular installments starting in 2023. The Jacoby Development subsidiary made the first two payments, but the third payment of $736,000 was missed. Some of the project work was completed, but in 2025, the CCJDA filed a lawsuit seeking repayment of over $9 million in loans for the stalled Cumberland Inlet redevelopment project. In early 2026 CCJDA announced that they have recovered ownership of the property.

== Local government ==
=== County commissioners ===
The Camden County Board of Commissioners is made up of five members elected by district to staggered four year terms. Each year, the Board selects a Chair and Vice Chair from among its members. The Board establishes county policies, adopts ordinances, sets the budget and tax rates, and appoints a County Administrator to oversee daily operations and carry out Commission policies. Regular meetings are typically held on the first and third Tuesday of each month at 6:00 p.m. in the Commission Chambers at the Government Services Complex in Woodbine.

| District | Commissioner | Term Expires |
|---|---|---|
| 1 | Robbie Cheek, Chair | 12/31/2028 |
| 2 | Martin Turner, Vice-Chair | 12/31/2026 |
| 3 | Cody Smith | 12/31/2028 |
| 4 | Jim Goodman | 12/31/2026 |
| 5 | Ben L. Casey | 12/31/2028 |

=== Magistrate Judge ===
Judge Jennifer Lewis serves as the elected Chief Magistrate Judge. The Magistrate Court is Georgia’s small claims court and handles most civil cases up to $15,000, along with dispossessory, garnishment, and writ of possession matters. Magistrate judges also issue warrants, set bonds, and conduct preliminary hearings.

=== Probate Judge ===
Judge Robert C. Sweatt, Jr. serves as the elected Probate Judge. The Probate Court provides services related to birth and death certificates, estates, guardianships, marriage certificates and licenses, traffic citations, weapons carry licenses, and wills.

=== Sheriff ===
Sheriff James Kevin Chaney was elected in November 2024 and took office in January 2025. The Camden County Sheriff's Office consists of multiple divisions including Administration, Chaplain, Courthouse, Corrections, E-911, Finance, Information Technology, Investigations/Drug Task Force, K-9, Patrol, Public Information, School Resources Deputies, Special Operations & Training, and Warrants.

=== Superior Court Clerk ===
Joy Lynn Turner serves as the elected Clerk of Superior Court. The office serves as the official custodian of land and property records, as well as civil and criminal court files, while supporting court operations through filing, records management, and jury administration. The Clerk’s office also handles duties such as deed recording, tax collection related to property transfers, lien and trade name filings, and the collection and disbursement of court fines and fees.

=== Superior Court Judges ===
Camden County is a part of the Brunswick Judicial Circuit, along with Appling, Glynn, Jeff Davis, and Wayne counties. Superior Court Judges serving Camden County, serve the entire Brunswick Judicial Circuit.

=== Tax Commissioner ===
Beth Soles serves as the elected Tax Commissioner. The Tax Commissioner’s Office manages several important services for residents. These responsibilities include issuing vehicle tags and titles, mobile home permits and titles, and handicap parking placards. The office also collects ad valorem taxes on vehicles, mobile homes, and property.

== Geography ==
According to the U.S. Census Bureau, the county has a total area of 782 square miles (2,030 km^{2}), of which 613 square miles (1,590 km^{2}) is land and 169 square miles (440 km^{2}) (21.6%) is water.

The bulk of Camden County's central and western area, from an east–west line running through Waverly in the north to a line running from Charlton County northeast to St. Andrew Sound, is located in the Satilla River sub-basin of the St. Marys-Satilla basin. The area north of Waverly, as well as from west of Kingsland east to the coast of Cumberland Island, is located in the Cumberland-St. Simons sub-basin of the St. Marys-Satilla River basin. Camden County's southern border area, in a line from Charlton County to St. Marys, is located in the St. Marys River sub-basin of the same St. Marys-Satilla basin.

The 1898 Georgia hurricane which made landfall on Cumberland Island in Camden County was the strongest hurricane to hit the state of Georgia within recorded history.

=== Adjacent counties ===
- Glynn County (north)
- Nassau County, Florida (south)
- Charlton County (west)
- Brantley County (northwest)

=== National protected area ===
- Cumberland Island National Seashore

== Communities ==
=== Cities ===
- Kingsland
- St. Marys
- Woodbine (county seat)

=== Census-designated places ===
- Kings Bay Base
- Waverly

=== Unincorporated communities ===
- Bullhead Bluff
- Colesburg
- Dover Bluff
- Harrietts Bluff
- Hopewell
- Jefferson (Jeffersonton)
- Seals
- Spring Bluff
- Tarboro
- White Oak

=== Ghost towns ===
- Burnt Fort (New Hanover)
- Ceylon
- Colerain

== Transportation ==
=== Airports ===
Camden County's primary airport was previously St. Marys Airport, a facility serving general aviation just north of the eponymous city, but it was closed in 2017 due to its close proximity to the US Navy’s Naval Submarine Base Kings Bay. Instead, residents seeking airline services are required to travel north to Brunswick Golden Isles Airport, or south to the much larger Jacksonville International Airport in Florida; two general aviation airports in Florida, Fernandina Beach Municipal Airport and Jacksonville Executive at Craig Airport further south, are located between Camden County and Jacksonville.

=== Major highways ===
- I-95 / SR 405 (unsigned)
- US 17 / SR 25
  - SR 25 Spur
- SR 40
  - SR 40 Spur
- SR 110
- SR 252

=== Railroads ===
Two railroad lines operate within Camden County. The First Coast Railroad, a Genesee & Wyoming short line, leases a segment of the former Seaboard Air Line Railroad main line from CSX, running north from Yulee, Florida, through Camden County to Seals, Georgia, with an interchange with the St. Marys Railroad at Kingsland.

The St. Marys Railroad is an 11-mile short line connecting Kingsland and St. Marys, running parallel to Georgia State Route 40, and includes a roughly four-mile spur providing occasional freight service to the Naval Submarine Base Kings Bay.

== Demographics ==
Historical population
| Census | Pop. | Note | %± |
|---|---|---|---|
| 1790 | 305 | | — |
| 1800 | 1,681 | | 451.1% |
| 1810 | 3,941 | | 134.4% |
| 1820 | 4,342 | | 10.2% |
| 1830 | 4,578 | | 5.4% |
| 1840 | 6,075 | | 32.7% |
| 1850 | 6,319 | | 4.0% |
| 1860 | 5,420 | | −14.2% |
| 1870 | 4,615 | | −14.9% |
| 1880 | 6,183 | | 34.0% |
| 1890 | 6,178 | | −0.1% |
| 1900 | 7,669 | | 24.1% |
| 1910 | 7,690 | | 0.3% |
| 1920 | 6,969 | | −9.4% |
| 1930 | 6,338 | | −9.1% |
| 1940 | 5,910 | | −6.8% |
| 1950 | 7,322 | | 23.9% |
| 1960 | 9,975 | | 36.2% |
| 1970 | 11,334 | | 13.6% |
| 1980 | 13,371 | | 18.0% |
| 1990 | 30,167 | | 125.6% |
| 2000 | 43,664 | | 44.7% |
| 2010 | 50,513 | | 15.7% |
| 2020 | 54,768 | | 8.4% |
| 2025 (est.) | 60,143 | ▲ | 9.8% |
U.S. Decennial Census; 1790-1880 1890-1910; 1920-1930 1930-1940; 1940-1950 1960-1980; 1980-2000 2010 2020

=== 2020 census ===
As of the 2020 census, there were 54,768 people, 20,374 households, and 14,380 families residing in the county.

Of the residents, 23.7% were under the age of 18 and 14.5% were 65 years of age or older; the median age was 34.6 years. For every 100 females there were 101.5 males, and for every 100 females age 18 and over there were 101.1 males. 70.4% of residents lived in urban areas and 29.6% lived in rural areas.

The racial makeup of the county was 70.1% White, 17.7% Black or African American, 0.5% American Indian and Alaska Native, 1.6% Asian, 0.1% Native Hawaiian and Pacific Islander, 2.1% from some other race, and 7.9% from two or more races. Hispanic or Latino residents of any race comprised 6.7% of the population.

Of the 20,374 households, 33.6% had children under the age of 18 living with them and 24.0% had a female householder with no spouse or partner present. About 23.4% of all households were made up of individuals and 8.3% had someone living alone who was 65 years of age or older.

There were 22,541 housing units, of which 9.6% were vacant. Among occupied housing units, 64.5% were owner-occupied and 35.5% were renter-occupied. The homeowner vacancy rate was 1.7% and the rental vacancy rate was 8.9%.

=== Racial and ethnic composition ===
Camden County, Georgia – Racial and ethnic composition Note: the US Census treats Hispanic/Latino as an ethnic category. This table excludes Latinos from the racial categories and assigns them to a separate category. Hispanics/Latinos may be of any race.
| Race / Ethnicity (NH = Non-Hispanic) | Pop 1980 | Pop 1990 | Pop 2000 | Pop 2010 | Pop 2020 | % 1980 | % 1990 | % 2000 | % 2010 | % 2020 |
|---|---|---|---|---|---|---|---|---|---|---|
| White alone (NH) | 8,927 | 22,945 | 31,975 | 35,977 | 37,203 | 66.76% | 76.06% | 73.23% | 71.22% | 67.93% |
| Black or African American alone (NH) | 4,277 | 6,056 | 8,719 | 9,621 | 9,497 | 31.99% | 20.07% | 19.97% | 19.05% | 17.34% |
| Native American or Alaska Native alone (NH) | 15 | 138 | 195 | 230 | 185 | 0.11% | 0.46% | 0.45% | 0.46% | 0.34% |
| Asian alone (NH) | 38 | 382 | 429 | 706 | 845 | 0.28% | 1.27% | 0.98% | 1.40% | 1.54% |
| Native Hawaiian or Pacific Islander alone (NH) | x | x | 32 | 70 | 66 | x | x | 0.07% | 0.14% | 0.12% |
| Other race alone (NH) | 0 | 24 | 70 | 72 | 325 | 0.00% | 0.08% | 0.16% | 0.14% | 0.59% |
| Mixed race or Multiracial (NH) | x | x | 659 | 1,247 | 2,989 | x | x | 1.51% | 2.47% | 5.46% |
| Hispanic or Latino (any race) | 114 | 622 | 1,585 | 2,590 | 3,658 | 0.85% | 2.06% | 3.63% | 5.13% | 6.68% |
| Total | 13,371 | 30,167 | 43,664 | 50,513 | 54,768 | 100.00% | 100.00% | 100.00% | 100.00% | 100.00% |

== Economy ==
Camden County's economy was historically rooted in agriculture, naval stores, and timber. Turpentine and pulpwood production grew through the twentieth century into larger pulp-paper manufacturing operations, and by the late 1980s the county was Georgia's second-largest pulpwood producer. Since the late twentieth century, the county's economy has been anchored by the federal government and military, principally through Naval Submarine Base Kings Bay, alongside a growing tourism sector centered on St. Marys and Cumberland Island National Seashore.

=== Naval Submarine Base Kings Bay ===
Naval Submarine Base Kings Bay, on the St. Marys River adjacent to the city of St. Marys, is the U.S. Atlantic Fleet's homeport for Ohio-class ballistic missile submarines. The Navy began construction in 1978, and the base became operational the following year; in 1980 it was selected as the East Coast refit and training site for the Trident submarine fleet, with the first Trident submarine arriving in 1989. The base covers about 16,000 acres, including roughly 4,000 acres of protected wetlands, and its construction was, at the time, the largest peacetime building program the Navy had undertaken.

By the early 2000s, the base employed more than 9,000 military, civilian, and contract personnel, making it the county's largest employer. Its Trident Refit Facility, the base's largest tenant command, alone employs more than 2,200 people and ranks among the top employers in Camden County.

=== Tourism ===
St. Marys developed its present-day tourism economy beginning in the 1970s as the mainland departure point for ferry service to Cumberland Island National Seashore, and the city is now promoted as a coastal ecotourism destination. As of 2013, the St. Marys Convention and Visitors Bureau estimated that tourism supported about 750 local jobs and contributed roughly $78.5 million annually to the county economy.

== Education ==
=== Public schools ===
Camden County is served by the Camden County School District, which includes nine elementary schools, two middle schools, and Camden County High School, the county's only public high school.

=== Higher education ===
The College of Coastal Georgia Camden Center opened in May 2004. The 101,000 square foot facility includes a 270-seat auditorium, classrooms, labs, library, teaching kitchen, and a veteran's study lounge.

Coastal Pines Technical College has two campuses in Camden County. The main Camden campus is located on Keith Dixon Way and the Cosmetology campus is located on The Lakes Blvd.

== Parks and recreation ==
=== Cumberland Island National Seashore ===
Cumberland Island National Seashore preserves most of Cumberland Island, Georgia's largest barrier island, including roughly 36,000 acres of beaches, dunes, maritime forest, and marsh, with about 9,886 acres designated as the Cumberland Island Wilderness. Congress authorized the national seashore in 1972; it is accessible only by boat, with a National Park Service ferry departing from St. Marys. The island is known for its feral horse herd, undeveloped beaches, and the ruins of the Carnegie family's Dungeness estate.

Visitation has been capped at roughly 300 people a day arriving by ferry since the National Park Service's 1984 general management plan; the seashore recorded about 64,700 visitors in 2024. In early 2026, the Park Service proposed raising the daily cap to about 700 visitors under a new visitor use management plan, drawing opposition from conservation groups including Wild Cumberland and the Georgia Conservancy.

=== Crooked River State Park ===
Crooked River State Park is a 500-acre state park on the Crooked River near St. Marys, adjacent to Naval Submarine Base Kings Bay and a short drive from the Cumberland Island ferry dock. Established in 1985, the park offers camping, cottages, hiking and nature trails, a boat ramp, and a kayak trail through the surrounding maritime forest and salt marsh.

=== Local parks and recreation ===
Local community parks in Camden County are maintained by the county government and by the cities of Kingsland, St. Marys, and Woodbine. Recreation programs are offered through the Camden County Public Service Authority (PSA).

==== County parks ====
The Camden County Board of Commissioners oversees county parks, most of which are located in unincorporated areas of Camden County, though some are situated within municipal limits.

===== Sugar Mill Ruins =====
Sugar Mill Ruins, also known as McIntosh Sugarworks, encompasses 69.18 acres in St. Marys. The site is a notable example of tabby concrete architecture and was added to the National Register of Historic Places on April 2, 1992.

== Politics ==
As of the 2020s, Camden County is a Republican stronghold, voting 67% for Donald Trump in 2024. The county has not voted Democratic since 1980, when the Democratic nominee was Georgia native Jimmy Carter.

For elections to the United States House of Representatives, Camden County is part of Georgia's 1st congressional district, currently represented by Buddy Carter. For elections to the Georgia State Senate, Camden County is part of District 3. For elections to the Georgia House of Representatives, Camden County is covered by district 180.

United States presidential election results for Camden County, Georgia
| Year | Republican | | Democratic | | Third party(ies) | |
| Year | No. | % | No. | % | No. | % |
|---|---|---|---|---|---|---|
| 1912 | 2 | 0.82% | 238 | 97.94% | 3 | 1.23% |
| 1916 | 4 | 1.54% | 251 | 96.91% | 4 | 1.54% |
| 1920 | 14 | 8.43% | 152 | 91.57% | 0 | 0.00% |
| 1924 | 1 | 0.57% | 172 | 98.29% | 2 | 1.14% |
| 1928 | 267 | 49.35% | 274 | 50.65% | 0 | 0.00% |
| 1932 | 49 | 10.45% | 417 | 88.91% | 3 | 0.64% |
| 1936 | 53 | 9.28% | 515 | 90.19% | 3 | 0.53% |
| 1940 | 60 | 9.60% | 564 | 90.24% | 1 | 0.16% |
| 1944 | 76 | 12.03% | 556 | 87.97% | 0 | 0.00% |
| 1948 | 208 | 19.17% | 552 | 50.88% | 325 | 29.95% |
| 1952 | 619 | 32.51% | 1,285 | 67.49% | 0 | 0.00% |
| 1956 | 1,014 | 46.26% | 1,178 | 53.74% | 0 | 0.00% |
| 1960 | 950 | 41.83% | 1,321 | 58.17% | 0 | 0.00% |
| 1964 | 1,802 | 51.56% | 1,693 | 48.44% | 0 | 0.00% |
| 1968 | 751 | 19.33% | 1,146 | 29.50% | 1,988 | 51.17% |
| 1972 | 2,380 | 75.97% | 753 | 24.03% | 0 | 0.00% |
| 1976 | 995 | 25.15% | 2,962 | 74.85% | 0 | 0.00% |
| 1980 | 1,439 | 32.39% | 2,924 | 65.81% | 80 | 1.80% |
| 1984 | 2,841 | 56.76% | 2,164 | 43.24% | 0 | 0.00% |
| 1988 | 2,913 | 57.68% | 2,090 | 41.39% | 47 | 0.93% |
| 1992 | 3,517 | 46.45% | 2,952 | 38.99% | 1,103 | 14.57% |
| 1996 | 4,222 | 49.75% | 3,644 | 42.94% | 620 | 7.31% |
| 2000 | 6,371 | 62.96% | 3,636 | 35.93% | 112 | 1.11% |
| 2004 | 9,488 | 66.85% | 4,637 | 32.67% | 68 | 0.48% |
| 2008 | 10,502 | 61.39% | 6,482 | 37.89% | 124 | 0.72% |
| 2012 | 11,343 | 62.84% | 6,377 | 35.33% | 330 | 1.83% |
| 2016 | 12,310 | 64.56% | 5,930 | 31.10% | 829 | 4.35% |
| 2020 | 15,249 | 64.35% | 7,967 | 33.62% | 482 | 2.03% |
| 2024 | 17,819 | 67.51% | 8,405 | 31.85% | 169 | 0.64% |

United States Senate election results for Camden County, Georgia2
| Year | Republican | | Democratic | | Third party(ies) | |
| Year | No. | % | No. | % | No. | % |
|---|---|---|---|---|---|---|
| 2020 | 14,987 | 64.19% | 7,467 | 31.98% | 895 | 3.83% |
| 2021 | 13,015 | 65.50% | 6,856 | 34.50% | 0 | 0.00% |

United States Senate election results for Camden County, Georgia3
| Year | Republican | | Democratic | | Third party(ies) | |
| Year | No. | % | No. | % | No. | % |
|---|---|---|---|---|---|---|
| 2020 | 6,631 | 29.32% | 2,967 | 13.12% | 13,019 | 57.56% |
| 2021 | 13,063 | 65.74% | 6,807 | 34.26% | 0 | 0.00% |
| 2022 | 11,698 | 65.45% | 5,758 | 32.22% | 417 | 2.33% |
| 2022 | 10,823 | 65.88% | 5,605 | 34.12% | 0 | 0.00% |

Georgia Gubernatorial election results for Camden County
| Year | Republican | | Democratic | | Third party(ies) | |
| Year | No. | % | No. | % | No. | % |
|---|---|---|---|---|---|---|
| 2022 | 12,494 | 69.62% | 5,264 | 29.33% | 187 | 1.04% |

== Notable people ==
- Duncan Lamont Clinch: After serving in the Seminole Wars, partially in Camden County, Clinch retired to planting near Jefferson on the Satilla River, and later began his political career.
- Jarrad Davis: Former linebacker for the Camden County Wildcats, the University of Florida, and current linebacker for the Detroit Lions
- Charles Rinaldo Floyd (1797–1845): led the first U.S. campaign into the Okefenoke Swamp during the Seminole Wars. The Floyds were the largest planting family in Camden County.
- John Floyd (October 3, 1769 – June 24, 1839): was an American politician and brigadier general in the First Brigade of Georgia Militia. He was a member of the Georgia House of Representatives from 1820 to 1827, as well as the US House of Representatives from 1827 to 1829.
- Catherine Littlefield Greene: Wife of General Nathaniel Greene. Lived on Cumberland Island and built the county's largest antebellum home, Dungeness.
- William J. Hardee, Confederate general, born at Rural Felicity plantation in Camden County in 1815.
- Stump Mitchell: American football coach and former professional player. He served as head football coach at Morgan State University from 1996 to 1998 and Southern University from 2010 to 2012, compiling an overall college football record of 14–42. Mitchell played collegiately at The Citadel and thereafter was drafted by the St. Louis Cardinals of the National Football League (NFL). He was a running back and return specialist for the Cardinals from 1981 to 1989. His football career began at Camden County High School.
- Micah Morris: Former Offensive Lineman for the Camden County Wildcats and the University of Georgia. He was selected by the Philadelphia Eagles in the 2026 NFL Draft with the 207th pick in the sixth round.
- Alicia Patterson: Founder and editor of Newsday. While not from Camden County by birth, her remains are interred at her private hunting lodge in Kingsland.
- James Seagrove: appointed Creek Indian Agent by the federal government and Superintendent of Creek Indian Affairs in 1789. Also a local trader associated with Trader's Hill and founder of St. Marys.
- Ryan Seymour: American football offensive guard for the New York Giants of the National Football League (NFL). He was drafted by the Seattle Seahawks in the seventh round of the 2013 NFL draft, and has also played for the San Francisco 49ers and Cleveland Browns. He played college football for Vanderbilt.
- Thomas Buckingham Smith: Born on Cumberland Island in 1810, Smith was a diplomat, antiquarian, and scholar. Notable Spanish translator and author of works on southern Native Americans.
- Jason Spencer: Republican State Representative for district 180 in the Georgia House of Representatives from 2011 to 2018.
- Travis Taylor: American former college and professional football player who was a wide receiver in the National Football league (NFL) for eight seasons during the 2000s. Taylor played college football for the University of Florida. A first-round pick in the 2000 NFL draft, he played professionally for the Baltimore Ravens, Minnesota Vikings, Oakland Raiders and St. Louis Rams.

== See also ==
- National Register of Historic Places listings in Camden County, Georgia
