= Tina Cornely =

American philanthropist

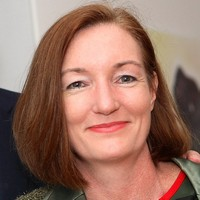
- Born: Sabina Louise Cornely; St. Marys, Georgia
- Occupations: Founder & CEO of Bridging Humanity
- Website: Bridging Humanity

Tina Cornely is an American philanthropist and founder of the non-profit organization Bridging Humanity. Cornely is the former Director of Technology of the Solomon R. Guggenheim Museum and former Operations Director of the Miami Art Museum.

== Early life and education ==
Cornely was born in St. Marys, Georgia. At the age of 10, she moved with her family to Honduras, where her father had a car dealership and restaurant. Cornely attributes her time in Honduras to her interest in repurposing items others have discarded. Cornely was educated in Honduras, Switzerland and the United States, and holds a teaching degree in French. She started her technology career in the early 1980s as a teacher at the University of Miami where she taught for 16 years.

== Career ==
Cornely is the former Director of Technology of the Solomon R. Guggenheim Museum and former Operations Director of the Miami Art Museum. In June 2012, Cornely founded Bridging Humanity, a registered United States based 501c3, which addresses issues surrounding poverty and environmental initiatives. Bridging Humanity has conducted humanitarian efforts in Florida, Haiti, Dominican Republic, Mexico, Guatemala, Honduras, Nicaragua, Mali, Uganda, Nepal, Jamaica and Borneo. She dedicates her time teaching people how to become eco-friendly and self-sufficient by repurposing trash and following her 9 steps to eradicate poverty.
