= Camden County School District =

Public school district in Georgia, United States

Camden County Schools

Address
- 311 South East Street Kingsland, Camden County, Georgia, 31548; United States
- Coordinates: 30.791827°N 81.684444°W

District information
- Grades: Pre-K–12
- Superintendent: Dr. Tracolya Green
- Accreditations: Cognia (SACS CASI); Georgia Accrediting Commission

Students and staff
- Enrollment: 9,754
- Faculty: 673.50 (FTE)

Other information
- Website: www.camden.k12.ga.us

The Camden County School District (operating commercially as Camden County Schools) is a public school district based in Kingsland, Georgia, United States. It serves all public school students residing within Camden County, including the municipalities of Kingsland, St. Marys, and Woodbine, alongside outlying residential communities such as Kings Bay Base, Waverly, and White Oak.

The district is governed by an elected five-member Board of Education and administered by an appointed superintendent. As of the 2025–2026 academic year, the system operates twelve traditional campuses and multiple specialized alternative education facilities, educating approximately 9,754 students.

== History ==
Public education in Camden County expanded significantly through consolidation and regional demographic shifts across the 20th century. During the era of racial segregation in the American South, educational resources for African-American children were disproportionately limited. In 1921, local educator Matilda Harris partnered with the rural school building program of the Rosenwald Fund to establish the Kinlaw Rosenwald School outside Kingsland, raising capital from black citizens, white neighbors, and county allocations to construct a state-of-the-art four-room schoolhouse. The school integrated into the consolidated county system in 1954, and Harris later became the namesake of Matilda Harris Elementary School.

Prior to the late 1970s, Camden County Schools operated as a rural system consisting of only three elementary campuses and one central high school. Following the July 1978 commissioning and subsequent 1980 Atlantic Fleet expansion of the neighboring Naval Submarine Base Kings Bay, the local population experienced an unprecedented boom. To accommodate the influx of dependents belonging to the Trident nuclear submarine fleet, the school district executed an aggressive long-term infrastructure plan, eventually scaling up to its contemporary layout of nine elementary campuses, two middle schools, and a heavily expanded comprehensive high school infrastructure.

== Governance ==
The Camden County School District is structured under the authority of the Camden County Board of Education. The board functions as a legislative body consisting of five non-partisan members elected from geographic districts to staggered four-year terms. The board is responsible for formulating local educational policies, managing the system's capital budgets, and appointing the superintendent. As of 2026, the board leadership consists of:

- Jonathon Blount – Chairman (District 4)
- Allison Murray – Vice-Chairman (District 2)
- Jason Chance (District 1)
- Melissa Hodge (District 3)
- Amy Melton (District 5)

Operational execution is led by the Superintendent of Schools. Dr. Tracolya Green assumes this role, following a contract extension approved by the Board of Education in October 2025 to secure her administrative leadership into the late 2020s.

== Student Body and Performance ==
The district's student body reflects a mix of permanent regional households and transient military families stationed at NSB Kings Bay. Demographically, the district employs roughly 673 full-time equivalent classroom teachers, yielding an average student-to-teacher ratio of approximately 14.5:1.

Camden County Schools consistently records academic metrics that outpace state averages across Georgia. For the 2024–2025 academic monitoring cycle, Camden County High School registered a four-year cohort graduation rate of 96.2%. This metric tracked nearly ten percentage points above the broader Georgia state graduation baseline of 87.2%.

== Schools ==
The Camden County School District operates nine elementary schools, two middle schools, and one comprehensive high school.

=== Elementary schools ===
- Crooked River Elementary School (St. Marys)
- David L. Rainer Elementary School (Kingsland)
- Kingsland Elementary School (Kingsland)
- Mamie Lou Gross Elementary School (Woodbine)
- Mary Lee Clark Elementary School (St. Marys)
- Matilda Harris Elementary School (Kingsland)
- St. Marys Elementary School (St. Marys)
- Sugarmill Elementary School (St. Marys)
- Woodbine Elementary School (Woodbine)

=== Middle schools ===
- Camden Middle School (Kingsland)
- St. Marys Middle School (St. Marys)

=== High school ===
- Camden County High School (Kingsland)

=== Alternative and partner programs ===
The district handles alternative pathways, credit recovery, and specialized behavioral/academic interventions through regional secondary facility partners:

- Camden Learning Center (housing the Camden Success Academy)
- Camden IDEB Program
- Coastal Plains Charter High School (Camden Campus)
