= St. Marys, Georgia =

City in Georgia, US

- City
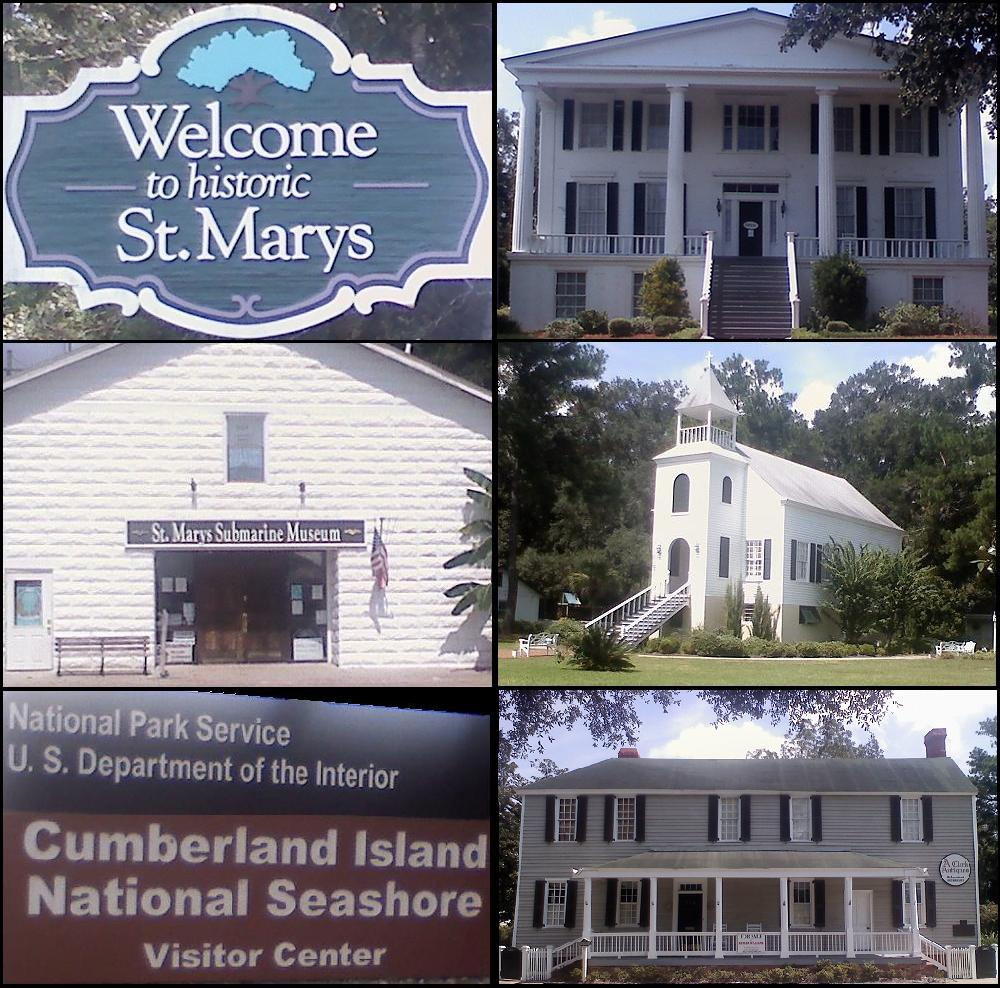

- Seal

- Location in Camden County and the state of Georgia
- Coordinates: 30°43′14″N 81°32′55″W
- Country: United States of America
- State: Georgia
- County: Camden
- Town charter signed: November 20, 1787
- Established by state legislature: December 5, 1792
- Incorporated: November 1802

Government
  - Mayor: Greg Lockhart

Area
  - Total: 25.00 sq mi (64.74 km^{2})
  - Land: 22.82 sq mi (59.11 km^{2})
  - Water: 2.17 sq mi (5.63 km^{2})
- Elevation: 9.8 ft (3 m)

Population (2020)
  - Total: 18,256
  - Estimate (2025): 20,546
  - Density: 799.9/sq mi (308.85/km^{2})
- Time zone: UTC-5 (Eastern (EST))
  - Summer (DST): UTC-4 (EDT)
- ZIP Code: 31558
- Area code: Area code 912
- FIPS code: 13-67984
- Website: www.stmarysga.gov

St. Marys is a city in Camden County, Georgia, United States, located on the southern border of Camden County on the St. Marys River. It had a population of 18,256 at the 2020 census, up from 17,121 at the 2010 census. It is part of the Kingsland, Georgia Micropolitan Statistical Area. The Florida border is just to the south across the river, Cumberland Island National Seashore is to the northeast, and Kingsland, Georgia, is to the west. Jacksonville, Florida, is 38 miles south, and Savannah, Georgia, is 110 miles north.

St. Marys is the ferry departure point for the passenger ferry to Cumberland Island. Other attractions include the St. Marys Submarine Museum, Crooked River State Park, the history walk, and the waterfront park. It is bordered by Kings Bay Naval Submarine Base, home port for several Ohio-class submarines. The city hosts annual Mardi Gras events, an Independence Day Festival, St. Marys Seafood Festival and a Music in the Park Series.

The area was first explored in the mid-16th century by Spanish expeditions as part of the settlement of Spanish Florida. Through the decades, it also came under the colonial influence of Great Britain and finally the United States.

== History ==
The St. Marys river area was first explored by Spanish expeditions in the mid 16th century as part of the settlement of Spanish Florida, with nearby St. Augustine as the established capital. The original Spanish settlement was founded in 1566, making this the second-oldest continuously inhabited European-established settlement in what became the contiguous United States. Settlement for colonial Georgians became legal after the Treaty of Paris in 1763, when Britain exchanged some territory with Spain after defeating France in the Seven Years' War.

Following independence in the American Revolutionary War, local inhabitants of Camden County gathered on Cumberland Island and signed a charter for "a town on the St. Marys" on November 20, 1787. There were twenty charter members, who each received four town lots and one marsh lot (outside the boundary of the town on the east side in the marshes); each lot was 4 acres (1.6 ha) square, with the total town area being 2,041 acres (826 ha). These twenty city founders are named on an historical marker in downtown St. Marys: Isaac Wheeler, William Norris, Nathaniel Ashley, William Ashley, Lodowick Ashley, James Seagrove, James Finley, John Fleming, Robert Seagrove, Henry Osborne, Thomas Norris, Jacob Weed, John Alexander, Langley Bryant, Jonathan Bartlett, Stephen Conyers, William Ready, Prentis Gallup, Simeon Dillingham and Richard Cole.

The original boundaries of the town correspond to the modern waterfront, Bartlett Street, North Street, and a block east of Norris Street. There were two public town squares. However, in the original deed the town was unnamed, and for several years afterwards in public documents it was referred to as either St. Marys or St. Patrick's, and colloquially as simply "the New Town". Accounts differ regarding the origin of the name—some say it is named after the St. Marys River, while others say it comes from a seventeenth-century Spanish mission, Santa Maria, on nearby Amelia Island, Florida. St. Marys was recognized by an act of the Georgia legislature on December 5, 1792, with the result of incorporation in November 1802. The town was renamed the City of St. Marys by an 1858 act of the Georgia General Assembly.

Oak Grove Cemetery is included in the St. Marys Historic District and was laid outside the western border of St. Marys during its founding in 1787.

On June 29, 1796, the Treaty of Colerain was signed just up the river from St Marys between the United States and the Creek Nation, the indigenous inhabitants of this territory. St. Marys town founder Langley Bryant served as the official interpreter between the Creek Indians and the United States.

St. Marys was made a United States port of entry by act of the U.S. Congress March 2, 1799. The first Collector was James Seagrove. During the antebellum period, Archibald Clark served as the U.S. Customs Collector from 1807 until his death in 1848.

After the Act Prohibiting Importation of Slaves took effect in 1808, St. Marys became, along with Spanish Amelia Island, a center for smuggling, especially during the period between 1812 and 1819 when various rebel groups held Amelia Island.

During the War of 1812, the Battle of Fort Peter occurred near the town, at the fort on Point Peter along the St. Marys River. The British captured the fort and the town and occupied it for about a month.

The United States Navy bombarded the town's shoreside buildings during the American Civil War.

St. Marys served as Camden County's seat of government from 1869 until 1923.

== Geography ==
St. Marys is located along the southern border of Camden County on the north bank of the St. Marys River. The state of Florida is to the south, across the river. The city of Kingsland borders St. Marys to the west.

According to the United States Census Bureau, St. Marys has a total area of 24.9 square miles (64.5 km^{2}), of which 22.5 square miles (58.3 km^{2}) is land and 2.4 square miles (6.2 km^{2}), or 9.57%, is water.

=== Climate ===
St. Marys has a humid subtropical climate (Cfa) with long, hot summers and short, mild winters.

Climate data for St. Marys, Georgia
Month	Jan	Feb	Mar	Apr	May	Jun	Jul	Aug	Sep	Oct	Nov	Dec	Year
Record high °F (°C)	88 (31)	91 (33)	92 (33)	94 (34)	100 (38)	104 (40)	102 (39)	102 (39)	99 (37)	96 (36)	93 (34)	85 (29)	104 (40)
Mean daily maximum °F (°C)	63 (17)	66 (19)	71 (22)	77 (25)	83 (28)	88 (31)	91 (33)	89 (32)	86 (30)	79 (26)	72 (22)	65 (18)	78 (26)
Mean daily minimum °F (°C)	44 (7)	47 (8)	53 (12)	59 (15)	67 (19)	73 (23)	75 (24)	75 (24)	73 (23)	65 (18)	56 (13)	48 (9)	61 (16)
Record low °F (°C)	4 (−16)	20 (−7)	22 (−6)	37 (3)	40 (4)	51 (11)	63 (17)	61 (16)	52 (11)	39 (4)	24 (−4)	12 (−11)	4 (−16)
Average precipitation inches (mm)	3.42 (87)	3.32 (84)	3.92 (100)	2.82 (72)	2.31 (59)	5.27 (134)	5.52 (140)	5.82 (148)	6.91 (176)	4.59 (117)	2.08 (53)	2.95 (75)	48.93 (1,245)

== Government ==
St. Marys operates under a council–manager government, with an elected mayor and six-member city council that sets policy and appoints a city manager to oversee day-to-day administration. The council meets on the first and third Monday of each month.

- Mayor Greg Lockhart
- Council Member Post 1 - Artie Jones
- Council Member Post 2 - Steven Conner
- Council Member Post 3 - Chad Ingram
- Council Member Post 4 - Jeremy Nascimento
- Council Member Post 5 - Allen Rassi, Jr.
- Council Member Post 6 - Lynn Keene

== Economy ==
For much of the 20th century, St. Marys' economy was dominated by the Gilman Paper Company, which opened a kraft paper mill in the city in 1941 and grew into one of the largest privately held paper companies in the United States. The mill was sold to the Durango Paper Company in 1999 and closed in 2002, eliminating roughly 900 jobs. As of early 2026, the roughly 700-acre former mill site was controlled by the Camden County Joint Development Authority after a planned mixed-use redevelopment, Cumberland Inlet, stalled in bankruptcy proceedings.

The city's largest current employer is the nearby Naval Submarine Base Kings Bay, homeport of the U.S. Navy's Atlantic Ohio-class ballistic-missile submarine fleet, which employed more than 9,000 military and civilian personnel as of the early 2000s. Heritage tourism and ecotourism, centered on the historic downtown and the city's role as the ferry departure point for Cumberland Island National Seashore, also form a significant part of the local economy.

== Education ==
St. Marys is served by the Camden County School District. Schools located within the city include St. Marys Elementary School, Mary Lee Clark Elementary School, Crooked River Elementary School, and St. Marys Middle School.

== Demographics ==
Historical population
Census	Pop.	Note	%±
1810	268		—
1820	771		187.7%
1840	206		—
1860	650		—
1870	702		8.0%
1890	575		—
1900	529		−8.0%
1910	691		30.6%
1920	824		19.2%
1930	732		−11.2%
1940	733		0.1%
1950	1,348		83.9%
1960	3,272		142.7%
1970	3,408		4.2%
1980	3,596		5.5%
1990	8,187		127.7%
2000	13,761		68.1%
2010	17,121		24.4%
2020	18,256		6.6%
2025 (est.)	20,546	▲	12.5%
U.S. Decennial Census; 1850–1870 1870–1880; 1890–1910 1920–1930; 1940 1950 1960; 1970 1980 1990; 2000 2010; 2025

=== 2020 census ===
As of the 2020 census, St. Marys had a population of 18,256. The median age was 35.6 years. 23.9% of residents were under the age of 18 and 16.5% of residents were 65 years of age or older. For every 100 females there were 95.1 males, and for every 100 females age 18 and over there were 93.5 males age 18 and over.

92.8% of residents lived in urban areas, while 7.2% lived in rural areas.

There were 7,242 households in St. Marys, of which 31.4% had children under the age of 18 living in them. Of all households, 51.7% were married-couple households, 17.5% were households with a male householder and no spouse or partner present, and 24.7% were households with a female householder and no spouse or partner present. About 24.7% of all households were made up of individuals and 8.2% had someone living alone who was 65 years of age or older.

There were 7,787 housing units, of which 7.0% were vacant. The homeowner vacancy rate was 1.4% and the rental vacancy rate was 6.4%.

Racial composition as of the 2020 census
Race	Number	Percent
White	12,941	70.9%
Black or African American	3,060	16.8%
American Indian and Alaska Native	95	0.5%
Asian	261	1.4%
Native Hawaiian and Other Pacific Islander	15	0.1%
Some other race	388	2.1%
Two or more races	1,496	8.2%
Hispanic or Latino (of any race)	1,292	7.1%

== Transportation ==
Georgia State Route 40 runs through St. Marys, connecting the city to Interstate 95 at Kingsland and terminating at Church Street in the city's downtown. The St. Marys Railroad, an 11-mile short-line freight railroad dating to 1906, connects the city to Kingsland and also serves Naval Submarine Base Kings Bay via a spur track. The city's former general-aviation facility, St. Marys Airport, was permanently closed on July 14, 2017, due to security concerns regarding the nearby Naval Submarine Base Kings Bay.

== Notable people ==
- Tina Cornely, philanthropist
- Stump Mitchell, American football coach and former player
- Christopher Sharpless, bobsledder
- Tyrone Jones, Canadian Football League linebacker, two-time Grey Cup champion

== See also ==
- Cumberland Island
- Duck House
- Orange Hall (St. Marys, Georgia)
- List of county seats in Georgia (U.S. state)
