= Waverly, Georgia =

Waverly
- Census-designated place Unincorporated community
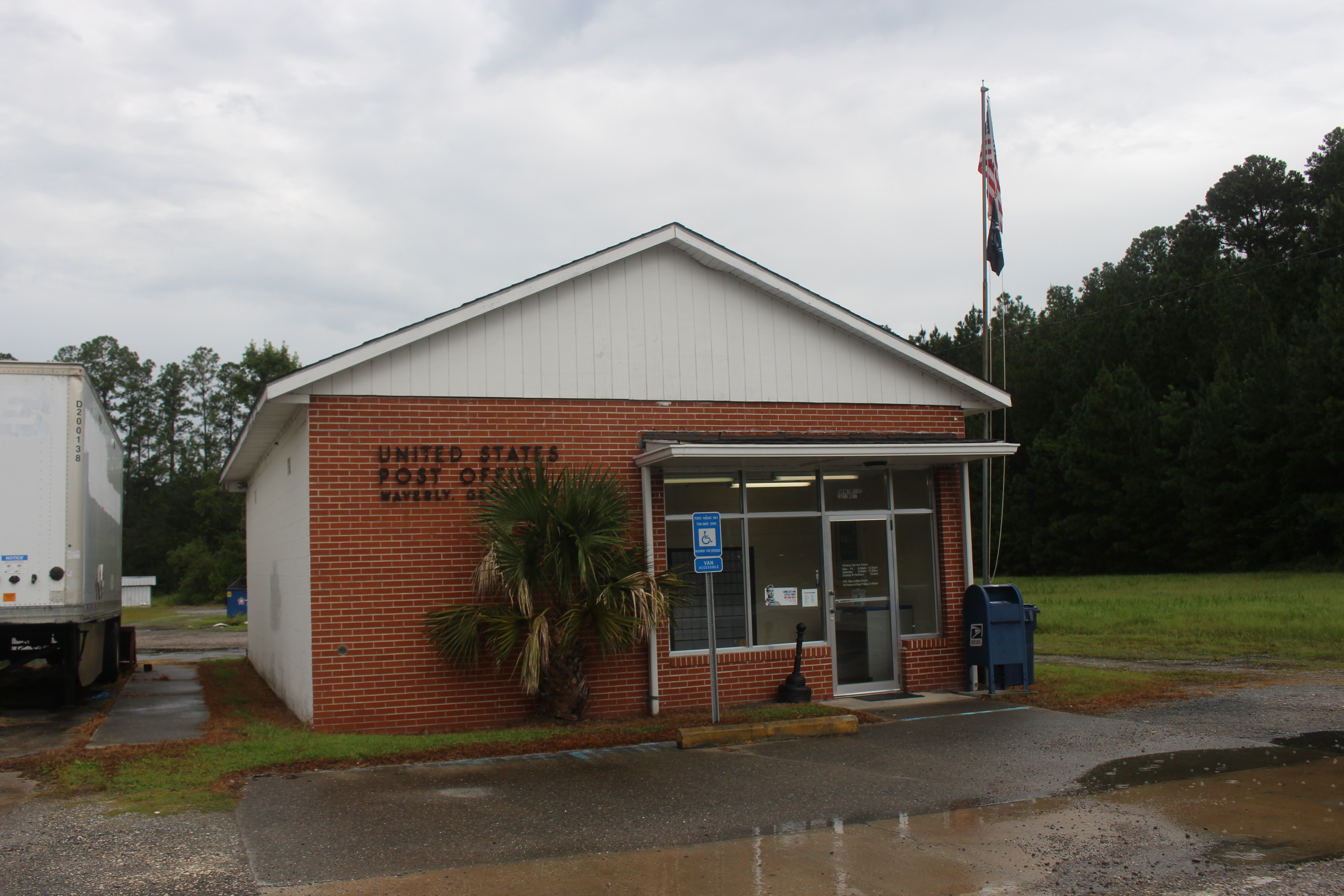
- Waverly Post Office

- Location of Waverly in the State of Georgia Waverly (the United States)
- Coordinates: 31°05′38″N 81°43′33″W
- Country: United States
- State: Georgia
- County: Camden

Area
  - Total: 5.46 sq mi (14.15 km^{2})
  - Land: 5.43 sq mi (14.07 km^{2})
  - Water: 0.031 sq mi (0.08 km^{2})
- Elevation: 26 ft (8 m)

Population (2020)
  - Total: 281
  - Density: 51.7/sq mi (20.0/km^{2})
- Time zone: UTC−5 (Eastern (EST))
  - Summer (DST): UTC−4 (EDT)
- ZIP Code: 31565
- Area code: 912
- FIPS code: 13-80816
- GNIS feature ID: 0333375

Waverly is an unincorporated community and census-designated place (CDP) in Camden County, in the U.S. state of Georgia. It forms part of the Brunswick Metropolitan Statistical Area and occupies the northeastern corner of the county.

Waverly was first designated as a CDP prior to the 2020 census, at which time it recorded an official population of 281.

== History ==
The area comprising modern-day Waverly contains archaeological remnants of extensive historic rice fields, canals, dikes, and ditches that operated from the 1760s through the late 1800s, historically associated with the antebellum Middleton-Waverly Plantation.

Decades after the collapse of the plantation economy, a post office called Waverly was established in 1894 to service the developing rural community and local rail corridor. The community derives its name from Sir Walter Scott's historical Waverley novels.

== Geography ==
According to the United States Census Bureau, the Waverly CDP has a total area of 5.46 square miles (14.14 km^{2}), of which 5.43 square miles (14.06 km^{2}) is land and 0.03 square miles (0.08 km^{2}), or 0.54%, is water. The landscape is characterized by maritime flatwoods, low-lying coastal plains, and tidal salt marshes associated with nearby Waverly Creek.

== Transportation ==
The CDP is positioned along major regional transit routes. The principal commercial and residential artery through the community is U.S. Route 17 (concurrent with Georgia State Route 25), which runs north-south and connects Waverly to Woodbine to the south and Glynn County to the north. Interstate 95 passes just west of the community limits, providing long-distance interstate access via Exit 26.

== Demographics ==
Historical population
Census	Pop.	Note	%±
2020	281		—
U.S. Decennial Census; 2020

=== 2020 census ===
Waverly CDP, Georgia – Racial and ethnic composition Note: the US Census treats Hispanic/Latino as an ethnic category. This table excludes Latinos from the racial categories and assigns them to a separate category. Hispanics/Latinos may be of any race.
Race / Ethnicity (NH = Non-Hispanic)	Pop 2020	% 2020
White alone (NH)	251	89.32%
Black or African American alone (NH)	19	6.76%
Native American or Alaska Native alone (NH)	0	0.00%
Asian alone (NH)	0	0.00%
Pacific Islander alone (NH)	0	0.00%
Other race alone (NH)	0	0.00%
Mixed race or Multiracial (NH)	7	2.49%
Hispanic or Latino (any race)	4	1.42%
Total	281	100.00%
