= Woodbine, Georgia =

- City
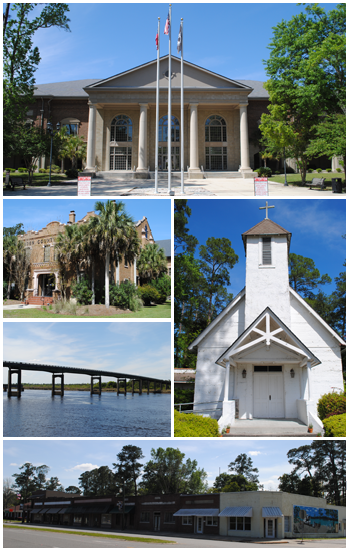
- Top, left to right: Camden County Courthouse, Old Camden County Courthouse, Satilla River, St. Mark's Episcopal Church, Woodbine Historic District

- Seal Logo
- Motto: "Cherish Yesterday, Embrace Today, Prepare for Tomorrow"
- Location in Camden County and the state of Georgia
- Coordinates: 30°57′43″N 81°43′12″W
- Country: United States
- State: Georgia
- County: Camden
- Settled: 1893
- Incorporated (town): August 13, 1908
- Incorporated (city): 1953

Government
  - Type: Mayor–council
  - Mayor: Kizzi Knight

Area
  - Total: 2.61 sq mi (6.76 km^{2})
  - Land: 2.54 sq mi (6.59 km^{2})
  - Water: 0.066 sq mi (0.17 km^{2})
- Elevation: 13 ft (4 m)

Population (2020)
  - Total: 1,062
  - Density: 418/sq mi (161.2/km^{2})
- Time zone: UTC-5 (Eastern (EST))
  - Summer (DST): UTC-4 (EDT)
- ZIP code: 31569
- Area code: 912
- FIPS code: 13-83868
- GNIS feature ID: 0325526
- Website: woodbinegeorgia.net

Woodbine is a city in and the county seat of Camden County, Georgia, United States, an original county established when the state constitution was adopted in 1777. The population was 1,062 at the 2020 census, down from 1,412 at the 2010 census. It is part of the Kingsland, Georgia Micropolitan Statistical Area.

The East Coast Greenway, a 3,000 mile long system of trails connecting Maine to Florida, runs along the Woodbine Riverwalk. Woodbine is promoted as the home of "Georgia's Official Crawfish Festival," an annual event held on the fourth Saturday of April since 1985.

== History ==
Records in 1765 show that John Brown, John McGillvary, William Molyneaux and William Trowin petitioned English authorities for 1,400 acres (570 ha) south of the Satilla River. They were granted the land named Pile's Bluff, which historians believe to be near Woodbine.

A tract of land was granted to Anton Cunning by the state in 1808. It became known as the Woodbine Plantation. Luke John Bailey purchased it in 1835 and held it through the Civil War, during which the house was burned by Union troops. James King Bedell acquired the property, constructed a new house, and restored the plantation. The railroad entered Camden County in 1893, and Bedell sold a right-of-way across his land, but required that the first rail community be named "Woodbine".

Woodbine was incorporated as a town on August 13, 1908, and the word is the common English name for the honeysuckle, Lonicera. The town grew more after the Atlantic Coastal Highway was constructed during 1927 and the county seat relocated there the following year. Woodbine re-incorporated as a city in 1953.

On the morning of February 3, 1971, the Thiokol Chemical Corporation, a factory (13 miles east of Woodbine) that made tripflares for soldiers fighting in Vietnam, exploded. Twenty-eight employees of the factory, predominantly Black women, were killed after a flame in a small building, according to court records, triggered a massive explosion. The blast blew pieces of the building almost a mile away, left more than 50 other people injured.

Spaceport Camden, a proposed commercial rocket-launch facility adjacent to the city, began limited development in 2014 but was cancelled in 2023 after the Georgia Supreme Court upheld a county referendum opposing it.

== Geography ==
The city is situated near the center of the county, which is located in the southeast corner of the state near the Florida border. It is located on the south bank of the Satilla River near the head of its tidal extent. U.S. Route 17 (Ocean Highway) passes through the center of the city, leading northeast 29 miles (47 km) to Brunswick and south 11 miles (18 km) to Kingsland. The city has extended its borders 2 miles (3 km) east along 10th Street to reach Interstate 95 at its Exit 14.

Woodbine is located at 30°57′43″N 81°43′12″W (30.961869, -81.720017).

According to the United States Census Bureau, the city has a total area of 2.61 square miles (6.76 km^{2}), of which 2.54 square miles (6.59 km^{2}) is land and 0.07 square miles (0.17 km^{2}), or 2.51%, is water.

=== Climate ===
Climate data for Woodbine, Georgia (1991–2020 normals, extremes 1998–present)
Month	Jan	Feb	Mar	Apr	May	Jun	Jul	Aug	Sep	Oct	Nov	Dec	Year
Record high °F (°C)	84 (29)	86 (30)	91 (33)	94 (34)	98 (37)	100 (38)	102 (39)	102 (39)	96 (36)	94 (34)	89 (32)	85 (29)	102 (39)
Mean daily maximum °F (°C)	62.6 (17.0)	65.9 (18.8)	71.9 (22.2)	77.7 (25.4)	83.7 (28.7)	88.2 (31.2)	90.9 (32.7)	89.2 (31.8)	85.3 (29.6)	78.6 (25.9)	70.4 (21.3)	64.5 (18.1)	77.4 (25.2)
Daily mean °F (°C)	50.3 (10.2)	53.7 (12.1)	59.3 (15.2)	65.2 (18.4)	72.3 (22.4)	78.2 (25.7)	80.9 (27.2)	80.2 (26.8)	76.4 (24.7)	68.0 (20.0)	59.0 (15.0)	53.0 (11.7)	66.4 (19.1)
Mean daily minimum °F (°C)	38.0 (3.3)	41.5 (5.3)	46.7 (8.2)	52.7 (11.5)	61.0 (16.1)	68.2 (20.1)	70.9 (21.6)	71.1 (21.7)	67.4 (19.7)	57.3 (14.1)	47.6 (8.7)	41.5 (5.3)	55.3 (12.9)
Record low °F (°C)	10 (−12)	10 (−12)	21 (−6)	22 (−6)	41 (5)	51 (11)	58 (14)	57 (14)	50 (10)	30 (−1)	24 (−4)	19 (−7)	10 (−12)
Average precipitation inches (mm)	3.61 (92)	3.67 (93)	3.58 (91)	3.52 (89)	3.92 (100)	6.20 (157)	5.51 (140)	7.76 (197)	6.70 (170)	4.74 (120)	2.33 (59)	3.04 (77)	54.58 (1,386)
Average precipitation days (≥ 0.01 in)	7.3	7.9	6.9	6.0	6.0	11.5	11.9	14.1	11.0	6.8	5.3	6.9	101.6
Source: NOAA

== Government ==
Woodbine operates under a mayor–council form of government, with an elected mayor and a four-member city council; day-to-day administrative duties are handled by a city clerk.

- Mayor Kizzi Knight
- Mayor Pro-Tem Louise Mitchell
- Councilor Rick Baird
- Councilor Phyllis Drummond
- Councilor C.C. Higginbotham, Jr.

== Economy ==
As the county seat, Woodbine is home to the Camden County Courthouse and other county government offices, which form a significant part of the local economy.

== Demographics ==
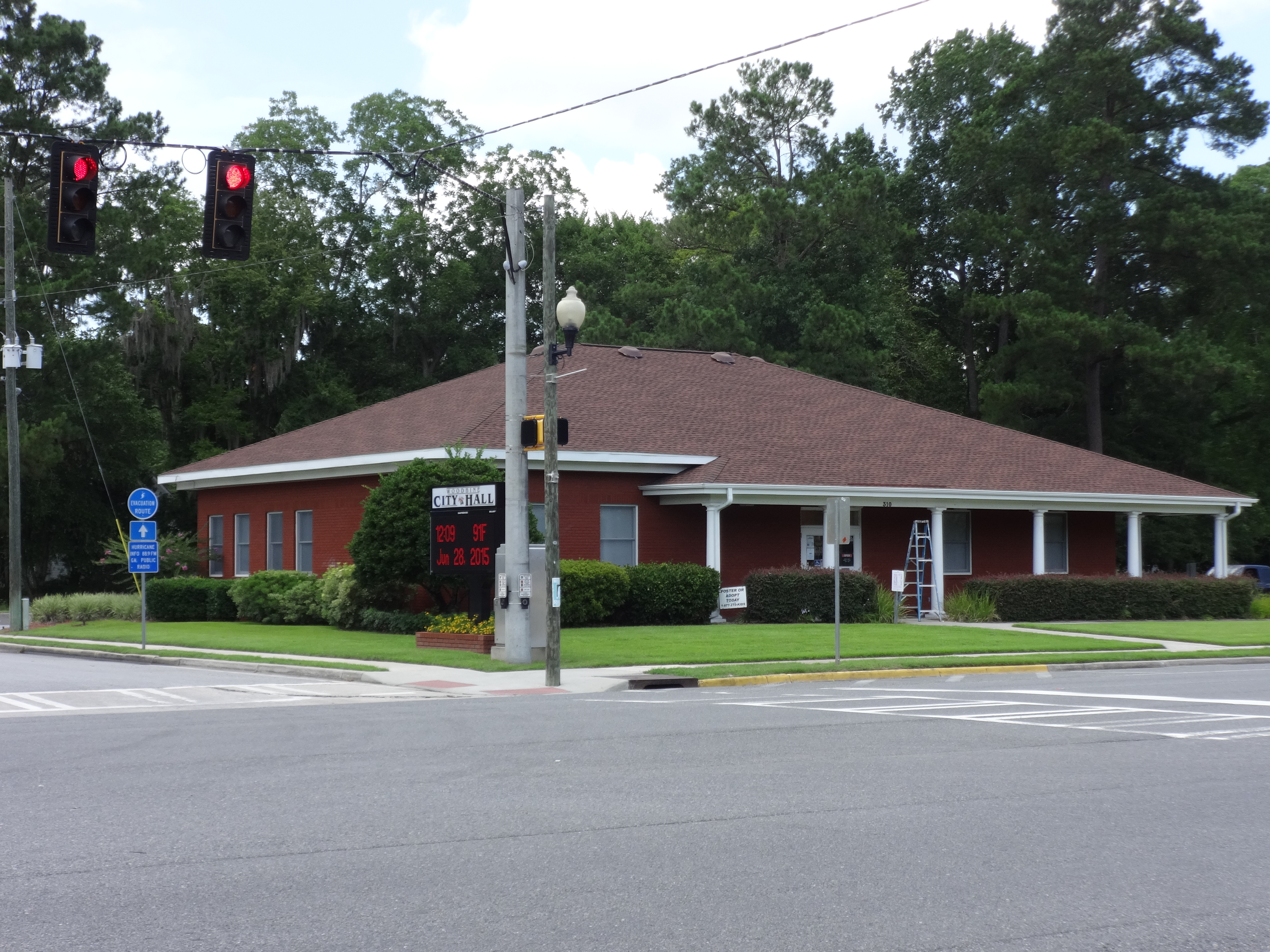
Woodbine City Hall

Historical population
Census	Pop.	Note	%±
1910	155		—
1920	172		11.0%
1930	335		94.8%
1940	373		11.3%
1950	750		101.1%
1960	845		12.7%
1970	1,002		18.6%
1980	910		−9.2%
1990	1,212		33.2%
2000	1,218		0.5%
2010	1,412		15.9%
2020	1,062		−24.8%
U.S. Decennial Census; 1850–1870 1870–1880; 1890–1910 1920–1930; 1940 1950 1960; 1970 1980 1990; 2000 2010

=== 2020 census ===
As of the 2020 census, Woodbine had a population of 1,062. The median age was 42.6 years. 24.2% of residents were under the age of 18 and 16.8% of residents were 65 years of age or older. For every 100 females there were 79.1 males, and for every 100 females age 18 and over there were 74.6 males age 18 and over.

0.0% of residents lived in urban areas, while 100.0% lived in rural areas.

There were 472 households in Woodbine, including 316 families, and 32.4% had children under the age of 18 living in them. Of all households, 35.8% were married-couple households, 16.3% were households with a male householder and no spouse or partner present, and 41.1% were households with a female householder and no spouse or partner present. About 31.8% of all households were made up of individuals and 9.9% had someone living alone who was 65 years of age or older.

There were 540 housing units, of which 12.6% were vacant. The homeowner vacancy rate was 2.1% and the rental vacancy rate was 8.0%.

Woodbine racial composition as of 2020
Race	Num.	Perc.
White (non-Hispanic)	606	57.06%
Black or African American (non-Hispanic)	385	36.25%
Native American	4	0.38%
Asian	7	0.66%
Pacific Islander	4	0.38%
Other/Mixed	44	4.14%
Hispanic or Latino	12	1.13%

== Education ==
Woodbine is served by the Camden County School District. Woodbine Elementary School, located within the city, serves the surrounding area.

== See also ==
- Woodbine Historic District (Woodbine, Georgia)
