= Kingsland, Georgia =

- City
- City of Kingsland
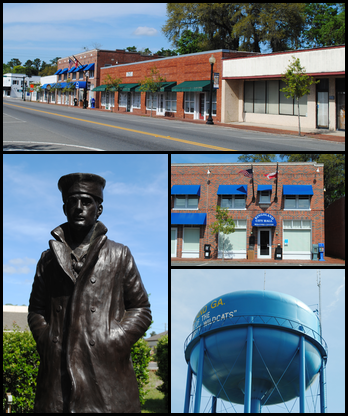
- Clockwise from top: Kingsland Commercial Historic District, Kingsland City Hall, municipal water tower, Lone Sailor statue at Veterans' Park

- Seal Logo
- Motto: "The City of Royal Treatment"
- Location in Camden County and the state of Georgia

- Location in Georgia Kingsland (the United States) Kingsland (North America)
- Coordinates: 30°47′41″N 81°40′18″W
- Country: United States
- State: Georgia (U.S. state)
- County: Camden
- Founded: 1894
- Incorporated: 1908
- Named for: William Henry King

Government
  - Type: Council–manager
  - Mayor: C. Grayson Day Jr.

Area
  - Total: 44.95 sq mi (116.43 km^{2})
  - Land: 44.74 sq mi (115.87 km^{2})
  - Water: 0.22 sq mi (0.56 km^{2})
- Elevation: 36 ft (11 m)

Population (2020)
  - Total: 18,337
  - Estimate (2025): 21,299
  - Density: 409.9/sq mi (158.26/km^{2})
- Time zone: UTC-5 (Eastern (EST))
  - Summer (DST): UTC-4 (EDT)
- ZIP codes: 31548
- Area code: 912
- FIPS code: 13-43640
- GNIS feature ID: 0316462
- Website: https://www.kingslandgeorgia.com/

Kingsland is a city in Camden County, Georgia, United States. The population was 18,337 at the 2020 census, up from 15,946 at the 2010 census. It is the principal city of the Kingsland, Georgia Micropolitan Statistical Area. As Kingsland is 3 miles from the Florida-Georgia border and 32 miles from Jacksonville, it is also a principal city of the Jacksonville—Kingsland—Palatka, Florida—Georgia Combined Statistical Area.

The Kingsland Commercial Historic District was added to the National Register of Historic Places on March 17, 1994. It includes the area surrounding South Lee Street between King Street and William Street. It hosts an annual Catfish Festival each November and is the location where the fan series Star Trek Continues was filmed.

== History ==
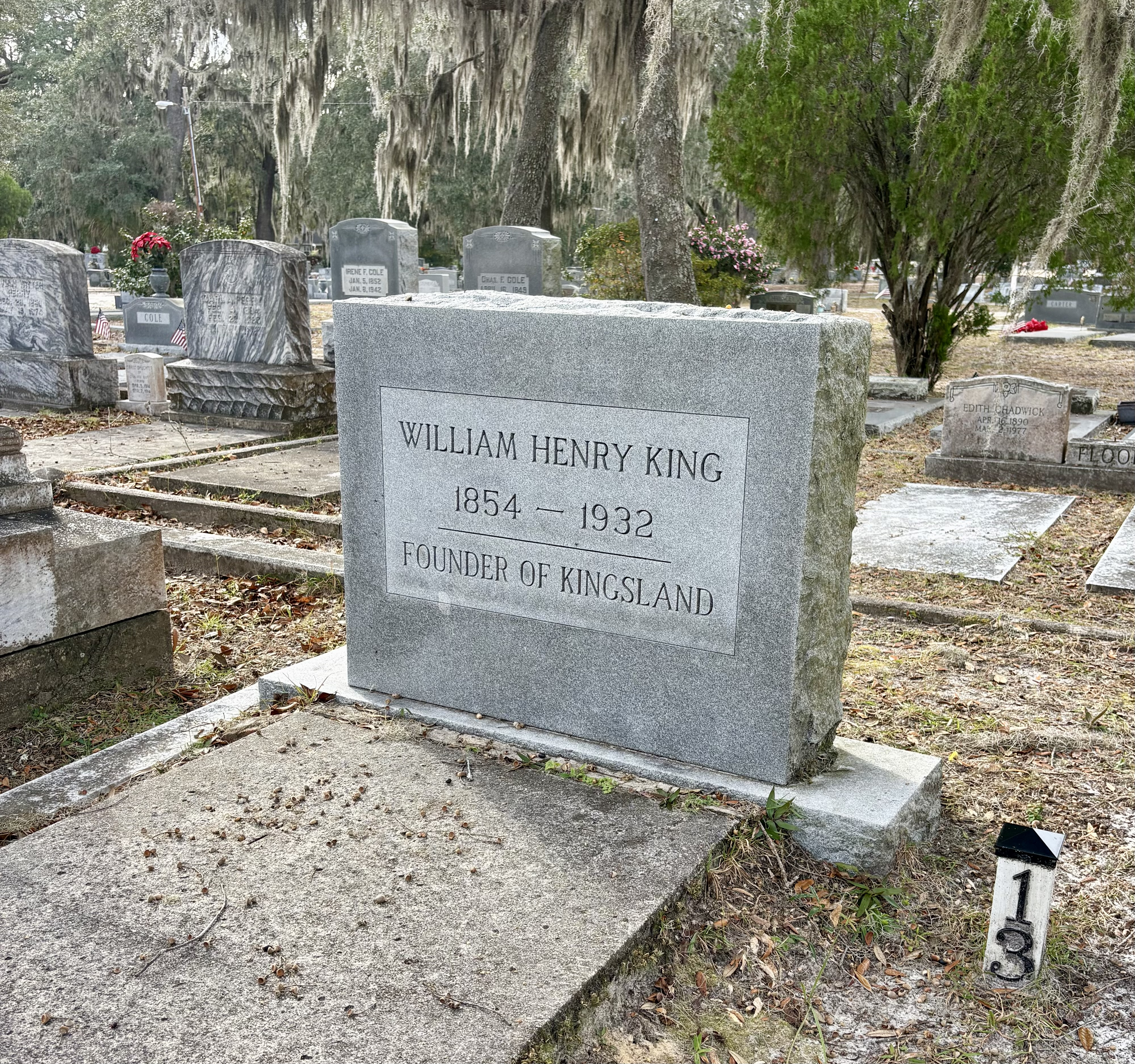
William Henry King gravesite, Oak Grove Cemetery, Saint Mary's, Georgia.

Kingsland traces its origin to the arrival of the Florida Central and Peninsular Railroad (a predecessor of CSX Transportation) on Christmas Day 1893, which passed through property owned by the King family; the surrounding settlement became known as "Kings Land." Kingsland was platted in 1894 when the railroad was extended to that point, and named after William Henry King, the original owner of the site. The city was incorporated in 1908.

The growth of nearby Naval Submarine Base Kings Bay, particularly after its 1980 designation as the Atlantic Fleet's homeport for Trident submarines, brought a sustained increase in population to Kingsland; the city established a planning and zoning department around 1985 to manage the resulting growth.

== Government ==
Kingsland operates under a council–manager government, with an elected mayor and four-member city council that sets policy and appoints a city manager to oversee day-to-day administration. Lee H. Spell has served as city manager since 2014.

- Mayor Dr. C. Grayson Day, Jr.
- Mayor Pro Tem Alex Blount
- Councilman Paul Chamberlin
- Councilwoman Kristy Chance
- Councilman Farran Fullilove

== Economy ==
Kingsland's economy is closely tied to nearby Naval Submarine Base Kings Bay, which draws a substantial share of the area's military, civilian, and contractor workforce. The city also functions as a regional retail and service hub for southern Camden County, with a commercial corridor concentrated along U.S. Route 17 and Interstate 95. Local workforce education is provided through the Camden Center, an extension campus of the College of Coastal Georgia, and an instructional site of Coastal Pines Technical College.

== Geography ==
Kingsland is in southernmost Camden County at 30°47′41″N 81°40′18″W (30.794612, -81.671720), just north of the Florida line. It is bordered by St. Marys to the east. Interstate 95 runs through the eastern part of the city, with access from three exits. U.S. Route 17, an older highway running parallel to I-95, passes through the center of Kingsland. Jacksonville, Florida, is 36 miles (58 km) to the south, and Brunswick is 34 miles (55 km) to the north.

According to the United States Census Bureau, Kingsland has a total area of 44.95 square miles (116.43 km^{2}), of which 44.74 square miles (115.87 km^{2}) is land and 0.22 square miles (0.56 km^{2}), or 0.48%, is water.

=== Climate ===
Kingsland experiences a humid subtropical climate with hot, humid summers and mild winters.

Climate data for Kingsland, Georgia
Month	Jan	Feb	Mar	Apr	May	Jun	Jul	Aug	Sep	Oct	Nov	Dec	Year
Mean daily maximum °F (°C)	63 (17)	66 (19)	73 (23)	79 (26)	84 (29)	89 (32)	91 (33)	90 (32)	86 (30)	80 (27)	72 (22)	66 (19)	78 (26)
Mean daily minimum °F (°C)	37 (3)	40 (4)	46 (8)	53 (12)	60 (16)	68 (20)	71 (22)	71 (22)	67 (19)	56 (13)	47 (8)	41 (5)	55 (13)
Average rainfall inches (mm)	2.86 (73)	2.44 (62)	1.65 (42)	5.67 (144)	1.07 (27)	4.47 (114)	6.26 (159)	9.13 (232)	6.19 (157)	1.11 (28)	3.94 (100)	1.93 (49)	46.72 (1,187)
Average rainy days	6	6	6	5	5	10	10	12	9	6	3	5	83
Average relative humidity (%)	82.3	77.2	84.2	83.6	78.1	80.4	83.7	84.9	89.2	86.6	89.4	88.2	84.0

== Demographics ==
Historical population
Census	Pop.	Note	%±
1910	190		—
1920	296		55.8%
1930	444		50.0%
1940	619		39.4%
1950	1,169		88.9%
1960	1,536		31.4%
1970	1,831		19.2%
1980	2,008		9.7%
1990	4,699		134.0%
2000	10,506		123.6%
2010	15,946		51.8%
2020	18,337		15.0%
2025 (est.)	21,299	▲	16.2%
U.S. Decennial Census; 1850-1870 1870-1880; 1890-1910 1920-1930; 1940 1950 1960; 1970 1980 1990; 2000 2010; 2025

=== 2020 census ===
As of the 2020 census, Kingsland had a population of 18,337 and 4,546 families residing in the city. The median age was 33.1 years. 27.2% of residents were under the age of 18 and 11.2% of residents were 65 years of age or older. For every 100 females there were 92.9 males, and for every 100 females age 18 and over there were 89.0 males age 18 and over.

96.9% of residents lived in urban areas, while 3.1% lived in rural areas.

There were 6,797 households in Kingsland, of which 38.3% had children under the age of 18 living in them. Of all households, 51.8% were married-couple households, 15.5% were households with a male householder and no spouse or partner present, and 26.1% were households with a female householder and no spouse or partner present. About 22.7% of all households were made up of individuals and 7.3% had someone living alone who was 65 years of age or older.

There were 7,302 housing units, of which 6.9% were vacant. The homeowner vacancy rate was 1.8% and the rental vacancy rate was 8.4%.

Racial composition as of the 2020 census
Race	Number	Percent
White	11,524	62.8%
Black or African American	4,177	22.8%
American Indian and Alaska Native	102	0.6%
Asian	433	2.4%
Native Hawaiian and Other Pacific Islander	27	0.1%
Some other race	471	2.6%
Two or more races	1,603	8.7%
Hispanic or Latino (of any race)	1,335	7.3%

== Education ==
Kingsland is served by the Camden County School District, which is headquartered in the city.

=== Higher education ===
- College of Coastal Georgia (Camden Center)
- Coastal Pines Technical College (Kingsland instructional site)

=== Secondary ===
- Camden County High School

=== Primary ===
- Camden Middle School
- Kingsland Elementary School
- Matilda Harris Elementary School
- David L. Rainer Elementary School

=== Private schools ===
- Southeast Christian Academy

== See also ==
- Interstate 95 in Georgia
- Georgia State Route 40
- Atlantic, Waycross and Northern Railroad
- List of municipalities in Georgia (U.S. state)
- National Register of Historic Places listings in Georgia
- WKBX
