= Satilla River =

River in the state of Georgia

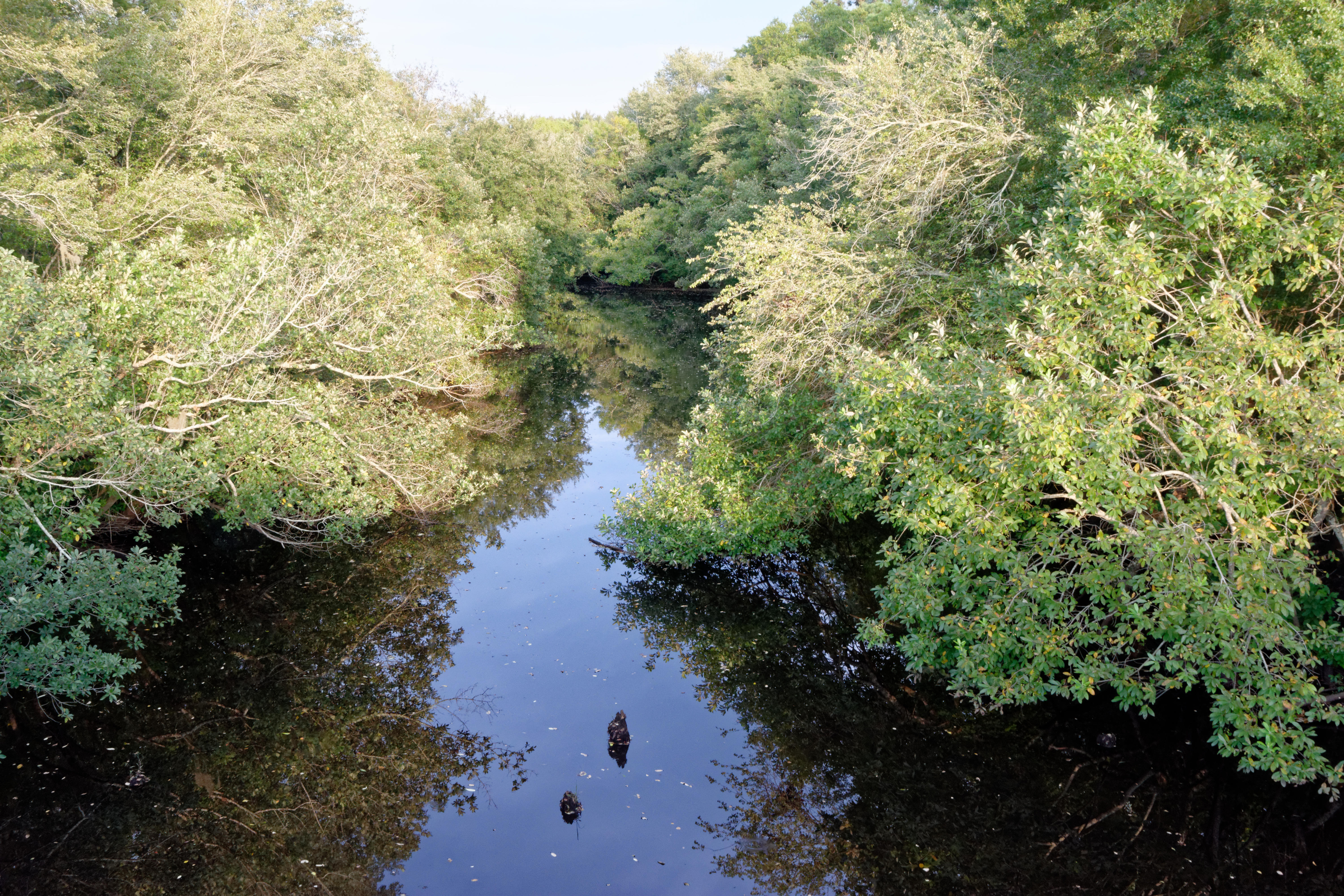
- Satilla River, south of Douglas, Georgia

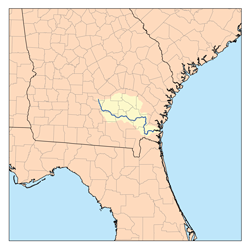

Location
- Country: United States
- State: Georgia
- Counties: Ben Hill, Ware, Brantley, Camden, Glynn

Physical characteristics
- Mouth
  - location: Atlantic Ocean
  - coordinates: 30°59′1″N 81°27′29″W
  - elevation: 0 ft (0 m)

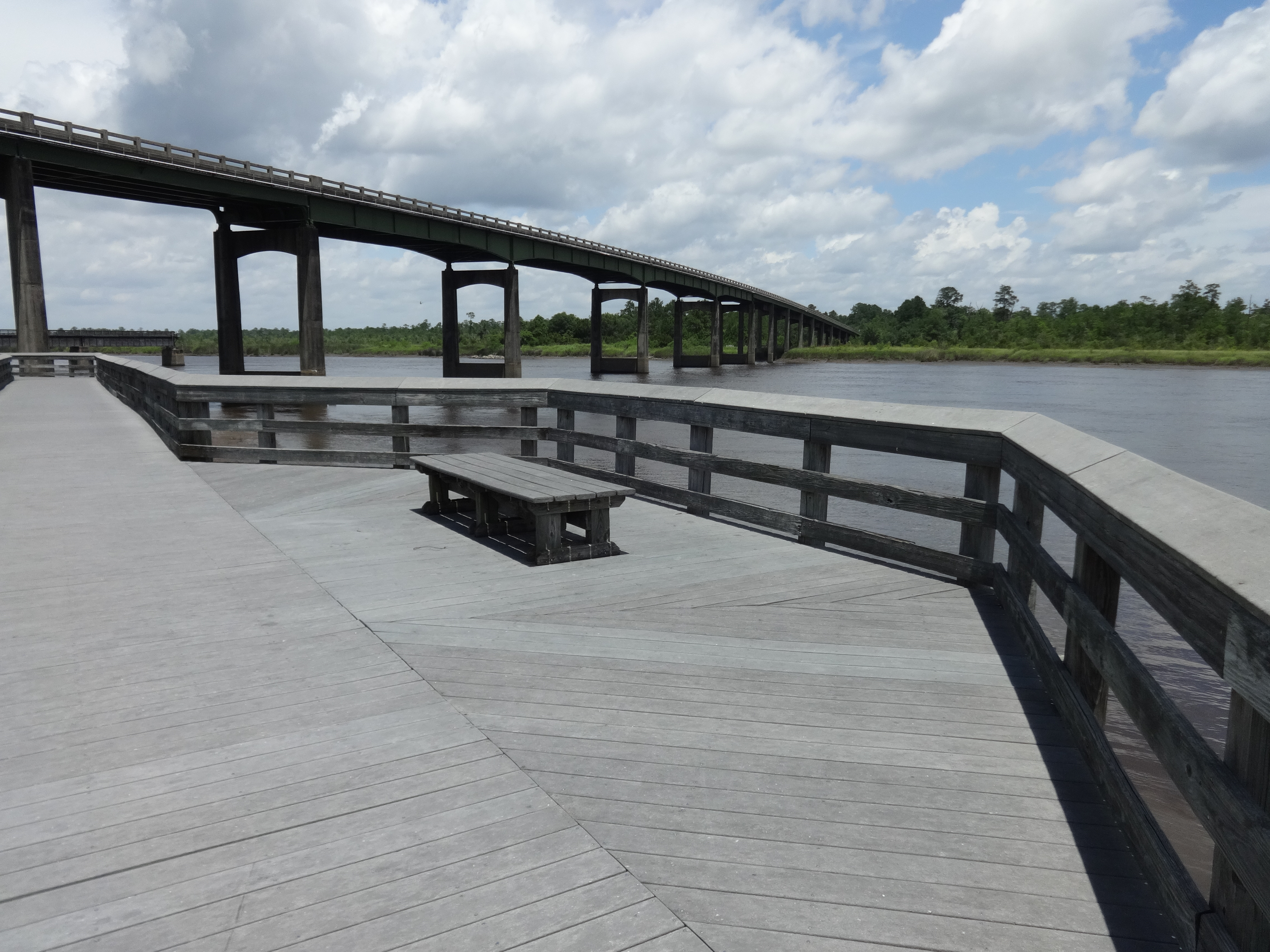
Satilla River Waterfront Park and the U.S. Route 17 bridge in Woodbine, Georgia

The Satilla River rises in Ben Hill County, Georgia, United States, near the town of Fitzgerald, and flows in a mostly easterly direction to the Atlantic Ocean. Along its approximately 235-mile (378 km) course are the cities of Waycross, Waynesville, and Woodbine. The Satilla drains almost 4,000 square miles (10,000 km^{2}) of land, all of it in the coastal plain of southeastern Georgia. It has white sandbars and is the largest blackwater river situated entirely within Georgia. The Satilla enters the Atlantic Ocean about 10 miles (16 km) south of Brunswick, at the 31st parallel north. Satilla River Marsh Island The river derives its name from a Spanish officer named Saint Illa, and over time the name was corrupted to form the word Satilla. French explorer Jean Ribault named the river the Somme when he encountered it in 1562. The river was later given the name Aisne by Jacques le Moyne.

== Ecology ==
The Satilla River is one of the few places in Georgia for observing nesting sites of brown pelicans.

In May 2010, the city of Waycross purchased the Bandalong Litter Trap and installed it in Tebeau Creek, a tributary of the Satilla River. The trap was invented in Australia, but is manufactured in the United States by Storm Water Systems. Although the city has maintained a good standing with the Environmental Protection Division, the city wanted to take action to reduce the amount of human generated trash entering the Satilla River and, ultimately, the Atlantic Ocean.
