= Main (surname) =

Main is a surname. Notable people with the surname include:

- Alan Main (born 1967), Scottish football goalkeeper
- Alan Main (minister) (1936–2023), Church of Scotland minister
- Alex Main (1884–1965), American baseball pitcher
- Alex Main (rugby league) (1900–1973), Australian rugby league footballer
- Alexander H. Main (1824–1896), American businessman and politician
- Anne Main (born 1957), Welsh-born English politician
- Annette Main (born 1951/2), New Zealand politician
- Archibald Main (1876–1947), Scottish ecclesiastical historian and minister
- Barbara York Main (1929–2019), Australian arachnologist and academic
- Ben Main (1887–1958), Australian rules footballer
- Bert Main (1919–2009), Australian zoologist
- Bill Main (footballer) (1915–1969), Scottish footballer
- Bobby Main (1909–1985), Scottish footballer
- Carolina Main (born 1987/8), English actress
- Cedric Main (born 1997), Dutch footballer
- Charles T. Main (1856–1943), American engineer and entrepreneur
- Corey Main (born 1995), New Zealand swimmer
- Curtis Main (born 1992), English footballer
- David Duncan Main (1856–1934), British doctor and missionary
- David Forsyth Main (1831–1880), New Zealand politician from Otago
- Davie Main (1888–1961), Scottish footballer
- Denise Main (born 1950), American physician and AIDS activist
- Derrick Main (1931–2022), Welsh rugby union footballer
- Doreen Main, Scottish bioinformatics researcher and plant scientist
- Doug Main (born 1946), Canadian broadcaster and politician
- Eilish Collins Main, American politician from Connecticut
- Emma Main (born 1999), New Zealand footballer
- Frank Main (born 1964), American journalist
- Franklin Main (1918–2008), American politician
- Gavin Main (born 1995), Scottish cricketer
- George Washington Main (1807–1836), Alamo defender
- George Main (horse racing) (1879–1948), Australian pastoralist and horse breeder, chairman of the Australian Jockey Club
- George Main (rugby league) (1910–1970), Australian rugby league footballer
- Gloria L. Main (born 1933), American economic historian
- Grant Main (born 1960), Canadian rower
- Gregor Main (born 1989), American golfer
- Hubert Main (1839–1925), American hymn writer and publisher
- Hugh Main (1883–1961), Australian politician
- Ian Main, British geophysicist
- Jack Main (John Alfred Main 1876–1945), Australian rules footballer
- Jackson Turner Main (1917–2003), American academic and historian
- James Main (1886–1909), Scottish footballer
- James Allen Main (born 1945), American judge from Alabama
- James Main (botanist) (1775?–1846), Scottish botanist
- Janet Main (born 1989), New Zealand basketball player
- Jim Main (1943–2022), Australian sports journalist and writer
- Joe Main, American government official
- John Main (1926–1982), English Roman Catholic priest and Benedictine monk
- John Main (minister) (1728–1795), Scottish minister
- John Main (politician) (born 1980), Canadian politician
- John F. Main (1864–1942), justice of the Washington Supreme Court
- Kent Main (born 1996), South African cyclist
- Laura Main (born 1977), Scottish actress
- Laurie Main (1922–2012), Australian actor
- Les Main (1915–1998), Australian rules footballer
- Lorne Main (1930–2019), Canadian tennis player
- Marjorie Main, stage name of American actress and singer Mary Tomlinson (1890–1975)
- Mary Main (1943–2023), American psychologist
- Oliver Main, guitarist with the English indie rock band the Pigeon Detectives
- Robert Main (1808–1878), British astronomer
- Sandy Main (1873–?), Scottish footballer and middle-distance runner
- Sarah Main, Australian DJ
- Stephanie Main (born 1976), British competitive figure skater
- Terence Main (born 1954), American modernist sculptor and designer
- Thomas Main (1911–1990), British psychiatrist and psychoanalyst
- Thomas Main (minister) (1816–1881), Scottish minister
- Verner Main (1885–1965), American politician from Michigan
- Vesna Main, Croatian-British novelist and short-story writer
- Walter Main (1875 – after 1901), Scottish footballer
- Walter L. Main (1862–1950), American showman and circus proprietor
- Willett Main (1828–1902), American politician
- William Hogarth Main, American cave diver
- Woody Main (1922–1992), American baseball player

== See also ==
- Justice Main (disambiguation)
- Main (disambiguation)
- Maine (surname)
- Maines (surname)
- Mayne (disambiguation)
- Demain (surname)
- Terry Le Main (born 1939), Jersey politician
