= Mannes =

Mannes is both a surname and a given name. Notable people with the name include:

Surname:

- Aaron Mannes (born 1970), American writer
- Astrid Mannes (born 1967), German politician
- Charlie Mannes (1863–1937), Scottish cricketer
- Clara Mannes (1869–1948), Polish-American musician and music educator
- David Mannes (1866–1959), American violinist, conductor, and educator
- Gerd Mannes (born 1969), German politician
- Leopold Mannes (1899–1964), American musician
- Marya Mannes (1904–1990), American writer and critic
- Totte Mannes (born 1933), Finnish artist

Given name:

- Mannes Francken (1888–1948), Dutch footballer

== See also ==
- Manes (disambiguation)
- Mánes Union of Fine Arts, a Czech arts organization
- Mane (disambiguation)
- Mani (disambiguation)
- Manassas (disambiguation)
- Manasses (disambiguation)
