= Maine (disambiguation) =

Maine is a U.S. state.

Maine may also refer to:

== Places ==
- Gulf of Maine, a gulf off the coast of the U.S. state
- Province of Maine, 17th-century English colonial entities on territory that eventually became the U.S. state

=== France ===
- Maine (province)
  - Maine-et-Loire, a department
- Maine (river)

=== United States ===
- Maine Township, Cook County, Illinois
- Maine Township, Grundy County, Illinois
- Maine River (Maine)
- Maine Township, Otter Tail County, Minnesota
- Maine, New York, a town
- Maine, Marathon County, Wisconsin, a village
- Maine, Outagamie County, Wisconsin, a town

== Names ==
- Maine (given name)
- Maine (surname)
- Maines (surname)

== Ships ==
- SS Maine, a British steam ship
- USS Maine (1889), a second-class pre-dreadnought battleship, launched in 1889, whose sinking contributed to the outbreak of the Spanish–American War
- Maine-class battleship, a battleship class of the U.S. Navy
  - USS Maine (BB-10), the lead ship of the Maine-class battleship, launched in 1901
- USS Maine (BB-69), a Montana-class battleship cancelled in 1943
- USS Maine (SSBN-741), an Ohio-class nuclear ballistic missile submarine launched in 1994
- TS State of Maine, a training ship of the Maine Maritime Academy

== Other uses ==
- Maine (film), a 2018 American drama film
- Maine (Red vs. Blue), a character in Red vs. Blue
- The Maine (Des Moines, Iowa), U.S., a historic apartment building
- The Maine (band), an American pop punk band
- Maine Soft Drinks Ltd, a Northern Irish soft drink manufacturer
- The Maine Attraction, American burlesque performer
- Uí Maine, an ancient Irish kingdom
- University of Maine, a university in the U.S. state
- State of Maine Express, a 20th-century night train from New York City to Portland, Maine
- "Maine", a song by John Linnell from the album State Songs, 1999

== See also ==
- Counts and Dukes of Maine
- Main (disambiguation)
- Maine Coon
- Maine law, an 1851 temperance law
- Maine Road, a British football stadium
- Mains (disambiguation)
- Mane (disambiguation)
- Mayne (disambiguation)
- River Maine (disambiguation)
