= Mayne (surname) =

Mayne is a surname, and may refer to:

- Alberta Mayne (born 1980), Canadian actress, theatre producer and activist
- Andrew Mayne, American magician and author
- Arthur Mayne (c.1898–c.1974), Australian rugby union footballer
- Belinda Mayne, British actress
- Brent Mayne (born 1968), American baseball catcher
- Charles Mayne (1855–1914), British Army officer and footballer
- Chris Mayne (born 1988), Australian rules footballer
- Clarice Mayne (1886–1966), British music hall and variety theatre singer and performer
- Clifton Mayne (1933–2014), American tennis player
- Cuthbert Mayne (c.1544–1577), English Roman Catholic priest and martyr
- Cyril Mayne (1877–1962), English clergyman and classical scholar
- David Mayne (1930–2024), South African electrical engineer and academic
- Ed Mayne (1945–2007), American politician from Utah
- Edgar Mayne (1882–1961), Australian cricketer
- Edith Mayne (1905–1953), British swimmer
- Edward Mayne (1756–1829), Irish judge
- Eric Mayne (1865–1947), Irish-American stage and film actor
- Ernie Mayne (1871–1937), English music hall entertainer
- Ethel Colburn Mayne (1865–1941), Irish writer
- Ferdy Mayne (1916–1998), German-British actor
- Frederick Allen Mayne III (born 1970), birth name of American singer Fred Durst
- Geoffrey Mayne (1928–2003), Catholic Bishop of the Australian Defence Force
- Harold Mayne-Nicholls (born 1961), Chilean journalist and football administrator
- Henry Mayne (1813–1892), English lawyer and amateur cricketer
- Jade Mayne (born 1989), South African field hockey player
- James O'Neil Mayne, Australian philanthropist
- Jasper Mayne (1604–1672), British clergyman, translator, minor poet and dramatist
- J. G. Mayne (Jasper Graham Mayne) (1859–1936), British soldier, marksman and police officer
- Jim Mayne (1950–2015), Canadian politician from Prince Edward Island
- John Mayne (1759–1836), Scottish printer, journalist and poet
- John Dawson Mayne (1828–1917), British lawyer in India
- José de Jesus Maria Mayne (1723–1792), Portuguese Catholic priest
- Judith Mayne (born 1948), American academic and film theorist
- Karen Mayne (1946–2024), American politician from Utah
- Kenny Mayne (born 1959/60), American sports journalist
- Laurie Mayne (born 1942), Australian cricketer
- Lew Mayne (1920–2013), American football player
- Lonnie Mayne (1943–1978), American professional wrestler
- Martina Mayne (c.1925–2013), German actress and poet
- Mary Emelia Mayne (1858–1940), Australian philanthropist
- Michael Mayne (1929–2006), Church of England Dean of Westminster
- Mosley Mayne (1889–1955), British Indian Army officer footballer
- Norman Mayne (born 1942), Australian rugby union
- Paddy Mayne (1915–1955), Northern Irish soldier and athlete
- Patrick Mayne, Australian butcher and alderman
- Perry Mayne (c.1697–1761), Royal Navy officer
- Peter Mayne (1908–1979), English travel writer
- Philip Mayne (1899–2007), English centenarian World War I veteran
- Richard Mayne (1796–1868), first joint Commissioner of the London Metropolitan Police
- Richard Mayne (administrator) (1926–2009), British civil servant and writer
- Richard Mayne (Royal Navy officer) (1835–1892), Royal Navy officer prominent in the history of British Columbia
- Robert Mayne (1724–1782), British merchant, banker and politician
- Roger Mayne (1929–2014), English photographer
- Roy Mayne (1935–1998), American stock car racing driver
- Seymour Mayne (born 1944), Canadian poet and literary translator
- Shawn Mayne (born 1980), Canadian football player
- Simon Mayne (1612–1661), English politician, one of the regicides of Charles I of England
- Simon Mayne (c.1644–1725), English politician
- Sinclair Mayne (born 1957), agricultural scientist from Northern Ireland
- Stephen Mayne (born 1969), Australian journalist
- Terry Mayne (1950–1983), Australian rules footballer
- Thom Mayne (born 1944), American architect
- Thomas Mayne (inventor) (1901–1995), Australian industrial chemist, inventor of the Nestlé drink Milo
- Thomas Mayne (politician) (1832–1915), Irish politician
- Thomas Mayne (rugby union) (1893–1961), Irish international rugby union footballer
- Wiley Mayne (1917–2007), American politician from Iowa
- William Mayne (1928–2010), British children's fiction author
- William Mayne (Australian politician) (1808–1902), Irish-Australian politician
- William Mayne (officer) (1818–1855), English army officer of the East India Company
- William Cyril Mayne (1877–1962), English clergyman and classical scholar
- William Mayne, 1st Baron Newhaven (1722–1794), British merchant and politician
- Zavia Mayne, Jamaican politician

== See also ==
- Maynes
- Maine (surname)
- Jules Mayné (1892–1977), Belgian footballer
