= Manes (disambiguation) =

Manes are the souls of deceased loved ones in Roman mythology.

Manes may refer to:

== Places ==
- Manes, Missouri, USA
- Manes River, a river of Greece
- Alaverdi or Manes, Armenia
- Manvo or Manes, Armenia

== People ==
- Manes of Lydia, a king of Maeonia (later called Lydia)
- Mani (prophet) or Manes, founder of Manichaeism
- Manes, a slave of Diogenes of Sinope

=== People with the name ===
- Manes (surname)
- Manès Sperber (1905-1984), Polish Jewish writer
- Joseph Manes Österreicher (1759-1831), Hungarian physician

=== Fictional characters ===
- Manes, a character in The Birds by Aristophanes

== Other uses ==
- Manes (band), a band from Trondheim, Norway

== See also ==
- Mánes Union of Fine Arts, a Czech arts organization
- Mannes, a surname
- Mane (disambiguation)
- Mani (disambiguation)
- Manassas (disambiguation)
- Manasses (disambiguation)
- Mains (disambiguation)
- Maynes (disambiguation)
