= Manes (surname) =

Manes, Mánes or Mánes is a surname. Notable people with the surname include:

- Antonín Mánes (1784–1843), Czech painter
- Donald R. Manes (1934–1986), borough president of Queens, New York
- Édouard Manès (1835–1898), governor general of French India
- Facundo Manes (born 1969), Argentine neurologist and politician
- Franco Manes (born 1963), Italian politician
- Gina Manès (1893–1989), French film actress
- Josef Mánes (1820–1871), Czech painter
- Michelle Manes, American mathematician
- Pablo Curatella Manes (1891–1963), Argentine painter
- Quido Mánes (1828–1880), Czech painter

== See also ==
- Mánes Union of Fine Arts, a Czech arts organization
- Mannes, a surname
- Mane (disambiguation)
- Mains (surname)
- Mani (disambiguation)
- Manassas (disambiguation)
- Manasses (disambiguation)
