= Mains (surname) =

Mains is a surname and may refer to:

- David F. Mains (1874–1949), American politician from Wisconsin
- Edwin Butterworth Mains (1890–1968), American mycologist
- Geoffrey Mains (1934–2021), English cricketer
- Gil Mains (1929–2009), American football player
- Jim Mains (1922–1969), American baseball pitcher
- John Mains (1851–1901), Irish nationalist politician
- Laurie Mains (born 1946), New Zealand rugby union footballer and coach
- S. L. Mains (1865–1934), American college football player and coach
- Willard Mains (1868–1923), American baseball pitcher

== See also ==
- Maines (surname)
- Main (surname)
- Manes (surname)
- Maynes
- McMains
