= National Register of Historic Places listings in Cumberland Island National Seashore =

This is a list of the National Register of Historic Places listings in Cumberland Island National Seashore.

This is intended to be a complete list of the properties and districts on the National Register of Historic Places in Cumberland Island National Seashore, Georgia, United States. The locations of National Register properties and districts for which the latitude and longitude coordinates are included below, may be seen in a Google map.

There are eight properties and districts listed on the National Register in the park.

This National Park Service list is complete through NPS recent listings posted June 27, 2025.

== Current listings ==
	Name on the Register	Image	Date listed	Location	City or town	Description
1	Duck House		February 13, 1984 (#84000938)	Cumberland Island; 30°50′50″N 81°25′51″W	St. Marys	
2	Dungeness Historic District	Dungeness Historic District	February 13, 1984 (#84000920)	Address Restricted	St. Marys	
3	High Point-Half Moon Bluff Historic District		December 22, 1978 (#78000265)	NE of St. Marys on Cumberland Island; 30°55′14″N 81°25′56″W	St. Marys	
4	Main Road		February 13, 1984 (#84000938)	Cumberland Island; 30°49′45″N 81°27′26″W	St. Marys	
5	Plum Orchard Historic District	Plum Orchard Historic District	November 23, 1984 (#84000258)	Address Restricted	St. Marys	
6	Rayfield Archeological District		February 13, 1984 (#84000924)	Address Restricted	St. Marys	
7	Stafford Plantation Historic District	Stafford Plantation Historic District	November 23, 1984 (#84000265)	Address Restricted	St. Marys	
8	Table Point Archeological District		November 23, 1984 (#84000260)	Address Restricted	St. Marys	

== Associated site ==
Greyfield is a private inholding on Cumberland Island.

	Name on the Register	Image	Date listed	Location	City or town	Description
1	Greyfield	Greyfield	July 24, 2003 (#03000675)	Cumberland Island; 30°46′51″N 81°27′51″W	Camden	

== See also ==
- National Register of Historic Places listings in Camden County, Georgia
- National Register of Historic Places listings in Georgia
