= Mani (name) =

Mani or Maney (Persian: مانی) is a common proper name in the Middle East and South Asia. In Persian, Mani (مانی) means "eternity", "thinker", and "thoughtful". It is most common in Iran, Pakistan, Nepal, and India. There are also a number of unrelated names also spelled Mani, some of them hypocoristic, such as German Mani for Manfred.

== List of persons with the given name ==
- Mani (prophet) (c. 216–276), Iranian prophet
- Mani (musician) (born 1962), English rock musician
- Mani Ram Bagri (1920–2012), politician from India
- Mani Madhava Chakyar (1899–1990), Indian master performance artist and Sanskrit scholar
- Mani Charenamei (born 1959), Indian politician
- Mani Damodara Chakyar (born 1946), Indian performance artist
- Mani Cooper (born 2003), British ski jumper
- Mani Haghighi (born 1969), Iranian filmmaker, screenwriter and actor
- Mani Hoffman (born 1975), French singer, songwriter and music producer
- Mani Jegathesan, Malaysian athlete
- Mani Kaul (1944–2011), Indian film director
- Mani Lama, Nepalese politician
- Mani Leib (1883–1953), Ukrainian Yiddish poet
- Mani Matter (1936–1972), Swiss singer-songwriter
- Mani Menon (born 1948), Indian-American surgeon
- Mani Nagappa (born 1925), Indian sculptor
- Mani Neumeier (born 1940), German rock musician
- Mani Nouri (born 1989), Iranian-Canadian film director, writer, and actor
- Mani Prasad (1930–2023), Indian vocalist
- Mani Rao (born 1965), Indian poet and translator
- Mani Sharma (born 1964), Indian music director
- Mani Ratnam (born 1956), Indian Tamil film director, producer, and writer
- Mani Bai (1573–1619), Mughal Empress consort
- Bhai Mani Singh (1644–1738), Sikh scholar and martyr

== List of persons with the surname ==
- Alain Mamou-Mani (born 1949), French film producer and writer
- Arthur Mamou-Mani (born 1983), French architect
- Babu Mani (1963–2022), Indian footballer
- Bonda Mani (1963–2023), Indian actor
- Charulatha Mani (born 1981), Indian singer
- Ehsan Mani (born 1945), Pakistani cricket player and official
- G. K. Mani, Indian politician
- Guy Mamou-Mani, French columnist
- Giuseppe Mani (born 1936), Italian archbishop
- Hadizatou Mani, Nigerien human rights activist
- Jose K. Mani, Indian politician
- K. C. S. Mani (1922–1987), Indian communist activist
- K. M. Mani (1933–2019), Indian politician
- Karaikudi Mani (1945–2023), Indian percussionist
- Kalabhavan Mani (1971–2016), Indian actor and singer
- Ko. Si. Mani (1929–2008), Indian politician
- Mahadeva Subramania Mani (1908–2003), Indian entomologist
- Myriam Léonie Mani (born 1977), Cameroonian athlete
- Pravin Mani, Indian musician
- Sapol Mani (born 1991), Togolese footballer
- Vettam Mani (1921–1987), Indian scholar and writer
- V. S. Mani, Indian legal scholar

== See also ==
- Mani (disambiguation)
