= Main Road =

A "main road" may refer to:

- A major road in a town or village, or in a country area.
- A priority road
- A highway
- A trunk road, especially in British English

Main Road may refer to:

- Main Road, Hobart, Australia
- Main Road, Cox's Bazar, Bangladesh
- Main Road (M)1.10 (Serbia)
- Main Road (M)1.9 (Serbia)
- Main Road (M)1 (Serbia)
- Main Road (Cumberland Island), listed on the NRHP in Camden County, Georgia, U.S.
- Main roads (Lesotho), the main roads of Lesotho

== See also ==
- Department of Main Roads (disambiguation)
- Main Central Road, Kerala, India
- Main North Road, Adelaide, South Australia, Australia
- Main Park Road, Miami-Dade County, Florida, U.S.
- Main South Road, Adelaide, South Australia, Australia
- Maine Road, a former football stadium in Moss Side, Manchester, England, UK
- Maine Road F.C. a soccer team in Manchester, England, UK
- Main (disambiguation)
- Main Street (disambiguation)
