= Main =

Main may refer to:

== Business ==
- Chas. T. Main, an American engineering and hydroelectric company founded in 1893
- Main Deli Steak House ("The Main"), a smoked-meat delicatessen in Montreal, Quebec, Canada
- Main (cigarette), a European brand

== Places ==
- Main, Iran, a village in Fars Province
- Ma'in, an ancient kingdom in modern-day Yemen
- The Main, the diverse core running through Montreal, Quebec, Canada
- Main Range (Snowy Mountains), New South Wales, Australia
- Main Ranges, a group of mountain ranges in the Canadian Rockies in British Columbia and Alberta
- Main Ridge, Tobago
- Main Dyke, a water channel running through the Fylde area of Lancashire, England
- Cape Main, Coulman Island, Victoria Land, Antarctica
- Main (lunar crater), located near the north pole of the Moon
- Main (Martian crater)

== Rivers ==
- Main (river), Germany
- Main River (Chukotka), Russia
- Main River (Newfoundland), Canada
- River Main (County Antrim), Northern Ireland

=== Legislative ===
- Main river, a statutory designation of larger watercourses in England and Wales

== People ==
- Main (surname), a list of people with this name
- Main Bocher (1890–1976), American couturier and fashion label founder
- Main, alternate spelling for the Minaeans, an ancient people of modern-day Yemen

== Ships ==
- Main (1884 ship), an iron sailing ship launched in 1884
- SS Main, list of steamships with this name
- Main (A515), a modern German replenishment ship
- Short for mainsail

== Transportation ==
- Main Road (disambiguation)
- Main Street (disambiguation)
- Main station (disambiguation)

== Other uses ==
- Main (band), a British ambient band formed in 1991
- Main Brave, a fictional character from Brave Animated Series by Yellow Book
- MAIN (Mountain Area Information Network), former operator of WPVM-LP (MAIN-FM) in Asheville, North Carolina, United States
- MAIN, a virtual assistant platform developed by HAVELSAN
- Main course, the featured or primary dish in a meal
- Main(), another name for the entry point in a computer program, where control switches from the operating system to the program

== See also ==
- Spanish Main, the Caribbean coasts of mainland Spanish territories in the 16th and 17th centuries
- Mains (disambiguation)
- Maine (disambiguation)
- Mayne (disambiguation)
- Mane (disambiguation)
