= Thomas Mayne =

Thomas Mayne may refer to:

- Thomas Mayne (politician) (1832–1915), member of parliament (MP) for Mid Tipperary, 1885–1890
- Thomas Mayne (inventor) (1901–1995), Australian industrial chemist, inventor of the Nestlé drink Milo
- Thomas Mayne (rugby union) (1893–1961), Irish international rugby union footballer
- Thomas Mayne, MP for Newcastle-under-Lyme

== See also ==
- Thom Mayne (born 1944), American architect
- Thomas Mayne Reid (1818–1883), Irish-American novelist
