= Mains =

Mains may refer to:

- Mains electricity ("line power" in the United States)
- Mains electricity by country
- Electricity transmission
- Public utility, "mains services", including electricity, natural gas, water, and sewage disposal
- Main course, the primary dish of a meal, following a starter
- Mains (Scotland), the main buildings of a farm
- BMX racing
- Water mains
- Author abbreviation for Edwin Butterworth Mains

== See also ==
- Main (disambiguation)
- Manes (disambiguation)
- Maynes (disambiguation)
- Mains (surname)
- Mainz, a city in Germany
- McMains
