= Alexander Main =

Alexander Main may refer to:

- Sandy Main (1873–?), Scottish footballer and middle-distance runner
- Alexander H. Main (1824–1896), American businessman and politician
- Alex Main (rugby league) (1900–1973), Australian rugby league footballer
