= Demain =

Demain may refer to:

- Tomorrow (2008 film) (a/k/a Demain), a 2008 Canadian drama film directed by Maxime Giroux
- Tomorrow (2015 film) (a/k/a Demain), a 2015 French documentary film by Cyril Dion and Mélanie Laurent
- "Demain" (song), 2018 song by Bigflo & Oli in collaboration with Petit Biscuit

== People with the surname ==
- Demain (surname)
