= Battle of the Bridge (disambiguation) =

Battle of the Bridge was a battle between the Rashidun Caliphate and the Sassanid Empire in 634.

The Battle of the Bridge may also refer to:

== Conflicts and wars ==
- Battle of the Milvian Bridge (312), between Roman Emperors Constantine I and Maxentius
- Battle of the Bridge of Cornellana (842), between Nepotian of Asturias and Ramiro I
- Battle of Stamford Bridge (1066), part of the Viking invasions of England
- Battle of Stirling Bridge (1297), First War of Scottish Independence
- Battle of Strasbourg Bridge (1634), Thirty Years' War
- Battle of Great Bridge (1775), American War of Independence
- Battle of Moore's Creek Bridge (1776), American War of Independence
- Battle of the Bridge of Arcole (1796), French Revolutionary Wars
- Battle of Calderón Bridge (1811), Mexican War of Independence
- Battle of Natural Bridge (1865), American Civil War
- Battle of the Bridges (1990), Gulf War

== Sports rivalries ==
- Battle of the Bridge (Canisius–Niagara), American college rivalry between Canisius College and Niagara University
- Battle of the Bridge, a rugby union rivalry between Auckland and North Harbour Rugby Union, New Zealand
- Sydney Derby (AFL), also referred to as the Battle of the Bridge
- Melbourne Victory FC–Western United FC rivalry, also referred to as the Battle of the Bridge
- Battle of the Bridge, an English Premier League (EPL) game during the 2015–2016 season between Chelsea F.C. and Tottenham Hotspur F.C.
