= Calle Mayor =

Calle Mayor may refer to:

- Calle Mayor (Madrid), a street in Madrid, Spain
- Calle Mayor (film), a 1956 Spanish film
- Calle Mayor Middle School, a middle school in Torrance, California

== See also ==
- Main Street (disambiguation)
