= River Maine =

River Maine or Maine River or variation, may refer to:

- River Maine (County Antrim), Northern Ireland, flows into Lough Neagh
- River Maine (County Kerry), Ireland, flows into the Atlantic
- Maine River (Maine), United States
- Maine (river), France, a tributary of the Loire

== See also ==
- Main River (disambiguation)
- Maine (disambiguation)
