= Main Street station =

Main Street station may refer to:

== Canada ==
- Main Street station (Toronto), a subway station in Toronto, Ontario, Canada
- Main Street–Science World station, a SkyTrain station in Vancouver, British Columbia, Canada

== United Kingdom ==
- Main Street railway station (Glasgow), in Glasgow, Scotland

== United States ==
- Main Street station (SEPTA), in Norristown, Pennsylvania, United States
- Main Street Station Hotel and Casino and Brewery, in Las Vegas, Nevada, United States
- Alma School/Main Street station, in Mesa, Arizona, United States
- Center/Main Street station, in Mesa, Arizona, United States
- Flushing–Main Street (IRT Flushing Line), in Queens, New York, United States
- Flushing–Main Street (LIRR station), in Queens, New York, United States
- Main Street/Downers Grove station, in Downers Grove, Illinois, United States
- Main Street/Evanston station, in Evanston, Illinois, United States
- Mesa Drive/Main Street station, in Mesa, Arizona, United States
- Richmond Main Street Station, in Richmond, Virginia, United States
- Southeast Main Street MAX Station, in Portland, Oregon, United States
- Sycamore/Main Street station, in Mesa, Arizona, United States

== See also ==
- Main Street (disambiguation)
- Main station (disambiguation)
