= Moni (disambiguation) =

Moni is the second most important god in the pre-Islamic pantheon of the Nuristani people.

Moni may refer to:

== People ==
- Moni people, an ethnic group in Western New Guinea
- Aminul Huq Moni (1949–2015), Bangladeshi sports organizer and media executive
- Christophe Moni (born 1972), French rugby union player
- Dipu Moni (born 1965), Bangladeshi politician, former Minister of Education and Foreign Minister
- Md. Moniruzzaman Moni, 21st century Bangladeshi politician
- Mohammad Ali Moni, Bangladeshi computer engineer, researcher and data analyst
- Moni Bhattacharjee (fl. 1958–1970), Indian film director and screenwriter
- Moni Fanan (1946–2009), Israeli basketball team manager
- Moni Mohsin (born 1963), British-Pakistani writer
- Moni Moshonov (born 1951), Israeli actor and comedian
- Moni Naor, Israeli computer scientist
- Moni Ovadia (born 1946), Italian actor, musician, singer and author
- Moni Singh (1901–1990), Bengali communist politician
- Moni, nickname of Hassan Chaito, Lebanese footballer
- Pori Moni, stage name of Bangladeshi actress Shamsunnahar Smrity (born 1992)

== Places ==
- Moni, a village, part of the village of Sougia, Crete
- Moni, Cyprus, a village in Cyprus
- Moni, a small uninhabited island off the island of Aegina (Greece)
- Moni, a village on the island Naxos (Greece)
- Moni a small town in central Flores island close to Kelimutu volcano (Indonesia)

== Other uses ==
- Moni language, a language of Indonesia
- Monnett Moni, motorglider

== See also ==
- Mani (disambiguation)
