= McMains =

McMains is a family name which may refer to one of the following persons.

- Cody McMains, American film and television actor
- Jim McMains, French vocalist of Les Irrésistibles
- Steve McMains, French bass player
- Juliet McMains, American dance scholar and teacher
- Maury McMains (1903–1993), American football and basketball coach
- Ross McMains, Australian basketball coach

== See also ==
- McMain
- Mains (disambiguation)
