= Danville, Iowa =

- City
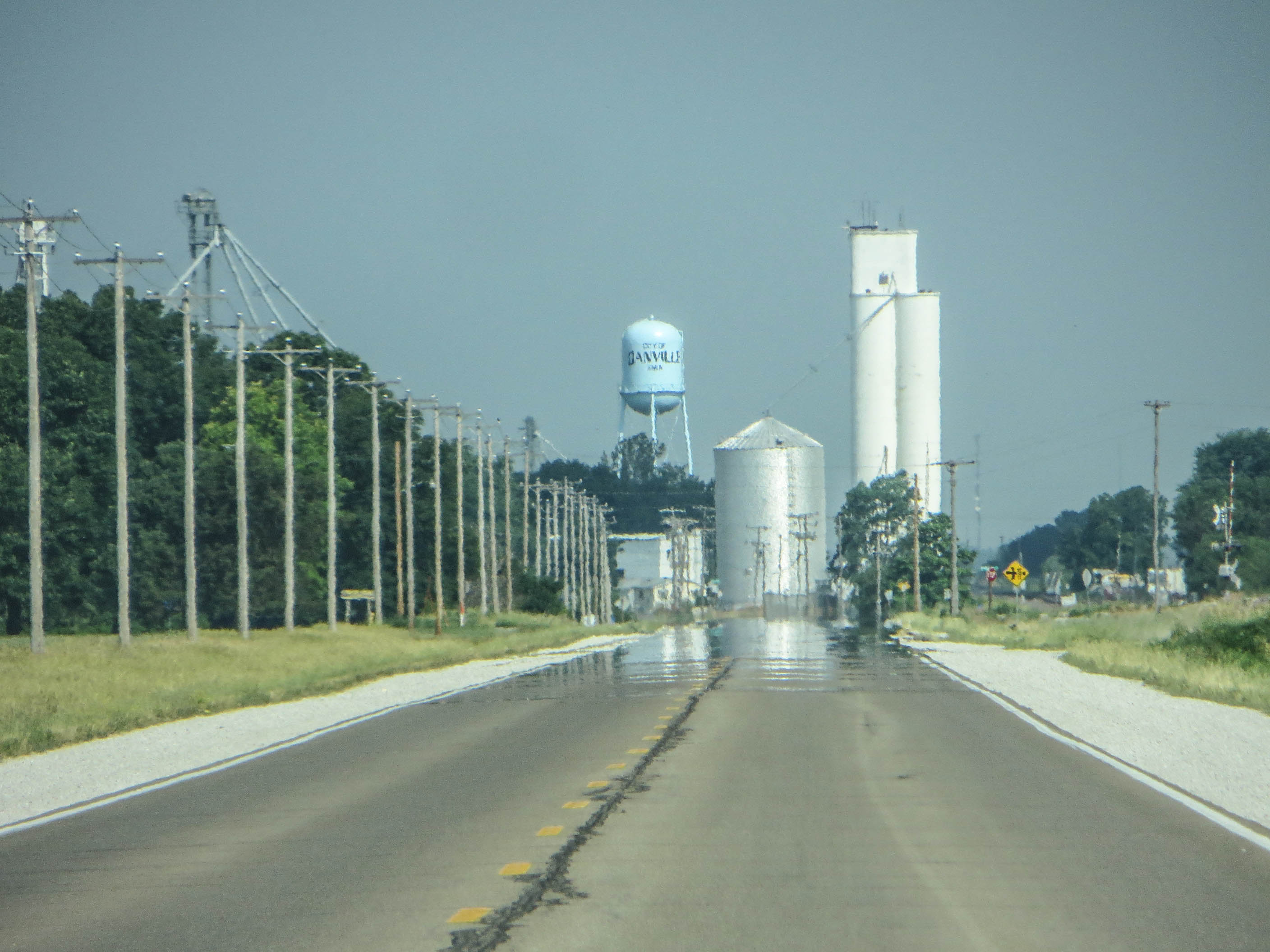
- Entering Danville on U.S. Route 34 Business

- Location of Danville, Iowa
- Coordinates: 40°51′36″N 91°18′52″W
- Country: USA
- State: Iowa
- County: Des Moines

Area
  - Total: 0.75 sq mi (1.94 km^{2})
  - Land: 0.75 sq mi (1.94 km^{2})
  - Water: 0 sq mi (0.00 km^{2})
- Elevation: 712 ft (217 m)

Population (2020)
  - Total: 927
  - Density: 1,237.3/sq mi (477.72/km^{2})
- Time zone: UTC-6 (Central (CST))
  - Summer (DST): UTC-5 (CDT)
- ZIP code: 52623
- Area code: 319
- FIPS code: 19-18435
- GNIS feature ID: 2393716
- Website: danvilleiowa.org

Danville is a city in Des Moines County, Iowa, United States. The population was 927 at the time of the 2020 census. It is part of the Burlington, IA–IL Micropolitan Statistical Area.

== History ==
Danville was founded in 1854.

== Geography ==
According to the United States Census Bureau, the city has a total area of 0.76 square miles (1.97 km^{2}), all land.

Danville is located approximately four miles northeast of Geode State Park.

== Demographics ==
Historical populations
Year	Pop.	±%
1910	263	—
1920	289	+9.9%
1930	327	+13.1%
1940	309	−5.5%
1950	450	+45.6%
1960	579	+28.7%
1970	948	+63.7%
1980	994	+4.9%
1990	926	−6.8%
2000	914	−1.3%
2010	934	+2.2%
2020	927	−0.7%
Source:"U.S. Census website". United States Census Bureau. and Iowa Data Center; Source: U.S. Decennial Census

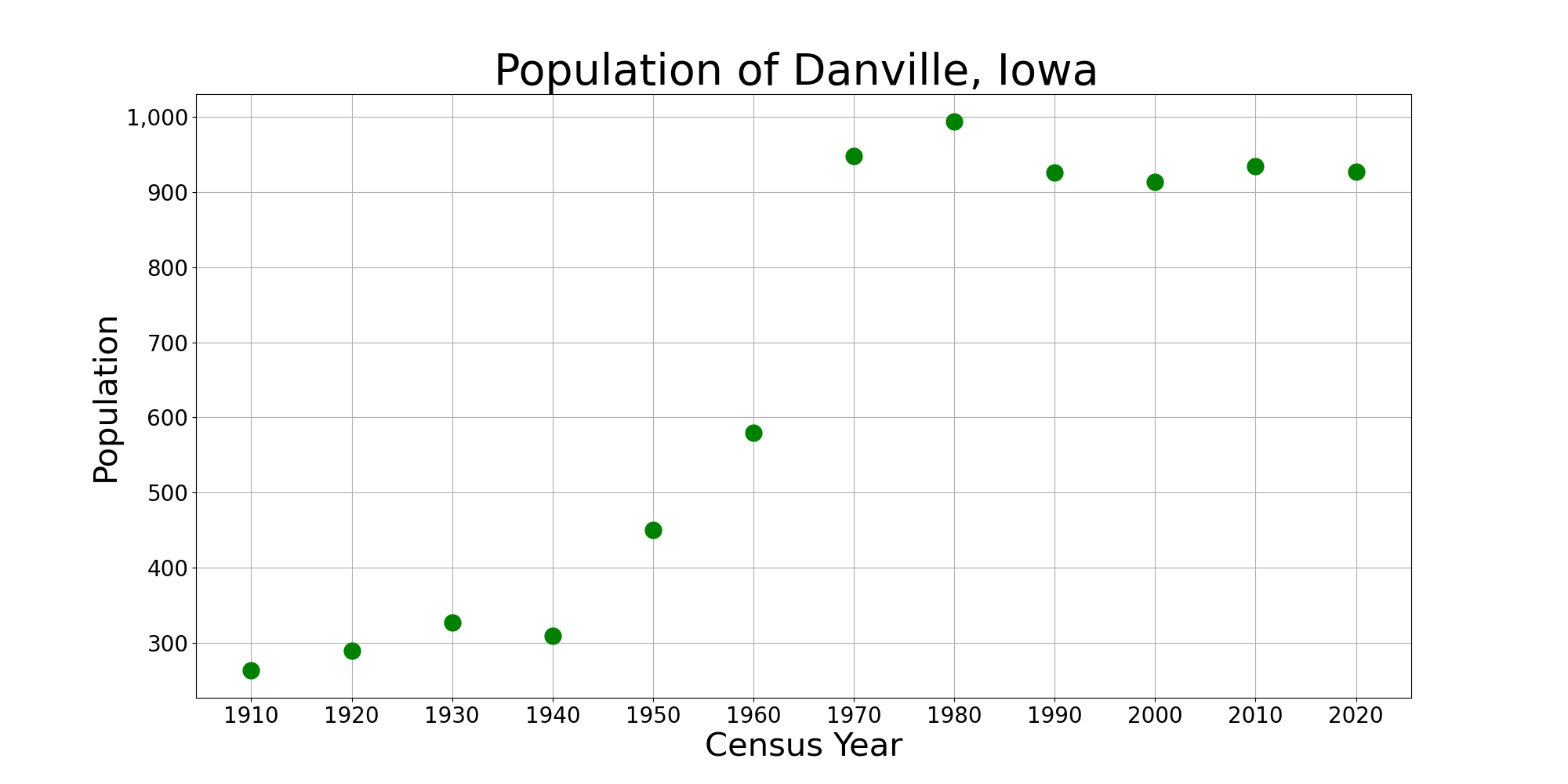
The population of Danville, Iowa from US census data

=== 2020 census ===
As of the census of 2020, there were 927 people, 367 households, and 267 families residing in the city. The population density was 1,237.3 inhabitants per square mile (477.7/km^{2}). There were 381 housing units at an average density of 508.5 per square mile (196.3/km^{2}). The racial makeup of the city was 94.6% White, 0.2% Black or African American, 0.0% Native American, 0.4% Asian, 0.1% Pacific Islander, 1.1% from other races and 3.6% from two or more races. Hispanic or Latino persons of any race comprised 1.5% of the population.

Of the 367 households, 41.4% of which had children under the age of 18 living with them, 55.3% were married couples living together, 7.1% were cohabitating couples, 23.4% had a female householder with no spouse or partner present and 14.2% had a male householder with no spouse or partner present. 27.2% of all households were non-families. 24.3% of all households were made up of individuals, 13.1% had someone living alone who was 65 years old or older.

The median age in the city was 38.9 years. 29.0% of the residents were under the age of 20; 5.4% were between the ages of 20 and 24; 23.8% were from 25 and 44; 23.4% were from 45 and 64; and 18.3% were 65 years of age or older. The gender makeup of the city was 49.0% male and 51.0% female.

=== 2010 census ===
As of the census of 2010, there were 934 people, 362 households, and 262 families living in the city. The population density was 1,228.9 inhabitants per square mile (474.5/km^{2}). There were 387 housing units at an average density of 509.2 per square mile (196.6/km^{2}). The racial makeup of the city was 96.1% White, 1.8% African American, 0.2% Native American, 0.5% Asian, 0.2% from other races, and 1.1% from two or more races. Hispanic or Latino of any race were 1.3% of the population.

There were 362 households, of which 34.3% had children under the age of 18 living with them, 57.2% were married couples living together, 12.2% had a female householder with no husband present, 3.0% had a male householder with no wife present, and 27.6% were non-families. 24.3% of all households were made up of individuals, and 9.7% had someone living alone who was 65 years of age or older. The average household size was 2.49 and the average family size was 2.94.

The median age in the city was 38.9 years. 25.9% of residents were under the age of 18; 6.5% were between the ages of 18 and 24; 24.4% were from 25 to 44; 23.6% were from 45 to 64; and 19.7% were 65 years of age or older. The gender makeup of the city was 48.3% male and 51.7% female.

=== 2000 census ===
As of the census of 2000, there were 914 people, 352 households, and 262 families living in the city. The population density was 1,209.2 inhabitants per square mile (466.9/km^{2}). There were 379 housing units at an average density of 501.4 per square mile (193.6/km^{2}). The racial makeup of the city was 99.02% White, 0.11% African American, 0.11% Native American, 0.22% Asian, 0.22% from other races, and 0.33% from two or more races. Hispanic or Latino of any race were 0.44% of the population.

There were 352 households, out of which 33.2% had children under the age of 18 living with them, 63.6% were married couples living together, 8.0% had a female householder with no husband present, and 25.3% were non-families. 23.0% of all households were made up of individuals, and 12.8% had someone living alone who was 65 years of age or older. The average household size was 2.50 and the average family size was 2.95.

Age spread: 24.4% under the age of 18, 8.6% from 18 to 24, 24.5% from 25 to 44, 22.0% from 45 to 64, and 20.5% who were 65 years of age or older. The median age was 39 years. For every 100 females, there were 90.4 males. For every 100 females age 18 and over, there were 89.3 males.

The median income for a household in the city was $45,357, and the median income for a family was $48,875. Males had a median income of $34,844 versus $18,162 for females. The per capita income for the city was $19,659. About 2.8% of families and 3.1% of the population were below the poverty line, including 3.0% of those under age 18 and 4.6% of those age 65 or over.

== Education ==
The Danville Community School District operates local public schools.

== Notable people ==
- S. L. Mains, (1865 – 1934) football player and coach
