= International Development Research Centre =

Canadian government agency

Centre overview
- Formed: 1970
- Type: Crown corporation
- Jurisdiction: Government of Canada
- Headquarters: 45 O'Connor St, Ottawa, ON K1P 1A4
- Annual budget: $201.6 m CAD (2021-22)
- Minister responsible: Anita Anand, Minister of Foreign Affairs
- Centre executives: Dorothy Nyambi, Chairperson; Julie Delahanty, President
- Parent department: Global Affairs Canada
- Website: idrc-crdi.ca

The International Development Research Centre (IDRC; French: Centre de recherches pour le développement international, CRDI) is a Canadian federal Crown corporation. As part of Canada's foreign affairs and development efforts, IDRC champions and funds research and innovation within and alongside developing regions to drive global change. IDRC invests in high-quality research in developing countries, shares knowledge with researchers and policymakers for greater uptake and use, and mobilizes global alliances to build a more sustainable and inclusive world.

According its 2021-22 Annual Report, IDRC's parliamentary appropriation reflects 3% of Canada's international assistance envelope.

== Activities ==
According to its Strategy 2030, IDRC's work currently focuses on the following five areas, aimed at contributing to the achievement of the United Nations' Sustainable Development Goals: climate-resilient food systems; global health; education and science; democratic and inclusive governance; and sustainable inclusive economies.

== History ==
IDRC was established by the Parliament of Canada in 1970 under the Research Centre Act, which directs IDRC "to initiate, encourage, support and conduct research into the problems of the developing regions of the world and into the means for applying and adapting scientific, technical, and other knowledge to the economic and social advancement of those regions."

== Governance ==
IDRC's head office is located in Ottawa, Ontario, with regional offices located in Montevideo, Uruguay; Nairobi, Kenya; Dakar, Senegal; Amman, Jordan; New Delhi, India.

IDRC is governed by a board of governors, whose chairperson reports to the Minister of Foreign Affairs through the Secretary of State for International Development.

The board includes:

- Dorothy Nyambi (Ancaster, ON) – Chairperson
- Julie Delahanty – President
- Nurjehan Mawani (Vancouver, BC) – Vice-chairperson
- Akwasi Aidoo (Gastonia, NC, US) – Governor
- Alex Awiti (Nairobi, Kenya)
- Purnima Mane (San Mateo, CA, US) – Governor
- Bessma Momani (Kitchener, ON) – Governor
- Gilles Rivard (Ottawa, ON) – Governor
- Hilary Rose (Parc Sherwood, AB) – Governor
- Stephen Toope (Cambridge, UK) – Governor

Regional directors:

- Federico Burone (Latin America and the Caribbean)
- Kapil Kapoor (Asia)
- Marie-Gloriose Ingabire (Central and West Africa)
- Kathryn Toure (Eastern and Southern Africa)
- Wessam El Beih (Middle East and North Africa)
