= Willstätt =

- Municipality
- Coat of arms

- Location of Willstätt within Ortenaukreis district
- Interactive map of Willstätt
- Location within Germany Location within Baden-Württemberg
- Coordinates: 48°32′30″N 07°53′47″E
- Country: Germany
- State: Baden-Württemberg
- Admin. region: Freiburg
- District: Ortenaukreis

Government
  - Mayor (2019–27): Christian Huber

Area
  - Total: 55.27 km^{2} (21.34 sq mi)
- Elevation: 142 m (466 ft)

Population (2025-12-31)
  - Total: 9,999
  - Density: 180.9/km^{2} (468.6/sq mi)
- Time zone: UTC+01:00 (CET)
  - Summer (DST): UTC+02:00 (CEST)
- Postal codes: 77731
- Dialling codes: 07852
- Vehicle registration: OG, BH, KEL, LR, WOL
- Website: www.willstaett.de

Willstätt (German pronunciation: [ˈvɪlʃtɛt]) is a municipality in the district of Ortenau in Baden-Württemberg in Germany, with a population of 9,787 as at December 31, 2017. It is around 12 kilometres (7.5 mi) east of Strasbourg's city centre.

== Demographics ==
Willstätt's population 2005-2017
2005	2006	2008	2010	2012	2013	2015	2016	2017
9,787	9172	9088	9096	9213	9352	9569	9680	9787

== History ==
=== Medieval ===
The earliest known mention to the town is from 1232.

=== Early Modern ===
In September 1634, three weeks after their biggest victory of the war at Nördlingen, Willstätt was burned as a result of a skirmish between Catholics under Jan von Werth and Swedes under Rheingrave Otto Louis.
In August 1643 Imperialist forces took the town's castle. On 1 August 1675, during the Rhineland campaign of the 1672-1678 Franco-Dutch War, a French army under Comte de Lorges and an Imperial force led by Raimondo Montecuccoli fought a battle nearby at Altenheim, Neuried.

On October 30, 1754, the tower of the Lutheran church, which was to be planned to be inaugurated on this day collapsed and destroyed many parts of the church as result of a bad foundation. It was later rebuilt with a foundation consisting of oak pillars and the inauguration of the church took then place on November 11, 1756.
