= Battle of Strasbourg Bridge =

1634 battle of the Thirty Years' War

- Part of the Thirty Years' War
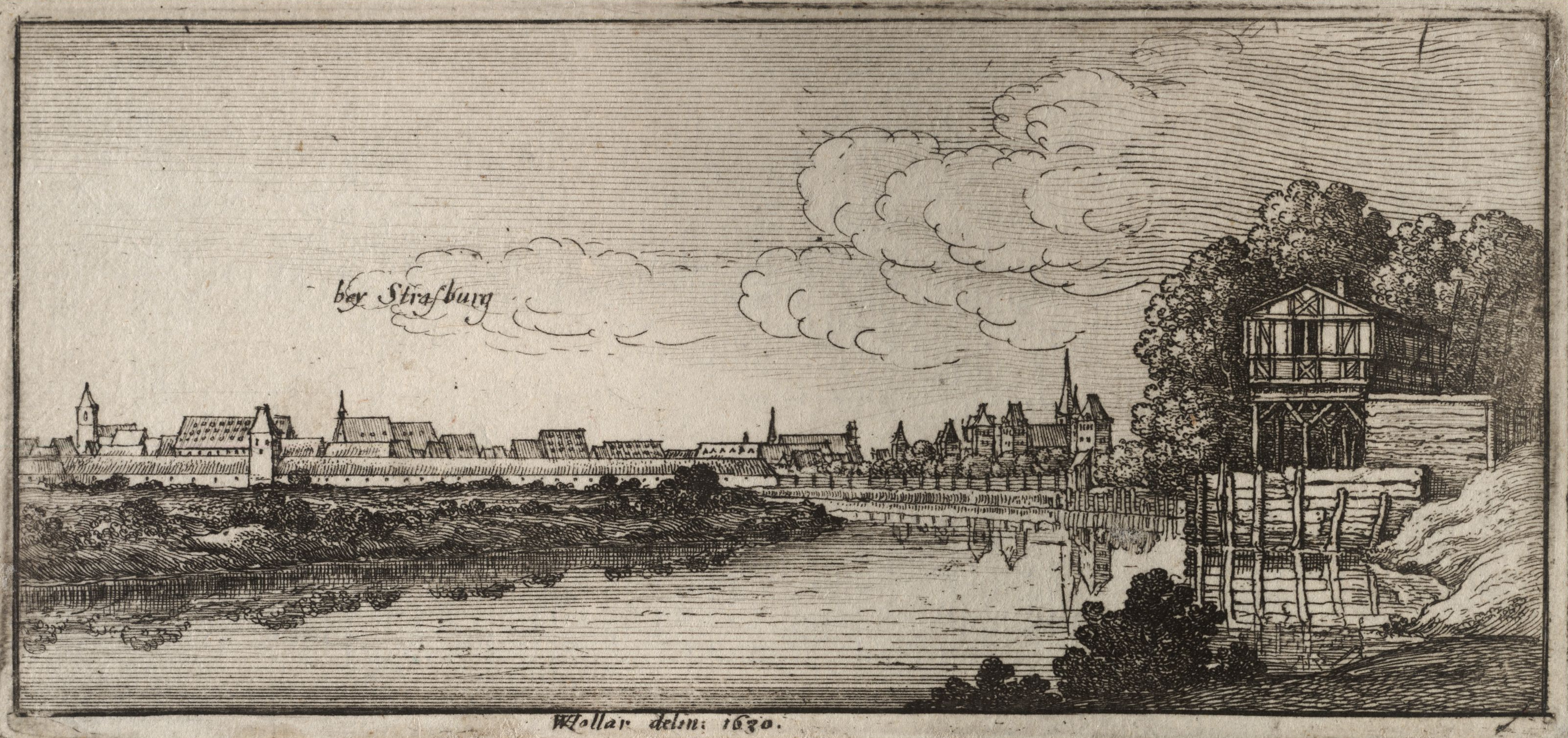
- The Rhine river with Strasbourg in distance during the 17th century, by Wenceslaus Hollar
Date	27/28 September 1634
Location	Kehl, Margraviate of Baden present-day Baden-Württemberg, Germany
Result	Imperial victory

Belligerents
Swedish Empire; Heilbronn League	Holy Roman Empire; Catholic League; Lorraine

Commanders and leaders
(Swedish Empire) (yes) Otto Ludwig (yes) Duke of Württemberg (yes) Margrave of Baden-Durlach	(Holy Roman Empire) (Duchy of Lorraine) Charles IV, Duke of Lorraine (Holy Roman Empire) Johann von Werth

Strength
6,000–7,000	3,000 cavalry 1,500–2,000 infantry

Casualties and losses
300–2,000	Unknown

The Battle of Strasbourg Bridge, 26 to 27 September 1634, took place during the Thirty Years' War, outside the Free imperial city of Strasbourg. Following their defeat at Nördlingen on 6 September by an Imperial-Spanish force, the Swedish commander, Otto Louis, tried to retreat over the Rhine using the Strasbourg bridge.

Led by Charles IV of Lorraine and Johann von Werth, the forces of the Catholic League caught up with the Swedish rearguard at Willstätt. They then attacked the entrenchments near the Strasbourg bridge in Kehl, as the Swedes were crossing the Rhine. The battle lasted for three hours and culminated with fighting on the bridge, before the Swedes successfully retreated into Strasbourg.

== Background ==
The small Swedish army under Otto Louis captured almost all of Upper Alsace from the Habsburgs in March 1634 after defeating the Duke of Lorraine at Wattwiller. Subsequently, Otto Louis took Freiburg im Breisgau and invested Rheinfelden while leaving a blockade corps at the remaining Habsburg stronghold Breisach. The Swedish main commander Gustav Horn ordered him to focus on the arriving Spanish troops under the Cardinal-Infante Ferdinand. Despite Ferdinand marching northeast into Swabia to unite with the main Imperial army against the Swedes, Otto Louis stayed at the Rhine. Because Rheinfelden's garrison under Franz von Mercy tenaciously resisted until 19 August and Otto Louis only hesitantly set off to reinforce Horn, he arrived too late to participate at the Battle of Nördlingen and could only assist in collecting the hammered troops.

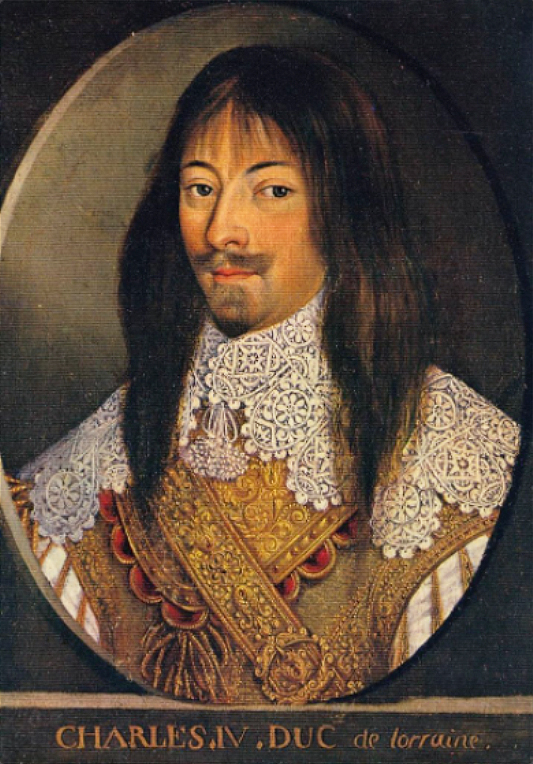
Portrait of Charles IV, Duke of Lorraine, by an unknown author.

After the destruction of the main Swedish field army in Germany and the capture of its commander Horn at Nördlingen, the Catholic armies gathered for the battle divided again and advanced into the lands occupied by the Swedish or held by their German allies. The bulk of the Imperial and Spanish armies advanced northwards upon Franconia, where Duke Bernhard of Saxe-Weimar, commander of the German Protestant forces, had withdrawn. At the same time, Duke Charles IV of Lorraine, now appointed commander of the German Catholic League, and his cavalry general Johann von Werth invaded the duchy of Württemberg, a wealthy country where their troops could recover from the battle.

On demand of Maximilian I of Bavaria, Emperor Ferdinand II sent Charles of Lorraine at the Rhine to expel the Swedes from their remaining strongholds. Lorraine's vanguard under Werth met and defeated the rearguard of Otto Louis at Calw, capturing six guns and four standards. The Rheingrave fled to Offenburg, where he reassembled his troops. Werth joined forces with Duke Charles while the Rheingrave was reinforced by the Duke of Württemberg who had been forced to lift the siege of Villingen.

After having received news of the approaching Imperial army, Rheingrave Otto marched his troops to the Strasbourg bridge, to retreat over the Rhine. In total, he had 6,000 or 7,000 men, including the troops of the Duke of Württemberg and the Margrave of Baden-Durlach — French reinforcements under colonel Batilly, the lieutenant of the Duke of Rohan, were also expected, but these arrived too late to take part in the fighting. To prevent the Swedish crossing of the river, Werth led a vanguard consisting of 6 regiments of cavalry, 2 of croats and 300 musketeers, in all about 3,000 cavalry and 1,500 or 2,000 infantry.

== Battle ==
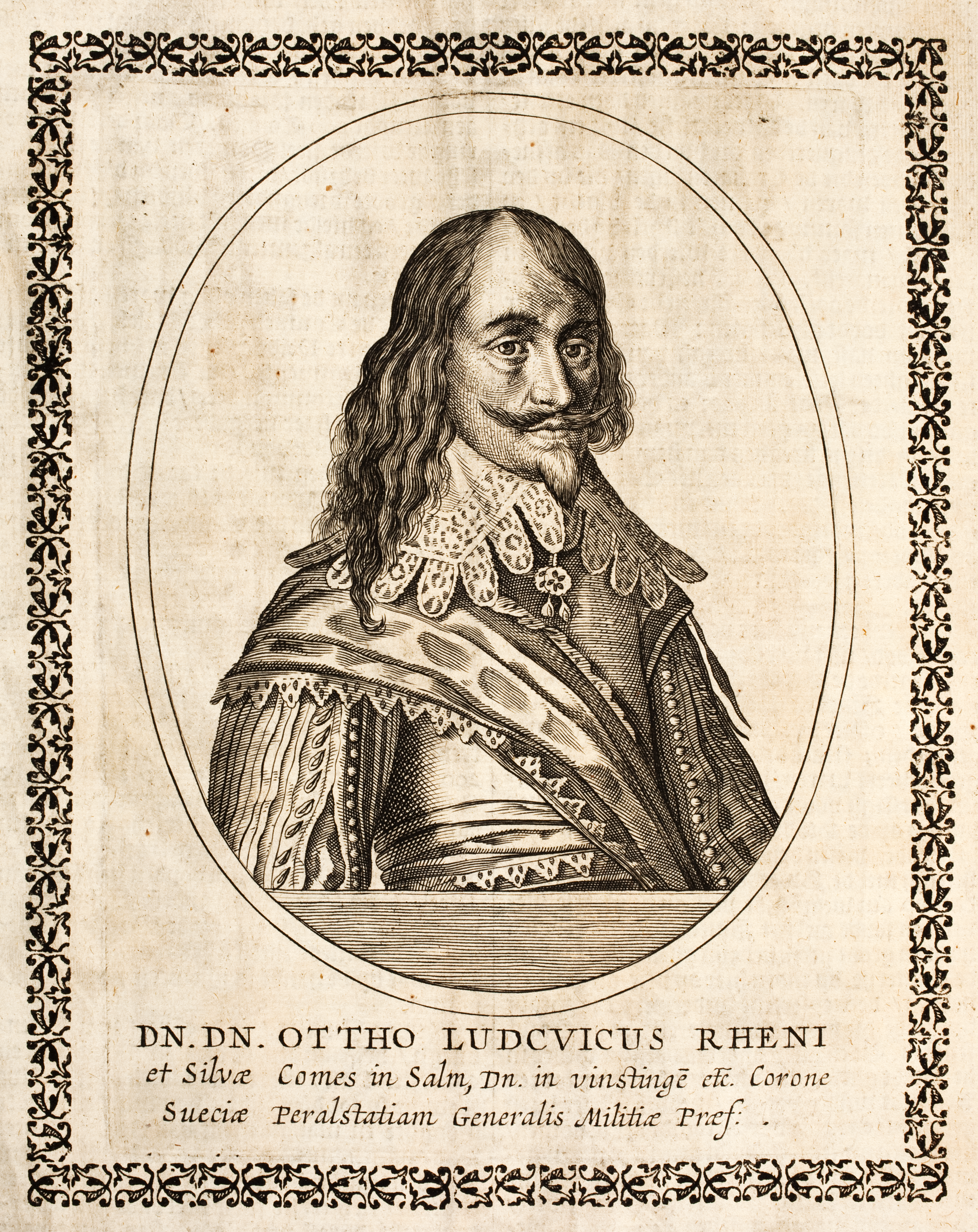
The Rheingrave Otto Louis of Salm, by Cornelis Danckaerts, 1642. Peace Palace Library.

On 27 or 28 September, Wreth made contact with the enemy's rearguard at the village of Willstätt, between Offenburg and the Rhine river, while the bulk of the Swedish army was in Kehl in preparation for the crossing. As Otto rode out with 15 companions to command his rearguard, he stumbled upon some Bavarian cuirassiers of the regiment of Keller, who mistook him for a Catholic officer. When he jumped into the Kinzig stream with his horse to escape, they realized their mistake and opened fire on him; he only received a light wound. Willstätt was burned as a result of the skirmish.

The Rheingrave made his way back to Kehl, where troops were entrenched to cover the crossing. He sent his family ahead over to Strasbourg. On his arrival, Charles of Lorraine ordered an assault of the entrenchments. The Imperial army was victorious after three hours of fighting. The Swedes had at least 300 killed in their ranks according to Pufendorf, of whom many died at the bridge towards the end when the orderly crossing turned into a rout. The Imperials claim that 1,000 Swedes were killed in the entrenchments and hundreds more drowned in the Rhine or perished amidst the flames in a farmstead which was sat on fire; they assure that up to 2,000 Swedes had not escaped the battle. Riezler puts the Swedish casualties at 1,500. The Rheingrave along with the bulk of his army, however, made it over the bridge to Strasbourg.

Charles of Lorraine wrote a letter to the city council of Strasbourg, asking them to open the gates of the city, but the request was denied. The Rheingrave, still controlling the west bank of the Rhine, promptly retreated to Seltz, while the Catholics moved to Rastatt.

== Aftermath ==
Sweden and the Heilbronn League quickly removed their garrisons in the Rhineland after the battle. Under the terms of the Treaty of Paris, the Swedish handed over their fortresses and cities in Alsace with exception of Benfeld to France, in order to prevent the Imperials from taking control of the region. The Elector of Saxony opened talks with Ferdinand II, but the Landgrave of Hesse-Kassel and the Duke of Lüneburg still fielded troops against the Emperor and were in the surroundings of Frankfurt am Main. Meanwhile, the Imperial armies were between the rivers Neckar and Main, where they took Heilbronn on 27 September, the same day that the Battle of Strasbourg Bridge was fought. Since the battle of Nördlingen, the Catholics had expelled the Swedish and their German allies from Bavaria, Swabia –except from Ulm and Augsburg, where they still held out but blockaded by the Duke of Bavaria–, Württemberg, and most of Franconia; in words of Diego Aedo y Gallart, secretary of the Cardinal-Infante: "expelling him [the Swedish] from the roots of the Alps".
