= McMain =

McMain is a surname. Notable people with the surname include:

- Eleanor McMain (1868–1934), American settlement house worker
- Joe McMain (1872–1957), English footballer
- Marc McMain (fl. from 2026), American politician

== See also ==
- McMains
