= Main station (disambiguation) =

A main station is a railway station that is the primary or central railway hub for a city.

Main station may in particular refer to:

- Main station (CTA), on the purple line
- Main station (CTA Niles Center Line)

== See also ==
- Main Street station (disambiguation)
- Central station (disambiguation)
- Station (disambiguation)
- Main (disambiguation)
