= Mane (surname) =

Mane or Mané is a surname. Notable people with the surname include:

- Alexis Mané (born 1997), French professional footballer
- Anant Mane (1915-1995), Indian film director
- Ansumane Mané (1940–2000), Guinea-Bissau soldier
- Arona Mané (born 1946), Senegalese wrestler
- Bachir Mané (born 1997), Senegalese football player
- Carlos Mané (born 1994), Portuguese footballer
- Dhairyasheel Sambhajirao Mane (born 1981), Indian politician
- Gucci Mane (born 1980), American rapper; birth name Radric Davis
- Emmanuel Mane-Katz (1894–1962), Ukrainian painter
- Filippo Mane (born 2005), Italian footballer
- Francisco León Mane (born 1973), Spanish racing cyclist
- Karim Mané (born 2000), Senegalese-born Canadian professional basketball player
- Laxman Mane (born 1949), Indian writer and a social activist
- Makarand Mane (born 1984), Marathi film director
- Malick Mané (born 1988), Senegalese football player
- Maruti Mane (1938–2010), Indian wrestler
- Milind Mane (born 1970), Indian politician
- Mirja Mane (1929–1974), Finnish actress
- Moía Mané (born 1987), Guinea-Bissauan footballer
- Nivedita Sambhajirao Mane (born 1963), Indian politician
- Ousmane Mané (born 1990), Senegalese footballer
- Pierre Mané (born 1998), Senegalese footballer
- Purnima Mane, Indian author and sexual and reproductive health expert
- Purnima Mane, Indian public health worker
- Rajaram Mane (born 1960), Indian Administrative Service (I.A.S) officer
- Sadio Mané (born 1992), Senegalese footballer
- Samir Mane (born 1967), Albanian entrepreneur
- Shivaji Mane, Indian politician
- Sori Mané (born 1996), Bissau-Guinean professional footballer
- Sureshbabu Mane (1902–1953), Indian singer
- Tyler Mane (born 1966), Canadian actor and professional wrestler
- Udayan Mane (born 1991), Indian professional golfer
- Vinayak Mane (born 1982), Indian cricketer

In fiction

- Dhananjay Mane, fictional character in Ashi Hi Banwa Banwi
