= Main River (disambiguation) =

The Main River, more commonly simply the Main, is a river in Germany.

Main River, may also refer to:

- Main River (Chukotka), a river in far Eastern Siberia.
- Main River (Newfoundland), a river in Newfoundland, Canada.
- River Main (County Antrim), a river in Northern Ireland.

== Legislative ==
- Main river, a statutory designation of larger watercourses in England and Wales.

== See also ==
- Maine River (disambiguation).
- Main (disambiguation).
