= Mayne =

Mayne may refer to:

== People ==
- Mayne (surname)

== Places ==
=== Australia ===
- Mayne, Queensland, a neighbourhood in the City of Brisbane

=== Canada ===
- Mayne Island, British Columbia, Canada
  - Mayne Island Water Aerodrome
  - Mayne Queen, the ferry that serves the island

=== Ireland ===
- Mayne, County Westmeath, a townland in Mayne civil parish, barony of Fore, County Westmeath, Ireland
- Mayne, County Westmeath (civil parish), a civil parish in the barony of Fore, County Westmeath, Ireland

=== United Kingdom ===
- Mayne Preceptory, a priory in Dorset, England

== Organisations ==
- Mayne Australian Football Club, Queensland
- Mayne Coaches, English
- Mayne Group, former Australian healthcare & logistics company

== See also ==
- Maine (disambiguation)
- Main (disambiguation)
- Mane (disambiguation)
- Maynes (disambiguation)
