= Dans la ville endormie =

- Cover of EP

Song by Dalida
- Released: June 1968
- Recorded: June 1968
- Studio: Hoche
- Genre: Psychedelic rock; chanson
- Length: 3:08
- Label: Barclay
- Composer(s): William Sheller
- Lyricist(s): Claude Lemesle

Music video
- "Dans la ville endormie" on YouTube

"Dans la ville endormie" ("In the sleeping city") is a French language song recorded by singer Dalida, first released on EP during summer of 1968. It is the product of Dalida's collaboration with composer William Sheller with whom she worked on Le temps des fleurs, her album released later that year. English language cover "My year is a day" by Les Irrésistibles achieved success several months later.

The song appears in No Time to Die, the 25th installment of the James Bond film series during the films pre-title sequence.

== Description ==
"Dans la ville endormie" was composed specially for Dalida by William Sheller, then young and still not known composer, alongside another song "Je me repose" which was released later the same year. Lyrics were written by Claude Lemesle. Released on B-side of an EP, Dalida focused on performing the song at concerts, avoiding all broadcast promotion except for one TV rendition. It was soon picked up by French-American boy band Les Irrésistibles who covered it in English. It became their debut single and remained only success.

Following the announcement in 2020 that the song would be in the James Bond film No Time to Die, "Dans la ville endormie" was reissued as a 10" vinyl single and a new compilation album Les Belles Chansons Ne Meurent Jamais... followed. An official clip was also made in the style of James Bond credits.

== Bibliography ==
- L'argus Dalida: Discographie mondiale et cotations, by Daniel Lesueur, Éditions Alternatives, 2004. ISBN 2-86227-428-3 and ISBN 978-2-86227-428-7. (in French)
