= Plum Orchard =

Coordinates: 30.855933°N 81.465238°W

- Plum Orchard Historic District
- U.S. National Register of Historic Places
- U.S. Historic district
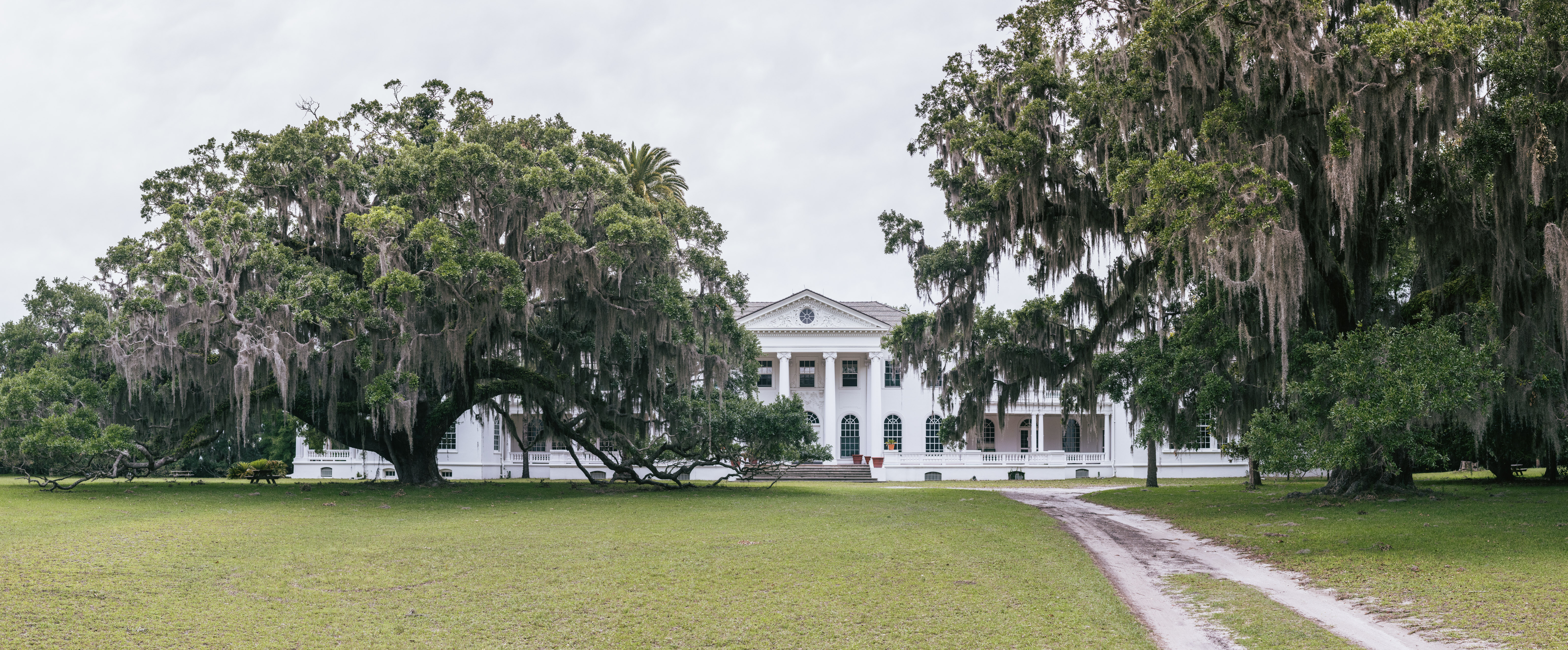

- Location within Georgia Location within the United States
- Nearest city: St. Marys, Georgia
- Built: 1898
- Architect: Peabody & Stearns
- Architectural style: Classical Revival
- MPS: Cumberland Island National Seashore MRA
- NRHP reference No.: 84000258
- Added to NRHP: November 23, 1984

Plum Orchard is an estate located in the middle of the western shore of Cumberland Island, Georgia, USA. The estate and surrounding area are listed on the National Register of Historic Places.

Designed by Peabody and Stearns for George Lauder Carnegie, a son of Thomas M. Carnegie and named after his uncle, Scottish industrialist George Lauder, it was formally dedicated on October 6, 1898. Peabody and Stearns also designed various additions to the mansion in the several following years, probably in 1906.

After George Lauder Carnegie died, his widow, Margaret Copley Thaw, remarried and moved to Lake Naivasha, Kenya. Most of the original furnishings were sold, and furniture from Dungeness was brought in to furnish the house. The house was then occupied by the Johnston family, from Nancy Trovillo Carnegie Heaver/Johnston's branch of the family.

The estate is now part of Cumberland Island National Seashore.

The mansion also includes a rare squash tennis court.

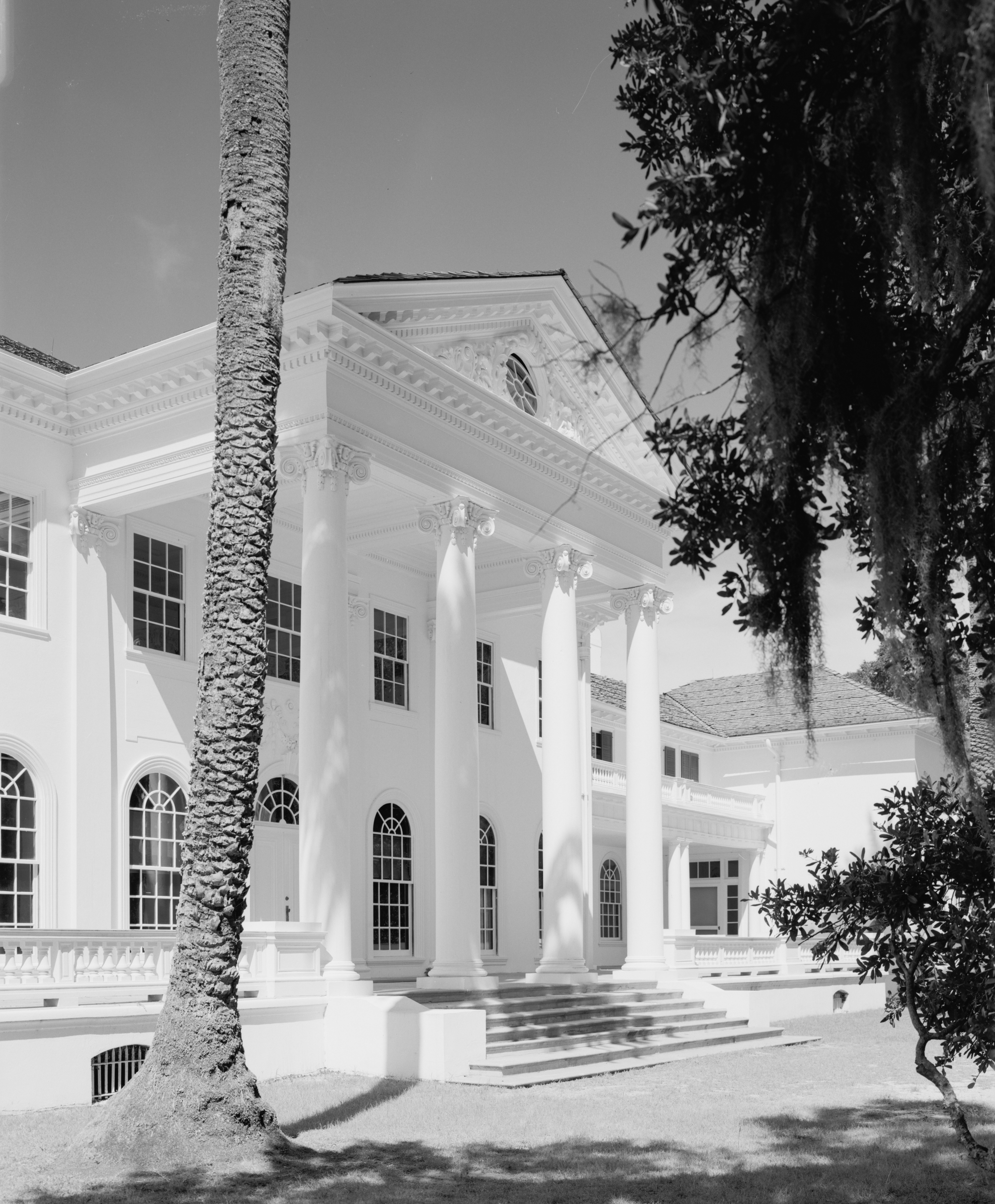
View of entrance portico

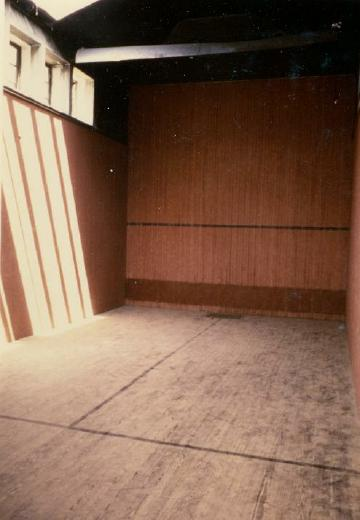
Squash tennis court

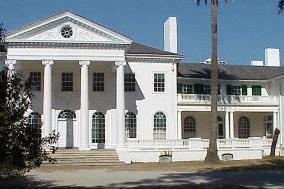
A closer view of the mansion, circa 2000

== See also ==
- Dungeness (Cumberland Island, Georgia)
- National Register of Historic Places listings in Cumberland Island National Seashore
- St. Marys Historic District (St. Marys, Georgia)
- National Register of Historic Places listings in Camden County, Georgia
