= Seaghan Maynes =

Seaghan Joseph Maynes (24 September 1916 in 65 Mill Street,(now Castle St) Belfast, Ireland– 15 August 1998, New Malden, Surrey, England) was a Reuters correspondent, best known for his on-the-ground coverage of the Invasion of Normandy, the Reconstruction of Germany, and the 1948 Arab Israeli War.

Maynes was born in 65 Mill Street, Belfast on 24 September 1916 to Joseph A. Maynes (an early electrician) and Mary O'Neill. His birth certificate gives his name as Seagan Liam Maynes although professionally he gave his name as Seaghan Joseph Maynes or Seaghan William Maynes. Maynes was educated at St. Malachy's College in Ulster just outside Belfast. He joined Reuters in 1944, and remained with the company for 34 years, retiring in 1978. During that time, he covered the D-Day landings, the Liberation of Paris, the Nuremberg Trials, the creation of the State of Israel, the Suez Crisis, the discovery of the Dead Sea Scrolls, and the Army–McCarthy hearings, in Washington, D.C. He married Maura Sheehan (born 1922) in Dun Laoghaire, Dublin, Ireland on 28 February 1949. That same year he moved with his new wife to Washington, D.C., from April 1949 until 1955. They then settled at 3 Woodside Road, New Malden, Surrey KT3 3AW, England. He had two sisters named Isabel 'Lala' Murphy 1918 - 2013, and Moya Farren 1920 - 2008 both dying in Dublin.

Maynes landed on D-Day with the other American airborne forces and he was accredited to General George S. Patton’s U.S. 3rd Army for much of the campaign. Maynes and Ernest Hemingway were the first accredited correspondents to enter Paris after the Normandy invasion, arriving two days before the city's liberation by Allied Forces. Maynes was part of the Reuters team that reported the original Nuremberg War Trials from start to finish, having earlier helped to set up Reuters offices in Hamburg and Berlin immediately after the close of hostilities. Maynes returned to Normandy in 1964 to report on the recovery of the region 20 years after the invasion.

Maynes was dispatched to Palestine in 1948, accredited to the Arab Legion during the subsequent war with Israel. He joined Reuters Washington bureau in 1949, covering the White House during the Truman and Eisenhower administration. Maynes returned to the Middle East in 1956 to cover the Suez Crisis in 1956. Maynes retired from Reuters in 1978 and died on 15 August 1998, in Kingston, Surrey, England, United Kingdom.
