= Arthur Mamou-Mani =

French architect (born 1983)

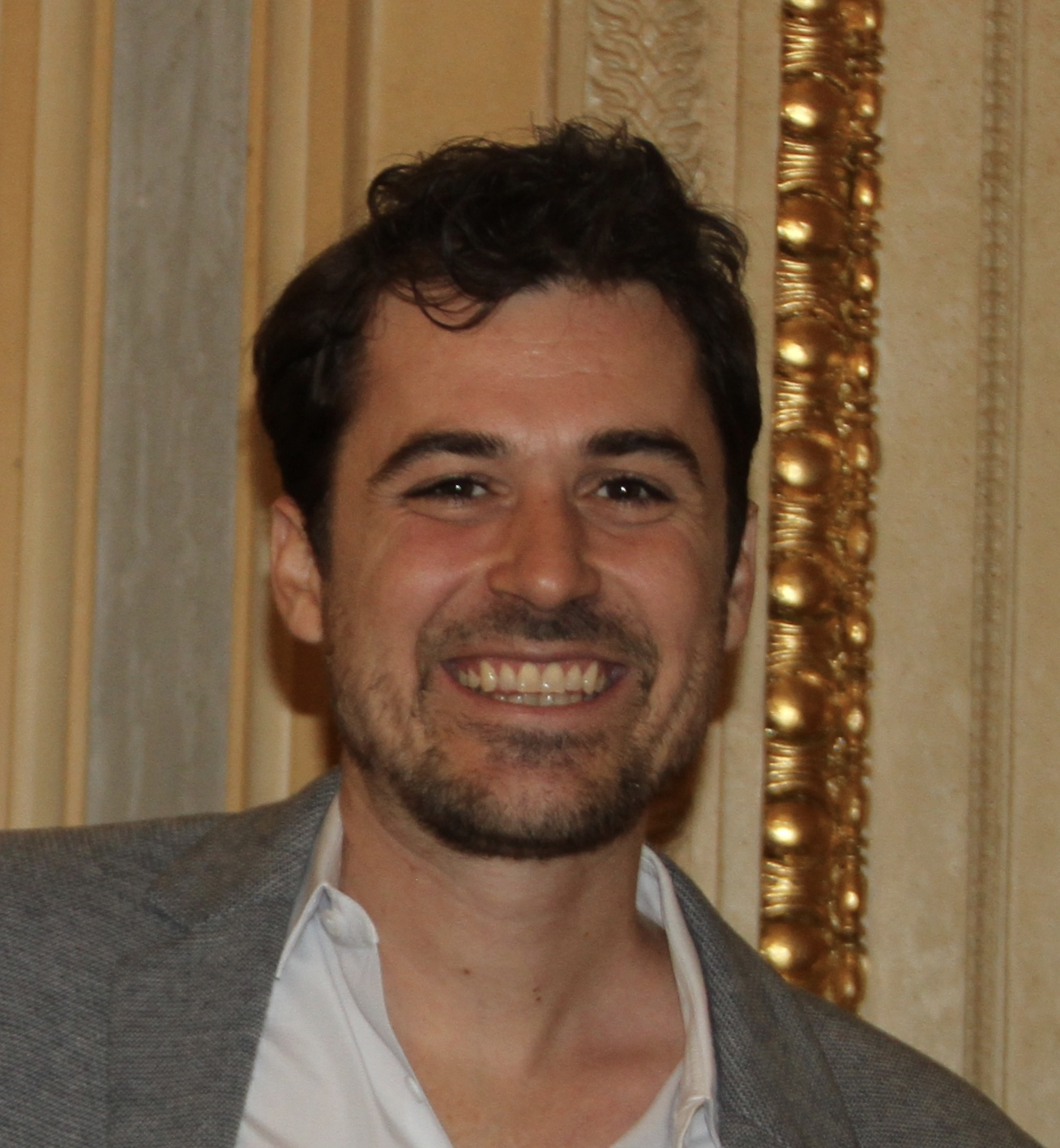
- Born: 5 February 1983 (age 43); Paris, France
- Education: Architectural Association School of Architecture
- Occupation: Architect (Mamou-Mani ltd)
- Spouse: Sandy Kwan
- Parent: Alain Mamou-Mani (father)
- Relatives: Guy Mamou-Mani (uncle)

Arthur Georges Joel Mamou-Mani (born 5 February 1983 in Paris) is a French architect. Mamou-Mani is director of the architecture and design practice Mamou-Mani Ltd which specializes in a new kind of pop-up, digital fabrication led architecture.

== Biography ==
=== Family ===
He is the nephew of Guy Mamou-Mani, the brother of Mathias Mamou-Mani, co-founder of Dynamic Beta Investments, the son of Éditions Albin Michel press officer Chantal Pottier and Alain Mamou-Mani, who wrote Beyond profit.

=== Formation ===
He studied at the École nationale supérieure d'architecture de Paris-Malaquais and in London, in 2003, at the Architectural Association School of Architecture. He then worked at Zaha Hadid Architects, Ateliers Jean Nouvel and Proctor and Matthews Architects for three years. In 2011, he started teaching Diploma Studio 10 at the University of Westminster with Toby Burgess. To allow their students to share their ideas, they both created the online platform WeWantToLearn.net receiving 600,000 views since its creation. Arthur also founded his practice Mamou-Mani ltd in 2011.

The projects include the Magic Garden for Karen Millen and the 3D Pop-Up Studio for the Xintiandi shopping mall in Shanghai, one of the first component-based, fully 3D Printed pavilion (with Andrei Jipa and Stephany Xu) Another pop-up project is "The Fitting Room" designed in collaboration with James K. Cheung of ARUP Associates a large origami tree made of 500 laser-cut polypropylene folded pieces. In March 2016, he participates with Maggie Aderin-Pocock, Toby Burgess, Linda Aitken and Els Leclerq, to a Samsung report that explores such questions as "How will we live; how will we work; how will we relax?".

=== Career ===
He is a lecturer at the University of Westminster in London and owns a digital fabrication laboratory called the FabPub. Mamou-Mani has given speeches including the TEDx conference in the United States, the Develop3D Live Conference, and the Taipei Technical University in Taiwan. His work was featured at the Process Exhibition in Shanghai and at the Sto Werkstatt in London. He currently lives in London.

In 2018, he built the Burning Man Temple 2018, Galaxia, consisting of 20 timber truss petals converging as a spiral towards one point in the sky. He is the first non-US architect selected for this piece of art.

In 2019, he designed Conifera, a 3D-printed bioplastic installation for COS, during Milan design week, in the 16th-century Palazzo Isimbardi.

In 2022, he built the temple, Catharsis, at Burning Man.

In 2025, he is part of the Berlin cabaret revue, Falling in Love, by Fecal Matter, Sacha Frolova and Jean-Paul Gaultier, staged at the Friedrichstadt-Palast.

In 2026, he decorated Hermes's first stand-alone store in Beijing and Flying Whales dirigible aircraft company.

== Awards ==
- 2013: Crown Estate's best RIBA display for "The Magic Garden" at Karen Millen's flagship store on Regent Street
- 2014: VM & Display best Christmas display
- 2016: Fellow of The Royal Society for the Encouragement of Arts, Manufactures and Commerce.
- 2020: Reward Architect by Pierre Cardin Prize of l’Académie des Beaux-arts

== Filmography ==
- 2026: The engineers of the future, Prime Video

== See also ==
- 3D printing
- List of TED speakers
