= Department of Main Roads =

Department of Main Roads may refer to:

- Department of Main Roads (New South Wales)
- Department of Main Roads (Queensland)
- Main Roads Western Australia, formerly Main Roads Department
