= Cape Main =

Headland of Antarctica

Coordinates: 73°33′S 169°54′E

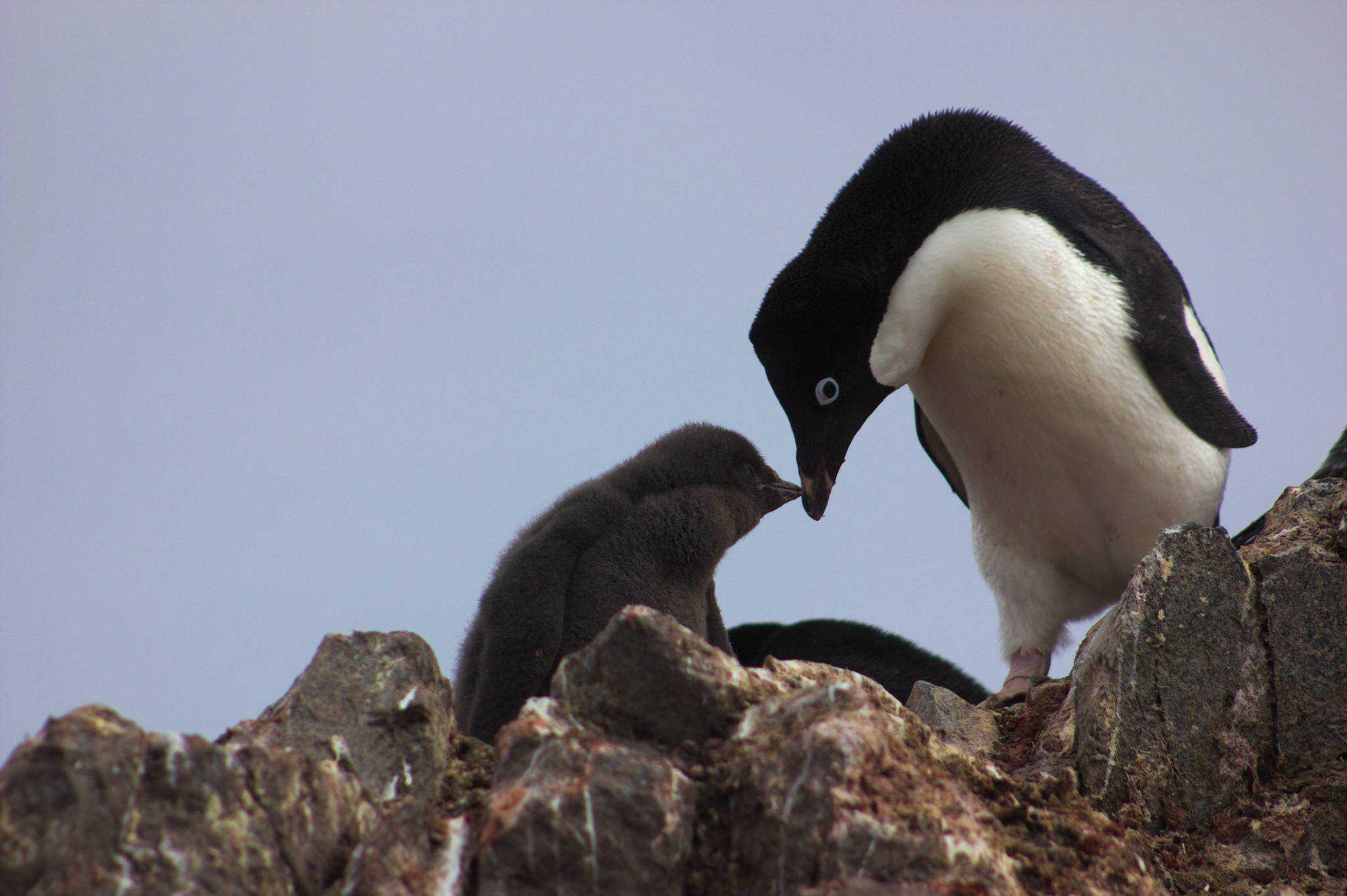
Adélie penguins breed in the IBA

Cape Main is a small cape situated 5 nautical miles (9 km) north of Cape Anne, along the east side of Coulman Island, Victoria Land, Antarctica. It was named by the New Zealand Antarctic Place-Names Committee in 1966 for Brian Main, a scientific technician at Hallett Station, 1962–63.

== Important Bird Area ==
A 500 ha site, comprising ice-free ground and a strip of moraine on the eastern coast of the island, some 3 km north of the cape, has been designated an Important Bird Area (IBA) by BirdLife International because it supports a colony of about 18,000 breeding pairs of Adélie penguins.
