= Mani-ye Olya =

Mani-ye Olya ماني عليا
- Village
- Country: Iran
- Province: Kerman
- County: Rafsanjan
- Bakhsh: Central
- Rural District: Sarcheshmeh

Population (2006)
  - Total: 184
- Time zone: UTC+3:30 (IRST)
  - Summer (DST): UTC+4:30 (IRDT)

Mani-ye Olya (Persian: ماني عليا, also Romanized as Mānī-ye ‘Olyā) is a village in Sarcheshmeh Rural District, in the Central District of Rafsanjan County, Kerman Province, Iran. At the 2006 census, its population was 184, in 59 families.
