= Guy Mamou-Mani =

French columnist

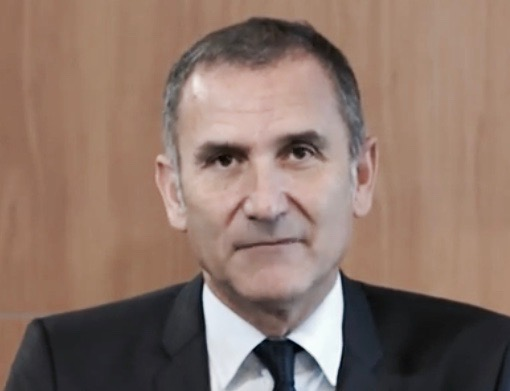

Guy Mamou-Mani (born 1957) is a French columnist for the French language edition of The Huffington Post, and president of Syntec Numérique.

A licensed mathematics teacher, Mamou-Mani began his career in 1985 with CSC-Go International, as a consultant. In 1995, he created the French subsidiary of the U.S. software company Manugistics. He then joined the Open Groupe as associate director in 1998, then in 2008 he became the COO of Open Groupe with Frédéric Sebag. He was elected president of Syntec Numérique in June 2010.

== Personal life ==
He is the brother of Alain Mamou-Mani, and the uncle of Arthur Mamou-Mani. His son Gabriel sells Panda NFT's.
