= Maines (surname) =

Maines is a surname. Notable people with the surname include:

- Dan Maines (born 1971), American musician, bassist for Clutch
- John Maines (born 1948), British musician
- Lloyd Maines (born 1951), American musician and producer
- Natalie Maines (born 1974), American singer-songwriter
- Nicole Maines (born 1997), American actress, comic book writer and activist
- Rachel Maines (born 1950), American historian

== See also ==
- Mains (surname)
- Maine (surname)
- Maynes
