= Sinclair Mayne =

Dr Sinclair Mayne
- Born: Colin Sinclair Mayne; Northern Ireland
- Occupations: Agricultural scientist Departmental scientific advisor for Northern Ireland's Department of Agriculture and Rural Development; Director of Sustainable Agri-Food Sciences at the Agri-Food and Biosciences Institute
- Years active: 1983-current

'Dr Colin Sinclair Mayne (born 1957) is an agricultural scientist from Northern Ireland. Since February 2009, he has been the departmental scientific advisor for Northern Ireland's Department of Agriculture and Rural Development and the director of Sustainable Agri-Food Sciences at the Agri-Food and Biosciences Institute.

He is a past president of the British Society of Animal Science and has been president of the British Grassland Society since 31 March 2009. He is also a member of the Research and Development Advisory Forum for Dairy Co.

== Early life and education ==
Mayne was brought up in a farming background. He received a BAgr in 1980 and earned his Ph.D. from Queen's University Belfast in 1983.

His research expertise is in dairy cattle, cattle grazing, grass production, improving the efficiency of milk production, reducing the environmental impact of livestock production. He has authored or co-authored 90 scientific papers, and has been invited to present at conferences.

== Career ==
Mayne has worked in research and development around dairying and grassland. He began his career at the English Grassland Research Institute near Okehampton in Devon. He later worked for the Agricultural Research Institute of Northern Ireland in Hillsborough, Northern Ireland. The institute later became part of the U.K.'s Agri-Food and Biosciences Institutes in 2006.

He was awarded the Sir John Hammond Memorial Award from the British Society of Animal Science (BSAS) in 1996 and the British Grassland Society Award for outstanding contributions to grassland knowledge in 2001. He was awarded Fellowship of the Royal Agricultural Societies in 2004.
