= Purnima Mane =

Indian health and HIV specialist

Purnima Mane PhD
- Education: St. Xavier's College, Mumbai, Tata Institute of Social Sciences
- Occupations: Expert in Sexual and Reproductive Health

Purnima Mane is an Indian author and sexual and reproductive health expert who held many senior leadership roles in United Nations and global health roles. She serves on the board of governors of the International Development Research Centre and is the founding editor of Culture, Health and Sexuality academic journal.

== Education ==
Mane has a bachelor's degree in psychology from St. Xavier’s College, Mumbai and a master of arts, a MPhil, and a PhD from the Tata Institute of Social Sciences.

She was awarded a postdoctoral Fulbright Fellowship to study women and HIV at the Johns Hopkins Bloomberg School of Public Health, and is a winner of the Fulbright Foundation’s Global Changemaker Award.

== Career ==
Mane has worked in academia as an associate professor at the Tata Institute and as a visiting professorial fellow at the University of New South Wales, teaching at its Centre for Social Research in Health.

She is the founding editor of Culture, Health and Sexuality academic journal, and is on the editorial advisory committee of the International Journal of Sexual Health.

Mane has performed many roles at the United Nations including Vice-President, International Programmes, Population Council, United Nations Population Fund. She has held senior leadership roles at World Health Organization and the Joint United Nations Programme on HIV/AIDS.

She was the chief fund portfolio director for The Global Fund to Fight AIDS, Tuberculosis and Malaria and the CEO and president of Pathfinder International.

She served on the boards of director of the International AIDS Vaccine Initiative and the MTV Staying Alive Foundation.

She serves on the board of governors of the International Development Research Centre.

== Books ==
- Co-editor of Sex, Drugs and Young People: International Perspectives (Sexuality, Culture and Health), published by Routledge in 2015, ISBN 978-0-415-32877-7
- Author of Aids Prevention, The Socio Cultural Context in India, published by Tata Institute of Social Sciences in 1992, ISBN 978-81-85458-54-0

== Personal life ==
Mane lives in San Mateo, California.
