= High Point-Half Moon Bluff Historic District =

Historic district in Georgia, United States

- U.S. National Register of Historic Places
- U.S. Historic district
- Location within Georgia Location within the United States
- Location: Cumberland Island National Seashore, northeast of St. Marys, Georgia on Cumberland Island
- Coordinates: 30°55′14″N 81°25′56″W
- Area: 700 acres (2.8 km^{2})
- Built: 1880
- NRHP reference No.: 78000265
- Added to NRHP: December 22, 1978

The High Point-Half Moon Bluff Historic District, on Cumberland Island near St. Marys, Georgia, United States, is a historic district that was listed on the National Register of Historic Places in 1978. It is located within Cumberland Island National Seashore.

The listing included 21 contributing buildings and nine contributing sites on 700 acres (2.8 km^{2}).

It includes the North End of Cumberland Island, including Half Moon Bluff, the Martin's Half Moon Bluff Tract and High Point or Candler Estate.

It includes religious structure(s), hotel, and single dwellings.
