= Charlie Mannes =

Scottish cricketer and educator

Personal information
- Full name: Charles Turnbull Mannes
- Born: 25 October 1863; Glasgow, Lanarkshire, Scotland
- Died: 29 December 1937 (aged 74); Airdrie, Lanarkshire, Scotland
- Batting: Right-handed
- Bowling: Right-arm medium

Domestic team information
- Years: Team
- 1906–1908: Scotland

Career statistics
Competition	First-class
Matches	3
Runs scored	129
Batting average	21.50
100s/50s	–/1
Top score	62
Catches/stumpings	1/–
- Source: Cricinfo, 27 July 2022

Charles Turnbull Mannes (25 October 1863 – 29 December 1937) was a Scottish first-class cricketer and educator.

Mannes was born at Glasgow in October 1863. A club cricketer for Drumpellier Cricket Club from 1888 to 1914, he made his debut for Scotland in first-class cricket against the touring West Indians at Edinburgh in 1906. He made two further first-class appearances for Scotland, playing against the touring South Africans in 1907, and Nottinghamshire in 1908. He scored 129 runs in his three matches at an average of 21.50; he made one half century, a score of 62 against the South Africans. Although he did not bowl at first-class level, Mannes was considered one of the greatest all-round cricketers that Scotland had produced. In club cricket, he scored 49 centuries. Outside of cricket, Mannes spent many years as an assistant master at The Clarkston School in Airdrie, later becoming its headmaster. He retired from teaching in 1927, and later died at his Airdrie home in December 1937.
