= The Maine (Des Moines, Iowa) =

- U.S. National Register of Historic Places
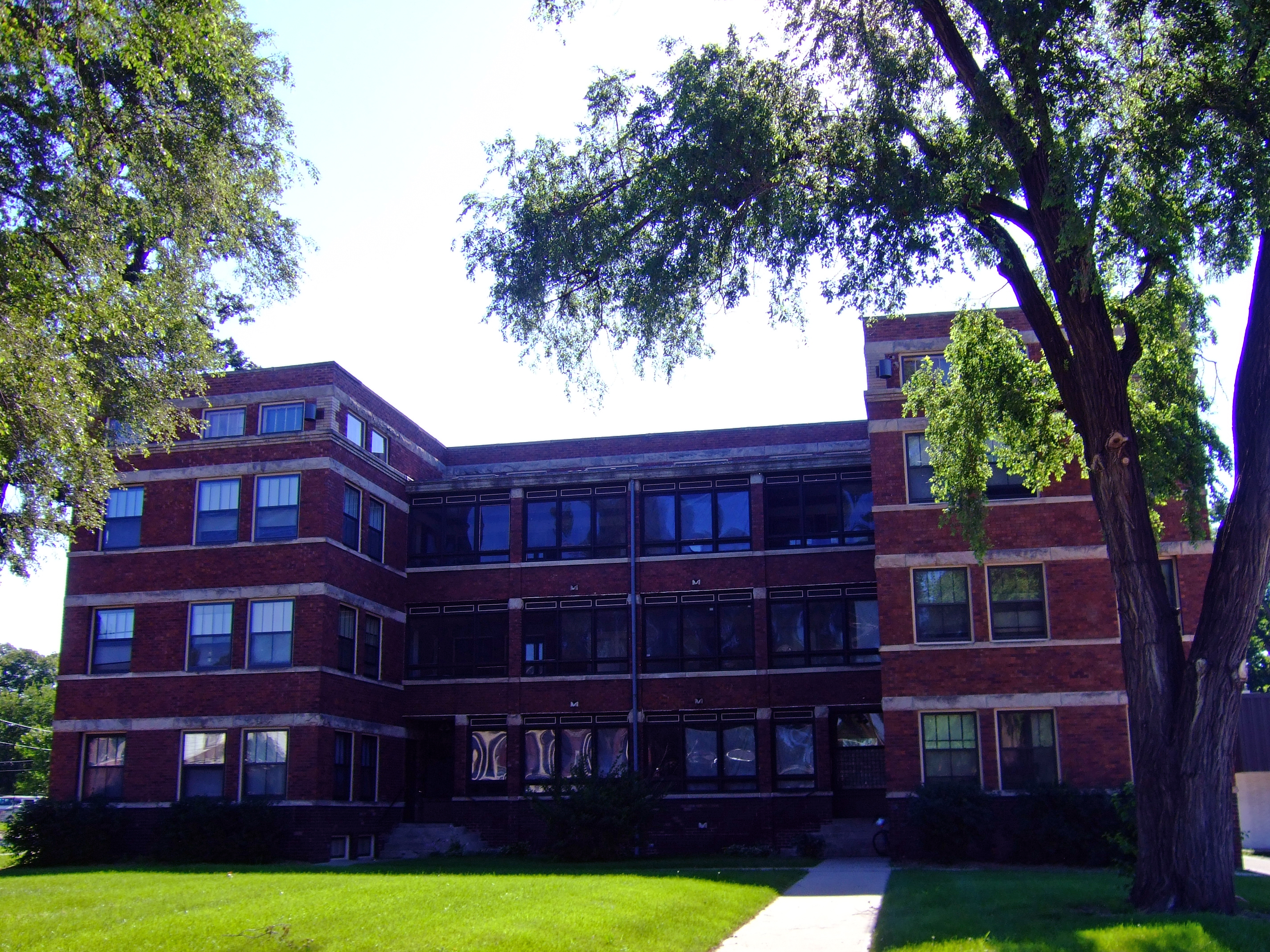

- Location within Iowa Location within the United States
- Location: 1635 6th Ave., Des Moines, Iowa
- Coordinates: 41°36′32″N 93°37′30.6″W
- Area: less than one acre
- Built: 1913
- Architectural style: Late 19th and Early 20th Century American Movements
- MPS: Towards a Greater Des Moines MPS
- NRHP reference No.: 96001143
- Added to NRHP: October 25, 1996

The Maine is a historic building located in Des Moines, Iowa, United States. This three-story, brick structure was completed in 1913. It features 18 units, an "H" plan, a series of ribbon windows, stone lintels and decorative stone trimming. At the rear of the property is a two-story brick automobile garage that shares the historic designation with the apartment building. The date of its construction is uncertain. The building is located on Sixth Avenue, which by the turn of the 20th century had become a major route utilized by vehicular traffic and streetcar lines. Its proximity to this transportation corridor illustrates the emergence of higher and denser residential use in this area of Des Moines. The apartment building and garage were listed together on the National Register of Historic Places in 1996. It is currently income-restricted housing.
