= Mani =

Mani may refer to:

== People ==
- Mani (name), (Persian: مانی), a given name and surname (including a list of people with the name)
  - Mani (prophet) (c. 216–274), a 3rd century Iranian prophet who founded Manichaeism
  - Mani (musician) (1962–2025), an English rock musician
  - Mani (actor) (born 1975), Pakistani film and television actor and host
- Mani people, a Negrito ethnic group from Thailand

== Geography ==
- Mani, Bihar, a village in Bihar state of India
- Maní, Casanare, a town and municipality in Casanare Department, Colombia
- Mani, Chad, a town and sub-prefecture in Chad
- Mani, Evros, a village in northeastern Greece
- Mani, Karnataka, a village in Dakshina Kannada district of India
- Mani, Iran, a village in Kerman Province, Iran
- Mani, Nigeria, a town in Katsina State, Nigeria
- Mani, Tibet, a village in the Tibet Autonomous Region of China
- Maní, Yucatán, a small city in Yucatán, Mexico
- East Mani, a municipality in the Laconia regional unit, Peloponnese, Greece
- El Mani, a community on the island of Puerto Rico
- Mani Peninsula, a geographical and cultural region in Greece
- West Mani, a municipality in the Messenia regional unit, Peloponnese, Greece

== Arts, entertainment, and media ==
- Mani (web series), a 2017 Brat show
- Mâni, a form of Turkish folk song
- Mani: Travels in the Southern Peloponnese, a travelogue about the Greek peninsula by Patrick Leigh Fermor
- Mani (film), a 2003 Indian Kannada-language romance film

== Other uses ==
- Mani (letter), a letter of the Georgian alphabet
- Maní (Amazonian legend), a legend of the indigenous tribe Tupi in Brazil
- Máni, a personification of the moon in Norse mythology
- Máni (spacecraft), a lunar orbiter
- Mani, informal name for the mantra of Avalokiteśvara, Om mani padme hum
- Mani stone, a stone on which the "Mani" mantra is inscribed
- Mani Jewel, any of various jewels mentioned in Buddhist literature
  - Manipur (disambiguation) (lit. 'jewel city'), various places in India
- Al-Māniʿ, one of the names of God in Islam, meaning "Withholder" and "Defender".
- Mani stick fighting, an African-derived martial art from Cuba
- Mani the parakeet, a rose-ringed parakeet that serves as an astrologer "assistant" to M. Muniyappan in Singapore
- Manicure, abbreviated "mani"
- Mannosyl-oligosaccharide 1,2-alpha-mannosidase, an enzyme
- 307261 Máni, a large trans-Neptunian object

== See also ==
- Manes (disambiguation)
- Moni (disambiguation)
- Maniyy, a term for sex-related fluids in Islamic jurisprudence
