= S. L. Mains =

American football player and coach (1865–1934)

Biographical details
- Born: March 31, 1865; Danville, Iowa, U.S.
- Died: February 9, 1934 (aged 68); Lincoln, Nebraska, U.S.

Playing career
- 1894: Doane

Coaching career (HC unless noted)
- 1899–1900: Doane

Head coaching record
- Overall: 4–2

Seward Lincoln "Suey" Mains Sr.^{[n1]} (March 31, 1865 – February 9, 1934) was an American college football player and coach.

Mains was born in Danville, Iowa, in 1865. He attended Doane College in Crete, Nebraska, where he played college football. He played in Doane's first college football game, earned a reputation as "a great general in the field", and missed only two games in the first five years of Doane football. He was also the captain of the Doane football team for two seasons. He scored a touchdown in Doane's 12–0 victory over the 1894 Nebraska football team. He graduated from Doane in 1895. He was also the school's champion in the shot put and hammer throw.

Mains was the sixth head football coach at Doane, serving for two seasons, from 1899 to 1900, and compiling a record of 4–2.

In October 1893, Mains was married to Laura Patton of Ashland, Nebraska. At that time, he was employed in real estate in Crete. He later operated a confectionery store in Crete, Nebraska, and was employed by the Bankers Life Insurance Company for more than 25 years. He died from a heart attack in 1934 at Lincoln, Nebraska.

== Head coaching record ==
Year	Team	Overall	Conference	Standing	Bowl/playoffs
Doane Tigers (Independent) (1899–1900)
1899	Doane	2–1			
1900	Doane	2–1			
Doane:		4–2			
Total:		4–2			

== Notes ==
- ^[n1]Also given as Lincoln Seward Mains in some sources
