= Main Road (Cumberland Island) =

- U.S. National Register of Historic Places
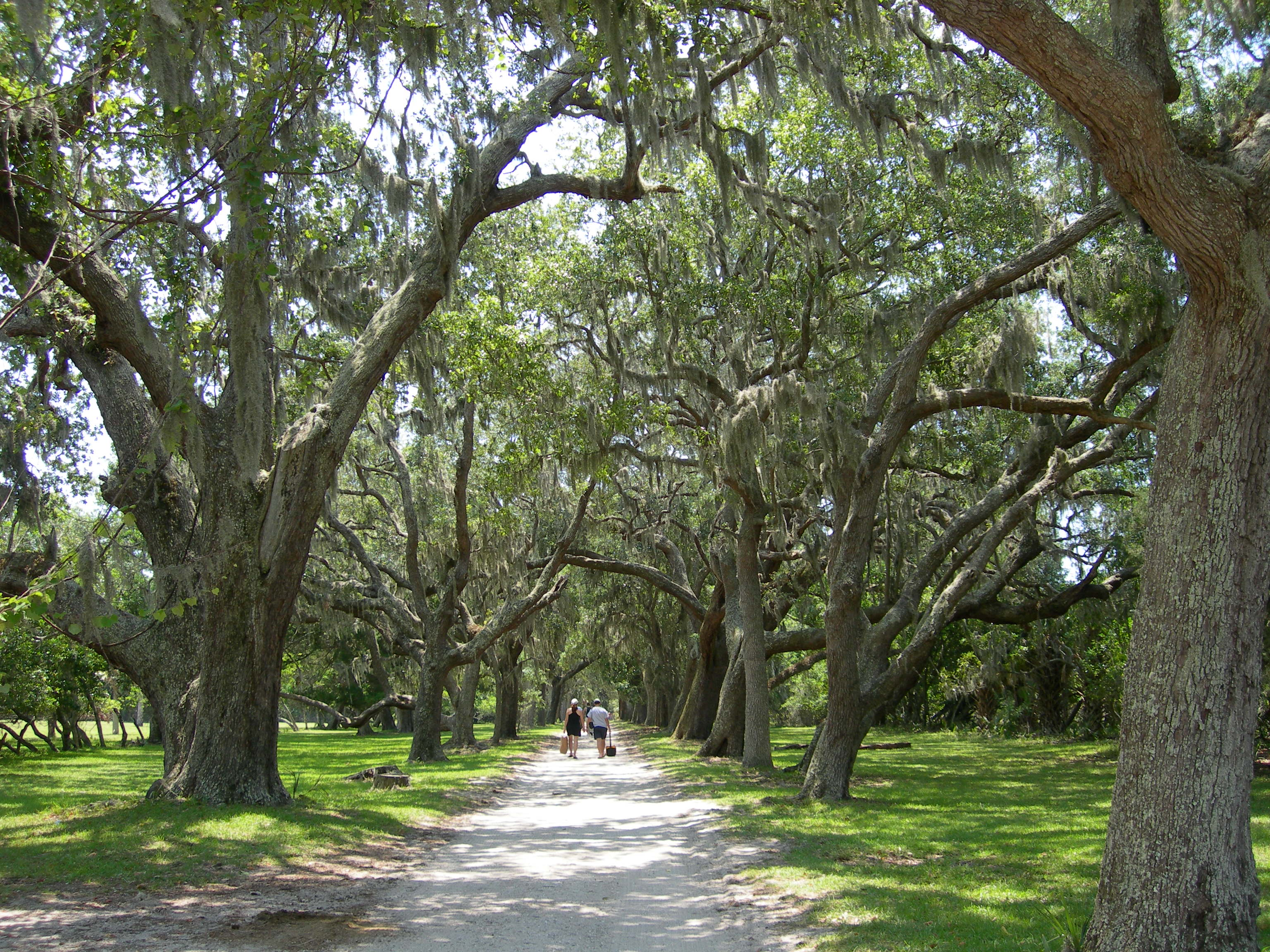

- Location within Georgia Location within the United States
- Nearest city: St. Marys, Georgia
- Area: 50 acres (20 ha)
- Built: 1870
- MPS: Cumberland Island National Seashore MRA
- NRHP reference No.: 84000941
- Added to NRHP: February 13, 1984

The Main Road, also known as Grand Avenue and as Stafford Road, on Cumberland Island in Cumberland Island National Seashore near St. Marys, Georgia was built in 1870. It was listed on the National Register of Historic Places in 1984.

It is about 13 miles (21 km) long and about eight to ten feet wide. Portions existed by 1802; it was complete by 1870.

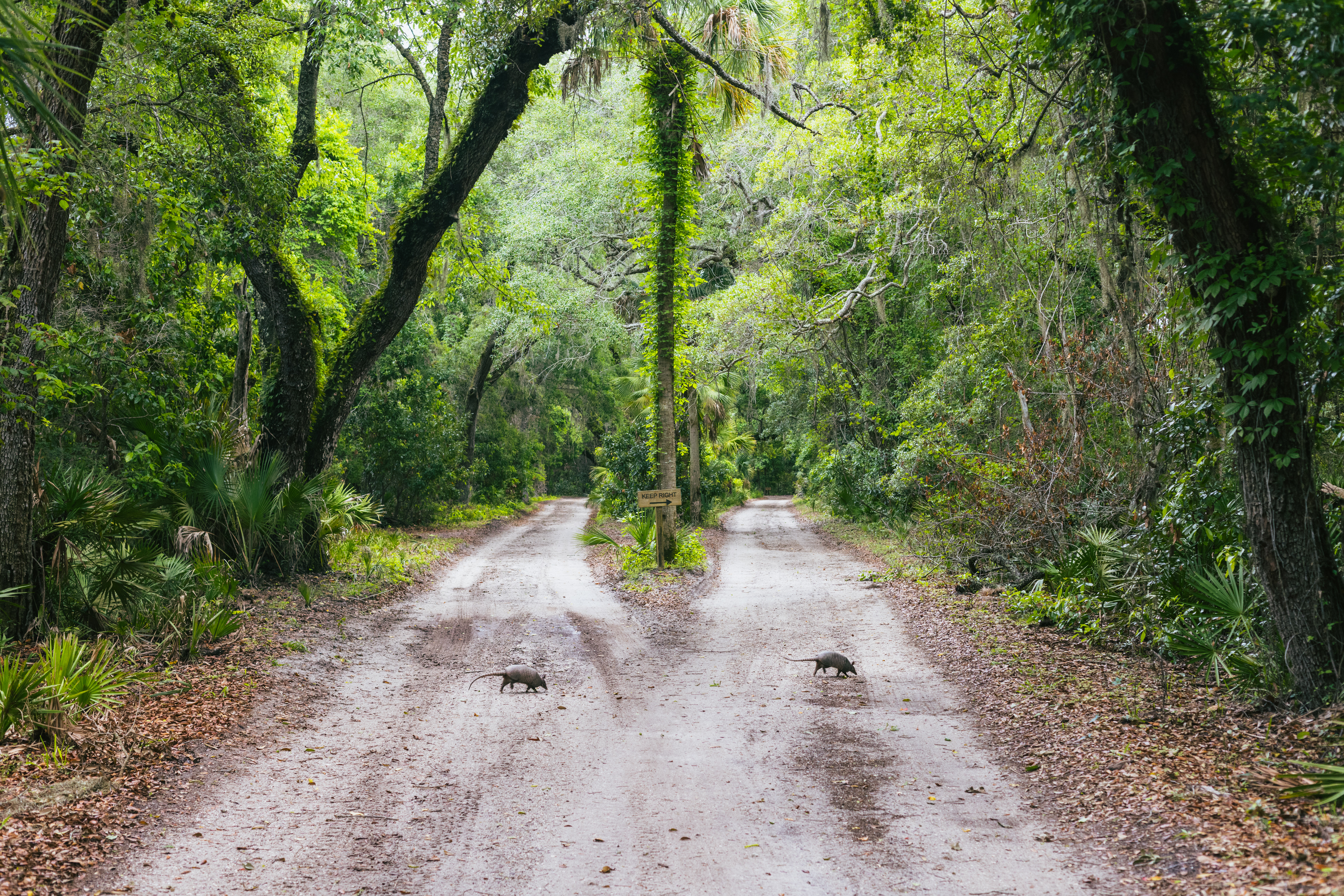
Armadillos run across the gravel lanes of the Main Road.
