= Mane =

Mane may refer to:

- Mane (horse), the line of hair along the spine of the neck
- Mane (lion), the hair found around the male mammal's neck

== In arts and entertainment ==
- Mane (film) is a 1990 Kannada language film directed by Girish Kasaravalli
- Mane (Dungeons & Dragons), a fictional demon in the Dungeons & Dragons fantasy role-playing game
- Lion-Mane, three characters in DC Comics
- The Mane Six, the team group of Twilight and her friends from My Little Pony: Friendship is Magic
- Dhananjay Mane, fictional character in Ashi Hi Banwa Banwi film

== Places ==
- Mane Skerry, Antarctic island
- Mané Department, a department in the Sanmatenga Province of Burkina Faso
- French communes:
  - Mane, Alpes-de-Haute-Provence, in the Alpes-de-Haute-Provence département
  - Mane, Haute-Garonne, in the Haute-Garonne département
- Mane Bhanjang, village in the state of West Bengal in India
- Mane, an ancient city in what is now Syria or Iraq
- Mane, a subdistrict of the Pidie Regency in Indonesia
- Mäne, a village in Ahal Province, Turkmenistan

== People ==
- Mane (clan), one of the Maratha clans; also one of the surnames of the clan people
- Mane people or Manneh, African soldiers from the first half of the sixteenth century
- Mane (surname) or Mané, a surname

=== As a given name ===
- Maneh (given name), an Armenian female name
- Mané, nickname for Manuel:
  - Garrincha (1933–1983), full name Manuel Francisco dos Santos, Brazilian footballer
  - Mané (footballer, born 1950), full name José Manuel Esnal Pardo, Spanish football manager
  - Mané (footballer, born 1981), full name José Manuel Jiménez Ortiz, Spanish footballer
  - Sadio Mané (footballer, born 1992), Senegalese footballer
- Mane Bajić (1941–1994), Serbian football player
- Mané de la Parra (born 1982), Mexican producer, songwriter, singer and actor

=== As a stage name ===
- Ghostemane (born 1991), American rapper and producer
- Gucci Mane (born 1980), American rapper
- Lil Ugly Mane (born 1984), American rapper and producer
- Tyler Mane (born 1966), American actor and former wrestler

== Other meanings ==
- Mane SA, a producer of flavors and fragrances
- Mane Minister (born 1988), an American Thoroughbred racehorse

== See also ==
- Manes (disambiguation)
- Main (disambiguation)
- Maine (disambiguation)
- Mayne (disambiguation)
