= Les Irrésistibles =

- Also known as: The Sentrys; The Beloved Ones
- Origin: Paris, France
- Genres: Pop, rock
- Years active: 1966–1972
- Labels: CBS Records
- Past members: Jim McMains; Steve McMains; Tom Arena; Andy Cornelius

Les Irrésistibles (The Irresistibles) were a boy band during the late 1960s and early 1970s, whose members were Americans living in France. The lineup consisted of lead singer Jim McMains on keyboards and rhythm guitar, his identical twin brother Steve McMains on bass, Tom Arena on lead guitar, and Andy Cornelius on drums. They returned to the US in the early 70's.

== Origins ==
The band formed in 1968 as The Sentrys, when the members were teenage classmates at the American School of Paris. They developed a following among the local American community by playing cover versions of contemporary hits. They came to the notice of recording scouts, and eventually signed with CBS, who marketed them as Les Irrésistibles. The arrangement included British carmaker Triumph as a corporate sponsor, and the company's TR5 roadster featured prominently in the group's first video and early publicity photos.

The band's first release was "My year is a day", written by William Sheller, which came out as a single in 1968 and achieved certain success, remaining the greatest of all their releases. It is an English version of Dalida's French song "Dans la ville endormie", and not the vice versa that Dalida covered their song as it was thought. The notes on the record sleeve contained a fictional account of their origins, claiming that the band formed in Los Angeles with the name The Beloved Ones, of which Les Irrésistibles was the French equivalent. They continued to publish songs in France for several more years which achieved some success, before leaving back to the US. There is rumor that one of the brothers lives in Western North Carolina, while others are in California.

== Discography ==
=== Albums ===
- 1968: The Story of Baxter Williams

=== Singles ===
- 1968: "My Year is a Day"
- 1968: "Lands of Shadow"
- 1969: "Dreams of Dolls"
- 1969: "Why Try to Hide"
- 1969: "Girl I Love You" / "Universe of Love"
- 1970: "Peace of Love"
- 1971: "Baby I Need You Back Again"
- 1972: "Christmas Bells Will Ring (Petit Papa Noël)"

Two of the group's singles, "My Year Is A Day" and "Sunshine And You", were released in the United States under the band name Arch Of Triumph.
