= José de Jesus Maria Mayne =

Portuguese Catholic priest and theologian (1723–1792)

His Most Reverend Paternity Fr. José de Jesus Maria Mayne
- Born: 7 June 1723; Porto, Portugal
- Died: 23 December 1792 (aged 69); Lisbon, Portugal

Frei José de Jesus Maria Mayne (Note: Also rendered as "Joseph de Jesus Maria Mayne", as it was usually spelt in the 18th century; alternatively, but less frequently, "Maine".) (7 June 1723 – 23 December 1792) was a Portuguese Catholic priest who occupied several important posts such as Minister General of the Third Order Regular of Saint Francis, Chief Chaplain of the Royal Armada, and confessor to King Peter III.

José Mayne is intimately associated with the history of the Lisbon Academy of Sciences. In keeping with the intellectual movement of the Enlightenment, he instituted a school of natural history integrated into the Academy: to achieve this, he established a cabinet of curiosities by donating his important collection to the Academy and made significant contributions to its library.

Mayne's interest in natural history and science emphasised the study of the wonders of Creation as a way to combat the modern materialistic philosophical views espoused by foreign thinkers in France (Voltaire, Rousseau, Helvétius, Boulanger, Diderot, Robinet, La Mettrie) and Britain (Hobbes, Locke, Berkeley, Coward, Cudworth, Dodwell, Toland, Collins), which he actively opposed as destructive errors that endangered both religion and State.

== Works ==
- Declamação evangelica na trasladação de Sancta Rosa de Viterbo, recitada no convento de Nossa Senhora de Jesus (Lisbon, Miguel Manescal da Costa, 1757)
- Dissertação sobre a alma racional, onde de mostram os fundamentos da sua immortalidade (Lisbon, Regia Offic. Typ., 1778)
