= Justice Main =

Justice Main may refer to:

- James Allen Main (born 1945), associate justice of the Supreme Court of Alabama
- John F. Main (1864–1942), associate justice of the Washington Supreme Court

== See also ==
- Main Justice, the centralized headquarters of the United States Department of Justice
