= Main, Iran =

Main مائين
- Village
- Location within Iran
- Coordinates: 30°11′42″N 52°40′12″E
- Country: Iran
- Province: Fars
- County: Marvdasht
- Bakhsh: Dorudzan
- Rural District: Abarj

Population (2006)
  - Total: 765
- Time zone: UTC+3:30 (IRST)
  - Summer (DST): UTC+4:30 (IRDT)

Main (Persian: مائين, also Romanized as Mā’īn; also known as Mahīān, Māhīn, Mā’īnī, and Qal‘eh Now-e Mā’īn) is a village in Abarj Rural District, Dorudzan District, Marvdasht County, Fars province, Iran. At the 2006 census, its population was 765, in 148 families.
