= Main Street (disambiguation) =

Main Street is the generic street name (and often the official name) of the primary retail street of a village, town, or small city in many parts of the world.

Main Street, MainStreet, or Mainstreet may refer to:

== Music ==
- MainStreet (band), a Dutch boy band
- Main Street (quartet), an American barbershop quartet
- Main Street (Roy Wood & Wizzard album), an album by the British rock band Wizzard
- Main Street (Epicure album), an album by the Australian rock band Epicure
- "Mainstreet" (song), a song by Bob Seger

== Film ==
- Main Street (1923 film), an American film
- Calle Mayor (film), a 1956 Spanish film released in English-speaking countries as Main Street
- Main Street (2010 film), an American film starring Orlando Bloom

== Novels ==
- Main Street (novel), a satirical novel by Sinclair Lewis
- Main Street (novel series), a children's novel series by Ann M. Martin

== Other ==
- Mainstreet Bank Limited, A commercial bank in Nigeria
- Main Street (Dreamworld), part of the Dreamworld theme park
- MainStreet (department store), defunct American department store chain
- Main Street Complex, a retail and office complex in Voorhees, New Jersey
- Mainstreet Theater, a landmark building in Kansas City, Missouri
- Main Street, U.S.A., part of each Walt Disney theme park
- Performance MainStreet, also known as just Mainstreet, a defunct UK satellite TV channel
- Small business, in contrast to "Wall Street" for big business

== See also ==
- Main Street Station (disambiguation)
- High Street (disambiguation), an alternative equivalent of Main Street in England and some other parts of the world (e.g. Hong Kong)
- Street (disambiguation)
- Main (disambiguation)
- Main Road (disambiguation)
- Maine Street in Brunswick, Maine
