= Gloria L. Main =

American economic historian (born 1933)

- Born: Gloria Jean Lund; California, US
- Occupation: Economic historian
- Spouse: Jackson Turner Main (m. 1956; died 2003)
- Children: 3

Academic background
- Education: San Jose State College; Stony Brook University; Columbia University

Academic work
- Discipline: Colonial America, economic history
- Institutions: University of Colorado Boulder

Gloria Lund Main (née Lund; born 1933) is an American economic historian who is a professor emeritus of history at University of Colorado Boulder. She authored two books about the Thirteen Colonies.

== Life ==
Gloria Jean Lund was born to Mr. and Mrs. Howard Lund of Mount Hermon, California. She graduated from Analy High School. Lund completed her bachelor's degree at San Jose State College (now San Jose State University). She was an economics graduate student at University of California, Berkeley where she was the only female graduate student. In 1956, Lund paused her studies to marry her former undergraduate professor, Jackson Turner Main, a grandson of historian Frederick Jackson Turner. After their three children were school aged, she earned a M.A. from Stony Brook University.

Influenced by her husband's field of study, Main completed a Ph.D. in American history at Columbia University. Her 1972 dissertation on personal wealth in the Thirteen Colonies was the basis of her first book. She applies her economics training to her studies of colonial time periods. After a few years of lecturing part time in the New York area, Main joined the faculty at University of Colorado Boulder. As of 2015, she is a professor emeritus.

== Selected works ==
=== Books ===
- Main, Gloria Lund (1982). Tobacco Colony: Life in Early Maryland, 1650–1720. Princeton University Press. ISBN 978-0-691-04693-8. OCLC 1012073027.
- Main, Gloria L. (2001). Peoples of a Spacious Land: Families and Cultures in Colonial New England. Harvard University Press. ISBN 978-0-674-00628-7. OCLC 1170133235.

=== Articles ===
- Main, Gloria L. (1975). "Probate Records as a Source for Early American History". The William and Mary Quarterly. 32 (1): 89–99. doi:10.2307/1922595. JSTOR 1922595.
- Main, Gloria L. (1994). "Gender, Work, and Wages in Colonial New England". The William and Mary Quarterly. 51 (1): 39–66. doi:10.2307/2947004. JSTOR 2947004.
