= Willett Main =

American politician

Willett S. Main (August 15, 1828 – July 5, 1902) was an American politician.

Born in Edmeston, New York, Main moved with his family to Clarksville, New York, then to Waukesha County, Wisconsin Territory in 1846, and then to Madison, Wisconsin Territory in 1847. He was a farmer and merchant. He served as sheriff and under-sheriff of Dane County, Wisconsin and was a deputy United States Marshal. He served in the Wisconsin State Senate, as a Republican, from 1888 to 1892. He died of heart disease near Madison, Wisconsin. His brother was Alexander H. Main, who served in the New York State Assembly, and he was the brother-in-law of Senator John Coit Spooner.
