= Alain Mamou-Mani =

French film producer and writer (born 1949)

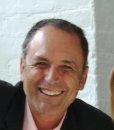
- Portrait of Alain Mamou-Mani
- Born: 26 December 1949 (age 76); Nabeul, Tunisia
- Occupations: Writer, producer

Alain Mamou-Mani (born 26 December 1949, Nabeul, Tunisia) is a French film producer and writer.

== Biography ==
He has written several books (essays, novels) including Life in green on the marriage of ecology and economy" and "Beyond profit" on SRI investments, prefaced by Raoul Vaneigem. Alain Mamou Mani is quoted, meanwhile, in the book of The Ten Commandments by Albert Cohen and Pascal Obispo, with Monsignor Thomas, Dalil Boubakeur and Joseph Sitruk, in 2000.

In 2012, Mamou-Mani was named an Officer of the National Order of Merit (France).

Married to Chantal Pottier, the Éditions Albin Michel publishing press officer, he is the father of the humorist Mamouz, the co-founder of Dynamic Beta Investments, Mathias Mamou-Mani, the architect Arthur Mamou-Mani, and the brother of Guy Mamou-Mani.

== Filmography ==
- 2003 : Kedma directed by Amos Gitai
- 2003 : Rire et Chatiment directed by Isabelle Doval
- 2003 : Alila directed by Amos Gitai
- 2004 : Promised Land directed by Amos Gitai
- 2005 : Espace Détente directed by Yvan Le Bolloc'h and Bruno Solo
- 2005 : Bunker Paradise directed by Stefan Liberski
- 2008 : Un château en Espagne directed by Isabelle Doval

== Bibliography ==
- Au-delà du profit. Comment réconcilier Woodstock et Wall Street, Albin Michel;
- La vie en vert. Le mariage de l'écologie et de l'économie, éd. Payot;
- Les Dix Commandements, éd. Albin Michel;
- Forces majeures (roman), éd. Nil;
- Du rififi dans les starts-up (roman), éd. Publibook;
- La Grippe (roman), éd. Inlibroveritas;
- Le Grand Livre de la tendresse, Albin Michel, 2002;
- Le rebond économique de la France – 85 innovateurs, acteurs de la croissance et de l'emploi témoignent, de Vincent Lorphelin collectif, Pearson, 2012.
- La Grippe (roman), éd. Createspace/amazon, 2013;
- Vénus, la déesse de l'Amour (roman), éd. Createspace/Amazon avec Ornella Bardini, 2013;
- Au ciel! Rien ne va plus! (pièce de théâtre), éd. Createspace/Amazon, 2013;
- Du rififi dans les starts-up (roman), éd. Publibook, 2014;
- Souvenirs d'en face (récit), éd. Createspace/Amazon, 2014 ISBN 978-1496051370
- Kill Jean Comment ils ont tue Jean Seberg (roman), éd. Balzac avec Antoine Lassaigne, 2019
- La fille rêvée de Kim Jung-un (roman), éd. La route de la soie with Antoine Lassaigne, 2023.
- Pour l'amour du faux (roman), éd. La route de la soie avec Antoine Lassaigne, 2024.

== Scenarios ==
- 1980 : Panne des sens (avec Louis Daquin, Caroline Champetier, Alain Mamou-Mani, Jean-Jacques Kupiec) co-réalisé avec Dominique Chapuis
- 1996 : Le jour de la Terre;
- 2018 : The diamond song avec Antoine Lassaigne;
- 2020 : Pour l’amour du faux avec Antoine Lassaigne et Rémy Prechac;
- 2019 : Le premier pas avec Antoine Lassaigne;
- 2020 : Itinéraire d’une groupie avec Antoine Lassaigne;
