= Thomas Mayne (rugby union) =

Irish rugby union player (1893–1961)

- Born: 14 November 1893 Belfast, Ireland
- Died: 23 January 1961 (aged 67) Belfast, Northern Ireland

Rugby union career
- Position: Scrum-half
International career
Years	Team	Apps	(Points)
1921	Ireland	3	(0)

Thomas Mayne (14 November 1893 – 23 January 1961) was an Irish international rugby union player.

One of four rugby playing brothers, Mayne competed for North of Ireland in his native city and was capped three times for Ireland as a scrum-half in the 1921 Five Nations, which included a win over Scotland.

Mayne worked for a shipping communications company and was committee chairman of the North of Ireland club.

== See also ==
- List of Ireland national rugby union players
