= Alexander H. Main =

American politician (1824 – 1896)

Alexander Hamilton Main (June 22, 1824 – January 9, 1896) was an American businessman and politician.

Born in Plainfield, New York, Main owned a store in Allegany County, New York. In 1856, Main served in the New York State Assembly, as a Republican. Main then moved to Madison, Wisconsin, in 1856, where he worked in a bank and then owned an insurance business and was president of Wisconsin Board of Underwriters. Main was also a curator of the Wisconsin Historical Society and served as the society's treasurer. He died in Madison, Wisconsin. His brother was Willett Main, who served in the Wisconsin State Senate.

New York State Assembly
Preceded by Lucius S. May	New York State Assembly; Allegany County, 1st District; 1856	Succeeded by James T. Cameron
