= Cumberland Island National Seashore =

Protected area in Camden County, Georgia, US

- IUCN category II (national park)
- Location within Georgia Location within the United States
- Location: Camden County, Georgia, US
- Nearest city: St. Marys, Georgia
- Coordinates: 30°50′N 81°27′W
- Area: 36,415.39 acres (147.3679 km^{2}); 18,700.34 acres (75.6776 km^{2}) federal
- Established: October 23, 1972
- Visitors: 60,299 (in 2025)
- Governing body: National Park Service
- Website: Cumberland Island National Seashore

Cumberland Island National Seashore preserves most of Cumberland Island in Camden County, Georgia, the largest of Georgia's Golden Isles. The seashore features beaches and dunes, marshes, and freshwater lakes. The national seashore also preserves and interprets many historic sites and structures.

Instrumental in the creation and preservation of the seashore were several conservation organizations including the Sierra Club and the Georgia Conservancy.

The island is only accessible by boat. The Cumberland Island Visitor Center, Cumberland Island Museum, and Lang concession ferry to the island are located in the city of St. Marys, Georgia. Public access via the ferry is limited, reservations are recommended. Camping is allowed in the seashore. The 9,886-acre (40.01 km^{2}) Cumberland Island Wilderness is part of the seashore.

== History ==
The national seashore was authorized by Congress on October 23, 1972, and is administered by the National Park Service. The wilderness area was designated on September 8, 1982. It includes the High Point-Half Moon Bluff Historic District, which was listed on the National Register of Historic Places in 1978.

== Biology and ecology ==
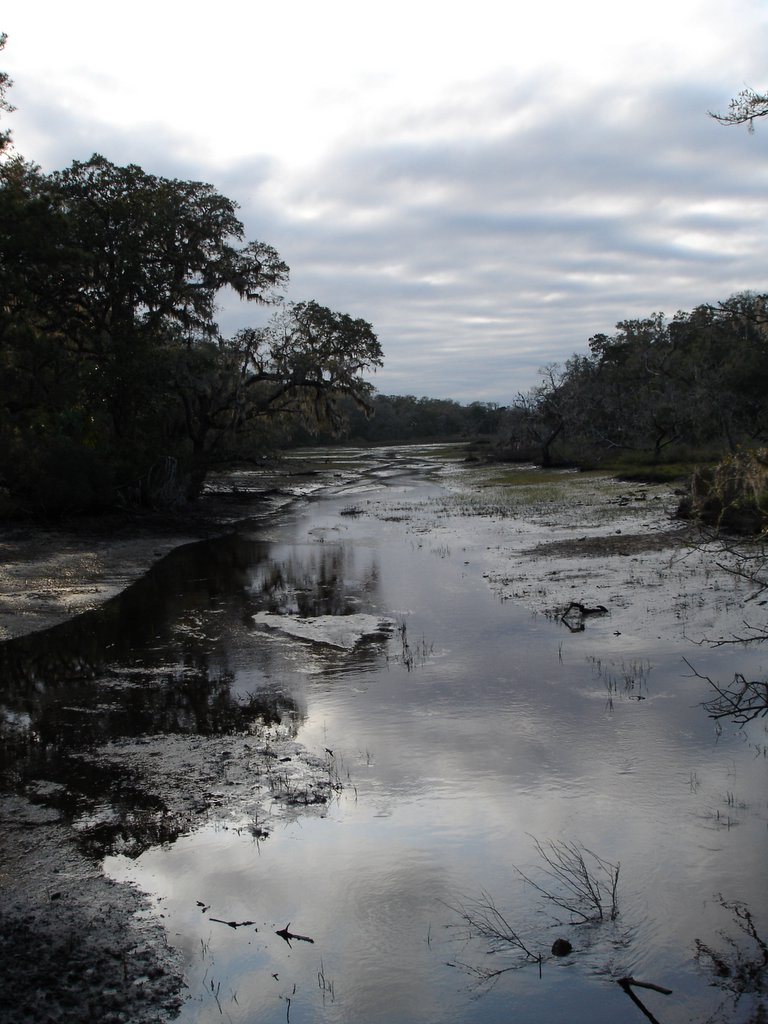
Marsh on Cumberland Island, nearby Plum Orchard

Cumberland Island National Seashore contains a dense diversity of coastal flora and fauna. The National Park Service employs a full-time wildlife manager and scientists, and hosts researchers periodically. The park contains at least 23 distinct ecological communities, making it the largest and most biodiverse of Georgia's barrier islands. Birds, particularly migratory waterfowl, have been studied.

== Recreation ==
The public areas of Cumberland Island are part of a national seashore managed by the National Park Service. NPS restricts access to 300 people on the island at a time, and campers are allowed to stay no more than seven nights. The island is only accessible by boat. The Cumberland Queen ferry runs three times a day from March 1 to September 30. From October 1 to November 31 it only runs twice a day. From December 1 to February 28 the boat runs twice a day only on Mondays - Thursdays to Cumberland Island from the mainland (St. Marys, Georgia). Visitors cannot bring vehicles on the ferry, and there are no paved roads or trails. Bikes are available for rent at the Sea Camp Dock, on a first-come, first-served basis. Visitors may bring their own bikes on the ferry to the island for an additional charge. There is one camping area with running water and bathrooms with cold showers; the other camping sites do not have facilities. All food, ice and supplies must be shipped from the mainland, as there are no stores on the island.

There are three additional hike-in "wilderness" beach campsites available to backpackers, located 5.5, 7.5, and 10.5 miles from the dock. ("Backpack Trail Guide: Cumberland Island Wilderness Campsites (Hickory Hill, Yankee Paradise, Brickhill Bluff)".)

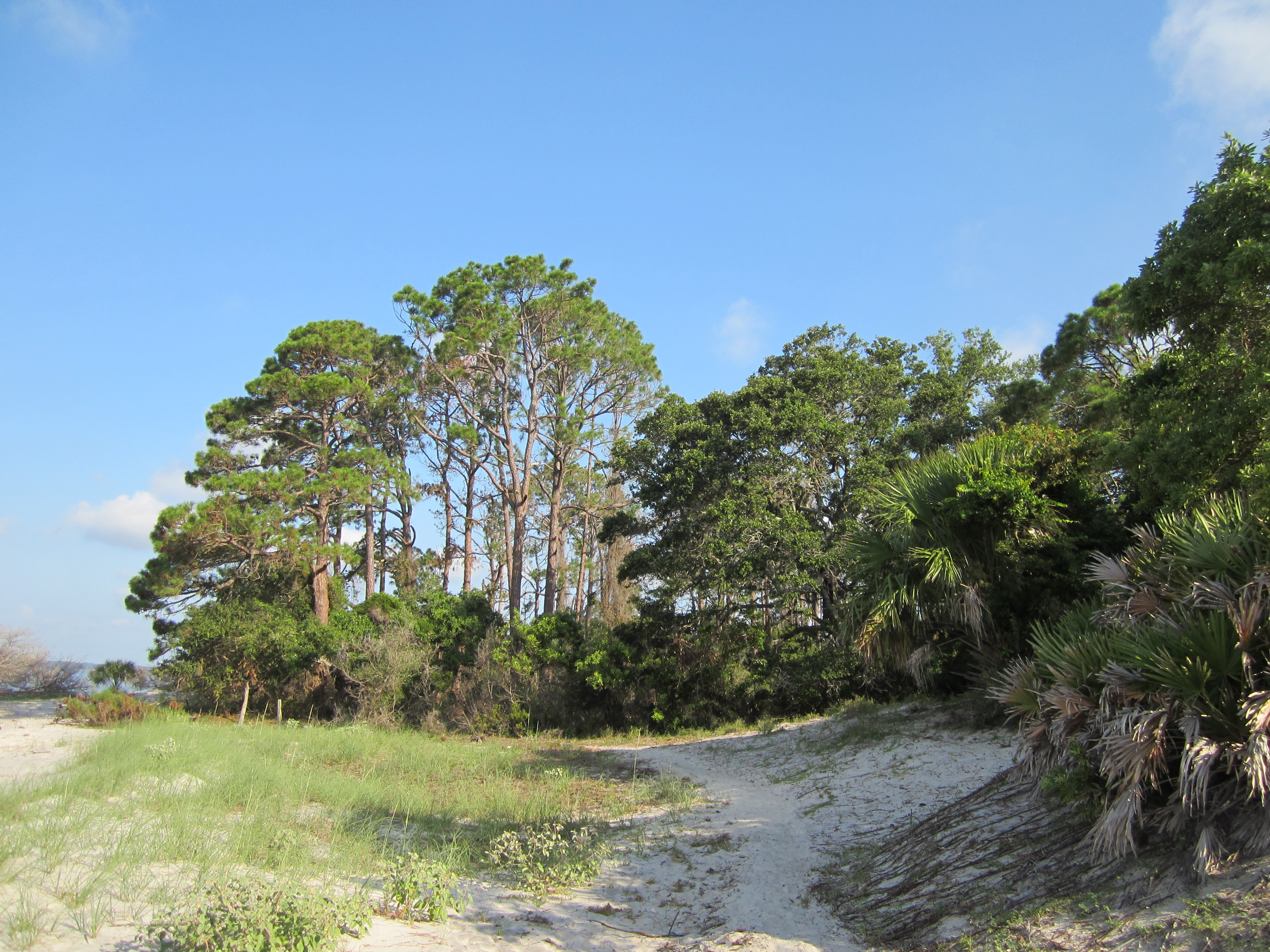
South End Trail passes through a variety of plant communities including live oak maritime forest, beach, and pine-dominated forest.

=== Cumberland Island National Seashore Museum ===
The Cumberland Island National Seashore Museum is located in St. Marys, Georgia on the mainland entrance to the seashore, across from the park's visitor center. The main exhibit focuses on the island's history, including displays on the Timucua Indians, antebellum plantations, and the estates of the Carnegie family. It includes information about the lives of American Revolutionary hero General Nathanael Greene and cotton-gin inventor Eli Whitney, the history of the ruined mansion Dungeness and the Plum Orchard estate. A secondary exhibit holds one of the finest transportation exhibits in coastal Georgia, including wagons, carriages, and elite travel equipment. The new exhibit "Forgotten Invasion" describes the occupation of Cumberland Island and Camden County during the War of 1812. The museum is staffed by volunteers and is open on weekday afternoons.

=== Ice House Museum ===
This building was constructed around 1900 to store ice shipped by barge from New England to Georgia for use by the Carnegies. The ice was cut in large blocks from frozen lakes and ponds, then wrapped tightly in burlap sacks stuffed with straw and sawdust for shipping southward. The ice house was constructed as a large cooler, its walls packed with a thick layer of straw and saw dust insulation. A gabled cupola extends for the length of the roof, providing an outlet for warm air that rises to the top of the building. When a generator for electricity was installed on the island and ice could be made on-site, the ice house became a storage area.

The building has been restored by the National Park Service and converted into a small museum with exhibits that showcase original artifacts and replicas from the island's prehistoric, colonial, early American and Gilded Era periods. Tabby concrete foundations dating to the early 1800s were discovered during the renovation of the structure. These foundations are believed to be those of a general store that may have been active during the Greene-Miller era of the island's history.

=== Plum Orchard and Dungeness ===
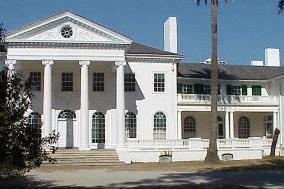
Plum Orchard

The Dungeness and Plum Orchard were designated as National Historic Districts in 1982 and 1984 respectively. The Dungeness district contains the ruins of the Carnegie Dungeness mansion and its supporting structures and gardens, the Tabby House dating to the Early Republic, and a cemetery. The Plum Orchard Historic District contains the intact Plum Orchard mansion dating to the 1890s, a shell midden dating back over 4,000 years, and the mansion's support structures including an electrical house.

== Climate ==
Cumberland Island National Seashore

Climate chart (precipitation, max. and min. temperature)
J	F	M	A	M	J	J	A	S	O	N	D
67 12 8	104 12 8	118 19 13	112 24 17	160 25 20	269 27 24	179 27 24	199 25 24	162 23 21	76 23 18	90 20 16	99 18 13
- █ Average max. and min. temperatures in °C
- █ Precipitation totals in mm
Imperial conversion
J	F	M	A	M	J	J	A	S	O	N	D
2.6 54 46	4.1 54 46	4.6 66 55	4.4 75 63	6.3 77 68	11 81 75	7 81 75	7.8 77 75	6.4 73 70	3 73 64	3.5 68 61	3.9 64 55
- █ Average max. and min. temperatures in °F
- █ Precipitation totals in inches

== See also ==
- Grover Island
- Carol Ruckdeschel
- Georgia's Colonial Coast Birding Trail
