= Demain (surname) =

Demain or DeMain or De Main is a surname, and may refer to:

- Adrian Demain (born 1966), American musician
- Arnold Demain (1927–2020), American microbiologist
- Gordon De Main (1886–1954), American film actor
- John DeMain (active 1983), American musician
