= Maine (surname) =

Maine is a surname. Notable people with the surname include:

- Charles Eric Maine (1921–1981), pen name of David McIlwain, English writer
- Henry James Sumner Maine (1822–1888), British legal historian
- John Maine (born 1981), American baseball player
- Mack Maine (born 1985), American rapper and singer
- Scott Maine (born 1985), American baseball player

Fictional characters:

- Jackson Maine, a fictional character in the 2018 film A Star Is Born (2018 film)
- Norman Maine, a fictional character in the 1937 film A Star Is Born and the 1954 remake
- Olivia Maine, a fictional character in the American television series This Is Us

== See also ==
- Maines (surname)
