= Manassas (disambiguation) =

Manassas may refer to:

== Places ==
- Manassas, Virginia, a city in the United States; known in the 19th century as "Manassas Junction"
  - Manassas Airport, southwest of Manassas, Virginia
  - Manassas (Amtrak station), a railroad station
  - Manassas Park, Virginia, a city adjacent to Manassas, Virginia
- Manassas National Battlefield Park, the location of two major American Civil War battles:
  - First Battle of Bull Run (First Battle of Manassas), July 21, 1861
  - Second Battle of Bull Run (Battle of Second Manassas), August 28–30, 1862
- Manassas Gap, a pass in the northern Blue Ridge Mountains of Virginia; the first entity to bear the name "Manassas"
- Manassas, Georgia, United States, a small town

== Other ==
- Manassas (band), a 1970s rock band
  - Manassas (album), the debut album by Manassas
- CSS Manassas, a Confederate ironclad ram during the American Civil War
- Manassas (novel), a novel by Upton Sinclair
- Manassas (wargame), a 1973 board wargame

== See also ==
- Manasseh
- Manasses (disambiguation)
- Battle of Manassas (disambiguation)
