= Manasses (disambiguation) =

Manasses is a masculine given name of ancient Hebrew origin.

Manasses, Manasseh, or Menashe may also refer to:

== People ==
- Tribe of Manasseh, one of the Tribes of Israel
- Manasseh (tribal patriarch), first son of Joseph
- Manasseh of Judah, king of Judah
- Manasses of Hierges, twelfth-century crusader and constable of the Kingdom of Jerusalem
- Menashe (surname), including a list of people with the name

== Places ==
- Manassas, Virginia, USA
- Plain of Manasseh, a geographical region in northern Israel

== Music ==
- Manassas (band), a 1970s musical group featuring Stephen Stills
- Manassas (album), a 1972, debut LP album, featuring Stephen Stills and the band of the same name

== Other ==
- Prayer of Manasseh, penitential prayer of king Manasseh of Judah

== See also ==
- Manassas (disambiguation)
