= Maynes =

Maynes may refer to:

- Ben Jacques-Maynes (born 1978), American road bicycle racing cyclist from Watsonville, California
- Charles W. Maynes (1938–2007), American diplomat and journal editor
- Dan Maynes-Aminzade (aka Monzy) is a Nerdcore hip-hop artist and software engineer at Google
- Leo Maynes (1911–1998), Australian rules footballer
- Seaghan Maynes (1914–1998), Reuters correspondent, covered the Invasion of Normandy, the Reconstruction of Germany, and the 1948 Arab Israeli War
- William Maynes (1902–1966), Canadian sprinter

== See also ==
- Mayne (disambiguation)
