= National Register of Historic Places listings in Camden County, Georgia =

This is a list of properties and districts in Camden County, Georgia that are listed on the National Register of Historic Places (NRHP).

This National Park Service list is complete through NPS recent listings posted May 23, 2025.

== Current listings ==
	Name on the Register	Image	Date listed	Location	City or town	Description
1	Camden County Courthouse	Camden County Courthouse	September 18, 1980 (#80000983)	4th and Camden Aves. 30°58′06″N 81°43′14″W	Woodbine	
2	Crooked River Site (9CAM118)	Crooked River Site (9CAM118)	December 23, 1985 (#85003179)	Address Restricted.	St. Marys	Is in the extreme northeastern part of Crooked River State Park
3	Duck House		February 13, 1984 (#84000938)	Cumberland Island; 30°50′50″N 81°25′51″W	St. Marys	
4	Dungeness Historic District	Dungeness Historic District	February 13, 1984 (#84000920)	Address Restricted (on Cumberland Island)	St. Marys	
5	Greyfield	Greyfield	July 24, 2003 (#03000675)	Cumberland Island; 30°46′47″N 81°28′07″W		
6	High Point-Half Moon Bluff Historic District		December 22, 1978 (#78000265)	NE of St. Marys on Cumberland Island; 30°55′14″N 81°25′56″W	St. Marys	
7	Kingsland Commercial Historic District	Kingsland Commercial Historic District	March 17, 1994 (#94000186)	Area surrounding S. Lee St. (US 17), between King and William Sts. 30°47′58″N 81°41′25″W	Kingsland	
8	Little Cumberland Island Lighthouse	Little Cumberland Island Lighthouse	August 28, 1989 (#89001407)	N end of Little Cumberland Island; 30°58′34″N 81°24′47″W	St. Marys	
9	Main Road	Main Road	February 13, 1984 (#84000941)	Cumberland Island; 30°49′45″N 81°27′26″W	St. Marys	
10	John Houstoun McIntosh Sugarhouse	John Houstoun McIntosh Sugarhouse	April 2, 1992 (#92000167)	Ga. Spur 40, 6 mi. N of St. Marys, access is from Charlie Smith Hwy. (at 30.79310°N 81.57712°W); 30°47′36″N 81°34′43″W	St. Marys	
11	Orange Hall	Orange Hall	May 7, 1973 (#73000613)	311 Osborne St. 30°43′28″N 81°32′53″W	St. Marys	
12	Plum Orchard Historic District	Plum Orchard Historic District	November 23, 1984 (#84000258)	Address Restricted (on Cumberland Island)	St. Marys	
13	Rayfield Archeological District		February 13, 1984 (#84000924)	Address Restricted	St. Marys	On Cumberland Island
14	St. Marys Historic District	St. Marys Historic District	May 13, 1976 (#76000609)	Roughly bounded by Waterfront Rd., Norris, Alexander, and Oak Grove Cemetery; 30°43′24″N 81°32′53″W	St. Marys	
15	Stafford Plantation	Stafford Plantation	November 23, 1984 (#84000265)	Address Restricted (on Cumberland Island)	St. Marys	The only surviving antebellum-era structures are "the chimneys," slave cabin ruins.
16	Table Point Archeological District		November 23, 1984 (#84000260)	Address Restricted	St. Marys	On Cumberland Island
17	Woodbine Historic District	Woodbine Historic District	May 12, 1999 (#99000553)	Jct. of Bedell Ave. (US 17) and 3rd and 4th Sts. and the central business district 30°58′04″N 81°43′27″W	Woodbine	
