= Carnegie family =

Wealthy American family

- Connected families: Rockefeller family

The Carnegie family was a wealthy American family. Andrew Carnegie, a member of the family, is considered to be one of the richest Americans ever. Andrew Carnegie donated most of his wealth upon his death. Thomas Carnegie bought much of Cumberland Island, some of which was donated to the National Park Foundation to become a national seashore. Some of Thomas Carnegie's descendents currently run the Greyfield Inn on Cumberland Island.

== History ==
On May 17, 1848, the Carnegie family moved from Glasgow to Pittsburgh. William Carnegie was a hand-loom weaver that moved the Carnegie family to Allegheny City after he lost his job.

Thomas Carnegie bought a large part of Cumberland Island. The Carnegies built the Dungeness and Plum Orchard—a Georgian Revival mansion—on Cumberland Island. The Dungeness was destroyed in a fire in the 1950s. The Carnegie family donated much of their land on the island to the National Park Foundation in 1971. After the island was turned into a national seashore, only the Carnegie and Candler families were allowed to stay.

In 1889, Carnegie published The Gospel of Wealth, which outlined why Andrew Carnegie would donate most of his wealth. After he died, Andrew Carnegie left his wife her assets, some cash, and two homes. He left his daughter a small trust. The rest of Andrew Carnegie's wealth was used to endow 200 libraries, Carnegie Mellon University, and the Carnegie Corporation. Thomas Carnegie distributed his assets between his wife and 9 children, with each child receiving a 10$ million trust. Andrew Carnegie's donations funded around 1,600 libraries, 67 of which were in New York City. A study found that 57 of the libraries founded by Andrew Carnegie in New York City currently remain, 54 of which remain libraries.

== Family ==
Several members of the Carnegie family have had issues with mental health. Thomas Carnegie's wife was admitted to McLean Hospital due to mental health issues.

=== Family tree ===
William Carnegie (1804-1855)	Margaret Morrison (1810-1886)
Emily Harrison Thorp (1876-1952)	Henry Davis Whitfield (1874-1949)	Louise Whitfield Carnegie (1857-1946)	Andrew Carnegie (1835-1919)	Thomas Morrison Carnegie (1843-1886)	Lucy Coleman (1847-1916)
Elizabeth Halsey (1911–1992)	Andrew Carnegie Whitfield (1910-)	Roswell Miller Jr. (1894–1983)	Margaret Carnegie Miller (1897-1990)	William Coleman Carnegie (1867-1944)	Martha Gertrude Ely (1871-1906)	Frank Morrison Carnegie (1868-1917)	Andrew Carnegie II (1870-1947)	Bertha Sherlock (1863–1943)	Oliver Garrison Ricketson (1864–1943)	Margaret Coleman Carnegie (1872-1927)	Thomas Morrison Carnegie Jr. (1874-1944)	Virginia Beggs (1878–1952)	George Lauder Carnegie (1876-1921)	Margaret Copley Thaw (1877–1942)	Florence Nightingale Carnegie (1879-1962)	Frederick Curtis Perkins (1870-1935)	Coleman Carnegie (1880-1911)	Nancy Trovillo Carnegie (1881-1954)
Louise Carnegie Miller Thomson (1920-1947)	Roswell “Robin” Miller III (1922-1975)	Barbara Miller Lawson (1925-2002)	Margaret Miller Flockhart (1926-1982)	Nancy Carnegie Rockefeller (1900-1994)	Oliver Garrison Ricketson (1894-1952)	Lucy Carnegie Ferguson (1899-1989)	Thomas Morrison Carnegie III (1900-1954)	Carter Curtis Beggs Carnegie (1907-1957)	Frederick Curtis Perkins Jr. (1902-1937)

=== Modern ===
The descendents of Lucy Carnegie Ferguson currently own the Greyfield Inn. The current owners of the Greyfield Inn are the 5th generation of Carnegies. Two of the Carnegie have run the Greyfield Inn for 40 years.

== Estates ==
- Andrew Carnegie Mansion
- Dungeness
- Greyfield Inn
- Migdale Castle
- Plum Orchard
- Skibo Castle
- Stafford Plantation

== Organizations ==
=== Businesses ===
- Carnegie Brothers and Company
- Carnegie Steel Company
- Edgar Thomson Steel Works
- Keystone Bridge Company

=== Philanthropic ===
- Carnegie Corporation of New York
- Carnegie Council for Ethics in International Affairs
- Carnegie Endowment for International Peace
- Carnegie Foundation for the Advancement of Teaching
- Carnegie Hall
- Carnegie Institution for Science
- Carnegie Library of Pittsburgh
- Carnegie Trust for the Universities of Scotland
- Carnegie United Kingdom Trust
- Carnegie Hero Fund
- Carnegie Mellon University
- Carnegie Museums of Pittsburgh
- Dunfermline Carnegie Library
