= Lucy Carnegie Ferguson =

American conservationist (1899–1989)

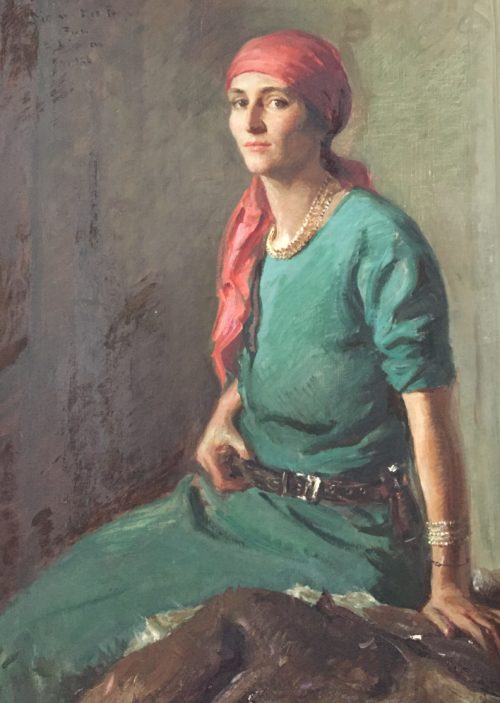
- Portrait of a young Lucy Carnegie Ricketson Ferguson, Ernest Ludvig Ipsen
- Born: September 14, 1899
- Died: September 11, 1989 (aged 89)
- Spouse: Robert Weeks Ferguson
- Parent(s): Oliver Garrison Ricketson; Margaret Coleman Carnegie

Lucy Carnegie Ricketson Ferguson (14 September 1899 – 11 September 1989) was a member of the American industrialist Carnegie family who spent much of her life working to conserve Cumberland Island, the largest part of which was declared a national seashore in 1972. A granddaughter of Thomas Carnegie, her family once owned 90 percent of the island.

== Early years ==
Lucy Carnegie Ricketson was a granddaughter of Thomas M. Carnegie, brother and business partner of the steel magnate and philanthropist Andrew Carnegie. She was born in New York City to Oliver Garrison Ricketson and Margaret Coleman Ricketson (née Carnegie), and moved with her parents when she was three years old to Cumberland Island, located off the southern coast of Georgia, directly north of the Georgia–Florida state line.

She married Robert Weeks Ferguson on 29 June 1920, in New Bedford, Massachusetts. Ferguson (1897–1968), had been an ensign in the U. S. Navy during World War I. A member of the Democratic Party, he served three terms in the Georgia Legislature as a state representative for Camden County from 1939 until 1943. Lucy Ferguson was active in Camden County and affairs of the state of Georgia throughout most of her life as well.

== Mistress of Greyfield ==
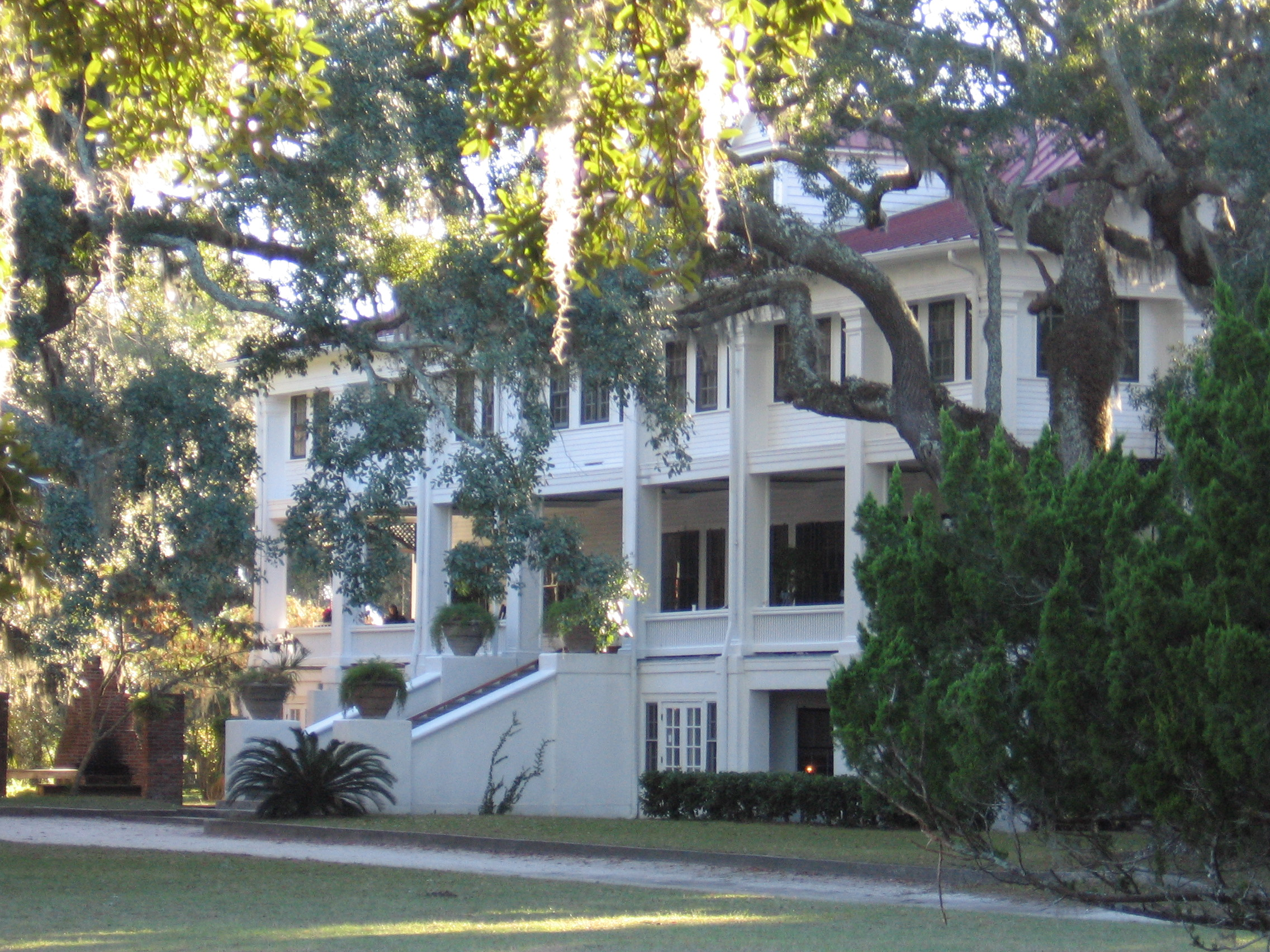
Greyfield Inn

In 1881, Thomas Carnegie purchased 4,000 acres on Cumberland Island, and in 1882 bought more land from the nephews of Robert Stafford, who had operated a cotton plantation on the island from 1834 to his death in 1877. The tract included the land on which the Greyfield property was later established. Carnegie built Dungeness, a 40-room mansion, on the southernmost end of the island; construction began in 1884 and was completed in 1885. He died of pneumonia the next year, at age 44. His widow, Lucy Coleman Carnegie, was the sole beneficiary of his estate and became the owner of the Cumberland Island properties.

Following her husband's death, she bought an additional 12,000 acres on Cumberland, and subsequently bought more land on the island with dividends she received when Andrew Carnegie sold the Carnegie Steel Company to J. P. Morgan and partners in 1901. She built Greyfield, a semi-formal Colonial Revival style building, for her daughter Margaret (1872–1927) and husband Oliver G. Ricketson; construction started in 1901 and lasted through 1905. The Greyfield tract and the house bear the name of an earlier landowner, John W. Gray, who purchased that part of the island in 1825.

Upon her death in 1916, Lucy Carnegie owned 16,000 acres on the island; there were other landowners on its north end, but her property was the largest. She had designed a will in 1912 that set up a complex trust arrangement to prevent her heirs from dividing or selling the island lands until the death of her last surviving child, unless they agreed to do so unanimously. The death of her daughter Florence Carnegie Perkins in 1962 ended the trust, and the island was divided among the heirs. That same year, Lucy Ferguson converted Greyfield into an inn; as of 2021, it is still run by her descendants as a bed and breakfast inn. Ferguson made her home at Greyfield for more than 70 years before she moved into a smaller house.

== Career ==
Lucy and Robert W. Ferguson had two sons, Robert W. Jr. and Oliver R., two daughters, Margaret McDowell and Lucy McLaughlan, as well as 17 grandchildren and 19 great-grandchildren.

Ferguson raised cattle, horses, hogs, and poultry on Cumberland Island for over 40 years as an income-producing operation she called "Serendipity Farm". Her farming activities were centered on an 1,000-acre tract in the middle of the island, where she worked into her eighth decade, driving around the property in an open jeep and milking cows herself.

In 1968, Ferguson transferred all of her holdings on Cumberland Island to Greyfield Land Corporation, now dissolved. This included both her houses and adjoining buildings as well as the land on which they stand. The transfer was made to establish an estate planning vehicle and to transfer partial ownership of the land to her children, so that the land could be held as one tract and not be split up. This allowed the Ferguson family to manage the holdings with one corporate owner of all their Cumberland Island properties rather than a dispersed ownership.

== Death ==
Lucy Carnegie Ferguson died after a long illness at age 89 on 11 September 1989.
