= Bill Jones (steelmaking) =

William Richard Jones (1839 – September 29, 1889) was an American steelmaking inventor and manager highly valued by his last employer, Andrew Carnegie.

== Early life ==
Jones was born in Luzerne, Pennsylvania, in 1839. His family had come from a mining area in Wales and immigrated to America for a better life nine years before his birth. Bill Jones was one of eleven children. His mother died when he was only eight. He attended public school in Catasauqua, Pennsylvania, but was expelled for sticking up for a classmate, causing controversy with a teacher. Due to the ill health of his father, Reverend John Jones, he began working at the age of ten in 1849, beginning an apprenticeship at the Lehigh Crane Iron Works, under David Thomas who was a friend of his father's in Wales. During this time, he was learning the skills which would help him become a leading figure in the industry years later. When Bill was fourteen, his father succumbed to his illness. Jones was then in the care of his stepmother, who was left with ten children.

Soon after his father's death, Bill Jones left home, heading for work in Philadelphia. He worked in various places around the country.

On April 14, 1861, he married Harriet Lloyd in Chattanooga, Tennessee. They had four children.

== American Civil War service ==
With the outbreak of the American Civil War in April 1861, he and his wife moved back north. On July 31, 1862, he enlisted as a private in the 133rd Pennsylvania Infantry Regiment for nine months service and was promoted to corporal. He later organized a company of the 194th Infantry Regiment and was made the company's captain on July 20, 1864.

== Steel industry ==
After leaving the military, Jones went to work for the Cambria Iron Company, where he had worked prior to the war in two separate stints.

He is historically known within the steel industry for building the Edgar Thomson Steel Works. He was the supervisor for this mill up until his death. In its first five years, the Edgar Thomson Steel Works rose to become the world's most productive and profitable steel mill. Jones was employed by Andrew Carnegie as superintendent, but under Jones' conditions: he was to be in control of the mill's labor management and the men working there were to be well paid, and well rested to lessen the rate of accidents. Carnegie valued Jones so highly that he offered Jones a partnership, but Jones turned him down. Instead Jones asked a large salary; Carnegie paid him as much as the president of the United States earned: $25,000 per year.

It was during this time that he became known for establishing the eight-hour day policy: “Flesh and blood cannot stand twelve hours of continuous work.” Carnegie and Jones had a lot in common, especially when it came to discussing the Civil War. Jones was an “American Hero” for his actions in the Johnstown flood. In 1888, Carnegie restored the twelve-hour workday. It would not be seen again in the American steel industry for another fifty years.

Jones began patenting his more than 50 inventions, beginning on June 12, 1876, with "Washers for Ingot Molds." His last and perhaps most important, the Jones Mixer, began operating in September 1888.

== Death ==
On September 27, 1889, Bill Jones entered Edgar Thomson Steel Works finding multiple workers around furnace C. He learned it was experiencing continual issues with its cooling system in the day. In the afternoon, the heat had chilled inside the chimney and forty tons of molten iron blocked the chimney furnace. Jones helped his workers try to pass the blockage. When pouring cakes of iron ore on the blockage in hopes of getting it to pass normally failed, Jones climbed the scaffolding of the furnace, assisting to work a rod through the cooling system. It was at this moment a sudden roar came from within the hole Jones was working. Forty tons of molten iron flooded the platform. In Jones’ effort to escape, he fell 40 feet (12 m) into a cinder car, striking his head against the car. He also suffered a bad burn on his right arm from his hand to his elbow, singed eyebrows, and burns all the way up to his abdomen. Jones was conscious afterward, checking with his brother John Lewis Jones about the other workers. His brother carried him to medical help. He was taken to Homeopathy Hospital, where doctors were confident he would fully recover, but two days after the accident, he died in the night at the hospital at the age of 50.
