= Carol Ruckdeschel =

Biologist

- Born: December 3, 1941 (age 84); Rochester, New York
- Occupations: Biologist, naturalist, and environmental activist
- Years active: 1971–present

Carol Ruckdeschel is a biologist, naturalist, environmental activist and author. As a Cumberland Island resident, she was involved in the creation and preservation of Cumberland Island National Seashore. She is the subject of the book Untamed: The Wildest Woman in America and the Fight for Cumberland Island by Will Harlan.

She has researched sea turtles and endangered and extinct species around the Georgia coast.

Her residence on the north part of Cumberland Island is currently owned by The National Park Service, on the condition of her remaining there until her death.

== Books ==
- Ruckdeschel, Carol (2017). A Natural History of Cumberland Island. Mercer University Press. ISBN 9780881466096.
- Ruckdeschel, Carol; Shoop, C. R.; Zug, George R. (2000). Sea Turtles of the Georgia Coast. Cumberland Island Museum. ISBN 9780967938806.

== Journal articles ==
- Robert Shoop, C., and Carol Ruckdeschel. "Increasing turtle strandings in the southeast United States: a complicating factor." Biological Conservation 23.3 (1982): 213–215.
- Frazier, J. G., Judith E. Winston, and Carol A. Ruckdeschel. "Epizoan communities on marine turtles. III. Bryozoa." Bulletin of marine science 51.1 (1992): 1–8.
