= Carnegie Brothers and Company =

Carnegie Brothers & Company, Ltd.
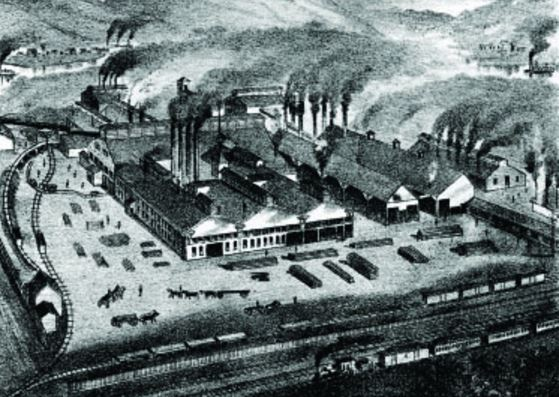
- Company type: Partnership
- Industry: steel, coke, Railroads
- Founded: 1 April 1881; 145 years ago
- Founder: Andrew Carnegie
- Defunct: 1 July 1892; 133 years ago
- Successor: Carnegie Steel
- Headquarters: Pittsburgh, Pennsylvania, U.S.
- Key people: Thomas and Andrew Carnegie, Henry Clay Frick
- Products: steel, coal, coke, railroad flat-rolled steel, tubular steel
- Services: manufacturing

Carnegie Brothers and Company, Ltd. was created by the consolidation of the steel businesses owned by Andrew Carnegie in the early 1880s. Those steel and coke works that were consolidated were:

- Sciota Ore Mines
- Union Iron Mills
- Edgar Thomson Steel Works
- Larimer Coke Works
- Lucy Furnaces
- Monastery Coke Works

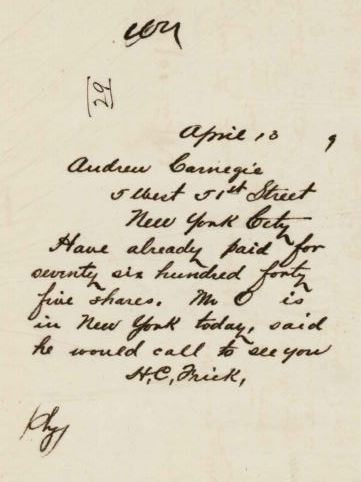
Correspondence from Henry Clay Frick to Andrew Carnegie concerning purchasing shares

The merging of these separate business operations into one resulted in the newly formed company owning an interest of nearly $5 million. At the time, Andrew Carnegie owned over half of it. Henry Clay Frick began to supply Carnegie Brothers and Company with coal and coke that was required to operate the steel mills. This relationship progressed with the result in Frick being the major supplier of coke to the new company.

Thomas Carnegie, Andrew Carnegie's brother died in 1886 and in 1889 Frick began to manage a portion of the company. Frick also bought company shares. Frick advanced and was promoted to chairman of the company. After his promotions Frick worked with Carnegie to reorganize much of business. Frick organized many improvements including a buy out of the Duquesne Steel works. Frick acted to combine "Carnegie Brothers & Company, Limited" and "Carnegie, Phipps & Company" into a single company newly named Carnegie Steel Company, Limited on July 1, 1892.

Carnegie Brothers and Company had contracts with railway and transportation in addition to Keystone Bridge Company, Pittsburgh and Western Railroad, Rail Makes' Association, and the Steel Patent Company. These companies specialized in litigation for steel patents and production methods, including Steel Patent Company of Philadelphia, and rail production the Rail Makers' Association. At the time, many other companies, including Carnegie's were working to establish uniformity of the railroads. These efforts were encouraged by the investments of Carnegies company and on September 7, 1877, the merger was completed with the name the Pittsburgh, New Castle & Lake Erie Railroad. Carnegie Brother & Company, Limited was an investor and supplier to the Pittsburgh and Western Railway.

The University of Pittsburgh houses the financial records of the company in its archives service center, University of Pittsburgh Library System.
