= Stafford Plantation =

Historic plantation in Georgia, United States

- Stafford Plantation Historic District
- U.S. National Register of Historic Places
- U.S. Historic district
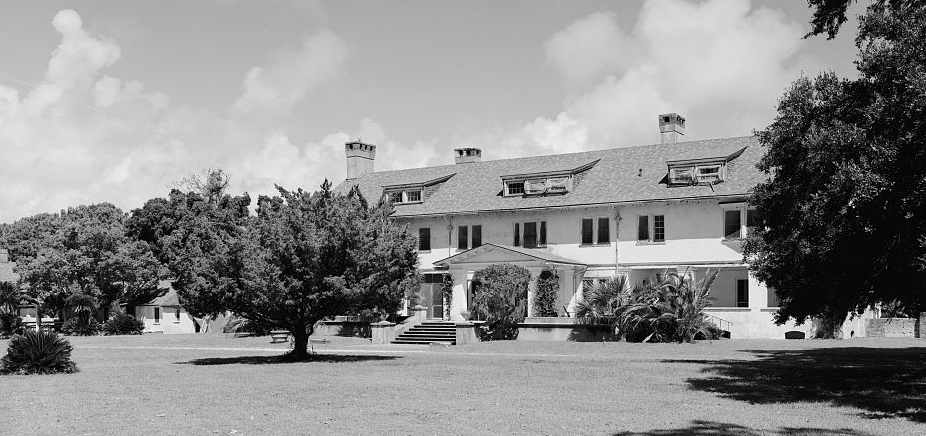
- Stafford mansion
- Nearest city: St. Marys, Georgia
- Built: 1901
- MPS: Cumberland Island National Seashore MRA
- NRHP reference No.: 84000265
- Added to NRHP: November 23, 1984

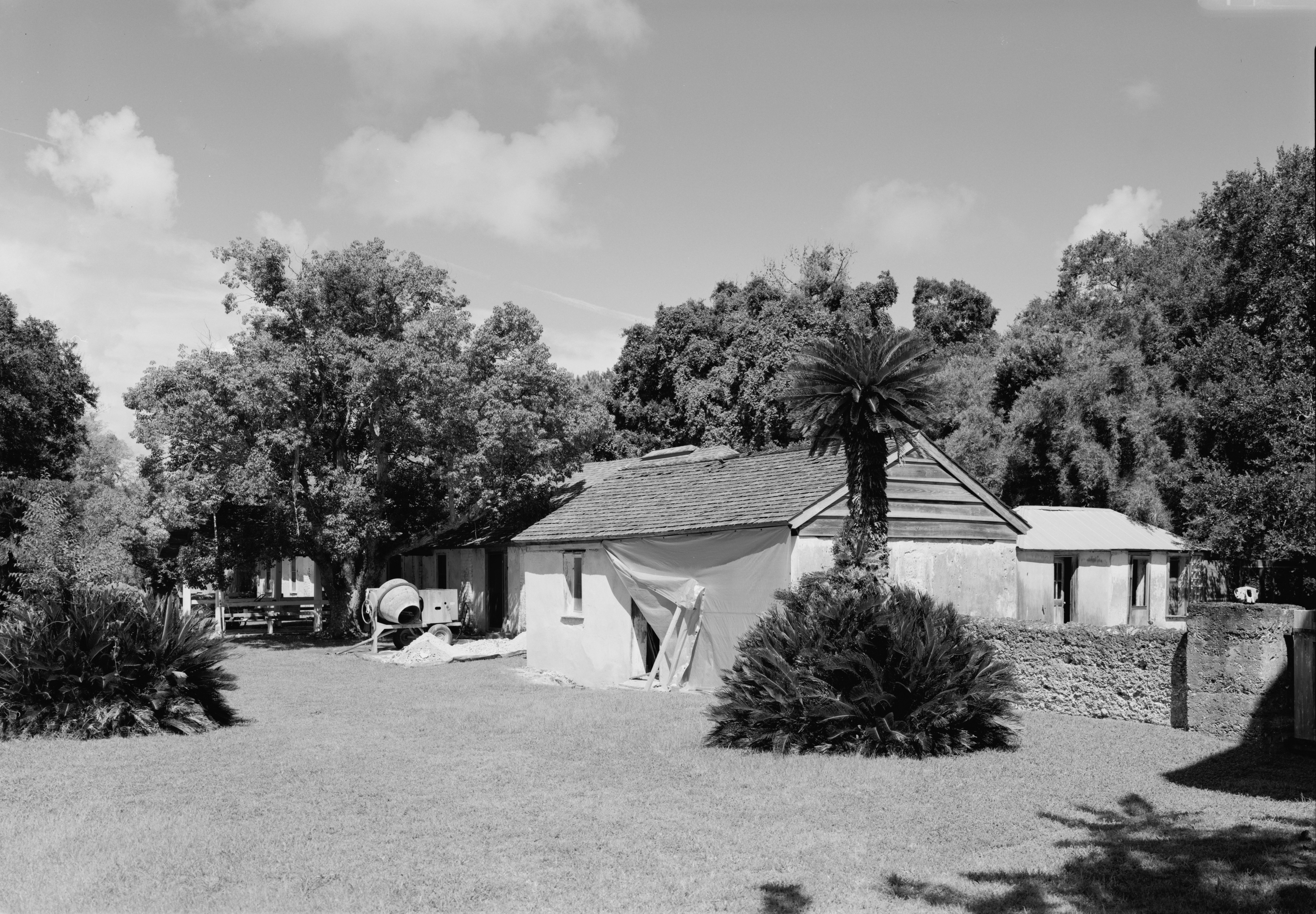
Stafford Plantation setting.

The Stafford Plantation was a plantation on Cumberland Island in Camden County, on the southeastern coast of Georgia. It was established in the early 19th century by Robert Stafford.

== 19th century ==
Stafford acquired portions of lands belonging to General Nathanael Greene through auction, and continued to assemble former Greene family lands so that by 1830 Stafford controlled 1,360 acres (550 ha) with 148 slaves. In 1843 Stafford acquired 4,200 acres (1,700 ha) from P.M. Nightingale, a Greene descendant who retained Dungeness. The primary crop was Sea Island cotton.

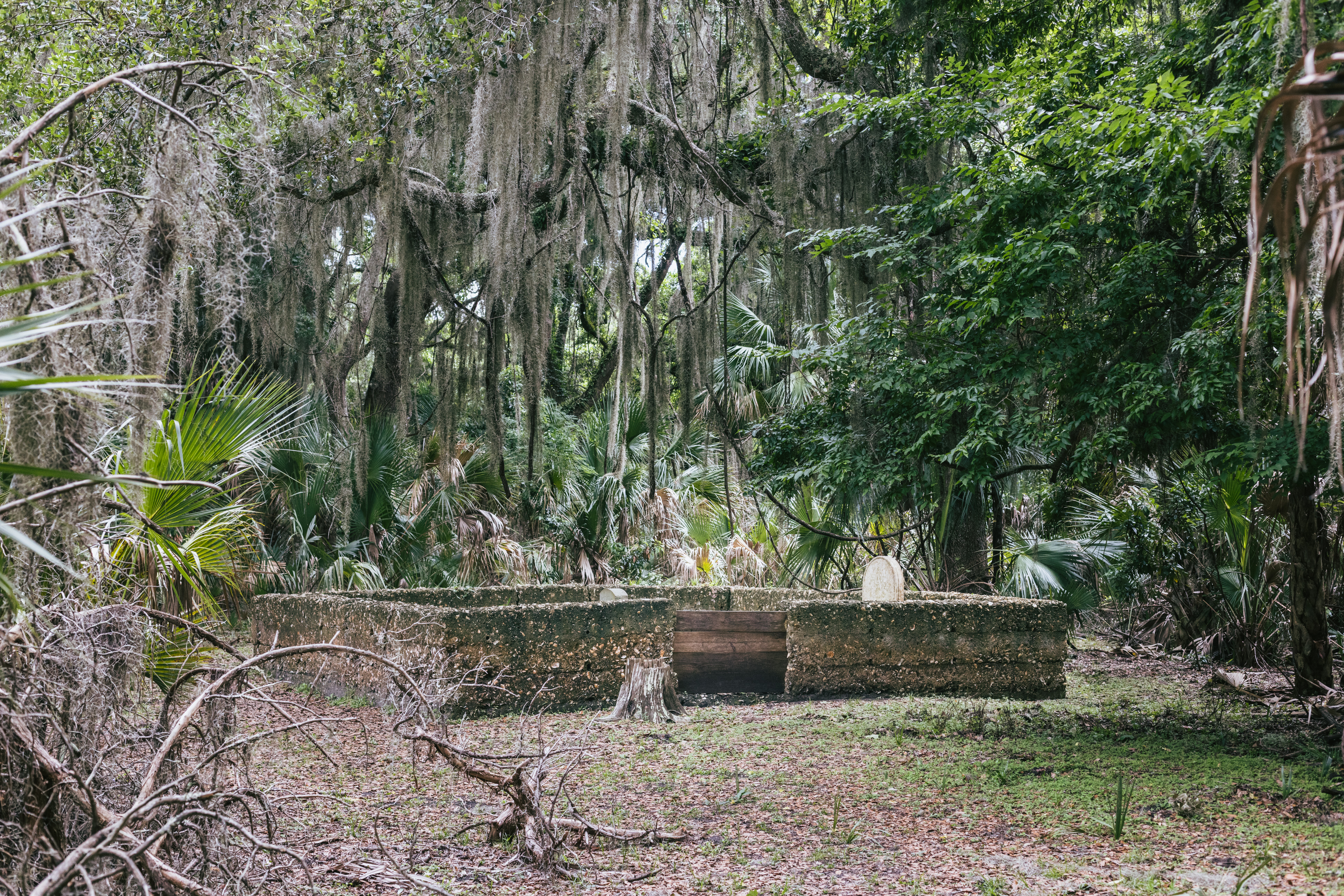
Stafford Cemetery

Robert Stafford died in 1877. His heirs sold the property to Thomas M. Carnegie and his wife Lucy, who had also acquired Dungeness. All that remains of Stafford's house is a ruin known as "the Chimneys," a series of 24 hearth-and-chimney structures representing Stafford's slaves' housing, about one kilometer east of the main house.

== 20th century ==
The Stafford Mansion was built by Lucy Carnegie in 1901, for one of her children. It was one of a series of Carnegie houses on the island, including Plum Orchard, Greyfield, and the main Carnegie residence at Dungeness.

Present day

The property is privately held under a life estate by a Carnegie descendant within Cumberland Island National Seashore.

== See also ==
- National Register of Historic Places listings in Camden County, Georgia
