= Edgar Thomson Steel Works =

Steel mill, Pittsburgh, Pennsylvania, US

Coordinates: 40.392°N 79.854°W

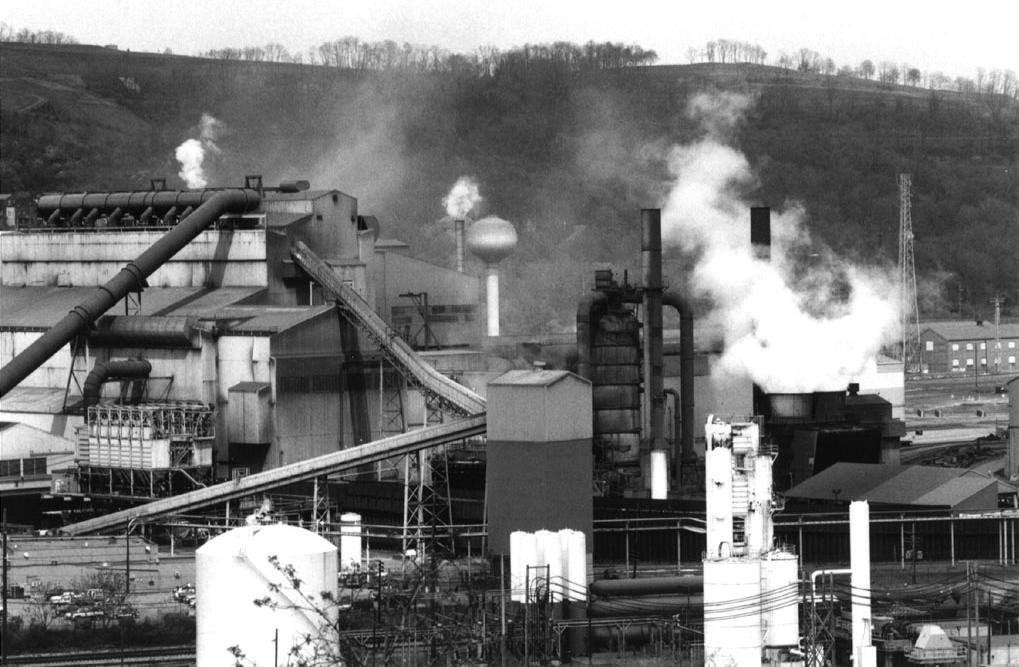
Edgar Thomson Steel Works in the mid-1990s

The Edgar Thomson Steel Works is a steel mill in the Pittsburgh area communities of Braddock and North Braddock, Pennsylvania. It has been active since 1875. It is currently owned by U.S. Steel and is known as Mon Valley Works – Edgar Thomson Plant.

== History ==
=== 18th century ===
The mill occupies the historic site of Braddock's Field, on the banks of the Monongahela River east of Pittsburgh. On July 9, 1755, in the Battle of the Monongahela, French and Indian forces from Fort Duquesne defeated the expedition of British General Edward Braddock, who himself was mortally wounded.

Braddock's Field was also the site of a rally of rebellious militiamen and farmers during the Whiskey Rebellion, prior to a massive march on the town of Pittsburgh on August 1, 1794.

The site is on the banks of the Monongahela, which provides cost-effective, riverine transportation of coke, iron, and finished steel products.

The Edgar Thomson Steel Works was designed and built because of the Bessemer process, the first inexpensive industrial process for the mass production of steel. In the process, air blowing through the molten iron removed impurities via oxidation. This took place in the Bessemer converter, a large ovoid steel container lined with clay or dolomite.

=== 19th century ===
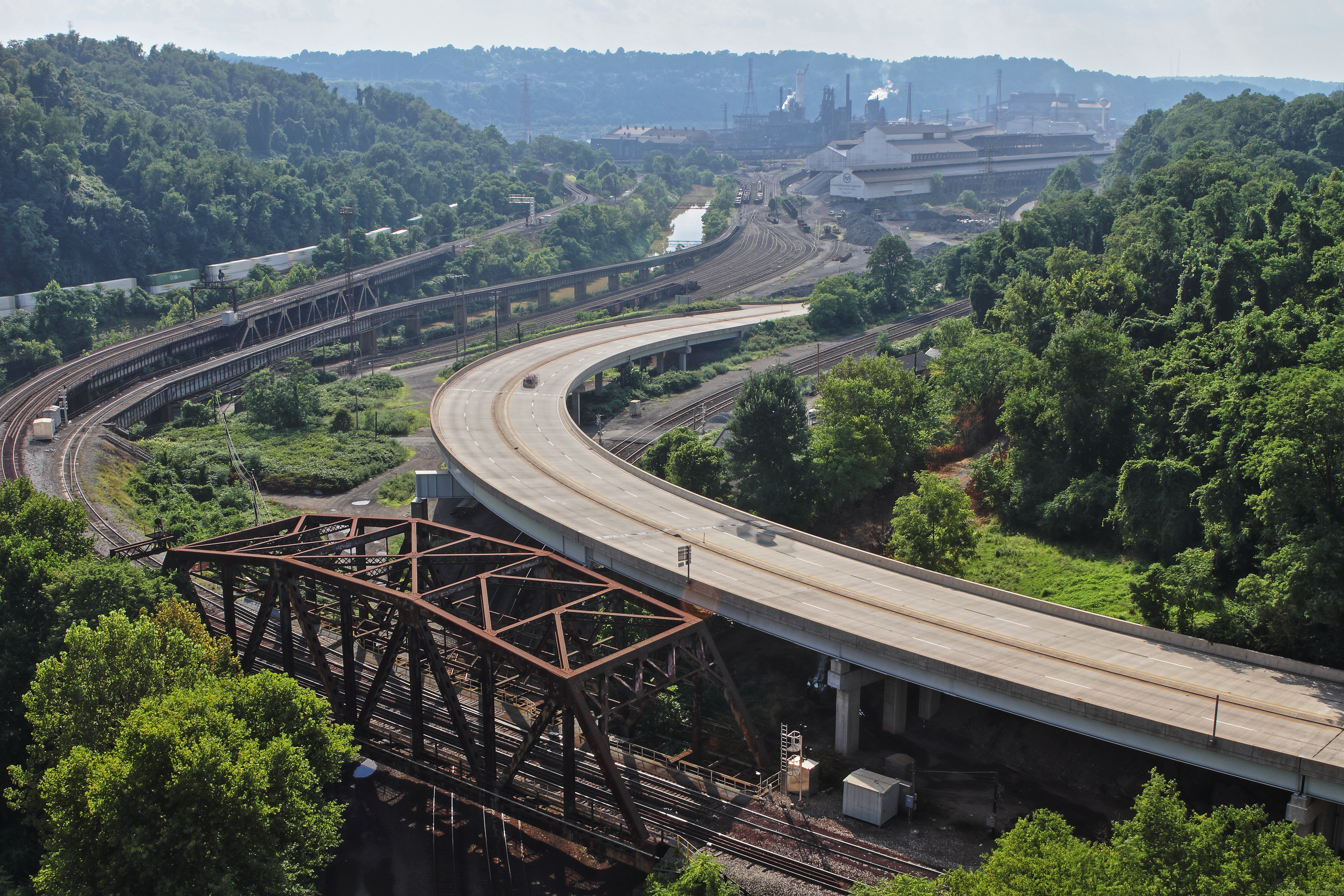
Edgar Thomson Steel Works as seen from George Westinghouse Bridge with Braddock Avenue in the foreground.

In the summer of 1872, while in Europe, Andrew Carnegie learned about the Bessemer process. He returned to Pittsburgh with plans to build his own Bessemer plant. Some of the partners, stockholders, and connected people were William Coleman, Andrew Kloman, Henry Phipps Jr., David McCandless, Wm. P. Shinn, John Scott, David A. Stewart, James Robb Wilson and Thomas M. Carnegie. The firm was known as Carnegie, McCandless, and Company. The plant was named after J. Edgar Thomson, who was the president of the Pennsylvania Railroad. Carnegie Brothers and Company was created by the consolidation of the steel businesses owned by Andrew Carnegie in the early 1880s. Those steel and coke works that were consolidated were:

- Edgar Thomson Steel Works
- Larimer Coke Works
- Lucy Furnaces
- Monastery Coke Works
- Scotia Ore Mines
- Union Iron Mills

The merging of these separate business operations into one resulted in the newly formed company owning an interest of nearly $5 million. On January 1, 1873, ground work began on the Edgar Thomson Steel Works in Braddock Township. It has been estimated that the plant was built for about $1.2 million. The mill was built by Alexander Lyman Holley, who found a manager to run the mill, Captain Bill Jones, a Civil War veteran. On August 22, 1875, the Edgar Thomson Steel Works' hulking Bessemer converter produced its first heat of liquid steel, destined to become 2,000 steel rails for the Pennsylvania Railroad. Within one year of beginning production the mill was able to create 32,228 tons of steel rail. The district was known as Bessemer, later incorporated as North Braddock.

Captain Jones described the steel mill writing, "This is the most powerful rail mill in the country; amongst its notable productions are a 62 lb. rail 120 feet long, rolled in five minutes from the time of drawing the bloom from the furnace and 600 rails 56 lb. per yard rolled in 11 1/2 hours." With continual improvements in production the mill was capable of producing 225 tons of steel rails per day. By the late 1880s James Gayley took over as manager of the plant.

In 1892, the workers of the plant took part in one of the most serious strikes in U.S. history. The Homestead Strike arose when Henry Clay Frick, an associate and partner of Carnegie, took over while Carnegie traveled to Scotland. Frick attempted to cut the wages of the steel workers. The steelworkers at the Duquesne and Edgar Thomson Works joined the strike and shut their mills down in sympathy. Frick took extreme measures. He brought in thousands of strikebreakers. When he sent in 300 Pinkerton guards to protect the strikebreakers, a riot broke out, resulting in 10 deaths and thousands of injuries. To prevent any further bloodshed, the governor, Robert Pattison, sent two brigades to stop the fighting. Carnegie, McCandless and Company began operations with non-union immigrant workers.

=== 20th century ===
In 1901, Carnegie sold the Carnegie Steel Company, including the Edgar Thomson Works, to J. P. Morgan, Elbert H. Gary and other investors, as part of the foundation of U.S. Steel.

In October, 1984 a Merrill Lynch analyst predicted that U.S. Steel would close Thomson within a few years. The plant survived the collapse of the steel industry in the 1980s, which shuttered famous plants, like the Homestead Steel Works in Homestead, or the National Tube Works in Mckeesport, and became the last integrated mill in the valley, an area which once contained 90,000 people employed in the basic steel industry.

== Operations ==
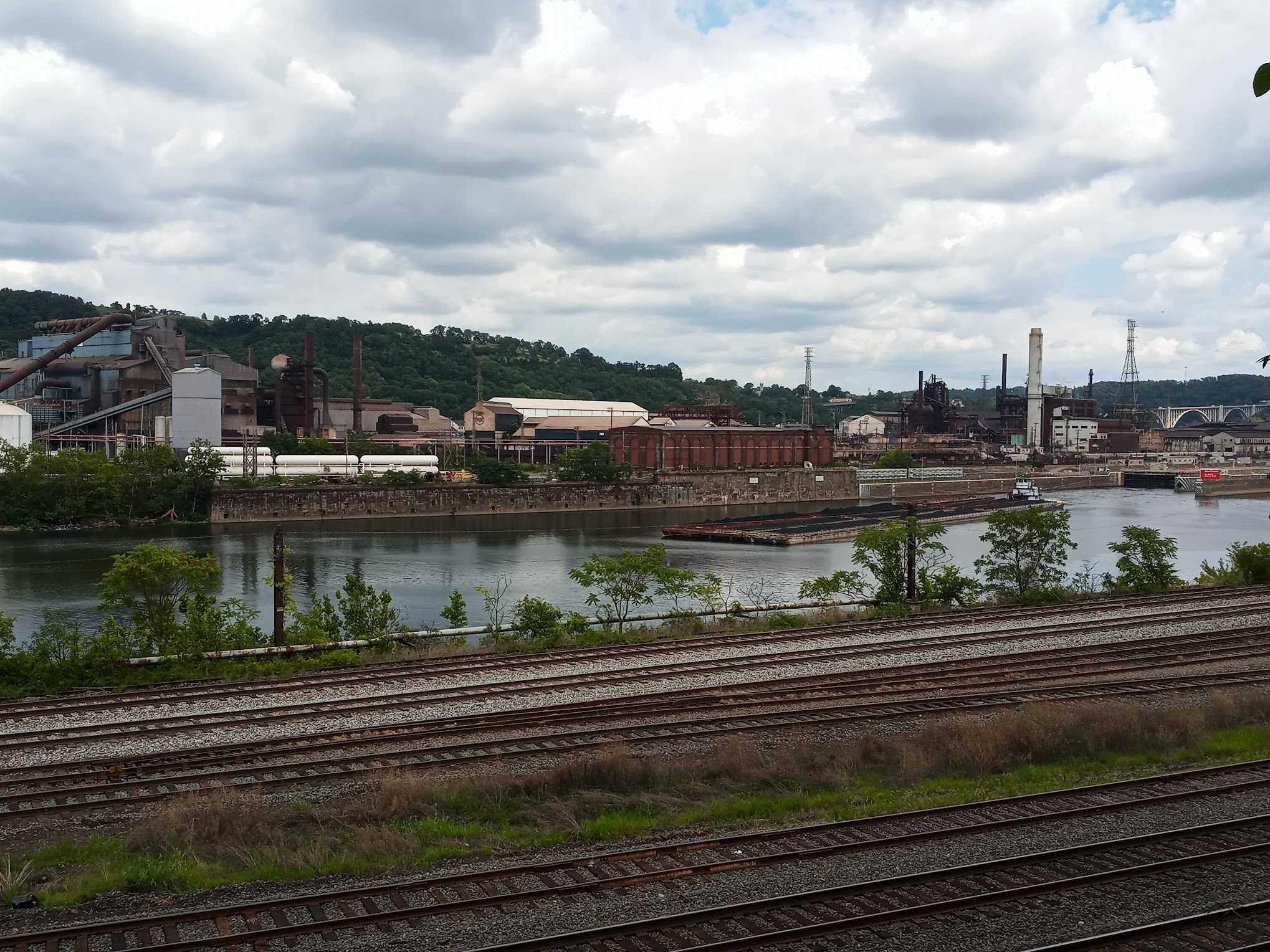
View of Edgar Thomson Steel Works from across the Monongahela River

Currently, two blast furnaces (Furnaces No. 1 and No. 3) continue in operation at the Edgar Thomson Steel Works, which remains part of U.S. Steel. In 2005, the mill produced 2.8 million tons of steel, equal to 28% of U.S. Steel's domestic production. The mill employs about 650 persons, some of whom belong to the second or third generations of their families to work in the mill.

Among improvements to its physical plant is a $250 million continuous caster, which converts liquid steel directly into slabs, installed in 1992.

In April 1995, the mill was designated a historic landmark by ASM International, a society that honors works of structural engineering. Other structures that have been honored by the society include the Statue of Liberty and the Eiffel Tower.

In May 2019, U.S. Steel announced a plan to invest more than $1 billion to the Mon Valley Works. The proposed upgrade included a sustainable endless casting and rolling facility at the Thomson Plant, and a co-generation facility at the Clairton Plant. The Mon Valley Works would have been the first facility in the United States to incorporate technology combining thin slab casting and hot rolled band production into one continuous process. The upgrade was cancelled in 2021.

Following the sale of U.S. Steel to Nippon Steel in 2025, an investment plan was announced for the Edgar Thomson Steel works. A $100 million investment was announced for a new slag recycler, which was permitted in February 2026 and will begin construction. Overall, Nippon has pledged a $2 billion investment into the aging mill by 2028, with upgrades including a new state-of-the-art hot strip mill.

== Images ==
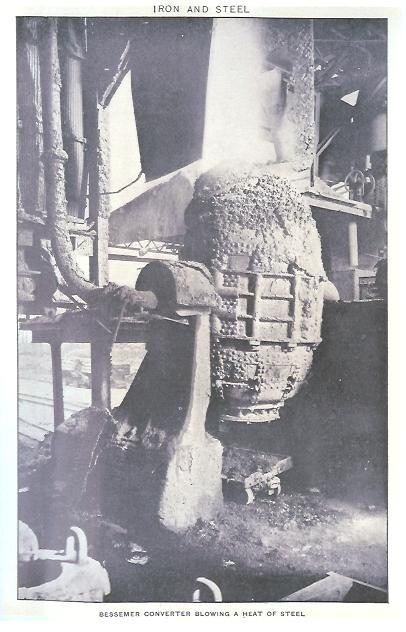
A Bessemer converter blowing a heat of steel

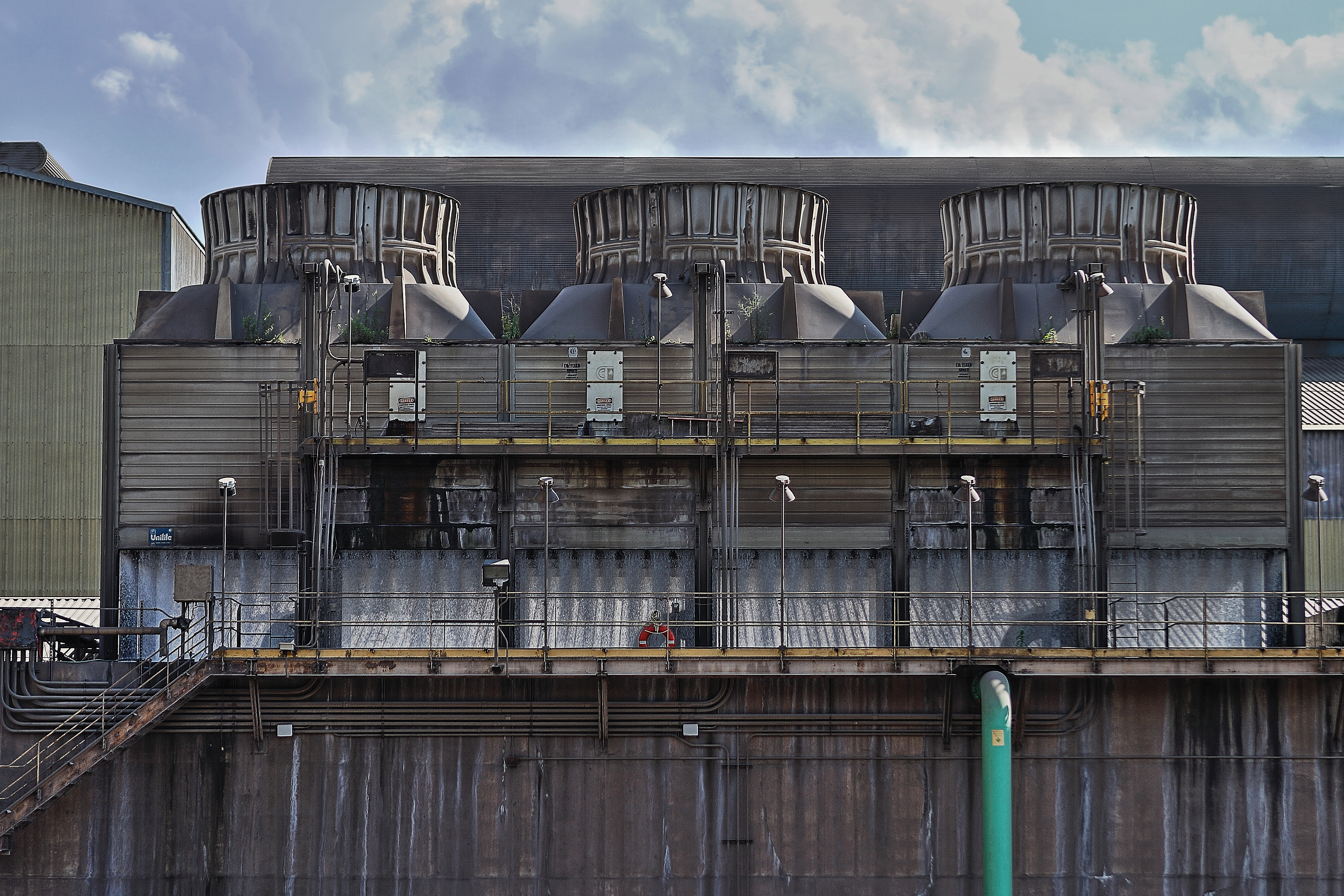
Temperature Exchanges at Edgar Thompson Plant of US Steel located in Braddock, Pennsylvania.

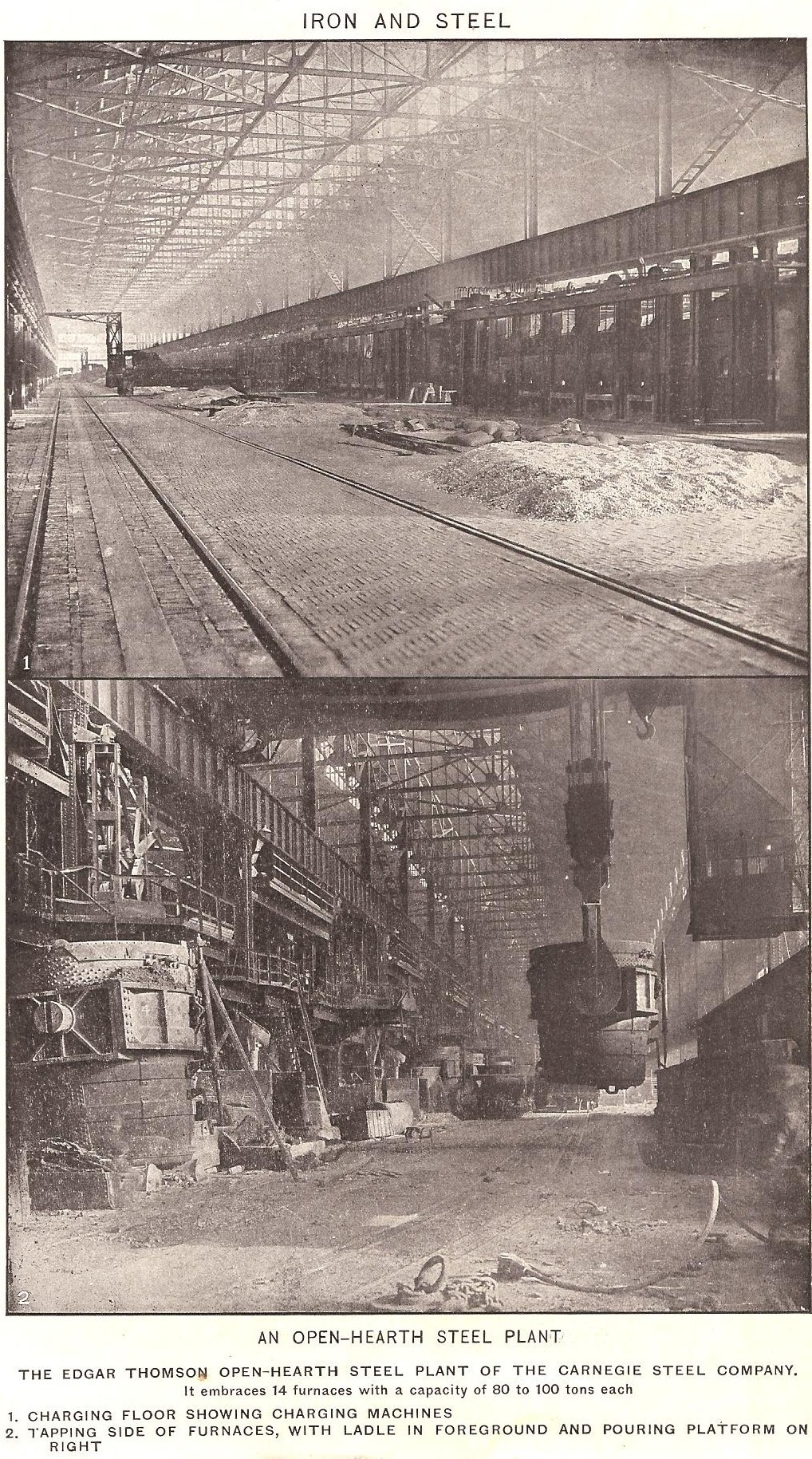
Inside of the plant, circa 1915

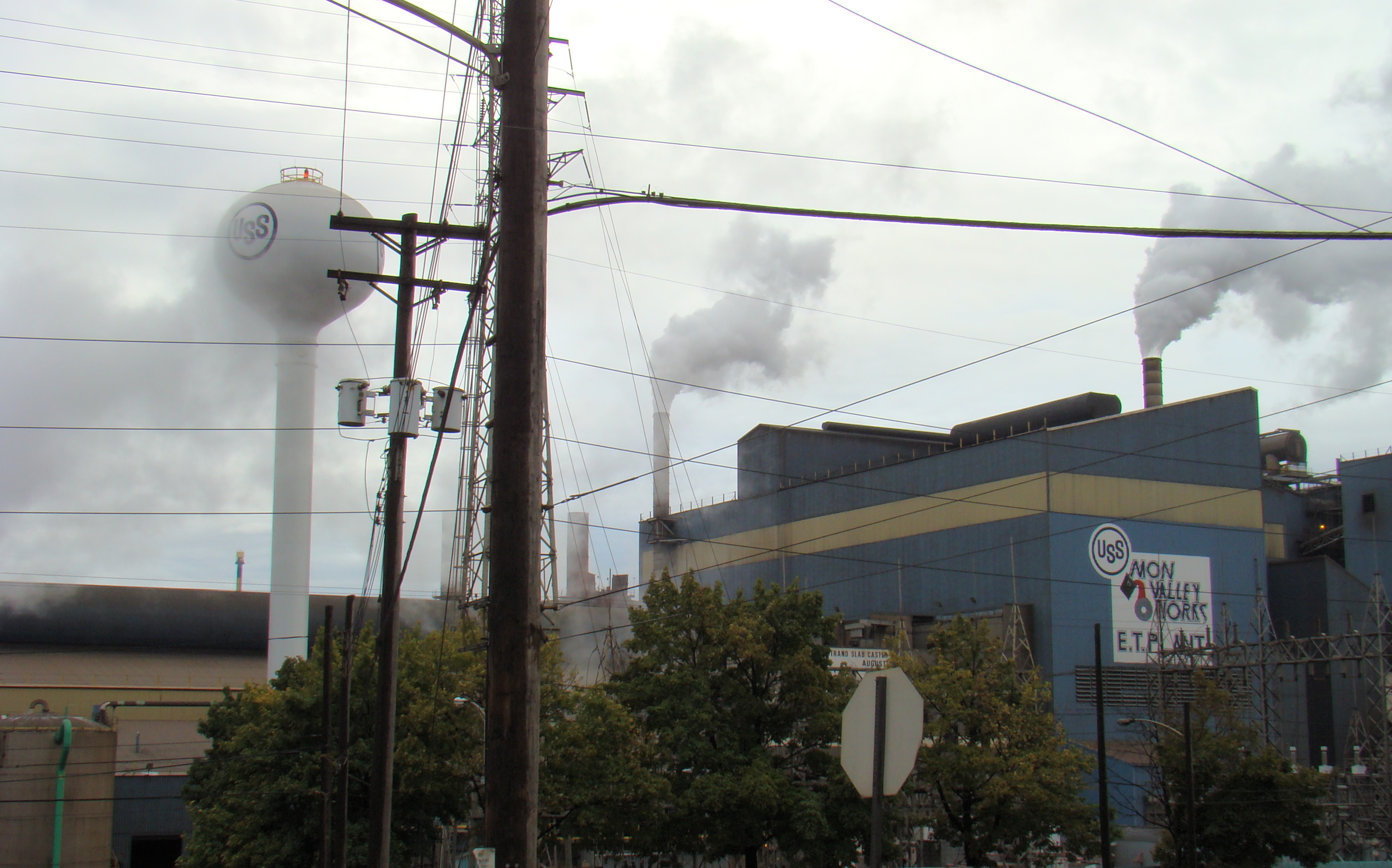
Works on October 26, 2007
