= Duck House =

Historic house in Georgia, United States

- U.S. National Register of Historic Places
- Location within Georgia Location within the United States
- Location: St. Marys, Georgia, U.S.
- Coordinates: 30°50′50″N 81°25′51″W
- NRHP reference No.: 84000938
- Added to NRHP: February 13, 1984

Duck House, part of the Richards estate, was a historic dwelling and is an archaeological site on Cumberland Island near St. Marys, Georgia. It was added to the National Register of Historic Places on February 13, 1984, and burned down a few years later from a fire started by an illegal camper.

During World War II the U.S. Coast Guard was stationed at Duck House. There is a Duck House Road and a Duck House Trail on the island.

Campgrounds were proposed for the Duck House area but ecological concerns scuttled the idea.

== See also ==
- Dungeness (Cumberland Island, Georgia)
