= Dungeness (Cumberland Island, Georgia) =

Historic district in Georgia, United States

Coordinates: 30.748441°N 81.47087°W

- Dungeness Historic District
- U.S. National Register of Historic Places
- U.S. Historic district
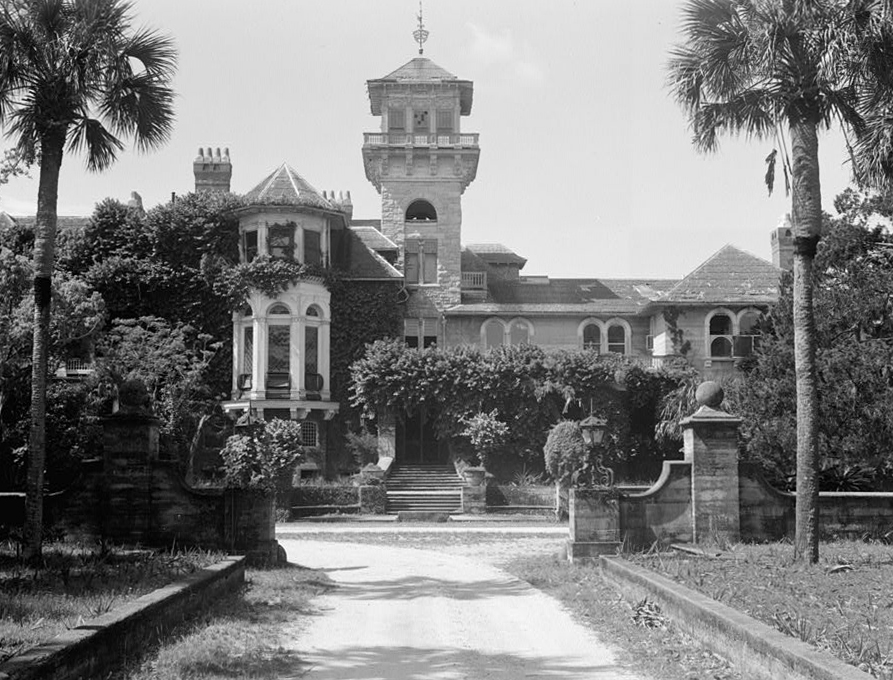
- Dungeness in 1958

- Location within Georgia Location within the United States
- Nearest city: St. Marys, Georgia
- Architect: Multiple
- Architectural style: Queen Anne, Shingle Style
- MPS: Cumberland Island National Seashore MRA
- NRHP reference No.: 84000920
- Added to NRHP: February 13, 1984

Dungeness on Cumberland Island, Georgia, is a ruined mansion that is part of a historic district that was the home of several families significant in American history. The mansion was named after a nearby sandy spit at the southern end of the island, first recorded in a land grant petition in 1765 and almost certainly named after the Dungeness headland, on the south coast of England. The first Dungeness house was the legacy of Revolutionary War hero Nathanael Greene, who had acquired 11,000 acres (45 km^{2}) of island land in 1783 in exchange for a bad debt. In 1800, his widow Catharine Miller (by then remarried) built a four-story tabby mansion over a Timucuan shell mound. During the War of 1812 the island was occupied by the British, who used the house as a headquarters.

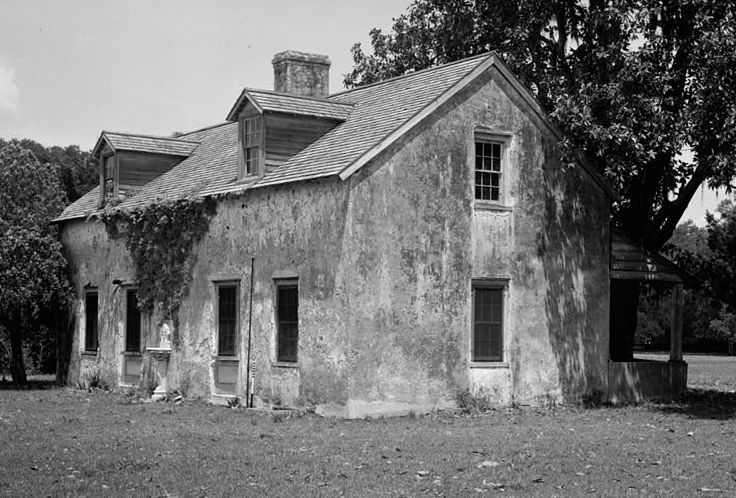
Greene Cottage or Tabby House

Dungeness Ruins

In 1818, Henry “Light-Horse Harry” Lee, a cavalry commander during the Revolutionary War and father of Robert E. Lee, stayed at the house until his death on March 25, 1818, cared for by Greene's daughter Louisa, and was laid to rest in a nearby cemetery with full military honors provided by an American fleet stationed at St. Marys, Georgia. The house was abandoned during the U.S. Civil War and burned in 1866.

In the 1880s the property was purchased by Thomas M. Carnegie, brother of Andrew Carnegie, who began to build a new mansion on the site. The 59-room Queen Anne style mansion and grounds were completed after Carnegie's death in 1886. His wife Lucy continued to live at Dungeness and built other estates for her children, including Greyfield for Margaret Carnegie Ricketson, Plum Orchard for George Lauder Carnegie, and Stafford Plantation. By this time, the Carnegies owned 90% of the island.

The Carnegies moved out of Dungeness in 1925. In 1959 the Dungeness mansion was destroyed by fire, alleged to be arson. The ruins are today preserved by the National Park Service as part of Cumberland Island National Seashore. They were acquired by the Park Service in 1972.

The main house comprises a portion of the larger historic district, which includes servant's quarters, utility buildings, laundries, cisterns, and a variety of other structures. The district forms a planned, landscaped ensemble. The most significant supporting structure is the Tabby House or Nathanael Greene Cottage, which dates to the Greene family's tenure.
