= Lucy Furnace =

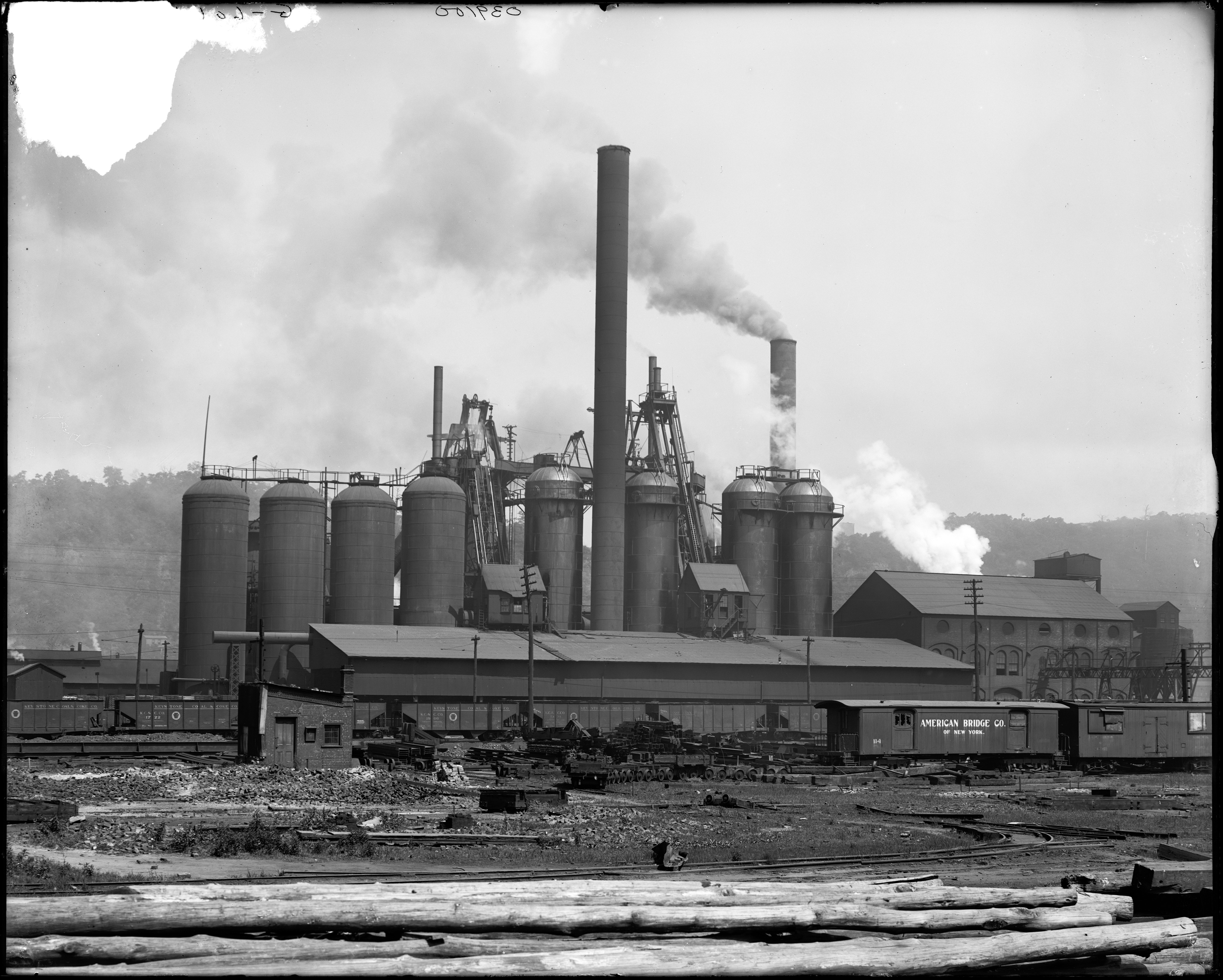
- The Lucy Furnace around 1900
- Built: 1871
- Location: Pittsburgh, Pennsylvania
- Coordinates: 40.481°N 79.959°W
- Industry: Steelmaking
- Style: Blast furnace
- Owner(s): Carnegie Steel, U.S. Steel
- Defunct: 1930

Lucy Furnace was a pair of blast furnaces in Pittsburgh, Pennsylvania, on the Allegheny River in Lawrenceville. The furnaces were part of the Carnegie Steel Company, with the first furnace erected in 1871 by brothers Andrew and Thomas M. Carnegie, Andrew Kloman and Henry Phipps Jr. This furnace was the first one built new by the Carnegies. In 1877 a second furnace, Lucy No. 2, was built at the same site.

Lucy was named after co-owner Thomas M. Carnegie's wife.

== History ==
=== Operation ===
The furnace entered blast in summer 1872, at the same time as the Isabella Furnace. Over the decades that they operated, the two furnaces developed a fierce rivalry. Prior to their construction, blast furnaces in the United States did not exceed about 50 tons of iron yield per day, and the prevailing attitude of operators was to follow "rule of thumb" methods and not to attempt anything beyond the rated capacity. Lucy and Isabella began an era of scientific refinement of the process, of relentless experimentation with ways of producing more iron output from a given amount of input ore, increasing throughput, and pushing the furnace beyond its design capacity. Owing to this approach and its large size (the 75-foot stack was larger than any previously constructed), the Lucy quickly became a leader in volume of production. By the end of its first year, it was making about 72 tons of pig iron a day. In October 1874, it produced over 100 tons daily.

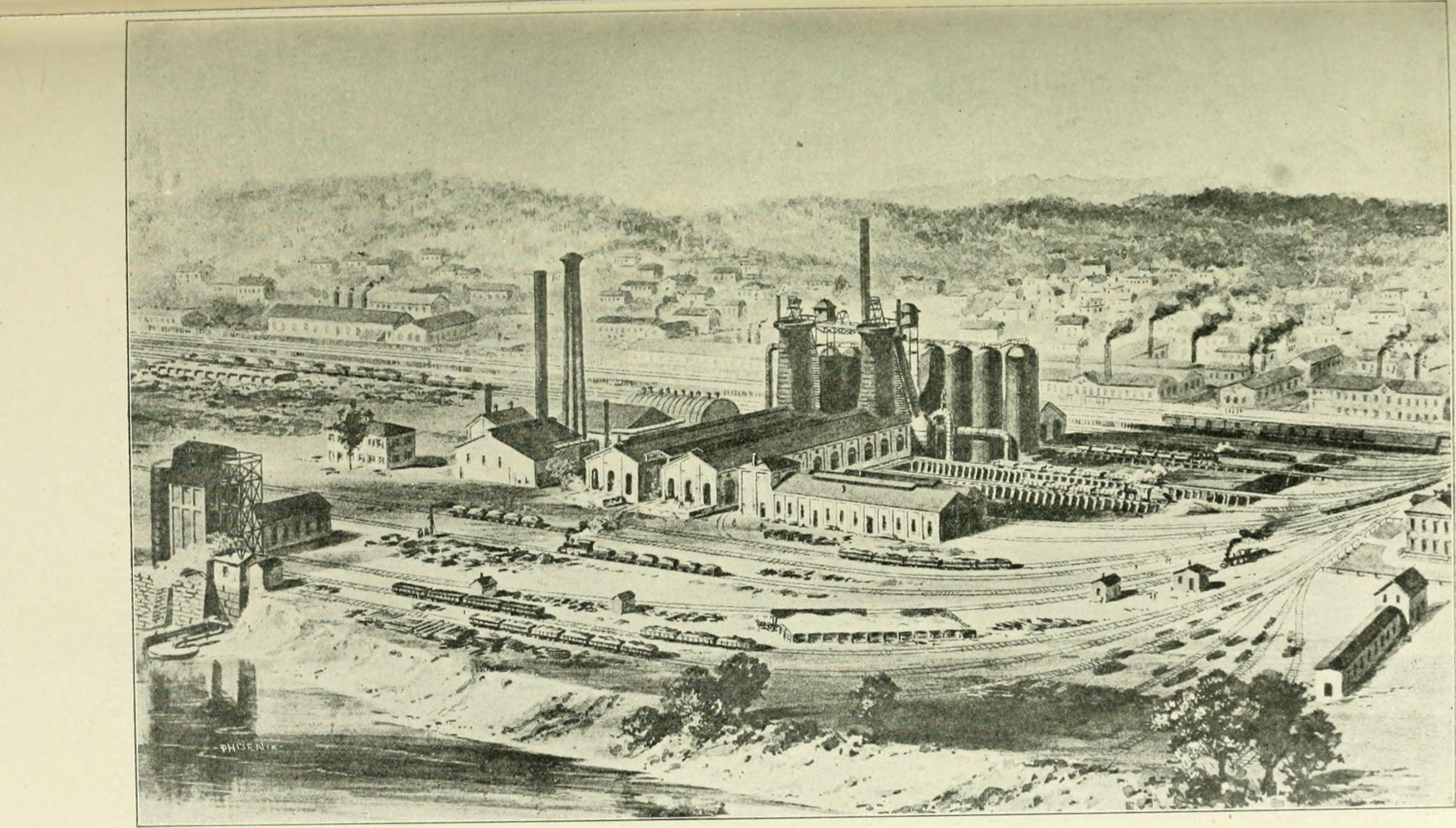
An illustration of The Lucy Furnace in 1886.

The record-setting production brought attention to Carnegie, and to Pittsburgh. Andrew Carnegie's aggressive approach was known as hard driving, and was controversial within the industry. In 1890, English metallurgist Sir Lowthian Bell denounced operation of the Lucy as "reckless," with the practices wrecking the lining of the furnace such that it had to be replaced every three years. Carnegie's superintendent responded: "What do we care about the lining? We think a lining is good for so much iron and the sooner it makes it the better." Unusually, Carnegie employed a chemist in the administration of the furnace, and credited having "almost the entire monopoly of scientific management" in making Lucy "the most profitable branch of our business."

Due to the early success of the first furnace and an increasing need for pig iron at Carnegie's Edgar Thomson Steel Works, a second furnace was erected in 1877. Both furnaces had a 75 foot stack with a 20 foot bosh (the lower portion of the furnace where melting occurs). In addition to their sheer size, a key to Lucy's prodigious output was their massive vertical steam reciprocating blowing engines, which provided 16,000 cfm of hot air at 9 psi. A typical furnace at the time provided only 7,500 cfm at 3 psi.

=== Disasters ===
Working in a blast furnace was dangerous at the time, and more so when the furnace is being pushed to its limits. In August 1877, seven men were working to repair the lining of a furnace at Lucy—which had been extinguished but had not cooled down—when their scaffolding gave way. They fell 35–40 feet onto red hot clinker at the bottom of the furnace. Two men died of burns before they could be rescued, and two others were fatally injured.

=== Decline ===
The furnace was rebuilt three times from the early 1870s, having been rebuilt on the same foundation each time. In later years, an additional furnace was constructed next to the original, which then became known as "No 1". The first furnace ceased operations on April 30, 1929, with the second ending its run a year later and each remained derelict for the next 8 years. The furnaces were dismantled in late 1937. The scrap from the furnace was retained by Carnegie-Illinois "for its own use".
