= Greyfield Inn =

Historic house in Georgia, United States

- Greyfield
- U.S. National Register of Historic Places
- U.S. Historic district
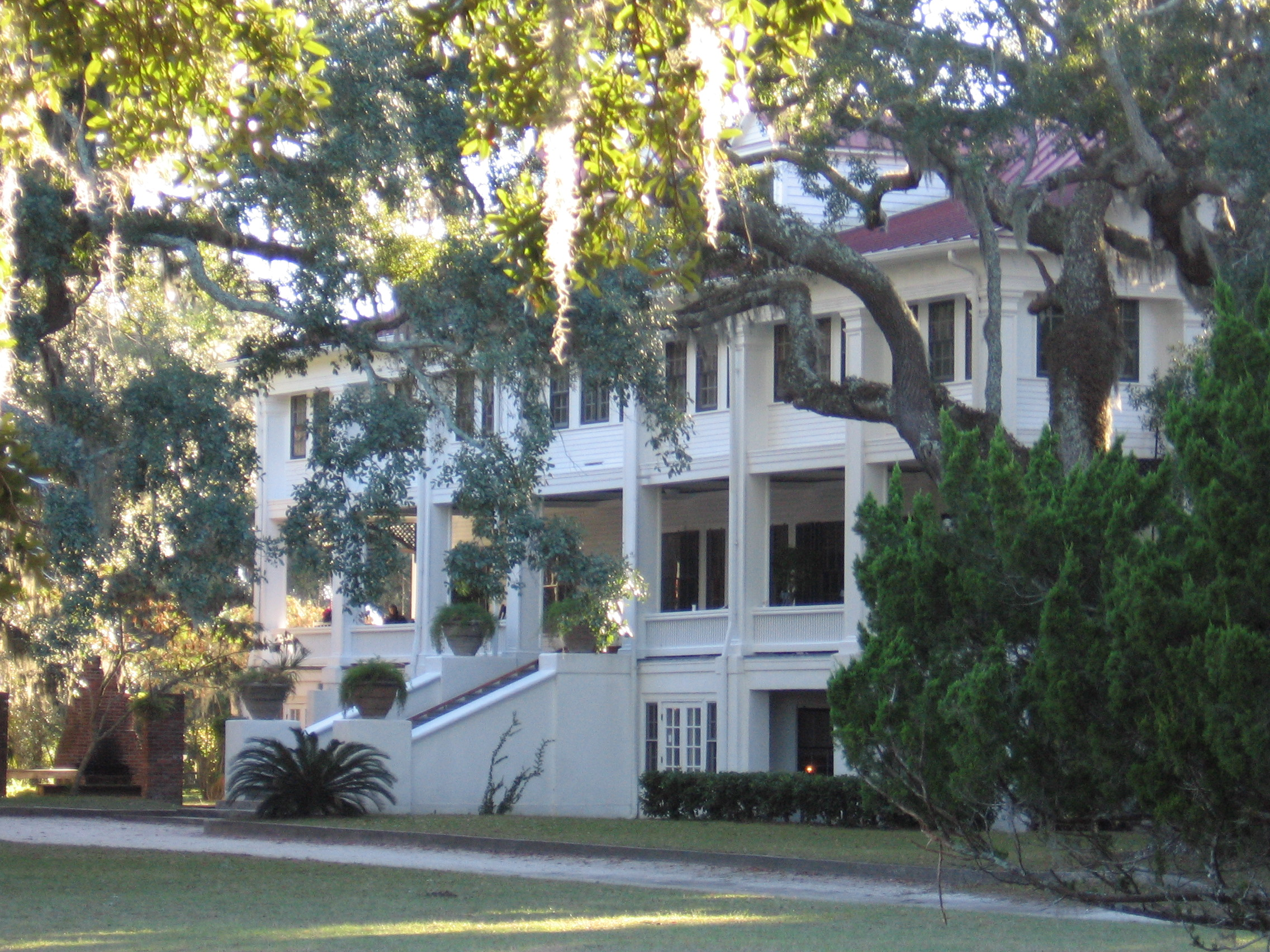

- Location within Georgia Location within the United States
- Location: Cumberland Island, Camden County, Georgia
- Coordinates: 30.77979°N 81.46854°W
- Area: 203 acres (0.82 km^{2})
- Built: 1901-1905
- Architect: MacClure & Spahr
- Architectural style: Colonial Revival
- MPS: Cumberland Island National Seashore MRA
- NRHP reference No.: 03000675
- Added to NRHP: July 24, 2003

Greyfield Inn is a hotel on Cumberland Island in Camden County, Georgia, the only hotel on the island. The inn is a member of Historic Hotels of America, the official program of the National Trust for Historic Preservation. It was opened to the public as an inn in 1962 in a Colonial Revival-style house named Greyfield located on an estate of the same name; it was listed on the National Register of Historic Places in 2003.

The NRHP-listed area is 203 acres (0.82 km^{2}) and includes six contributing buildings and four contributing structures.

== History ==
The house was built during 1901 to 1905 for Margaret Carnegie Ricketson and her husband Oliver Ricketson, and was one of several built for Carnegie family members within a large Carnegie family estate on Cumberland. Their daughter Lucy Carnegie Ferguson lived in the house for over seventy years. The Carnegie family owns and manages the Inn.

The house was built on a site known in 1900 as Gray's Field. The site apparently took its name from John W. Gray, a planter from Jekyll Island who in 1825 bought a 500-acre tract, then known as the Springs Plantation, south of the Stafford Plantation. The Springs was the site of a home built in the early 1800s by Martha Nightingale, a daughter of Nathanael Greene, and her husband.

On Sept. 21, 1996, the First African Baptist Church on the north end of the island was the location of the John F Kennedy Jr and Carolyn Bessette wedding.

== See also ==
- Carnegie family
