= Cumberland Island =

Island in the U.S. state of Georgia

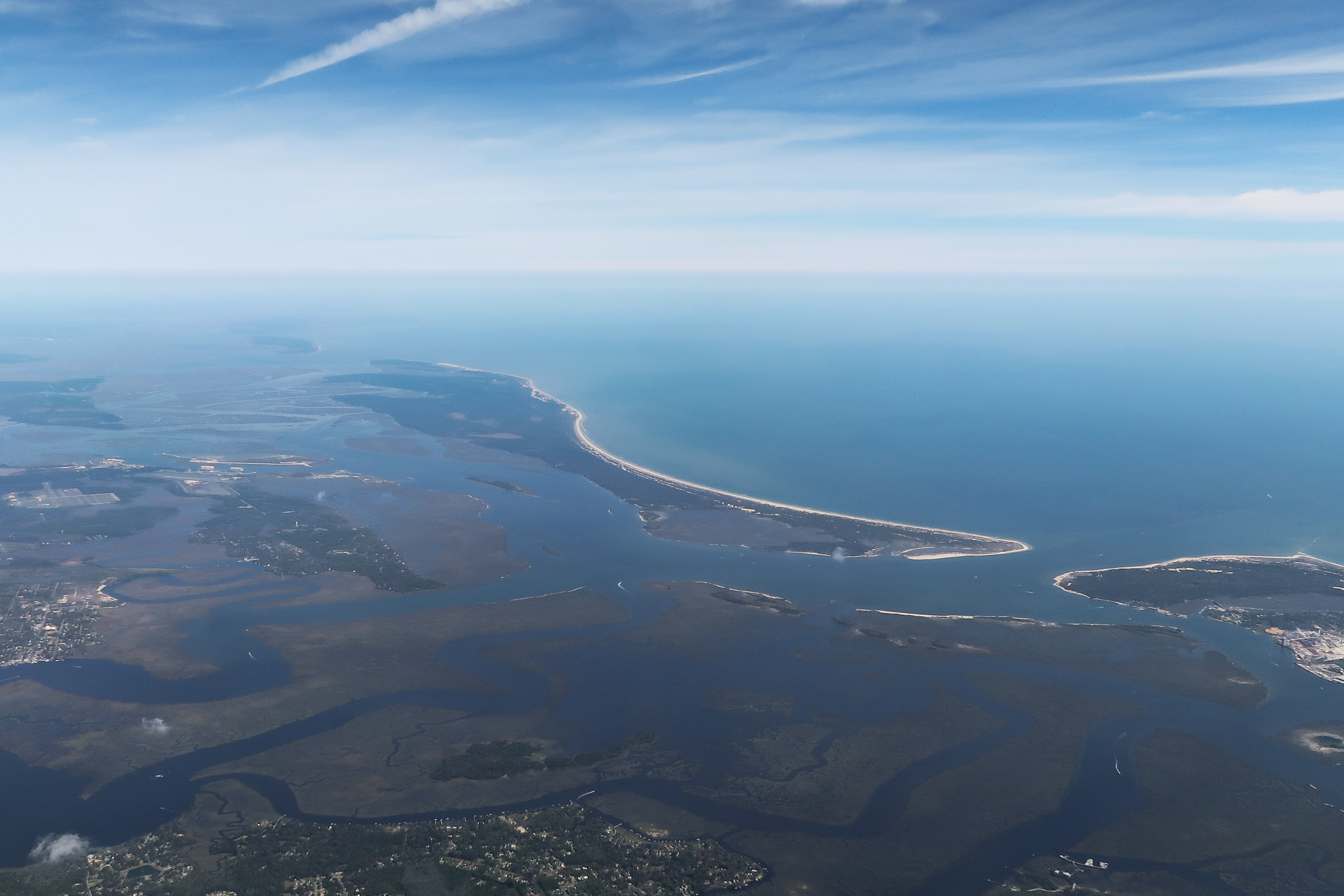
- Aerial view of Cumberland Island

- Location of Cumberland Island in Georgia
- Interactive map of Cumberland Island

Geography
- Location: Atlantic Ocean
- Coordinates: 30°51′04″N 81°26′54″W
- Archipelago: Sea Islands
- Area: 147.37 km^{2} (56.90 sq mi)
- Length: 17.5 mi (28.2 km)

Administration
- United States
- State: Georgia
- County: Camden County

Cumberland Island, in the southeastern United States, is the largest of the Sea Islands of Georgia. The long-staple Sea Island cotton was first grown here by a local family, the Millers, who helped Eli Whitney develop the cotton gin. With its unusual range of wildlife, the island has been declared a National Seashore. Little Cumberland Island is connected to the main island by a marsh.

== Geography ==
Cumberland Island forms part of Camden County, Georgia (30°51′N, 81°27′W). Cumberland Island constitutes the westernmost point of shoreline on the Atlantic Ocean in the United States. The island is 17.5 miles (28.2 km) long, with an area of 36,415 acres (147.37 km^{2} or 56.90 square miles), including 16,850 acres (68.2 km^{2}) of marsh, mudflats, and tidal creeks. There is no bridge to the island; it is reached by the Cumberland Ferry from St. Marys.

== Ecology ==
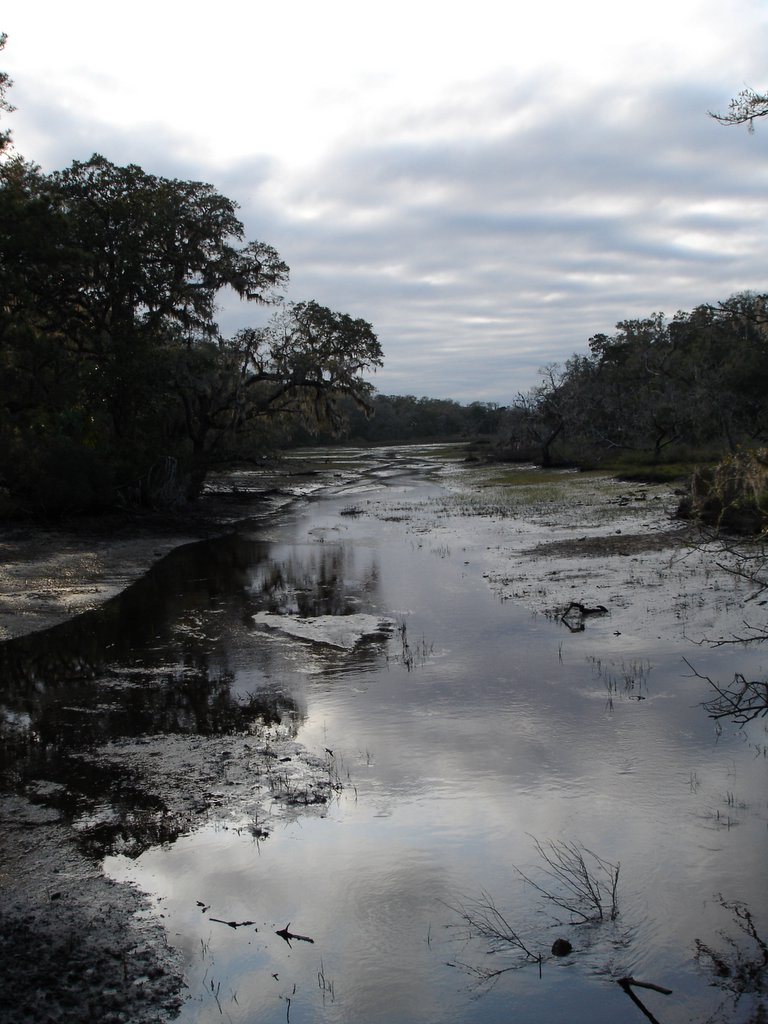
Marsh on Cumberland Island

The island has three major ecosystem regions. Along the western edge of the island there are large areas of salt marshes. The island is populated with gnarled live oak trees covered with Spanish moss as well as palmetto plants at the edge of Cumberland's dense maritime forest. Cumberland Island's most famous ecosystem is its beach, which stretches over 17 miles (27 km). The island is home to many native animals, as well as non-native species. There are white-tailed deer, squirrels, raccoons, nine-banded armadillos, wild boars, feral hogs, American alligators, as well as many marshland inhabitants. It is also famous for its feral horses, which roam free on the island.

== History ==
=== Native American settlement ===
The first inhabitants were indigenous peoples who settled there as early as 4,000 years ago. Later inhabitants participated in the Savannah archaeological culture and spoke the Timucua language. Its inhabitants were part of the Mocama, a Timucua group who spoke the Mocama dialect. In the 17th century the island and the adjacent coast were controlled by the Tacatacuru chiefdom. The main village, known as Tacatacuru, was located towards the southern end of the island; during the time of European colonization, the Spanish recorded the names of at least six more villages on the island, and eleven more were located on the mainland.

=== Colonial settlement ===
During the 16th and 17th centuries, Cumberland Island was part of the Mocama missionary province of Spanish Florida. When the Spanish arrived in the 1550s, they named the island San Pedro. They built a garrison and mission, San Pedro de Mocama, in 1603. It was one of the main mission centers, situated at a major Mocama site. Another Spanish mission on Cumberland was Puturiba, which operated from 1595 to 1597. An additional mission, San Phelipe, was relocated from the North Newport River to the northern end of Cumberland from 1670 to 1684.

Historical records indicate that until 1681, there were approximately 300 natives and several Spanish missionary priests living on Cumberland Island. In 1683, French pirates attacked Cumberland Island, looting and burning many of the buildings. Many of the natives and the Spanish missionaries fled the island. An attack in 1684 by a pirate known to the Spanish as Thomas Jingle led to the final abandonment of the island by the Spaniards. Survivors retreated to St. Augustine to the south. During the colonial years, many had died of exposure to European infectious diseases, to which they had no natural immunity. The Tacatacuru relocated closer to St. Augustine, and Cumberland Island was thereafter occupied by the Yamasee. By then most of the Mocama had converted to Roman Catholicism as taught to them by the Spanish priests before the island was abandoned.

English General James Oglethorpe arrived at the Georgia coast in 1733. In 1735 he made a treaty with the Creek nation, who claimed historic ownership of the coastal islands between the Savannah River and St. Johns River. Under the treaty most of the islands, including Cumberland Island, were ceded to England, thus conflicting with the Spanish claim to the islands. The name of Cumberland Island was given by a young Yamacraw named Toonahowi (the nephew of Chief Tomochichi who visited England with Oglethorpe.) He suggested the island be named for William Augustus, the 13-year-old Prince William, Duke of Cumberland, son of King George II.

In 1736 Oglethorpe established a fort at what is now Terrapin Point in the north of the island, named Fort St. Andrews. For a decade the small village of Berrimacke existed near the fort. In 1740 he built a second fort at the southern point of the island called Fort William. The forts were built to defend English settlements to the north from the Spanish in Florida.

After the English defeated the Spanish in the Battle of Bloody Marsh in 1742, the need for the forts ended. They abandoned the forts and eventually the village disappeared. No trace remains today of Fort William, and most signs of Fort St. Andrews have been washed away.

In the 1760s, the island was divided into royal grants but saw little activity. When naturalist William Bartram visited the island in 1774, the island was mostly uninhabited.

=== Plantation era ===
The Revolutionary War hero Nathanael Greene founded most of southern Cumberland Island as a result of a business deal used to finance the army. Greene died in 1786. His wife, Catharine Littlefield Greene, remarried Phineas Miller ten years later; and they built a huge, four-story tabby mansion on top of a Native American shell mound. She named it Dungeness, after a nearby sandy spit at the southern end of the island, first recorded in a land grant petition in 1765 and almost certainly named after the Dungeness headland, on the south coast of England.

The mansion featured 6-foot (1.8 m) thick walls at the base, four chimneys and 16 fireplaces, and was surrounded by 12 acres (49,000 m^{2}) of gardens. Dungeness was the site of many special social galas, where statesmen and military leaders enjoyed the Millers' hospitality. When the island was briefly occupied during the War of 1812, the British used Dungeness as their headquarters. They also freed the American slaves on the island. The Millers' Dungeness burned down in 1866.

The Millers were the first major planters of Sea Island cotton on Cumberland. They held a total of 210 slaves to work the plantation. Catharine and Phineas Miller helped Eli Whitney develop the cotton gin, debuted in 1793.

While Sea Island cotton was by far the largest and most valuable commercial crop, other documented agricultural products such as indigo, rice, and food crops were also grown. Rice sloughs are still visible on the island through satellite imagery. According to national oral history, live oak wood from the island was used to build the USS Constitution, "Old Ironsides", in the 1790s.

In 1818, an ill General "Lighthorse" Harry Lee, a Revolutionary War hero and old friend of Catharine Greene, was returning from the West Indies when he asked to be taken to Dungeness. After a month of illness, he died on March 25 and was buried on the island. His son, Confederate General Robert E. Lee, had a tombstone placed over the grave and visited his father's final resting place several times. In 1913, the body of Harry Lee was reinterred at Lexington, Virginia, to lie beside his famous son, but his gravestone was left on Cumberland Island.

By the time of the Civil War, Robert Stafford had become the major planter and landowner on Cumberland Island and one of the largest planters in Camden County. His grave is on the main road of the island.

=== Carnegie Family era ===
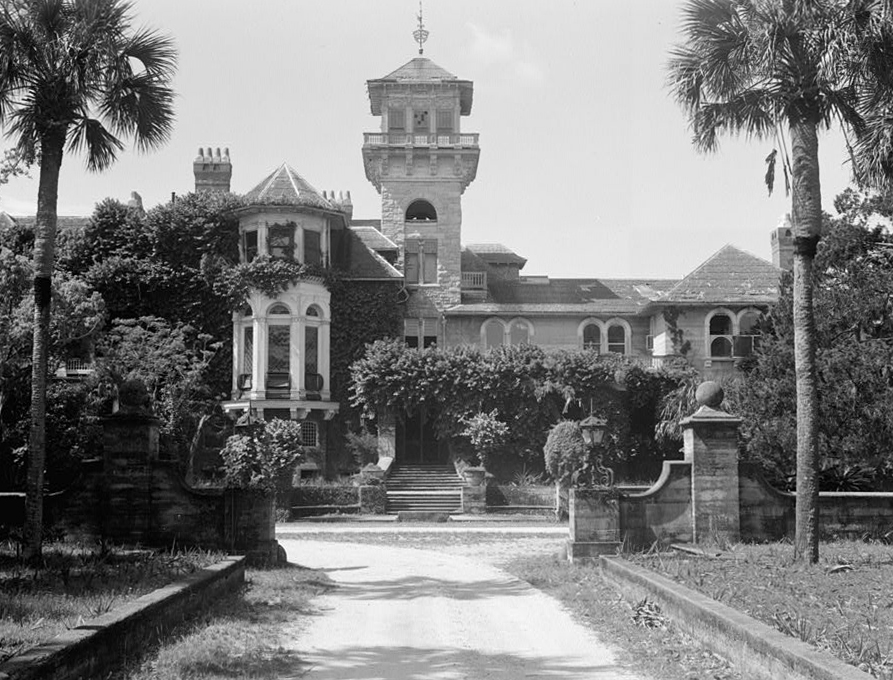
Dungeness Mansion before 1959 fire on Cumberland Island National Seashore

In the 1880s Thomas M. Carnegie, brother of steel magnate Andrew Carnegie, and his wife Lucy bought land on Cumberland for a winter retreat. In 1884, they began building a mansion on the site of Dungeness, though Carnegie never lived to see its completion. Lucy and their nine children continued to live on the island, naming their mansion Dungeness after that of Greene. Dungeness was designed as a 59-room castle. They also built pools, a golf course, and 40 smaller buildings to house the 200 servants who worked at the mansion. The last time Dungeness was used was for the 1929 wedding of a Carnegie daughter. After the crash and the Great Depression, the family left the island and kept the mansion vacant. It burned in a 1959 fire, believed to have been started by a poacher who had been shot in the leg by a caretaker weeks before. Today, the ruins of the mansion remain on the southern end of the island. The Carnegie family owned 90% of the island.

Lucy Carnegie had additional estates built on the island for her children. These include:

- Greyfield, built in 1900, now a private inn owned by the Carnegie family.
- Plum Orchard, donated to the National Park Service in 1972, which maintains it and gives daily tours.
- Stafford Plantation, privately owned by members of the Carnegie family. The caretaker of the estate (nearby homes and an air-strip) and his family live in the residence.

=== North end ===
In the late 18th and early 19th centuries, small farmers settled on the north end of the island. Other island residents at this time worked as innkeepers and pilots for St. Andrews Sound. One of these pilots, James Clubb, directed the Wanderer (the last ship to bring slaves from Africa to the United States) to nearby Jekyll Island in 1858. These north end families owned some slaves, and during the Civil War, most of these people moved to the mainland when Union forces occupied the island.

Former slaves and their descendants continued to live on the island after the American Civil War. According to historian Mary Bullard, one community existed in the Brick Hill area of the island between 1862 and 1891. Many of these freedmen were farmers. In the 1880s, another community formed at what is now called "The Settlement". It was a residential area for black workers, as Georgia had passed laws requiring racial segregation of housing and public facilities. The First African Baptist Church, established in The Settlement in 1893, was rebuilt in the 1930s. It is one of the few remaining structures of this community.

In the late 19th and early 20th centuries, innkeeping was the primary business on the north end. The most prosperous hotel was located in the High Point area and attracted guests who belonged to the rising middle class. Visitors arrived on steamboats and enjoyed activities such as fishing, hunting, and going to the beach. At the height of the innkeeping era in the 1890s, guests numbered around 750. Black residents of the north end staffed the hotel: they served as waiters, cooks, laundresses, and drivers of the horse-drawn trolleys that transported guests. Hotel Cumberland at High Point was sold in 1918 and became a private club. The Candler family of Atlanta, associated with Coca-Cola, owned part of the north end.

John F. Kennedy Jr. and Carolyn Bessette were married on Cumberland Island in 1996, in the First African Baptist Church with their reception taking place at the historic Greyfield Inn. While they filled the church's eight pews with friends and family, no media were permitted at the event.

== Present-day conservation ==
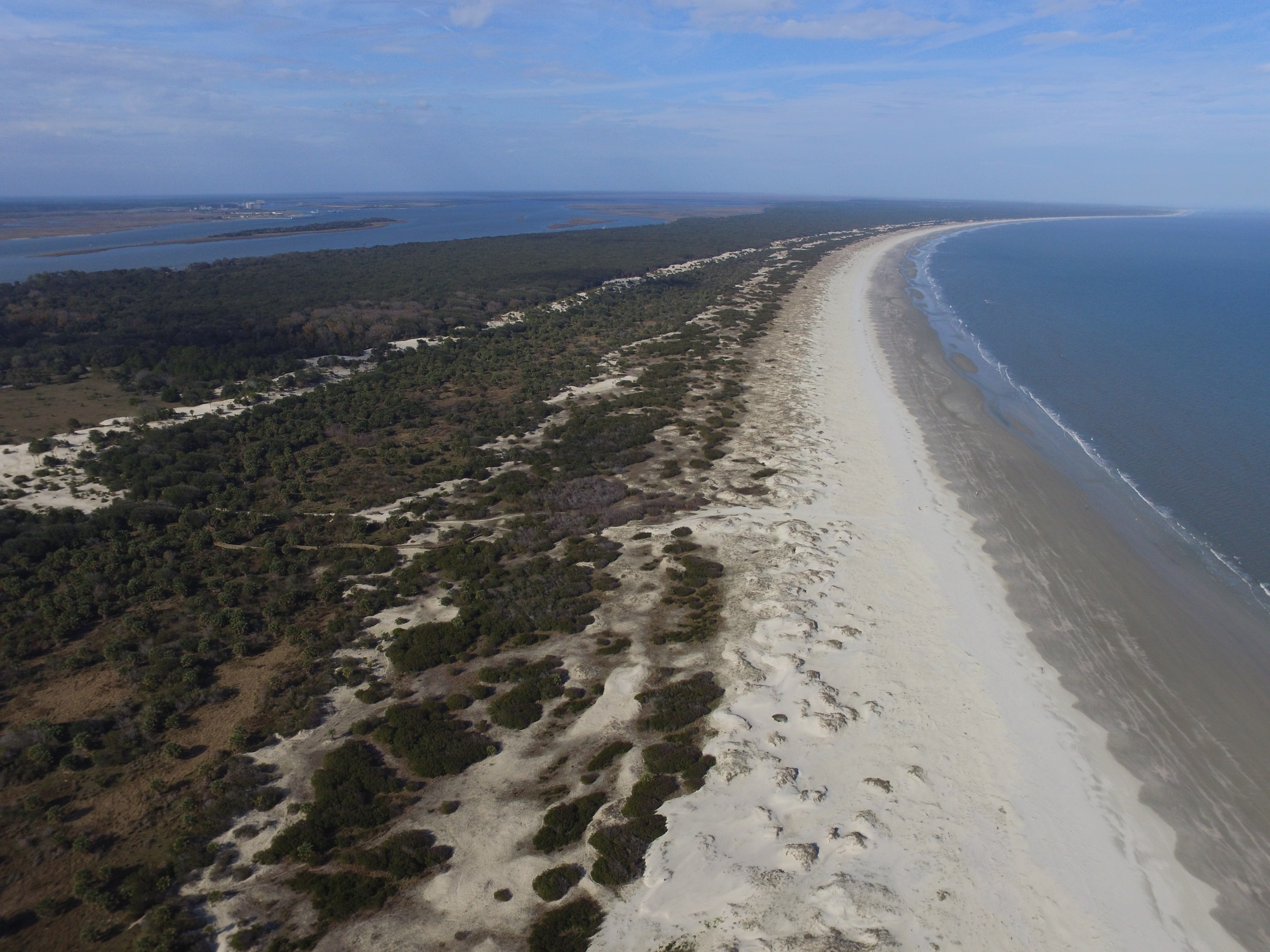
Looking North from Dungeness runway. Kings Bay Naval Submarine Base can be seen in the upper left.

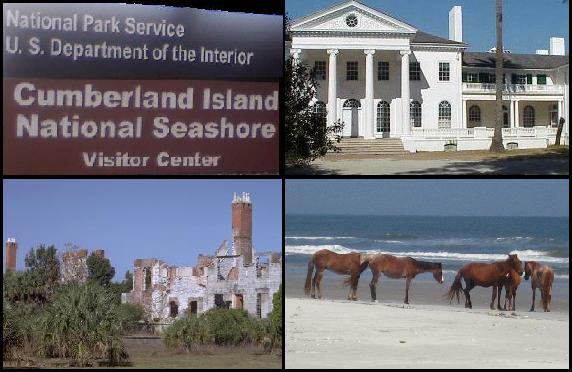

In 1954, some of the members of the Carnegie family invited the National Park Service to the island to assess its suitability as a National Seashore. In 1955, the National Park Service named Cumberland Island as one of the most significant natural areas in the United States and plans got underway to secure it. Simultaneously, the State of Georgia was working on plans to secure the island as a state park. Plans to create a National Seashore were complicated when, in October 1968, Carnegie descendants sold three thousand acres of the island to real estate developer Charles Fraser, who had developed part of Hilton Head Island, South Carolina. Fraser met with conservationist and then Sierra Club executive director, David Brower, on the island to discuss how to develop the area. This meeting and discussions between Fraser and Brower were documented in one part of the book Encounters with the Archdruid by John McPhee who traveled with Fraser and Brower as they toured Cumberland Island. Brower pushed for a 90/10 split, with 90% of the land to remain undeveloped.

However, the thought of any additional development on the island beyond the structures already erected by the Carnegies and Sam Candler, who also owned part of the island, caused activists, politicians, members of the Carnegie and Candler families, and a number of organizations, including the Georgia Conservancy and the Sierra Club, to band together and push Fraser to sell to the National Park Foundation. They, along with others, also helped push a bill through the US Congress that established Cumberland Island as a national seashore. The bill was signed by President Richard Nixon on October 23, 1972. The Carnegie family sold the island to the federal government. With donations from the Mellon Foundation, Cumberland Island became a unit of the National Park Service, designated Cumberland Island National Seashore.

=== Current land ownership ===
Cumberland Island is actually two islands—the island proper and Little Cumberland Island—connected by a marsh. Little Cumberland is a separate island and not a part of Cumberland Island. As are the private properties on Cumberland Island, Little Cumberland Island has been maintained with a nature and conservation mission for over 60 years. Historically, portions of Cumberland Island remain in private hands. Large areas were deeded to the National Parks Foundation by members or heirs of the Carnegie family in 1971. Other lands in private ownership were purchased with funds provided by the Mellon Foundation and Congress, and in 1972 Cumberland Island was designated a national seashore. A small number of property owners, principally ones who preserved the island and protected it from massive commercial development, still own their homes and other private property on the southern, western and northern regions of the island. Some, however, have sold their property to the National Park Service (NPS), with an agreement that retains their ownership and full property rights during their lifetime. Eventually, their property will be owned by the National Park Service.

=== Cumberland Island seashore ===
Since the national seashore was established, a Navy nuclear submarine base has been built on the mainland opposite, which requires frequent dredging to the river so that it will be deep enough.

A project to construct a spaceport, known as Spaceport Camden, has proposed to launch rockets from a rural site on the mainland four miles west of Cumberland Island National Seashore.

This area hosts endangered right whales as well as many other forms of sea life, including sea turtles and dolphins.

== See also ==
- Cumberland Island National Seashore
- Cumberland Island Horse

NRHP sites on Cumberland Island

- Duck House
- Dungeness
- Little Cumberland Island Light
- Plum Orchard
- Stafford Plantation

== Relevant literature ==
- Ruckdeschel, Carol. 2017. A Natural History of Cumberland Island, Georgia. Macon, GA: Mercer University Press.
