= Thomas M. Carnegie =

American businessman (1843–1886)

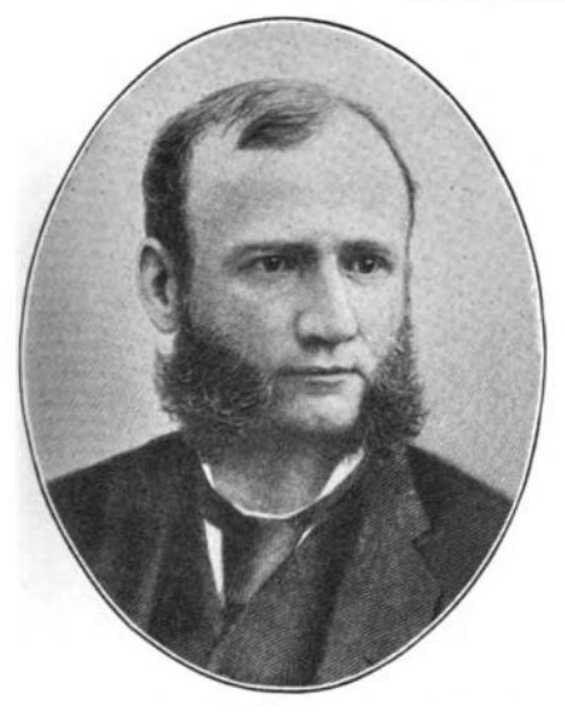
- Born: Thomas Morrison Carnegie; October 2, 1843; Dunfermline, Scotland
- Died: October 19, 1886 (aged 43); Pittsburgh, Pennsylvania, U.S.
- Occupation: Business magnate
- Spouse: Lucy Ackerman Coleman (m. 1866)
- Children: 9
- Relatives: Carnegie family

Thomas Morrison Carnegie (October 2, 1843 – October 19, 1886) was a Scottish-born American industrialist. He was the brother of steel magnate Andrew Carnegie and co-founder of the Edgar Thomson Steel Works (a steel manufacturing company).

== Early life ==
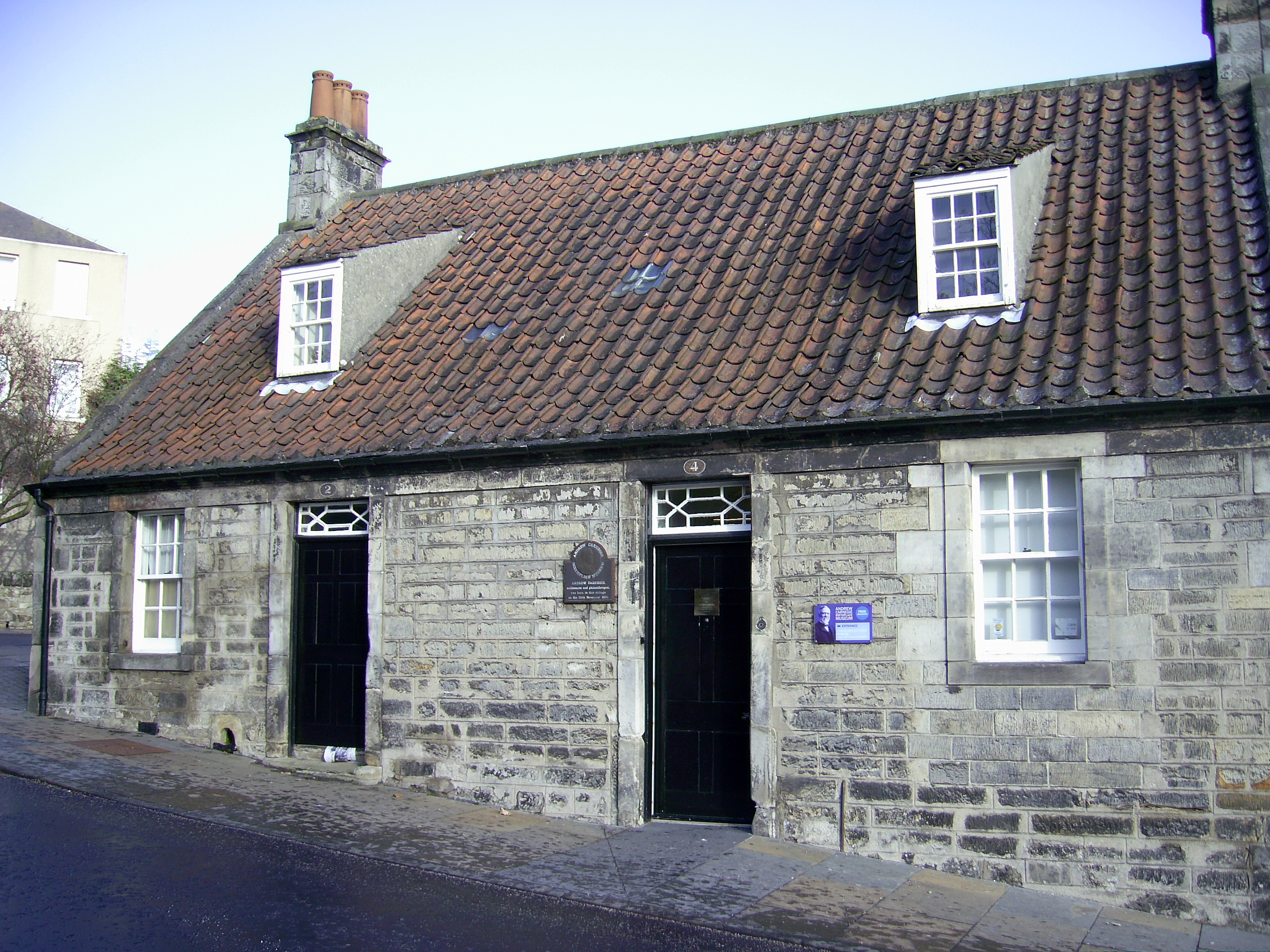
Birthplace of Thomas Carnegie in Dunfermline, Scotland.

He was born in Dunfermline, Fife, Scotland, on October 2, 1843. His parents were Will and Margaret Carnegie, and he had a brother, Andrew, who was eight years older. A sister, Ann, had been born in 1840 but died in infancy. His first cousin was future industrialist George Lauder. His father was a master weaver, and his mother sold food in the home and sewed soles on leather boots to help provide income. Left destitute by automation (which threw his father, a hand weaver, out of work), the family emigrated to the United States in 1848 and settled in "Slabtown"—an immigrant neighborhood in Allegheny City, at the time a distinct and fast-growing city on the north side of the Allegheny and Ohio Rivers across from Pittsburgh, Pennsylvania. The family rented rooms from a relative who owned a house at 336 Rebecca Street. (The street is gone, replaced by Three Rivers Stadium football stadium.) Allegheny City was an unpleasant place to live. It had no municipal water system until 1848, no natural gas lines until 1853, and no sewer system, and wild hogs roamed the streets attacking children. There, Thomas attended local public school.

As a boy, Thomas Carnegie was "the beautiful white-haired child with lustrous black eyes, who everywhere attracted attention". He was generally considered well-mannered but reserved, and often went into a quiet room during social gatherings. He was also noted for his quick and wry sense of humor. And while some, such as Andrew Carnegie biographer Joseph Frazier Wall have concluded that Margaret Carnegie secretly favored Thomas, others such as Richard S. Tedlow disagree and conclude that Thomas was largely isolated and lonely within the extended Carnegie family and their large coterie of friends. It is well documented that Andrew and Thomas did not have the same group of friends, and that Thomas' group was smaller. In time, Thomas Carnegie became a lifelong heavy drinker.

== Career ==
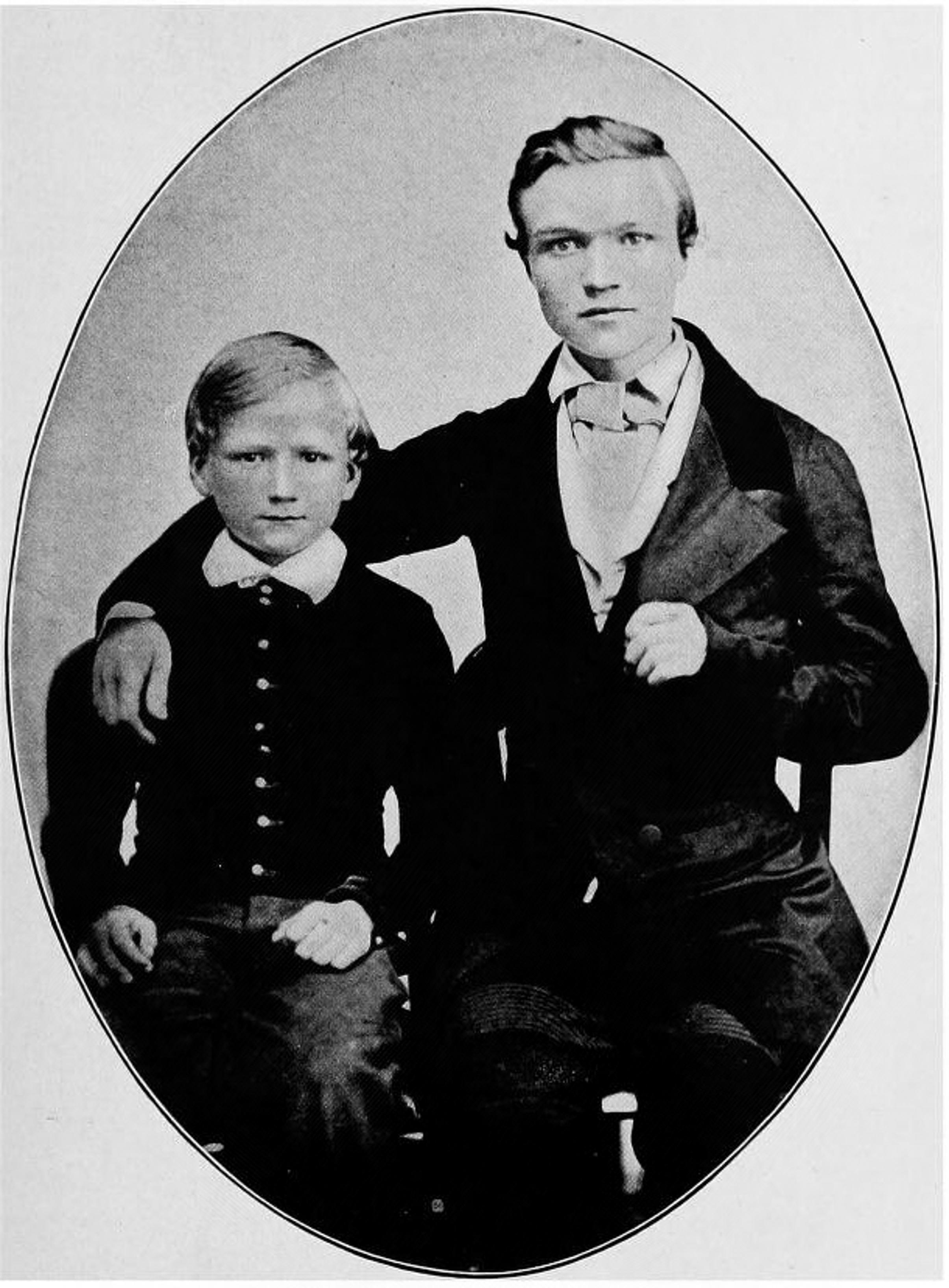
Thomas Carnegie, age 12, with his older brother, Andrew.

His older brother Andrew made a good deal of money from stock investing, and in 1853 purchased their rented home on Rebecca Street. In 1858, after Andrew had been appointed Thomas Scott's assistant, the Carnegie family sold their Rebecca Street home and bought a large home in Altoona. Andrew was appointed superintendent of the western division of the Pennsylvania Railroad in 1859, and he made Thomas (who had quit school) his assistant. (This was not the end of Thomas' schooling. As an adult, he would later take classes at Duff College.)

In 1859, the family moved back to Pittsburgh and resided at 10 Hancock Street (later renamed Eighth Street, and now part of the Downtown Pittsburgh central business district). But the pollution from nearby factories and iron forges proved too much, and after only a few short months on Hancock Street, Andrew purchased a Victorian home for Thomas and their mother in Homewood, then a middle-class village on the edge of Pittsburgh. Andrew and Thomas rode the train to and from work together, and attended the theater frequently.

In 1861, Andrew persuaded Thomas to invest in the Columbia Oil Company, and it paid off handsomely. That Andrew Carnegie should ask an 18-year-old boy to be a stock investor was not unusual. When Andrew traveled to Scotland with his mother and a friend in 1862, he left Thomas in charge of his numerous business affairs (assets by that time nearing $47,860 or roughly $8.5 million in 2009 inflation-adjusted dollars).

=== Union Iron Mills ===
Thomas' business ventures were often pulled along in the wake of his older brother's interests, and he made his fortune in iron and steel because of Andrew. In 1861, Thomas N. Miller, Henry Phipps (the son of the shoemaker Margaret Carnegie did home work for), Anthony Kloman, and Andrew Kloman organized the Iron City Forge in Pittsburgh to take advantage of the booming need for iron products during the American Civil War. Miller subsequently bought out Anton Kloman's share. Phipps and Miller later learned that Andrew Kloman had sold a one-ninth share in the business to a local man who subsequently died during the war, and Miller bought his share (raising his ownership in the business to four-ninths). Kloman, Miller, and Phipps were soon at odds over these transactions and one another's refusal to sell out to the others, and they sought Andrew Carnegie's assistance in resolving the dispute. On September 1, 1863, Carnegie drew up new incorporation papers which made Miller a "special partner" in the firm and which also made Thomas Carnegie a partner in the business. The money for Thomas' investment came from Andrew. A clause in the contract permitted Kloman and Phipps to oust Miller and make him a silent partner, which they quickly did. The same clause, however, gave Thomas Carnegie the right to purchase the extra one-ninth share Miller had obtained, and Andrew Carnegie immediately financed this purchase. When Miller, one of Andrew's closest friends, protested, Andrew induced Thomas to plead with him to acquiesce lest Andrew's reputation as a fair dealer suffer. Miller did so.

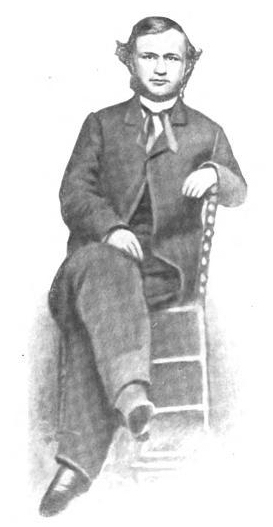
Thomas Carnegie at age 19.

Meanwhile, Miller established a rival firm, the Cyclops Iron Company, with Andrew Carnegie as an investor. The Cyclops firm opened in October 1864. Thomas, however, was deeply concerned that the Cyclops company would harm his own interests in Iron City Forge, and successfully prevailed on Andrew to merge the two firms. (It may also be true that Andrew always intended to merge the two firms in order to gain control of both, and used Thomas for this purpose.) Kloman and Phipps at first refused, but Thomas made an offer of all the shares in Cyclops plus an additional payment of $50,000 (a very large sum at the time). On May 1, 1865, the new Union Iron Mills Company was formed. Thomas was to "help out" as needed, and appointed vice president of the firm.

While Andrew and Miller spent the better part of the next year touring Europe, Thomas flourished at the Union Iron Mills. The company struggled financially as the end of the Civil War led to sharp drops in the need for iron products, but Thomas proved to be a warm and friendly executive where his brother was cold and austere. Thomas' ability to make friends allowed the firm to receive numerous contracts and even infusions of capital when needed, and it is unlikely the company would have survived without him. Andrew wrote to Thomas extensively from Europe, constantly criticizing his business decisions, providing him with micromanaging instructions, and generally demeaning him. From Europe, Andrew also badgered Thomas to make improvements to their home in America, and decided to call the rapidly expanding mansion "Fairfield." Thomas' judgement proved to be more prescient than Andrew's when, in July 1865, Andrew became fascinated with the "Dodd process," a new English method of welding steel facing to iron railroad rails and, despite Thomas' misgivings, he purchased the American patent for the process. The process proved unworkable, and although he made additional investments in retooling the mill, the rails produced by the new process were just as brittle and breakable as those formerly manufactured. Thomas advised him to conserve his money, but Andrew purchased yet another steel welding patent to try to fix the process. That, too, failed and soon Carnegie's steel-welding business was bankrupt. Thomas correctly foresaw that Andrew too easily believed his judgment was infallible, and soon a coal mining process Andrew had purchased also led to significant financial losses.

Meanwhile, Thomas began courting Lucy Coleman, daughter of Pittsburgh iron manufacturing magnate William Coleman. Coleman provided Thomas with critical advice on how to improve the Union Iron Mills, and inside information on the coming railroad building boom. Another critical business relationship was with Piper & Shiffler (later known as the Keystone Bridge Company), an iron bridge building firm invested in by Andrew in 1862. Andrew diverted much of Piper & Shiffler's contracts to the Union Iron Mills, further bolstering the company's profits. Thomas often tried to rein in some of his brother's excesses, but to no avail. For example, in 1866 Andrew proposed purchasing a pipe works adjacent to the old Cyclops Iron Works. Thomas opposed the purchase, arguing that the time for expansion was not ripe and that the pipe works used a kind of iron which the Union Iron Mills did not produce. The pipe works turned out to be a white elephant, but they burned down shortly thereafter (saving the firm from further losses).

=== The Lucy Furnace and Thomson Works ===
Thomas Carnegie played a critical role in the expansion of the Carnegie Bros. & Co. company into the production of pig iron. Iron ore was usually smelted into pig iron first, a brittle but refined product (often cast in ingots) which was usually sold to other companies and turned into wrought iron or steel. Several investors in the Union Iron Mills wished to invest in companies producing pig iron, but William Coleman advised against it and advocated building a wholly owned modern furnace under the company's control. A division of the Union Iron Mills (named the Isabella Furnace Company) was organized on December 1, 1870, and the company's first blast furnace (named the "Lucy Furnace" after Thomas' wife) was constructed on 51st Street in Pittsburgh. Most of the investors who joined the Isabella Furnace Company were Thomas' friends, not Andrew's. Thomas Carnegie supervised the operation of the Lucy furnace, and he was almost alone in contributing to its business success. The Lucy furnace was enormous—75 feet (23 m) high with a 20-foot (6.1 m) bosh (the widest part of the furnace and the hottest due to its proximity to the hearth)—and was producing a record-shattering 300 short tons (270 t) a day by 1872. A second Lucy furnace was built in 1877. In 1881, a two-thirds share in the company was sold to Wilson, Walker & Co. and James R. Wilson relieved Thomas Carnegie and John Phipps of their duties overseeing the operation of the furnaces.

Thomas Carnegie's experience in running the Lucy furnaces led him to co-found the Edgar Thomson Steel Works. In early 1871, William Coleman became interested in the new Bessemer process steel-making furnaces, and he traveled throughout Ohio, New York, and Pennsylvania to view these new works. Coleman invited Thomas Carnegie to join him in building the new steel works, and together they purchased 107 acres (43 ha) of land about 10 miles (16 km) east of Pittsburgh known as Braddock's Field (a historic battlefield where French and Indian forces from Fort Duquesne defeated British General Edward Braddock on July 5, 1755, in the Battle of the Monongahela). (Thomas borrowed the money for his investment from his brother.) Coleman and Carnegie lived near one another in Homewood and went to work together on the streetcar, and it was during these daily commutes that the men worked on their plans for the new steel works. Although Thomas asked Andrew to invest in the new mill, Andrew refused (considering it too risky a venture). Thomas then prevailed upon David McCandless, a wealthy Pittsburgh merchant and vice president of the Exchange National Bank. McCandless agreed, and brought in William P. Shinn (who would, 11 years later, be awarded the Norman Medal, the top award for civil engineering, in 1883) as treasurer. In the spring of 1872, Andrew Carnegie (while on a bond-selling trip) made a survey of Bessemer steel works in Europe and returned to the U.S. highly enthusiastic about the new project. Andrew subsequently invested $250,000 in the works. Meanwhile, Coleman, McCandless, Scott, and Thomas Carnegie had purchased a newly platted tract in Pittsburgh, subdivided it, and sold the lots at a significant profit. The partners then invested $50,000 each in the steel mill. A new company, Carnegie, McCandless & Co., was formed on January 13, 1873, to build the works.

Thomas was on vacation with Andrew and their mother at the upscale resort town of Cresson Springs in September 1873 when they learned of the failure of the investment bank of Jay Cooke & Company, which precipitated the Panic of 1873. The Panic created financial difficulties for the company, and it floated bonds to stay alive. J. Edgar Thomson, president of the Pennsylvania Railroad and a mentor and close friend to many of the partners, bought many of these bonds in late 1873, helping keep the firm afloat. The partners dissolved Carnegie, McCandless & Co. to take advantage of a new Pennsylvania law permitting the formation of limited liability companies, and the Edgar Thomson Steel Company Ltd. was created on October 12, 1874. The company took its name from J. Edgar Thomson, who although not a large investor in the works had a superb reputation as an honest and trustworthy person (an important asset in risky financial times).

Over the next several years, Thomas Carnegie generally oversaw the Edgar Thomson Steel Company. His success in this endeavor was summed up by a corporate historian this way:

Mr. T.M. Carnegie's abilities were too numerous and complex to be summed up in a sentence. He was a man of sterling integrity; and it was a common saying in Pittsburg that his word was better than some men's bond. He had remarkable judgment; and his opinion on commercial questions was valued above that of much older and more experienced men. Quick and keen in his perceptions, cautious but progressive in his ideas, faithful to his engagements, and just in all his dealings, he gave to his company that which corporations are habitually lacking, namely, a conscience.

Other historical assessments conclude Thomas had a solid grasp of the steel business and was a respected manager, even if Andrew considered him overly cautious. William Abbott, chairman of Carnegie, Phipps, & Co., considered Thomas the better businessman than Andrew, "solid, shrewd, farseeing, absolutely honest and dependable." Thomas lacked Andrew's ambition, but "was content with a good, prosperous, safe business and cared nothing for expansion. He disapproved of Andrew's skyrocketing tendencies, regarded him as a plunger and a dangerous leader. Tom wanted earnings in the shape of dividends, whereas Andrew insisted on using them for expansion." Although he shied away from publicity, he was a hard worker and well liked by both management and workers. His one flaw was his drinking: He often left work at noon and drank heavily for the rest of the day.

Crony capitalism was an important part of American industrialism during this period. Thomas Carnegie, however, was not very adept at it. There is conflicting evidence as to whether he mixed widely in Pittsburgh society, with at least one scholar claiming he did and another that he did not. He was reserved at social gatherings, using his attendance at parties to pick up business gossip and industry buzz. He played cards on a weekly basis with Henry Clay Frick, Philander Knox, Andrew and Richard Mellon, and George Westinghouse. His closest friend was David A. Stewart, a co-partner in the Thomson works, and Stewart readily defended Thomas against the criticisms and jibes of others (particularly Andrew Carnegie).

Thomas sold half his interest in Edgar Thomson Steel to his older brother in 1876 after disagreement broke out over whether to build another "Lucy furnace." Thomas Carnegie, however, held no position on the Thomson board of directors, a situation Andrew Carnegie wanted rectified the moment a position on the board became available. This occurred in the summer of 1876, but William P. Shinn (the second-largest stockholder in the company) complained bitterly to Andrew (traveling in Europe) that the seat should have gone to him. Nonetheless, Thomas was not only added to the board but made chairman upon Andrew Carnegie's return to the U.S. a few months later. Shinn eventually had enough, and resigned as manager of the Thomson steel works in September 1879. Thomas replaced Shinn as manager.

Andrew Carnegie decided to stop relying solely on his company's own furnaces for coke, and began seeking to buy the fuel on the open market. Thomas and Henry Phipps had alerted Andrew to the need for a greater and steadier supply for coke for the growing steel works. In 1881, Andrew sent Thomas to meet with Henry Clay Frick, owner of H.C. Frick & Co.—the largest coke producing company in the U.S. Thomas' goal was to induce Frick to buy the Carnegie coke ovens. In November 1881, Thomas proposed selling the Monastery Coke Works near Latrobe, Pennsylvania, to Frick, or at least have Frick take over the marketing and selling of the coke produced there. Thomas' offer came as Frick was planning his wedding, and it fell to Andrew to meet with Frick and his new bride as they honeymooned in New York City. By this time, Thomas had negotiated most of an agreement with Frick, as well as planned the meeting with Andrew. Carnegie took a 10 percent interest in H.C. Frick & Co., Frick took a 50 percent interest in the Monastery coke works, and H.C. Frick & Co. would become the exclusive supplier of coke to Carnegie Bros. & Co. and the Edgar Thomson Steel Works. Thomas was assigned to negotiate the price of coke on an annual basis with Frick, and over the next two years H.C. Frick & Co. made a 23 percent profit on the coke sold. By 1885, Andrew Carnegie had purchased enough stock in H.C. Frick & Co. to own 50 percent of the company. Frick now attempted to buy into the Carnegie steel companies by selling 12 of the remaining 16 percent of the H.C. Frick which he still owned, but Thomas warned him not to try and to instead seek a position as a manager within the company.

Thomas also played a key role in the consolidation of Andrew's businesses. Thomas had become more involved with the management of Edgar Thomson Steel and less with the Isabella Furnace and Union Iron companies. It was Thomas who suggested to Andrew that the companies be consolidated into a single firm, and that Thomas' stake in the new firm be raised commensurate with his managerial role. His older brother agreed. On April 1, 1888, Andrew Carnegie reorganized his iron and steel businesses into one company, Carnegie Bros. & Co., with Thomas holding 17 percent of the stock. Included in the reorganization were the Lucy and Isabella furnaces, Union Iron Mills, and Homestead works.

=== Dungeness ===
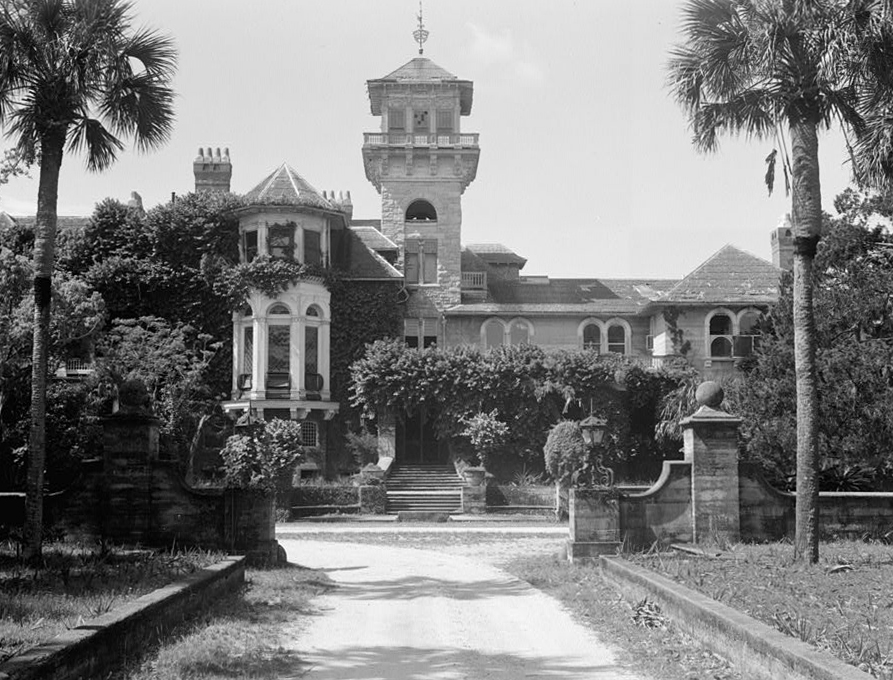
Dungeness in 1958, prior to the fire

In 1880, with seven children at Fairfield and the city of Pittsburgh becoming increasingly hazardous to health due to its burgeoning industry, Thomas and Lucy began seeking a winter home along the southern East Coast for their family. The previous year, the Carnegies had met reporter Frederick Ober while on vacation in Fernandina Beach, Florida. Ober told them about an island plantation he was writing an article about. In 1880, Lippincott's Monthly Magazine published an article by Ober about Dungeness, a plantation on the barrier island of Cumberland Island on the southern Atlantic coast of the state of Georgia. Although it had suffered an extensive fire in 1866 and was uninhabitable, the mansion had a storied past. The article drew the attention of Lucy Carnegie (who had attended boarding school as a girl in nearby Fernandina), and the Carnegies decided the place would be an ideal winter home. The mansion's owner was ex-Confederate General William George MacKay Davis, a first cousin of Confederate President Jefferson Davis who bought the plantation from its creditors in 1879. Carnegie offered to buy Dungeness on August 25, 1880, for $25,000 but his offer was rejected. But after the death of Gen. Davis' son and grandson at the property, Davis desired to leave the place which had brought him such grief and Carnegie offered and Davis accepted a price of $35,000. The sale for the 4,000-acre (1,600 ha) property (which included orange and olive groves, gardens, several cottages, and outbuildings) was final on November 17, 1881.

Over the next four months, the burned-out mansion was demolished and noted Pittsburgh architect Andrew Peebles designed a massive Queen Anne Style mansion with wraparound verandas, high ceilings, several porches, many turrets, and a 100-foot (30 m) high tower. In April 1882, Carnegie and his cousin, Leander Morris, jointly purchased an adjoining 8,240-acre (3,330 ha) property. The cornerstone for the new Dungeness was laid on February 26, 1884, and the $285,000, 6,720-square-foot (624 m^{2}) mansion (fully furnished) completed on January 1, 1885. There was even a landing for Thomas Carnegie's steam-powered yacht, the Missoe. The Carnegies visited Dungeness irregularly over the next year, traveling to Georgia in a private railroad car.

With the purchase of his Cumberland Island estate, Thomas resolved to retire from business and spend more time in Georgia. The stress of working for his brother had left him exhausted.

=== Social life ===
Both Andrew and Thomas Carnegie had been members of the South Fork Fishing and Hunting Club, a highly exclusive wealthy businessman's club which operated a mountaintop retreat overlooking Lake Conemaugh, one of the largest man-made lakes of the day. Lake Conemaugh was formed by the construction of the South Fork Dam in 1853, but had been drained and abandoned prior to its purchase by the South Fork organization. The club, which formed in 1879, restored the South Fork Dam and refilled the reservoir. Andrew and Thomas built a cottage near the clubhouse, and often stayed there. The South Fork Dam failed on May 31, 1889, resulting in the disastrous Johnstown Flood.

== Personal life ==
In June 1866, Carnegie married Lucy Ackerman Coleman (1847–1916), the daughter of Pittsburgh iron manufacturing magnate William Coleman. Their marriage was followed by a honeymoon around Europe. They had been courting since 1864. By 1881, the couple had nine children:

- William Coleman Carnegie (1867–1944), a sportsman and traveler.
  - Married twice, no issue
- Frank Morrison Carnegie (1868–1917)
  - Never married, no issue
- Andrew Carnegie II (1870–1947), who married Bertha Sherlock (1863–1943).
  - They had three children including Nancy Carnegie Rockefeller who married James Stillman Rockefeller
- Margaret Coleman Carnegie (1872–1927), who married Oliver Garrison Ricketson (1864–1943).
- Thomas Morrison Carnegie Jr. (1874–1944), who married Virginia Beggs (1878–1952)
- George Lauder Carnegie (1876–1921), who married Margaret Copley Thaw (1877–1942), the daughter of William Thaw and Mary Sibbet Copley.
  - No issue
- Florence Nightingale Carnegie (1879–1962), who married Frederick Curtis Perkins (1870–1935).
- Coleman Carnegie (1880–1911), who died of pneumonia at age 31.
  - Never married, no issue
- Nancy Trovillo Carnegie (1881–1954), who married Thomas' coachman, George Hever.

The children were tutored at home, although they also attended a private school for a portion of the day. In 1867, Andrew moved to New York City, giving "Fairfield" to Thomas, Lucy, and his mother Margaret. Margaret moved to New York City to live with her older son in 1870.

=== Death ===
In late September 1886, Thomas Carnegie fell ill with what he believed to be a cold. He was sick off and on for the next several weeks. On October 16, he left work thinking he was suffering from yet another cold, but died of pneumonia just three days later. His wife and all of his children except Margaret (who was attending a boarding school in New York) were at his bedside when he died. For most of his life, Thomas had been a member of the Swedenborgian Church. His funeral, however, was conducted by an Episcopalian, and Carnegie was buried on October 21, 1886, in Allegheny Cemetery in Pittsburgh. His mother, also quite ill for some time, died on November 10 (never learning of her younger son's death).

Thomas' death was a serious blow to Andrew Carnegie's financial interests. Thomas had run most of Andrew's enterprises, and to fill his role Andrew Carnegie turned to Henry Clay Frick as his replacement. Frick later played a critical role in the Homestead Strike and in brokering the deal between Carnegie and J. P. Morgan that created U.S. Steel.

Some time before Lucy Coleman Carnegie died in January 1916, Thomas Carnegie's body was disinterred and reburied at the Carnegie family cemetery on Cumberland Island. Although the cemetery is still maintained by the Carnegie family, it is located on land which is now part of the Cumberland Island National Seashore.

=== Estate ===
Thomas' will named Lucy his sole executrix and legatee. The will asked (but did not require) her to seek the advice of her brother-in-law Andrew and her father (who had already died eight years earlier, in 1878) in disposing of Thomas' business interests. Although Andrew advised her to sell out to him, she refused and retained ownership in businesses which led to rapid rises in her personal wealth over the next several decades.

== Print sources ==
- "Andrew Carnegie." In Encyclopedia Americana. New York: Americana Corp., 1966.
- Barefoot, Patricia. Cumberland Island. Charleston, S.C.: Arcadia, 2004.
- Boardman, Jr., Fon W. America and the Robber Barons, 1865 to 1913. New York: Walck, 1979.
- Bostaph, Samuel (2017). Andrew Carnegie: An Economic Biography. Lanham, Md.: Rowman & Littlefield. ISBN 9781538100400.
- Bridge, James Howard. The Inside History of the Carnegie Steel Company: A Romance of Millions. New York: The Aldine Book Company, 1903.
- Bullard, Mary Ricketson. Cumberland Island: A History. Athens, Ga.: University of Georgia Press, 2005.
- Burlingame, Dwight F. The Responsibilities of Wealth. Bloomington, Ind.: Indiana University Press, 1992.
- Carnegie, Andrew. The Gospel of Wealth, and Other Timely Essays. Cambridge, Mass.: Belknap Press of Harvard University Press, 1962.
- "Carnegie, Andrew." In Appletons' Cyclopaedia of American Biography. Rev. ed. James Grant Wilson and John Fiske, eds. New York: D. Appleton & Company, 1887.
- Derbyshire, Wyn. Six Tycoons: The Lives of John Jacob Astor, Cornelius Vanderbilt, Andrew Carnegie, John D. Rockefeller, Henry Ford and Joseph P. Kennedy. London: Spiramus Press, 2008.
- Dilsaver, Lary M. Cumberland Island National Seashore: A History of Conservation Conflict. Charlottesville, Va.: University of Virginia Press, 2004.
- "Mrs. Carnegie Dead." New York Times. November 11, 1886.
- Nasaw, David. Andrew Carnegie. New York: Penguin Press, 2006.
- "Thomas M. Carnegie's Funeral." New York Times. October 31, 1886.
- Seabrook, Charles. Cumberland Island: Strong Women, Wild Horses. Winston-Salem, N.C.: J.F. Blair, 2004.
- Skrabec, Quentin R. The World's Richest Neighborhood: How Pittsburgh's East Enders Forged American Industry. New York: Algora Publishing, 2010.
- Standiford, Les. Meet You in Hell: Andrew Carnegie, Henry Clay Frick, and the Bitter Partnership That Transformed America. New York: Crown Publishers, 2005.
- Swank, James Moore. History of the Manufacture of Iron in All Ages. Philadelphia: American Iron and Steel Association, 1892.
- Tedlow, Richard S. Giants of Enterprise: Seven Business Innovators and the Empires They Built. New York: HarperBusiness, 2001.
- Warren, Kenneth. Triumphant Capitalism: Henry Clay Frick and the Industrial Transformation of America. Reprint ed. Pittsburgh: University of Pittsburgh Press, 2000.
