= Estill =

Estill may refer to:

== Places ==
- Estill, Kentucky
- Estill, Missouri
- Estill, South Carolina
  - Federal Correctional Institution, Estill
- Estill County, Kentucky

== Other uses ==
- Estill (surname)
