= Woodbine Historic District (Woodbine, Georgia) =

Historic district in Georgia, United States

- U.S. National Register of Historic Places
- U.S. Historic district
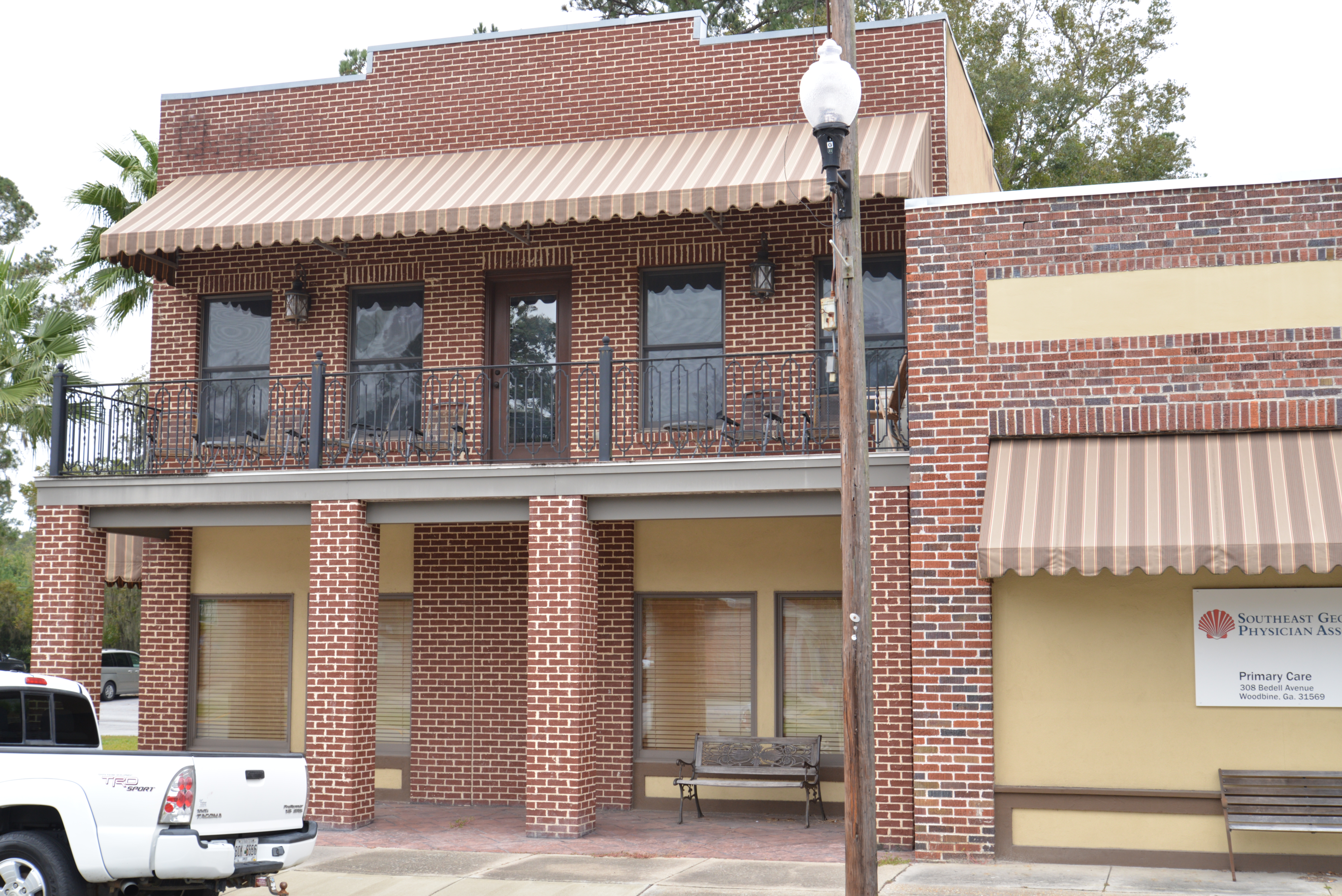
- On Bedell between 3rd and 4th

- Location within Georgia Location within the United States
- Location: Jct. of Bedell Ave. (US 17) and 3rd and 4th Sts., and the central business district Woodbine, Georgia
- Coordinates: 30°58′4″N 81°43′27″W
- Built: 1895
- Architect: Julian de Bruyn Kops
- Architectural style: Gothic, Queen Anne, et al.
- NRHP reference No.: 99000553
- Added to NRHP: May 12, 1999

The Woodbine Historic District in Woodbine, Georgia was listed on the National Register of Historic Places in May 1999.

It includes the 1928-built Camden County Courthouse and the Atkinson Memorial Building (210 East 4th Street). The Atkinson Building was built in 1947 according to the NRHP form, but the plaque on the building says that it was built in 1944. The courthouse was designed by architect Julian de Bruyn Kops (1862-1942) in Late Gothic Revival style and has "shaped parapets with battlements, drip-mold window crowns, and front portico with castellations". The Atkinson Building is the only International Style structure within the district.

Woodbine Historic District

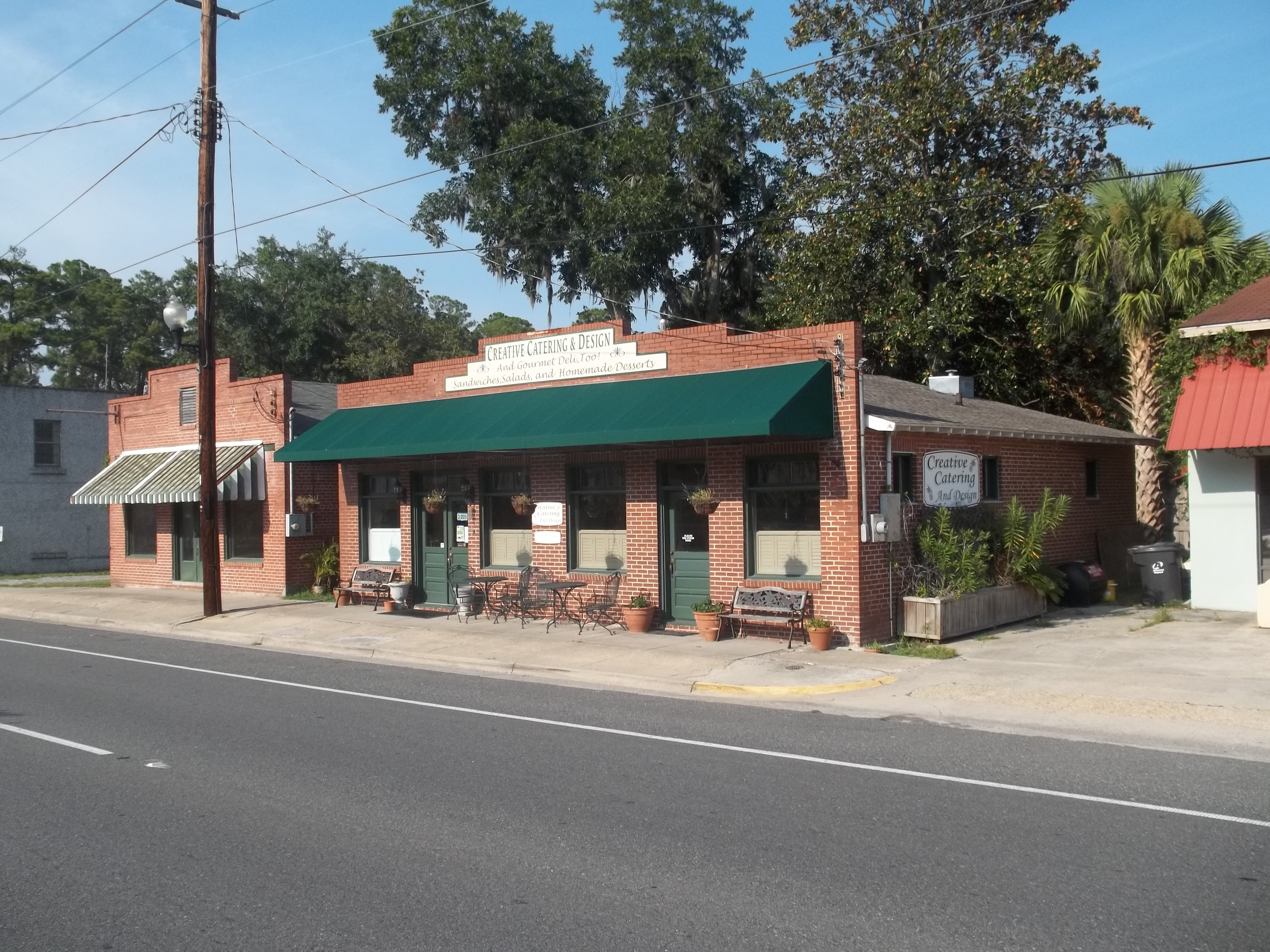
Along US 17

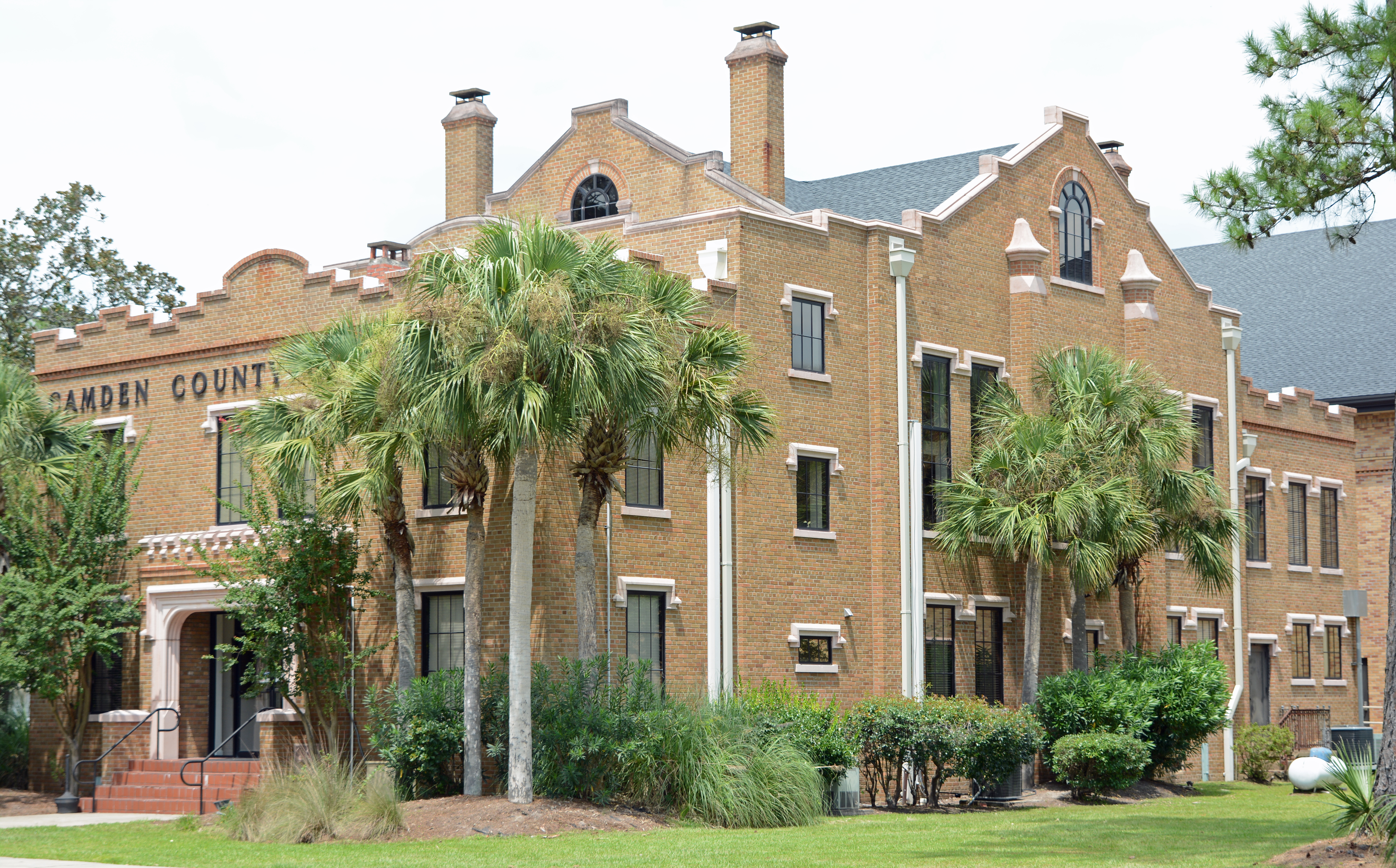
Camden County Courthouse

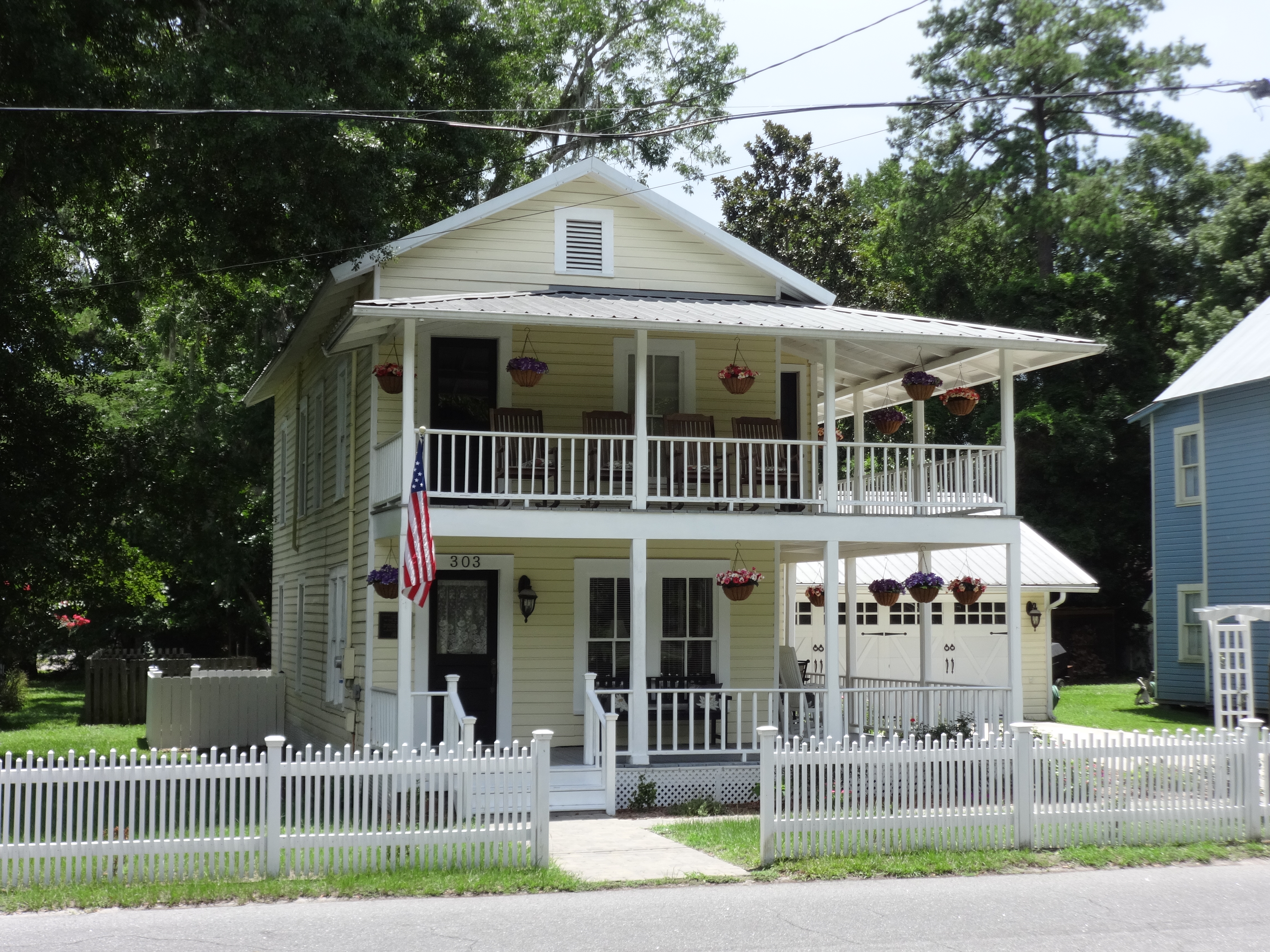
Foster Colson-Foster house

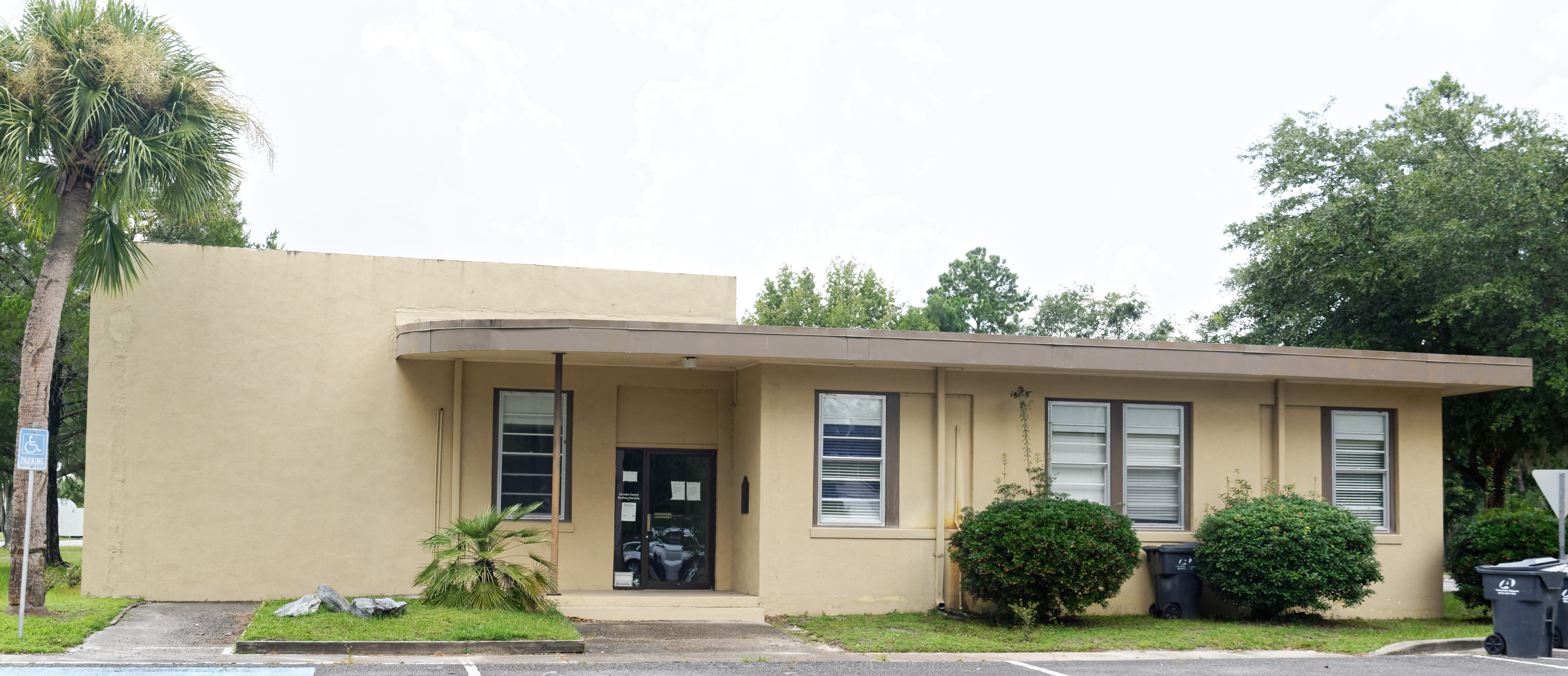
Atkinson Building

== See also ==
- National Register of Historic Places listings in Camden County, Georgia
