= Julian de Bruyn Kops =

American architect

Julian de Bruyn Kops (1862–1942) was an architect in Savannah, Georgia. Several of his works are listed on the National Register of Historic Places.

He was born in Spartanburg, South Carolina. He studied architecture and civil engineering at Lehigh and the University of Georgia. In 1892 he was the Assistant City Engineer in Savannah. By 1905 he was Savannah's superintendent of architecture. He died in Atlanta.

== Work ==
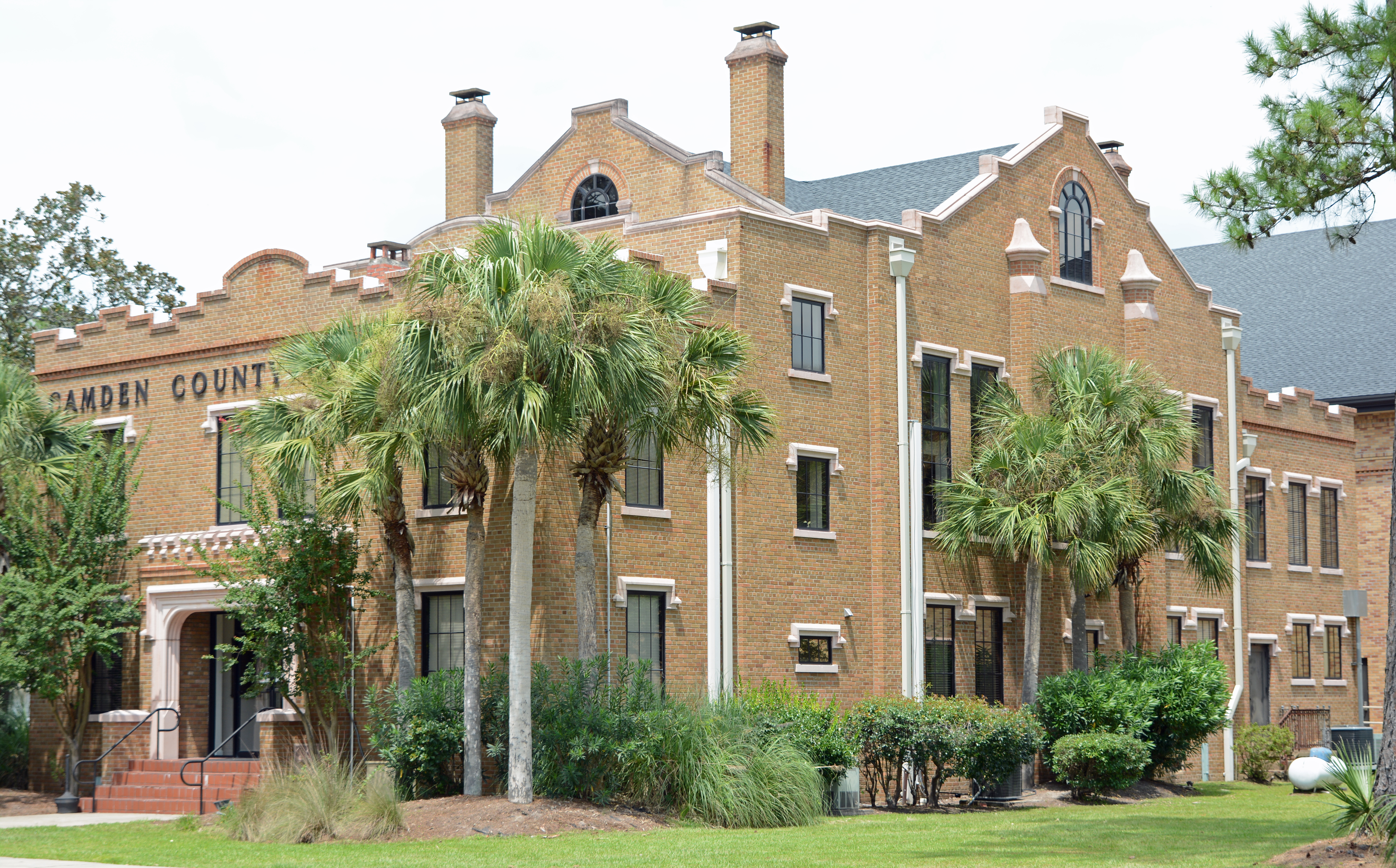
Camden County Courthouse, Georgia

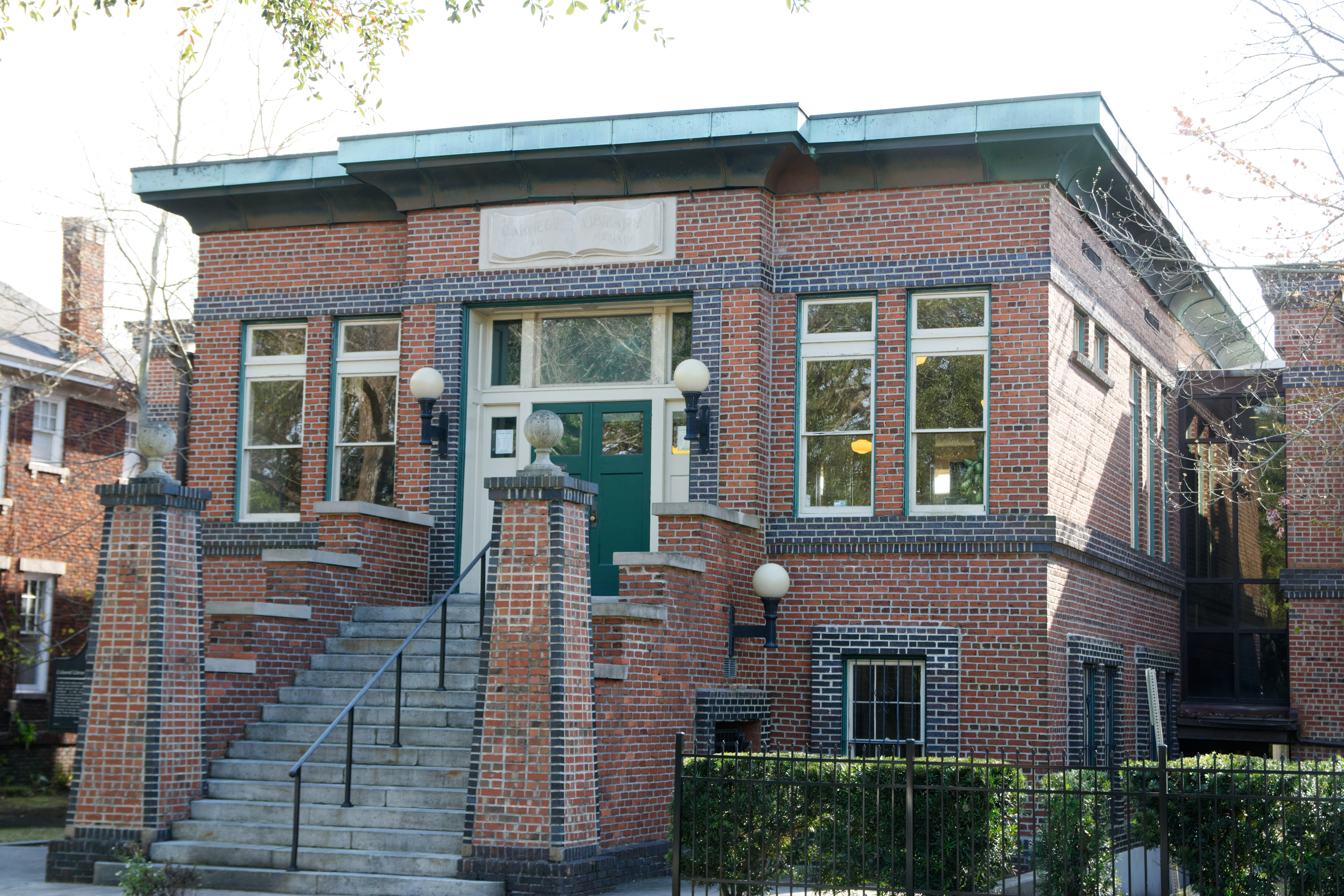
Carnegie Colored Library, Savannah, Georgia

- Oglethorpe Bench (1906)
- Camden County Courthouse (Georgia) (1928) NRHP listed
- Carnegie Colored Library (1915) NRHP listed
- Lawtonville Baptist Church (1911) in Estill, South Carolina NRHP listed
