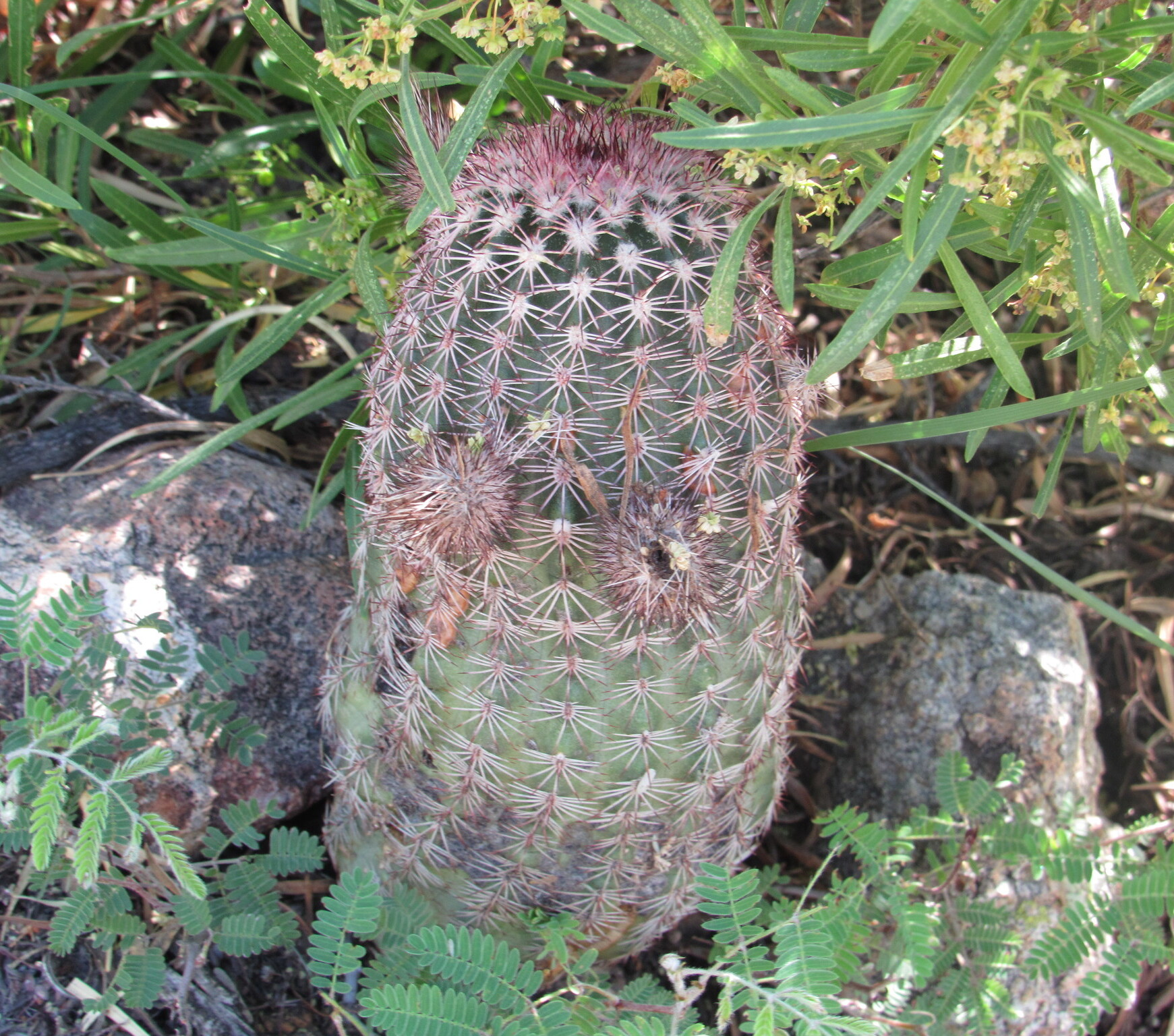

Conservation status
- Least Concern (IUCN 3.1)

Scientific classification
- Kingdom: Plantae
- Clade: Tracheophytes
- Clade: Angiosperms
- Clade: Eudicots
- Order: Caryophyllales
- Family: Cactaceae
- Subfamily: Cactoideae
- Genus: Echinocereus
- Species: E. pseudopectinatus

Binomial name
- Echinocereus pseudopectinatus (N.P.Taylor) N.P.Taylor 1989

Synonyms
- Echinocereus bristolii var. pseudopectinatus N.P.Taylor 1985; Echinocereus scopulorum subsp. pseudopectinatus (N.P.Taylor) W.Blum & Mich.Lange 1998

= Echinocereus pseudopectinatus =

Species of cactus

Echinocereus pseudopectinatus is a species of cactus native to Mexico and the United States.

== Description ==
Echinocereus pseudopectinatus typically grows singly with light green cylindrical shoots up to 20 cm long and 5 cm in diameter, partially hidden by spines. It has 15 to 16 slightly tuberculated ribs. The three to five protruding, whitish central spines, sometimes in two rows, are 0.5 to 1.5 cm long. The twelve to fifteen spreading, whitish radial spines are 0.9 to 1.5 cm long. The funnel-shaped flowers are magenta, appear near the tips of the shoots, and are up to 11 cm long with a diameter of 6 to 9 cm. The spherical fruits are red and thorny.

== Distribution ==
Echinocereus pseudopectinatus is found in a small area in Cochise County, Arizona, USA, and in the neighboring Mexican state of Sonora between 800 and 1500 meters. The plant grows on rocky outcrops in the Chihuahuan Desert growing along with Mammillaria standleyi, Echinocereus rigidissimus and Coryphantha recurvata.

== Taxonomy ==
First described as Echinocereus bristolii var. pseudopectinatus by Nigel Paul Taylor in 1985, the specific epithet "pseudopectinatus" means 'false' and indicates its similarity to Echinocereus pectinatus. Taylor elevated it to an independent species in 1989.
