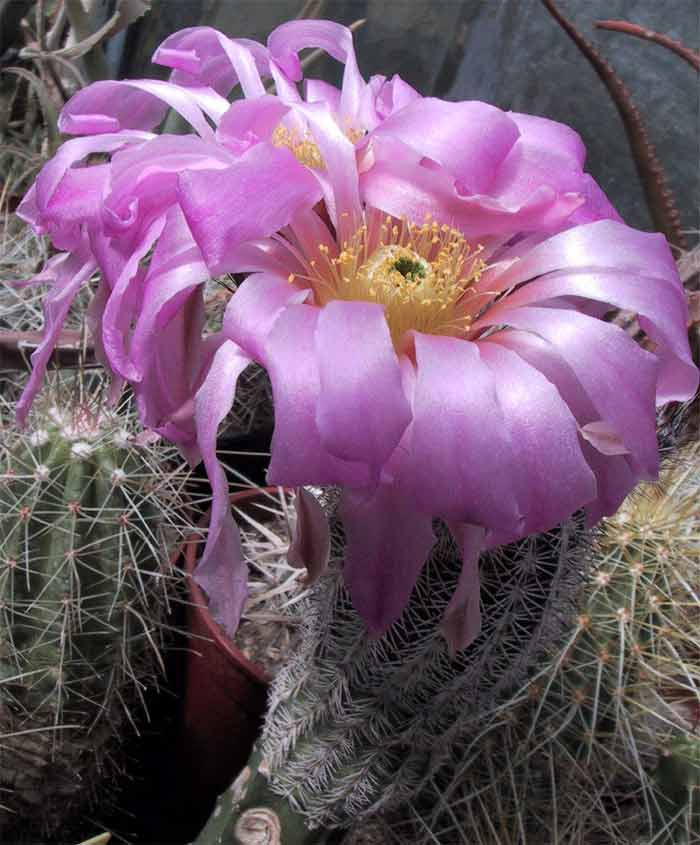

Conservation status
- Least Concern (IUCN 3.1)

Scientific classification
- Kingdom: Plantae
- Clade: Tracheophytes
- Clade: Angiosperms
- Clade: Eudicots
- Order: Caryophyllales
- Family: Cactaceae
- Subfamily: Cactoideae
- Genus: Echinocereus
- Species: E. bristolii

Binomial name
- Echinocereus bristolii W.T.Marshall 1938

Synonyms
- Echinocereus pectinatus var. bristolii (W.T.Marshall) W.T.Marshall 1958

= Echinocereus bristolii =

Species of cactus

Echinocereus bristolii is a species of cactus native to Mexico.

== Description ==
Echinocereus bristolii starts as a single shoot and eventually forms clusters of up to 30 shoots. The light green, cylindrical shoots taper at the tip, growing up to 20 centimeters long and 5 centimeters in diameter. They have 15 to 19 low, sharp ribs that are slightly tuberous. The whitish spines, with darker tips, include three central spines up to 1 centimeter long, with the lower one being the longest, and 22 to 24 radial spines up to 1 centimeter long. The pink, funnel-shaped flowers bloom near the tips of the shoots, measuring 3.8 to 8.5 centimeters in length and 5.5 to 10.5 centimeters in diameter. The nearly spherical fruits split open at the tip.

== Distribution ==
Echinocereus bristolii is found in Soyopa in the Mexican state of Sonora at elevations between 250 and 1350 meters in scrub and semidesert grasslands. The plant is found growing along with Echinocereus rigidissimus.

== Taxonomy ==
It was first described by William Taylor Marshall in 1938. The species name honors American Barkley Bristol, who discovered it.
