= Ella Howard Estill =

American botanical illustrator (1860–1941)

- Born: Ella Robinson Howard; 1860; Columbus, Ohio
- Died: 1941 (aged 80–81); Los Angeles, California
- Other name: Mrs. John Wilmot Estill
- Known for: watercolor paintings
- Spouse: John Wilmot Estill
- Children: 3

Ella Howard Estill (born Ella Robinson Howard, 1860–1941) was an American painter.

== Biography ==
Ella Howard Estill was born Ella Robinson Howard in 1860 in Columbus, Ohio. She married window manufacturer John Wilmot Estill in October 1887, and they had three children: Howard Wilmot, Mary Howard, and Edward Howard. After the birth of Edward, Ella became ill with tuberculosis and moved to Oracle, Arizona for her health. She began painting wildflowers and cacti in the desert. The rest of the family joined her a year later, and John opened a general store. In 1906, the family moved to Tucson. In 1921, Ella and John Estill moved to Los Angeles, where Ella died in 1941.

Her daughter, Mary Howard Cadwell, was one of the first women in the United States to earn a Ph.D. in microbiology, and later became a professor at the University of Arizona.

== Painting ==
Some of Estill's watercolor paintings of cacti were included in the book The Fantastic Clan, The Cactus Family by John James Thornber and Frances Bonker. The University of Arizona Herbarium contains almost 600 of Estill's watercolors in its collection.

== Gallery ==
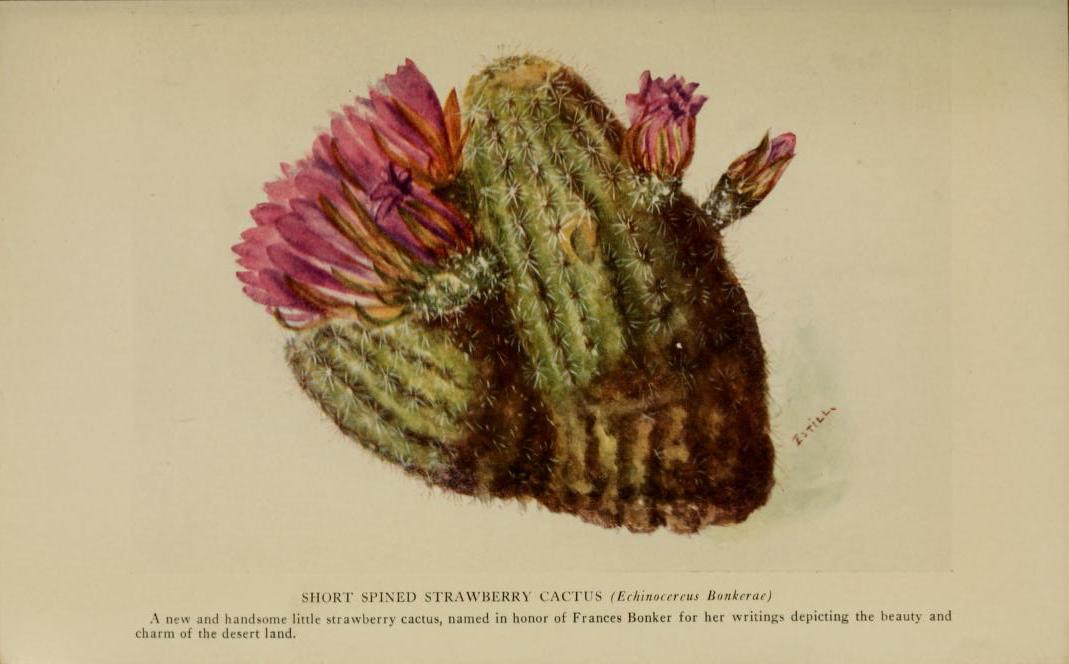
Echinocereus bonkerae

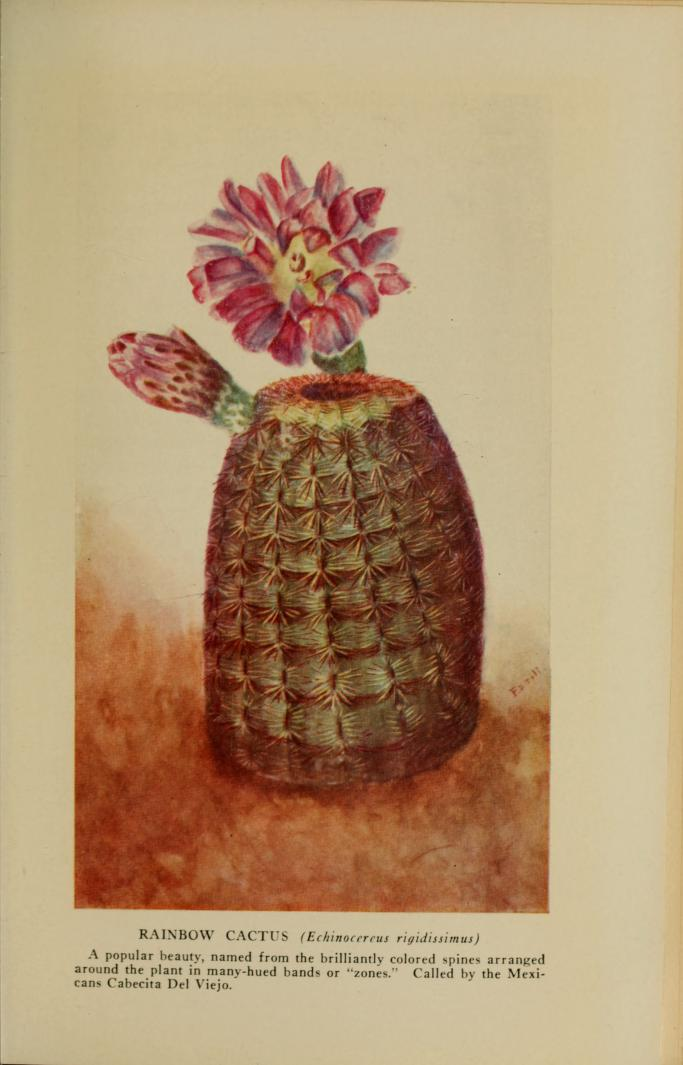
Echinocereus rigidissimus

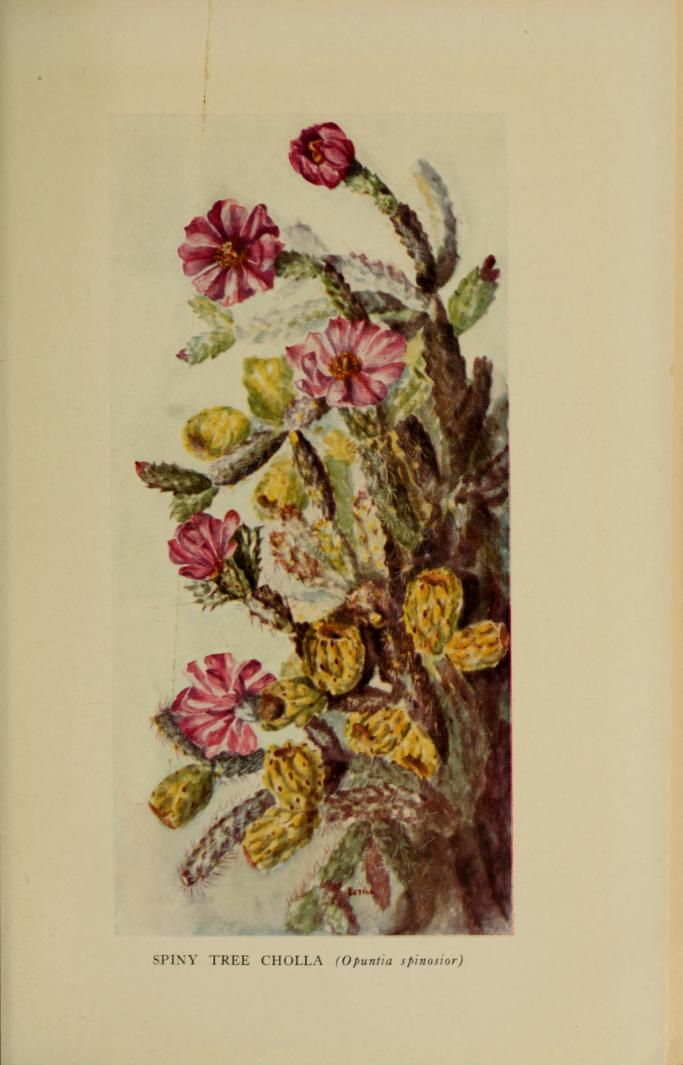
Opuntia spinosior
