= Camden County Courthouse (Georgia) =

Courthouse in Woodbine, Georgia, US

- U.S. National Register of Historic Places
- U.S. Historic district – Contributing property
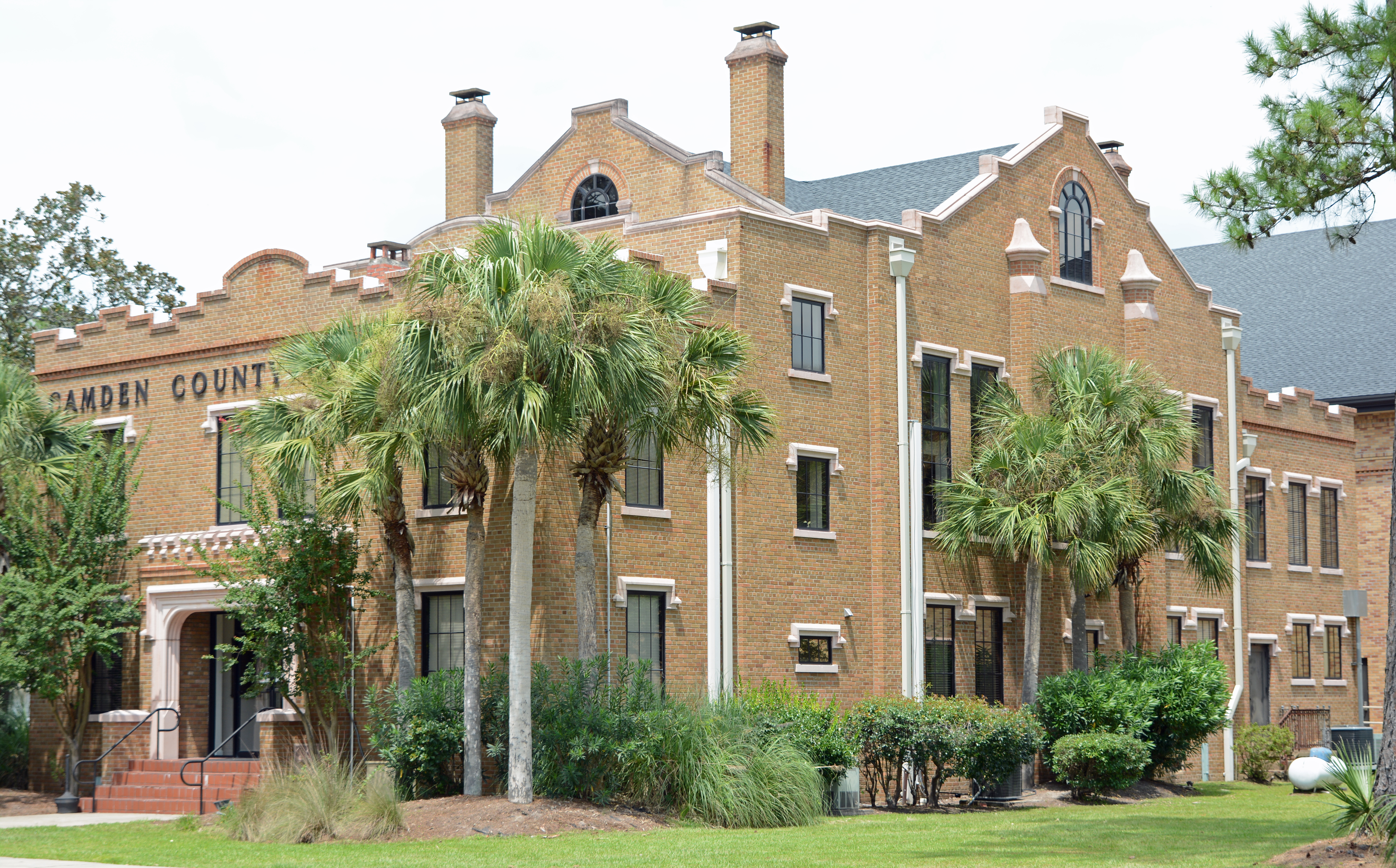

- Location within Georgia Location within the United States
- Location: 4th and Camden Aves., Woodbine, Georgia
- Coordinates: 30°58′5″N 81°43′15″W
- Area: 2 acres (0.81 ha)
- Built: 1928
- Built by: McGowan & Ramsey
- Architect: Kops, J. de Bruyn
- Architectural style: Late Gothic Revival
- Part of: Woodbine Historic District (Woodbine, Georgia) (ID99000553)
- MPS: Georgia County Courthouses TR
- NRHP reference No.: 80000983

Significant dates
- Added to NRHP: September 18, 1980
- Designated CP: May 12, 1999

The Camden County Courthouse (or Old Camden County Courthouse) is a two-story courthouse in the US city of Woodbine, Georgia.

The courthouse was entered into the United States' National Register of Historic Places in 1980; it is a contributing building in the Woodbine Historic District, which was listed on the NRHP in 1999.

The building was designed by Julian de Bruyn Kops (1862–1942). Since its completion in 1928, it has served not only as a courthouse for Georgia's Camden County, but also as a venue for meetings, commerce, and other functions.

It was nominated for the NRHP as Georgia's only 20th-century example of Late Gothic Revival architecture. It sports a brick façade, castellated portico and parapets, and rectangular windows with crown molding.
