= John Lawton House =

Historic house in South Carolina, United States

- U.S. National Register of Historic Places
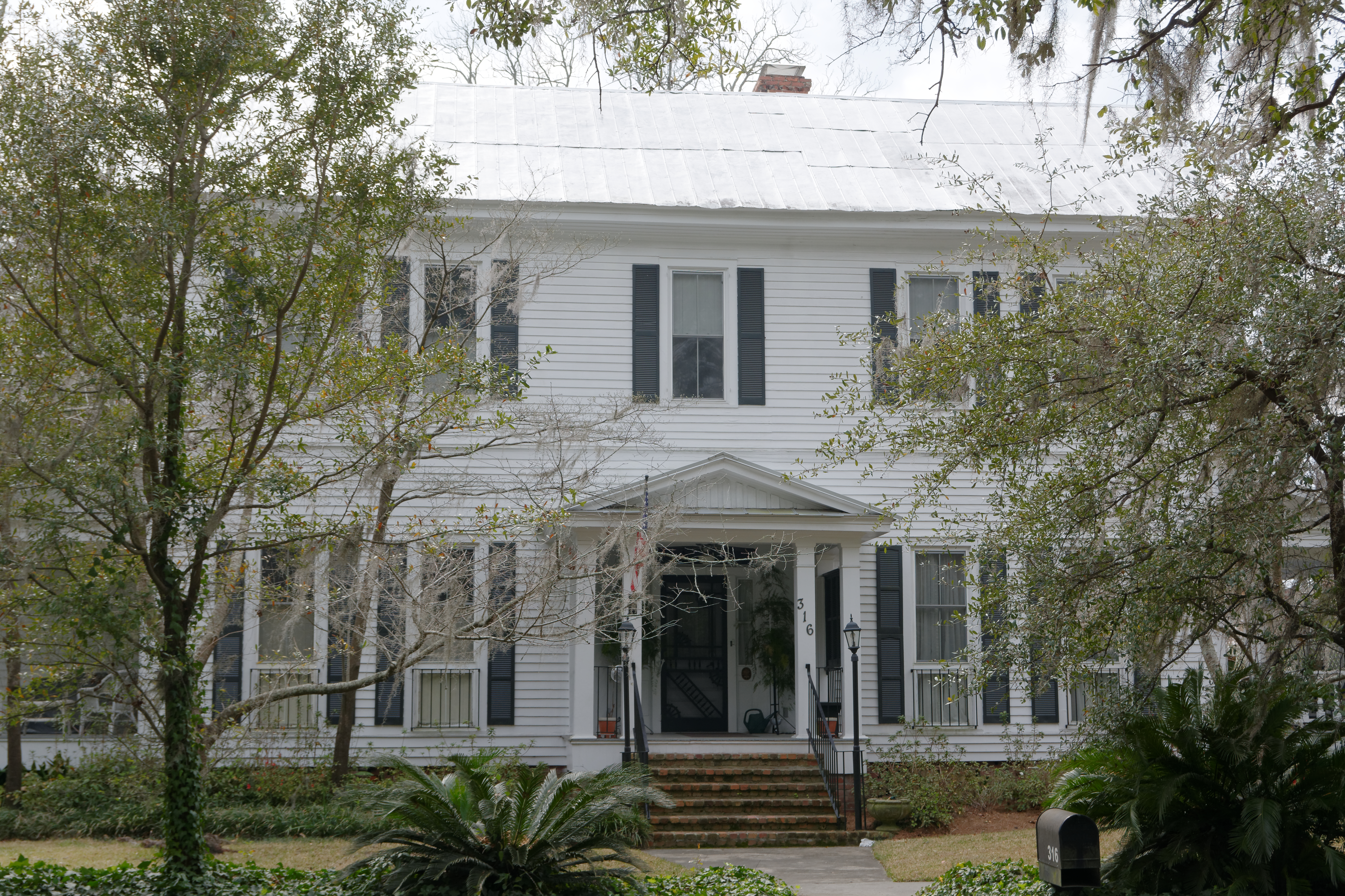

- Location within South Carolina Location within the United States
- Location: 316 3rd. St., Estill, South Carolina
- Coordinates: 32°45′17″N 81°14′30″W
- Area: less than one acre
- Built: 1908
- Built by: Lebey, John C.
- Architectural style: Classical Revival, Colonial Revival
- NRHP reference No.: 09000484
- Added to NRHP: July 1, 2009

John Lawton House is a historic home located at Estill, Hampton County, South Carolina. It was built in 1908, and consists of a two-story, wood frame, side-gabled main block with wings and an asymmetrical rear ell. The front facade features a pedimented porch resting on four square Tuscan order columns. The house was substantially renovated in 1947, changing the exterior style from its original Classical Revival appearance to Colonial Revival.

It was listed on the National Register of Historic Places in 2009.
