= Estil (surname) =

Estil is a surname. Notable people with the surname include:

- Bente Estil (born 1970), Norwegian politician
- Frode Estil (born 1972), Norwegian skier

== See also ==
- Estey (surname)
- Ester (surname)
- Estill (surname)
