= Hilda Grayson Finney =

American educator

- Hilda Grayson (later Finney), from a 1942 newspaper
- Born: Hilda Veronica Grayson; November 29, 1913; Estill, South Carolina, U.S.
- Died: June 1, 1976 (age 62); Los Angeles, California, U.S.
- Occupations: Educator, public historian

Hilda Veronica Grayson Finney (November 29, 1913 – June 1, 1976) was an American educator. She was a field representative for the Association for the Study of Negro Life and History in the 1940s. She was founder and director of the Center for Extended American History, a Los Angeles archive for materials concerning Black History Week.

== Early life and education ==
Grayson was born in Estill, South Carolina, the daughter of Edgar Grayson. She graduated from Morris Brown College in Atlanta.

== Career ==
Grayson was a teacher in Allendale, South Carolina. In 1939, she was forbidden to teach Black history lessons to her students. Later, she succeeded in getting thirteen books on Black history added to the state's approved list for school use. Based on this success, Carter G. Woodson hired her as field representative at the Association for the Study of Negro Life and History in 1942. Her work included traveling through the eastern United States, holding workshops on teaching Black history, advising on historical preservation, and recommending reading and curriculum materials. She was also secretary of the Bethune-Cookman College Fund, and a leader in the Palmetto State Teachers Association. She was a member of Alpha Kappa Alpha.

After she moved to Los Angeles around 1960, she opened her extensive collections as the Center for Extended American History, in her home on Crenshaw Boulevard, to support educators and researchers interested in Black history. She was involved in activities of the Congress of Afrikan People in southern California. In her last years, she taught weekly Black history courses at the men's prison in Chino.

== Personal life ==
Grayson married fellow educator Ernest Adolphus Finney in 1943. At her wedding, she wore a strand of pearls given to her by Mary McLeod Bethune. They had sons Earl and Ronald. Ronald Finney was later known as journalist Yemi Touré. Her stepson Ernest A. Finney Jr. became a judge and state legislator. She died from cancer in 1976, at the age of 62, in Los Angeles.
