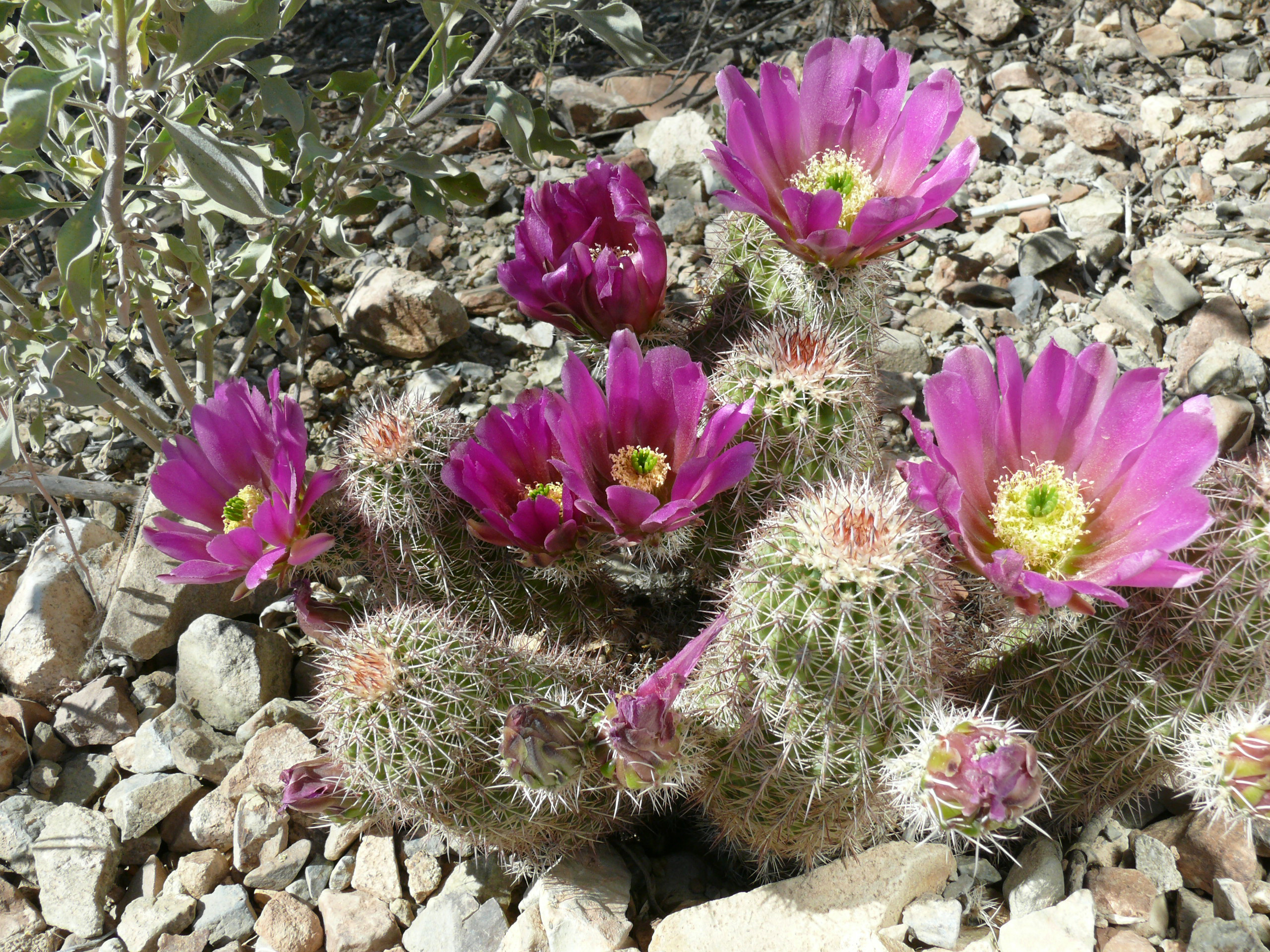

Conservation status
- Least Concern (IUCN 3.1)

Scientific classification
- Kingdom: Plantae
- Clade: Tracheophytes
- Clade: Angiosperms
- Clade: Eudicots
- Order: Caryophyllales
- Family: Cactaceae
- Subfamily: Cactoideae
- Genus: Echinocereus
- Species: E. bonkerae

Binomial name
- Echinocereus bonkerae Thornb. & Bonker, 1932

Synonyms
- Echinocereus fasciculatus var. bonkerae (Thornber & Bonker) L.D.Benson 1969; Echinocereus fasciculatus subsp. bonkerae (Thornber & Bonker) N.P.Taylor 1997; Echinocereus fendleri var. bonkerae (Thornber & Bonker) L.D.Benson 1944

= Echinocereus bonkerae =

Species of cactus

Echinocereus bonkerae, also known as pinkflower hedgehog cactus, Bonker hedgehog, or short spined strawberry cactus, is a species of hedgehog cactus.

== Description ==
Echinocereus bonkerae typically grows in loose groups of 5 to 15 green, cylindrical to elongated shoots 12 to 20 cm (4.7 to 7.9 in) long and 4 to 7.5 cm (1.6 to 3.0 in) in diameter, partially obscured by spines. These shoots have 11 to 16 ribs and a single, strong, upright central spine that is white or light gray with a darker tip, measuring 6 to 7.5 mm (0.24 to 0.30 in) in length. Additionally, there are 11 to 14 spreading, straight, whitish or grayish radial spines that are 1.2 to 2 cm (0.47 to 0.79 in) long.

The flowers of Echinocereus bonkerae are broadly funnel-shaped and range from magenta to reddish-purple. They appear in the upper half of the shoots, measuring 5 to 6.2 cm (2.0 to 2.4 in) in length and diameter. The spherical, fleshy fruits start green and later turn red. The chromosome count is 2n = 22.

== Distribution ==
This species is commonly found in dry grasslands and in chaparral shrublands in the United States in the Pinal and Santa Catalina Mountains of Arizona, and in the neighboring Mexican state of Sonora growing at elevations of 700 - 2000 meters. Plants grow in sandy-loamy soil and rocky slopes in pinyon-juniper woodlands.

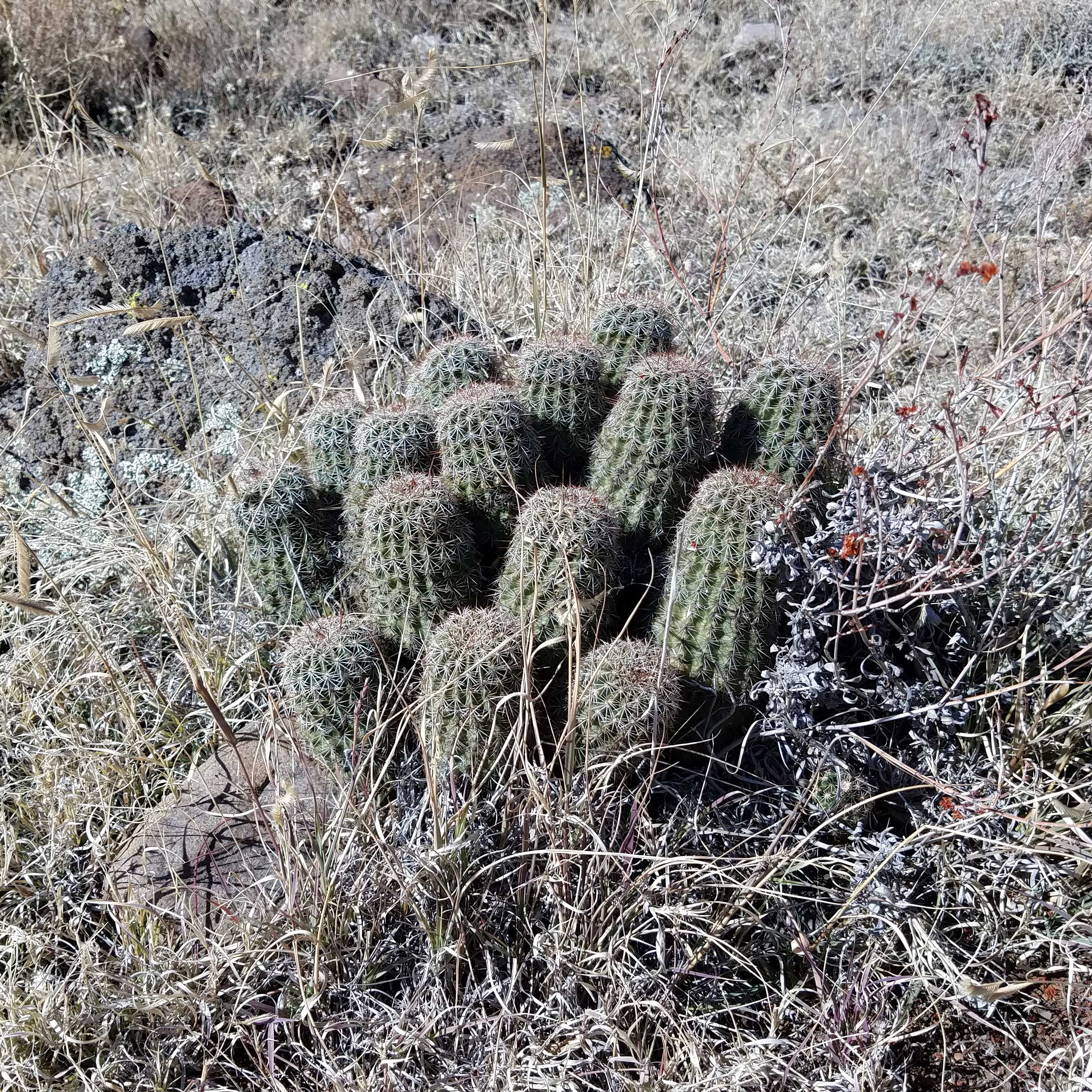
Plant in habitat

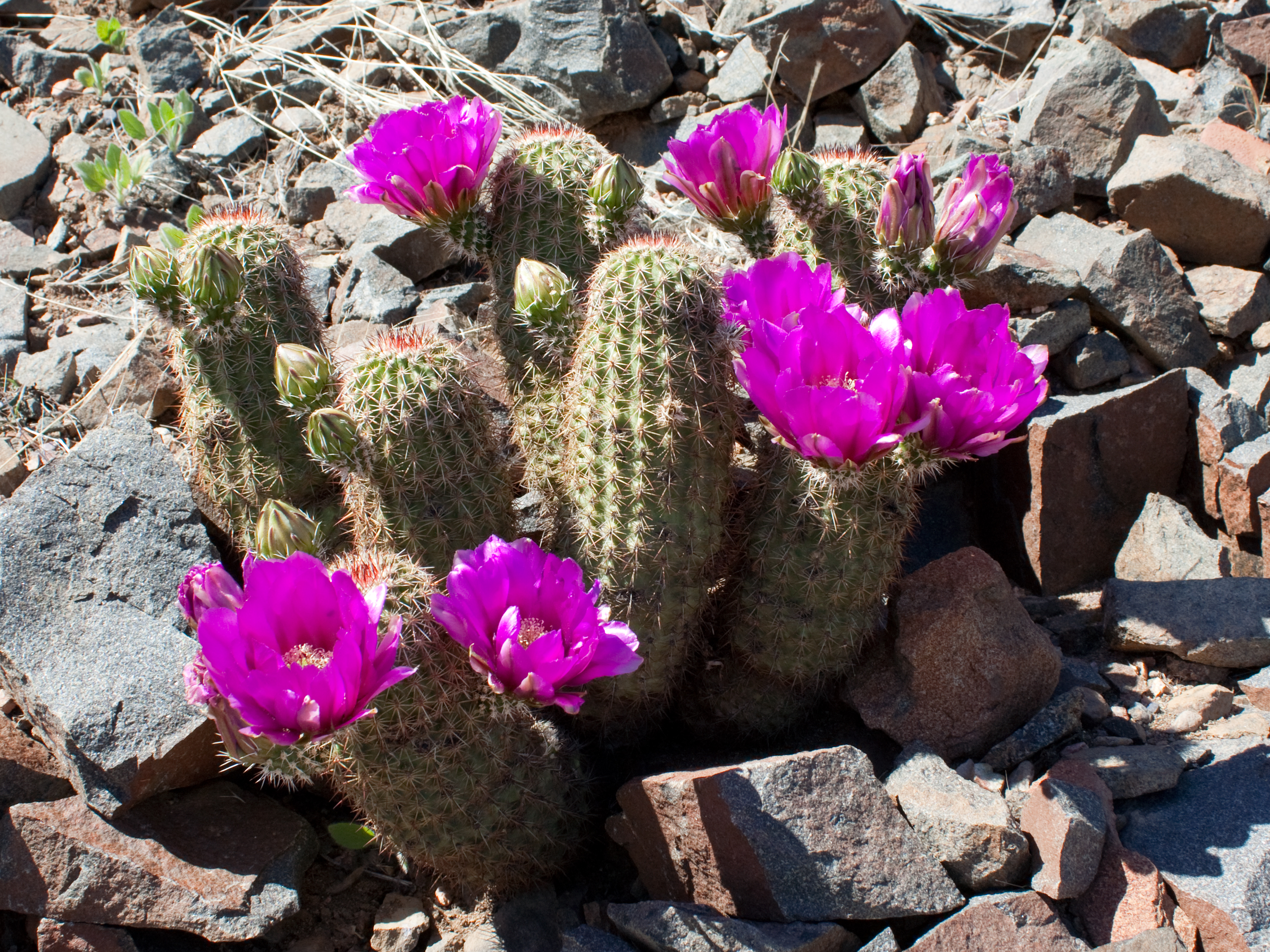
Blooming plant

== Taxonomy ==
Echinocereus bonkerae was first described by John James Thornber and Frances Bonker in 1932. It was named in honor of Frances Bonker from Pasadena.

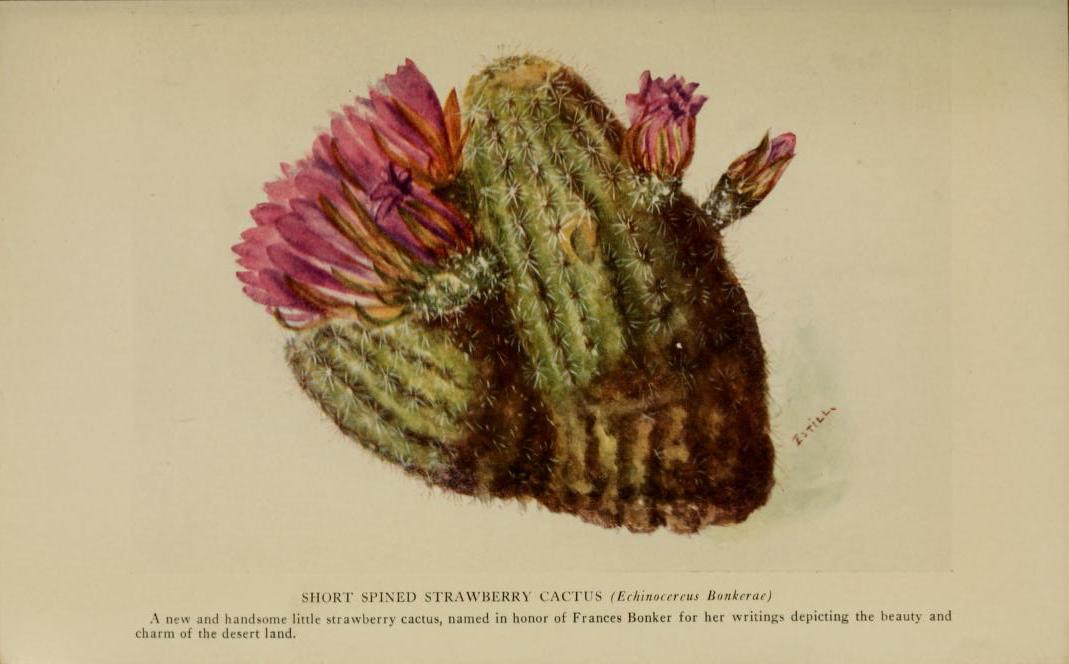
Illustration of Echinocereus bonkerae by Ella Howard Estill from book The Fantastic Clan
