= Estill (surname) =

Estill is a surname. Notable people with the surname include:

- Ella Howard Estill
- Jim Estill (born 1957), Canadian businessman
- Jo Estill (1921–2010), American singer and vocal coach
- Michelle Estill (born 1962), American golfer
- Robert W. Estill (1927–2019), American Anglican bishop

== See also ==
- Estil (surname)
