= East Henry Street Carnegie Library =

Public library in Georgia, United States

Coordinates: 32.061273°N 81.091319°W

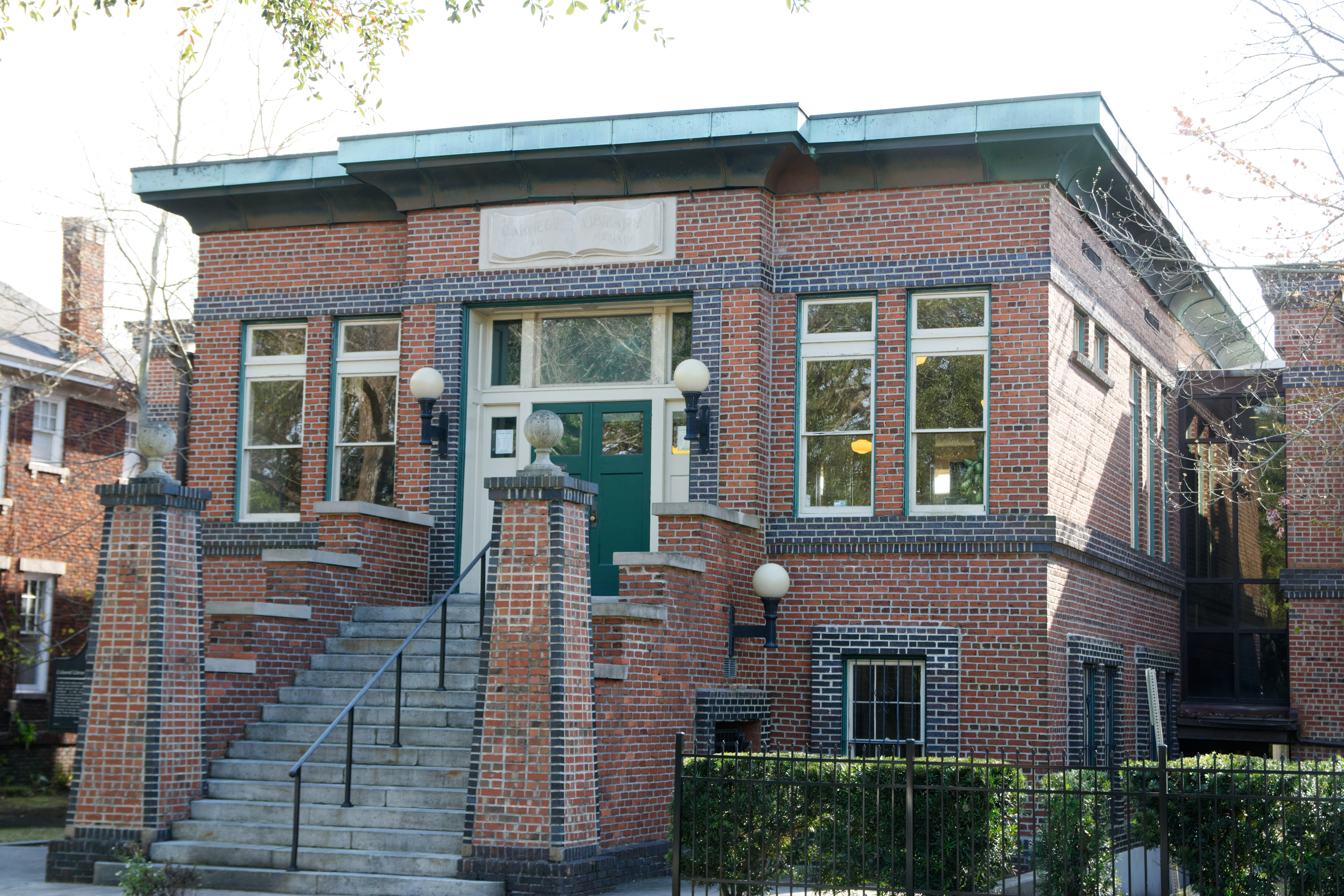
The Carnegie Library of Savannah, known previously as the Carnegie Colored Public Library

East Henry Street Carnegie Library, also known as the Savannah Carnegie Library, and historically as the Carnegie Colored Library, is a public library established for and by African Americans in Savannah, Georgia during the segregation era. The historic building has been preserved and renovated. It is now a branch in Savannah's Live Oak Public Libraries system. The library is an example of Prairie style architecture and is one of only two Carnegie library projects for African-Americans in Georgia. It was the local library for James Alan McPherson, who became the first African American writer to win a Pulitzer Prize and for Clarence Thomas who went on to become a judge on the United States Supreme Court. The building has won honors for its renovation and historical preservation. It is a contributing property of the Savannah Victorian Historic District.

== History ==
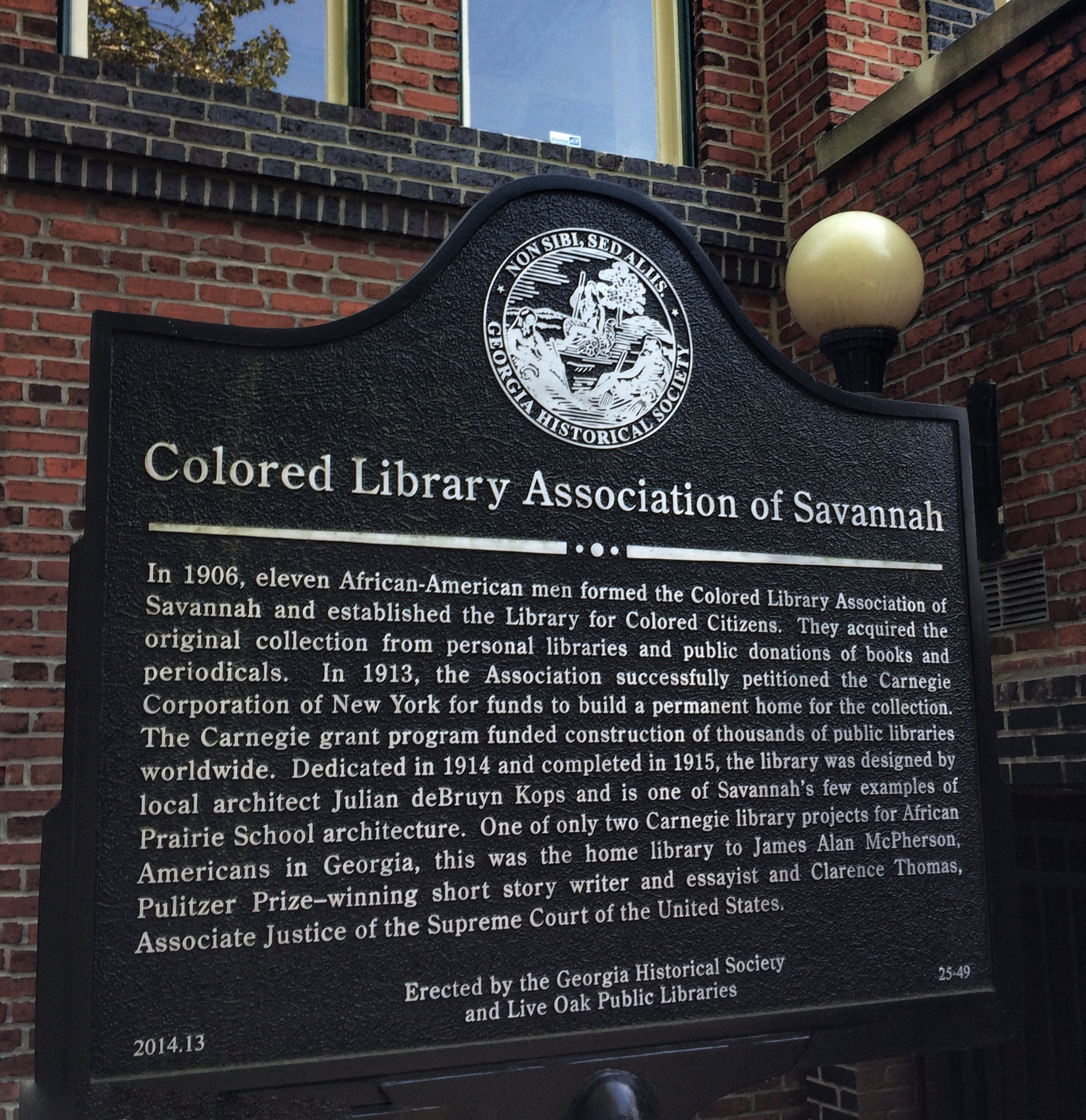

On November 1, 1903, the city of Savannah and the Georgia Historical Society partnered to open a public library on a three-year basis in Hodgson Hall on the north side of Forsyth Park in Savannah. The Black citizens of the Savannah community were prevented from using the new library. This prohibition provided the impetus for the formation of the Colored Library Association of Savannah. (The Georgia Historical Society, 2014) The Colored Library Association of Savannah formed in 1906 and operated the Savannah Colored Public Library out of the basement of Dr. Jamison, one of Savannah's prominent Black dentists of the time. Another prominent member of the association was Richard R. Wright Sr., President of Georgia State Industrial College for Colored Youth (Savannah State University). The Association's twelve founding members included many of Black Savannah's professional, business, and cultural leaders. The Colored Library Association of Savannah relied on contributions of books from their founding members, and money from local supporters to open their own library to the public.

In 1909, Andrew Carnegie offered the city of Savannah $60,000 (later raised to $75,000) for a new main library on Bull Street. (The University of Southern Mississippi) This donation encouraged the Colored Library Association to approach the philanthropist themselves. Carnegie had already shown interest in funding the building of libraries for Black colleges and communities, (Note: The first opened at Tuskegee where Booker T Washington built a network of wealthy American philanthropists who donated to the college he was developing.) which he saw as a contribution to solving the problems of the South. Donations from the Black community and the twelve founding members facilitated the purchase of land for a building on East Henry Street across from Dixon Park; which at that time, was home to a thriving Black middle class. The neighborhood was home to many Black teachers, doctors, lawyers and business owners. Once the land was secured, the Carnegie Foundation awarded the Colored Library Association a sum of $12,000 to build a small library. (The University of Southern Mississippi)

The Carnegie Colored Library opened on August 14, 1914. Its inaugural librarian was Charles A.R. McDowell. Though its opening day collections consisted of only 3,000 volumes, the library immediately became an indispensable community institution among Savannah's African Americans. It provided them with reading materials by Black and White authors, programs to attend, clubs to join, and space for public meetings. While the library received support from the city, it remained supervised by a separate board until 1963, when Savannah desegregated its libraries. The Carnegie Library reopened as an integrated branch of the Savannah Public Library but continued to serve a predominantly African American clientele. (The University of Southern Mississippi)

Julian deBruyn Kops, a local Savannah architect and engineer, was commissioned to design the new library. The building itself is significant not only because of the part it plays in the social history of Black Savannah, but also because of the style of which deBruyn Kops chose for it. It is one of the only examples of Prairie Style architecture within the city.

In 1915 the building was officially completed and came to be known locally as the "Carnegie Colored Public Library" because it was reserved for the African-American community, who were excluded from the other public library in town. In respect and appreciation of the assistance they received from the Carnegie grant, the name of the library was also officially changed when it was moved into Kops' building on East Henry Street. The Carnegie Colored Library which existed after this move helped to foster and support a growing Black community in downtown Savannah through the two world wars and struggles for civil rights. The Carnegie Library became a refuge and educational center for local Black children, some of whom grew up to become local representatives. Justice Clarence Thomas wrote in his memoirs that he frequently used it as a boy, before the library system was desegregated. During a time of social, class, and racial segregation, the Carnegie Colored Library helped to publicize the need for education in segregated areas.

== Architecture ==
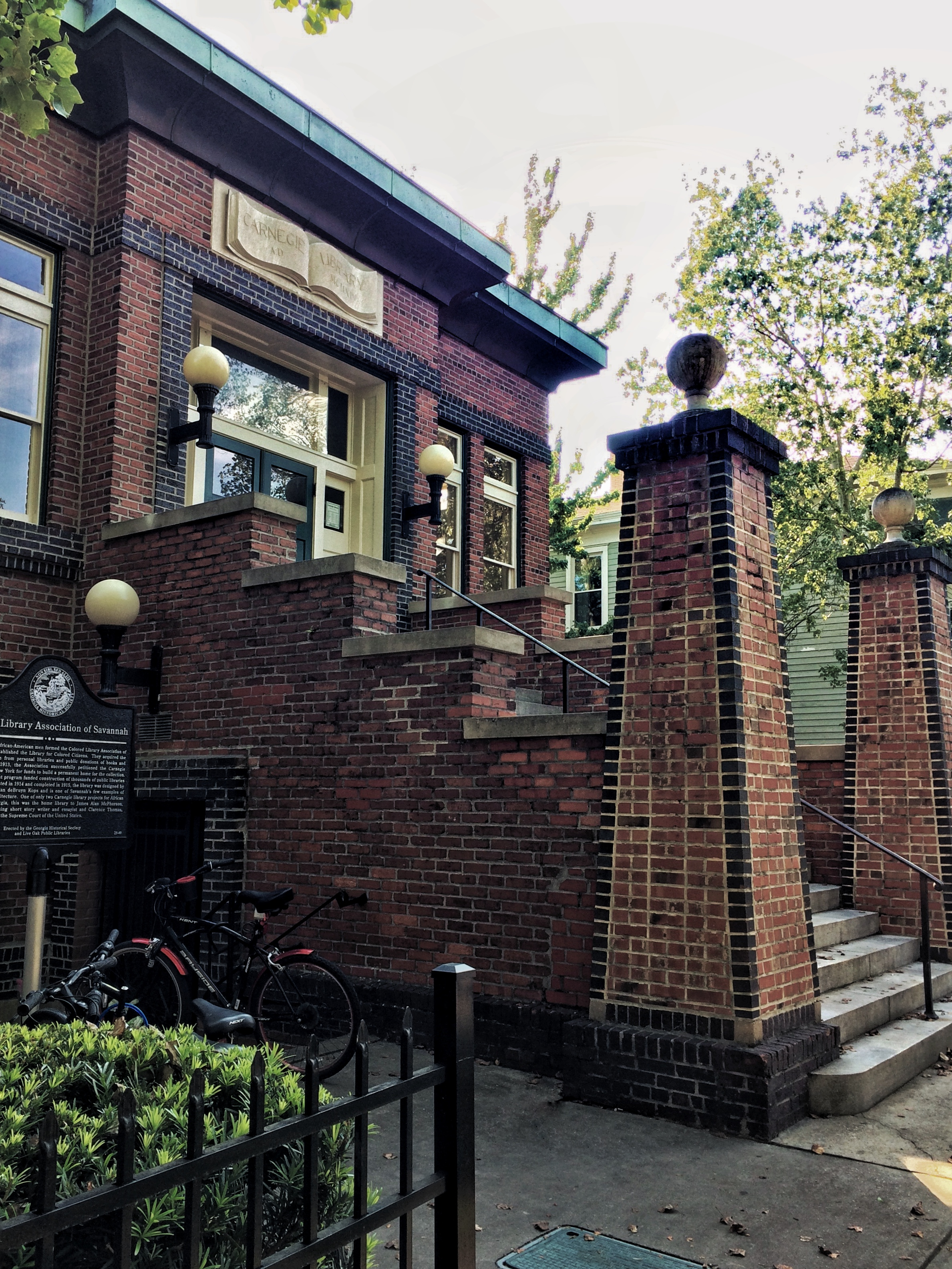

Live Oak Public Libraries, in documents celebrating the centennial anniversary, describe the influence of the Prairie School of architecture noting: "The monumental staircase leading to the main entrance on the second floor is framed by two enormous piers with sandstone orbs on small pedestals. Additionally there are four tiered brick walls with sandstone coping which flank the staircase. The corners of the piers are delineated by dark glazed bricks, a motif repeated in a horizontal band over the second floor windows and projecting brick cornice that visually divides the first and second stories. This emphasis on horizontality achieved through the coping and polychromed brickwork is a key element of the architecture of the Prairie School, pioneered by Frank Lloyd Wright and his contemporaries. The interior continues to show the influence of Wright in the geometric and floral motifs incorporated on columns and pilasters." The flat roof and second-floor staircase, as well as the ornaments on the outside and the inside lend themselves to the Prairie School. And on the whole, the entire building, inside and out reflects a coordinated geometrical approach to architecture that is unlike any other in the city.

== Merger with library system after the end of segregation ==
The Carnegie Colored Library was in operation on its own until the end of segregation when it then joined the larger Savannah Public Library system in 1963. With the end of segregation African‐Americans were able to access the Bull Street Library for the first time. The cultural importance of Carnegie remained, even as the educational necessity waned. At the end of the 20th century, the Carnegie Library had slipped into disrepair and closed.

== Renovation and restoration ==
In 2001 the Live Oak Public Libraries set forth a campaign to renovate and expand the historic building. It closed in 1997 due to a leaking roof, water damage, and a lack of funding. A fund-raising effort began and was able to support a $1.3 million renovation which was completed. Wings on either side of the original building were built. The library also received the latest technical equipment, such as a new classroom designed to provide interactive computer learning. Collections which were moved for safety were returned, and expanded to a collection of 3,000, with an emphasis on the Harlem Renaissance. The restructuring was done in the same architectural style as the building was initially erected in, and all additions would adhere to the library's historical roots. The addition was completed in 2003 on the 90th anniversary of its first opening. After the renovation the library received multiple awards from organizations on both the state and national levels. In 2004 the library was awarded by the Historic Savannah Foundation the Historic Preservation Award. In 2005 the building received multiple awards from the Georgia Trust for Historic Preservation; the 2005 Georgia Preservation Award, as well as the 2005 Marguerite Williams Award which recognizes one project which had the greatest impact on preservation in the state. Also in 2005 the library won the National Preservation Award from the National Trust for Historic Preservation. The centennial of the library was held in August 2014, when a historical marker was erected in front of the building denoting the history of the location and building for the Savannah community.
