= Lawtonville Baptist Church =

Historic church in South Carolina, United States

- U.S. National Register of Historic Places
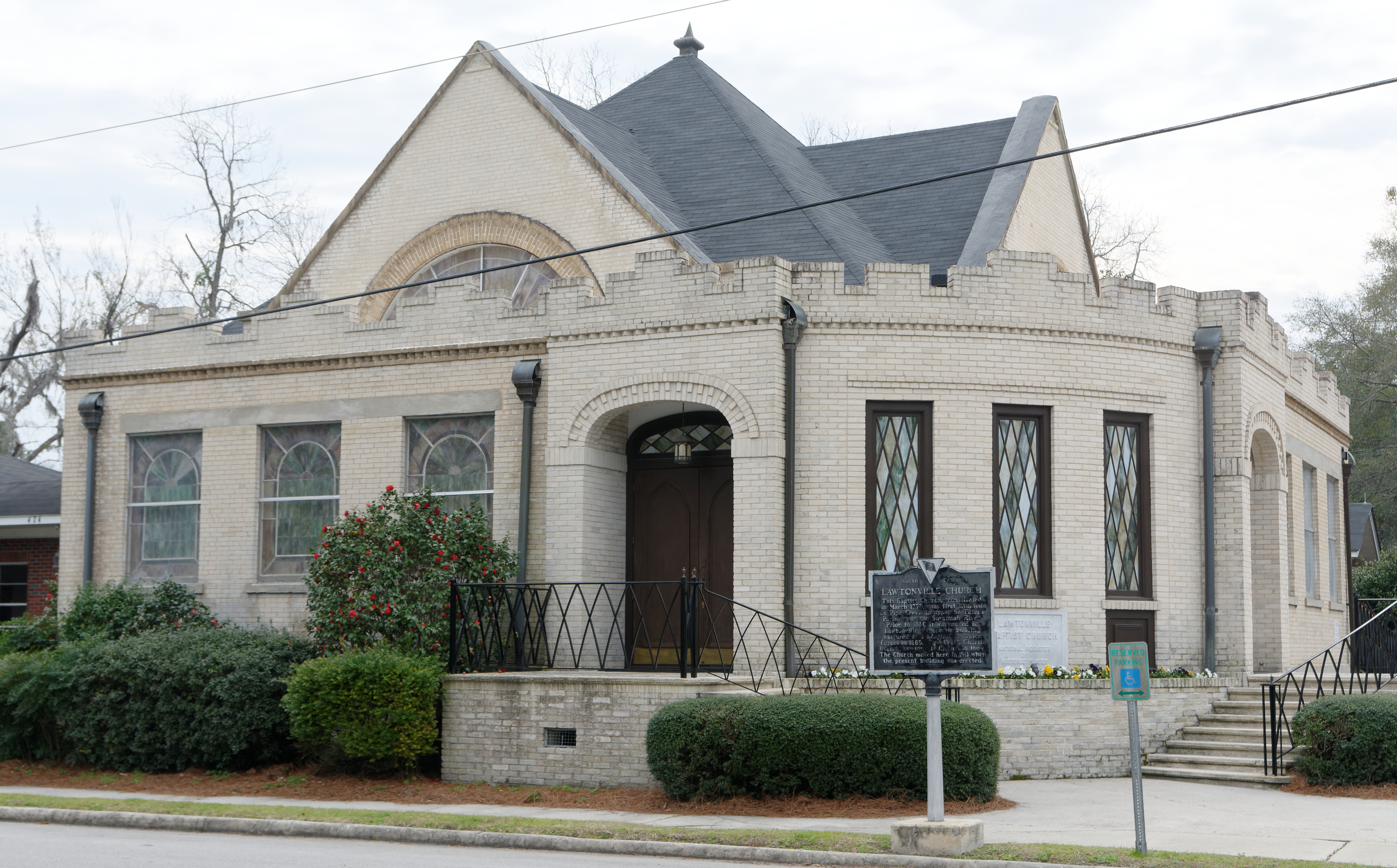

- Location within South Carolina Location within the United States
- Location: 194 E. 4th St, Estill, South Carolina
- Coordinates: 32.7549°N 81.23826°W
- Area: less than two acres
- Built: 1911
- Architect: Julian DeBruyn Kops
- Architectural style: Late Gothic Revival
- NRHP reference No.: 12000848
- Added to NRHP: October 9, 2012

Lawtonville Baptist Church is a historic Baptist church located at Estill, Hampton County, South Carolina. It was built in 1911 and is a brick building with a complex pavilion roof. It features projecting gables, stained glass windows, and a rear entrance that resembles a castle keep in the Late Gothic Revival style. In 1945, the congregation added a Sunday School building to the east of the original church building, and a music building was added in 1962. The church was renovated in 1973.

It was listed on the National Register of Historic Places in 2012.
