= Federal Correctional Institution, Estill =

Medium-security prison in South Carolina, US

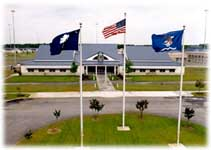
- Interactive map of Federal Correctional Institution, Estill
- Location: Hampton County, near Estill, South Carolina; 32.7213°N 81.2549°W
- Status: Operational
- Security class: Medium-security (with minimum-security prison camp)
- Population: 1,100 (300 in prison camp)
- Managed by: Federal Bureau of Prisons

The Federal Correctional Institution, Estill (FCI Estill) is a low-security United States federal prison for male inmates in South Carolina. It is operated by the Federal Bureau of Prisons, a division of the United States Department of Justice. It also has an adjacent satellite camp for minimum-security male offenders.

FCI Estill is located approximately 50 miles north of Savannah, Georgia, 96 miles west of Charleston, South Carolina, and 95 miles south of the state capital, Columbia, South Carolina.

== Notable incidents ==
In 2005, a former correction officer assigned to FCI Estill was sentenced to 10 years in prison pursuant to his guilty plea of attempting to possess heroin with the intent to distribute. A joint investigation by the Department of Justice Office of Inspector General and the FBI revealed that the officer had agreed to provide an inmate with 5 pounds of heroin in exchange for $100,000.

In November 2009, inmate Ernesto A. Martin, age 41, and another inmate, whom the Bureau of Prisons did not identify, became involved in an altercation over a card game, during which Martin stabbed the unidentified inmate numerous times. Martin was indicted by a federal grand jury in March 2010 for assault with intent to commit murder. Martin was subsequently convicted and transferred to the United States Penitentiary, Coleman, a high-security facility in Florida.

On May 26, 2011, a large scale fight broke out on the recreation yard of FCI Estill. At about 8:00 PM, Hampton County 911 was alerted to "a fight with multiple injured" and advised to expect heavy casualties. Nine inmates were transported to local hospitals, two with severe injuries. Paramedics set up a triage on site to treat about 50 patients who did not need to be transported. According to ambulance reports from the scene, prisoners had been beaten with shovels, rakes, and hoes, and had wounds ranging from deep lacerations to possible broken bones. The FBI was called in to investigate what prompted the fight and how many inmates were involved.

On March 15, 2016, former corrections officer Jermaine Creech, of Blackville, South Carolina, pleaded guilty to providing inmates with marijuana.

Early on April 13, 2020, a violent EF4 tornado hit the prison, heavily damaging it. There were no casualties at the prison, but the damage was so severe that the prisoners had to be moved to Pennsylvania.

== See also ==
- List of U.S. federal prisons
- Federal Bureau of Prisons
- Incarceration in the United States
