= Estill, South Carolina =

- Town
- Downtown Estill

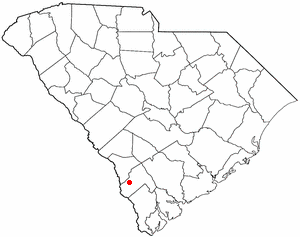
- Location of Estill, South Carolina
- Coordinates: 32°45′16″N 81°14′28″W
- Country: United States
- State: South Carolina
- County: Hampton

Area
  - Total: 3.23 sq mi (8.37 km^{2})
  - Land: 3.23 sq mi (8.37 km^{2})
  - Water: 0 sq mi (0.00 km^{2})
- Elevation: 112 ft (34 m)

Population (2020)
  - Total: 1,821
  - Density: 563.8/sq mi (217.69/km^{2})
- Time zone: UTC-5 (Eastern (EST))
  - Summer (DST): UTC-4 (EDT)
- ZIP codes: 29918, 29939
- Area codes: 803, 839
- FIPS code: 45-23830
- GNIS feature ID: 2406461
- Website: www.townofestill.sc.gov

Estill is a town in Hampton County, South Carolina, United States. As of the 2020 census, Estill had a population of 1,821.

== Geography ==
Estill is located 52 miles (84 km) north of Savannah, Georgia, 64 miles (103 km) northwest of Hilton Head Island and 93 miles (150 km) west of Charleston. The major industries are timber and agriculture.

== History ==
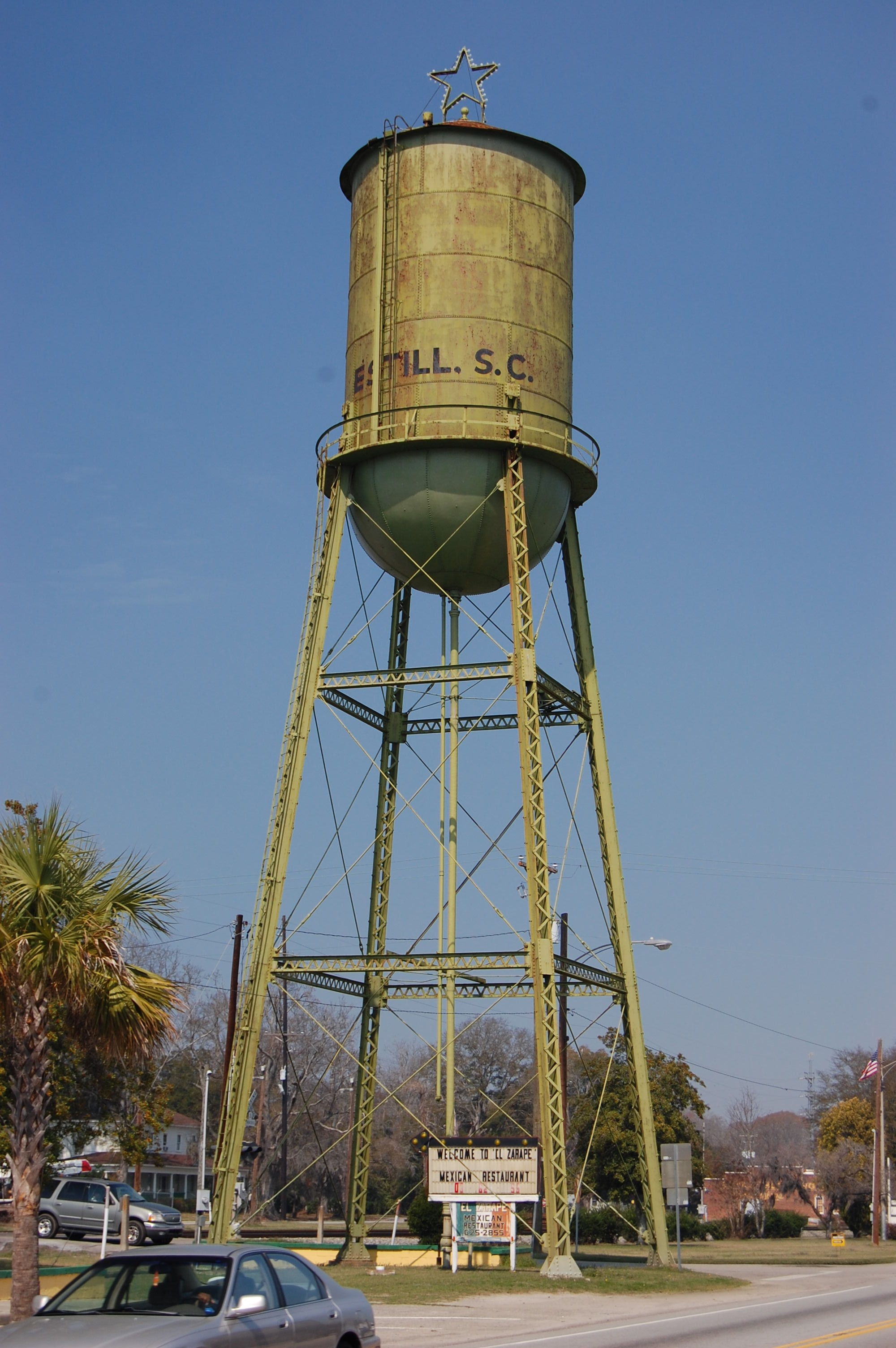
Water tower in downtown Estill

The town of Estill is located in the southern half of Hampton County. The town is named for Colonel John Holbrook Estill. Estill was formed in 1900 when the railroad, later Seaboard Air Line Railroad, needed a rail line between Augusta, Georgia and Savannah, Georgia. Upon construction of the rail line, the new town of Estill was incorporated in 1905.

The John Lawton House and Lawtonville Baptist Church are listed on the National Register of Historic Places.

Federal Correctional Institution, Estill is located near the town.

=== 2020 tornado ===
In the early morning of April 13, 2020, a large, violent EF4 Tornado struck areas just south of Estill. The tornado (which packed winds of 175 MPH) killed 5 and injured around 60 people. The nearby community of Nixville, South Carolina suffered a direct hit from the tornado, and sustained the brunt of the twister's impacts. The Federal Correctional Institution, Estill also sustained damage, resulting in many of the prison's inmates being temporarily transferred to the United States Penitentiary, Lewisburg in Lewisburg, Pennsylvania. The tornado was the first violent tornado in South Carolina since 1995.

== Education ==
There are three schools in the town: Estill Middle, and Estill Elementary, all of which are a part of Hampton County's School District 2, and Patrick Henry Academy, a private school.

== Demographics ==
Historical population
Census	Pop.	Note	%±
1910	460		—
1920	1,393		202.8%
1930	1,412		1.4%
1940	1,280		−9.3%
1950	1,659		29.6%
1960	1,865		12.4%
1970	1,954		4.8%
1980	2,308		18.1%
1990	2,387		3.4%
2000	2,425		1.6%
2010	2,040		−15.9%
2020	1,821		−10.7%
U.S. Decennial Census

=== 2020 census ===
Estill racial composition
Race	Num.	Perc.
White (non-Hispanic)	297	16.31%
Black or African American (non-Hispanic)	1,413	77.59%
Asian	6	0.33%
Pacific Islander	1	0.05%
Other/Mixed	26	1.43%
Hispanic or Latino	78	4.28%

As of the 2020 United States census, there were 1,821 people, 889 households, and 620 families residing in the town.

=== 2010 census ===
As of the census of 2010, there were 2,040 people, residing in the town. The racial makeup of the town was 16.0% White, 77.7% African American, 0.6% Native American, 0.1% from other races, and 0.7% from two or more races. Hispanic or Latino of any race were 4.8% of the population.

There were 909 households, in which 79.5% were occupied and 20.5% were vacant.

In the town, the population comprised 30.8% under the age of 18, 11.5% from 20 to 29, 10.3% from 30 to 39, 12.0% from 40 to 49, and 12.6% from 50 to 59, 11.9% from 60 to 69 and 10.85% over 69 years old.

== Government ==
Kim Wiley, Mayor of Estill, is the first woman to hold the office.

== Notable people ==
- Benny Gordon, (1932–2008), singer
- Hilda Grayson Finney (1913–1976), educator
