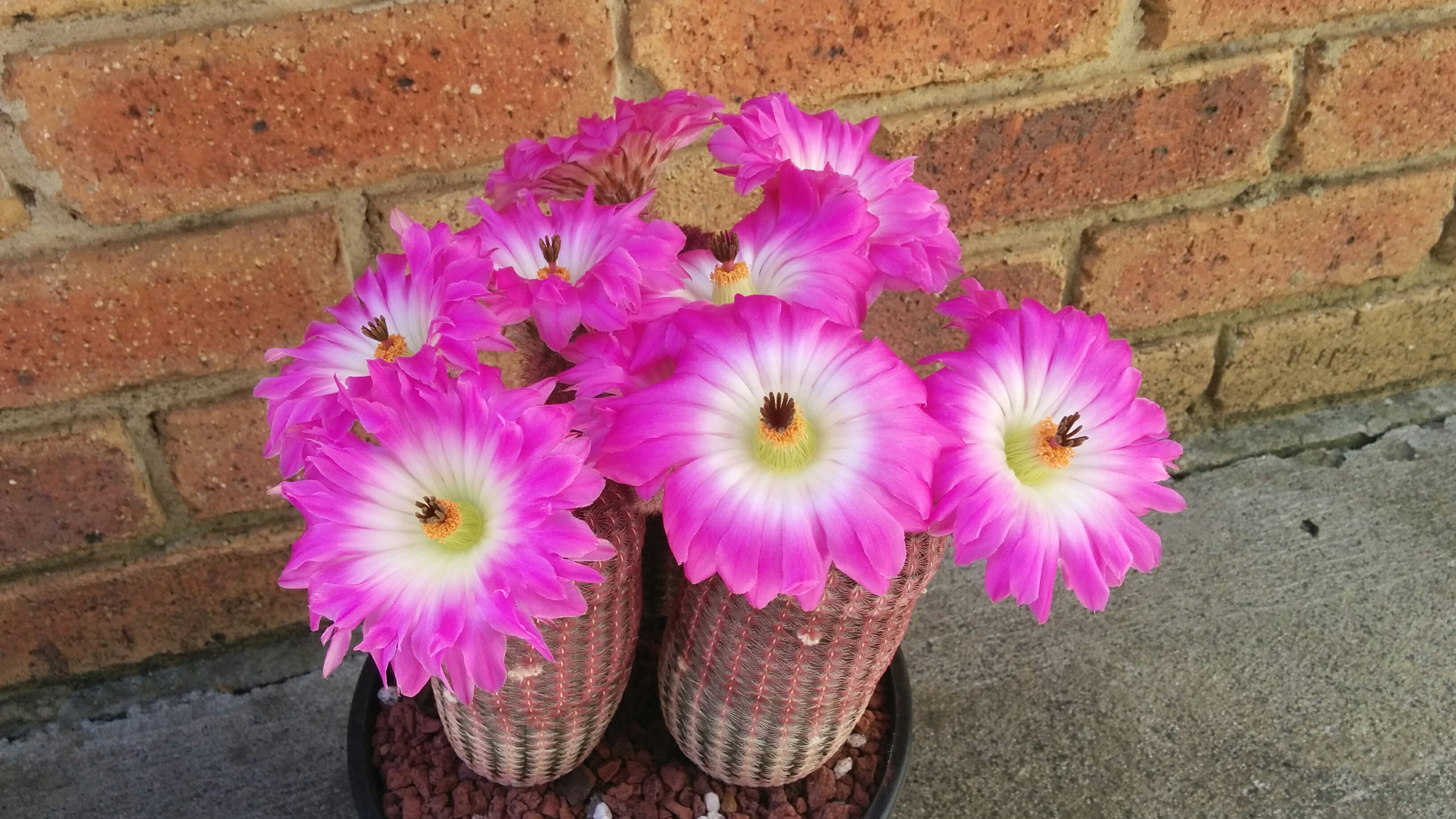
- Echinocereus rigidissimus subsp. rubispinus in flower

Conservation status
- Least Concern (IUCN 3.1)

Scientific classification
- Kingdom: Plantae
- Clade: Tracheophytes
- Clade: Angiosperms
- Clade: Eudicots
- Order: Caryophyllales
- Family: Cactaceae
- Subfamily: Cactoideae
- Genus: Echinocereus
- Species: E. rigidissimus

Binomial name
- Echinocereus rigidissimus (Engelm.) F.Haage

Subspecies
- Echinocereus rigidissimus ssp. rigidissimus; Echinocereus rigidissimus ssp. rubispinus

= Echinocereus rigidissimus =

Species of cactus

Echinocereus rigidissimus, commonly known as the Arizona rainbow cactus or rainbow hedgehog cactus, is a solitary-growing cactus that rarely branches or offsets with age.

== Description ==
Echinocereus rigidissimus grows to a height of 6 to 30 cm, and a width of 4 to 11 cm when mature, with pectinate radial spines curved slightly towards the stem. There are 15 to 26 low ribs that are flatly tuberculated. The new spines are initially reddish to magenta and fades to a yellow or light pink color when they mature. Central spines are not formed. Echinocereus rigidissimus flowers in flushes throughout the spring season, with multiple buds borne atop the plant from younger areoles. The flowers are bright pink in colour with a white coloured throat. The flowers appear at the tips of the shoots, are 6 to 7 centimeters long and reach a diameter of 6 to 9 centimeters. If pollination is successful, Echinocereus rigidissimus forms circular shaped, greenish to dark purplish fruit, with white flesh and dark brown to black seeds approximately 3 months after flowering. Since it rarely offsets, Echinocereus rigidissimus is propagated by seed.

=== Subspecies ===
Accepted Subspecies:

Image	Scientific name	Distribution
	Echinocereus rigidissimus subsp. rigidissimus	Arizona, New Mexico, Mexico
	Echinocereus rigidissimus subsp. rubispinus (Gerhart Frank & A.B.Lau) N.P.Taylor	Mexico (W. Chihuahua: Sierra Oscura)

== Distribution ==
The natural habitat of Echinocereus rigidissimus is distributed abundantly throughout Chihuahua and Sonora in Mexico, as well as in the United States in Arizona and New Mexico. It grows at elevation from 1200 to 2000 metres above sea level. This cactus prefers south facing slopes and is rarely seen on flat ground. It prefers the 1500 meter elevation. Plants are resistant to small grass fires, but cannot tolerate hotter fires. With perfect habitat, these plants have been seen growing up to 45 centimeters in height. A 2018 measurement of one plant in the Santa Catalina mountains showed a height of 48 centimeters, a record. Flowering occurs from late April to early June depending on the elevation and spring heat. These plants will not flower when stressed, but lack of flowering is rare. Their habitat has been negatively affected by cattle, cactus collectors and off road vehicles. These plants are becoming less common in southern Arizona.

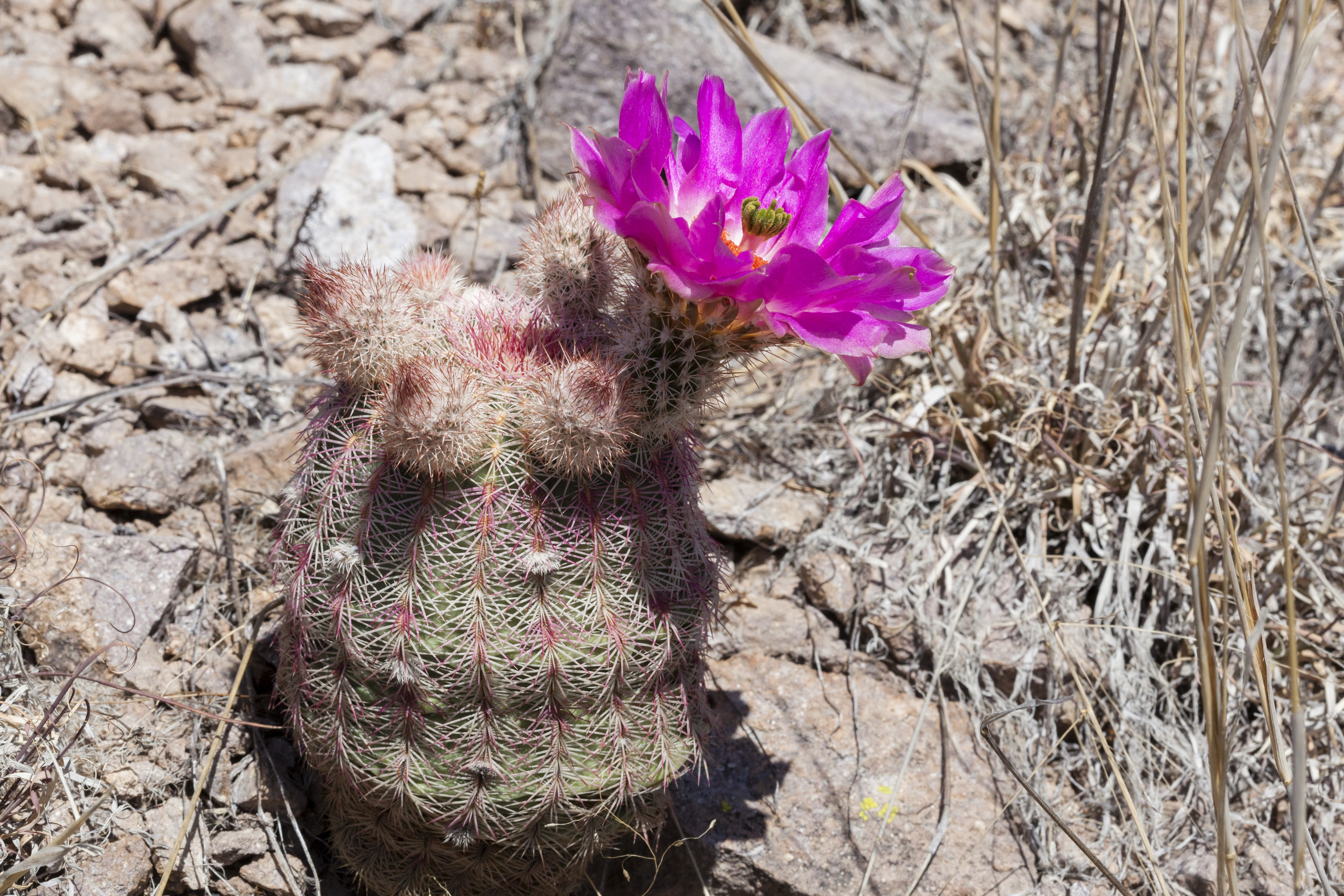
Plant growing in habitat in Hidalgo County, New Mexico

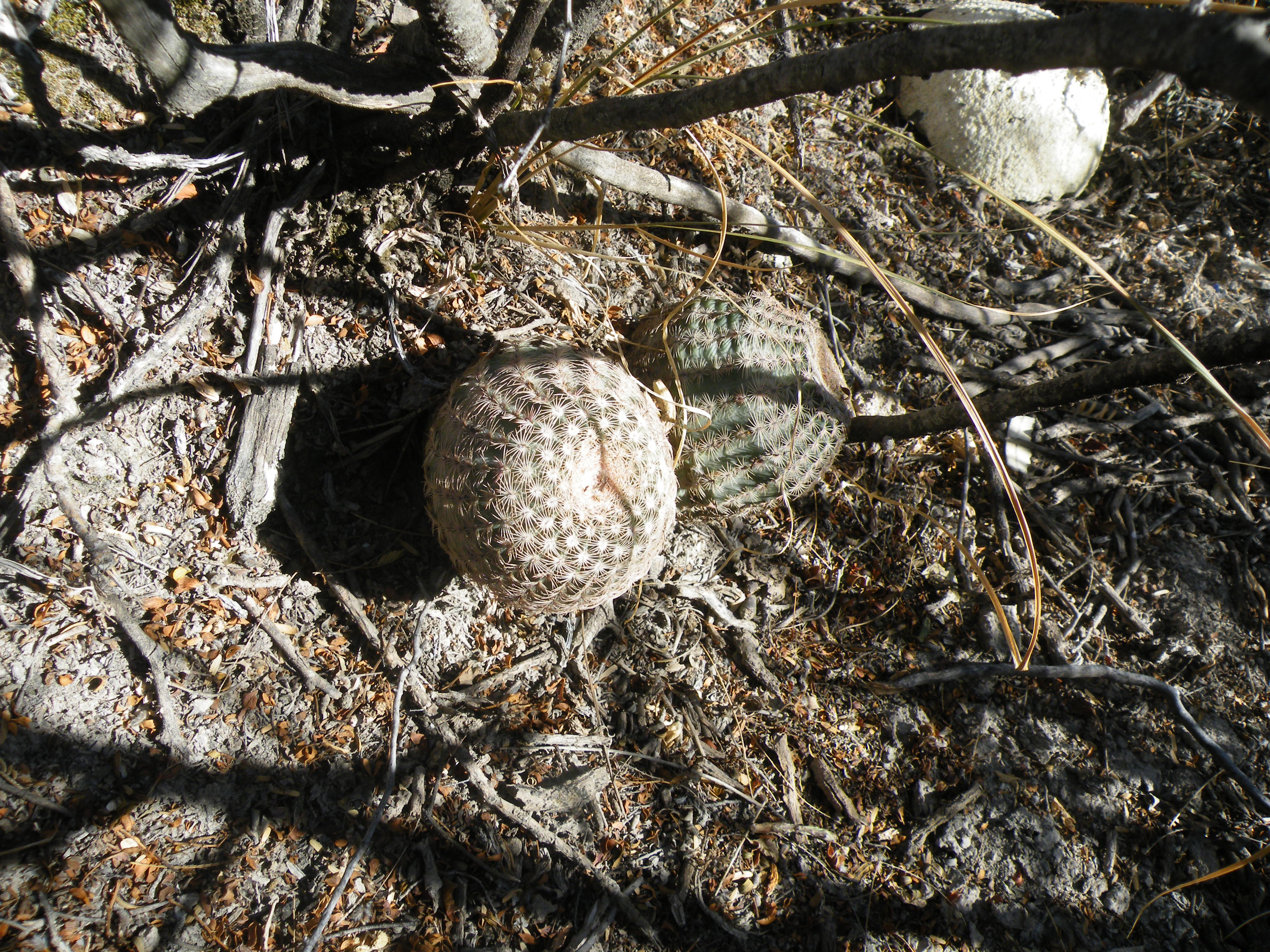
Habitat in Villa Arista, San Luis Potosi

== Taxonomy ==
The first description as Cereus pectinatus var. rigidissimus by George Engelmann was published in 1856. The specific epithet rigidissimus is the comparative of the Latin word rigidus, means 'stiff' and refers to the thorns of the species. In a plant catalog from the Kakteen-Haage company in 1897, the species was placed in the genus Echinocereus. Nomenclature synonyms are Echinocereus pectinatus var. rigidissimus (Engelm.) Rümpler (1885), Echinocereus dasyacanthus var. rigidissimus (Engelm.) W.T.Marshall (1941) and Echinocereus pectinatus f. rigidissimus (Engelm.) Krainz (1967).

== Cultivation ==
Echinocereus rigidissimus requires porous soil as it is sensitive to overwatering. It prefers a soil with plenty of stones with little organic material to ensure that it dries as quickly as possible. Echinocereus rigidissimus requires full sun to part shade during its active growing season from spring through to early autumn, as well as adequate air circulation to reduce the chance of rotting. In winter abstain from watering Echinocereus rigidissimus and keep the soil mixture dry, as it helps encourage flowering in the spring season. Echinocereus rigidissimus is hardy to temperatures of −12 °C.
