= List of European tornadoes and tornado outbreaks =

This is a list of notable tornadoes, tornado outbreaks, and tornado outbreak sequences that have occurred in Europe.

== Pre-20th century ==
Event	Date	Area	Tornadoes	Casualties	Notes
Sardinia tornado	200	Sardinia, Italy	1	?	A tornado in Sardinia. The earliest known European tornado and the first-ever recorded tornado.
France tornado of 580	580	France	1	Many fatalities	Tornado tracked 1 mile (1.6 km), killing many people.
France tornado of 588	588	France	1	Unknown	Tornado, described as "snakes from the clouds", that destroyed a village.
689 Sachsen tornado	689	Sachsen, Germany	1	Unknown	Tornado in Sachsen.
788 Freising tornado	Summer 788	Freising, Francia	1	?	Tornado in Freising.
Northern Umbria tornado	793	Umbria, Italy	1	?	Tornado in the northern parts of Umbria.
885 Württemberg tornado	885	Württemberg, Germany	1	?	Tornado in Württemberg.
962 Poitiers tornado	March 962	Poitiers, France	1	Unknown	Tornado reported in Poitiers.
979 Kiev tornado	979	Kiev, Kievan Rus'	1	?	Tornado in Kiev. The tornado was never rated.
989 Sachsen tornado	989	Sachsen, Germany	1	Unknown	Low-end F1/T2 tornado in Sachsen.
1011 Württemberg tornado	1011	Württemberg, Germany	1	?	Tornado in Württemberg.
1043 Kievan Rus' waterspout	1043	Kievan Rus'	1	?	Waterspout in the mouth of the Danube River in Kievan Rus'.
Rosdalla tornado	30 April 1054	Kilbeggan, Ireland	1	0	Recorded in the Annals of the Four Masters, which described a "round tower of fire" (Irish: cloictheach tenedh) that sucked in birds, a greyhound dog, and clothing, then dropped them.
Northern Umbria tornado of 1067	6 December 1067	Umbria, Italy	1	?	Tornado in the northern parts of Umbria.
London tornado of 1091	17 October 1091	London, Middlesex, Kingdom of England	1	2	The London Tornado of 1091 is the earliest reported tornado in England, occurring in London on Friday, 17 October 1091. It has been reckoned by modern assessment as possibly a T8 on the TORRO scale (roughly equivalent to low-end F4 on the Fujita scale) making it potentially the strongest recorded tornado in the British Isles, although this estimate is based on reports written 30 years after the tornado. The church of St Mary-le-Bow in the city of London was badly damaged; four rafters 26 feet (7.9 m) long were driven into the ground so that only 4 feet (1.2 m) protruded above the surface. Other churches in the area were demolished, as were over 600 (mostly wooden) houses. For all the damage inflicted, the tornado claimed just two known victims from a population of about 18,000. The tornado is mentioned in chronicles by Florence of Worcester and William of Malmesbury, the latter describing it as "a great spectacle for those watching from afar, but a terrifying experience for those standing near".
Vyšehrad Tornado	30 July 1119	Vyšehrad, Bohemia	1	?	Earliest known and perhaps strongest Czech tornado, possibly rated F3/F4. Destroyed the palace of the Czech duke at Vyšehrad, which is now in Prague.
Czech tornado of 1144	14 May 1144	Bohemia	2	0	Two tornadoes near the military camp of Duke Vladislaus II. This source may describe the first storm chasers ever documented in history.
1255 Prague tornado	8 April 1255	Prague, Bohemia	1	1	Tornado at Prague Castle.
Russian tornado of 1406	1406	near Nizhny Novgorod, Russia	1	1 fatality known	According to the Trinity Chronicle, a tornado occurred near Nizhny Novgorod. This is the earliest known Russian tornado. It is said to have picked up a horse-drawn carriage and threw it so far away that it could no longer be seen. The carriage and the horse were later found but the man remained missing. Another source says that "a mighty storm and whirlwind ravage[d] the village", suggesting that structures were also affected by the tornado.
1406 Venice tornado	1406	Venice, Venetian Republic	1	Many fatalities	A strong tornado hit Venice, destroying many houses and killing many people.
1453 Rodenberg tornado	1453	Rodenberg, Germany	1	18	A strong tornado moved through the village, destroying all barns and around 50 houses. 18 people were killed. According to tornadoliste it was rated F2.
1535 Oleśnica tornado	11 September 1535	Oleśnica, Poland	1	5	An F4 tornado destroyed part of the town. The roofs and gables on several houses were destroyed and streets were littered with shingles as a result. A brewery was completely destroyed. The tornado also damaged the castle of Henry IV, Duke of Saxony. 5 people were killed when the gable of the city hall collapsed on them.
Lequile tornado	22 June 1546	Lequile, Italy	1	24	A tornado struck the villages of Lequile and San Pietro in Lama in southern Apulia near Lecce, causing catastrophic damage along a roughly 3 km long path. The tornado uprooted trees, destroyed houses and blew the roof off a church. 24 people were reportedly killed.
Grand Harbour of Malta tornado	23 September 1551 (or 1556)	Malta	1	≈600 fatalities	An intense waterspout came on-shore and struck the Grand Harbour of Valletta. A shipping armada which was about to go into battle was destroyed, causing the deaths of around 600 people. TORRO suggests the tornado caused T7 damage, equivalent to a high-end F3 or low-end F4 on the Fujita scale. Perhaps the deadliest European tornado.
Nottingham tornado	7 July 1558 (or 1 July or 11 July)	Nottingham, United Kingdom	1	5–7	On either 1, 7 or 11 July (sources differ) 1558 a tornado struck Sneinton (which today is a suburb of Nottingham). According to one contemporary report, the tornado tore through two towns, destroying all the houses and churches. Another independent report cites the near total destruction of the village of Sneinton. It is also reported that the tornado sucked water out of the river Trent and ripped trees out of the ground, throwing them several feet away. One child and 5 (possibly 6, sources differ) men were killed. TORRO suggests a rating of T7 for the tornado, equivalent to high-end F3.
Kestřany tornado	24 May 1582	Kestřany, Bohemia	1	?	A tornado struck Kestřany, destroying houses and uprooting trees. The tornado received a rating of F3.
Rockhausen tornado	15 July 1582	Rockhausen, Germany	1	?	The tornado which was rated F4 nearly completely destroyed the village of Rockhausen; only two houses remained untouched.
Neznašov tornado	6 July 1585	Neznašov, Bohemia	1	?	A tornado formed near Neznašov. From there it moved through a forest, uprooting trees along the way, before it reached the village of Temelín, where it completely destroyed several houses. The tornado then continued to Sedlec where it destroyed another house and turned a barn upside down. Multiple academic sources list this tornado as an F3.
Koclířov tornado	14 August 1585	Koclířov, Bohemia	1	?	A tornado formed near Kocléřov, which uprooted trees and destroyed several houses, including one manor. People were reportedly hurled into the air by the tornado and thrown into the mud, where they laid unconscious for some time. ESWD lists this tornado as an F3.
Augsburg tornado	2 July 1587	Augsburg, Holy Roman Empire	1	?	The tornado occurred between 12 and 1 p.m. The event has been published in a pamphlet (including the oldest known depiction of a tornado) by Hans Schultes der Jüngere.
Rome tornado of 1645	4 December 1645	Rome, Papal States	1	Many fatalities	Probably F3.
Lincolnshire tornado	23 October 1666	Lincolnshire, United Kingdom	1	3	On 23 October 1666 the most intense tornado on record for the UK (and England) passed through Welbourn, Wellingore, Navenby and Boothby Graffoe in Lincolnshire. The tornado has been rated at T8-9, roughly equivalent to an F4 on the Fujita scale. The tornado tracked for 5 km and reached a maximum path width of 200 meters. Thomas Short writing in 1749 described it as "it came with such Violence and Force, that at Welbourn it levelled most of the Houses to the Ground; broke down some, and tore up other Trees by the Roots, scattering abroad much Corn and Hay. One Boy only was killed. It went on to Wellingore, where it overthrew some Houses, and killed two Children in them. Thence it passed on and touched the Skirts of Navenby, and ruined a few Houses. Keeping its Course to the next Town Boothby Graffoe, where it dashed the Church Steeple in pieces, furiously rent the Church itself, both Stone and Timber Work, left little of either standing, only the Body of the Steeple."
La Rochelle – Paris tornadoes	September 1669	France	>2	?	Longest tracked tornado family in Europe at 400 km (250 mi), but the distance may be greater as the tornado possibly started as a waterspout over the Bay of Biscay. Earliest-known French tornadoes.
Cádiz tornado	15 March 1671	Cádiz, Andalusia, Spain	1	≥600 fatalities	Sánchez-Laulhé (2005) classified this tornado as an F3, although ESWD lists it as an F4. The tornado destroyed houses and capsized many ships leading to the death of at least 600 people, although the number could be as high as 1500 fatalities.
Veneto tornado	29 July 1686	Terrazzo, Dolo, Italy	1	8 fatalities	A strong and long tracked tornado caused extensive damage from Terrazzo to Dolo, travelling for 40 miles in 1 hour, killing 8 people and injuring many others. This might have been an F3.
Kaliningrad tornado	12 August 1701	Kaliningrad, Russia	1	?	ESWD lists this tornado as an F3.
Olomouc tornado	13 August 1701	Olomouc, Moravia	1	?	Strong winds presumably from a tornado caused serious damage at Jindřichův Hradec and at Praskolesy near Telč. A number of houses were reportedly completely swept away. Despite this scientific literature only indicates an intensity of F1-F2.
Schleswig-Holstein Tornado	26 February 1718	Schleswig-Holstein, Holy Roman Empire	1	?	On the night of 25 to 26 February 1718 a violent tornado struck somewhere in modern-day Schleswig-Holstein. Not much is known about this tornado but reliable sources list the rating as an F4/T8 and indicate that well built stone houses were destroyed by this tornado.
Möklinta Tornado	27 September 1725	Möklinta, Sweden	1	?	One of the earliest known tornadoes in Sweden. The ESWD mentions that the tornado had an average width of 82 meters.
Rome tornado of 1749	12 June 1749	Rome, Papal States	1	2	Originated as a waterspout over the Tyrrhenian Sea before coming on land and tracking for about 38 km. Reportedly devastated large parts of Rome. ESWD lists a rating of F3.
Groden Tornado	26 June 1756	Cuxhaven, Holy Roman Empire	1	0	A violent tornado struck Groden (today part of Cuxhaven). A strong "whirlwind" accompanied by severe hail and heavy rain caused extensive damage in the village. According to contemporary sources several houses were destroyed or severely damaged. The roof of the local church also suffered extensive damage. Large trees were either snapped or uprooted. Tornadoliste lists this tornado as an F4.
Padua tornado	17 August 1756	Veneto, Italy	1	8	A strong tornado, that was rated IF2, hit the city of Padua, apparently damaging the Palazzo della Ragione, destroying part of its roof.
Great Malvern tornado of 1761	14 October 1761	Malvern, Worcestershire, Great Britain	1	?	
1764 Woldegk tornado	29 June 1764	Germany	3	1	Small tornado outbreak over Germany with 1 F5, 1 F3 and 1 F1. The F5 tornado traveled for 35 km along a 400–800 m wide path. 1 person was killed and 3 more were injured. A very detailed survey of the damage caused by this tornado was conducted by Gottlob Burchard Genzmer. This survey was remarkable for its time and would even hold up to modern scientific standards. The tornado caused phenomenal damage. In a field, the stumps of previously felled trees were pulled out of the ground and carried away. Houses were completely razed down to their foundations. Heavy cobblestones weighing 75 kg were rolled and according to eyewitness reports, a meteorological tsunami-like event occurred as the tornado tracked over a lake. ESWD lists the strongest tornado from this outbreak as an F5/T11, T11 being the highest rating on the TORRO scale. This tornado is regarded as the strongest in German history and is one of only 2 F5 tornadoes that have ever been recorded in the country.: FU / F0 / F1 / F2 / F3 / F4 / F5; 0 / 0 / 1 / 0 / 1 / 0 / 1
1773 Marton tornado	10 October 1773	Marton, Yorkshire, United Kingdom	1	?	A destructive IF4 tornado ripped through Marton, Yorkshire on the morning of 10 October 1773. A house was completely leveled along with its outbuildings, trees uprooted and barns torn apart.
1774 Central Europe tornadoes	19–20 June 1774	Germany, Czech Republic	2	3	High-end F2/T5 tornado hit Götzenhain, Germany along an 11.5 kilometer path, killing 3. An F1 tornado hit Telč, Czech Republic: FU / F0 / F1 / F2 / F3 / F4 / F5; 0 / 0 / 1 / 1 / 0 / 0 / 0
Belfast and Carrickfergus tornado	2 September 1775	Ireland	1	?	A small tornado which damaged crops and structures and lifted people into the air. It also lifted the waters in Larne Lough, hit land on Islandmagee and then disappeared into the North Channel.
1776 Barbaira Tornado	6 August 1776	France	1	0	F2 tornado hit Barbaira, France.
Gräfenberg tornado	8 June 1778	Germany	1	7 fatalities, 10 injuries	A low-end F3/T6 tornado struck the town, killing 7 people and injuring 10 others.
Hainichen tornado	23 April 1800	Germany	1	0	A violent tornado formed near the town of Hainichen at around 4–5 pm and subsequently tracked for around 8 minutes for 9.5 km in the north-northeast direction. The tornado was 50 meters wide. In Arnsdorf all houses lost their roofs. The tornado subsequently apparently intensified before striking Dittersdorf, where several houses and stables were completely destroyed. Lots of livestock was wiped out and several people were severely injured. After this, the tornado tracked into a forest, where no tree in its path remained standing. Some trees were reportedly debarked and thrown hundreds of meters away. Finally, the tornado struck Etzdorf, where several houses were completely leveled. Thankfully no-one was killed in the tornado because most people were out in the fields but 5 people were injured. ESWD lists this tornado as an F5/T10, one of only two documented F5 tornadoes in Germany.
Southsea tornado	14 December 1810	Portsmouth, Hampshire, England, UK	1	0	Third-strongest British tornado, rated a T7-8 (high-end F3 to low-end F4). Some homes were completely leveled and others so badly damaged that they had to be demolished. Chimneys were blown down and lead on a bank roof was 'rolled up like a piece of canvas'.
Horb Tornado	15 April 1831	Horb am Neckar, Germany	1	0	A tornado affected Horb am Neckar in modern-day Baden-Württemberg. The tornado reportedly ripped the roofs off several buildings, destroyed numerous trees and threw people and animals alike high into the air, although no fatalities were reported. ESWD lists this tornado as an F2/T5.
Louny tornado	2 May 1831	Louny, Bohemia	1	1	2 people were reportedly killed by the tornado, which might have been an F2 to F3.
Carrickfergus tornado	12 June 1834	Carrickfergus, Ireland	1	0	A tornado struck Kilroot, damaging a house and taking the thatch off it. It also killed a hen, which was carried into the wind, and lifted two people off the ground; they were uninjured.
Nýrsko tornado	25 May 1843	Nýrsko, Bohemia	1	2	A tornado killed several people, threw people and cows high into the air and damaged 28 houses as well as the church. ESWD lists a rating of F2 and a rather long path length of 37 km.
Cartagena Tornado	21 November 1843	Cartagena, Spain	1	4	The tornado is listed in ESWD as an F2.
Southern Germany Tornadoes	22 June 1845	Engstingen, Germany	2	?	An outbreak of severe weather across southern Germany produced at least 2 tornadoes. One tornado rated F3 caused a 9.5 km long path of destruction through a forest near Engstingen. In Straubing, Bavaria an F2 tornado damaged several houses and a church.
Seine-Maritime tornado	19–20 August 1845	France	5	75	A small outbreak produced at least 5 tornadoes in France, the Netherlands and Germany. The strongest tornado of this outbreak was an F5 tornado that passed through the Cailly Valley after having formed near Le Houlme. Along its path the tornado caused damage that experts at Keraunos described as beyond imagination. The tornado completely destroyed three spinning mills, some of which had just been built. One of the mills was a solid 4 story brick building and another was of a build quality that one quote: "dared to qualify as excessive ". The tornado also destroyed several regular houses and uprooted, snapped and debarked numerous large trees, throwing some of them a considerable distance away. Debris of various kinds was found scattered up to 30 km away from the tornado. The tornado killed at least 75 people and injured 130 more, making it the deadliest tornado in French history. It is also one of only 2 recorded F5 tornadoes in France, the other being the one that occurred in Palluel on 24 June 1967. Keraunos also mentions two other tornadoes that occurred in France on that day: an F3 in Villey-sur-Tille and an F1 in Avosnes. There were also at least 2 other tornadoes outside of France: one in Zevenbergen, the Netherlands and another in Trier, Germany.
Middle Poland tornado	31 May 1866	Jarluty Duże, Humięcino	4	≥7 fatalities, 18 injuries	A small outbreak of 4 tornadoes occurred across western and central Poland. The strongest of the outbreak was an F3-F4 tornado that hit Humiecino and Jarłuty, destroying several houses and lifting animals. The tornado killed at least 7 people, although 12 remained missing. It reportedly tore the limbs off some of its victims. The tornado was preceded by a hailstorm, producing hail up to potato size, coating the ground in a 9-inch layer of hail. Another tornado, listed as F2 in the ESWD, touched down just northeast of this tornado a short time later and destroyed 2 houses. This second tornado was presumably from the same cyclic parent supercell. Two other tornadoes occurred further west earlier that afternoon. One of these near Święte just northwest of Wroclaw was rated F2 on account of damaging 31 houses and lifting an entire windmill.
Palazzolo dello Stella tornado	28 July 1867	Palazzolo dello Stella, Italy	1	15 fatalities, 50 injuries	A strong tornado, which might have been an F3-F4, hit the villages of San Mauro, Ronchis and especially Palazzolo dello Stella. 15 people were killed and 50 more were injured.
Veneto tornado	24 September 1867	Venice, Italy	1	20 fatalities, 15 injuries	A strong tornado, that Is preliminary rated IF3 by the ESWD, struck Mestre and Venice and caused damage along a 47 km path. The tornado killed 20 people and 15 more were injured.
Tuscany tornado	29 July 1868	Roccatederighi, Grosseto, Italy	4	0	An intense 400 m wide tornado, possibly an F3, struck Roccatederighi, Roccastrada and surrounding areas in Tuscany. Several houses lost their roofs and some were even partially demolished. Some olive groves are said to have been almost completely annihilated and several large chestnut, walnut and oak trees were snapped and twisted. Ground scouring was also reportedly observed.
Brno tornado	13 October 1870	Brno, Moravia	1	0	Detailed scientific description by Gregor Mendel. Mendel's detailed study of the tornado's damage reportedly would also hold up to modern standards today. One interesting thing is that Mendel, who witnessed the tornado personally, described the rotation as anticyclonic or clockwise in the northern hemisphere, which is unusual for these parts. Scientific literature suggests a rating of F0-F1.
Legacurry tornado	7 January 1871	Legacurry, County Donegal, Ireland	1	0	A tornado was mentioned in the Belfast News-Letter. The tornado originated from the sea and came onshore at 1:00 PM GMT. It first leveled a house to the ground and completely destroyed barns along with numerous office buildings. A calf was lifted into the air and thrown violently against a wall, killing it instantly. Two other individuals had sections of their homes and corn stacks carried away by the storm. The tornado is believed to have attained IF3 intensity.
South-East Sicily tornado	24 October 1872	Modica, Palazzolo Acreide	1+	63 fatalities	One or perhaps two intense tornadoes (F3-F4) carved a path of destruction through the southern and eastern portion of Hyblean Mountains and struck the towns of Modica and Palzzolo Acreide killing 63 people. (31 near Modica and 32 in Palazzolo)
Vienna tornado	29 June 1873	Vienna, Austria	1	?	A (possible) tornado struck Vienna during the 1873 Vienna World's Fair and affected the festivities. Besides the tornado, the thunderstorm also caused large hail and torrential rain, which caused widespread flooding. According to contemporary newspaper reports the tornado damaged several houses, including damage to gables, chimneys, roofs and windows, and uprooted several trees. Some later sources attribute several fatalities to this tornado but ESWD only mentions many chickens being "battered to death" and newspaper reports only mention two people who drowned in the floodwaters. ESWD lists this tornado as an F2/T4 but also mentions that this might have been a gustnado instead of a tornado.
Gødvad – Kattrup tornado	6 September 1882	Gødvad, Kattrup, Denmark	1	?	A long tracked, violent F4 tornado struck Gødvad and Kattrup along a 32.3 kilometer long path. 6 half-timbered oak homes were destroyed, and trees were uprooted and thrown. A pond had all of its water sucked up. Several fields sustained scouring, and in one case the scouring was very deep. This is the strongest tornado ever recorded in Denmark.
Catania tornado	7 October 1884	Catania, Italy	1	30 fatalities, 600 injured	An extremely violent tornado caused great destruction around Catania. Many buildings were (almost) completely destroyed, telecommunications infrastructure damaged and trees uprooted along a 30 km path. 30 people died and about 600 others were injured. On December 13, 2025, the ESSL rated this tornado IF5
Caprarica di Lecce tornado	23 November 1884	Caprarica di Lecce, Italy	1	1 killed, 8 injured	An intense tornado struck Caprarica di Lecce and caused great destruction within the village. Among other things the bell tower collapsed, crushing 2 people. One of the two men crushed by the bell tower was killed, while the other was injured along with 7 others. ESWD lists this tornado as an F3.
Madrid tornado	12 May 1886	Madrid, Spain	1	47	An F3 tornado struck Madrid, causing extensive damage to buildings, some of which collapsed, killing the occupants, on a 12 km path from Carabanchel to Ciudad Lineal with a width of 1 km. It is the deadliest Spanish tornado of the last two centuries.
Lonato tornado	14 May 1886	Lonato del Garda	1	5 fatalities	A strong or intense tornado (maybe an F2 or F3) tracked for 10 km from Castiglione dello Stiviere to Lake Garda and devastate the eastern part of the town of Lonato where many homes were badly damaged or destroyed.
Rhineland tornado	1 July 1891	North Rhineland, Germany	5	3 fatalities, 100 injured	Tornado outbreak over central Germany. 3 tornadoes are unclassified. 1 was an F0 that travelled 12 km from Beeskow to Müllrose (Brandenburg), and 1 was a powerful F4 that brought the total destruction of Anrath, a small village, killing 3 people and injuring 100 on a 20 km path. 8 cm hail fell near Anrath before the arrival of the tornado.
Novska tornado	31 May 1892	Croatia, Austria-Hungary	2	1	Strongest known tornado in Croatia. A large multivortex F4 twin-tornado struck the southern part of the village of Novska and surrounding woods. 1 person was killed, 3 people were heavily injured, and many had minor injuries. At least 150,000 trees were destroyed in its path. A train was derailed; one train wagon (14 t) was lifted at least 6 m into the air and thrown 30 meters onto a field. The average width of the tornado was 800 m, with the maximum width exceeding 1.2 km. Hail size from this tornadic supercell was 8 cm.
Badalona tornado	15 June 1892	Badalona, Catalonia, Spain	1	3 fatalities, Unknown injuries	An F2 tornado touched down in the village of Badalona, and a few factories were damaged, with the roof being partially removed and some walls either damaged or collapsed, injuring some people. Overall, the tornado killed 3 and injured others. It reached windspeeds between 150 and 190 km/h. "La Vanguardia" – newspaper.
Polesella tornado	19 July 1892	Polesella, Veneto, Italy	1	2 fatalities and 21 injured	A strong tornado struck the village of Polesella. This tornado might have been an F3 or F4.
Paris tornado	10 September 1896	Paris, France	1	5	The Paris tornado of 10 September 1896 is the only documented case of a tornado forming and dissipating within an urban area in France.
Central Germany tornado outbreak	18 March 1897	Germany	5	4 fatalities, 4 injured	A tornado outbreak produced 5 tornadoes over central Germany. The outbreak began with two tornadoes that struck the city of Gelsenkirchen. One of the tornadoes, which affected the district of Schalke, damaged several houses, commercial buildings and a glass factory. This tornado ended up killing 3 people and injuring 4 more. An F3/T6 tornado struck Kirberg and other nearby villages on a 40 km path, killing 1 person. Two other tornadoes struck Stelzen (Thüringen) and Fürth am Berg (Bayern).
Oria tornado	21 September 1897	Oria, Apulia, Italy	1	59 fatalities, 267 injuries	A strong F4 tornado struck the villages of Sava and Oria, killing 59 people and injuring 267 on a 40 km long and up to 850 meter wide path. At least 21 houses were destroyed and other buildings were severely damaged.
Cologne tornado	7 August 1898	Cologne, Germany	1	3 fatalities, 100 injured	A violent tornado struck the city of Cologne. The storm began 3 km from the city center, in Zollstock, accompanied by hail of 5 cm. The tornado caused heavy damage and was classified as an F4/T8. For instance, the tornado caused severe damage to a factory complex on the west side of the Rhine, where no building remained untouched and damage exceeded 400 thousand German Mark (about 3 million euros in today's money). On the other side of the Rhine damage was also severe: countless houses lost their roofs or were otherwise severely damaged, the spire of a Catholic church was torn off and a large dance hall was almost completely destroyed. The storm ended just northwest of Wipperfürth after it had traveled for 38 km and after it had killed 3 people and injured about 100.

== 20th century ==
Event	Date	Area	Tornadoes	Casualties	Notes
1902 Javaugues tornado	3 June 1902	France	1	1 fatality	An F3 tornado struck Javaugues and other villages along its 7 km path. With a width of 3 km, this is the widest documented French tornado.
1904 Moscow tornado	29 June 1904	Moscow, Russia	2	9-100+ fatalities	Two strong F2-F4 tornadoes struck eastern Moscow, causing severe damage along its 42 km path in a densely populated area and with a width of 400-700m. They killed over 100 people and wounded over 800.
1904 Sorrento tornado	22 August 1904	Italy	1	3 fatalities	A powerful waterspout became a high-end IF3 tornado struck the small village of Sorrento near Naples in southern Italy and causes severe damage to homes including several with exterior walls collapsed.
1905 Armavir tornado	1 March 1905	Armavir, Russia	1	?	Details unknown.
1906 Opladen tornado	14 August 1906	Opladen, Germany	1	1 fatality	An F3 tornado struck several villages along its 15 km path, killing 1 person and injuring 25 others.
1909 Scordia tornado	3 September 1909	Sicily, Italy	1	4 fatalities 200 injiures	A strong IF2 tornado causes heavy damage to the small town of Scordia killing 4.
1910 Central Europe tornado outbreak	11 May 1910	Germany, Czech Republic and Austria	10	1 injured	Tornado outbreak over Central Europe. 1 F3 tornado in the Czech Republic struck Klatovy and other villages over a 13 km path, with a width of 1 km.
1910 Lower Saxony tornadoes	4 June 1910	Lower Saxony, Germany	2	0	1 F3 tornado and 1 F4 tornado struck Bad Zwischenahn and Ostrhauderfehn.
1910 Germany tornadoes	22 July 1910	Germany	12	0	Tornado outbreak over Germany, with 12 tornadoes, causing severe damage. 1 F3 tornado struck Platten (Rhineland-Palatinate). Several other tornadoes produced F2-F3 damage, with paths of 10–30 km.
1910 Lombardy tornado	23 July 1910	Lombardy, Italy	1	36 fatalities	A violent long-tracked tornado caused severe damage along a 62 km path north of Milan. The tornado completely destroyed many homes in Busto Arsizio, Solaro, and Saronno, killing 36 people and injuring another 50, becoming one of the most destructive Italian tornadoes.
1912 Brețcu tornado	13 May 1912	Brețcu, Romania	1	17 fatalities	A violent F3 tornado struck the town of Brețcu, destroying 1,548 houses and killing 17 people and injuring another 150.
1913 Plochingen tornado	1 June 1913	Plochingen, Germany	3	40 injuries	A violent F3 tornado struck Echterdingen and Plochingen, traveling for 20 km and injuring 40 people. On the same day, 2 other tornadoes touched down in Germany: 1 F1 in Nürtingen and 1 in the Taunus region.
1913 United Kingdom tornado outbreak	27 October 1913	United Kingdom, Ireland	13+	5 deaths, 150 injuries	The 1913 United Kingdom tornado outbreak occurred on 27 October 1913, mainly in England and Wales. It started off with a deadly F3 tornado that tracked through Dyffryn Dowlais, Llantwit Fardre, Treforest, Cilfynydd, Abercynon, Edwardsville and Bedlinog, killing at least 5 people and injuring over 100. 2 F2 tornadoes struck Bulkeley and Widnes. Other tornadoes were reported in England at Blackpool, Craypole, Peckforton, Oundle, Exeter, Collumpton and Worthing. The final tornado of the outbreak was reported at Witcombe Park, Gloucester at around 17:20 on 28 October. A tornado was reported in Scotland at Crathes and in Ireland at Crosshaven. However, all of these tornadoes were generally weak.: FU / F0 / F1 / F2 / F3 / F4 / F5; 10 / 0 / 0 / 2 / 1 / 0 / 0
1916 Itzgrund tornado	3 January 1916	Itzgrund, Bavaria-Germany	2	1	A long-tracked F3 tornado struck the cities of Itzgrund and Grafenwöhr, traveling for 85 km and killing 1 person and injuring another. On the same day, an F2 tornado struck Greiz.
1916 Wiener Neustadt tornado	10 July 1916	Wiener Neustadt, Vienna, Austria	3	35 fatalities, 328 injured	This F4 tornado was the deadliest and strongest tornado in Austria. More than 150 homes were destroyed along a 20 km path. 2 other tornadoes were confirmed: 1 F2 in Theresienfeld (Austria) and 1 F3 tornado in Saxony (Germany).
1920 Germany tornado outbreak	28–30 June 1920	Schleswig-Holstein, Mecklenburg-Vorpommern, Saxony-Anhalt	9	3 injured	Small outbreak over the northern part of Germany, with 1 F3 tornado that struck Bargteheide, 5 F2 tornadoes that caused 3 injuries and 3 F1 tornadoes.
1923 Solihull tornado	24 October 1923	Solihull, England	1	1 fatality, 7 injured	A strong F1/T3 tornado struck the towns of Shirley and Solihull in England, carving a 3-mile damage path from Burman Road in Shirley to Damson Lane in Elmdon Heath, destroying a barn, killing a man taking shelter inside.
1924 Netherlands tornado outbreak	26 April 1924	Netherlands, Germany	≥4	3 fatalities, 2 injuries	Tornadoes were reported in The Hague, Zoutelande, Arnemuiden, Haamstede, Ellemeet, Hooge Mierde, Lieshout, Dalmsholte, Hemelum, Glimmen and Vlagtwedde in the Netherlands and in Aachen, Germany. Two houses were destroyed and several others substantially damaged.
1924 Pilisvörösvár tornado	13 June 1924	Pilisvörösvár, Hungary	1	6 fatalities, 33 injured	A strong F4 long-tracked tornado killed 6 people near Budapest. The storm traveled for 65 km with a width of up to 500 m. Several villages were razed to the ground and an F5 intensity was suspected, but according to windspeed, was more likely an F4.
1924 Jels tornado	20 July 1924	Jels, Denmark	1	?	The tornado appeared near the Jels and Grønnebæk areas and traveled for 2.7 km. Unknown damage.
1924 Østervrå tornado	9 September 1924	Østervrå, Denmark	1	5 injuries	A strong F2 tornado severely damaged homes. Barns collapsed and large animals were killed. 5 people sustained injuries.
1924 Nice tornado	1 December 1924	Nice, France	1	30 injured	An F3 tornado struck the city of Nice, damaging the city for 4.5 km in a 100 m wide area. 30 people were injured by the storm.
1925 Netherlands tornado outbreak	10–12 August 1925	Netherlands, Germany and Czechoslovakia	5	4 fatalities	A powerful F4 tornado struck the town of Borculo, with several houses destroyed nearly to its foundation walls. The church was also seriously damaged. Another F3 tornado killed 1 and injured another 13 in Uetersen in Germany.
1926 France-Switzerland tornado	12 June 1926	La Chaux-de-Fonds	1	1 fatality, 7 injuries	An F4 tornado that started in France, weakening to F2-F3 (T5-T6) while it traveled over rural areas of Switzerland. In La Chaux-de-Fonds, multiple limestone homes had their roofs completely destroyed and their interior walls fully collapsed. Up to 246 farms were damaged or destroyed, numerous cows and horses killed and many trees were downed or snapped. The tornado had a path width of 300 to 1000 meters and a path length of at least 20 km. The estimated duration of the tornado was 30 minutes. This tornado was never documented by the ESWD.
1927 Netherlands tornado outbreak	1–2 June 1927	Netherlands/Germany	7	8 fatalities	Strong tornadoes over the Netherlands and Germany, with one IF5 tornado in Neede that killed 7 people and another one near Vrees in Germany, where 10 people were injured by an F4 tornado. A strong F3 tornado struck Schepsdorf and Lingen, causing severe damage along a 6 km path, killing 1 person and injuring 17.
1927 Asipovichy tornado	12 June 1927	Belarus	1	1 fatality	At 17:30 local time an F3 tornado crossed the territory of the Staryya Darohi and Asipovichy districts. The tornado destroyed some residences, outbuildings and crops, and left a 250–300 m wide сlearing in the forest. One farmer, who was driving a dray, was tossed into the air along with his horse and load of logs and chips and thrown into the distance. He died two hours later. The tornado threw off a loaded train from the trackbed embankment on the construction site of the Asipovichy-Mahilyow railway line. The observers noted the rotation of the parent cloud. The phenomenon was accompanied by a thunderstorm and torrential rain. The tornado travelled a path of 37 km, with a width between 100 and 200 m.
1927 Austria tornado outbreak	29 September 1927	Austria	3	1 fatality	2 F3 tornadoes caused extensive damage in Sankt Ruprecht an der Raab and Unterrohr. The first tornado destroyed several homes, some also with ground floor walls having collapsed, injuring 10 people over a 20 km path with a width of 1 km. An F1 tornado struck Hirnsdorf, damaging some trees and roofs. The third tornado struck Unterrohr and other towns over a 15 km path, killing a 14-year-old boy who was lifted, thrown down and hit by roof tiles.
1928 Monza tornado	29 August 1928	Monza, Italy	1	8 fatalities	A strong IF2 tornado struck the city of Monza, killing 8 people and injuring about 60 others.
1928 Hostrup tornado	24 November 1928	Denmark	1	?	An F4 tornado erased a farmhouse to the ground and deroofed several other homes. A pump was ripped off the ground and thrown 10 meters.
1930 Montello tornado	24 July 1930	Montello, Veneto, and Friuli in Italy	4	23 fatalities 102+ injured	A tornado family cross the provinces of Treviso and Pordenone. The first tornado started near Castello di Godego and tracked through the small towns of Vallà, Altivole, Montebelluna, Volpago del Montello, and Nervesa, causing catastrophic damage to houses and churches along a path of 35 km. This tornado that was rated IF5 is considered to be the strongest Italian tornado on record, and one of the strongest in European history. The tornado killed 21 people and injured 102. After not much time the second tornado tracked through the southern portions of the town of Sacile causing severe damage and resulting in the deaths of 2 people. After this tornado the supercell responsible putted down two strong tornadoes that tracked some kilometers before dissipating near a large river.
1930 Naples tornado	16 August 1930	Naples, Italy	1	14 fatalities	A strong IF1 tornado struck Naples, causing severe damage, killing 14 and injuring 70 people along a 4 km path.
1931 Birmingham tornado	14 June 1931	United Kingdom	1	1 fatality	A strong F3 tornado struck the suburbs of Birmingham, killing 1 woman and injuring many other people.
1931 Plettenberg tornado	17 June 1931	Germany	2	4 fatalities	A tornado damaged the town of Willertshagen and Plettenberg in North Rhine-Westphalia. 4 people were killed and 80 others were injured.
1931 Lublin tornado	20 July 1931	Poland	1	6 fatalities	A strong F4 (or low F5) tornado struck Lublin and Zemborzyce, killing 6 people and injuring many others along a 20 km path.
1932 Finland tornado outbreak	4 August 1932	Finland	20	1 fatality	An estimated 20 tornadoes struck parts of southern and central Finland in three hours. Two of the tornadoes have been rated F3.
Kalundborg tornado	11 February 1934	Kalundborg, Denmark	1	Unknown	ESWD mentions that an F2 tornado struck Kalundborg.
1934 Finland tornado outbreak	11–15 July 1934	Finland	8	1 fatality	A large tornado outbreak struck north-central Finland over the course of four days, producing several strong tornadoes. An F4-rated tornado impacted Kiuruvesi on July 11 destroying dozens of building and killing one person. It is considered the northmost violent tornado on record.
1934 Kyrenia tornado	17 October 1934	Cyprus	1	3 fatalities	A strong tornado struck the city of Kyrenia, causing the collapse of the church tower and the roof of a school, killing 3 children.
1935 Bezděkov pod Třemšínem tornado	8 April 1935	Bezděkov pod Třemšínem, Czechoslovakia	1	1 fatality	
1935 Polichno tornado	6 September 1935	Polichno, Czechoslovakia	1	1 fatality	F3 tornado.
1936 Düsseldorf tornado	10 January 1936	Germany	2	2 fatalities	An F4 tornado damaged Düsseldorf, causing extensive damage, 2 fatalities and 37 injuries along a 10 km path. On the same day, an F3 tornado struck Hamm (Sieg).
1936 Wiepkenhagen tornado	15 July 1936	Germany	2	?	A violent tornado struck Wiepkenhagen (Mecklenburg-Vorpommern), causing severe damage indicative of F4 intensity.
1937 Mottola tornado	13 September 1937	Apulia – Italy	1	10 injured	A long-tracked F3 tornado caused severe damage to the towns of Mottola, Martina Franca, and in the Monopoli area, traveling for 43 km with severe damage to homes and trees. 10 people were injured.
1937 Lincolnshire tornado	25 October 1937	Lincolnshire – United Kingdom	0	several injured	A strong F3/T7 tornado caused severe damage to the village of South Kelsey, Lincolnshire. Homes had their roofs torn off, and seriously damaged several buildings, including a joiner's shop which suffered near total structural collapse
1938 Nienhagen tornado	8 July 1938	Germany	1	0	A long-tracked F2 tornado caused damage to Nienhagen, Lower Saxony up to Uelzen, traveling for 75 km.
1945 Moscow tornado	2 September 1945	Moscow, Russia	1	Several fatalities	A strong tornado, with a diameter of 50 to 300 meters and a speed of about 60 km/h, traveled for 12–15 kilometers and destroyed two villages near Moscow – Khomutovo and Oboldino. The tornado was accompanied by large hail the size of a chicken egg.
1948 Bavaria tornado outbreak	22 July 1948	Germany	3	5 fatalities	3 tornadoes were confirmed. A strong tornado hit the Nürnberg city area, destroying 40 homes, killing 4 people and injuring 11 others. Another strong tornado caused damage from Auerbach up to Grafenwöhr, killing a 12-year-old boy by falling debris.
Buckinghamshire – Cambridgeshire, England tornadoes	21 May 1950	United Kingdom	4	0	An F2 tornado crossed Britain for 107 km (one of the longest-lived tornadoes in Europe) from Little London (Buckinghamshire) to Coveney (Cambridgeshire). Three other F1 tornadoes were documented on the same day.: FU / F0 / F1 / F2 / F3 / F4 / F5; 0 / 0 / 3 / 1 / 0 / 0 / 0
1950 Borod tornado	23 July 1950	Borod, Germany	1	0	An F2 tornado lasted only a few minutes as it passed the town's outskirts. All the tiles of many houses were torn off, trees were pulled out of the ground and some houses lost their entire roofs, including rafters and boards.
1950 Gelderland–Friesland tornado outbreak	23 August 1950	Gelderland – Friesland, Netherlands	4	0	Almost as strong as 1927 Neede according to the Royal Netherlands Meteorological Institute, causing F4 damage along a 47 km path in Veluwe Forest.
1951 Osterholz-Scharmbeck tornado	11 July 1951	Lower Saxony, Germany	2	0	A strong F3 tornado caused severe damage along a 52 km path from Hude to Gnarrenburg in Lower Saxony.
1951 Khimki tornado	17 August 1951	Khimki, Soviet Union	1	?	A strong and multivortex tornado, accompanied by rain and hail, swept through the Khimki district. The village of Skhodnya suffered the most, where a wooden railway platform was overturned.
16 May 1953 event	16 May 1953	Germany and Denmark	4	0	Tornadoes struck Germany and Denmark. The 2 strongest were rated F2. 1 high-end F2/T5 tornado touched down in the German region of Schleswig-Holstein. A second F2 tornado touched down in Hejls, Denmark. Trees were uprooted or snapped in a forest, homes were deroofed and a chicken barn was picked up and thrown several kilometers into the ocean.: FU / F0 / F1 / F2 / F3 / F4 / F5; 1 / 0 / 1 / 2 / 0 / 0 / 0
1953 Turin tornado	29 May 1953	Turin, Italy	1	5 fatalities	A F1 tornado struck the centre of Turin, causing considerable damage and the collapse of part of the roof of the Mole. 5 people were killed.
1954 Castelo Branco tornado	6 November 1954	Portugal	1	5 fatalities, 220 injuries	A strong F3 tornado struck the town of Castelo Branco, causing extreme damage to the city, killing 5 people and injuring 220 others.
1954 United Kingdom tornado outbreak	8 December 1954	United Kingdom	7	0	7 tornadoes were confirmed that day over England, and in particular over the western parts of the Greater London area, where 3 tornadoes (1 of them caused F3 damage from Gunnersbury to Southgate) were confirmed. In total, there was 1 F3 tornado, 4 F1 tornadoes and 2 F0 tornadoes.: FU / F0 / F1 / F2 / F3 / F4 / F5; 0 / 2 / 4 / 0 / 1 / 0 / 0
1956 Naro-Fominsk tornado outbreak	25 August 1956	Naro-Fominsk-Soviet Union	1	0	A group of long-tracked F2 tornadoes caused severe damage along an 80 km path in a 200–350 m wide area.
1957 Robecco Pavese and Vallescuropasso tornadoes	16 June 1957	Robecco Pavese, Italy	3	6 fatalities, 59 injuries	Two intense tornadoes struck Pavia province in southern Lombardy. The first tornado, an IF3, tracked through the small village of Robecco Pavese and causes severe damage to several houses and injures 28 people. Shortly after a second and more intense tornado struck the village of Vallescuropasso, causing violent damage. This second tornado that was originally rated F4 by ESWD, on December 19, 2025, was upgraded to IF5 making this the third F5/IF5 in Italian history. 6 people died and almost 31 people were injured along a 4 km path.
1958 Rawa Mazowiecka and Nowe Miasto tornado	15–16 May 1958	Rawa Mazowiecka and Nowe Miasto in Poland	2	3 fatalities, >100 injuries	
1960 Rzeszów tornado	20 May 1960	Poland and Ukraine	8	5 fatalities, ≥100 injuries	Tornado outbreak over southern Poland and northern Ukraine with 8 tornadoes. 1 was an F4 tornado that struck the town of Niechobrz, causing the total destruction of some houses and killing 3 people. The tornado may have reached F5 intensity as well. Another 2 victims were recorded in Dynów and Gorliczyna.
1960 United Kingdom tornado outbreak	26–27 August 1960	United Kingdom	13	0	A light tornado outbreak over southern England with 13 tornadoes over a 2-day period. Most of them were at F0/F1 strength. The strongest tornadoes (F1) struck Hornchurch (Greater London) and Poulton, Gloucestershire.
1961 Évreux tornadoes	4 May 1961	France	2	1 fatality and 100 injured	Two powerful F3 tornadoes struck Évreux and Cormeilles. In the city of Évreux, 1 person died and 100 others were injured.
1961 Bavaria tornadoes	14 May 1961	Germany	2	5 injuries	A strong F3 tornado struck Gangkofen and Wurmannsquick, traveling for 22 km and injuring 5 people. A second tornado struck Mitterskirchen and Hirschhorn, traveling for 30 km and producing F2 damage. Both tornadoes caused extensive damage.
1961 Central Europe tornado outbreak	8 August 1961	Germany and Austria	7	1 fatality	All the tornadoes were classified as F1. They caused severe damage near Hamburg, while an F1 tornado struck Innsbruck, producing large hail and killing 1 person.
1961 Giarratana tornado	18 October 1961	Sicily, Italy	1	7 fatalities, 20 injuries	An intense IF3 tornado traveled 40 km on land, from the Mediterranean coast near Punta Braccetto, and struck the western portion of the city of Ragusa and the near comune of Giarratana in the Hyblean Mountains. 7 people were killed and 20 were injured.
1961 Pomezia tornado	30 October 1961	Pomezia, Italy	1	3 fatalities	An F3 tornado traveled 20 km on land near Rome. 25 wooden and brick houses were completely destroyed, six factories were strongly damaged and some concrete houses were completely destroyed. 3 people died and 60 were injured.
1962 Holstebro tornado	11 February 1962	Denmark	1	Unknown Injuries	A powerful high-end F3 tornado struck Holstebro in Denmark, causing devastating damage. More than 100 houses were badly damaged or destroyed, making this event the most devastating tornado in Denmark's history, and the third strongest tornado documented in Denmark. Many injuries were reported, but the number is not exactly known. The tornado traveled 13 km, with a maximum width of 500 meters, while remaining on the ground for 25 minutes. ESWD mentions that F4 intensity may have been reached.
1962 Isla del Moral tornado	27 October 1962	Spain	1	1 fatality	An F1 tornado hit Isla del Moral, killing 1.
1962 Brenes tornado	14 December 1962	Spain	1	3 fatalities, 30 injuries	An F1 tornado hit Brenes, killing 3 and injuring 30 others.
1963 Fårvang tornado	27 August 1963	Denmark	2	Unknown	The day started with a waterspout over the Baltic Sea. A couple hours later, a high-end F3 tornado caused severe damage to 20 homes in Fårvang, Denmark, including a large school. The school partially collapsed and a further two homes collapsed. ESWD mentions that F4 intensity may have been reached.: FU / F0 / F1 / F2 / F3 / F4 / F5; 1 / 0 / 0 / 0 / 1 / 0 / 0
1964 Kirovo-Chepetsk tornado	20 May 1964	Soviet Union	1	0	A long-track tornado struck Kirov Oblast and Udmurtia, travelling for 175 km from Kirovo-Chepetsk to Glazov. It was classified as an F2 tornado.
1964 Lower Saxony tornadoes	15–16 September 1964	Germany	3	?	3 F3 tornadoes struck several villages in Lower Saxony. The first tornado struck on the 15th, killing 1 person and injuring 20 others along a 20 km path from the town of Minden to Stadthagen. The other 2 tornadoes struck Mellendorf and Schessinghausen.
1964 Sicily tornadoes	31 October 1964	Sicily, Italy	2	8 fatalities, 170 injures	Two intense IF3 tornadoes struck the southern and eastern portion of the island. The first one traveled about 10 km from the Mediterranean Sea to the small village of Santa Croce Camerina and kills 5 people. After an hour the second tornado forms in the Piana di Catania and traveled 16 km killing 3 people and injured 100 people. In this tornado several industrial building were heavily damaged and several small Aircraft in the MARISTAELI Military Base and in the Fontanarossa Airport of Catania were destroyed.
1965 Italy tornado outbreak	4–5 July 1965	Italy	4	15 fatalities, 215 injuries	Violent outbreak of tornadoes. The first tornado of the day an IF3 rain-wrapped wedge tornado formed between Cadeo and Roveleto and tracked 30 km and devastate the small town of Busseto. This tornado killed 8 people and injured 61 people. Shortly after another powerful supercell dropped an F4 tornado that devastate the small village of Torricella di Sisa, killing 3 people and injured 46 people. A third supercell dropped another large IF3 wedge tornado in eastern Emilia-Romagna region and killed one person between San Giovanni di Ostellato and Comacchio. At the sunset yet another severe thunderstorm produced another IF3 tornado that tracked 30 km through the Apennine Mountains in southern Piedmont. This final tornado kills 3 people and injures dozens. Overall 15 people were killed and 215 people were injured.
1965 Licata tornado	24 August 1965	Italy	1	3 fatalities, 12 injures	An intense IF3 tornado struck the suburbs of Licata in Sicily killing three people including two boys that were dragged by the powerful vortex.
1966 Czech tornado	18 July 1966	Czechoslovakia	1	8 injuries	F3 tornado.
1967 Western Europe tornado outbreak	24–25 June 1967	France – Netherlands – Belgium – Germany	7	15–20 fatalities, 112 injured	From 24 to 25 June 1967, a violent tornado outbreak struck western Europe. The event started with an unrated tornado which occurred near Jüterbog in eastern Germany at around noon. This was followed by an intense F3 that travelled for 8 km and struck Davenescourt, France during the evening. Shortly after, an F5 struck Palluel, killing 6 and injuring 30, and a violent F4 struck Pommereuil, killing 2 and injuring 50. The next day started with an F2 which travelled 12 km and struck Argoules. It was followed by 3 unrated tornadoes in areas further north, that struck the communities of Boulogne-sur-Mer, Merck-Saint-Liévin and Bergues. Shortly after these tornadoes, an F3 struck Oostmalle in Belgium, damaging homes. Another F3 struck Ulicoten, Chaam and Gilze killing 2. The final tornado of the outbreak was a high-end F3 that struck Nieuwaal, Crob, Deil and Tricht, killing at least 5, although some sources say up to 10 were killed in Tricht.: FU / F0 / F1 / F2 / F3 / F4 / F5; 4 / 0 / 0 / 1 / 4 / 1 / 1
1968 Black Forest tornado	10 July 1968	France and Germany	2	2 fatalities	A long-tracked F3 tornado struck Uberach and other villages in Alsace, causing 3 injuries. The same supercell produced a powerful F4 tornado that struck Ittersbach and Pforzheim (Baden-Württemberg), killing 2 people (one additional person was killed during clean-up efforts) and injuring 300 others.: FU / F0 / F1 / F2 / F3 / F4 / F5; 0 / 0 / 0 / 0 / 1 / 1 / 0
1969 Belarus tornado outbreak	31 May 1969	Belarus	4	0	A powerful tornado outbreak produced 3 F2 and 1 F1 tornadoes across Belarus. The strongest one struck Svetlahorsk (Gomel Region).
1969 Ukraine tornado outbreak	18 August 1969	Ukraine	6	0	A destructive tornado outbreak ripped across Cherkasy Oblast and Kyiv Oblast, Ukraine, producing a series of strong to violent tornadoes. An F4 tornado tore across several villages such as Podibna, Kryvets, Tynovka and Antonovka, leaving behind a 78 km-(48 mi)-path of devastation behind.: FU / F0 / F1 / F2 / F3 / F4 / F5; 0 / 0 / 3 / 0 / 2 / 1 / 0
1969 Nicosia tornadoes	22 December 1969	Cyprus	Several	4 fatalities	Waterspouts (probably tornadic) came ashore.
1970 Soviet Union tornado outbreak	6 July 1970	Soviet Union	6	0	6 long-tracked F1 tornadoes struck 400 km south of Moscow. One of them had a path length of 100 km.
1970 Venice–Padua tornado	11 September 1970	Veneto, Italy	1	36 fatalities	A violent tornado struck the outskirts of Padua and Venice, causing heavy damage and killing 36 people. 21 of the victims were on a ferry on the island of St. Helena when the tornado hit. 12 people died in a campsite in Ca'Savio, where some cars were found more than 200 meters away. The F4 tornado traveled 70 km.
1971 La Rochelle tornado	25 January 1971	France	1	1 fatality	An F4 tornado struck La Rochelle traveling for 2.9 km, causing severe damage in a 50 m wide area. 1 person died and another 12 were injured.
1971 L'Abbaye tornado	18 October 1971	Switzerland	1	0	A powerful F4 tornado struck Bois d'Amont and L'Abbaye, causing severe damage to houses, cars and completely destroying sections of forests. The path of the storm is similar to that of the 1890 F4 tornado.
1971 Kiel tornado	18 October 1971	Germany	1	1 fatality	An F3 tornado struck Kiel, killing 1 person and injuring 13 others.
1972 Ameland Island tornado	11 August 1972	Friesland, Netherlands	–	7 fatalities, 90 injuries	
1973 Northern France tornado outbreak	20 September 1973	France	3	2 fatalities	3 F3 tornadoes struck Fleury-les-Aubray, Sancy-les-Provins and Grainville-Langannerie killing 2 people and injuring 14 others.
1974 Nizhny Novgorod tornado	3 July 1974	Nizhny Novgorod, Russia	1	?	South-east of the village Dubenki, at about 17:00, an F3 tornado suddenly formed. Passing along the Volga River, accompanied by a thunderstorm, rain and hail, the tornado broke the equipment of the weather station "Myza" and traveled to a residential area of a new building in the Prioksky City District. All buildings in the path of the tornado were severely damaged, with the roof of the Annunciation Monastery also torn off. Crossing the Volga, in the port of the Spit of Nizhny Novgorod, the tornado dropped a 240-ton crane into the river, tore off the hatch covers of a cargo steamer standing in the port, and scattered the goods prepared for shipment. Then the whirlwind went into the field and disappeared near Lake Kislenko. After the tornado, a squally wind swept through the city. As a result, a lot of material damage and possibly human casualties occurred.
1978 Seville Airport tornado	27 Dec 1978	Seville, Spain	1	Unknown	The F3 tornado hit the airport in the city of Sevilla. Multiple cars were overturned, and a plane was moved and overturned. 70 vehicles were affected by the tornado. Later, the tornado tore off the roof of a house in which a girl was sleeping. Miraculously, the girl was not hurt.
1979 Christ's Ascension Day outbreak	24 May 1979	Germany	6	3 injured	A major outbreak struck parts of Eastern Germany with one violent F4 tornado near Bad Liebenwerda (Brandenburg) where harvesters were sent flying.
1980 Ukraine tornado outbreak	2 June 1980	Ukraine	4	0	4 tornadoes were confirmed. 3 of them were of F2 strength, while the first tornado was an F1.
Mid-June 1980 Germany tornado outbreak	14–15 June 1980	Central Germany	7	8 fatalities, at least 11 injuries (serious)	Some tornadoes struck the Central German states of Thuringia and Saxony-Anhalt. A campsite was severely damaged with some fatalities. The tornadoes were classified as being of F1-F2 strength.
1981 Širvintos tornado	29 May 1981	Širvintos District, Lithuania	1	1 fatality, 30 injuries	An F2 tornado travelled for 6 km with a path 100–300 m wide. This was the strongest known tornado in Lithuania. One fatality documented.
1981 Moerdijk tornado	6 October 1981	North Brabant, Netherlands	1	17 fatalities	NLM CityHopper Flight 431 encountered a tornado shortly after takeoff and crashed.
1981 United Kingdom tornado outbreak	23 November 1981	United Kingdom	104	8 injuries	Largest known European outbreak, though predominantly weak tornadoes.: FU / F0 / F1 / F2 / F3 / F4 / F5; 21 / 24 / 57 / 2 / 0 / 0 / 0
1982 Levier tornado	2 June 1982	France	1	?	A powerful F4 tornado struck Levier, causing severe damage along a 3 km path.
1982 France–Belgium tornadoes	20 September 1982	France and Belgium	3	7 injured	3 tornadoes were confirmed, 1 F2 and 2 F3s. A strong F3 tornado struck Belgium, injuring 3 people along a 31 km path. Possibly the strongest tornado event in Belgium.
1984 Soviet Union tornado outbreak	9 June 1984	Western Russia	≥8	69–400+ fatalities, 213 injured	The deadliest tornado outbreak in Russia. Two violent tornadoes touched down, both rated F4, in the outbreak that damaged 36 cities and villages, including Tver and Kostroma, in a wide area north of Moscow. Almost three F2 tornadoes were fixed over no-population areas, and an F3 tornado also occurred.
1986 Ojos Negros tornado	23 September 1986	Spain	1	?	An F3 tornado that moved 4 km, damaging a mine, destroying a farm, destroying entire crops, and killing hundreds of livestock. Damages were estimated at €32 million.
1987 Shel'vov tornado	20 July 1987	Ukraine	1	4 fatalities 30 injured	F3 tornado that destroyed the town of Shel'vov.
1988 Italian Alps tornadoes	3 August 1988	Italy	2	12 injuries	Two strong F2 tornadoes struck the Italian Alps during the night hours. The first one struck the town of Edolo, Lombardy and injured 10 people. The second one hit the small village of Ortisei in South Tyrol and causes considerable damage to houses and carpentry and injured 2 people.
1991 Humlebæk tornado	18 May 1991	Humlebæk, Denmark	1	Unknown	ESWD mentions an F2 tornado struck Humlebæk.
1992 Ameland Island tornado	17 August 1992	Friesland, Netherlands	1	1 fatality	
1992 Ciutadella-Ferreries tornado	9 October 1992	Ciutadella-Ferreries, Spain	1	0	The F3 tornado reached wind speeds of 320 km/h. Thousands of trees were destroyed.
1993 Sigüenza tornado	24 May 1993	Sigüenza, Spain	1	0	F2 damage in a path across the town.
1994 Espluga de Francolí tornado	31 August 1994	Espluga de Francolí, Spain	1	0 fatalities, 0 injuries	A tornado struck Espluga de Francolí. The tornado destroyed roofs of houses, high voltage towers, trees and railroad tracks. The tornado was rated F2.
1997 Spijkenisse tornado	7 June 1997	Netherlands	1	0	F1 damage to houses, and trees ripped out from the ground.
1997 Eastern Europe tornado outbreak	23 June 1997	Ukraine, Belarus, and Poland	11	17 fatalities, 50 injuries	As a cold front moved across Eastern Europe, it produced many deadly wedge tornadoes. The tornadoes affected an area from Lublin Voivodship to Lutsk Oblast to the Minsk Region. The outbreak began at 13:00 local time when at least 5 F1s touched down. Many homes would be destroyed and 1 person would die in Łaszczów. Later that day, an F2 touched down in Pidrichchia, Ukraine, killing two. As the storm moved through Ukraine, it is thought 9 more people were killed but it is unsure how many of those deaths were related to tornadoes. Within the span of 20 minutes, 2 tornadoes touched down in Belarus, one in Molodovo, and another in Chatava, both F1s. 3 more F2s touched down across the Minsk Region, one in Krasnahorki, one in Skamaroški, and one that killed 5 people and injured 50 in Rubiaževičy. Overall, the storms killed 17 people, with 50 more being injured.: FU / F0 / F1 / F2 / F3 / F4 / F5; 0 / 0 / 7 / 4 / 0 / 0 / 0
1997 Copenhagen tornado	30 June 1997	Denmark, Germany, Russia	3	Unknown	An F1 tornado struck the capital city of Denmark. Based on the ESWD, the tornado traveled 0.7 km with a maximum width of 60 meters. 1 F1 tornado struck near Ginsheim in Germany, while a landspout tornado touched down in Russia.: FU / F0 / F1 / F2 / F3 / F4 / F5; 1 / 0 / 2 / 0 / 0 / 0 / 0
1998 Selsey tornado	7 January 1998	Selsey, West Sussex, England	1	0	The Selsey tornado was the widest tornado in the UK. The tornado had a maximum width of 900 m where it initially made landfall as a waterspout. Fortunately, no one was hurt as the event occurred slightly before midnight.
1998 Mikkeli tornado	12 June 1998	Finland	1	0	An F3 tornado traveled 10 km, destroying some airport facilities.
1998 Nørager tornado	31 August 1998	Nørager, Denmark	1	Unknown	ESWD mentions that an F2 tornado struck Nørager. The tornado traveled 4 km with a max width of 500 meters.
1999 San Leonardo de Yagüe tornado	1 June 1999	Spain	1	0	F3 damage and thousands of trees uprooted in a forest near Soria, Spain.
1999 Gudar Range tornado	28 August 1999	Sistema Ibérico, Spain	1+	0	F3 tornado in mountainous terrain.
1999 Mosqueruela tornado	28 October 1999	Mosqueruela, Teruel, Spain	1	0	F3 damaged 800,000 pine trees, some were uprooted in a forest. No injuries were found, however, a person was not hit by the miracle for some meters.

== 21st century ==
=== 2000s ===
Event	Date	Area	Tornadoes	Casualties	Notes
2000 Rakvere tornado	15 July 2000	Rakvere, Estonia	1	1 fatality, 1 injury	An F2 tornado struck Rakvere killing 1 person and injuring 1.
2001 Milošovice tornado	31 May 2001	Milošovice, Czech Republic	2	None	F3 tornado
2001 Concorezzo tornado	7 July 2001	Concorezzo, Italy	3	92 injuries	A strong F3 tornado struck Concorezzo and Arcore, causing severe damage and injuring 92 people. A number of houses and warehouses were unroofed and some cars were lofted into the air. 2 other tornadoes (F1 and F2) were recorded on the same day in northern Italy.: FU / F0 / F1 / F2 / F3 / F4 / F5; 0 / 0 / 1 / 1 / 1 / 0 / 0
2001 Catalonia-Southern France tornado outbreak	20 October 2001	Catalonia and Languedoc-Roussillon	6	None	4 F1 tornadoes and one F0 tornado touched down in Spain; One F1 tornado touched down in France.: FU / F0 / F1 / F2 / F3 / F4 / F5; 0 / 1 / 5 / 0 / 0 / 0 / 0
2002 Athens tornado	27 July 2002	Athens, Greece	1	None	Struck near airport.
2002 Southern Romania tornadoes	12 August 2002	Southern Romania	2	3 fatalities, 15 injuries	A strong F3+ tornado, up to 1,000 metres (1,100 yd) wide, struck Făcăeni in southern Romania. 33 houses were destroyed on a 74 km (46 mi) path. The storm killed 3 people and injured 15 others. Another tornado struck near Floreasca.
2003 Cyprus tornado outbreak	27 January 2003	Southern Cyprus	4	1 fatality	Tornadoes and waterspouts; Limassol was hit the worst, with a F2 tornado.
Alcañiz Tornado	23 July 2003	Alcañiz, Teruel, Spain	1	0	An F2/F3 tornado devastated several pine trees, olive trees and other types of trees, breaking them and uprooting them. An industrial estate was heavily damaged, 4 to 5 houses destroyed. Even a tractor was thrown 400 meters away.
2004 Cyprus tornado outbreak	22 January 2004	Cyprus	7+	Multiple injuries	Severe weather outbreak with several F1-2 tornadoes and waterspouts.
2004 Czech Republic tornado outbreak	9 June 2004	Czech Republic	2	None	There were 2 tornadoes in the Czech Republic; the first was probably an F1, the second an F3. The first tornado appeared in Seninka at 14:15 UTC. The second and stronger one appeared only 15 minutes after the first one in Litovel.
2004 Germany tornado outbreak	23 June 2004	Northern and Eastern Germany	6	8 injuries	At least one F1, an F2, and an F3 tornado caused significant damage. The villages of Micheln and Trebbichau in Saxony-Anhalt were heavily impacted by one of the most damaging tornadoes in modern German history.
2004 Finland tornado outbreak	20 August 2004	Finland	3	None	1 F3 (track 10 km) and 2 F1 tornadoes were reported.
2005 Romania tornado outbreak	7 May 2005	Romania	9	None	9 tornadoes touched down in Romania. One of them struck Movilita, causing F1 damage on a 1 kilometre (0.62 mi) path. 2 houses, a church tower, trees and roofs were damaged.
2005 Hajdúbagos-Hosszúpályi tornado	18 May 2005	Hungary	1	None	A registered F2 tornado hit two villages near Debrecen. The tornado touched down in the eastern part of Hajdúbagos and followed an approx. 10 km path through Hosszúpályi. 80% of the forests in the Hajdúság Landscape Protection Area between the two villages were completely destroyed and several houses were damaged.
2005 July Outbreak	25–29 July 2005	United Kingdom, central and eastern Europe	46	63 injured	Widespread tornado outbreak with 46 reports reported to ESWD. The outbreak started off with 9 tornadoes on 25 July, highest being rated F1. Moderate roof damage was reported in Ipatovo, Russia, while another low-end F1 tornado uprooted trees near Großaitingen, Germany. On 26, 5 July tornadoes touched down, one of which caused F2 damage in Yalta, Ukraine. 10 homes reported damaged across a 15 km long path, some of which had their roofs torn entirely off. A bus and lorry was lifted & a bus-stop was smashed. A cow was picked up as well. Another high-end F1 tornado hit Kalsdorf, Austria. On 27, 8 July tornado reports were reported. An F1 tornado caused damage across a 4 km long and a 100 meter wide path in Romaney, Germany, while another F1 tornado downed a bunch of trees. In the Netherlands, 3 F0 tornado caused damage. In Moordrecht, a shed were damaged & 2000 windows on a greenhouse were damaged, while another 6500 m2 large greenhouse complex saw roof damage by another tornado in Noorden. 1000 m2 out of the 6500 m2 were damaged. In Garderen, an F0 tornado twisted tree tops & damaged roofs. Multiple stands on a marketplace was turned upside down. 3 people were injured by flying debris. A second tornado touched down near the town about 30 min later. Rated F1. An F1 tornado caused damage in Plouaret, France. Across its 2.5 km long and 100 meter wide path, the tornado severely damaged 5 roofs. Trees were uprooted, snapped or twisted. A tree about 4 meter high & 25 cm wide were sectioned at the base and found 60 meters away. Sheet metal were tossed over 200 meters and impaled into fields. On 28 July, 12 tornadoes were reported. An IF3 tornado struck suburbs of Birmingham, causing 39 injuries and severe damage. Roofs and walls were torn from homes, cars were flipped, and a school suffered considerable damage. Damage was consistent for 3 miles before becoming more scattered and weaker. On the same day, 2 F0 tornadoes struck Peterborough and Moulton, causing minor damage to trees and roofs. An F2 tornado caused damage near Ivoy-le-Pré in France. Trees were twisted, 2 silos were destroyed as well as hangar. Roofs were ripped off homes as well. In Sagonne, an F1 tornado uprooted Centennial trees & twisted poplars. A flower pot was carried 5 meters up into the air & parts of sheet metal roofs were carried hundred meters away. Another F2 tornado caused damage & 7 injuries in Coulanges-la-Vineuse. Two Unrated tornadoes touched down in Poland. One of them caused 250000 EUR worth of damage. On 29 July, 12 tornadoes were reported. A large F2 tornado caused damage in western Czech Republic across a 21 km long and 1000 meter wide path (1093 yards). Roofs were torn off & trees were severely damaged. An F2 tornado caused damage in Johanngeorgenstadt, Germany, causing 2 injuries while another F2 tornado hit Erlabrunn. Multiple other F2 tornadoes touched down in Germany, as well as an F1 tornado that caused 10 injuries as it hit a campsite. An F2 tornado hit Mitro-Ayupovo in Russia. Many houses was damaged, including one home that collapsed & others who had their roof torn off. Trees & Poles were snapped. Windows were destroyed as well. A Grain-cleaning complex was lifted up and completely destroyed when smashed into the ground. An F2 tornado injured 2 people in Bralin, Poland.: FU / F0 / F1 / F2 / F3 / F4 / F5; 12 / 10 / 12 / 11 / 1 / 0 / 0
2005 Scandinavia tornado & waterspout outbreak	7–8 August 2005	Scandinavia, Central Europe & Ukraine	18	0	A tornado & waterspout outbreak that mainly affected Scandinavia produced 18 tornado reports. In Holbæk, Denmark, a low-end F1/T2 Tornado took a 2 km long path. In Germany, a high-end F0/T1 tornado remained on the ground for 10 minutes, 2 kilometers north of St. Gangloff b. Hermsdorf. A F1 tornado caused moderate damage in Lukashëvka, Ukraine too.: FU / F0 / F1 / F2 / F3 / F4 / F5; 13 / 3 / 2 / 0 / 0 / 0 / 0
2005 Catalonia tornado outbreak	7–8 September 2005	Catalonia, Spain	5	0	1 F2 tornado, 3 F1 tornadoes, 1 F0 tornado and more than 10 waterspouts in 24 hours: FU / F0 / F1 / F2 / F3 / F4 / F5; 0 / 1 / 3 / 1 / 0 / 0 / 0
2006 Hamburg tornado outbreak	27 March 2006	Germany	8	2 fatalities, 2 injuries	8 tornadoes were spotted, two of which were rated F2. One of them struck Hamburg, causing 2 deaths and 2 injuries on a 7 km path. The other tornadoes were F1.
2006 central Europe tornado outbreak	20–21 May 2006	Germany, Poland, Czech Republic and Netherlands	16	0	The outbreak struck the central part of Europe, in particular the central region of Germany, with 16 tornadoes across the region. 5 were F2, 10 F1 and 1 F0. The most powerful hit Westerwiehe (F2); however, the longest path was that of an F1 that lasted for 23 km.: FU / F0 / F1 / F2 / F3 / F4 / F5; 0 / 1 / 10 / 5 / 0 / 0 / 0
2006 Noordwijkerhout tornado	21 May 2006	Noordwijkerhout, Netherlands	1	0	F1-2 tornado causing damage to crops and buildings.
August 2006 UK tornado outbreaks	16–18 August 2006	United Kingdom	4	8 injuries	At least 4 tornadoes.
August 2006 Mainland Europe outbreak	21 August 2006	Western Europe	7+	38 injuries	At least 7 confirmed tornadoes, a further 4 unconfirmed.
2006 Tarragona and Barcelona coast tornado outbreak	13 September 2006	Catalonia, Spain	4	0	3 F1 tornadoes, 1 F0 tornado and more than 5 waterspouts in 24 hours.: FU / F0 / F1 / F2 / F3 / F4 / F5; 0 / 1 / 3 / 0 / 0 / 0 / 0
2006 London tornado	7 December 2006	London, England, UK	1	6 injuries	
2006 Ardmore-Loanends tornado	31 December 2006	Armagh & Antrim, Northern Ireland	1	0	F2 tornado that tracked 30.2 km, the strongest ever to hit Northern Ireland.
Cyclone Kyrill tornado outbreak	17–18 January 2007	Germany, Poland, Czechia, Sweden, and the Netherlands	12	5	The first tornado was an F0 in the Netherlands on the 17th. On the 18th, 11 tornadoes were reported, starting with an unrated tornado in Unnaryd, Sweden. Another unrated tornado later occurred near Steinhude in Germany, where the strongest tornadoes of the outbreak would occur. The community of Brachwitz was hit by an F3 tornado, completely destroying two houses and damaging multiple others. Shortly after, an F2 caused significant vegetation damage near Meseberg, and an F3 struck the city of Wittenberg. Here, houses were severely damaged and cars were thrown. This was followed by an F1 tornado in Silna, Poland and another tornado in Germany. The latter was the strongest of the outbreak, and one of the strongest German tornadoes of the century. It received a rating of high-end F3, although low-end F4 damage might have occurred in some locations. The tornado was long-tracked and completely levelled four houses, damaging many more, as well as partly debranching trees. Two more damaging F2 tornadoes then occurred in Poland near Osiek and Andrespol. Another F2 also occurred in Czechia near Treben. It is possible that more tornadoes occurred with this event, but could not be confirmed.: FU / F0 / F1 / F2 / F3 / F4 / F5; 2 / 1 / 1 / 5 / 3 / 0 / 0
2007 Guidizzolo tornado	9 July 2007	North Italy	3	12 injuries	3 tornadoes formed over Veneto, Lombardia and Piemonte. In Piemonte, a landspout tornado occurred near Vercelli. In Lombardia, a strong F2 struck the village of Guidizzolo, causing severe damage on a 12 km path. In Veneto, an F1 struck Farra D'Alpago, causing some damage to roofs.
2007 central England tornado outbreak	23 September 2007	Central England	6	0	At least 6 tornadoes were reported in Warwickshire, Northamptonshire and the West Midlands. 4 of them were F1 tornadoes.
2008 northern Poland tornadoes	23 February 2008	Northern Poland	3	0	Low pressure system produced 3 tornado reports to ESWD. In Naklo nad Notecia, an F2 damaged some roofs and destroyed a barn. Another strong but unrated tornado was reported near Bydgoszcz. A tornado was also reported in Georgia.: FU / F0 / F1 / F2 / F3 / F4 / F5; 2 / 0 / 0 / 1 / 0 / 0 / 0
2008 Salboro (Padua) tornado	6 July 2008	Padua, Veneto, Italy	1	0	A small F0 tornado that hit an urban area.
2008 Hautmont tornado	3 August 2008	Hautmont, France	1	4 fatalities, 13 injuries	Same outbreak as below; F4 damaged several villages.
2008 northern Netherlands tornado outbreak	3 August 2008	Friesland, Groningen, Netherlands	2 confirmed, 4 reported	0	Same outbreak as above; F2-3 tornadoes caused damage to property.
2008 Poland tornado outbreak	15–16 August 2008	Poland	12	4 fatalities, 100 injured	12 were reported. A strong, multiple vortex F3 (possibly an F4) tore through seven villages, causing severe damage and injuring 15 people. Another F3 touched down near Piłka and struck Rusinowice, Kalina and Herby, killing a woman in Kalina. A third F3 caused severe damage in Blachownia. Near Mykanów, an F2 flipped and lifted a bus, injuring 40. A fourth F3 killed one person in Gorzkowice. Downbursts in Slovakia killed two people. In total, 4 people were killed and about 100 were injured in the outbreak.
2009 Málaga tornado	1 February 2009	Málaga, Spain	1	0 fatalities, 25 injuries	An F2 tornado struck Málaga. The tornado damaged 250–300 homes, 70 company buildings, and 400 vehicles. The tornado reached 215 km/h.
2009 Ilia tornado	March 2009	Ilia, Greece	1	1 fatality, 30 injuries	An F3 tornado travelled through the city center of Ilia for 2 km, killing 2 people.
2009 Krasnozavodsk tornado	3 June 2009	Krasnozavodsk, Russia	1	1 fatality, 185 injuries	An F3 tornado struck the town of Krasnozavodsk, damaging 42 homes. A boy died when a tree fell on him.
2009 northern Italy outbreak	6 June 2009	Piemonte and Veneto, Italy	3	28 injuries	An F0 tornado was reported near Vercelli, Piemonte in the afternoon. At the same time, a supercell produced a strong F3 tornado in Riese Pio X, in the village of Vallà, causing heavy damage, in some parts like an F3/F4 tornado. It travelled for 10.6 km and injured 28 people. The last tornado hit Valvasone, in Friuli, damaging some buildings, cars, trucks and woods, causing damage like an F2 tornado on a 10.5 km path.
2009 Stornoway tornado	29 July 2009	Stornoway, Isle of Lewis, Scotland	1	0	A possible F0/F1 tornado flipped cars, ripped slates and ironwork from houses, uprooted trees and smashed windows. A thrown car narrowly missed a fuel depot near the ferry terminal. Lightning cut electricity at around 10pm for half an hour.
2009 Nicosia tornado	19 September 2009	Nicosia, Cyprus	1	17+ injuries	10 homes with serious damage.

=== 2010s ===
Event	Date	Area	Tornadoes	Casualties	Notes
2010 Chalkidiki tornado	12 February 2010	Northern Greece	1	0	F2 tornado.
2010 White Monday outbreak	24 May 2010	Eastern Germany	4 confirmed	1 fatality, 38 injuries	An F1, an F2 and an F2+ (possibly F3) caused massive destruction in the States of Saxony, Saxony-Anhalt and Brandenburg, with at least €250 million in damages and one fatality.
2010 Lichtenvoorde – Vragender – Winterswijk tornado	12 July 2010	Netherlands	1	6 injuries	A tornado destroyed the church tower in Vragender and the Zwarte Cross Festival area in Lichtenvoorde. Damage was F2-3, uncertainty about nature of winds, some sources cite a strong derecho as cause of damage.
2010 Veneto tornado outbreak	23 July 2010	Veneto, Italy	3	1 fatality, some injuries	3 tornadoes hit near the cities of Venice, Padua and Vicenza; strong thunderstorms with downbursts in other places. A man was killed near Verona.
2010 Hungary tornado outbreak	14–16 August 2010	Hungary	4 confirmed	0	On 14 August, late in the evening, a supercell reached the western edge of Hungary from Slovenia, which produce a tornado in the vicinity of Velemér and Szentgyörgyvölgy (it is possible that it has already developed in the Slovenian territory). Due to the nighttime, no eye-witness observation was available about the tornado itself, but it was reported some days later by a local forestry organisation as an online news. A damage survey about 2 week later confirmed the occurrence of the tornado, which mostly affected the old, protected forest NE of Velemér, but some damages were visible in the village also. On 16 August, 3 tornadoes developed on the eastern half of the country, 2 of them likely F2; the villages where tornadoes were reported were Mezőkövesd, Diósjenő, and Felsőtárkány.
2010 Germany tornado outbreak	22–30 August 2010	Germany	17	0	An F3 tornado in Lumda and an F2 tornado in Neppermin caused damages of about €5 million.: FU / F0 / F1 / F2 / F3 / F4 / F5; 0 / 1 / 2 / 1 / 1 / 0 / 0
Portugal	7 December 2010	Portugal	1	0 fatalities, >40 injuries	A long track, long-lived F3 tornado caused significant damage northeast of Lisbon.
2011 northern Sweden tornado outbreak	4 June 2011	Northern Sweden	?	At least 3 injuries	Several tornadoes reported in the provinces of Ångermanland, Västerbotten, and Norrbotten in northern Sweden.
2011 Lithuania tornado	27 July 2011	Northern Lithuania	1 confirmed	0	An F2 tornado formed near the town of Radviliškis, the strongest since 1981.
2011 Sachsen – Anhalt tornadoes	11 September 2011	Germany	2	0	2 F1 tornadoes confirmed.
2011 England and Wales tornadoes	29 November 2011	England and Wales, UK	1 F0, 2 F1 tornadoes	1 injured	One tornado in Greater Manchester, England, and another in Anglesey, Wales. Later that day, a F1 tornado struck north of Breighton.
2011 Vierlingsbeek/Overloon tornado	10 May 2012	Netherlands	F0	No casualties reported	Tornado (partly rainwrapped, probably multi-vortex) damage to property and crops.
2012 Venice tornado	12 June 2012	Veneto, Italy	Likely an F2 tornado	No casualties reported	A tornado hit the eastern isles of Venice, notably Lido, Sant'Elena and Sant'Erasmo, and the nearby town of Treporti, with damage to houses, boats, cars/lorries and trees.
2012 UK Midlands tornadoes	28 June 2012	United Kingdom	3+	At least 2 fatalities	Three supercells affected England and Wales. Two of them formed over the Midlands, producing hailstones reported to be larger than golf balls, with conglomerate stones up to 10 cm across. Burbage in Leicestershire saw some of the most severe hail. At least three F2 tornadoes were sighted, causing damage to houses, uprooting trees and flipping over vehicles; one in rural Derbyshire, another in rural Leicestershire, and another near Sleaford, in Lincolnshire.
2012 French tornadoes	7 July 2012	France	4	0	4 tornadoes reported in France, 2 of which were F0 and 2 of which were F1.
2012 northern Poland tornado outbreak	14 July 2012	Poland	3	1 fatality, 10 injuries	3 tornadoes hit northern Poland. Severe damages to houses and infrastructure. 400 ha of forests was destroyed. Two F3 tornadoes are confirmed.: FU / F0 / F1 / F2 / F3 / F4 / F5; 0 / 0 / 1 / 0 / 2 / 0 / 0
2012 Gandia tornado	28 September 2012	Spain	1	35 injuries	An F1 tornado hit a fairground and flattened a ferris wheel.
2012 Algarve tornadoes	16 November 2012	Algarve in Portugal	F2 tornado plus an F0	1 fatality, 13 injuries	Two tornadoes hit the coast of the Algarve about 10 km from one another. The strongest of the two hit Silves and Lagoa and was classified by the Portuguese national weather service as F2. The weakest, almost certainly an F0, hit Alvor.
2012 Taranto tornado	27–29 November 2012	Italy Greece	6	1 fatality, 42 injuries	A tornado struck Rosignano Marittimo on the 27th, causing F1 damage. On the 28th, a huge wedge F3 tornado struck Taranto, Statte and Crispiano with a path of 23 km, causing 1 fatality and 42 injuries, and serious damage to ILVA of Taranto. On the 29th 4 tornadoes struck Greece, one of these causing F2 damage and the other like an F1.: FU / F0 / F1 / F2 / F3 / F4 / F5; 0 / 0 / 4 / 1 / 1 / 0 / 0
2013 Emilia tornado outbreak	3 May 2013	Italy	3	13 injuries	3 tornadoes were reported. The first touched down near Modena and hit Castelfranco Emilia, causing F2-F3 damage. It travelled for 18.8 km. The second tornado hit the village of San Martino Spino, near Mirandola (the same region hit by the Emilia earthquakes of 2012), causing F2 damage and injuring 1. The last tornado hit Argelato, San Giorgio in Piano and Bentivoglio near Bologna, causing F3 damage on a 25 km path and injuring 12 people.
2013 Krnov tornado	18 June 2013	Krnov, Czech Republic	1	8 injuries	F2 tornado
2013 southern Europe outbreak	28–29 July 2013	France, Germany and Italy	6	15 injuries	On the 28th, 2 tornadoes struck France and Germany; the first one injured 1 person and was classified as an F2. On the 29th, 4 tornadoes struck northern Italy, one of which caused strong F2 damage in Grezzago and Trezzo sull'Adda, with €15,000,000 in damages and 12 injuries.
2013 central Europe tornado outbreak	18–19 August 2013	Germany, Belgium, Netherlands and Norway	5	27 injuries	Some F0 tornadoes over Belgium, 1 F1 in Norway and an F2 tornado in Germany on the 19th, which injured 27 people in a campsite.
2014 northern France outbreak	25 January 2014	United Kingdom, France and Belgium	12	3 injuries	10 F1 tornadoes and 1 F2 tornado were confirmed on that day across the United Kingdom (7), France (3) and Belgium (2). A strong F1 struck the town of Nuneaton, seriously damaging 5 houses, then an F2 tornado struck the cities of Reke, Halluin and Rekkem, with a path of 12.8 km, injuring 3 people and damaging several buildings.
2014 Nonantola tornado	30 April 2014	Italy	1	5 injuries	1 tornado was confirmed near Modena and two funnel clouds were reported, one of which probably touched the ground near Minerbio, the same region hit by the tornadoes of 2013. The tornado that hit Nonantola was likely an F2 that travelled for 14 km and injured 5 people in the industrial area.
2014 Pentecost weekend storms in Europe	7–11 June 2014	Spain, Germany	4	0	Major severe weather outbreak in western Europe, including four tornadoes. An F1 struck Ribeira, Spain, and three more tornadoes occurred in Germany, most notably an F2 which devastated a forest in the state of Mecklenburg-Vorpommern. The other two cases were rated F1.: FU / F0 / F1 / F2 / F3 / F4 / F5; 0 / 0 / 3 / 1 / 0 / 0 / 0
2014 southern Russia tornado outbreak	10–15 June 2014	Russia	13	0	Tornado activity started on 10 June with an F1 which caused slight damage in Konopat. On the following day, an F0 tornado occurred in Kidyshevkiy, followed by another F0 near Nizhneustselemovo and a strong F2 in the village of Yuldashevo, the latter being the strongest tornado of the outbreak. It caused roof damage and uprooted or snapped trees, one house was reportedly completely destroyed. Three more F0 tornadoes occurred in the communities of Mrakovo, Ivano-Shamshevo and Oktyabr'skoye. An F1 tornado hit the village of Asavdy the following day, causing slight damage, and another tornado was reported near Terema, but did not receive a rating. The outbreak ended on 14–15 June with four more F0 tornadoes in Makan, Krasnogor'ye, Dubovka and Khutor Obrez.: FU / F0 / F1 / F2 / F3 / F4 / F5; 1 / 9 / 2 / 1 / 0 / 0 / 0
2014 northern France tornado outbreak	10 August 2014	United Kingdom, France, Belgium, Netherlands and Germany	16	5 injuries	16 tornadoes struck France, United Kingdom, Belgium, Netherlands, and Germany. A long track tornado struck Achicourt in France, travelling 43 km, while 2 F2 tornadoes struck the Netherlands and Germany, causing serious damage. There were 5 injuries in total, 4 in Belgium and one in United Kingdom.: FU / F0 / F1 / F2 / F3 / F4 / F5; 0 / 6 / 8 / 2 / 0 / 0 / 0
2014 Kariyevo tornado	29 August 2014	Bashkortostan	1	2 fatalities, 76 injured	A wedge F3 tornado struck Kariyevo and Janaul with a total path of 45 km. The storm killed 2 people and injured 76.
2014 Catania tornado	5 November 2014	Sicily, Italy	2	0	A strong F1 tornado struck Ognina (northern area of Catania), causing severe damage. Another strong F1 tornado struck the centre of Acireale approximately one hour later.: FU / F0 / F1 / F2 / F3 / F4 / F5; 0 / 0 / 2 / 0 / 0 / 0 / 0
2014 Apulia tornado outbreak	12 November 2014	Apulia, Italy	4	0	A small tornado outbreak struck the Apulia region. One F2 tornado struck Monacizzo, causing major damage. 2 other F1 tornadoes struck Carosino and Ginosa Marina, while an F0 waterspout struck Gallipoli.
2014 Torremolinos tornado	27 November 2014	Torremolinos, Spain	1	0	A small waterspout formed in the sea. Later, it entered and struck Torremolinos, El Olivar and Churriana, damaging the coast promenade, the roof of BP gas station and a car wash located near the airport, a wall of a house collapsed, some vehicles suffered moderate damage, also lots of trees were leveled. It was classified as an F1 tornado, with windspeeds between 140 and 180 km/h.: FU / F0 / F1 / F2 / F3 / F4 / F5; 0 / 0 / 1 / 0 / 0 / 0 / 0
2015 northern Germany tornado outbreak	5 May 2015	northern Germany, Netherlands	7	1 fatality, at least 37 injured	A QLCS struck northern Germany, producing severe wind gusts and tornadoes. The first tornado of the day touched down in the city of Lübeck, but did not receive a rating. Another unrated tornado occurred shortly after near Neu Kaliß. It was followed by two simultaneously occurring tornadoes, one F1 and one F2. The F2 tornado caused severe damage in Groß Laasch and a nearby forest. Especially the train station was hard hit, with the main building partly collapsing. Then, an embedded supercell formed within the QLCS, responsible for at least 3 tornadoes. First, a weak F1 occurred in Brüel, causing some damage. The storm then produced a large, intense high-end F3 wedge tornado that struck the town of Bützow. Major damage occurred in the town and at least 30 people, including the mayor were injured by flying debris. A car with the driver still inside was thrown over a distance of 70 meters. After the destructive wedge tornado lifted, the parent storm produced one last F1 tornado near Woland, damaging a forest. Widespread damaging winds also occurred in northern Germany and the Netherlands in connection with the QLCS. A man was killed in Hamburg after being hit by flying debris, 7 more were injured in Amsterdam.: FU / F0 / F1 / F2 / F3 / F4 / F5; 2 / 0 / 3 / 1 / 1 / 0 / 0
2015 south-central Germany tornado outbreak	12–13 May 2015	south-central Germany, France	at least 8	0	Just one week after a tornado outbreak hit northern Germany, strong supercells hit the central and southern parts of the country. The event started with an F1 that struck Arfurt in Germany, causing vegetation damage. It was followed by a strong F2 tornado in Kirchgandern, severely damaging roofs and trees in town. Shortly after, another F1 caused minor damage in the municipality of Nohra. The last tornado on 12 May was an F0 near Alten. The following day began with an F2 in France, the only confirmed tornado from this event outside of Germany. It struck the community of Gerbépal at F2 strength, damaging houses, cars and forested areas nearby. An unrated but likely strong tornado occurred in the Black Forest, where it moved down a wide swath of forest, but not hitting any buildings. The parent supercell then dropped another tornado, the strongest of the outbreak. Along its 16 km long track, it mostly affected uninhabited areas, where it cut wide paths into the forests. Trees were torn out of the ground, some debranched and partly debarked in the worst hit areas. Several large metal truss transmission towers were blown down and mangled, and nearby farm fields were scoured. The tornado hit the far southern edge of Bonndorf, where one house sustained severe roof damage and two box vans were blown over. Before dissipating, it partly destroyed an old farmhouse. This tornado was given a rating of high-end F3. One more F3 occurred later in Affing near Augsburg, where multiple homes sustained severe damage within a narrow path, and some cars were flipped and thrown short distances.: FU / F0 / F1 / F2 / F3 / F4 / F5; 1 / 1 / 2 / 2 / 2 / 0 / 0
2015 Ohausen bei Freystadt tornado	29 May 2015	Oberfranken, Bavaria, Germany	1	0	One F1 tornado which caused severe damage to buildings.
2015 Riviera del Brenta tornado	8 July 2015	Veneto, Italy	1	1 fatality, 72 injured	One F4 tornado struck a small area among the towns of Pianiga, Dolo and Mira, with heavy damage and several casualties; the area is inside the well-known Riviera del Brenta, famous for its villas and channels. About 500 buildings were badly damaged or destroyed, among them the Villa Fini from the 17th century, which was razed to the ground.
2015 North Holland tornado outbreak	24 August 2015	The Netherlands	2	0	A supercell formed above Belgium going north passing Amsterdam, where an F0 crossed streets where people were shopping, later on, around Hoorn, 3 funnel clouds were reported. After another 25 km, a tornado formed above farmland, destroying a farm with F4 damage; no animals or humans were injured.
2015 Sonnac tornado	16 September 2015	Sonnac, France	5	1 injured	A long track F2 tornado struck many villages in France on a 70,2 km path. In Sonnac, some houses were badly damaged. On the same day, 4 other tornadoes struck in Belgium and Luxembourg, where a person was injured.: FU / F0 / F1 / F2 / F3 / F4 / F5; 0 / 0 / 3 / 2 / 0 / 0 / 0
2015 Athens & Central Greece & Peloponnese tornado outbreak	21–22 October 2015	Athens, Greece	4	5 injuries	A severe and violent storm hit Athens, Greece, causing 4 tornadoes. A big large EF1 tornado touched down near Tourkovounia, in the heart of Attica, passed over the northern parts of Athens (Marousi, Psyhiko), causing damages and injuring a few people for 20 minutes. Afterwards, a second tornado touched down in Parnitha, in the western part of Athens and another 2 in the southern part. One day before in Lecheon Corinth a devastating F2 tornado causes damage in the local area within winds of 100 mph.: FU / F0 / F1 / F2 / F3 / F4 / F5; 0 / 2 / 2 / 1 / 0 / 0 / 0
2016 Russia tornado outbreak	14 May 2016	southwestern Russia	8	5 injuries	A long track F3 tornado struck many villages in Rostov Oblast on a 56 km path, injuring 5 people. Other tornadoes were reported, but most of them remained on an open field.: FU / F0 / F1 / F2 / F3 / F4 / F5; 0 / 4 / 2 / 1 / 1 / 0 / 0
2016 Syktvykar tornado	24 August 2016	Russia	1	0	One F1 tornado over Syktyvkar. Some industrial zones were damaged. No fatalities or injured people.
Eastern Liguria major downburst event	14 October 2016	Italy	1	0	Major downburst event that occurred on 14 October 2016 over eastern Liguria in Italy. This downburst affected an area that was 30 km long and 10 km wide, producing observed wind gusts of 40 m/s, with major impacts to railways, trees, and houses, with more than 2.5 million euros in damages.
The Netherlands tornado outbreak	18 October 2016	The Netherlands	4	0	A cold front came from England passing the Netherlands in the morning. An F2 tornado destroyed an old windmill in Oostzaan and caused some damage in Zaandam and at an Avia gas station. An F1 destroyed multiple houses and greenhouses in Winkel. Barneveld was hit by another F1 tornado, crossing mostly farmland and some trees. A F0 was on the ground for 600 meters, 2 km west of the Oostzaan tornado on farm land, but quickly disappeared before hitting a farm.
2016 Rome tornado	6 November 2016	Italy	1	2 fatalities	One F2 wedge tornado over Ladispoli and Cesano travelled for 41 km north of Rome, with damage in the 2 cities and in the countryside. 2 people were killed by the storm and 20 others were injured. The tornado may have even strengthened to F3.
2017 Székesfehérvár tornado	15 May 2017	Hungary	1	0	One F0 tornado, lasting about 20 minutes.
Early-June 2017 Ural tornado outbreak	3 June 2017	Russia	28	0	On 3 June, an unusual outbreak of tornadoes affected the Ural region of Russia, which is typically not prone to tornado activity. Most of the tornadoes only caused tree damage in this sparsely populated and heavily forested area, though the town of Staroutkinsk sustained a direct hit from an F2 tornado, where dozens of homes were significantly damaged and numerous trees were snapped in forests outside of town. The strongest tornado of the outbreak was a large F3 wedge tornado that passed near Visim, flattening a massive swath of trees in a convergent pattern. Numerous weak also caused tree damage in other unpopulated wooded areas. A total of 28 tornadoes were confirmed as a result of this outbreak, none of which caused any injuries or fatalities.: FU / F0 / F1 / F2 / F3 / F4 / F5; 0 / 8 / 17 / 2 / 1 / 0 / 0
Mid-June 2017 Ural tornado outbreak	18 June 2017	Russia	16	1 fatality, 14 injuries	On 18 June, the Ural region of Russia was affected by a significant tornado outbreak for the second time in one month. Two separate F2 tornadoes moved through dense forest near Novotroitskoye and Zavodoukovsk, snapping or uprooted numerous trees along their paths. Another large, multiple-vortex F2 tornado downed numerous trees and damaged multiple homes in the Baksary area as well. The most intense tornado of the outbreak was a violent F4 that struck the rural community of Maloye Pes'yanovo, where several homes sustained major damage, four well-built log homes were completely leveled, and several others were injured. Vehicles were damaged, and numerous trees were snapped or denuded along the path, some of which sustained severe debarking. The Maloye Pes'yanovo tornado was the first confirmed violent (F4+) tornado in Russia since 1984. Multiple other weak tornadoes were confirmed across the Ural region and other areas of Russia, including a tornado of unknown intensity that struck Tsentral'noye, where trees were snapped and homes sustained roof damage. A total of 16 tornadoes were confirmed.: FU / F0 / F1 / F2 / F3 / F4 / F5; 4 / 4 / 4 / 3 / 0 / 1 / 0
2017 Vienna tornado	10 July 2017	Vienna, Austria	1	0	One F1 stovepipe tornado formed on a severe isolated supercell near Vienna. The storm was accompanied by fist-sized hailstones that damaged huge swaths of agricultural land, causing a total damage of 15 million euros. This is the second highest damage in a storm in Austria. No injuries or fatalities.
August 2017 Western Russia tornado outbreak	2–4 August 2017	Russia	56	Unknown	An extremely rare tornado outbreak occurred in Russia from August 2–4, 2017. According to the European Severe Weather Database, most of these tornadoes were discovered through analysis of Sentinel-2 satellite imagery due to their occurrence over forested and sparsely populated areas. On August 2 alone, 51 tornadoes were identified in a swath stretching from the border with Belarus and Lithuania to the vicinity of Tver. An additional 5 tornadoes, including two rated IF2, occurred on August 4. Individual tornadoes were originally rated on the retired Fujita scale, but for consistency and clarity, they are presented here using the International Fujita (IF) scale.: IFU / IF0 / IF0.5 / IF1 / IF1.5 / IF2 / IF2.5 / IF3 / IF4 / IF5; 2 / 4 / 1 / 33 / 7 / 9 / 0 / 0 / 0 / 0
2017 Bohuslavice tornado	11 August 2017	Bohuslavice, Czech Republic	1	0	F2-F3 tornado, no injuries or fatalities.
2018 western France tornado outbreak	1 January 2018	France	4	0	4 tornadoes were reported in the western regions of France. The first tornado touched down near Bouin, in the Pays de la Loire region, causing F2 damage. Second weak and brief F0 tornado hit Saint-Paul-Mont-Penit, region Pays de la Loire. A third F1 tornado, with a path of damage of more than 5 km, hit the Macau area, in the Nouvelle-Aquitaine region. And The last F2 tornado hit Aize, region Centre-Val de Loire: FU / F0 / F1 / F2 / F3 / F4 / F5; 0 / 1 / 1 / 2 / 0 / 0 / 0
2018 Värnamo tornado	27 April 2018	Värnamo, Sweden	1	0	An IF1/F1 tornado hit the industrial districts of Värnamo, along a 0.65 km long & 10 meter wide path. Multiple shoppingcentres sustained roof loss. A Commercial building lost some tiles. An un-anchored flag pole, connected to a concrete block was thrown 10 meters, landing on a nearby street. A shopping cart corral was thrown several meters. A vehicle was moved against a fence & A weak shed at a school was destroyed too. It is mentioned that it's possible it had IF2/F2 intensity.
10–11 May event	10–11 May 2018	Czech Republic, Sweden	2	0	A small F0 tornado formed near the town of Klatovy, Czech Republic. Only minor damage on one farm. No injuries or fatalities. The day after, an IF2/F2 tornado touched down in Vårdsberg, Sweden, snapping & uprooting Spruce trees at a forest edge: FU / F0 / F1 / F2 / F3 / F4 / F5; 0 / 1 / 0 / 1 / 0 / 0 / 0
2018 Viersen tornado	16 May 2018	Viersen, Germany	1	2 injuries	An F2 tornado struck Viersen-Boisheim, Germany, damaging the roofs of several houses and felling trees on its way through a forest.
Storm Adrian tornado outbreak	28–29 October 2018	Spain, Italy, France	15	2 deaths	This large outbreak of waterspouts and tornadoes is related to Storm Adrian. The outbreak started with two waterspousts in Balearic islands one of this made landfall as an F1 tornado. During the night hours of 28 to 29 a series of powerful thunderstorm made landfall in Sardinia and Corsica producing six different tornadoes 3 of these reached F2 intensity and one particularly between Sindia and Macomer stayed on the ground for 30 km. At the same time another thunderstorm produced an F1 in southern France. The most destructive phase of the outbreak began when a long squall line extend from Liguria to Calabria. This squall line produced several tornadoes including a destructive F2 that made landfall in Terracina causing severe damage to homes and trees, killing 2 people and injured 9 others. The last tornado of the outbreak appened in Apulia and reached F1 intensity. Overall this outbreak produced 8 F1 tornadoes and 5 F2.
2018 Southern Italy tornado outbreaks	20–25 November 2018	southern Italy	10	4 injuries	Two different outbreaks; the first produced three tornadoes, an F2 around Cutro, in the Calabria region, that destroyed several stone farm buildings, an F1 around Taurisano, in Apulia, and a large waterspout that made landfall on Salerno on the 20th. After a weak F0 touched down in Aquileia in northern Italy on the 24th, a larger outbreak struck southern Italy on the 25th. Six tornadoes struck again in Calabria and Apulia, with three F1s around Cropani, Cutro and Rocca di Neto, as well as an F2 around Crotone, all in the Calabria region, that caused very severe damage to industrial structures, and a long tracked F2 that struck far southeastern Apulia together with a brief F0 around San Pancrazio Salentino.: FU / F0 / F1 / F2 / F3 / F4 / F5; 0 / 3 / 4 / 3 / 0 / 0 / 0
2019 Roetgen tornado	13 March 2019	Roetgen, Germany	1	5 injuries	An F3 tornado struck Roetgen, Germany. Several homes suffered major roof damage and damage was also noted in a nearby forest. The path of this tornado was up to 630 m (2,070 ft) wide and 15 km long,
2019 Călăraşi tornado	30 April 2019	Călăraşi, Romania	1	12 injuries	An F2 tornado damaged 16 buildings. Strong winds overturned a passenger bus, injuring 12.
2019 southern Poland tornado outbreak	20–22 May 2019	Poland and Germany	13	2 injuries	Small tornado outbreak that mainly struck southern Poland. In Germany, 2 tornadoes were reported, one in Saxony, near Dresden, and one in Bavaria. On the 21st, 8 tornadoes touched down in Poland, one of them reaching F2 intensity, just west of Lublin. Another 2 tornadoes touched down in the countryside near Radom. On the 22nd, a brief landspout tornado struck the countryside north of Poznan. 2 people were killed by flash floods or floods caused by heavy rain, one in Ukraine and one in Germany. A lightning strike injured 2 in Germany.
2019 Debrecen tornado	29 May 2019	Debrecen, Hungary	1	0	A small tornado touched down in the outskirts of Debrecen next to the airport. Possibly an F1.
2019 Åbenrå tornado	14 June 2019	Åbenrå, Denmark	3	0	Two tornadoes touched down near the Danish and German border. 1 high-end F1 tornado touched down in Kruså. Trees were downed and a garage collapsed. In åbenrå, An F2 tornado flipped vehicles on the hospital's parking lot. Officially rated as a high-end F0, but was upgraded to a low-end F2/T4 by the ESWD based on vehicle damage. A third unrated tornado touched down near Skælskør, Denmark.: FU / F0 / F1 / F2 / F3 / F4 / F5; 1 / 0 / 1 / 1 / 0 / 0 / 0
2019 Eastern Europe tornado outbreak	10 July 2019	Italy, Poland, Russia	10	0 killed, 3 injured	A tornado outbreak which mainly affected Italy produced several tornadoes. An F1 tornado hit Milano Marittima, downing trees, some of which landed on buildings and cars. 3 people were injured. An F0 Tornado hit Torre a Mare. A boat was picked up and thrown. In Poland, a high-end F0 tornado damaged a forest near Zofiówka, a hamlet of Czołczyn. An unrated but strong tornado hit Kushva in Russia. Roofs were destroyed and thrown. Trees were uprooted or snapped. In addition, a severe windstorm claimed several lives in Greece.: FU / F0 / F1 / F2 / F3 / F4 / F5; 5 / 4 / 1 / 0 / 0 / 0 / 0
2019 Germany tornado outbreak	12 July 2019	Hesse, Brandenburg, Rhineland	3	1 injured	An F1 hit Naunheim and caused damage on a 0.9 km long and 30m wide path. Later that day, another F1 hit Bobenheim, causing major damage and injuring at least one person on its 4.5 km long and up to 150 m wide path. Another tornado touched down in Wuschewier and caused no known damage. All tornadoes were recorded and photographed.
2019 Luxembourg/Netherlands outbreak	9 August 2019	Luxembourg, Netherlands	3	19 injuries	An F2 hit the municipalities of Bascharage, Pétange, and the surrounding areas at 17:30. Amsterdam was hit by an F1. ESWD mentions that it produced another F1 tornado in the Netherlands.: FU / F0 / F1 / F2 / F3 / F4 / F5; 0 / 0 / 2 / 1 / 0 / 0 / 0
2019 Germany tornado outbreak	28–29 September 2019	Lower Saxony & Schleswig Holstein	4	0	Tornadoes recorded and / or photographed in Dagebüll (F0), Herrenkoog (FU), Burhafe (FU) & Beesten (F1).: FU / F0 / F1 / F2 / F3 / F4 / F5; 2 / 1 / 1 / 0 / 0 / 0 / 0

=== 2020s ===
Event	Date	Area	Tornadoes	Casualties	Notes
May 2020 Denmark outbreak	2 May 2020	Denmark, Croatia, Kazakhstan	6	0	A small outbreak that mainly affected Denmark produced several confirmed tornadoes across the continent. 4 F0 tornadoes occurred across the northern region of Zealand in Denmark with no damage reported. A waterspout was observed in Croatia & a low-end IF2/F2 tornado hit Akkoyly in Kazakhstan. Brick barns were blown down, walls of homes collapsed & concrete poles were snapped. Some roofs sustained minor damage: FU / F0 / F1 / F2 / F3 / F4 / F5; 1 / 4 / 0 / 1 / 0 / 0 / 0
June 2020 storm complex	7–8 June 2020	Poland, Russia, France, Lithuania, Italy	15	0	A small 2 day outbreak of 15 tornadoes occurred between 7 and 8 June 2020. On 7 June, 9 tornadoes occurred in Poland, Russia & France. A brief but strong low-end F2/T4 tornado hit the village of Kaniów in Poland, damaging 23 homes along a 1.8 km long & 85 meter wide path. Several tornadoes struck the Russian region of Kemerovo, causing mainly damage within several forests, one of which tracked through Yerunakovo, damaging roofs, including one that was heavily damaged. 2 waterspouts was observed in France. On 8, 6 June tornadoes occurred in Russia, Lithuania & Italy, 5 of which were rated F0. An unrated tornado caused damage in Lukšiai, Lithuania. 2 landspouts was observed in Russia, while a third landspout was observed in Italy.: FU / F0 / F1 / F2 / F3 / F4 / F5; 3 / 5 / 5 / 2 / 0 / 0 / 0
2020 Makiivka tornado	13 June 2020	Makiivka, Ukraine	1	0	A small but damaging tornado in the Ukrainian city of Makiivka. A few buildings were damaged.
2020 Ustronie Morskie tornado	10 July 2020	Ustronie Morskie, Poland	1	6 injured	The tornado hit several summer houses, injuring six people, including one child. In total, 8 homes were damaged.
2020 Lotoshino tornado	15 July 2020	Lotoshinsky District, Russia	1	0	On the afternoon of 15 July, a tornado occurred near the village of Dora, which is part of the village of Lotoshino near Moscow. The tornado passed at a distance from the settlement; no one was injured. It lasted about five minutes.
2020 Northampton tornado	25 July 2020	Northampton, United Kingdom	1	0	An F1 tornado damaged multiple roofs, took down electricity cables and flipped trampolines.
2020 north and central Italy tornado outbreak	29–30 August 2020	Veneto, Lazio and Liguria, Italy	4	2 injuries	Strong storms struck north and central Italy, producing 4 tornadoes, one F1 in the countryside south of Verona, one F0 in Genoa, another F0 outside Maniago and one strong F2 on 30 August that struck north of Viterbo, damaging some houses, trees, power lines and slightly injuring 2 people. A severe downburst struck areas in northern Italy, damaging crops and entire cities, and causing severe damage and some injuries.: FU / F0 / F1 / F2 / F3 / F4 / F5; 0 / 2 / 1 / 1 / 0 / 0 / 0
Subtropical Storm Alpha tornado outbreak	18 September 2020	Portugal	2	0	Supercellular thunderstorms produced by the associated low of Subtropical Storm Alpha moved across Portugal, spawning two confirmed tornadoes in Beja and Palmela. Both caused minor to moderate damage, and were rated F1.
2020 European tornado & waterspout outbreak	22–27 September 2020	Denmark, France, Italy, Ukraine, Belgium, Croatia, United Kingdom, Greece, Russia	82	13 injuries	Long lasting large & widespread outbreak. 82 tornado reports reported to ESWD during this outbreak: 3 strongest were F2 rated. A high-end F2/T5 tornado struck Velyka Oleksandrivka in Ukraine, injuring 1 person. More than 300 roofs were damaged, some entirely blown off. Trees saw partial debarking & homes saw loss of walls. An F2 tornado hit Rosignano Marittimo in Italy. Roofs were severely damaged or destroyed. 8 were injured. 1 person was injured by a large F1 tornado that started as a waterspout and hit land in Salerno, Italy. 2 schools were damaged in Albertslund, Denmark, associated with a high-end F1 tornado. Well constructed roofs saw severe roof tile loss, and a roof of a small home was ripped off. Trees with a low height to depth ratio were snapped or lost large branches. All the students were offered crisis assistance/help to combat the traumas that may have occurred. In Le Havre, France, a waterspout hit land and damaged 60 beach huts and some restaurants. A long track F1 tornado caused crop damage along a 28 km long path near Tavriyske in Ukraine. 1 person was injured by an F1 tornado in Greece. An F1 tornado caused severe forest damage near Kotlas in Russia, along a 9.1 km long and 220 meter wide path. In Port-des-Barques, a long track F2 waterspout hit land, caused significant damage to roofs, injuring 2 people. Across its 28.5 km long and 150 meter wide path, vehicles were moved or overturned, including a caravan. Trees were uprooted or snapped, some broken in half. Roofs were damaged, some badly damaged. Another F0 tornado touched down in Marennes, causing crop damage & damaging roofs.: FU / F0 / F1 / F2 / F3 / F4 / F5; 60 / 7 / 12 / 3 / 0 / 0 / 0
2020 Athens tornado	15 October 2020	North Athens, Greece	1	3 injuries	A dangerous F2 tornado touched down in the neighbourhood of Neo Irakleio, north of Athens, on the night of 15 October 2020, injuring three people plus one dog and causing serious damage. This tornado has been considered very dangerous because no one could see it in total darkness. Only a few cameras recorded the tornado that struck Neo Irakleio. Witnesses said there was a second tornado that night.
2021 Varhaňovce tornado	22 April 2021	Varhaňovce, Slovakia	1	0	The occurrence of a tornado was also confirmed by the Slovak Hydrometeorological Institute (SHMÚ).
2021 Rewa tornado	25 April 2021	Rewa, Pomeranian Voivodeship	1	0	A waterspout touched down in the Bay of Puck near Rewa, between Gdynia and Puck.
2021 Tereszpol-Zygmunty tornado	2 May 2021	Tereszpol-Zygmunty, Lublin Voivodeship	1	0	An F2 tornado damaged several roofs. Winds also damaged several buildings in the village of Wólka Wieprzycka in Zamość County.
2021 Orosháza tornado	17 May 2021	Orosháza, Békés County, Hungary	1	0	Several roofs were damaged and several trees were knocked down.
2021 Eger tornado	20 May 2021	Eger, Heves County, Hungary	1	0	Several roofs were damaged.
2021 Northern Zealand tornadoes	21 May 2021	North Zealand	2	0	2 tornadoes confirmed across Northern Zealand in Denmark. An F0 struck Ølstykke (Ølstykke-Stenløse), damaging a conservatory and tossing a trampoline onto a garage roof. Another F0 tornado appeared near Frederikssund.: FU / F0 / F1 / F2 / F3 / F4 / F5; 0 / 2 / 0 / 0 / 0 / 0 / 0
2021 France – Belgium tornado outbreak	19–20 June 2021	Belgium, France, Germany, Moldova	13	17 injuries	An outbreak extending from 19 June to 20 June hit Europe. A long tracking cyclic supercell produced multiple tornadoes in France. The outbreak started off in France, with a tornado that may have been of F1 – F2 intensity in Saint-Nicolas-de-Bourgueil. Here the roof of a church was ripped off. About 3 hours later, a tornado was reported near Neuvy-en-Beauce. The same supercell then produced an F0 tornado near Étampes, observed by storm spotters. A storm spotter also reported a tornado near La Ferté-Gaucher. Reims was hit by an F1 tornado that damaged a forest and more than 40 homes in the suburbs. In Belgium, multiple tornadoes were confirmed. A high-end F2 tornado damaged several roofs in Beauraing. Around 90 houses were damaged, of which 10 were declared uninhabitable. A sports hall collapsed. Roofs were ripped off of homes. A church lost a large portion of its roof. 17 people sustained minor injuries while on a terrace that collapsed. The tornado traveled 26 kilometers and was up to 500 meters wide. A tornado of F1 or F2 intensity struck Olne. The roof of a school was ripped off and other buildings were damaged. Another tornado of F2 intensity (T4) was reported near Bras. An F2 tornado damaged homes in Laloux. A church was unroofed. In Sorinne-la-Longue, an F1 tornado traveled 3 kilometers, destroying farm crops. The day after, a high-end F1 tornado severely damaged roofs and cars in Sundern, Germany. An F1 tornado was confirmed in Chetrosu, Moldova, causing damage to roofs. Another tornado was reported in France.: FU / F0 / F1 / F2 / F3 / F4 / F5; 3 / 1 / 6 / 3 / 0 / 0 / 0
2021 South Moravia tornado	24 June 2021	Czech Republic, Germany, France, Poland, Russia	8	6 fatalities, 301+ injuries	Rare multiple-vortex IF4 tornado tore through several villages in the South Moravian region of the Czech Republic. The village of Hrušky was hit hard, with half of the village leveled to the ground. In Hodonín, the tornado severely damaged a zoo and a retirement home. In nearby Bohemia, the town of Stebno was hit by what was thought to be an F1 tornado, but was later confirmed to be a downburst, and in Poland, an F2 caused damage in Koniuszowa, injuring 1. Another F1 touched down in Boronów and a third touched down in Wrzelów. Other tornadoes were recorded in France and Germany, but caused no damage. A tornadic waterspout was also confirmed over Lake Peipus in Russia, causing no damage.: FU / F0 / F1 / F2 / F3 / F4 / F5; 3 / 0 / 3 / 1 / 0 / 1 / 0
2021 United Kingdom tornado outbreak	25 June 2021	United Kingdom, Germany	3	0	Multiple tornadoes reported across Europe. 1 strong F1 tornado struck Barking in the United Kingdom, damaging buildings, uprooting trees, and downing brick walls. Another was reported near Opperhausen, Germany. Another tornado touched down near the German town of Kaspeltshub.: FU / F0 / F1 / F2 / F3 / F4 / F5; 2 / 0 / 1 / 0 / 0 / 0 / 0
2021 Bernistap tornado	27 June 2021	Belgium/Luxembourg	1	unknown	F3 tornado observed near the Belgium-Luxembourg border. Homes severely damaged & cows were killed.
2021 Germany tornado outbreak	29 June 2021	Germany	2	0	In Mecklenburg-Vorpommern, an F1 touched down in Schmachthagen, causing tree damage. This was a narrow tornado at 10 meters, but it traveled 3.3 km. In Brandenburg, another F1 tornado touched down in Wensickendorf, downing trees and damaging buildings. In a forest, trees were also downed and twisted; one tree landed on a car. The tornado also hit an animal sanctuary, causing minor to moderate damage.: FU / F0 / F1 / F2 / F3 / F4 / F5; 0 / 0 / 2 / 0 / 0 / 0 / 0
2021 Odder Kommune tornadoes	2 July 2021	Odder Kommune, Køge Kommune	2	0	2 tornadoes confirmed across Denmark. 1 touched down near Odder and another near Bjæverskov. In addition, the storms caused flooding.: FU / F0 / F1 / F2 / F3 / F4 / F5; 0 / 2 / 0 / 0 / 0 / 0 / 0
2021 Baltic Sea waterspout outbreak	19–20 July 2021	Baltic Sea	25	0	Large waterspout outbreak across the Baltic Sea in a span of 2 days, producing 25 known reports. ESWD mentions that 1 waterspout appeared outside Alytus in Lithuania, 1 outside Klaipėda in Lithuania, while outside Jastarnia, Władysławowo and Chałupy in Poland, 6 waterspouts were photographed and filmed. Just outside Jantar, 2 waterspouts were photographed. North of Lubiatowo, another waterspout was reported, and 2 others outside Białogóra and Łeba. Two waterspouts were also reported outside Norrtälje in Sweden. One was also reported in Russia. On the 20th, a storm spotter reported a waterspout outside Unieście in Poland. 5 waterspouts were reported in Estonia, and 2 were reported in Germany. A brief landspout was also reported near Żory in Poland. In addition, large hailstones of 10 cm were reported in Serbia.: FU / F0 / F1 / F2 / F3 / F4 / F5; 25 / 0 / 0 / 0 / 0 / 0 / 0
August 2021 Eastern Europe tornado outbreak	2 August 2021	Croatia, Estonia, Latvia, Lithuania, Poland, Russia, Belarus, France, Sweden	29	4 fatalities, 15 injuries	On 2 August, a significant tornado outbreak affected large portions of Europe, but mainly Eastern Europe. Ten tornadoes occurred in Tver Oblast, Russia, the most significant of which was an F3 that caused major damage in Andreapol, killing three people and injuring 10 others. Sixty-five homes were damaged or destroyed in town, structural debris was scattered throughout residential areas, large trees were snapped and denuded, power lines were downed, and vehicles were damaged. Outside of Andreapol, a wide path of trees was flattened as the tornado moved through remote forested areas. An F2 struck the small village of Rogozha, damaging homes and outbuildings, killing one person, and injuring four others. A small and poorly anchored building was pushed off of its foundation and destroyed, and countless large trees were snapped in and around the village as well. Two additional F2s occurred in very remote areas near the towns of Zabor'ye and Glazuny as well, and cut paths of significant tree damage through areas of dense forest. A tornado also impacted the village of Kartun', causing F1 tree and roof damage. The five other tornadoes that occurred in Tver Oblast were also rated F1, and downed numerous trees and tree limbs near the small villages of Kononovo, Zaplav'ye, Krasukha, Zarech'ye, and Zabor'ye. Five additional F1s also caused tree damage in unpopulated areas of Pskov Oblast. In Belarus, a high-end F1 inflicted considerable roof damage to homes and apartment buildings in Rasony, where one person was injured by a falling tree. Four other F1s also downed numerous trees in more rural areas of Belarus that afternoon, including one that was caught on video near Strubki. Additional tornado reports were reported in other parts of Europe. Six waterspouts occurred in the Baltic Sea as well, within Sweden, Latvia, Lithuania, Estonia and Poland, as well as in the Mediterranean Sea & the English Channel, within Croatia & France.: FU / F0 / F1 / F2 / F3 / F4 / F5; 9 / 0 / 16 / 3 / 1 / 0 / 0
2021 Slovakia-Poland tornado outbreak	5 August 2021	Slovakia, Poland, Italy	6	0	In Poland, an F0 – F1 tornado caused damage in Rzeszów. Some debris lifted by the tornado (probably large tree branches) was filmed. At least two trees were downed on a bicycle path; other downed trees in this area were spotted. Another F1 tornado was reported near Józefów. At least several roofs were damaged, with one roof completely torn off. Downed trees were also reported. Another tornado was reported near Ujazd Dolny. An F2 also damaged several homes, uprooting a couple of trees near Petkovce in Slovakia. Some homes had their roof torn off. In Italy, two twin waterspouts hit land.: FU / F0 / F1 / F2 / F3 / F4 / F5; 3 / 1 / 1 / 1 / 0 / 0 / 0
2021 Northern Europe tornado outbreak	15–16 August 2021	Denmark, Germany, Russia, Spain	9	0	An outbreak struck across Europe, with Northern Europe being hit the hardest. The outbreak began with a waterspout that hit Gelendzhik, Russia. No damage is known. About 25 minutes later, an F1 tornadic waterspout hit the port area of Oliva, Spain, flipping boats and overturning a 75 kg catamaran. A line of supercells then developed over Germany, producing a large tornadic waterspout outside Maasholm, near the Danish/German sea border. A second waterspout also developed near Laboe. About 20 minutes later, at 22:09 CEST, a tornado remained over open fields north of Maribo, Denmark. At around 23:35 CEST, a high-end F1/T3 tornado struck Neble and Lendemarke. Trees were uprooted or snapped, 3 buildings, including an outbuilding, lost their roof, walls were damaged and heavy objects were thrown. The tornado travelled 3 km with a max width up to 150 meters. The day after, an F0 tornado hit near Næsby. In Germany, an F1 tornado started as a waterspout and moved ashore, destroying decks and damaging trees. The same supercell then produced a high-end F2 tornado that hit Berumerfehn. Homes saw roof loss or severe damage, and a camper was overturned. Trees were severely damaged or partly debranched with debris wrapped around. More than 50 homes were damaged, and more than 100 trees were damaged.: FU / F0 / F1 / F2 / F3 / F4 / F5; 4 / 1 / 3 / 1 / 0 / 0 / 0
2021 Ivano-Frankivsk tornado	24 August 2021	Ukraine	1	0	On 24 August 2021, a brief weak tornado occurred in Ivano-Frankivsk, Ukraine. It lasted about 5 minutes, caused no damage, and was captured on video by a local resident and later submitted to the European Severe Weather Database (ESWD).
2021 Pantelleria tornado	10 September 2021	Italy	5	2 fatalities, 9 injuries	5 tornadoes were reported to ESWD. A high-end F2 tornadic waterspout damaged several roofs, and several trees and cars were knocked down in Pantelleria. Another 3 waterspouts were reported in Italy that day. A tornado was also reported near Leerdam, the Netherlands.: FU / F0 / F1 / F2 / F3 / F4 / F5; 4 / 0 / 0 / 1 / 0 / 0 / 0
2021 northern Italy tornado outbreak	19 September 2021	Italy	11	0	A series of thunderstorms produced several tornadoes in the Lombardia and Emilia Romagna regions of Italy. The tornadoes hit the towns of Roncaro, Marzano, Corte Palasio, Settimo Milanese, Soresina, Pontevico, Carpenedolo and Carpi, causing heavy damage such as collapsed farm buildings, damaged roofs and downed or snapped trees. In addition, three waterspouts were reported outside livorno, and another near Lignano Sabbiadoro.: FU / F0 / F1 / F2 / F3 / F4 / F5; 4 / 1 / 2 / 4 / 0 / 0 / 0
2021 Po Delta tornadoes	6 October 2021	Italy	24	0	A multicellular storm complex resulted in flooding and 12 tornadoes in areas south and west of Venice. Two of the tornadoes were waterspouts that remained over the water, but the other 10 developed and tracked over land. Only five of them were rated, with one causing F2 damage to buildings in the town of Rosolina. 12 more waterspouts occurred around the Italian coastlines with no additional landfalls.: FU / F0 / F1 / F2 / F3 / F4 / F5; 19 / 1 / 3 / 1 / 0 / 0 / 0
Storm Aurore tornado outbreak	20–21 October 2021	France, Germany, Netherlands, Denmark, United Kingdom	9	11 injuries	Two tornadoes touched down in the Netherlands, one of which were rated F1 and injured 4 people in Barendrecht. Several roofs were damaged, some roof tiles flew through windows. Cars were moved and trees were uprooted, one of which landed on a car. An F0 tornado caused damage in Ferring, UK. Large branches were broken off trees and fences were blown over. 1 F1/T2 tornado was reported in the town of Kiel, Germany. Roofs were damaged & a trampoline were carried 100 meters, and 7 people were injured. another tornado was reported in Elten. An F1 tornado north of Ornebjerg in Denmark overturned a caravan & damaged trees. 2 tornadoes reported in France, one of which had no rating but may be in the F0 – F1 range, trees uprooted. A waterspout was also reported in Turkey: FU / F0 / F1 / F2 / F3 / F4 / F5; 4 / 2 / 3 / 0 / 0 / 0 / 0
2021 Sicily tornado outbreak	16–18 November 2021	Italy	18	1 fatality, 2 injuries	Starting on 16 November an outbreak of tornadoes and waterspouts affected Sicily. On the 16th eight tornadoes hit the island causing F0 and F1 damage to trees, farms and port buildings with only two causing no known damage. After dawn on the 17th two strong tornadoes hit Comiso and eastern Modica. Both were rated F2, with the Modica tornado more towards the higher end of the F2 level. In Comiso multiple industrial buildings were severely damaged while in Modica one person was killed and a couple was injured; the Modica tornado bent a steel power truss and severely damaged several stone farm buildings and homes. On the 18th a last, unrated tornado occurred near Caltabellotta. 6 more waterspouts occurred and remained over the sea, along with a seventh one in Sardinia.: FU / F0 / F1 / F2 / F3 / F4 / F5; 10 / 4 / 2 / 2 / 0 / 0 / 0
2022 Ballyduff tornado	7 January 2022	Ballyduff, Ireland	2	0	A high-end F0 tornado hit Ballyduff. Roof tiles were ripped off and a car was damaged by debris. A waterspout was also reported in the UK.: FU / F0 / F1 / F2 / F3 / F4 / F5; 1 / 1 / 0 / 0 / 0 / 0 / 0
2022 Croatia tornado outbreak	7 February 2022	Benkovac, Mravince	3	0	An F1 tornado struck Benkovac, causing damage to 36 homes. Cars were damaged by flying debris. A caravan was destroyed & blown over a distance of 100 meters. ESWD mentions that another brief F0 tornado was observed near Mravince, causing minor damage, while a waterspout was reported in Italy.: FU / F0 / F1 / F2 / F3 / F4 / F5; 1 / 1 / 1 / 0 / 0 / 0 / 0
Storm Dudley tornado outbreak	17 February 2022	Germany, Poland, Italy	20	2 fatalities, 5 injuries	A rainband with embedded thunderstorms associated with Storm Dudley went through central Europe during night time, producing widespread severe wind damage & at least 20 tornadoes in Germany and Poland, with 1 tornado produced by a different weather system in Italy. The first tornado of the day hit the village of Casekow in eastern Germany. Strong damage was done to a big farm building and a small forest area. Some residential buildings were also hit. An F1 tornado caused moderate damage in Skwierzyna. Multiple roofs were damaged, including a roof of an outhouse that was ripped off. Trees were downed & debris was impaled into a concrete building. Further into Poland, buildings got heavily by several F2 tornadoes. Near Sucharzewo, an F2 tornado caused significant damage. A farm saw roof damage, while a cowshed with bulls inside was destroyed, killing a bull. A forest was severely damaged with uprooted, snapped or twisted trees. Buildings in Sucharzewo saw extensive roof damage, some entirely destroyed. In Sośnica near Dobrzyca several well-built residential buildings were significantly damaged, resulting in a high-end F2 rating. In Kraków, a brief tornado toppled a construction crane, killing the operator and another construction worker. At least 5 were injured during the outbreak.: FU / F0 / F1 / F2 / F3 / F4 / F5; 4 / 0 / 4 / 12 / 0 / 0 / 0
2022 Çandır, Serik Tornado	2 March 2022	Çandır	1	0	The ESWD mentions a F1 Tornado reported in Çandır, Turkey.
2022 Italy tornado outbreak	1–3 April 2022	Italy, Croatia	6	0	Outbreak of waterspouts and tornadoes hit parts of Italy and Croatia.
2022 Ceuta waterspout	5 April 2022	Ceuta, Spain	1	0	A waterspout was spotted off the coast of Ceuta, Spain.
2022 Pennal tornado	6 April 2022	Gwynedd, Wales	1	0	A tornado was confirmed in the town of Pennal, Wales, at least 93 mph winds were recorded, and over £100,000 damage was caused by the tornado. The tornado lifted lambs and ewes into the air, killing an ewe.
2022 Kandel tornado	26 April 2022	Kandel, Germany	1	1 injury	According to the ESWD, a tornado hit Kandel in Germany. Resulting in a power outage in parts of the town. The tornado received an F0 rating.
2022 May western Russia tornadoes	11–12 May 2022	Russia, Ukraine	4	0	On 11 May, a waterspout was confirmed off the coast of Novomikhaylovsky, Russia. Next day, a QLCS tornado was seen in Fatezh. A high-end F1 tornado in Luzhitsy damaged roofs, outbuildings and downed trees. A tornado was also reported in Martussivka, Ukraine.: FU / F0 / F1 / F2 / F3 / F4 / F5; 3 / 0 / 1 / 0 / 0 / 0 / 0
2022 landspout and tornado outbreak	16–17 May 2022	Russia, United Kingdom, Germany, Czech Republic	7	0	Widespread landspouts and tornadoes struck the continent. On 16 May, two landspouts were observed in Kemerovo Oblast, Russia and a tornado was observed near Dallowgill in the UK. A weak F0 tornado damaged several roofs and uprooted a tree in Bekovo, Russia. On 17 May, another landspout was observed near Staryy Tokmak, Russia. A brief tornado was reported near Borna in Germany and brief multiple-vortex tornado near Borek in Czech Republic.: FU / F0 / F1 / F2 / F3 / F4 / F5; 5 / 2 / 0 / 0 / 0 / 0 / 0
2022 Germany tornado outbreak	20 May 2022	Germany, Netherlands, Russia	10+	46+ injured	In the Netherlands, an F1 tornado struck Beek, damaging roofs. Some roofs were severely damaged. In Germany, one cyclic supercell produced at least 5 tornadoes. A large wedge tornado tracking 13.4 km struck Lippstadt, leaving severe damage to roofs and trees. The second damaging tornado struck Paderborn, Germany, injuring 38 people, 13 of which are in serious conditions. Considerable damage occurred with this tornado along its 23.5 km long path. Both the Lippstadt and the Paderborn Tornado received a rating of high-end F2. The third tornado from this storm struck Lütmarsen, receiving an F1 rating as it uprooted dozens of trees and damaged roofs. Then, another F2 tornado that tracked for 11.2 km and mowed down a wide swath of forest, as well as causing severe roof damage, struck Merxhausen. The last confirmed tornado from this storm was a brief F1 that struck Langelsheim, causing slight roof damage. A different storm produced a short-lived F1 tornado which struck Herford, causing roof damage. Another partly rain-wrapped F1 tornado was observed near Hillscheid, causing damage to roofs and forests. The last tornado in Germany of the day was another F1 that struck Abtsgmünd, damaging roofs and cars as well as a forest. In Russia, a brief F0 tornado caused roof damage in Ilovlya: FU / F0 / F1 / F2 / F3 / F4 / F5; 0 / 1 / 6 / 3 / 0 / 0 / 0
June 2022 widespread tornado outbreak	1 June 2022	Turkey, Germany, Denmark, Poland, Netherlands	7+	0	A waterspout struck Hoorn in the Netherlands, 15 minutes later, a large funnel cloud in Dziećmarów, Poland was reported to have contact with the ground. A long stretching funnel cloud was observed an hour later in Tåstrup, Denmark. Several more tornadoes and waterspouts struck Germany and Denmark including a tornado in Glauburg. And finally at 15:03, a F0 tornado damage greenhouses and farms in İmişehir, Turkey.
20 June tornado outbreak	20 June 2022	Germany, Denmark, Russia	8	0	A tornado and waterspout outbreak affected north Europe. A waterspout was observed near Dyngby in Denmark, followed by nn F0 tornado that remained over open fields near Randlev. A large F1 tornado was observed near Borodinsk near Orenburg, Russia. Seven houses were damaged, with some roofs partially or entirely blown off. Additionally a house sustained minor roof damage with a corner of its exterior walls blown in. Trees were also uprooted and fences were downed.: FU / F0 / F1 / F2 / F3 / F4 / F5; 6 / 1 / 1 / 0 / 0 / 0 / 0
2022 Zierikzee tornado	27 June 2022	Zierikzee, Netherlands	1	1 fatality, 7 injured	A tornadic waterspout came ashore and caused damage to Zierikzee, including a roof being blown off. Several other roofs were damaged. The gable of a house collapsed. A woman was killed after she was hit by a roof tile, 7 people sustained injuries.
2022 Baltic Sea tornado & waterspout outbreak sequence	4–19 July 2022	Sweden, Finland, Estonia, Latvia, Lithuania, Poland, Russia	42	0	Outbreak from the ESWD, at least 20 waterspouts in Estonia, including a strong F1 wedge tornado in Paali.
July 2022 Italy tornado outbreak	26–30 July 2022	Italy	7	1 injury	At least 7 tornadoes and waterspouts spotted across all of Italy. On 26 July, 3 tornadoes one in Liguria, one in Lombardia, and one in Friuli-Venezia Giulia that injured a woman. From the 28 – 30 4 more tornadoes occurred across Italy.
2022 British Isles tornadoes	6 September 2022	Scotland and England	3	None	On the morning of 5 September, TORRO issued a rare tornado watch for portions of Ireland and the United Kingdom. On 6 September, at least two tornadoes touched down across the United Kingdom and one tornado touched down in Ireland. An F1/T3 tornado between Yaverland and Bembridge blew off the roof of an outbuilding, causing high-F1 to low F2 level damage. This tornado was filmed and viewed by numerous people, but the European Severe Storms Laboratory (ESSL) noted this event may have been two tornadoes. An unrated tornado was observed at Bonnyrigg, just outside Edinburgh. An F1 tornado wa also seen at Killag, Ireland, causing damage to a roof and a chimney. Large tree branches were broken, Trees uprooted or snapped, and outbuildings sustained structural damage.: FU / F0 / F1 / F2 / F3 / F4 / F5; 1 / 0 / 2 / 0 / 0 / 0 / 0
2022 September Outbreak	15–17 September 2022	Italy, Germany, Czech Republic, Denmark, and Sweden	19	None	At about 7:55am local time, a waterspout was reported in Kullavik, Sweden. Later that day, an F0 tornado was observed picking up debris near Zlínský kraj in the Czech Republic. On 16 September, 4 waterspouts were seen at the same time off the coast of Illes Balears in Spain. Then, on the 17th 12 tornadoes and waterpouts occurred acros Europe, in Fano, Italy, a F0 overturned tractors and trailers. Later, at least three tornadoes simultaneously occurred over the baltic sea off the coast of Seeheilbad Graal-Müritz. 5 more tornadoes occurred in Italy including an F1 in Totora. Three more tornadoes then occurred in Denmark.: FU / F0 / F1 / F2 / F3 / F4 / F5; 14 / 4 / 1 / 0 / 0 / 0 / 0
2022 Russia–Ukraine tornado outbreak	18–19 September 2022	Russia, Ukraine	7	3 fatalities, 8 injuries	From 18 to 19 September, 4 tornadoes impacted Russia and 3 tornadoes impacted Ukraine. The first tornado was a waterspout that was observed at about 07:30 local time in Donskoye, Kaliningrad. Then, at 13:30 local time, an F3 tornado struck Buryn, Ukraine, One person died when a wall fell on him. At least 8 other people were injured and hospitalized. About 20 residential buildings were left without a roof, several had destroyed walls. About 10,000 customers were left without electricity. At least upper F2 damage category was assigned based on structural damage (destroyed roofs, partly collapsed walls visible on aerial footage), the rating was updated to F3 based on the attached photos of destroyed brick residential building. Less than 15 minutes later, 2 more tornadoes impacted Ukraine, one in Zinovo (rated F2), and one in Shurovo (F1). In Zinovo, Power transmission were damaged, roofs were destroyed, some walls partly collapsed, large tree branches broke, and trees were uprooted or snapped. In Ol'govka, Russia an F1 tornado struck the town, causing damage to roofs, chimneys, cars and windows. Another F2 tornado also struck L'gov, many houses had their roofs ripped off, insulation layers were damaged, cars were damaged, and windows were smashed. A tornado then passed through Volokno microdistrict of Kursk. The tornado tore off a roof in the Volokno district, killing an 18-year-old student of Automotive Technical College. Another victim was found under a downed tree near the Automotive Technical College on Yunosti street. The next day, an F2 tornado damaged a forest near Svocha, in Russia.: FU / F0 / F1 / F2 / F3 / F4 / F5; 1 / 0 / 3 / 2 / 1 / 0 / 0
October 2022 Northern and the Baltic Sea derecho	18 October 2022	Norway	2	None	During a rare October Derecho, two tornadoes were reported. The first of two tornadoes started as a waterspout which then made landfall and struck Sandve, Norway, causing damage to a commercial building and the complete destruction of a barn along a 0.7 kilometer long path. The European Severe Storms Laboratory rated this tornado F1 on the Fujita scale. The second tornado struck Brevikstranda, Norway, causing damage to several structures and numerous trees. The European Severe Storms Laboratory rated this tornado an F1 on the Fujita scale and rated some tree damage as IF1 on the International Fujita scale.: IFU / IF0 / IF0.5 / IF1 / IF1.5 / IF2 / IF2.5 / IF3 / IF4 / IF5; 0 / 0 / 0 / 2 / 2 / 0 / 0 / 0 / 0 / 0
October 2022 European tornado outbreak	23 October 2022	France, UK, Belgium	11+	1 injury	As severe thunderstorms and supercells moved across Northern France and Southern England, at least 11 tornadoes were produced. Two tornadoes struck Hampshire in the UK, whilst nine hit Northern France. One near New Milton damaged roofs, and one in Hensting came close to Marwell Zoo, damaging the zoo's car park causing moderate damage in the area surrounding. Both tornadoes were rated F1. Two unrated tornadoes struck Beuzeville and Arleux, whilst four F1 tornadoes struck Ferrières-en-Bray, Gaudechart, Beaudéduit and Warlaing. Two F2 tornadoes struck Songeons and Belleuse. The one which hit Songeons injured a 9-year–old girl. The main supercell produced a very long-tracked tornado, hitting numerous towns and only barely missing the city of Amiens. According to Keraunos, the track is 206 km long, making it the longest confirmed tornado path in Europe. The worst damage from this event was rated EF3 as it struck Bihucourt, where it destroyed many homes. The tornado crossed the border into southern Belgium where it dissipated shortly after.: FU / F0 / F1 / F2 / F3 / F4 / F5; 2 / 0 / 6 / 2 / 1 / 0 / 0; Injuries: 1
November 2022 European tornado outbreak	17 November 2022	France, Germany	3	None	Severe thunderstorms and supercells moved across parts of France and Germany, with two of them becoming tornadic. First tornado touched down near Vœuil-et-Giget, France. Minor damage was observed. A short-lived F1 tornado touched down in the community of Suippes in France and damaged dozens of roofs and trees. The third tornado of the day was unusually strong for this time of the year, and struck multiple towns and villages, including Urexweiler, along its 10.9 km long track through the northern Saarland in Germany. Houses and cars were damaged, and severe vegetation damage was also noted in forested areas. It received an F2 rating. Path length and intensity data for the third tornado are still preliminary according to the ESSL.: FU / F0 / F1 / F2 / F3 / F4 / F5; 0 / 1 / 1 / 1 / 0 / 0 / 0
1 February 2023 Tornado outbreak	1 February 2023	Germany	2	0	A brief F1 tornado tracked 0.2 kilometers, reaching 30 meters wide in Hinte, Germany. Roof tiles were ripped off homes. An F2 Tornado hit Lashorst in Germany, along a 5.3 Kilometers & 300 meter long path. Some roofs were damaged & considerable tree damage in a forest was observed: FU / F0 / F1 / F2 / F3 / F4 / F5; 0 / 0 / 1 / 1 / 0 / 0 / 0
2023 Voltana-Alfonsine-Savarna tornado	23 July 2023	Ravenna province, Italy	at least 1	14 injuries	A strong, rain wrapped, IF3 tornado, with wind peaks over 300 km/h, formed from a supercell over the Ravenna province, Emilia Romagna, Italy. The tornado reached a maximum width of 1,3 km and travelled 17 km striking the villages of Voltana and Savarna and the town of Alfonsine. The tornado damaged severely various houses, some were nearly destroyed, destroyed greenhouses and a church, knocked down power lines and damaged crops. The tornado is the strongest recorded one in Emilia Romagna.
La Chaux-de-Fonds tornado & tempest	24 July 2023	(France), Switzerland	at least 1	1 fatality, at least 45 injured	This morning a wide squall line with an echo bow structure is going through east-centre France with a direction from west to east. In the south of this storm, in Bourgogne-Franche-Comté, département of Doubs develops a supercell. About 11:00 AM, tempest with this supercell cross Valley of Morteau and causes important dommages in the forest and on buildings in Montlebon (more than 90 houses with damages) but without injured person. After passing by Valley of Morteau tempest lost energy and crossed Swiss border few after and rest of the supercell go over the town of Le Locle. There this supercell suddenly strengthened up and caused significant and wide damages in the end of Le Locle at the time of 11:20 AM and after in Le Crêt du Locle & then in La Chaux-de-Fonds. In this area storm produced in 5 minutes tremendous downbursts (microbursts) and a strong tornado. Storm appearance was a big fast-moving fog from cloud (supercell) to floor and it was not possible to distinguish any tornado within. A gust of wind was recorded at the speed of 217 km/h in La Chaux-de-Fonds in the Eplatures Airport (probably a microburst gust). The tempest is rated between F2-F3 in the tornado scale and microbursts seemed as strong as tornado gusts. Downbursts crossed centre and south of La Chaux-de-Fonds and tornado mainly north of this town except at the beginning in the neighbourhood of Le Crêt-du-Locle possibly also in the centre. This storm left behind especially in La Chaux-de-Fonds incredible and wide building and tree damages, at leat 45 injured and one fatality due to a cranefall. As a matter of fact about 60% of buildings in this 36000-37000 inhabitants town and 16 km2 forest were damaged. Buildings damages reached 117 millions Swiss francs (similar value in Euros).
Tornado Ilirska Bistrica 2023	1 August 2023	Slovenia	1	0	a Significant tornado developed over Ilirska Bistrica along a 2 km long & 50 meter wide path. The ESSL Rated it IF2, partially deroofing a home. Other damage occurred
Storm Ciarán tornado outbreak sequence	1–4 November 2023	United Kingdom, Bulgaria, Belgium, Italy, France, Croatia, Serbia, Germany, Turkey, Greece, Spain,	32	0 fatalities, 1 injured	A long lasting tornado outbreak associated with European windstorm Ciarán. By midnight to 2 November, a significant IF3/T6 tornado struck Jersey island, UK, along an 8 kilometer-long & a 550 meter wide path. Roofs were torn off, with some homes having their exterior walls partially collapsed. Trees sustained heavy damage, including heavy debranching. Vehicles were damaged and street signs were downed. This was followed by another tornado during the morning in Sompting, UK. A waterspout was observed near Boğazkent, Turkey, and another IF1 tornado hit Castel Focognano, Italy, damaging roofs and causing heavy tree damage, with some trees debranched. On 3 November, two waterspouts were observed in Serbia and Turkey. On 4 November, three waterspouts were observed in Croatia. Two tornadoes hit Bulgaria, with one rated IF3 that caused heavy damage and one injury in the Bulgarian town of Lavino, along a 15 kilometer-long & 250 meter wide path. A second tornado remained over an open field at the Romanian/Bulgarian border near Sratsimir. An IF1.5 tornado hit Dereköy, Turkey. Powerlines were snapped, a Mosque tower collapsed, and trees were downed.: IFU / IF0 / IF0.5 / IF1 / IF1.5 / IF2 / IF2.5 / IF3 / IF4 / IF5; 19 / 0 / 2 / 4 / 1 / 1 / 0 / 2 / 0 / 0
2023 Cologne Tornado	21 December 2023	Cologne, Germany	1	0 fatalities (2 injuries)	IF2/T4 tornado confirmed to drop in the Cologne district of Poll on Thursday evening as hurricane/storm "Zoltan" passed over Germany. The tornado tracked for 16.7 km and measured as wide as 370m. It were rated IF2 based on damage assessment, snapping strong powerlines, and deroofing a house. 2 people sustained injuries
Córdoba Tornado	9 March 2024	Córdoba, Spain	1–2	0	An IF1-IF2 tornado reached 220 km/h windspeeds. It inflicted damage in some roofs and trees. Heavy machinery was overturned on Reina Sofía hospital. A 9000 kg tree was completely uprooted. The damage may have been caused by two different vortices.
Alt Empordà Tornado	16 May 2024	Alt Empordà, Catalonia, Spain	1	0	An IF1,5 tornado, that reached windspeeds of 180 km/h, tore off a farm's roof, killing 40 pigs.
Großpetersdorf-Szombathely Tornado	9 June 2024	Burgenland, Austria Vas, Hungary	1	0	Late in the afternoon, a supercell formed along the SE side of the Alps, producing a tornado in the border area of Austria and Hungary. Its first appearance was S of Großpetersdorf around 18:26 LT and is finally dissipated just NW of Szombathely at 19:04 LT, but several touchdowns may have occurred during this period. The tornado moved through the southern part of Narda (Hungary), completely destroying some older barns and causing roof damages to several houses. It also caused various tree damages along its path from Hannersdorf (Austria) to the area of Sé and Szombathely (Hungary). The peak intensity of the vortex was estimated to be IF1-IF2.
Hasmark Strand Tornado	6 July 2024	Fyn, Denmark	2+	0	During a historic severe weather outbreak, where Denmark's largest hail was recorded (10,5 cm), at least 2 tornadoes would develop at around 13:30–13:40 UTC, and would tear through northern parts of Fyn. An IF0 tornado would destroy parts of a field and rip the branches off of some trees, and another would strike Hasmark Strand, a beach town. It started out as a weak IF0 before strengthening to IF1.5 as it tore several large branches off a European Aspen tree, and hurling them some distance (TRW, DoD 6). A very well rooted, softwood tree was uprooted before the tornado shifted north and remained as a waterspout before dying. Additional tornadoes might've formed in Sønderjylland, however surveys are still ongoing.
2024 Northern Lithuania tornado outbreak	13 July 2024	Šiauliai District, Lithuania	3	2 injuries	3 IF2 ranked tornadoes touched down, one of them tore off a residential house roof and destroyed several farm buildings in villages, and others significantly damaged the towns.
2024 Western Denmark Tornadoes	24 August 2024	Midtjylland, Denmark – Sønderjylland, Denmark	2+	0	During the late evening of 24 August to early morning of 25 August, an organized line of severe storms traversed over western Denmark, bringing with it severe winds and 1+ tornado(es). A small, 180 meter wide tornado would develop south-southwest of Klovborg. Initially an IF0-IF0.5, but quickly strengthened as it uprooted large trees and debranched several others. It tore whole roofs off of older homes and farms. It toppled gravestones and ripped some tiles off of a church. One of Denmark's oldest open-gardens was completely destroyed, with greenhouses damaged, large swaths of trees uprooted, snapped, or debranched. The tornado earned a preliminary IF1.5 rating as it traveled over 4 kilometers. 2 Additional tornadoes might've touched down in the area as well. A video from a Facebook group (TV2 Vejret Billeder) shows what might be, either a wedge, or a rainwrapped tornado over Jels, and damage was reported in the town of Jels which is the direction the video was filmed.
2024 Berezino tornado	28 September 2024	Russia	1	1 fatality	An IF3 tornado struck the village of Berezino in the Klinsky District of Moscow Oblast, killing a person and causing extensive damage.: IFU / IF0 / IF0.5 / IF1 / IF1.5 / IF2 / IF2.5 / IF3 / IF4 / IF5; 0 / 0 / 0 / 0 / 0 / 0 / 0 / 1 / 0 / 0
2024 Spain tornado outbreak	29 October 2024	Spain	3	unknown	During the storm that caused the deadly 2024 Spanish floods, three tornadoes touched down in the Valencian Community of Spain. The most severe tornado, an IF2 with windspeeds of ~220 km/h, caused extensive damage in Alginet and Carlet.: IFU / IF0 / IF0.5 / IF1 / IF1.5 / IF2 / IF2.5 / IF3 / IF4 / IF5; 0 / 0 / 0 / 1 / 1 / 1 / 0 / 0 / 0 / 0
2025 Sicily tornado outbreak	17 January 2025	Italy	4	0	Several tornadoes touched down in Sicily, Italy as Storm Gabri passed over the island. Most notably, a long-tracked multiple-vortex tornado which started as a tornadic waterspout, caused major damage along its > 20 km path after making landfall.: IFU / IF0 / IF0.5 / IF1 / IF1.5 / IF2 / IF2.5 / IF3 / IF4 / IF5; 0 / 0 / 1 / 1 / 0 / 2 / 0 / 0 / 0 / 0
2025 Šakiai District Tornado	7 June 2025	Lithuania	1	0	One IF1 tornado with wind speeds of around 120 km/h touched down in the Šakiai District in Lithuania . No injuries or material damage were reported.: IFU / IF0 / IF0.5 / IF1 / IF1.5 / IF2 / IF2.5 / IF3 / IF4 / IF5; 0 / 0 / 0 / 1 / 0 / 0 / 0 / 0 / 0 / 0
2025 Parkano tornado	3 July 2025	Finland	1	0	During Storm Ulla, an IF2 tornado touched down in a forest near Parkano, uprooting approximately 5 acres of trees. No casualties were reported.: IFU / IF0 / IF0.5 / IF1 / IF1.5 / IF2 / IF2.5 / IF3 / IF4 / IF5; 0 / 0 / 0 / 0 / 0 / 1 / 0 / 0 / 0 / 0
July 2025 European tornado outbreak	19 July 2025	United Kingdom, Belarus, Italy, Poland	0	0	Several small tornadoes were reported across Europe. A waterspout was spotted off the coast of Troon, Scotland as well as 5 Tornadic Waterspouts off the coast of Genoa, Italy. Tornadoes were also reported near Strabla, Poland and Mazyr, Belarus. The strongest tornado of the outbreak was an IF0.5 that struck the village of Eldon, County Durham, where it tore the roofs off of garden sheds, ripped up fences and lifted trampolines and paddling pools.: IFU / IF0 / IF0.5 / IF1 / IF1.5 / IF2 / IF2.5 / IF3 / IF4 / IF5; 8 / 0 / 1 / 0 / 0 / 0 / 0 / 0 / 0 / 0
2025 Paris tornado	20 October 2025	Paris, France	1	1 fatalities, 10 injured	An IF2 tornado touched down in the north-east part of Paris, killing 23-year-old construction worker and injuring 10. The tornado caused damage in approximately 10 districts, of which Ermont was hit hardest.: IFU / IF0 / IF0.5 / IF1 / IF1.5 / IF2 / IF2.5 / IF3 / IF4 / IF5; 0 / 0 / 0 / 0 / 0 / 1 / 0 / 0 / 0 / 0
2025 Portugal and Italy tornado outbreak	15 November 2025	Portugal, Italy	7	1 fatalities, 28 injured	Small tornado outbreak across Portugal and Italy. In the late morning, an IF2 tornado struck a camping site near Albufeira, Portugal, killing 1 person and injuring 28.. Another IF2 tornado caused major damage to a forest near Lagoa, Portugal. Five less powerful tornadoes were reported in Italy.: IFU / IF0 / IF0.5 / IF1 / IF1.5 / IF2 / IF2.5 / IF3 / IF4 / IF5; 2 / 0 / 1 / 1 / 1 / 2 / 0 / 0 / 0 / 0
2026 Turkey tornado outbreak	26-27 January 2026	Turkey	9	0 fatalities, 2 injured	Multiple tornadoes touched down in the provinces of Antalya and Mersin in southern Turkey. 2 injuries were reported. An IF1.5 tornado collapsed the tower of a Mosque in Denizyaka.: IFU / IF0 / IF0.5 / IF1 / IF1.5 / IF2 / IF2.5 / IF3 / IF4 / IF5; 0 / 0 / 2 / 5 / 2 / 0 / 0 / 0 / 0 / 0
2026 Turkey tornado outbreak	May 3, 2026	Turkey, Syria, Cyprus	14	0 fatalities, 19 injured	Multiple tornadoes touched down in the provinces of Gaziantep, Şanlıurfa and Diyarbakır in southern Turkey and northern Syria. An IF4 tornado caused major damage to towns in both countries. An IF2.5 tornado caused severe damage to a small village near Viranşehir by the name of Malta. 19 injuries were reported.: IFU / IF0 / IF0.5 / IF1 / IF1.5 / IF2 / IF2.5 / IF3 / IF4 / IF5; 1 / 0 / 1 / 2 / 1 / 7 / 1 / 0 / 1 / 0
2026 Central Lithuania tornado outbreak	5 June 2026	Lithuania	4	0	At least four tornado were reported in Kaunas County, Panevėžys County and Marijampolė County, causing significant damage to buildings, tearing off roofs, and uprooting trees. No injuries were reported.: IFU / IF0 / IF0.5 / IF1 / IF1.5 / IF2 / IF2.5 / IF3 / IF4 / IF5; 2 / 0 / 0 / 0 / 1 / 1 / 0 / 0 / 0 / 0
2026 Kushva tornadoes	June 22 2026	Russia	1	0 fatalities, 21 injured	An extremely rare tornado outbreak in Sverdlovsk Oblast in Russia occurred with 2 tornadoes occurring. A tornado damaged trees in a forest directly south of Kushva. ESSL rated this tornado an IF1.5. 1h and 40 mins later, an extremely powerful tornado impacted the town of Kushva, Russia, injuring 21 people. 204 houses were damaged with more than 15 destroyed. Fences were destroyed, outbuildings were severely damaged, apartment buildings were severely damaged, and one log house faced IF3 damage. Local surveyors rated this an F4.: IFU / IF0 / IF0.5 / IF1 / IF1.5 / IF2 / IF2.5 / IF3 / IF4 / IF5; 0 / 0 / 0 / 0 / 1 / 0 / 0 / 1 / 0 / 0
2026 Pomas Tornado	August 24 2026	France	1	0 fatalities, 41 injured	A tornado hit Pomas, a village of around 1,000 residents at 17:20 local time, near Carcassonne. This tornado ripped tiles from roofs, destroyed 5/6ths of a house, broke windows, knocked over lorries, damaged a castle partially, and gave the village an electrical outage for a few days. Around 300 buildings were impacted by the tornado, with a lot of people in need of immediate medical attention. This tornado was rated EF3 by KERAUNOS and IF3 by the ESSL.

== See also ==
- Research history of tornadoes
- List of F5 and EF5 tornadoes
  - 1764 Woldegk tornado
  - 1845 Montville tornado
  - 1930 Montello tornado
- List of F4 and EF4 tornadoes
  - List of F4 and EF4 tornadoes (2000–2009)
  - List of F4 and EF4 tornadoes (2020–present)
  - London tornado of 1091
  - 1904 Moscow tornado
  - 1931 Lublin tornado
  - 1968 Black Forest tornado
  - 1984 Soviet Union tornado outbreak
  - August 2008 European tornado outbreak
  - 2021 South Moravia tornado
  - 2026 Turkey tornado outbreak
- List of F3, EF3, and IF3 tornadoes (2020–present)
  - Grand Harbour of Malta tornado
  - 1913 United Kingdom tornado outbreak
  - 1931 Birmingham tornado
  - 2005 Birmingham tornado
  - 2007 Windstorm Kyrill tornado outbreak
  - 2008 Poland tornado outbreak
  - 2009 Krasnozavodsk tornado
  - 2022 Russia–Ukraine tornado outbreak
  - 2022 Windstorm Beatrice tornado outbreak
  - 2023 Windstorm Ciaran tornado outbreak
- List of European tornadoes in 2010
  - List of European tornadoes in 2011
  - List of European tornadoes in 2012
  - List of European tornadoes in 2013
  - List of European tornadoes in 2014
  - List of European tornadoes in 2022
  - List of European tornadoes in 2025
  - List of European tornadoes in 2026
- List of tornadoes striking downtown areas
- List of tornadoes rated on the International Fujita scale
- Tornadoes in Iceland
