= Shurovo =

Shurovo Шурово
- Village
- Location within Vologda Oblast Location within Russia
- Coordinates: 59°18′N 38°08′E
- Country: Russia
- Region: Vologda Oblast
- District: Cherepovetsky District
- Time zone: UTC+3:00

Shurovo (Russian: Шурово) is a rural locality (a village) in Yaganovskoye Rural Settlement, Cherepovetsky District, Vologda Oblast, Russia. The population was 18 as of 2002.

== Geography ==
Shurovo is located 31 km north-west of Cherepovets (the district's administrative centre) by road. Yaganovo is the nearest rural locality.
