= List of European tornadoes in 2022 =

This is a list of all tornadoes that were confirmed throughout Europe by the European Severe Storms Laboratory and local meteorological agencies during 2022. Unlike the United States, the original Fujita Scale and the TORRO scale are used to rank tornadoes across the continent.

== European yearly total ==
There have been 291 confirmed tornadic events reported in Europe in 2022. Countries not listed in this table have no reported tornadoes thus far in 2022.

Tornadoes by country
Country	Total	FU	F0	F1	F2	F3	F4	F5
Austria	1	1	-	-	-	-	-	-
Bulgaria	4	3	1	-	-	-	-	-
Croatia	5	3	1	1	-	-	-	-
Cyprus	2	2	-	-	-	-	-	-
Czech Republic	3	1	1	1	-	-	-	-
Denmark	3	2	1	-	-	-	-	-
Estonia	1	-	1	-	-	-	-	-
France	24	6	10	5	2	1	-	-
Germany	24	8	3	9	4	-	-	-
Greece	44	42	1	1	-	-	-	-
Hungary	2	2	-	-	-	-	-	-
Ireland	3	1	1	1	-	-	-	-
Italy	32	26	3	2	1	-	-	-
Lithuania	3	2	0	1	0	0	0	0
Netherlands	2	1	-	1	-	-	-	-
Norway	3	-	1	2	-	-	-	-
Poland	27	5	2	7	13	-	-	-
Portugal	3	2	1	-	-	-	-	-
Russia	24	13	6	5	-	-	-	-
Spain	6	3	1	2	-	-	-	-
Turkey	24	10	10	4	-	-	-	-
Ukraine	4	1	-	1	1	1	-	-
United Kingdom	2	1	-	1	-	-	-	-
Total	243	134	44	44	21	2	0	0

== January ==
Confirmed tornadoes by Fujita rating
FU	F0	F1	F2	F3	F4	F5	Total
26	5	0	0	0	0	0	31

=== January 7 ===
List of confirmed tornadoes – Friday, January 7, 2022
F#	T#	Location	District/ County	Coord.	Time (UTC)	Path length	Comments/Damage
Ireland
F0	T1	Ballyduff / An Baile Dubh	County Kerry / Contae Chiarraí	52.45°N 9.66°W	09:45 (+/- 5 min.)	Unknown	Cars damaged by flying debris, roofs damaged. Some buildings had windows blown out. Damage has been rated high-end F0 damage.
Jersey / United Kingdom
FU	N/A	Le Hocq	St Clement / Saint Cliément	49.17°N 2.06°E	15:44(+/- 5 min.)	Unknown	No damage reported.
Sources: ESSL Severe Weather Database

=== January 8 ===
List of confirmed tornadoes – Saturday, January 8, 2022
F#	T#	Location	District/ County	Coord.	Time (UTC)	Path length	Comments/Damage
Greece
FU	N/A	Ρόδος (Ródos)	Περιφέρεια Νοτίου Αιγαίου (Periféria Notíou Eyéou)	36.44°N 28.22°E	06:14 (+/- 1 min.)	Unknown	No damage reported.
FU	N/A	Ρόδος (Ródos)	Περιφέρεια Νοτίου Αιγαίου (Periféria Notíou Eyéou)	36.44°N 28.22°E	11:11 (+/- 1 min.)	Unknown	No damage reported.
Turkey
FU	N/A	Fethiye	Muğla ili	36.45°N 28.70°E	11:30 (+/- 30 min.)	Unknown	Part of a waterspout triplet. No damage reported.
FU	N/A	Fethiye	Muğla ili	36.55°N 28.75°E	11:30 (+/- 30 min.)	Unknown	Part of a waterspout triplet. No damage reported.
FU	N/A	Fethiye	Muğla ili	36.59°N 28.76°E	11:30 (+/- 30 min.)	Unknown	Part of a waterspout triplet. No damage reported.
Ireland
FU	N/A	Ballyduff / An Baile Dubh	County Kerry / Contae Chiarraí	52.47°N 9.91°W	16:35 (+/- 15 min.)	Unknown	No damage reported.
Sources: ESSL Severe Weather Database

=== January 9 ===
List of confirmed tornadoes – Sunday, January 9, 2022
F#	T#	Location	District/ County	Coord.	Time (UTC)	Path length	Comments/Damage
Turkey
F0	N/A	Mavikent	Antalya ili	36.30°N 30.33°E	18:20 (+/- 15 min.)	Unknown	Slight damage to greenhouses; roof coverings damaged and torn off in some places.
Sources: ESSL Severe Weather Database

=== January 10 ===
List of confirmed tornadoes – Monday, January 10, 2022
F#	T#	Location	District/ County	Coord.	Time (UTC)	Path length	Comments/Damage
Greece
FU	N/A	Ρόδος (Ródos)	Περιφέρεια Νοτίου Αιγαίου (Periféria Notíou Eyéou)	36.44°N 28.22°E	06:48 (+/- 1 min.)	Unknown	No damage reported.
Sources: ESSL Severe Weather Database

=== January 13 ===
List of confirmed tornadoes – Thursday, January 13, 2022
F#	T#	Location	District/ County	Coord.	Time (UTC)	Path length	Comments/Damage
Cyprus
FU	N/A	Kaplıca / Δαυλός (Davlós)	Mağusa kazası / Επαρχία Αμμοχώστου (Eparchia Ammochostu)	35.46°N 33.89°E	12:45 (+/- 30 min.)	Unknown	No damage reported.
Sources: ESSL Severe Weather Database

=== January 20 ===
List of confirmed tornadoes – Thursday, January 20, 2022
F#	T#	Location	District/ County	Coord.	Time (UTC)	Path length	Comments/Damage
Italy
FU	N/A	Formia	Provincia di Latina	41.25°N 13.61°E	13:00 (+/- 15 min.)	Unknown	No damage reported.
Sources: ESSL Severe Weather Database

=== January 21 ===
List of confirmed tornadoes – Friday, January 21, 2022
F#	T#	Location	District/ County	Coord.	Time (UTC)	Path length	Comments/Damage
Greece
FU	N/A	Ρόδος (Ródos)	Περιφέρεια Νοτίου Αιγαίου (Periféria Notíou Eyéou)	36.43°N 28.19°E	08:57 (+/- 1 min.)	Unknown	Part of a group of 6 simultaneously occurring waterspouts. No damage reported.
FU	N/A	Ρόδος (Ródos)	Περιφέρεια Νοτίου Αιγαίου (Periféria Notíou Eyéou)	36.43°N 28.19°E	08:57 (+/- 1 min.)	Unknown	Part of a group of 6 simultaneously occurring waterspouts. No damage reported.
FU	N/A	Ρόδος (Ródos)	Περιφέρεια Νοτίου Αιγαίου (Periféria Notíou Eyéou)	36.44°N 28.21°E	08:57 (+/- 1 min.)	Unknown	Part of a group of 6 simultaneously occurring waterspouts. No damage reported.
FU	N/A	Ρόδος (Ródos)	Περιφέρεια Νοτίου Αιγαίου (Periféria Notíou Eyéou)	36.44°N 28.20°E	08:57 (+/- 1 min.)	Unknown	Part of a group of 6 simultaneously occurring waterspouts. No damage reported.
FU	N/A	Ρόδος (Ródos)	Περιφέρεια Νοτίου Αιγαίου (Periféria Notíou Eyéou)	36.44°N 28.20°E	08:57 (+/- 1 min.)	Unknown	Part of a group of 6 simultaneously occurring waterspouts. No damage reported.
FU	N/A	Ρόδος (Ródos)	Περιφέρεια Νοτίου Αιγαίου (Periféria Notíou Eyéou)	36.44°N 28.20°E	08:57 (+/- 1 min.)	Unknown	Part of a group of 6 simultaneously occurring waterspouts. No damage reported.
Turkey
F0	N/A	Kızılağaç	Muğla ili	37.03°N 27.50°E	21:00 (+/- 15 min.)	Unknown	Damage to fences and light weight roofs. Tree branches broken.
Sources: ESSL Severe Weather Database

=== January 22 ===
List of confirmed tornadoes – Saturday, January 22, 2022
F#	T#	Location	District/ County	Coord.	Time (UTC)	Path length	Comments/Damage
Turkey
FU	N/A	Konaklı	Antalya ili	36.56°N 31.88°E	12:00 (+/- 15 min.)	Unknown	No damage reported.
Sources: ESSL Severe Weather Database

=== January 24 ===
List of confirmed tornadoes – Monday January 24, 2022
F#	T#	Location	District/ County	Coord.	Time (UTC)	Path length	Comments/Damage
Greece
FU	N/A	Σκύρος (Skýros)	Περιφέρεια Στερεάς Ελλάδας (Periféria Stereás Elládhas)	38.91°N 24.57°E	06:00 (+/- 30 min.)	unknown	Part of a triplet of waterspouts. No damage reported.
FU	N/A	Σκύρος (Skýros)	Περιφέρεια Στερεάς Ελλάδας (Periféria Stereás Elládhas)	38.90°N 24.58°E	06:00 (+/- 30 min.)	unknown	Part of a triplet of waterspouts. No damage reported.
FU	N/A	Σκύρος (Skýros)	Περιφέρεια Στερεάς Ελλάδας (Periféria Stereás Elládhas)	38.90°N 24.56°E	06:00 (+/- 30 min.)	unknown	Part of a triplet of waterspouts. No damage reported.
FU	N/A	Σκόπελος (Skópelos)	Θεσσαλία (Thessalía)	39.12°N 23.73°E	06:45 (+/- 1 min.)	unknown	This waterspout ended up moving onshore, but caused no noticeable damage.
FU	N/A	Κύμη (Kími)	Περιφέρεια Στερεάς Ελλάδας (Periféria Stereás Elládhas)	38.63°N 24.10°E	07:00 (+/- 30 min.)	unknown	No damage reported.
F0	T1	Ξάνεμος (Xánemos)	Θεσσαλία (Thessalía)	39.18°N 23.51°E	08:10 (+/- 1 min.)	unknown	Power transmission and telecommunication infrastructure damage. Roofs damaged. Wind speeds recorded up to 27 m/s (~97 km/h).
FU	N/A	Στενιές (Steniés)	Περιφέρεια Νοτίου Αιγαίου (Periféria Notíou Eyéou)	37.85°N 24.93°E	08:49 (+/- 1 min.)	unknown	This waterspout ended up moving onshore, but caused no noticeable damage.
Italy
FU	N/A	Patti	Sicilia	38.15°N 14.99°E	08:53 (+/- 1 min.)	Unknown	No damage reported.
Sources: ESSL Severe Weather Database

=== January 25 ===
List of confirmed tornadoes –Tuesday, January 25, 2022
F#	T#	Location	District/ County	Coord.	Time (UTC)	Path length	Comments/Damage
Greece
FU	N/A	Σητεία (Siteía)	Κρήτη (Kríti)	35.35°N 26.23°E	06:15 (+/- 1 min.)	Unknown	No damage reported.
FU	N/A	Κόκκινο Χωριό (Kókkino Khorió)	Κρήτη (Kríti)	35.46°N 24.21°E	07:00 (+/- 30 min.)	Unknown	No damage reported.
Sources: ESSL Severe Weather Database

=== January 29 ===
List of confirmed tornadoes – Saturday, January 29, 2022
F#	T#	Location	District/ County	Coord.	Time (UTC)	Path length	Comments/Damage
Russia
F0	N/A	Ана́па (Anápa) / Быгъуркъал (Byghurq’al)	Краснода́рский край (Krasnodárskiy Kray)	44.89°N 37.32°E	12:00 (+/- 1hrs.)	Unknown	A waterspout that came onshore. Roof damage to poorly built structures.
Sources: ESSL Severe Weather Database

== February ==
Confirmed tornadoes by Fujita rating
FU	F0	F1	F2	F3	F4	F5	Total
13	7	10	14	0	0	0	44

=== February 3 ===
List of confirmed tornadoes – Thursday, February 3, 2022
F#	T#	Location	District/ County	Coord.	Time (UTC)	Path length	Comments/Damage
Turkey
F0	N/A	Çakallık	Antalya ili	36.89°N 30.98°E	08:00 (+/- 30 min.)	Unknown	Damage to crops. Greenhouses' roof coverings generally damaged and torn off in some places.
F0	N/A	Güzelbağ	Antalya ili	36.87°N 30.86°E	08:00 (+/- 30 min.)	Unknown	Damage to greenhouses. Roof coverings generally damaged and torn off in a narrow corridor.
Greece
FU	N/A	Ρόδος (Ródos)	Περιφέρεια Νοτίου Αιγαίου (Periféria Notíou Eyéou)	36.45°N 28.21°E	08:00 (+/- 30 min.)	Unknown	No damage reported.
FU	N/A	Μόχλος (Mókhlos)	Κρήτη (Kríti)	35.19°N 25.90°E	09:00 (+/- 30 min.)	Unknown	No damage reported.
Sources: ESSL Severe Weather Database

=== February 6 ===
List of confirmed tornadoes – Sunday, February 6, 2022
F#	T#	Location	District/ County	Coord.	Time (UTC)	Path length	Comments/Damage
Norway
F0	T1	Sandnes	Rogaland County	58.85°N 5.72°E	05:00 (+/- 30 min.)	0.1 km max. width 30m	A brief tornado caused damage in Sandnes. Roof tiles ripped off, wooden fencing downed. An outhouse was picked up by the winds and turned upside down. Trees was uprooted, and small twigs were broken off. The tornado reached 30 meters wide.
Sources: ESSL Severe Weather Database

=== February 7 ===
List of confirmed tornadoes – Monday, February 7, 2022
F#	T#	Location	District/ County	Coord.	Time (UTC)	Path length	Comments/Damage
Croatia
F1	N/A	Miranje	Zadarska	44.00°N 15.58°E	11:15 (+/- 15 min.)	Unknown	36 houses were damaged by this low-end F1 tornado, with mainly roof damage to well built homes. Four cars were damaged due to flying debris.
F0	N/A	Mravince	Splitsko-Dalmatinska	43.53°N 16.51°E	09:00 (+/- 1 hr.)	Unknown	Minor damage reported, however remains unspecified. Debris seen flying in videos.
Italy
FU	N/A	Termoli / Térmëlë	provincia di Campobasso / Pruìnge de Cambuàsce	42.07°N 14.99°E	15:30 (+/- 5 min.)	Unknown	No damage reported.
Sources: ESSL Severe Weather Database

=== February 9 ===
List of confirmed tornadoes – Wednesday, February 9, 2022
F#	T#	Location	District/ County	Coord.	Time (UTC)	Path length	Comments/Damage
Turkey
F0	N/A	Homurlu / Anadolu	Mersin ili	36.85°N 34.77°E	05:15 (+/- 15 min.)	Unknown	Damage to greenhouses. Roof and wall coverings damaged and torn off in some places, frames damaged and partially collapsed.
Sources: ESSL Severe Weather Database

=== February 15 ===
List of confirmed tornadoes – Tuesday, February 15, 2022
F#	T#	Location	District/ County	Coord.	Time (UTC)	Path length	Comments/Damage
Croatia
FU	N/A	Otok Škrda	Zadarska	44.49°N 14.75°E	14:42 (+/- 5 min.)	Unknown	No damage reported
Sources: ESSL Severe Weather Database

=== February 17 (Windstorm Dudley Tornado Outbreak) ===
List of confirmed tornadoes – Thursday, February 17, 2022
F#	T#	Location	District/ County	Coord.	Time (UTC)	Path length	Comments/Damage
Germany
F1	T3	Casekow	Brandenburg	53.21°N 14.20°E	00:46 (+/- 5 min.)	1.1 km, max. width 70m	A high-end F1 tornado damaged multiple points of interest in Casekow. A farm area and farmhouse were badly damaged. Roof and solar panels were lifted and thrown, with parts shred to pieces. Heavy damage was reported in a small, nearby forest, with trees debranched and snapped.
Poland
F1	N/A	Skwierzyna	Lubuskie	52.57°N 15.52°E	02:00 (+/- 5 min.)	Unknown	Roofs destroyed, damage to windows. Large trees debranched. Pieces of wood were thrown up and impaled into a building's insulation layer.
F2	N/A	Izdebno	Wielkopolskie	52.67°N 16.17°E	02:24 (+/- 5 min.)	1.1 km	Significant damage to a local forest was reported, drone photos indicated that the damage was tornadic in nature, as opposed to straight-line winds.
F2	N/A	Sucharzewo	Wielkopolskie	52.15°N 16.83°E	03:03 (+/- 5 min.)	Unknown	Significant tornadic damage reported. Some buildings almost fully destroyed. A brick cowshed collapsed, killing a bull inside. Debarked trees and structural damages indicated strong F2 damage.
F2	T4	Krzykosy, Cząstków	Wielkopolskie	52.25°N 18.83°E	03:11 (+/- 5 min.)	0.8 km max. width 200 m	Tornadic wind damage was spotted in Krzykosy and Cząstków. At least 6 households were damaged in both villages. Power transmission lines destroyed, and damage to roofs or completely destroyed roofs occurred.
F2	N/A	Młodzikowice	Wielkopolskie	52.12°N 17.24°E	03:18 (+/- 5 min.)	0.9 km	An outbuilding and a garage were nearly fully destroyed along with a roof of a cowshed with 50 cows living inside the building. Forests were damaged in a rotating pattern in the immediate area as well.
F2	T4	Grzywna Szlachecka, Kuczwały	Kujawsko-Pomorskie	53.14°N 18.64°E	03:22 (+/- 5 min.)	0.6 km	Buildings were almost fully destroyed, with farmland and insulation layers also damaged. Some walls partly collapsed, and heavy damage to roofs was reported in the area as well.
F2	T4	Nowe Miasto nad Wartą	Wielkopolskie	52.09°N 17.40°E	03:25 (+/- 5 min.)	1.7 km, max. width 240m	Significant wind damage was spotted in a local forest. Large trees were uprooted. No structural damage reported.
F1	T3	Łobzowiec	Wielkopolskie	51.96°N 17.34°E	03:30 (+/- 5 min.)	1.5 km	Damage to multiple residential and outbuildings, especially to roofs, a few of which have been completely destroyed. An agricultural trailer has been partially overturned. A few acacias have been damaged to the north-west of the village and a willow tree has been downed to the east.
F2	N/A	Lgów	Wielkopolskie	52.10°N 17.54°E	03:32 (+/- 5 min.)	Unknown	A lot of damage to structures (damaged or destroyed roofs in particular) occurred with debris scattered around. A local forest was partially destroyed. Cars dented, Car windows broken.
F2	T4	Kosewo	Wielkopolskie	52.40°N 17.95°E	03:34 (+/- 5 min.)	0.1 km max. width 100 m	A very brief tornado ripped trees in a circular pattern. A building sustained broken windows and insulation layer damages.
F2	T5	Dobrzyca, Sośnica	Wielkopolskie	52.40°N 17.95°E	03:42	Unknown	Heavy structural damage, numerous damaged or destroyed roofs, downed trees damaged power lines and cars were reported.
F2	N/A	Stara Ciświca	Wielkopolskie	52.01°N 17.98°E	03:50 (+/- 15 min.)	Unknown	Several buildings were destroyed, others had walls partially collapsed. Some ducks were killed under a heavily damaged foil tunnel. Many trees were uprooted and snapped.
F1	T3	Żurawin	Wielkopolskie	52.08°N 18.18°E	03:55 (+/- 5 min.)	Unknown	A roof of a residential building was partially damaged with wooden beams and metal sheets blown at least 150 metres away from a residential building. A few trees were also damaged.
F2	N/A	Tykadłów, Żelazków, Zborów, Podzborów	Wielkopolskie	51.85°N 18.18°E	04:00 (+/- 5 min.)	Unknown	Roofs were destroyed, alongside windows and insulation layers. Walls collapsed, Car window and windshield broken. Trees were uprooted or snapped.
FU	N/A	Turek	Wielkopolskie	52.01°N 18.53°E	04:08 (+/- 5 min.)	Unknown	Multiple trees have been damaged or snapped around the area of Korytkowska street. Debris, likely from small structures in the area, has been scattered in a path towards the north-east. Numerous damage occurred in the villages of Korytków and Chlebów, which are to the east of the previously mentioned area.
F1	T3	Laski	Wielkopolskie	52.00°N 18.57°E	04:09 (+/- 5 min.)	Unknown	Trucks and trailers were overturned. Roofs nearly entirely torn off from residential buildings. Roofs elements (sheet metal, warming) stuck on the nearby trees.
F1	T3	Łęka	Wielkopolskie	52.13°N 18.64°E	04:10 (+/- 5 min.)	Unknown	Roofs were damaged or destroyed in the village. In one case, a wooden beam was stuck into the elevation of a building. Trees in a nearby forest were destroyed in a converging pattern, indicative of tornadic high-end F1 damage.
F2	N/A	Słomków Kościelny	Wielkopolskie	52.00°N 18.66°E	04:13 (+/- 5 min.)	Unknown	A summer house was completely destroyed and a car nearby was overturned and heavily damaged.
F2	N/A	Wójcice, Smaszków	Łódzkie	51.65°N 18.47°E	04:15 (+/- 5 min.)	Unknown	Two injuries - Numerous houses, outbuildings and trees were damaged. Power transmition and communication lines were destroyed. A 65-year-old woman sustained head injuries by a falling roof truss. Her 16-year-old grandson was injured by broken window glass.
F1	T3	Aleksandria	Łódzkie	51.61°N 18.48°E	04:20 (+/- 5 min.)	Unknown	Several buildings in close proximity to each other were considerably damaged. Trucks and trailers were overturned, and walls were partly collapsed.
F1	N/A	Krośniewice	Łódzkie	52.27°N 19.19°E	04:26 (+/- 5 min.)	Unknown	At least 2 roofs damaged. One of a residential building, ripped apart and scattered for a distance of ~150 metres. The other of a nearby outbuilding, partially torn off.
F2	N/A	Różyce Grochowe, Sulimy, Mrożewice	Łódzkie	51.97°N 19.19°E	04:30 (+/- 5 min.)	3 km	In some parts of the villages roof debris was scattered 400m or more. Buildings were almost fully destroyed, walls collapsed and roofs torn off. A forest was destroyed, with many trees snapped or uprooted.
FU	N/A	Sierosław	Łódzkie	51.50°N 19.62°E	05:05 (+/- 5 min.)	Unknown	Two trucks were overturned on A1 highway near Sierosław. One of the drivers sustained injuries. Almost all buildings in the village sustained damage, roofs destroyed and damage to windows and insulation layers. One person was injured.
FU	N/A	Kraków	Małopolskie	50.02°N 20.05°E	08:05 (+/- 5 min.)	Unknown	2 deaths – A crane was overturned causing two fatalities, construction workers on the ground, and two more people were injured. A roof of a Biedronka supermarket on Półłanki street was heavily damaged. Some cars were damaged by fallen elements of the roof. Two people were injured.
Italy
FU	N/A	Patti	Sicilia	38.16°N 14.96°E	09:00 (+/- 5 min.)	Unknown	No damage reported.
Sources: ESSL Severe Weather Database

=== February 22 ===
List of confirmed tornadoes – Tuesday, February 22, 2022
F#	T#	Location	District/ County	Coord.	Time (UTC)	Path length	Comments/Damage
Turkey
F1	N/A	Yalı	Muğla ili	36.99°N 27.53°E	04:25 (+/- 5 min.)	Unknown	A likely waterspout coming onshore. It snapped a power line and overthrew a container.
Greece
FU	N/A	Κάτω Αχαΐα (Káto Achaḯa)	Περιφέρεια Δυτικής Ελλάδας (Periféria Dhitikís Elládhas)	38.15°N 21.55°E	07:00 (+/- 1 hrs.)	Unknown	No damage reported.
FU	N/A	Ρόδος (Ródos)	Περιφέρεια Νοτίου Αιγαίου (Periféria Notíou Eyéou)	36.47°N 28.22°E	08:21 (+/- 1 min.)	Unknown	No damage reported.
Sources: ESSL Severe Weather Database

=== February 23 ===
List of confirmed tornadoes – Wednesday, February 23, 2022
F#	T#	Location	District/ County	Coord.	Time (UTC)	Path length	Comments/Damage
Turkey
F0	N/A	Altıntaş	Antalya ili	36.90°N 30.82°E	08:15 (+/- 15 min.)	Unknown	Snapped and downed power lines. Crops damaged or destroyed. Greenhouses' roof and wall coverings damaged and torn off (broken in cases of glass coverings). Greenhouses' frames damaged and collapsed, some greenhouses completely destroyed.
Sources: ESSL Severe Weather Database

=== February 26 ===
List of confirmed tornadoes – Saturday, February 26, 2022
F#	T#	Location	District/ County	Coord.	Time (UTC)	Path length	Comments/Damage
Italy
FU	N/A	Roca Vecchia	Puglia	40.29°N 18.42°E	10:10 (+/- 5 min.)	Unknown	No damage reported.
FU	N/A	Napoli / Napule	Campania	40.80°N 14.19°E	11:45 (+/- 15 min.)	Unknown	No damage reported.
Sources: ESSL Severe Weather Database

=== February 27 ===
List of confirmed tornadoes – Sunday, February 27, 2022
F#	T#	Location	District/ County	Coord.	Time (UTC)	Path length	Comments/Damage
Greece
F0	T1	Δήμητρα (Dímitra)	Περιφέρεια Δυτικής Ελλάδας (Periféria Dhitikís Elládhas)	37.87°N 21.20°E	04:00 (+/- 30 min.)	1 km	Damage to trees, (broken branches, some trees entirely downed). Road impassable (100 m). Greenhouses' roof and wall coverings damaged and/or torn off, frames damaged and collapsed, some greenhouses completely destroyed. Crops damaged and/or destroyed.
FU	N/A	Παντοκράτορας (Pantokrátoras)	Ήπειρος (Ípiros)	38.95°N 20.73°E	12:00 (+/- 15 min.)	Unknown	No damage reported.
Sources: ESSL Severe Weather Database; Δήμητρα Βαρθολομιού: Ανεμοστρόβιλος προκάλεσε καταστροφές σε θερμοκήπια - "Κόπηκαν" δέντρα (photos & video)

== March ==
Confirmed tornadoes by Fujita rating
FU	F0	F1	F2	F3	F4	F5	Total
11	3	1	0	0	0	0	14

=== March 1 ===
List of confirmed tornadoes – Tuesday, March 1, 2022
F#	T#	Location	District/ County	Coord.	Time (UTC)	Path length	Comments/Damage
Italy
FU	N/A	Palermo / Palermu	Sicilia	38.21°N 13.28°E	10:46 (+/- 1 min.)	Unknown	No damage Reported.
FU	N/A	Palermo / Palermu	Sicilia	38.22°N 13.32°E	10:53 (+/- 1 min.)	Unknown	No damage Reported.
Sources: ESSL Severe Weather Database

=== March 2 ===
List of confirmed tornadoes – Wednesday, March 2, 2022
F#	T#	Location	District/ County	Coord.	Time (UTC)	Path length	Comments/Damage
Turkey
FU	N/A	Samandağ	Hatay ili	36.08°N 35.94°E	10:00 (+/- 30 min.)	Unknown	No damage reported.
F1	N/A	Çandır	Antalya ili	36.96°N 31.05°E	17:35 (+/- 15 min.)	5 km	Trees damaged or downed. Crops and vegetation damaged and/or destroyed. Damage to power and telecommunication infrastructure. Greenhouses' coverings damaged and torn off, frames damaged and partly collapsed. Houses with damage ranging from some roof tiles blown away to broken windows and partly collapsed walls. Upper structure oh a weak building got ripped off and blown away. A mosques tower has collapsed as well.
Sources: ESSL Severe Weather Database

=== March 3 ===
List of confirmed tornadoes – Thursday, March 3, 2022
F#	T#	Location	District/ County	Coord.	Time (UTC)	Path length	Comments/Damage
Turkey
F0	N/A	Köşkerler	Antalya ili	36.28°N 29.99°E	04:00 (+/- 30 min.)	Unknown	Crops damaged or destroyed. Greenhouses' coverings damaged and torn off in some places, frames damaged, with collapse occurring in one area.
Sources: ESSL Severe Weather Database

=== March 5 ===
List of confirmed tornadoes – Saturday, March 5, 2022
F#	T#	Location	District/ County	Coord.	Time (UTC)	Path length	Comments/Damage
Spain
FU	N/A	Águilas	Región de Murcia	37.35°N 1.53°E	15:25 (+/- 5 min.)	Unknown	Part of a pair of waterspouts. No damage reported.
FU	N/A	Águilas	Región de Murcia	37.36°N 1.51°E	15:25 (+/- 5 min.)	Unknown	Part of a pair of waterspouts. No damage reported.
Sources: ESSL Severe Weather Database

=== March 8 ===
List of confirmed tornadoes – Tuesday, March 8, 2022
F#	T#	Location	District/ County	Coord.	Time (UTC)	Path length	Comments/Damage
Greece
FU	N/A	Κέα (Kéa) / Τζια (Tzia)	Περιφέρεια Νοτίου Αιγαίου (Periféria Notíou Eyéou)	37.63°N 24.40°E	04:50 (+/- 5 min.)	Unknown	No damage reported.
FU	N/A	Μαστιχάρι (Mastichári)	Περιφέρεια Νοτίου Αιγαίου (Periféria Notíou Eyéou)	36.85°N 27.08°E	10:26 (+/- 1 min.)	Unknown	No damage reported.
Sources: ESSL Severe Weather Database

=== March 9 ===
List of confirmed tornadoes – Wednesday, March 9, 2022
F#	T#	Location	District/ County	Coord.	Time (UTC)	Path length	Comments/Damage
Greece
FU	N/A	Ερεικούσσα (Ereikoússa) / Merlera	Περιφέρεια Ιονίων Νήσων (Periféria Ioníon Níson)	39.88°N 19.61°E	06:31 (+/- 1 min.)	Unknown	No damage reported.
Turkey
F0	N/A	Kapısuyu	Hatay ili	36.13°N 35.92°E	16:00 (+/- 15 min.)	Unknown	A waterspout that came onshore. F0 damage reported.
Sources: ESSL Severe Weather Database

=== March 10 ===
List of confirmed tornadoes – Thursday, March 10, 2022
F#	T#	Location	District/ County	Coord.	Time (UTC)	Path length	Comments/Damage
France
F0	N/A	Saint-Germain-du-Puch (Gironde)	Nouvelle-Aquitaine		16:25 (+/- 5 min.)	5.8 km	Some very light damage.
Sources: Keraunos Database
Italy
FU	N/A	Palmi / Parmi	Calabria / Καλαβρία (Kalavrìa) / Kalavrì	38.42°N 15.83°E	15:45 (+/- 5 min.)	Unknown	No damage reported.
FU	N/A	Scilla / U Scigghiu / Σκύλλα (Skýlla)	Calabria / Καλαβρία (Kalavrìa) / Kalavrì	38.25°N 15.71°E	16:30 (+/- 5 min.)	Unknown	No damage reported.
Sources: ESSL Severe Weather Database

=== March 11 ===
List of confirmed tornadoes – Friday, March 11, 2022
F#	T#	Location	District/ County	Coord.	Time (UTC)	Path length	Comments/Damage
Turkey
FU	N/A	Mağaracık	Hatay ili	36.11°N 35.93°E	17:00 (+/- 15 min.)	Unknown	This waterspout ended up coming onshore. No damage reported.
Sources: ESSL Severe Weather Database

== April ==
Confirmed tornadoes by Fujita rating
FU	F0	F1	F2	F3	F4	F5	Total
15	3	4	0	0	0	0	22

=== April 1 ===
List of confirmed tornadoes – Friday, April 1, 2022
F#	T#	Location	District/ County	Coord.	Time (UTC)	Path length	Comments/Damage
Italy
FU	N/A	Salerno / Salierno	Campania	40.67°N 14.76°E	15:40 (+/- 15 min.)	Unknown	No damage reported.
FU	N/A	Sabbioneta / Subiunèda	Lombardia	45.00°N 10.45°E	16:00 (+/- 5 min.)	Unknown	No damage occurred.
Sources: ESSL Severe Weather Database

=== April 2 ===
List of confirmed tornadoes – Saturday, April 2, 2022
F#	T#	Location	District/ County	Coord.	Time (UTC)	Path length	Comments/Damage
Italy
FU	N/A	Porto Torres / Posthudorra / Portu Turre	Sardegna / Sardhigna / Sardigna	40.84°N 8.42°E	10:00 (+/- 30 min.)	Unknown	No damage reported.
FU	N/A	Positano / Pasitano	Campania	40.62°N 14.48°E	10:45 (+/- 30 min.)	Unknown	No damage reported.
FU	N/A	Civitavecchia	Lazio	42.09°N 11.78°E	17:30 (+/- 15 min.)	Unknown	No damage reported.
France
FU	N/A	Piana (Corse-du-Sud)	Corse	42.23°N 8.63°E	12:00 (+/- 6 hrs.)	Unknown	No damage reported.
FU	N/A	Algajola (Haute-Corse)	Corse	42.62°N 8.87°E	14:00 (+/- 6 hrs.)	Unknown	No damage reported.
Croatia
FU	N/A	Pag / Pago / Baag	Zadarska	44.42°N 14.96°E	15:00 (+/- 5 min.)	Unknown	No damage reported.
Sources: ESSL Severe Weather Database

=== April 3 ===
List of confirmed tornadoes – Sunday, April 3, 2022
F#	T#	Location	District/ County	Coord.	Time (UTC)	Path length	Comments/Damage
Italy
FU	N/A	Spotorno / Spoturnu	Liguria / Ligûria	44.23°N 8.42°E	20:45 (+/- 5 min.)	Unknown	No damage reported.
Sources: ESSL Severe Weather Database

=== April 6 ===
List of confirmed tornadoes – Wednesday, April 6, 2022
F#	T#	Location	District/ County	Coord.	Time (UTC)	Path length	Comments/Damage
Wales / United Kingdom
F1	T3	Pennal	Gwynedd	52.58°N 3.92°E	09:10 (+/- 30 min.)	Unknown	Multiple trees snapped and uprooted in Gogarth Hall Farm and in a local forest. At least one roof significantly damaged.
Sources: ESSL Severe Weather Database

=== April 7 ===
List of confirmed tornadoes – Thursday, April 7, 2022
F#	T#	Location	District/ County	Coord.	Time (UTC)	Path length	Comments/Damage
Turkey
F1	N/A	Göynük	Bolu ili	40.39°N 30.78°E	16:40 (+/- 30 min.)	Unknown	Damage to trees. 2 police cars damaged by trees falling on them. Several roofs damaged, especially roof of a local high school. A street lamp has been downed.
Poland
F1	N/A	Sławsk	Wielkopolskie	52.20°N 18.12°E	18:48 (+/- 5 min.)	0.31 km max. path width 67 m	Numerous trees downed, snapped and twisted in a local forest. Roofs of a house and an outbuilding have been damaged.
Sources: ESSL Severe Weather Database; Göynük'ü hortum vurdu; Göynük'te hortumun ardından hasar tespit çalışmaları sürüyor

=== April 10 ===
List of confirmed tornadoes – Sunday, April 10, 2022
F#	T#	Location	District/ County	Coord.	Time (UTC)	Path length	Comments/Damage
Italy
FU	N/A	Capri	Campania	40.56°N 14.29°E	13:30 (+/- 15 min.)	Unknown	No damage reported.
Sources: ESSL Severe Weather Database

=== April 11 ===
List of confirmed tornadoes – Monday, April 11, 2022
F#	T#	Location	District/ County	Coord.	Time (UTC)	Path length	Comments/Damage
Turkey
FU	N/A	Alanya	Antalya ili	36.54°N 31.97°E	09:30 (+/- 15 min.)	Unknown	No damage reported.
Sources: ESSL Severe Weather Database

=== April 19 ===
List of confirmed tornadoes – Tuesday, April 19, 2022
F#	T#	Location	District/ County	Coord.	Time (UTC)	Path length	Comments/Damage
Turkey
F0	N/A	Denizkent, Denizyaka	Antalya ili	36.84°N 31.18°E	06:30 (+/- 1 hrs.)	Unknown	A waterspout that came onshore. Crops have been damaged or destroyed. Greenhouses' coverings damaged and torn off in some places, glass windows smashed, frames damaged and partially collapsed. Two cows have been reported to have been lifted off of the ground.
Sources: ESSL Severe Weather Database

=== April 20 ===
List of confirmed tornadoes – Wednesday, April 20, 2022
F#	T#	Location	District/ County	Coord.	Time (UTC)	Path length	Comments/Damage
Spain
FU	N/A	Torrevieja	Comunidad Valenciana / Comunitat Valenciana	37.95°N 0.68°E	06:15 (+/- 30 min.)	Unknown	No damage reported.
Sources: ESSL Severe Weather Database

=== April 22 ===
List of confirmed tornadoes – Friday, April 22, 2022
F#	T#	Location	District/ County	Coord.	Time (UTC)	Path length	Comments/Damage
Portugal
F1	T2	Santa Margarida da Coutada	Região do Centro	39.46°N 8.32°E	15:30 (+/- 15 min.)	1.5 km	Roads impassable. Trees snapped and downed. Power and telecommunication lines snapped and downed. Damage to roofs.
Sources: ESSL Severe Weather Database

=== April 23 ===
List of confirmed tornadoes – Saturday, April 23, 2022
F#	T#	Location	District/ County	Coord.	Time (UTC)	Path length	Comments/Damage
France
FU	N/A	Cannes (Alpes-Maritimes)	Provence-Alpes-Côte d'Azur	43.55°N 7.02°E	05:40 (+/- 15 min.)	Unknown	No damage reported.
F0	N/A	Saint-Raphaël (Var)	Provence-Alpes-Côte d'Azur		15:40 (+/- 15 min.)	0.25 km	A few broken branches, including one that damaged a catenary, paralyzing rail traffic for several days.
Sources: ESSL Severe Weather Database , Keraunos Database

=== April 25 ===
List of confirmed tornadoes – Monday, April 25, 2022
F#	T#	Location	District/ County	Coord.	Time (UTC)	Path length	Comments/Damage
France
FU	N/A	Marigny-Marmande (Indre-et-Loire)	Centre-Val de Loire	46.98°N 0.48°E	15:30 (+/- 15 min.)	Unknown	No damage reported.
Sources: ESSL Severe Weather Database

=== April 26 ===
List of confirmed tornadoes – Tuesday, April 26, 2022
F#	T#	Location	District/ County	Coord.	Time (UTC)	Path length	Comments/Damage
Germany
F0	N/A	Kandel	Rheinland-Pfalz / Rhoilond-Palz	49.09°N 8.19°E	10:25 (+/- 1 min.)	1.1 km max. path width 10 m	Field covers lifted and whirled in the air, some of them hit a power line and the resulting short circuit burned them in half. A cyclist has been slightly injured when the tornado knocked her bike.
Italy
FU	N/A	Genova / Zêna	Liguria / Ligûria	44.38°N 9.04°E	13:15 (+/- 5 min.)	Unknown	No damage reported.
Sources: ESSL Severe Weather Database

== May ==
Confirmed tornadoes by Fujita rating
FU	F0	F1	F2	F3	F4	F5	Total
16	5	5	3	0	0	0	31

=== May 2 ===
List of confirmed tornadoes – Monday, May 2, 2022
F#	T#	Location	District/ County	Coord.	Time (UTC)	Path length	Comments/Damage
Italy
FU	N/A	Bari / Bare	Puglia	41.15°N 16.81°E	08:00 (+/- 30 min.)	Unknown	No damage reported
Spain
FU	N/A	La Herreña	Región de Murcia	37.97°N 1.58°E	14:30 (+/- 1 hr.)	Unknown	Large tree branches broken, Trees uprooted or snapped, Crops/farmland damaged
Sources: ESSL Severe Weather Database

=== May 3 ===
List of confirmed tornadoes – Tuesday, May 3, 2022
F#	T#	Location	District/ County	Coord.	Time (UTC)	Path length	Comments/Damage
Hungary
FU	N/A	Jászboldogháza	Jász-Nagykun-Szolnok	47.37°N 20.00°E	14:00 (+/- 30 min.)	Unknown	No damage reported.
FU	N/A	Karcag	Jász-Nagykun-Szolnok	47.30°N 20.80°E	14:45 (+/- 30 min.)	Unknown	No damage reported.
Sources: ESSL Severe Weather Database

=== May 4 ===
List of confirmed tornadoes – Wednesday, May 4, 2022
F#	T#	Location	District/ County	Coord.	Time (UTC)	Path length	Comments/Damage
Austria
FU	N/A	Ottenthal	Niederösterreich / Niedaöstareich / Dolné Rakúsko / Dolní Rakousy	48.47°N 15.90°E	13:50 (+/- 15 min.)	Unknown	Crop and farmland damage reported.
France
FU	N/A	Landersheim	Grand Est	47.30°N 20.80°E	14:00 (+/- 15 min.)	Unknown	Large tree branches broken.
Sources: ESSL Severe Weather Database

=== May 5 ===
List of confirmed tornadoes – Thursday, May 5, 2022
F#	T#	Location	District/ County	Coord.	Time (UTC)	Path length	Comments/Damage
Turkey
FU	N/A	Çaylarbaşı	Şanlıurfa ili / Parêzgeha Rihayê	37.71°N 39.01°E	11:30 (+/- 15 min.)	Unknown	No damage reported.
France
FU	N/A	Île du Levant	Provence-Alpes-Côte d'Azur / Provença-Aups-Còsta d'Azur	43.04°N 6.51°E	14:10 (+/- 30 min.)	Unknown	No damage reported.
Sources: ESSL Severe Weather Database

=== May 7 ===
List of confirmed tornadoes – Saturday, May 7, 2022
F#	T#	Location	District/ County	Coord.	Time (UTC)	Path length	Comments/Damage
Netherlands
FU	N/A	Wehl	Gelderland / Guelders	51.96°N 6.21°E	12:30 (+/- 15 min.)	Unknown	No damage reported.
Sources: ESSL Severe Weather Database

=== May 11 ===
List of confirmed tornadoes – Wednesday, May 11, 2022
F#	T#	Location	District/ County	Coord.	Time (UTC)	Path length	Comments/Damage
Russia
FU	N/A	Новомихайловский (Novomikhaylovsky)	Краснодарский край (Krasnodarskiy Kray)	44.24°N 38.79°E	08:25 (+/- 3 hrs.)	Unknown	No damage reported.
Sources: ESSL Severe Weather Database

=== May 12 ===
List of confirmed tornadoes – Thursday, May 12, 2022
F#	T#	Location	District/ County	Coord.	Time (UTC)	Path length	Comments/Damage
Russia
F1	T3	Лужицы (Luzhitsy), Норкино (Norkino)	Пско́вская о́бласть (Pskóvskaya óblast')	56.677°N 29.01°E	12:00 (+/- 30 min.)	Unknown	The tornado damaged the roofs of a few houses and outbuildings, knocked down and uprooted trees, and caused road closures in the immediate area.
FU	N/A	Фатеж (Fatezh)	Курская о́бласть (Kurskaya óblast')	52.09°N 35.86°E	17:30 (+/- 5 min.)	Unknown	No damage reported.
Ukraine
FU	N/A	Мартусівка (Martusivka)	Київська область (Kyyivsʹka oblastʹ)	50.30°N 30.89°E	17:30 (+/- 30 min.)	Unknown	No damage reported.
Sources: ESSL Severe Weather Database

=== May 14 ===
List of confirmed tornadoes – Saturday, May 14, 2022
F#	T#	Location	District/ County	Coord.	Time (UTC)	Path length	Comments/Damage
Bulgaria
FU	N/A	Плиска (Pliska) / Пльсковъ (Plĭskovŭ)	Област Шумен (Oblast Shumen)	43.37°N 27.12°E	12:00 UTC (+/- 15 min.)	Unknown	No damage reported.
Sources: ESSL Severe Weather Database

=== May 16 ===
List of confirmed tornadoes – Monday, May 16, 2022
F#	T#	Location	District/ County	Coord.	Time (UTC)	Path length	Comments/Damage
Russia
F0	N/A	Беково (Bekovo)	Пензенская область (Penzenskaya oblast')	52.46°N 43.71°E	10:20 (+/- 5 min.)	Unknown	Few houses with mildly damaged roofs. Several trees uprooted.
United Kingdom
FU	N/A	Dallowgill	North Yorkshire	54.14°N 1.72°E	18:30 (+/- 15 min.)	Unknown	No damage reported.
Sources: ESSL Severe Weather Database

=== May 17 ===
List of confirmed tornadoes – Tuesday, May 17, 2022
F#	T#	Location	District/ County	Coord.	Time (UTC)	Path length	Comments/Damage
Russia
FU	N/A	Старый Токмак (Staryy Tokmak)	Татарстан (Tatarstan)	55.38°N 51.98°E	06:42 (+/- 1 min.)	Unknown	No damage reported.
Czech Republic
F0	N/A	Borek	Pardubický kraj	50.13°N 15.86°E	14:55 (+/- 5 min.)	Unknown	No damage or injuries reported.
Sources: ESSL Severe Weather Database

=== May 19 ===
List of confirmed tornadoes – Thursday, May 19, 2022
F#	T#	Location	District/ County	Coord.	Time (UTC)	Path length	Comments/Damage
Russia
F0	N/A	Кзыл-Ялан (Kzyl-Yalan)	Татарстан (Tatarstan)	55.26°N 50.70°E	8:00 (+/- 3 hrs.)	Unknown	Damage to roofs and chimneys of four houses.
Sources: ESSL Severe Weather Database

=== May 20 (Central Europe tornado outbreak) ===
List of confirmed tornadoes – Friday, May 20, 2022
F#	T#	Location	District/ County	Coord.	Time (UTC)	Path length	Comments/Damage
Russia
F0	N/A	Ilovlya	Volgograd	49.30°N 5.80°E	11:25 (+/- 5 min.)	Unknown	Brief tornado damaged few roofs of houses.
Netherlands
F1	N/A	Beek	Limburg	50.94°N 5.80°E	12:10 (+/- 15 min.)	Unknown	Damage reported in Beek, Spaubeek, and Schinnen. One roof partly collapsed, and multiple other roofs were damaged (rooftiles/roofing blown off). Multiple trees were downed, and many branches were blown off. Cars dented, and car windows and windshields broken.
Germany
F2	N/A	Lippstadt	Nordrhein-Westfalen	50.94°N 5.80°E	14:35 (+/- 5 min.)	13.4 km, max. width 950m	Large, damaging tornado observed in Lippstadt. Heavy damage to trees, cars and buildings. Cars damaged beyond repair. Large trees uprooted and branches broken, and roofs destroyed.
F2	N/A	Paderborn	Nordrhein-Westfalen	51.72°N 8.75°E	15:10 (+/- 5 min.)	23.5 km, max. width 400m	Damaging tornado in Paderborn. Damages include roads impassible, cars damaged beyond repair, trucks and/or trailers overturned, trees uprooted or snapped. 43 people were injured, 13 of whom sustained serious injuries.
FU	N/A	Hillscheid	Rheinland-Pfalz	50.40°N 7.70°E	15:30 (+/- 5 min.)	Unknown	Rain-wrapped tornado confirmed by video recordings reported in the Hillscheid area. Damage to roof and chimney, and trees uprooted and snapped.
F1	T2	Herford	Nordrhein-Westfalen	52.13°N 8.68°E	15:31 (+/- 1 min.)	0.65 km, width 90m	Short lived, damaging tornado in Herford. Cars dented, windows and windshields broken. Many instances of damage to roofs and chimneys.
F1	T3	Abtsgmünd	Baden-Württemberg	48.88°N 10.00°E	15:35 (+/- 5 min.)	6 km, max width. 400m	Heavy tree damage, with forest damaged/destroyed.
F1	T3	Lütmarsen	Nordrhein-Westfalen	51.78°N 9.35°E	16:00 (+/- 5 min.)	8 km, max width. 340m	Tornado damaged several roofs extensively and uprooted/snapped dozens of trees in Ovenhausen and Lütmarsen. Unspecified car damage was also reported. Two people were injured in relation to this tornado.
F2	T4	Merxhausen	Niedersachsen	51.82°N 9.64°E	16:10 (+/- 5 min.)	11.2 km, max. width 750m	Considerable damage in Merxhausen, damaged roofs and windows, cars dented. Heavy tree damage. 1 person was injured.

=== May 24 ===
List of confirmed tornadoes – Tuesday, May 24, 2022
F#	T#	Location	District/ County	Coord.	Time (UTC)	Path length	Comments/Damage
Italy
F1	N/A	Asigliano Vercellese	Piemonte	45.26°N 8.40°E	15:20 (+/- 5 min.)	Unknown	Heavy tree damage reported in a forest.

=== May 26 ===
List of confirmed tornadoes – Thursday, May 26, 2022
F#	T#	Location	District/ County	Coord.	Time (UTC)	Path length	Comments/Damage
Estonia
F0	N/A	Mädapea	Lääne-Virumaa	59.32°N 26.25°E	15:00 (+/- 15 min.)	Unknown	Brief tornado caused the partial collapse of a building.

=== May 27 ===
List of confirmed tornadoes – Friday, May 27, 2022
F#	T#	Location	District/ County	Coord.	Time (UTC)	Path length	Comments/Damage
Poland
F0	T1	Branica	Masovian Voivodeship	51.59°N 20.91°E	18:52 (+/- 5 min.)	Unknown	Several slightly damaged roofs, downed trees and tree branches. Power lines and killed storks were also reported.

== June ==
Confirmed tornadoes by Fujita rating
FU	F0	F1	F2	F3	F4	F5	Total
39	7	3	1	0	0	0	49

=== June 1 ===
List of confirmed tornadoes – Tuesday, June 1, 2022
F#	T#	Location	District/ County	Coord.	Time (UTC)	Path length	Comments/Damage
Poland
FU	N/A	Dziećmarów	Opolskie	50.20°N 17.93°E	09:15 (+/- 15 min.)	N/A	Eyewitnesses observed a tornado near Pawłowiczki and Baborów
Germany
FU	N/A	Glauburg	Niedersachsen	53.38°N 9.00°E	12:44 (+/- 5 min.)	N/A	Storm spotters via DWD observed a brief tornado.
Turkey
F0	N/A	İmişehir	Eskişehir Province	39.68°N 30.77°E	15:03 (± 5 min.)	N/A	Crops and greenhouses were damaged or destroyed by this brief tornado
Sources: ESSL Severe Weather Database

=== June 5 ===
List of confirmed tornadoes – Sunday, June 5, 2022
F#	T#	Location	District/ County	Coord.	Time (UTC)	Path length	Comments/Damage
France
F0	N/A	Velleguindry-et-Levrecey (Haute-Saône)	Bourgogne-Franche-Comté	47.55°N 6.10°E	17:00 (± 15 min.)	0.4 km	Fifteen houses slightly damaged, mainly at the level of the roofs, and some broken branches.
Sources: ESSL Severe Weather Database , Keraunos Database
Germany
F0	T1	Elbgrund	Hessen		18:00 (+/- 15 min.)	>0.4 km	
Sources: TornadoMap

=== June 7 ===
List of confirmed tornadoes – Tuesday, June 7, 2022
F#	T#	Location	District/ County	Coord.	Time (UTC)	Path length	Comments/Damage
Italy
F0	N/A	Frassinoro	Emilia-Romagna	44.30°N 10.57°E	12:25 (+/- 5 min.)	~0.3 km	A rain wrapped tornado ripped off sheets of metal from roofs and broke large tree branches.
Sources: ESSL Severe Weather Database

=== June 9 ===
List of confirmed tornadoes – Thursday, June 9, 2022
F#	T#	Location	District/ County	Coord.	Time (UTC)	Path length	Comments/Damage
Italy
FU	N/A	Amantea	Calabria	39.10°N 16.08°E	12:40 (+/- 15 min.)	Unknown	No damage observed.
FU	N/A	Amantea	Calabria	39.09°N 16.08°E	12:40 (+/- 15 min.)	Unknown	No damage observed.
FU	N/A	Busnago	Lombardia	45.62°N 9.48°E	14:00 (+/- 5 min.)	Unknown	No damage observed.
FU	N/A	Massa	Toscana	44.00°N 26.50°E	16:25 (+/- 5 min.)	Unknown	Umbrellas and lawnchairs picked up by landfalling, uncondensed waterspout. Two people were injured.
Sources: ESSL Severe Weather Database

=== June 10 ===
List of confirmed tornadoes – friday, June 10, 2022
F#	T#	Location	District/ County	Coord.	Time (UTC)	Path length	Comments/Damage
Italy
FU	N/A	Melendugno	Apulia	40.30°N 18.41°E	04:00 (+/- 30 min.)	Unknown	No damage observed.
FU	N/A	Vibo Valentia	Calabria	38.71°N 16.12°E	05:00 (+/- 15 min.)	Unknown	No damage observed.
FU	N/A	Molfetta	Apulia	41.21°N 16.59°E	06:00 (+/- 30 min.)	Unknown	No damage observed.
FU	N/A	Bari	Apulia	41.12°N 16.90°E	06:00 (+/- 15 min.)	Unknown	No damage observed.
FU	N/A	Fasano	Apulia	40.89°N 17.39°E	06:45 (+/- 15 min.)	Unknown	No damage observed.
FU	N/A	Ricadi	Calabria	38.62°N 15.83°E	09:00 (+/- 30 min.)	Unknown	No damage observed.
FU	N/A	Milazzo	Sicily	38.62°N 15.23°E	15:16 (+/- 5 min.)	Unknown	No damage observed.
F0	N/A	Milazzo	Sicily	38.18°N 15.21°E	15:20 (+/- 1 min.)	Unknown	Boats were flipped over, dragged & damaged
Greece
F1	T3	Neo Sidirochori	Rodopi	41.02°N 25.36°E	07:10 (+/- 15 min.)	Unknown	Sheet metal roof ripped off, Trees uprooted or lost large branches & heavy trailers weighing 7.5 tons were overturned. The tornado caused power outages as well
FU	N/A	Loútsa	Préveza	39.20°N 20.52°E	10:50 (+/- 5 min.)	Unknown	No damage observed.
FU	N/A	Loútsa	Préveza	39.20°N 20.53°E	10:50 (+/- 5 min.)	Unknown	No damage observed.
FU	N/A	Oreoí	Euboea	38.95°N 23.10°E	11:15 (+/- 5 min.)	Unknown	No damage observed.
FU	N/A	Kanálion	Préveza	39.06°N 20.70°E	12:45 (+/- 5 min.)	Unknown	No damage observed.
FU	N/A	Agiokampos	Évvoia	38.93°N 23.04°E	13:38 (+/- 5 min.)	Unknown	No damage observed.
FU	N/A	Néa Moudhaniá	Chalkidiki	40.24°N 23.29°E	17:58 (+/- 1 min.)	Unknown	No damage observed.
Bulgaria
FU	N/A	Kabile	Yambol	42.53°N 26.50°E	14:30 (+/- 15 min.)	Unknown	No damage observed.
Sources: ESSL Severe Weather Database

=== June 12 ===
List of confirmed tornadoes – Sunday, June 12, 2022
F#	T#	Location	District/ County	Coord.	Time (UTC)	Path length	Comments/Damage
Greece
FU	N/A	Iráklion	Heraklion	35.33°N 25.28°E	05:51 (+/- 1 min.)	Unknown	No damage observed.
FU	N/A	Lefkáda	Lefkás	38.83°N 20.70°E	16:40 (+/- 5 min.)	Unknown	No damage observed.
Sources: ESSL Severe Weather Database

=== June 13 ===
List of confirmed tornadoes – Monday, June 13, 2022
F#	T#	Location	District/ County	Coord.	Time (UTC)	Path length	Comments/Damage
Russia
FU	N/A	Rybinsk Reservoir	Jaroslavl	58.28°N 38.54°E	15:30 (+/- 30 min.)	Unknown	No damage observed.
Czech Republic
F1	N/A	Lanžhot	Jihomoravsky kraj	48.73°N 16.97°E	16:31 (+/- 1 min.)	1.1 km	More than 30 homes were damaged by a short lived tornado. Several roofs were severely damaged & trees were uprooted or snapped
Sources: ESSL Severe Weather Database

=== June 14 ===
List of confirmed tornadoes – Tuesday, June 14, 2022
F#	T#	Location	District/ County	Coord.	Time (UTC)	Path length	Comments/Damage
Russia
FU	N/A	Kuznetsovo	Altayskiy Kray	51.68°N 82.02°E	08:30 (+/- 5 min.)	Unknown	Landspout with no damage observed.
Sources: ESSL Severe Weather Database

=== June 15 ===
List of confirmed tornadoes – Wednesday, June 15, 2022
F#	T#	Location	District/ County	Coord.	Time (UTC)	Path length	Comments/Damage
Russia
FU	N/A	Temryuk	Krasnodarskiy Kray	45.20°N 37.40°E	10:55 (+/- 15 min.)	Unknown	Landspout with no damage observed.
Sources: ESSL Severe Weather Database

=== June 16 ===
List of confirmed tornadoes – Wednesday, June 15, 2022
F#	T#	Location	District/ County	Coord.	Time (UTC)	Path length	Comments/Damage
Russia
FU	N/A	Nebug	Krasnodarskiy Kray	44.12°N 38.93°E	04:55 (+/- 15 min.)	Unknown	No damage observed.
Poland
FU	N/A	Drogobycza	Śląskie	50.66°N 19.00°E	14:02 (+/- 5 min.)	Unknown	Trees were downed.
Sources: ESSL Severe Weather Database

=== June 20 ===
List of confirmed tornadoes – Wednesday, June 15, 2022
F#	T#	Location	District/ County	Coord.	Time (UTC)	Path length	Comments/Damage
Germany
FU	N/A	Büsum	Schleswig-Holstein	54.13°N 8.84°E	04:00 (+/- 1 hours.)	Unknown	No damage observed.
FU	N/A	Ostseebad Kühlungsborn	Mecklenburg-Vorpommern	54.19°N 11.74°E	16:08 (+/- 1 min.)	Unknown	No damage observed.
FU	N/A	Ostseebad Kühlungsborn	Mecklenburg-Vorpommern	54.19°N 11.77°E	16:08 (+/- 1 min.)	Unknown	No damage observed.
Denmark
F0	N/A	Randlev	Odder Kommune	55.94°N 10.19°E	07:31 (+/- 5 min.)	Unknown	No damage observed
FU	N/A	Ørby	Syddjurs Kommune	56.12°N 10.46°E	07:55 (+/- 30 min.)	Unknown	No damage observed
FU	N/A	Kalundborg	Kalundborg Kommune	55.67°N 11.07°E	08:20 (+/- 15 min.)	Unknown	No damage observed
Russia
F1	N/A	Borodinsk	Orenburg	51.57°N 52.83°E	15:30 (+/- 5 min.)	Unknown	A tornado ripped off sheeting from homes, downed fences & downed trees. Some roofs were severely damaged, sustaining partial collapse.
Sources: ESSL Severe Weather Database

=== June 21 ===
List of confirmed tornadoes – Tuesday, June 21, 2022
F#	T#	Location	District/ County	Coord.	Time (UTC)	Path length	Comments/Damage
Spain
FU	N/A	Alcañiz	Aragón	41.05°N 0.13°W	14:00 (+/- 15 min.)	Unknown	Trees were downed & roofs were damaged
Sources: ESSL Severe Weather Database

=== June 22 ===
List of confirmed tornadoes – Wednesday, June 22, 2022
F#	T#	Location	District/ County	Coord.	Time (UTC)	Path length	Comments/Damage
Russia
FU	N/A	Sochi	Krasnodarskiy Kray	43.51°N 39.74°E	12:10 (+/- 30 min.)	Unknown	No damage reported
FU	N/A	Sochi	Krasnodarskiy Kray	43.54°N 39.72°E	12:10 (+/- 30 min.)	Unknown	No damage reported
FU	N/A	Sochi	Krasnodarskiy Kray	43.59°N 39.69°E	12:10 (+/- 30 min.)	Unknown	No damage reported
F0	T1	Lazarevskoye	Krasnodarskiy Kray	43.91°N 39.31°E	16:55 (+/- 15 min.)	Unknown	Waterspout hit land, damaging a pier.
France
FU	N/A	Guern (Morbihan)	Bretagne	48.03°N 3.08°E	18:00 (+/- 3 hours.)	Unknown	No damage reported
Sources: ESSL Severe Weather Database , Keraunos Database

=== June 23 ===
List of confirmed tornadoes – Thursday, June 23, 2022
F#	T#	Location	District/ County	Coord.	Time (UTC)	Path length	Comments/Damage
France
F2	N/A	Lajo (Lozère)	Occitanie		14:50 (+/- 15 min.)	3.1 km	This tornado is the most intense recorded for the Cévennes, with an average altitude of 1250 m. It is one of the highest altitude tornadoes observed in France. It ravaged no less than 4 hectares of forest, and caused moderate damage to several homes and agricultural buildings. It is also one of the only 3 tornadoes observed in the department of Lozère since 1900.
Sources: Keraunos Database

== July ==
Confirmed tornadoes by Fujita rating
FU	F0	F1	F2	F3	F4	F5	Total
-	-	1	-	-	-	-	1

=== July 25 ===
List of confirmed tornadoes – Monday, July 25, 2022
F#	T#	Location	District/ County	Coord.	Time (UTC)	Path length	Comments/Damage
Germany
F1	N/A	Tressau	Bayern		21:30 (+/- 15 min.)	>0.8 km	
Sources: TornadoMap

== August ==
Confirmed tornadoes by Fujita rating
FU	F0	F1	F2	F3	F4	F5	Total
-	2	2	-	-	-	-	4

=== August 14 ===
List of confirmed tornadoes – Sunday, August 14, 2022
F#	T#	Location	District/ County	Coord.	Time (UTC)	Path length	Comments/Damage
France
F0	N/A	Frontignan (Hérault)	Occitanie		07:40 (+/- 5 min.)	1.3 km	About forty homes affected: collapsed chimneys, bent aerials, flying tiles, bare roofs, sections of fence walls or gratings on the ground; remote projections of objects offering strong wind resistance (toys, garden furniture, trampoline, sheet metal).
Sources: Keraunos Database

=== August 18 ===
List of confirmed tornadoes – Thursday, August 18, 2022
F#	T#	Location	District/ County	Coord.	Time (UTC)	Path length	Comments/Damage
Germany
F1	T2	Angermünde	Brandenburg		17:35 (+/- 15 min.)	>0.3 km	
Sources: TornadoMap

=== August 26 ===
List of confirmed tornadoes – Friday, August 26, 2022
F#	T#	Location	District/ County	Coord.	Time (UTC)	Path length	Comments/Damage
Germany
F1	T2	Kronsmoor	Schleswig-Holstein		17:48 (+/- 5 min.)	>1.0 km	
Sources: TornadoMap

=== August 31 ===
List of confirmed tornadoes – Wednesday, August 31, 2022
F#	T#	Location	District/ County	Coord.	Time (UTC)	Path length	Comments/Damage
France
F0	N/A	Valmy (Marne)	Grand Est		15:30 (+/- 5 min.)	1.2 km	The phenomenon takes a few motorists by surprise, but the damage is extremely limited.
Sources: Keraunos Database

== September ==
Confirmed tornadoes by Fujita rating
FU	F0	F1	F2	F3	F4	F5	Total
123 (Note: Mainly waterspouts, not tornadoes.)	9	17	2	1	0	0	152

=== September 7 ===
List of confirmed tornadoes – Wednesday, september 7, 2022
F#	T#	Location	District/ County	Coord.	Time (UTC)	Path length	Comments/Damage
France
F1	N/A	Clavières (Cantal)	Auvergne-Rhône-Alpes		15:00 (+/- 90 min.)	Unknown	Uprooted or cut trees; a damaged roof (portion of roofing swept away over approximately 400 m²) and projection of debris at a short distance; a twisted and overturned concrete electric pole.
Sources: Keraunos Database

=== September 14 ===
List of confirmed tornadoes – Wednesday, September 14, 2022
F#	T#	Location	District/ County	Coord.	Time (UTC)	Path length	Comments/Damage
Germany
F1	N/A	Büchenbeuren	Rheinland-Pfalz		17:40 (+/- 5 min.)	>0.6 km	
Sources: TornadoMap

=== September 16 ===
List of confirmed tornadoes – Friday, September 16, 2022
F#	T#	Location	District/ County	Coord.	Time (UTC)	Path length	Comments/Damage
Lithuania
F1	N/A	Balsėnai	Klaipėda County		17:12	N/A	A tornado was observed. Rated IF1 on the International Fujita Scale

=== September 18 (Russia-Ukraine Tornado Outbreak) ===
List of confirmed tornadoes – Sunday, September 18, 2022
F#	T#	Location	District/ County	Coord.	Time (UTC)	Path length	Comments/Damage
Russia
FU	N/A	Donskoye	Kaliningrad Oblast		07:30 ± 30 min	Unknown	A rope tornado was sighted and caught on video in the Donskoye area. No known damage occurred.
F1	N/A	Ol'govka	Kursk Oblast	51.40°N 35.02°E	15:05 ± 15 min	Unknown	A high-end F1 tornado caused major damage to structures in the village of Ol'govka. Numerous residential buildings were damaged, most of which were poorly built homes.
F2	T5	L'gov, Prigorodnaya Slobodka	Kursk Oblast	51.69°N 35.30°E	15:30 ± 30 min	Unknown	Over 200 structures were damaged or destroyed as a result of this strong wedge tornado. Many residential structures had roofs torn off, and some sustained collapse of their exterior walls, but most of these structures were poorly built homes. Numerous trees were downed, and high-voltage power lines were also damaged or destroyed.
F1	N/A	Kursk	Kursk Oblast	51.67°N 36.08°E	17:00 ± 30 min	Unknown	2 deaths — This high-end F1 tornado impacted an automotive technical college in the city, causing significant damage as the roof of a dormitory building was torn off. Other buildings suffered roof damage, cars were damaged by flying debris and falling trees, and streets were left strewn with debris. A student was killed after being struck in the abdomen by a piece of roof, which entered through a nearby window. The student was reportedly filming the tornado during that time. Another victim was found under a downed tree near the college.
Ukraine
F3	N/A	Buryn'	Sumy Oblast	51.20°N 33.85°E	13:30 ± 15 min	15.6 km	1 death — The tornado caused significant damage to the city of Buryn, where many homes and apartment buildings sustained major structural damage. Many residential buildings had their roofs torn off, and several had destroyed exterior walls. One fatality occurred when a wall fell onto a person. Many trees were snapped and stripped of limbs, cars were tossed, and metal pylons were toppled along a set of railroad tracks. A gas station was also damaged, and debris was scattered throughout the damage path. About 10,000 customers were left without electricity, and eight injuries occurred from this tornado. The European Severe Storms Laboratory initially rated this tornado F2, though it was upgraded to F3 on September 21, based on severe structural damage to well-built brick buildings.
F2	N/A	Zinovo	Sumy Oblast		13:45 ± 30 min	Unknown	Homes and other buildings were damaged, some of which had roofs torn off. Numerous large trees were snapped or uprooted in wooded areas, and large power line pylons were bent.
F1	N/A	Shurovo	Sumy Oblast	51.23°N 33.98°E	13:45 ± 30 min	Unknown	The tornado damaged or destroyed power and telecommunication lines. Homes sustained major damage to their roofs, and many trees were snapped or uprooted.
Sources: ESSL Severe Weather Database

=== September 19 (Russia-Ukraine Tornado Outbreak) ===
List of confirmed tornadoes – Monday, September 19, 2022
F#	T#	Location	District/ County	Coord.	Time (UTC)	Path length	Comments/Damage
Russia
F2	N/A	Svecha	Kirov Oblast	58.28°N 47.33°E	14:20 ± 15 min	Unknown	A strong tornado occurred in a forest, flattening a swath of trees. Large branches were broken, large trees were snapped or uprooted, and roads were left closed and impassible.
Sources: ESSL Severe Weather Database

== October ==
Confirmed tornadoes by Fujita rating
FU	F0	F1	F2	F3	F4	F5	Total
-	2	2	1	1	-	-	6

=== October 1 ===
List of confirmed tornadoes – Saturday, October 1, 2022
F#	T#	Location	District/ County	Coord.	Time (UTC)	Path length	Comments/Damage
Germany
F0	T1	Drewer	Nordrhein-Westfalen		15:10 (+/- 5 min.)	>3.5 km	
Sources: TornadoMap

=== October 16 ===
List of confirmed tornadoes – Sunday, October 16, 2022
F#	T#	Location	District/ County	Coord.	Time (UTC)	Path length	Comments/Damage
Norway
F1	N/A	Sandve	Rogaland		03:35 (+/- 15 min.)	0.7 km	An F1/IF1 tornado started as a waterspout, making landfall NE of sandve, sweeping away a poorly built sheep barn & damaging the roof of an ocean lodge. This tornado was part of the 2022 baltic sea/scandinavia derecho.
F1	N/A	Brevikstranda	Telemark		09:55 (+/- 15 min.)	Unknown	an F1/IF1 hit Brevikstranda, blowing away a playhouse & snapping or uprooting svereal trees. This tornado was part of the 2022 baltic sea/scandinavia derecho.

=== October 20 ===
List of confirmed tornadoes – Thursday, October 20, 2022
F#	T#	Location	District/ County	Coord.	Time (UTC)	Path length	Comments/Damage
France
F1	N/A	Herbignac (Loire-Atlantique)	Pays-de-la-Loire		15:30 (+/- 5 min.)	1.0 km	Trees of all sizes uprooted or broken; branches carried away a short distance; knocked down telephone poles and torn wires; small portions of house roofs washed away and ridges torn off; remote garden elements (fences, chalets, pergola, deckchairs); carport of a blown motorhome; throwing trash cans
Sources: Keraunos Database

=== 23 October event ===
List of confirmed tornadoes – Sunday, 23 October 2022 (Note: All dates are based on the local time zone where the tornado touched down; however, all times are in Coordinated Universal Time for consistency.)
IF#	Location	Region	Country	Start coord.	Time (UTC)	Path length	Max. width
IF0.5	Northern Concarneau	Brittany	France		~11:30	0.9 km (0.56 mi)	80 m (87 yd)
IF0.5	A very weak tornado touched down in the northern part of Concarneau in Finistère. It uprooted and snapped numerous small trees, and large limbs of both coniferous and deciduous trees were split or torn. Three telephone poles were sheared through, and two garden shed roofs were torn off, with one of those roofs thrown about 200 m (220 yd) from its original position. The damage was limited and primarily affected vegetation and lightweight structures along the tornado’s short path through the northern outskirts of Concarneau. This tornado was rated EF0 by KERAUNOS.						
IF2.5	SW of Lisieux to Beuzeville area to W of Quillebeuf-sur-Seine	Normandy	France		~14:00	47.6 km (29.6 mi)	500 m (550 yd)
IF2.5	This strong, long-track tornado moved across the Calvados and Eure départements in Normandy, producing damage over a lengthy and continuous path. The tornado first touched down southwest of Lisieux, where minor damage occurred, including broken tree branches, small trees uprooted, garden furniture displaced, roof tiles and slates dislodged, shed roofing torn away, and electrical poles knocked over by falling branches. As it moved northward, this pattern of light but consistent damage continued, with debris and tree fall directions indicating a well-defined damage corridor. From Coquainvilliers northward, the tornado strengthened, causing larger and sometimes centuries-old trees to be uprooted or snapped, orchards heavily damaged, wooden utility poles broken, and roofs increasingly damaged, with occasional brief lulls of its strength. The damage corridor widened with clear convergent damage signatures along the edges. Near Beuzeville, the tornado briefly intensified in strength and reached its peak width. In this area, numerous trees were uprooted or broken, roofs were torn off, and small buildings were damaged or partially collapsed. A residential home suffered major structural failure, with walls collapsing and the roof torn apart above the ceiling, largely due to failure of wooden framing and anchoring. The tornado crossed the A13, scattering branches onto the roadway, then passed through an industrial area where dozens of semi-trailers were tipped over or rolled, and the roof of a vehicle inspection building was partially blown off. Beyond this area, the tornado weakened back, though it remained broad. Along its continued path, a chip shop was lifted, a bungalow was rolled onto its roof, a tractor unit was overturned, and vegetation damage remained widespread. The tornado weakened further, producing tree damage, torn metal sheets, and light structural impacts before dissipating near the A131 close to Quillebeuf-sur-Seine. This tornado was rated EF2 by KERAUNOS.						
IF1	NE of Heudebouville to Muids to SW of Fresne-l'Archevêque	Normandy	France		~14:31	12.8 km (8.0 mi)	100 m (110 yd)
IF1	A tornado began in the Seine river valley initially causing damage by tearing branches from willows and poplars, followed by uprooting small trees and snapping large limbs as the tornado crossed the river and moved into Muids. The tornado briefly strengthened in Muids, where roof tiles were blown off homes and a section of sheet roofing was torn from a school canteen roof and carried about 40 m (44 yd). As it continued northeast, additional tiles were removed from a residence and tree damage persisted while the tornado climbed the northern slope of the Seine Valley, where numerous branches were torn off and some trees were knocked down, aided by steep terrain. The tornado appeared to pass just over La Roquette with little to no visible damage, then crossed open farmland before entering a wooded ravine where larger branches were split or broken. Beyond this area, damage became scattered and non-convergent, and no clear tornado track could be confirmed farther northeast. This tornado was rated EF1 by KERAUNOS.						
IF2	Eastern Barton on Sea to S of Lyndhurst	Hampshire	United Kingdom		~14:35	15 km (9.3 mi)	300 m (330 yd)
IF2	A strong waterspout moved ashore on the east side of Barton on Sea and became a tornado, producing sporadic light damage immediately near landfall, including roof tile damage to a house and a snapped tree. As the tornado moved inland across open ground and woodland, damage became more pronounced, with numerous tree branches snapped, trees twisted, and several trees felled, forming a clear but narrow damage corridor. The tornado intensified as it struck a farm, with a well-defined debris swath crossing fields, containing corrugated metal sheets, asbestos roofing fragments, and other building materials thrown up to 200 m (220 yd). Multiple barns suffered major roof loss, one barn experienced collapse of a brick wall, and another lost most of its roofing, while a telegraph pole was snapped and a brick wall was knocked down. Debris throw directions varied over short distances, indicating complex or multiple vortices, and nearby trees sustained severe snapping, marking the strongest damage along the track. Beyond this area, the tornado caused roof damage to garages and houses, felled or heavily damaged trees, and additional utility damage, though overall intensity fluctuated. Farther inland, greenhouses and polytunnels were severely damaged or destroyed, with glass scattered widely, metal frames twisted, and power lines brought down, including debris that gouged into a metal shed door. As the tornado crossed extensive woodland and heathland, damage became more intermittent but still included felled and topped trees, localized pockets of stronger tree damage, and multidirectional debris patterns suggesting brief embedded vortices. The tornado gradually weakened, producing light, scattered tree damage toward the northern end of its path before dissipating, with no clear structural damage beyond the final wooded areas. This tornado was rated T4 by TORRO.						
IF1.5	N of Fair Oak to E of Colden Common	Hampshire	United Kingdom		~15:05	3.75 km (2.33 mi)	110 m (120 yd)
IF1.5	A tornado began just north of Fair Oak, where only isolated twig and small branch damage was observed. As it moved into Horton Heath and toward nearby woodland, scattered tree damage continued, with snapped branches and minor impacts along a narrow damage path consistent with a weak vortex. South of the B2177, damage became more organized as a strip of maize was flattened while tree crowns were stripped and additional trees were damaged nearby. A large oak tree snapped several meters above the ground, and its fall partially demolished an outbuilding, while roof tiles were torn from a newly built structure and carried northward, indicating strengthening winds and cyclonic debris motion. North of the B2177, damage intensified at several rural properties where large, anchored stable buildings were lifted and thrown, some landing over 100 m (110 yd) away, destroying fencing and structures in their path. Numerous mature trees were felled or badly damaged, though nearby houses and brick buildings were left largely untouched, showing sharp variations in damage intensity across the path. As the tornado continued northward, trees along the track were snapped or uprooted, and video evidence confirmed a condensation funnel on the ground, though structural damage in this section was more limited. At Marwell Zoo, the tornado caused oak trees to fall across a car park, lamp posts to bend, and signposts to snap, with debris thrown northward and at least one vehicle sustaining a shattered windscreen. In Horsham Copse north of the zoo, the tornado produced widespread tree damage along a linear, rotating path, including snapped oak trees up to a meter in diameter. Farther north near Boyes Copse, damage weakened to minor treetop impacts, suggesting the tornado was dissipating near the end of its track. This tornado was rated T2/T3 by TORRO.						
IF0.5	SE of Timsbury to SE of King's Somborne	Hampshire	United Kingdom		~15:14	2 km (1.2 mi)	80 m (87 yd)
IF0.5	This short-lived tornado produced a narrow damage consisting entirely of minor tree damage. Trees were knocked down in varying directions, including some falling northward in a cyclonic pattern while others fell parallel to the track, with branches scattered across the area. No significant structural damage was observed, and the impacts were confined mainly to light vegetation damage before the tornado dissipated. This tornado was rated T4 by TORRO.						
IF2	NE of Morgny to Ferrières-en-Bray to Gaudechart to Conty to Tilloy-lès-Conty area	Hauts-de-France	France		~15:15	45 km (28 mi)	800 m (870 yd)
IF2	This strong, long-track tornado began near Bosquentin, where trees were uprooted, roofs were damaged, and wooden power poles were broken, marking the northwestern edge of the damage path. As the tornado widened and moved toward the Lyons Forest, it snapped and uprooted even sturdy trees, with branch throw increasing across a corridor while peripheral roof damage was noted well outside the core path. The tornado then entered the Seine-Maritime department, tearing metal sheets from farm buildings and causing severe forest damage with trees broken or uprooted, followed by lighter damage on nearby plateaus where shed roofing was removed. Farther north, branches were torn off and roof tiles blown away, during which the tornado briefly weakened. Crossing the D915 and the Epte, the tornado struck Ferrières-en-Bray, where house roofs were partially removed, industrial hangar roofs were torn away, a truck trailer was overturned, and trees were uprooted. The tornado continued northeast across the D930, producing snapped concrete power poles, scattered debris, and roof damage, before entering the Oise department. Across rural areas and woodlands, fields, meadows, and forests sustained widespread damage, with trees uprooted or broken and roofing materials blown off, while peripheral wind damage again affected areas well outside the main corridor. Near Songeons, terrain effects briefly intensified the tornado, causing severe structural damage, downed power infrastructure, roofs torn from homes and businesses, and extensive debris scatter, injuring a child struck by flying debris. The tornado then weakened temporarily before strengthening again as it crossed Gaudechart, where roofs were torn off, garage doors ripped away, trees uprooted, a barn was destroyed, and prefabricated school buildings were blown apart, with strong damage observed in the most affected areas. Beyond Gaudechart, the tornado weakened, though hangar roofs, house roofs, and trees were damaged in nearby communities, forcing closures along the D151 and later the D124 due to fallen trees and power lines. After crossing into the Somme department, the tornado intensified again through Belleuse and Conty, where numerous roofs were damaged or removed, large trees were uprooted, vehicles were displaced, utility poles were bent, and public buildings suffered severe roof loss. In Tilloy-lès-Conty, farm buildings were largely demolished, historic structures lost roofing, perimeter walls collapsed, and large trees snapped, before the tornado finally weakened north of the D210, where it flattened stands of trees over a narrowing corridor.						
IF1.5	NE of Michelmersh to Bransbury to W of Whitchurch	Hampshire	United Kingdom		~15:17	24 km (15 mi)	200 m (220 yd)
IF1.5	This tornado quickly developed, producing a clearly traceable but mostly light damage path. For several kilometers the tornado remained weak, marked by fallen oak branches, snapped limbs, and occasional trees toppled. As the tornado approached the Ashley area, tree damage became more frequent and organized, with multiple mature trees felled and branches thrown eastward, though the path remained relatively narrow. Near Up Somborne, the tornado strengthened sharply, destroying beehives, glasshouses, and a well-anchored polytunnel, while large tree tops were snapped and lofted tens of meters, debris was driven into the ground, and orchards suffered catastrophic losses. Nearby farms experienced extensive tree loss, buckled barn doors, minor roof damage, and snapped telegraph poles, cutting phone and internet service, with debris thrown well off the main axis. North of this area, damage gradually weakened, though a continuous trail of felled and damaged trees remained visible across farmland. Beyond the A30, the tornado narrowed again, producing light hedge and tree damage in exposed countryside. Farther north through Bransbury and Longparish, damage documented included felled trees, roof tile loss, and shed roof damage, with a more concentrated corridor of damage within a broader area of storm impacts. Near Hurstbourne Priors, the tornado produced significant damage, including snapped and felled trees, before weakening again. Along the B3048, a clearer damage swath showed trees snapped at height and falling northward. The tornado ended near St Mary’s Hill, where only minor roof tile loss and small branch damage were found, marking dissipation of the circulation. This tornado was rated T3 by TORRO.						
IF1	W of Querrieu to NE of Behencourt	Hauts-de-France	France		~15:55	11 km (6.8 mi)	100 m (110 yd)
IF1	A tornado moved through the Querrieu area, crossing the Amiens Golf Club, where it uprooted or snapped numerous trees, including birch, ash, willow, and oak, with damage patterns showing clear convergent and asymmetric debris fall typical of a fast-moving vortex. The core circulation passed across the golf course access area, parking lot, and nearby fairways and shifted slightly eastward. Tree damage remained continuous along the D929 and into the Querrieu Forest, then intensified again in the Corneillers Valley, where tall trees were snapped at the northwestern edge of the path and trees along the southeastern side were blown down toward the north or north-northeast, confirming strong rotational winds. Farther east, additional vegetation damage occurred in nearby communities as outflow winds spread away from the main circulation. In Fréchencourt, particularly in low-lying marsh areas, poplar trees were severed near the base, while trees on slightly higher ground suffered broken branches or partial uprooting, indicating weaker winds outside the core. Near Béhencourt, the tornado weakened with damage limited almost entirely to trees and branches. Rows of trees were lightly damaged and branches were torn off in rural areas before the tornado dissipated.						
IF3	N of Mesnil-Martinsart to Bihucourt to Hendecourt-lès-Cagnicourt	Hauts-de-France	France		14:48 - 17:20	206 km (128 mi)	1 km (1,100 yd)
IF3	See section on this tornado						
IF1	Eastern Welling	Greater London	United Kingdom		~16:25	2 km (1.2 mi)	300 m (330 yd)
IF1	This tornado tracked through the Welling area, producing a narrow damage path. Along its path, trees were snapped or uprooted, roofs of homes and outbuildings were damaged, and lightweight objects such as refuse bins were overturned. Damage became more sporadic toward the northern end of the track before the tornado dissipated.						
IF1.5	N of Écourt-Saint-Quentin to Arleux to Northern Erchin to Masny NE of Écaillon	Hauts-de-France	France		~16:50	11 km (6.8 mi)	500 m (550 yd)
IF1.5	A tornado began near Écourt-Saint-Quentin, initially causing minor vegetation damage and slight roof damage to a few houses with clear convergent tree fall patterns as it crossed the Sensée marshes, where willows and poplars were uprooted. Entering the Nord department, the tornado intensified while moving into Arleux, uprooting trees, damaging roofs. The most severe damage in Arleux occurred near the SNCF railway line between Douai and Cambrai, where fallen branches halted a train, and in a nearby housing estate where sections of roofs were blown off, garage roofs and doors were torn away, debris shattered vehicle glass, and a parked car was pushed several meters. Continuing northeast toward the D643, the tornado crossed wooded areas with a broad damage corridor and was filmed as a rain-wrapped circulation, blowing down signage and producing dangerous airborne debris. In Erchin, damage concentrated in the northern part of town, where roofs were partially removed, fences torn down, trees uprooted, and power poles knocked over, causing outages, with roof damage observed well outside the core path. The tornado then struck Masny, heavily impacting the Champ Fleuri housing estate, where flat-roofed homes lost large roof sections, garage roofs and doors were torn away, and numerous public buildings sustained damage. After crossing the D645, the tornado weakened gradually through Écaillon and toward Rieulay, producing weak damage including partial roof loss, uprooted trees, broken large branches, displaced garden furniture, and damage to a horticultural business. The tornado continued to weaken with fallen trees generally oriented toward the north or northeast becoming less common. The tornado affected areas on both sides of the D13 before finally lifting, ending its path with mainly vegetation damage.						
IF1.5	S of Mortagne-du-Nord, FR to Southern Leuze-en-Hainaut, BE	Hauts-de-France (FR), Hainaut (BE)	France, Belgium		~17:05	15 km (9.3 mi)	800 m (870 yd)
IF1.5	This tornado began near Mortagne-du-Nord, where trees were damaged near the confluence of the Scarpe and Scheldt rivers, then widened significantly as it moved toward Flines-lès-Mortagne, producing broken willow and poplar branches and other light vegetation damage across a broad corridor dominated by strong winds. Continuing toward Legies and Rouillon, trees were uprooted, minor damage occurred to houses, and power lines were torn down, briefly disrupting traffic, while eyewitnesses reported "violent" wind shaking vehicles and toppling large garden trees. The tornado entered Belgium near Callenelle, where damage intensified with trees uprooted or snapped, including rows of poplars broken at mid-height or near the base, and similar impacts near a railway line, a castle park, and agricultural land. Moving into Brasmenil, the tornado reached its peak width, causing widespread tree damage, roof loss on houses and farm sheds, and consistent debris fall toward the north or northeast. As it crossed the E42, tree branches were torn off, then in Braffe the tornado uprooted centuries-old trees, tore roofs from agricultural buildings, damaged a chapel by removing its cross, and caused roof damage to homes, with debris thrown considerable distances. Farther east along the N50, houses were damaged, trees uprooted, and electrical wires detached, before the tornado struck Willaupuis, where a very wide corridor of damage included severely damaged roofs, felled trees, and strong suction effects, even tearing structural elements from a village hall while nearby buildings were only lightly affected. Entering Vieux-Leuze, damage became more scattered and weakened, consisting mainly of stripped tree branches and isolated uprooted trees, before the circulation lost its organized, convergent damage pattern and dissipated.						
IF1	N of Ath to ESE of Lessines	Hainaut	Belgium		~17:25	10 km (6.2 mi)	200 m (220 yd)
IF1	This tornado touched down in Rebaix, producing localized but concentrated damage that included large tree branches broken or torn off, some of which fell onto vehicles, along with minor structural impacts. As the tornado continued northeastward beyond Rebaix, intermittent vegetation damage was observed across the countryside, with trees and large limbs broken or uprooted along a narrow and discontinuous path. The circulation persisted into Bois de Lessines, where additional tree damage was documented before it weakened and lifted.						

== November ==
Confirmed tornadoes by Fujita rating
FU	F0	F1	F2	F3	F4	F5	Total
6	5	4	1	0	0	0	16

=== November 1 ===
List of confirmed tornadoes – Tuesday, November 1, 2022
F#	T#	Location	District/ County	Coord.	Time (UTC)	Path length	Comments/Damage
France
FU	N/A	Penmarc'h	Finistère (Brittany)		15:20 (+/- 5 min.)	N/A	No damage reported.
Sources: European Severe Weather Database

=== November 2 ===
List of confirmed tornadoes – Wednesday, November 2, 2022
F#	T#	Location	District/ County	Coord.	Time (UTC)	Path length	Comments/Damage
Ireland
F1	T3	Foulkesmill	County Wexford		12:15 (+/- 5 min.)	N/A	Trees were heavily damaged, some of which were heavily debranched. Homes sustained loss of exterior walls & had their roofs severely damaged.
Italy
FU	N/A	Portovenere	Liguria		14:50 (+/- 5 min.)	N/A	No damage reported.
Sources: European Severe Weather Database

=== November 3 ===
List of confirmed tornadoes – Thursday, November 3, 2022
F#	T#	Location	District/ County	Coord.	Time (UTC)	Path length	Comments/Damage
Italy
FU	N/A	Fiumicino	Lazio		10:35 (+/- 5 min.)	N/A	No damage reported.
Sources: European Severe Weather Database

=== November 4 ===
List of confirmed tornadoes – Friday, November 4, 2022
F#	T#	Location	District/ County	Coord.	Time (UTC)	Path length	Comments/Damage
Italy
F0	N/A	Formia	Lazio		07:00 (+/- 5 min.)	N/A	Waterspout made landfall, downing Street signs & blowing away sheeting.
F1	N/A	Minturno	Lazio		07:15 (+/- 15 min.)	N/A	Buildings sustained heavy roof damage, including two factories that sustained loss of exterior walls & roof. A car was flipped a couple 10 meters off the road & a truck was moved. A repeater tower collapsed. 3 people sustained injuries.
FU	N/A	Castel Volturno	Campania		07:35 (+/- 5 min.)	N/A	No damage reported
France
F1	N/A	Mouchan	Région Midi-Pyrénées		11:10 (+/- 15 min.)	N/A	A barn was tilted & lost some roof tiles. Trees were uprooted & lost large branches. Homes sustained roof loss & a small metal powerline were bent & twisted
Sources: European Severe Weather Database

=== November 8 ===
List of confirmed tornadoes – Tuesday, November 8, 2022
F#	T#	Location	District/ County	Coord.	Time (UTC)	Path length	Comments/Damage
France
F0	N/A	Moëlan-sur-Mer (Finistère)	Bretagne		06:50 (+/- 5 min.)	2.0 km	Pines cut halfway up, large deciduous branches uprooted, a small tree uprooted, lean-to destroyed, palisade and gate torn out, bay windows of a veranda projected inside, slates dislodged.
Sources: European Severe Weather Database

=== November 13 ===
List of confirmed tornadoes – Sunday, November 13, 2022
F#	T#	Location	District/ County	Coord.	Time (UTC)	Path length	Comments/Damage
France
FU	N/A	Bastia (Haute-Corse)	Corse		14:23	Unknown	Tornado from a waterspout, causing no damage.
Sources: European Severe Weather Database

=== November 17 ===
List of confirmed tornadoes – Thursday, November 17, 2022
F#	T#	Location	District/ County	Coord.	Time (UTC)	Path length	Comments/Damage
France
F0	N/A	Vœuil-et-Giget (Charente)	Nouvelle-Aquitaine		10:20 (+/- 5 min.)	2.8 km	A few uprooted trees; a pollarded cedar; slight damage to dwellings; projections of branches at a short distance; garden furniture taken away.
F1	N/A	Suippes (Marne)	Grand-Est		12:20 (+/- 5 min.)	1.6 km	Uprooted or cut trees; small garden shed projected at a short distance; tiles, slates and ridge tiles removed from small portions of roofs; damaged shed or outbuilding roofs; a bent metal post; a collapsed courtyard; sections of roof (with structural elements) of the fire station torn off; garden furniture taken away; projections of sheets, branches, and glass wool at a short distance.
Sources: European Severe Weather Database
Germany
F2	T4	Urexweiler	Saarland		13h45 (+/- 5 min.)	>10.9 km	?
Sources: European Severe Weather Database

=== November 23 ===
List of confirmed tornadoes – Wednesday, November 23, 2022
F#	T#	Location	District/ County	Coord.	Time (UTC)	Path length	Comments/Damage
France
F0	N/A	Bouillé-Ménard (Maine-et-Loire)	Pays-de-la-Loire		23:05 (+/- 5 min.)	0.6 km	Small trees uprooted or branches broken; sectioned conifer; a building serving as a shed, collapsed; sheets of outbuildings torn out and carried away; damaged roofs; small garden buildings partly demolished; roof of an outbuilding torn off in a single block (significant wind resistance).
Sources: European Severe Weather Database

=== November 24 ===
List of confirmed tornadoes – Thursday, November 24, 2022
F#	T#	Location	District/ County	Coord.	Time (UTC)	Path length	Comments/Damage
France
F0	N/A	Plovan (Finistère)	Bretagne		12:00 (+/- 30 min.)	0.7 km	Tornado from a waterspout. Large branches broken, trees uprooted, several roofs of houses affected (slates and ridge tiles washed away on a small portion), a veranda partly blown away, wall in overturned breeze blocks, garden chalet destroyed, garden furniture washed away.
Sources: European Severe Weather Database

== December ==
Confirmed tornadoes by Fujita rating
FU	F0	F1	F2	F3	F4	F5	Total
44	2	2	1	0	0	0	49

=== December 1 ===
List of confirmed tornadoes – Thursday, december 1, 2022
F#	T#	Location	District/ County	Coord.	Time (UTC)	Path length	Comments/Damage
Cyprus
FU	N/A	Akrotiri	Limassol		06:05 (+/- 15 min.)	N/A	No damage reported.
Turkey
FU	N/A	Belek	Antalya Province		11:00 (+/- 30 min.)	N/A	No damage reported.
FU	N/A	Belek	Antalya Province		11:00 (+/- 30 min.)	N/A	No damage reported.
Sources: European Severe Weather Database

=== December 2 ===
List of confirmed tornadoes – friday, december 2, 2022
F#	T#	Location	District/ County	Coord.	Time (UTC)	Path length	Comments/Damage
Greece
FU	N/A	Sámi	Kefallinía		05:45 (+/- 5 min.)	N/A	No damage reported.
Italy
FU	N/A	Serrara Fontana	Campania		10:30 (+/- 30 min.)	N/A	No damage reported.
Sources: European Severe Weather Database

=== December 4 ===
List of confirmed tornadoes – sunday, december 4, 2022
F#	T#	Location	District/ County	Coord.	Time (UTC)	Path length	Comments/Damage
Italy
F2	N/A	Isola di Capo Rizzuto	Calabria		03:00 (+/- 5 min.)	17 km	Waterspout hit land, tracking for 17 kilometres, reaching 300 meters wide. Considerable damage occurred. Three camping sites severely damaged with roulottes moved or destroyed, a steel power truss ripped from the ground and moved for 40 meters while other power poles were downed or snapped. Trees were uprooted or snapped, roofs seriously damaged or partially ripped off. farm buildings were severely damaged, with some weak buildings being completely destroyed. Cars were moved and seriously damaged
FU	N/A	Anzio	Lazio		09:30 (+/- 5 min.)	N/A	No damage reported.
FU	N/A	Rio Marina	Toscana		12:00 (+/- 15 min.)	N/A	No damage reported.
FU	N/A	Livorno	Toscana		21:05 (+/- 5 min.)	N/A	Storm chasers observed a waterspout with landfall. No damage reported.
Sources: European Severe Weather Database

=== December 5 ===
List of confirmed tornadoes – monday, december 5, 2022
F#	T#	Location	District/ County	Coord.	Time (UTC)	Path length	Comments/Damage
Greece
FU	N/A	Agios Georgios	Corfu		07:00 (+/- 15 min.)	N/A	Storm chaser observed a tornado family. No damage reported.
FU	N/A	Agios Georgios	Corfu		08:30 (+/- 15 min.)	N/A	Storm chaser observed a tornado family. No damage reported.
FU	N/A	Agios Georgios	Corfu		08:45 (+/- 5 min.)	N/A	Storm chaser observed a tornado family. No damage reported.
FU	N/A	Agios Georgios	Corfu		09:00 (+/- 15 min.)	N/A	Storm chaser observed a tornado family. No damage reported.
FU	N/A	Agios Georgios	Corfu		09:10 (+/- 5 min.)	N/A	Storm chaser observed a tornado family. No damage reported.
FU	N/A	Agios Georgios	Corfu		10:00 (+/- 15 min.)	N/A	Storm chaser observed a tornado family. No damage reported.
FU	N/A	Agios Georgios	Corfu		10:40 (+/- 5 min.)	N/A	Storm chaser observed a tornado family. No damage reported.
FU	N/A	Agios Georgios	Corfu		11:00 (+/- 15 min.)	N/A	Storm chaser observed a tornado family. No damage reported.
FU	N/A	Agios Georgios	Corfu		11:20 (+/- 5 min.)	N/A	Storm chaser observed a tornado family. No damage reported.
FU	N/A	Agios Georgios	Corfu		12:00 (+/- 15 min.)	N/A	Storm chaser observed a tornado family. No damage reported.
FU	N/A	Agios Georgios	Corfu		12:00 (+/- 5 min.)	N/A	Storm chaser observed a tornado family. No damage reported.
FU	N/A	Agios Georgios	Corfu		13:00 (+/- 5 min.)	N/A	Storm chaser observed a tornado family. No damage reported.
FU	N/A	Agios Georgios	Corfu		14:00 (+/- 5 min.)	N/A	Storm chaser observed a tornado family. No damage reported.
FU	N/A	Agios Georgios	Corfu		14:00 (+/- 5 min.)	N/A	Storm chaser observed a tornado family. No damage reported.
FU	N/A	Agios Georgios	Corfu		14:00 (+/- 5 min.)	N/A	Storm chaser observed a tornado family. No damage reported.
FU	N/A	Agios Georgios	Corfu		14:00 (+/- 5 min.)	N/A	Storm chaser observed a tornado family. No damage reported.
FU	N/A	Agios Georgios	Corfu		14:00 (+/- 5 min.)	N/A	Storm chaser observed a tornado family. No damage reported.
FU	N/A	Agios Georgios	Corfu		14:00 (+/- 5 min.)	N/A	Storm chaser observed a tornado family. No damage reported.
FU	N/A	Agios Georgios	Corfu		14:10 (+/- 5 min.)	N/A	Storm chaser observed a tornado family. No damage reported.
FU	N/A	Agios Georgios	Corfu		14:24 (+/- 1 min.)	N/A	Storm chaser observed a tornado family. No damage reported.
Italy
FU	N/A	Vinci	Toscana		14:25 (+/- 5 min.)	N/A	No damage reported.
Spain
F0	T1	Marbella	Andalucía		15:30 (+/- 15 min.)	5 KM	Trees were uprooted & lost large branches & roofs sustained limited damage
Sources: European Severe Weather Database

=== December 7 ===
List of confirmed tornadoes – Wednesday, december 7, 2022
F#	T#	Location	District/ County	Coord.	Time (UTC)	Path length	Comments/Damage
Croatia
FU	N/A	Dubrovnik	Dubrovačko-Neretvanska		08:00 (+/- 1 Hour.)	N/A	No damage reported.
FU	N/A	Dubrovnik	Dubrovačko-Neretvanska		08:00 (+/- 1 Hour.)	N/A	No damage reported.
FU	N/A	Komiža	Splitsko-Dalmatinska		11:20 (+/- 5 min.)	N/A	No damage reported.
Portugal
F0	T1	Fazendas de Almeirim	Santarém		23:30 (+/- 30 min.)	N/A	Some large branches were downed. Roofs & greenhouses were slightly damaged.
Sources: European Severe Weather Database

=== December 8 ===
List of confirmed tornadoes – Thursday, december 8, 2022
F#	T#	Location	District/ County	Coord.	Time (UTC)	Path length	Comments/Damage
Spain
FU	N/A	Poblado de Sancti Petri	Andalucía		13:15 (+/- 30 min.)	N/A	No damage reported.
Italy
FU	N/A	Cellole	Campania		15:45 (+/- 15 min.)	N/A	No damage reported.
FU	N/A	Cellole	Campania		15:45 (+/- 15 min.)	N/A	No damage reported.
Sources: European Severe Weather Database

=== December 9 ===
List of confirmed tornadoes – friday, december 9, 2022
F#	T#	Location	District/ County	Coord.	Time (UTC)	Path length	Comments/Damage
Spain
F1	N/A	Arcos de la Frontera	Andalucía		09:00 (+/- 15 min.)	N/A	Roofs & trees were damaged & outdoor steel furniture were overturned or tossed.
Sources: European Severe Weather Database

=== December 12 ===
List of confirmed tornadoes – Monday, december 12, 2022
F#	T#	Location	District/ County	Coord.	Time (UTC)	Path length	Comments/Damage
Turkey
F1	T2	Kadriye	Antalya Province		14:00 (+/- 15 min.)	N/A	Some roofs sustained damage & weaker greenhouses were severely damaged by this low-end F1 tornado.
Italy
FU	N/A	Imperia	Liguria		14:00 (+/- 15 min.)	N/A	No damage reported.
Sources: European Severe Weather Database

=== December 14 ===
List of confirmed tornadoes – Wednesday, december 14, 2022
F#	T#	Location	District/ County	Coord.	Time (UTC)	Path length	Comments/Damage
Spain
F1	N/A	Jerez de la Frontera	Andalucía		01:40 (+/- 15 min.)	13 km	This F1 Tornado tracked 13 kilometres, reaching 100 meters wide. Trees were uprooted or snapped, one of which were dragged onto the road. Traffic signs were destroyed & cars were damaged by downed trees & branches.
Sources: European Severe Weather Database

=== December 19 ===
List of confirmed tornadoes – Monday, december 19, 2022
F#	T#	Location	District/ County	Coord.	Time (UTC)	Path length	Comments/Damage
Portugal
FU	N/A	Mosteiros	Azores		10:30 (+/- 30 min.)	N/A	No damage reported.
Sources: European Severe Weather Database

=== December 23 ===
List of confirmed tornadoes – Friday, december 23, 2022
F#	T#	Location	District/ County	Coord.	Time (UTC)	Path length	Comments/Damage
Italy
FU	N/A	Genova	Liguria		09:45 (+/- 15 min.)	N/A	No damage reported.
Sources: European Severe Weather Database

=== December 29 ===
List of confirmed tornadoes – Thursday, december 29, 2022
F#	T#	Location	District/ County	Coord.	Time (UTC)	Path length	Comments/Damage
Greece
FU	N/A	Ródos	Dodekánisos		09:10 (+/- 1 min.)	N/A	Storm spotter observed a waterspout. No damage reported.
FU	N/A	Pérdika	Thesprotia		15:00 (+/- 15 min.)	N/A	No damage reported.
Italy
FU	N/A	Camogli	Liguria		13:00 (+/- 5 min.)	N/A	No damage reported.
Sources: European Severe Weather Database

=== December 30 ===
List of confirmed tornadoes – Friday, december 23, 2022
F#	T#	Location	District/ County	Coord.	Time (UTC)	Path length	Comments/Damage
Greece
FU	N/A	Kos	Dodekánisos		14:45 (+/- 1 min.)	N/A	Storm spotter observed a waterspout. No damage reported.
Sources: European Severe Weather Database

== See also ==
- Tornadoes of 2022
- Weather of 2022
- List of European tornadoes in 2012
- List of tornadoes rated on the International Fujita scale
