= Karıncalı =

Karıncalı may refer to places in Turkey:

== Places ==
- Karıncalı, Kırşehir - a village in Kırşehir district of Kırşehir Province
- Karıncalı, Bayramiç - a village in Bayramiç district of Çanakkale Province
- Karıncalı, Serik - a town in Serik district of Antalya Province
- Karıncalı, Malazgirt - a village in Malazgirt district of Muş Province
- Karıncalı, Orhaneli - a town in Orhaneli district of Bursa Province
