= Etler =

Etler is a surname. Notable people with the surname include:

- Alvin Etler (1913–1973), American composer and oboist
- Irvin A. Etler (1935–2010), American football coach and entrepreneur

== Other ==
- Etler, Serik, a neighbourhood in Serik, Antalya Province, Turkey
