= Dikmen, Serik =

Dikmen
- Neighbourhood
- Location in Turkey
- Coordinates: 36.9097°N 31.0008°E
- Country: Turkey
- Province: Antalya
- District: Serik
- Population (2022): 776
- Time zone: UTC+3 (TRT)

Dikmen is a neighbourhood in the municipality and district of Serik, Antalya Province, Turkey. Its population is 776 (2022).

== History ==
The village was established by the immigrants of post 1877-1878 Russo-Turkish War from Ottoman Thessaly state, Yenisehir town (English: Larissa). Yörük people also settled in the village after they stopped living a nomadic lifestyle.

== Geography ==
Dikmen is located 25 km away from Antalya city center, 13 km from Serik town, 2 km from Kadriye, 3 km from Antalya-Serik land route.

== Population ==
Historical population
| Year | Pop. | ±% p.a. |
|---|---|---|
| 1997 | 551 | — |
| 2007 | 553 | +0.04% |
| 2012 | 542 | −0.40% |
| 2017 | 609 | +2.36% |
| 2022 | 776 | +4.97% |
Source: 1997 census and TÜIK (2007-2022)
