= Kozan, Serik =

Kozan
- Neighbourhood
- Location in Turkey
- Coordinates: 37.2225°N 30.9275°E
- Country: Turkey
- Province: Antalya
- District: Serik
- Population (2022): 331
- Time zone: UTC+3 (TRT)

Kozan is a neighbourhood in the municipality and district of Serik, Antalya Province, Turkey. Its population is 331 (2022).
