= Yeşilyurt, Serik =

Yeşilyurt
- Neighbourhood
- Location in Turkey
- Coordinates: 36.9837°N 31.0609°E
- Country: Turkey
- Province: Antalya
- District: Serik
- Population (2022): 581
- Time zone: UTC+3 (TRT)

Yeşilyurt is a neighbourhood in the municipality and district of Serik, Antalya Province, Turkey. Its population is 581 (2022).
