= Eminceler, Serik =

Eminceler
- Neighbourhood
- Location in Turkey
- Coordinates: 36°54′15″N 31°03′59″E
- Country: Turkey
- Province: Antalya
- District: Serik
- Population (2022): 618
- Time zone: UTC+3 (TRT)

Eminceler is a neighbourhood in the municipality and district of Serik, Antalya Province, Turkey. Its population is 618 (2022).
