= Tekkeköy, Serik =

Tekkeköy
- Neighbourhood
- Location in Turkey
- Coordinates: 37.0146°N 30.9687°E
- Country: Turkey
- Province: Antalya
- District: Serik
- Population (2022): 968
- Time zone: UTC+3 (TRT)

Tekkeköy (also: Tekke) is a neighbourhood in the municipality and district of Serik, Antalya Province, Turkey. Its population is 968 (2022).
