= Akçapınar, Serik =

Akçapınar
- Neighbourhood
- Location in Turkey
- Coordinates: 37.1500°N 30.9072°E
- Country: Turkey
- Province: Antalya
- District: Serik
- Population (2022): 435
- Time zone: UTC+3 (TRT)

Akçapınar is a neighbourhood in the municipality and district of Serik, Antalya Province, Turkey. Its population is 435 (2022).
