= Cumalı, Serik =

Cumalı
- Neighbourhood
- Location in Turkey
- Coordinates: 36.9167°N 31.0667°E
- Country: Turkey
- Province: Antalya
- District: Serik
- Population (2022): 2,135
- Time zone: UTC+3 (TRT)

Cumalı is a neighbourhood in the municipality and district of Serik, Antalya Province, Turkey. Its population is 2,135 (2022).
