= Hacıosmanlar, Serik =

Hacıosmanlar
- Neighbourhood
- Location in Turkey
- Coordinates: 37.1565°N 30.9473°E
- Country: Turkey
- Province: Antalya
- District: Serik
- Population (2022): 267
- Time zone: UTC+3 (TRT)

Hacıosmanlar is a neighbourhood in the municipality and district of Serik, Antalya Province, Turkey. Its population is 267 (2022).
