= Eskiyürük, Serik =

Eskiyürük
- Neighbourhood
- Location in Turkey
- Coordinates: 36.9709°N 30.9718°E
- Country: Turkey
- Province: Antalya
- District: Serik
- Population (2022): 665
- Time zone: UTC+3 (TRT)

Eskiyürük is a neighbourhood in the municipality and district of Serik, Antalya Province, Turkey. Its population is 665 (2022).
