= Karataş, Serik =

Karataş
- Neighbourhood
- Location in Turkey
- Coordinates: 37.0585°N 31.1447°E
- Country: Turkey
- Province: Antalya
- District: Serik
- Population (2022): 248
- Time zone: UTC+3 (TRT)

Karataş is a neighbourhood in the municipality and district of Serik, Antalya Province, Turkey. Its population is 248 (2022).
