= Çanakçı, Serik =

Çanakçı
- Neighbourhood
- Location in Turkey
- Coordinates: 36.9742°N 31.0183°E
- Country: Turkey
- Province: Antalya
- District: Serik
- Population (2022): 374
- Time zone: UTC+3 (TRT)

Çanakçı is a neighbourhood in the municipality and district of Serik, Antalya Province, Turkey. Its population is 374 (2022).
