= Gökçepınar, Serik =

Gökçepınar
- Neighbourhood
- Location in Turkey
- Coordinates: 37.0611°N 31.0696°E
- Country: Turkey
- Province: Antalya
- District: Serik
- Population (2022): 195
- Time zone: UTC+3 (TRT)

Gökçepınar is a neighbourhood in the municipality and district of Serik, Antalya Province, Turkey. Its population is 195 (2022).
