= Bilginler, Serik =

Bilginler
- Neighbourhood
- Location in Turkey
- Coordinates: 37°01′N 31°07′E
- Country: Turkey
- Province: Antalya
- District: Serik
- Population (2022): 515
- Time zone: UTC+3 (TRT)

Bilginler is a neighbourhood in the municipality and district of Serik, Antalya Province, Turkey. Its population is 515 (2022).
