= Kozağacı, Serik =

Kozağacı
- Neighbourhood
- Location in Turkey
- Coordinates: 36.9288°N 30.9385°E
- Country: Turkey
- Province: Antalya
- District: Serik
- Population (2022): 1,072
- Time zone: UTC+3 (TRT)

Kozağacı is a neighbourhood in the municipality and district of Serik, Antalya Province, Turkey. Its population is 1,072 (2022).
