= Aşağıkocayatak, Serik =

Aşağıkocayatak
- Neighbourhood
- Location in Turkey
- Coordinates: 36°55′N 30°57′E
- Country: Turkey
- Province: Antalya
- District: Serik
- Population (2022): 1,530
- Time zone: UTC+3 (TRT)

Aşağıkocayatak is a neighbourhood in the municipality and district of Serik, Antalya Province, Turkey. Its population is 1,530 (2022).
