= Kırbaş, Serik =

Kırbaş
- Neighbourhood
- Location in Turkey
- Coordinates: 37.1949°N 30.8284°E
- Country: Turkey
- Province: Antalya
- District: Serik
- Population (2022): 179
- Time zone: UTC+3 (TRT)

Kırbaş is a neighbourhood in the municipality and district of Serik, Antalya Province, Turkey. Its population is 179 (2022).
