= Aşağıçatma, Serik =

Aşağıçatma
- Neighbourhood
- Location in Turkey
- Coordinates: 36°54′N 31°03′E
- Country: Turkey
- Province: Antalya
- District: Serik
- Population (2022): 240
- Time zone: UTC+3 (TRT)

Aşağıçatma is a neighbourhood in the municipality and district of Serik, Antalya Province, Turkey. Its population is 240 (2022).
