= Burmahancı, Serik =

Burmahancı
- Neighbourhood
- Location in Turkey
- Coordinates: 36°56′55″N 31°04′03″E
- Country: Turkey
- Province: Antalya
- District: Serik
- Population (2022): 1,151
- Time zone: UTC+3 (TRT)

Burmahancı is a neighbourhood in the municipality and district of Serik, Antalya Province, Turkey. Its population is 1,151 (2022).
