= Yumaklar, Serik =

Yumaklar
- Neighbourhood
- Location in Turkey
- Coordinates: 37°09′N 30°59′E
- Country: Turkey
- Province: Antalya
- District: Serik
- Population (2022): 780
- Time zone: UTC+3 (TRT)

Yumaklar is a neighbourhood in the municipality and district of Serik, Antalya Province, Turkey. Its population is 780 (2022).
