= Nebiler, Serik =

Nebiler
- Neighbourhood
- Location in Turkey
- Coordinates: 37.0267°N 30.9394°E
- Country: Turkey
- Province: Antalya
- District: Serik
- Population (2022): 396
- Time zone: UTC+3 (TRT)

Nebiler is a neighbourhood in the municipality and district of Serik, Antalya Province, Turkey. Its population is 396 (2022).
