= Bozdoğan, Serik =

Bozdoğan
- Neighbourhood
- Location in Turkey
- Coordinates: 37.2747°N 30.9342°E
- Country: Turkey
- Province: Antalya
- District: Serik
- Population (2022): 133
- Time zone: UTC+3 (TRT)

Bozdoğan is a neighbourhood in the municipality and district of Serik, Antalya Province, Turkey. Its population is 133 (2022).
