= Yukarıçatma, Serik =

Yukarıçatma
- Neighbourhood
- Location in Turkey
- Coordinates: 37°02′N 30°57′E
- Country: Turkey
- Province: Antalya
- District: Serik
- Population (2024): 285
- Time zone: UTC+3 (TRT)

Yukarıçatma is a neighbourhood in the municipality and district of Serik, Antalya Province, Turkey. Its population is 276 (2022).
