= Yukarıkocayatak, Serik =

Yukarıkocayatak
- Neighbourhood
- Location in Turkey
- Coordinates: 36°57′16″N 30°57′11″E
- Country: Turkey
- Province: Antalya
- District: Serik
- Population (2022): 4,407
- Time zone: UTC+3 (TRT)

Yukarıkocayatak is a neighbourhood in the municipality and district of Serik, Antalya Province, Turkey. Its population is 4,407 (2022). Before the 2013 reorganisation, it was a town (belde).
