= Serik =

- District and municipality
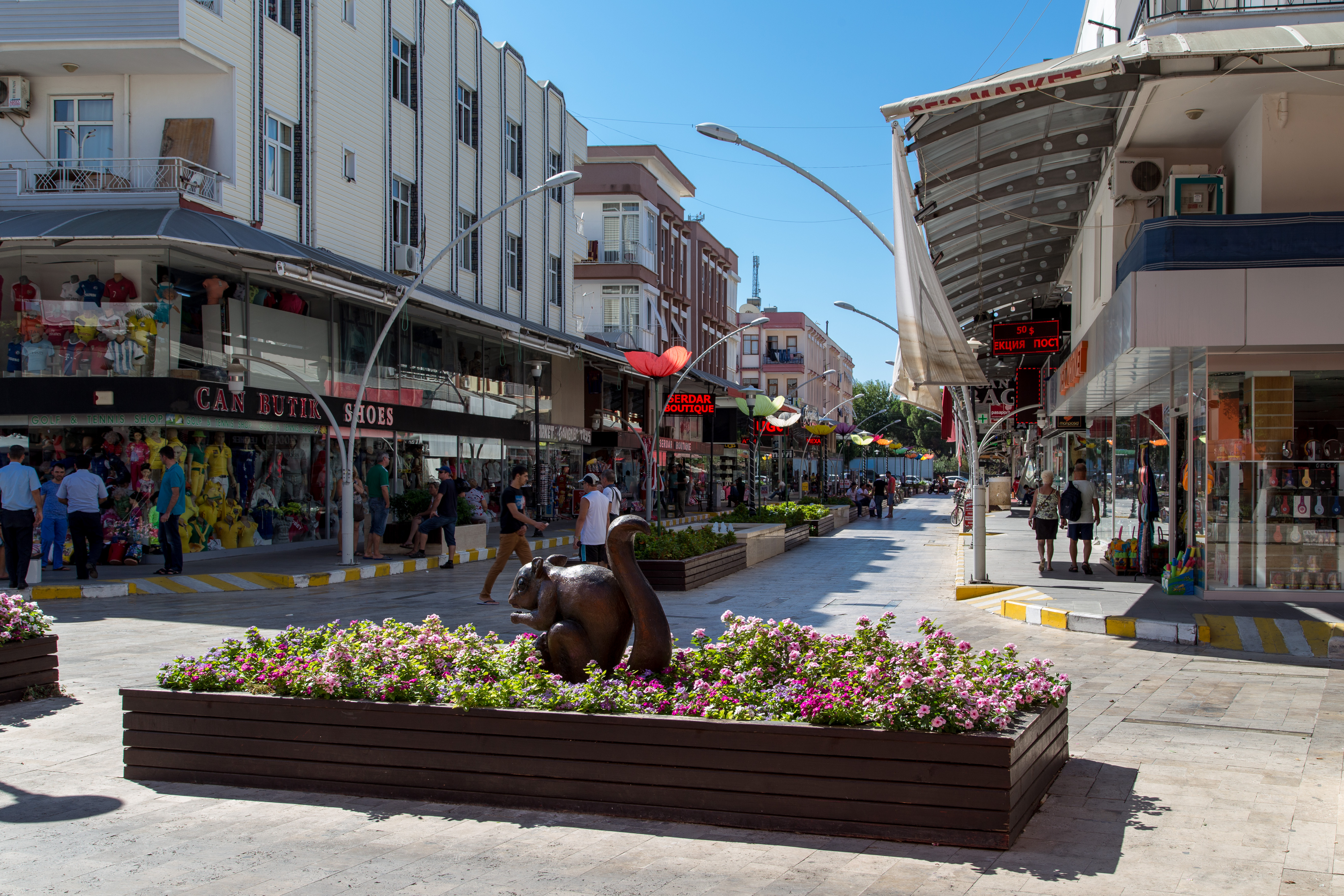
- Belek town in Serik

- Logo

- Map showing Serik District in Antalya Province

- Location within Turkey
- Coordinates: 36°55′N 31°06′E
- Country: Turkey
- Province: Antalya

Government
  - Mayor: Kadir Kumbul (AKP)
- Area: 1,263 km^{2} (488 sq mi)
- Elevation: 26 m (85 ft)
- Population (2025): 147,062
  - Density: 116.4/km^{2} (301.6/sq mi)
- Time zone: UTC+3 (TRT)
- Postal code: 07500
- Area code: 0242
- Website: www.serik.bel.tr

Serik is a municipality and district of Antalya Province, Turkey. Its area is 1,263 km^{2}, and its population is 147,062 (2025). It is 39 km (24 mi) east of the city of Antalya, along the Mediterranean coast.

== History ==
Two important cities here in antiquity were Sillion, a colony of the Kingdom of Pergamon, and Aspendos, one of the most important Greek Pamphylian cities. Aspendos is situated on the point where the Kopru River meets the sea. Once an important port and a commercial centre, it had a reputation for raising the best horses on earth. The odeon, basilica, galleria and fountains are worth seeing.

The area was named Serik after a Turkish tribe that settled here, one of many waves of Turkish settlers attracted to this coast throughout history.

== Geography ==
Towards the coast the district is mainly flat farmland, used for growing vegetables, while the inland half of Serik is forested hills and the Taurus Mountains. The district has a typical Mediterranean climate of hot, dry summers and warm, wet winters, and the natural vegetation is dry shrubs.

Serik itself is a town of 76,046 people (2022). The city of Antalya is nearby limiting the potential for retailing and commerce in Serik, but there is some light industry. There is a well-known köfte and piyaz restaurant in the town centre; the piyaz is served with a sesame (tahini) sauce.

Although wealthy, the people of Serik are typically welcoming and traditional in outlook. The population includes many who still identify themselves as Yörük or Turkmen, descendants of the nomadic people that populated the area during the Ottoman Empire and before. These are close-knit communities shunning outside influence and new immigration, prompting some Turkish people to give it the nickname Capital of a Yörük Republic, an echo of the vivaciously preserved traditions and lifestyle. Although the district has seen a large influx of migrant workers in agriculture and tourism most business in the town is still very much in the hands of these original Turkmen people.

== Population ==
Historical population
Year	Pop.	±% p.a.
2007	105,755	—
2008	101,961	−3.59%
2009	105,856	+3.82%
2010	106,880	+0.97%
2011	109,479	+2.43%
2012	111,764	+2.09%
2013	113,761	+1.79%
2014	117,670	+3.44%
2015	120,111	+2.07%
2016	120,790	+0.57%
2017	122,032	+1.03%
2018	124,335	+1.89%
2019	129,418	+4.09%
2020	130,589	+0.90%
2021	134,953	+3.34%
2022	139,545	+3.40%
2023	141,569	+1.45%
2024	143,435	+1.32%
2025	147,062	+2.53%
Source: TÜİK

=== Tourism ===
With 22 km (14 mi) of coastline including the busy resort town of Belek the district of Serik is a major centre of Turkey's tourism industry, attracting 30 million visitors each year. Belek has over fifty 5 star hotels and golf courses. Places of interest include the ruins of Sillyon and Aspendos, the cave of Zeytinlitaş and Uçansu waterfall.

The 2015 G20 Antalya summit was held in Serik, Antalya.

=== Agriculture ===
Many fruits and vegetables are grown in the region, especially bananas. Blueberries are among the important agricultural products of Serik.

== Composition ==
There are 84 neighbourhoods in Serik District:

- Abdurrahmanlar
- Ahmediye
- Akbaş
- Akçaalan
- Akçapınar
- Akdeniz
- Akınlar
- Alacami
- Aşağıçatma
- Aşağıkocayatak
- Aşağıoba
- Aspendos
- Atatürk
- Azaplar
- Belek
- Belkıs
- Belpınar
- Berendi
- Bilginler
- Boğazak
- Boğazkent
- Bozdoğan
- Bucakköy
- Büğüş
- Burmahancı
- Çakallık
- Çamlık
- Çanakçı
- Çandır
- Çatallar
- Çıtlıklı
- Cumalı
- Cumhuriyet
- Demirciler
- Deniztepesi
- Dikmen
- Dorumlar
- Eminceler
- Eskiyürük
- Etler
- Fatih
- Fedenler
- Gebiz
- Gedik
- Gökçay
- Gökçepınar
- Hacıosmanlar
- Hasdümen
- Haskızılören
- Haspınar
- Kadriye
- Kahyalar
- Karadayı
- Karapınar
- Karataş
- Karıncalı
- Kayaburnu
- Kırbaş
- Kökez
- Kozağacı
- Kozan
- Kürüş
- Kuşlar
- Merkez
- Nebiler
- Orta
- Pınarcık
- Sahil
- Sarıabalı
- Şatırlı
- Sinan
- Tekkeköy
- Tüngüşlü
- Üründü
- Yanköy
- Yeni
- Yeşilvadi
- Yeşilyurt
- Yukarıçatma
- Yukarıkocayatak
- Yumaklar
- Yunuslar
- Zırlankaya
- Zümrüt
