= Büğüş, Serik =

Büğüş
- Neighbourhood
- Location in Turkey
- Coordinates: 37.0388°N 31.0289°E
- Country: Turkey
- Province: Antalya
- District: Serik
- Population (2022): 412
- Time zone: UTC+3 (TRT)

Büğüş is a neighbourhood in the municipality and district of Serik, Antalya Province, Turkey. Its population is 412 (2022).
