= Çatallar, Serik =

Çatallar
- Neighbourhood
- Location in Turkey
- Coordinates: 37.1432°N 30.8581°E
- Country: Turkey
- Province: Antalya
- District: Serik
- Population (2022): 285
- Time zone: UTC+3 (TRT)

Çatallar is a neighbourhood in the municipality and district of Serik, Antalya Province, Turkey. Its population is 285 (2022).
