= Alacami, Serik =

Alacami
- Neighbourhood
- Location in Turkey
- Coordinates: 36.9964°N 31.0445°E
- Country: Turkey
- Province: Antalya
- District: Serik
- Population (2022): 877
- Time zone: UTC+3 (TRT)

Alacami is a neighbourhood in the municipality and district of Serik, Antalya Province, Turkey. Its population is 877 (2022).
