= Üründü, Serik =

Üründü
- Neighbourhood
- Location in Turkey
- Coordinates: 36°58′N 31°06′E
- Country: Turkey
- Province: Antalya
- District: Serik
- Population (2022): 795
- Time zone: UTC+3 (TRT)

Üründü is a neighbourhood in the municipality and district of Serik, Antalya Province, Turkey. Its population is 795 (2022).
