= Bucakköy, Serik =

Bucakköy
- Neighbourhood
- Location in Turkey
- Coordinates: 37°01′41″N 31°12′20″E
- Country: Turkey
- Province: Antalya
- District: Serik
- Population (2022): 231
- Time zone: UTC+3 (TRT)

Bucakköy is a neighbourhood in the municipality and district of Serik, Antalya Province, Turkey. Its population is 231 as of 2022.
