= Hasdümen, Serik =

Hasdümen
- Neighbourhood
- Location in Turkey
- Coordinates: 37°14′N 31°00′E
- Country: Turkey
- Province: Antalya
- District: Serik
- Population (2022): 262
- Time zone: UTC+3 (TRT)

Hasdümen is a neighbourhood in the municipality and district of Serik, Antalya Province, Turkey. Its population is 262 (2022).
