= Dorumlar, Serik =

Dorumlar
- Neighbourhood
- Location in Turkey
- Coordinates: 37.1545°N 30.8688°E
- Country: Turkey
- Province: Antalya
- District: Serik
- Population (2022): 329
- Time zone: UTC+3 (TRT)

Dorumlar is a neighbourhood in the municipality and district of Serik, Antalya Province, Turkey. Its population is 329 (2022).
