= Haspınar, Serik =

Haspınar
- Neighbourhood
- Location in Turkey
- Coordinates: 37°14′N 30°57′E
- Country: Turkey
- Province: Antalya
- District: Serik
- Population (2022): 190
- Time zone: UTC+3 (TRT)

Haspınar (formerly: Hasgebe) is a neighbourhood in the municipality and district of Serik, Antalya Province, Turkey. Its population is 190 (2022).
