= Zırlankaya, Serik =

Zırlankaya
- Neighbourhood
- Location in Turkey
- Coordinates: 37°01′N 31°01′E
- Country: Turkey
- Province: Antalya
- District: Serik
- Population (2022): 400
- Time zone: UTC+3 (TRT)

Zırlankaya is a neighbourhood in the municipality and district of Serik, Antalya Province, Turkey. Its population is 400 (2022).
