= Belkıs, Serik =

Belkıs
- Neighbourhood
- Location in Turkey
- Coordinates: 36.9446°N 31.1668°E
- Country: Turkey
- Province: Antalya
- District: Serik
- Population (2022): 1,564
- Time zone: UTC+3 (TRT)

Belkıs is a neighbourhood in the municipality and district of Serik, Antalya Province, Turkey. Its population is 1,564 (2022). Before the 2013 reorganisation, it was a town (belde).
