= Aşağıoba, Serik =

Aşağıoba
- Neighbourhood
- Location in Turkey
- Coordinates: 37.0697°N 30.9309°E
- Country: Turkey
- Province: Antalya
- District: Serik
- Population (2022): 716
- Time zone: UTC+3 (TRT)

Aşağıoba is a neighbourhood in the municipality and district of Serik, Antalya Province, Turkey. Its population is 716 (2022).
