= Demirciler, Serik =

Demirciler
- Neighbourhood
- Location in Turkey
- Coordinates: 37.2264°N 31.0595°E
- Country: Turkey
- Province: Antalya
- District: Serik
- Population (2022): 171
- Time zone: UTC+3 (TRT)

Demirciler is a neighbourhood in the municipality and district of Serik, Antalya Province, Turkey. Its population is 171 (2022).
