= Sarıabalı, Serik =

Sarıabalı
- Neighbourhood
- Location within Turkey
- Coordinates: 36°58′N 31°11′E
- Country: Turkey
- Province: Antalya
- District: Serik
- Population (2022): 1,062
- Time zone: UTC+3 (TRT)

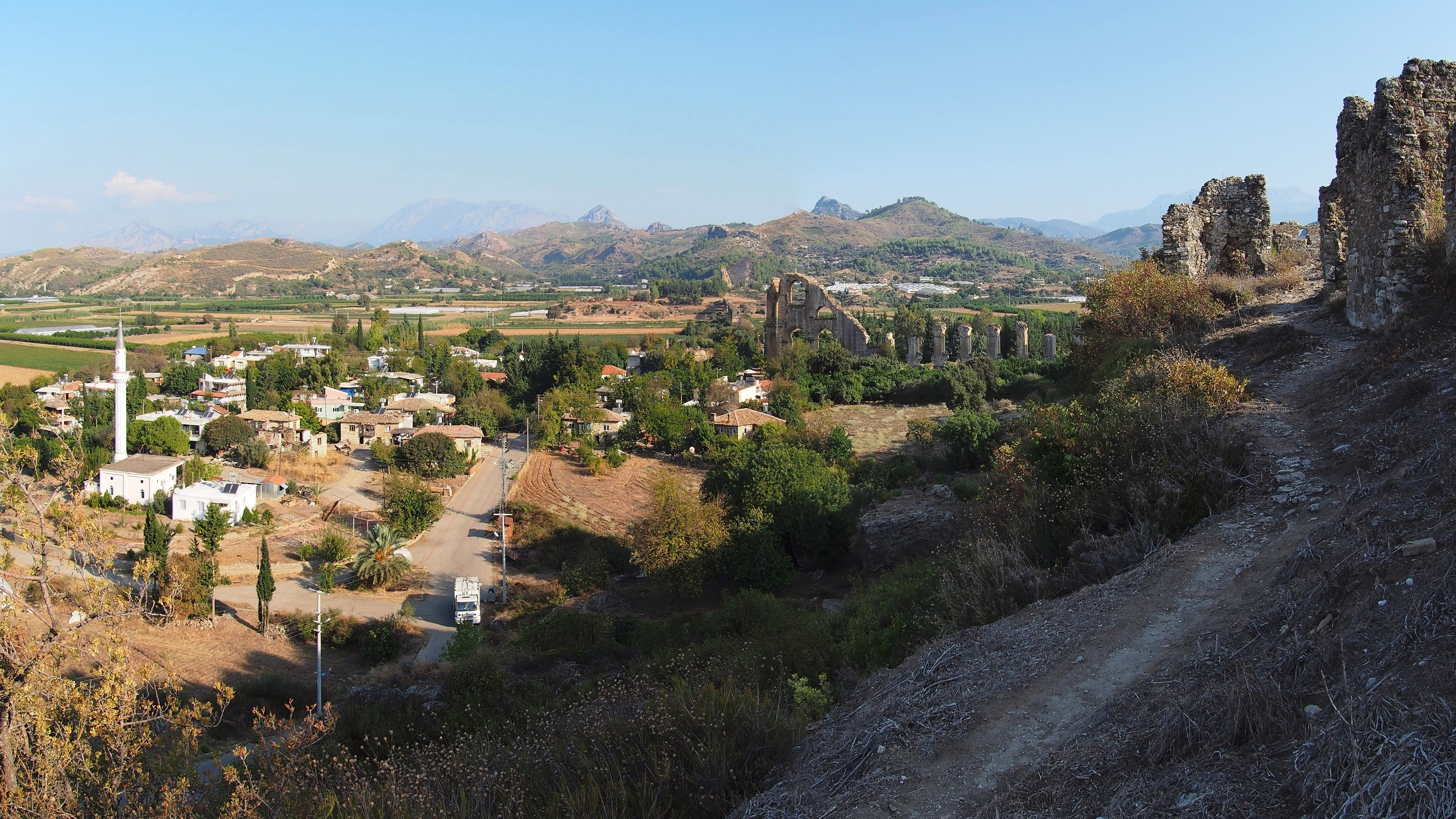
A view of the village and Roman aqueduct remains in Sarıabalı, Serik, Antalya Province, Turkey

Sarıabalı is a neighbourhood in the municipality and district of Serik, Antalya Province, Turkey. Its population is 1,062 (2022).
