= Yanköy, Serik =

Yanköy
- Neighbourhood
- Location in Turkey
- Coordinates: 37°00′N 31°00′E
- Country: Turkey
- Province: Antalya
- District: Serik
- Population (2022): 703
- Time zone: UTC+3 (TRT)

Yanköy is a neighbourhood in the municipality and district of Serik, Antalya Province, Turkey. Its population is 703 (2022).
