= Pınarcık, Serik =

Pınarcık
- Neighbourhood
- Location in Turkey
- Coordinates: 37.0056°N 31.0355°E
- Country: Turkey
- Province: Antalya
- District: Serik
- Population (2022): 744
- Time zone: UTC+3 (TRT)

Pınarcık is a neighbourhood in the municipality and district of Serik, Antalya Province, Turkey. Its population is 744 (2022).
