= Tüngüşlü, Serik =

Tüngüşlü
- Neighbourhood
- Location in Turkey
- Coordinates: 37°04′N 30°58′E
- Country: Turkey
- Province: Antalya
- District: Serik
- Population (2022): 864
- Time zone: UTC+3 (TRT)

Tüngüşlü (also: Töngüşlü) is a neighbourhood in the municipality and district of Serik, Antalya Province, Turkey. Its population is 864 (2022).
