= Kuşlar, Serik =

Kuşlar
- Neighbourhood
- Location in Turkey
- Coordinates: 36.9773°N 31.0497°E
- Country: Turkey
- Province: Antalya
- District: Serik
- Population (2022): 247
- Time zone: UTC+3 (TRT)

Kuşlar is a neighbourhood in the municipality and district of Serik, Antalya Province, Turkey. Its population is 247 (2022).
