= Gedik, Serik =

Gedik
- Neighbourhood
- Location in Turkey
- Coordinates: 36.9155°N 31.0849°E
- Country: Turkey
- Province: Antalya
- District: Serik
- Population (2022): 1,392
- Time zone: UTC+3 (TRT)

Gedik is a neighbourhood in the municipality and district of Serik, Antalya Province, Turkey. Its population is 1,392 (2022).
