= Berendi, Serik =

Berendi
- Neighbourhood
- Location in Turkey
- Coordinates: 36.9940°N 31.0234°E
- Country: Turkey
- Province: Antalya
- District: Serik
- Population (2022): 215
- Time zone: UTC+3 (TRT)

Berendi is a neighbourhood in the municipality and district of Serik, Antalya Province, Turkey. Its population is 215 (2022).
