= Yeşilvadi, Serik =

Yeşilvadi
- Neighbourhood
- Location in Turkey
- Coordinates: 37°12′27″N 31°05′38″E
- Country: Turkey
- Province: Antalya
- District: Serik
- Population (2022): 158
- Time zone: UTC+3 (TRT)

Yeşilvadi is a neighbourhood in the municipality and district of Serik, Antalya Province, Turkey. Its population is 158 (2022).
