= Şatırlı, Serik =

Şatırlı
- Neighbourhood
- Location in Turkey
- Coordinates: 36°59′N 30°57′E
- Country: Turkey
- Province: Antalya
- District: Serik
- Population (2022): 1,313
- Time zone: UTC+3 (TRT)

Şatırlı is a neighbourhood in the municipality and district of Serik, Antalya Province, Turkey. Its population is 1,313 (2022).
