= Boğazkent, Serik =

Boğazkent
- Neighbourhood
- Location in Turkey
- Coordinates: 36°51′15″N 31°09′45″E
- Country: Turkey
- Province: Antalya
- District: Serik
- Population (2022): 3,434
- Time zone: UTC+3 (TRT)

Boğazkent is a neighbourhood in the municipality and district of Serik, Antalya Province, Turkey. Its population is 3,434 (2022). Before the 2013 reorganisation, it was a town (belde).
