= Etler, Serik =

Etler
- Neighbourhood
- Location in Turkey
- Coordinates: 37°09′N 31°04′E
- Country: Turkey
- Province: Antalya
- District: Serik
- Population (2022): 659
- Time zone: UTC+3 (TRT)

Etler is a neighbourhood in the municipality and district of Serik, Antalya Province, Turkey. Its population is 659 (2022).
