= Lajo =

- Commune
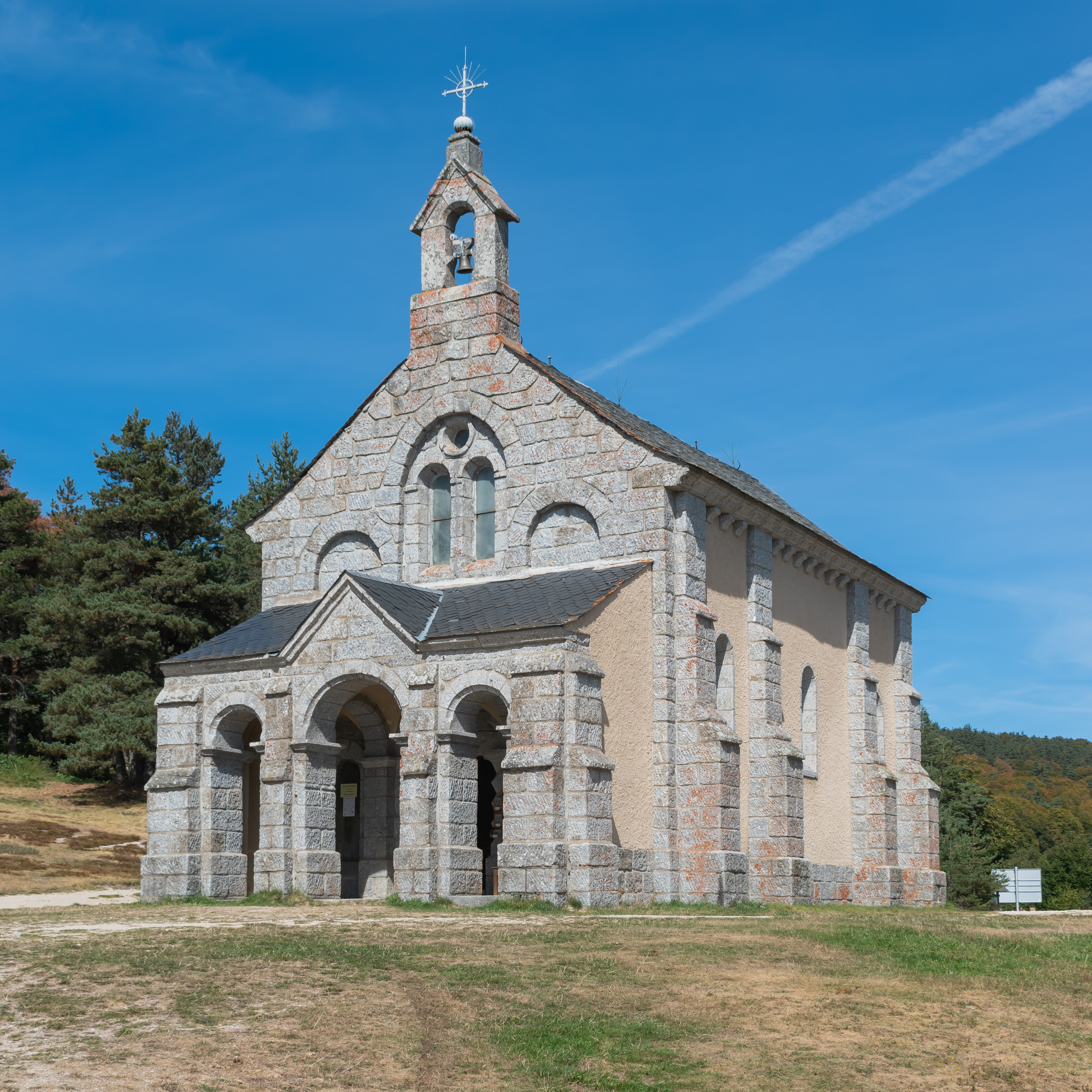
- Saint Roch chapel in Lajo
- Location of Lajo
- Location within France Location within Occitanie
- Coordinates: 44°50′18″N 3°25′38″E
- Country: France
- Region: Occitania
- Department: Lozère
- Arrondissement: Mende
- Canton: Saint-Alban-sur-Limagnole
- Intercommunality: Terres d'Apcher-Margeride-Aubrac

Government
  - Mayor (2020–2026): Alain Soulier
- Area^{1}: 18.58 km^{2} (7.17 sq mi)
- Elevation: 1,220 m (4,000 ft)
- Highest elevation: 1,436 m (4,711 ft)
- Lowest elevation: 1,064 m (3,491 ft)
- Population (2023): 114
  - Density: 6.14/km^{2} (15.9/sq mi)
- Time zone: UTC+01:00 (CET)
  - Summer (DST): UTC+02:00 (CEST)
- INSEE/Postal code: 48079 /48120
- ^{1} French Land Register data, which excludes lakes, ponds, glaciers > 1 km^{2} (0.386 sq mi or 247 acres) and river estuaries.

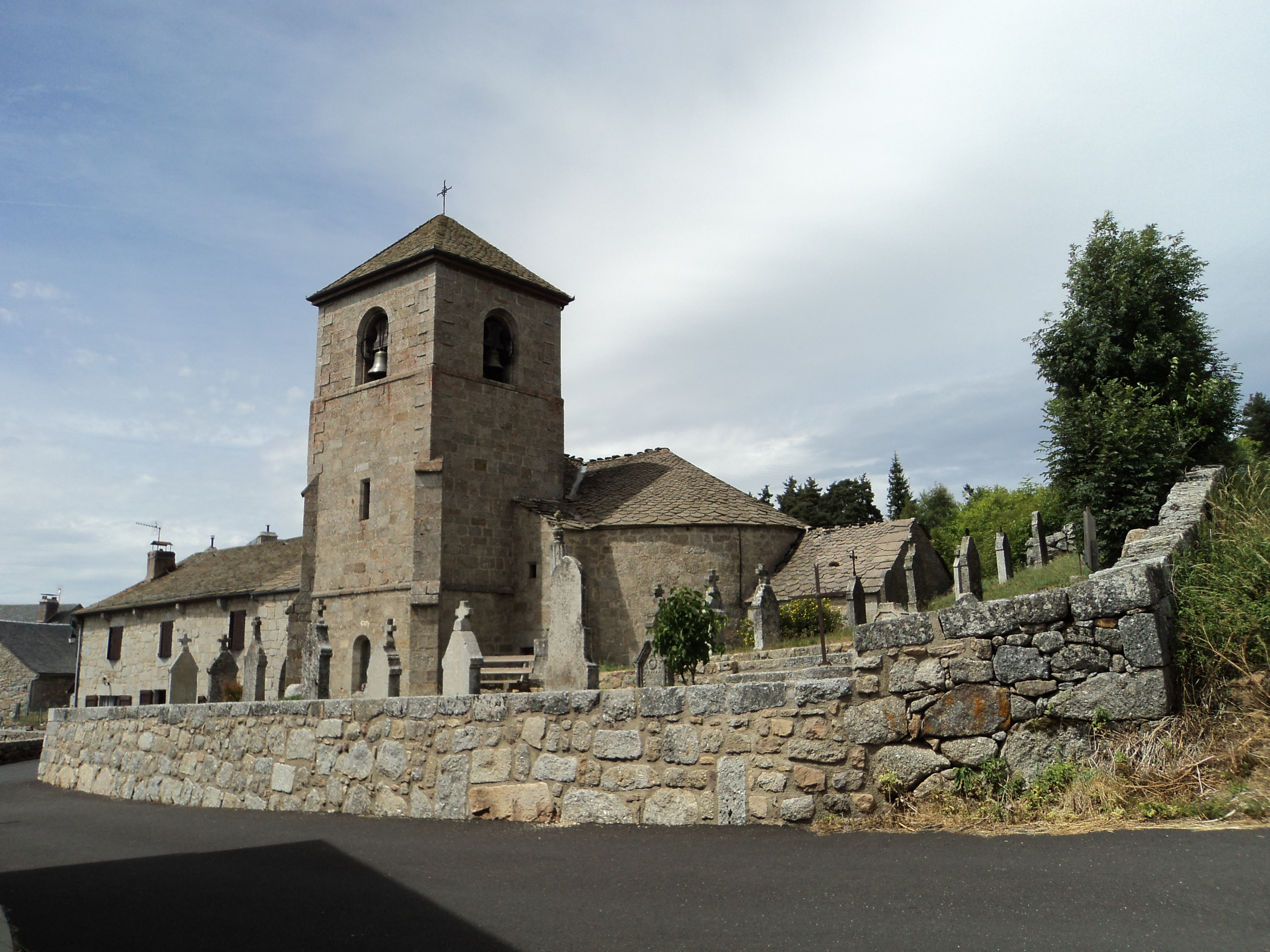
Église Saint-Roch-de-Lajo

Lajo (French pronunciation: [laʒo]; Occitan: L'Atgièr) is a commune in the Lozère department in southern France.

== See also ==
- Communes of the Lozère department
