= Karıncalı, Serik =

Karıncalı
- Neighbourhood
- Location in Turkey
- Coordinates: 36.9548°N 31.0231°E
- Country: Turkey
- Province: Antalya
- District: Serik
- Population (2022): 301
- Time zone: UTC+3 (TRT)

Karıncalı is a neighbourhood in the municipality and district of Serik, Antalya Province, Turkey. Its population is 301 (2022).
