= Çakallık, Serik =

Çakallık
- Neighbourhood
- Location in Turkey
- Coordinates: 36°53′49″N 30°58′35″E
- Country: Turkey
- Province: Antalya
- District: Serik
- Population (2022): 1,774
- Time zone: UTC+3 (TRT)

Çakallık is a neighbourhood in the municipality and district of Serik, Antalya Province, Turkey. Its population is 1,774 (2022).
