= Kadriye =

- Neighbourhood
- Location in Turkey
- Coordinates: 36°53′0″N 31°0′30″E
- Country: Turkey
- Province: Antalya
- District: Serik
- Population (2022): 9,658
- Time zone: UTC+3 (TRT)
- Postal code: 07500
- Area code: 0242
- Website: kadriye.info

Kadriye is a neighbourhood and resort in the municipality and district of Serik, Antalya Province, Turkey. Its population is 9,658 (2022). Before the 2013 reorganisation, it was a town (belde).

Kadriye is Turkey's first Golf Resort and also the first resort with a beach park (Kadriye Beach Park), a theme park (The Land of Legends Kingdom) and luxury golf hotels.

== History ==
It was a municipality between 1994 and 2013.

== Geography ==
Kadriye; distance to Belek 8 km, distance to Serik 15 km, distance to Antalya Airport 20 km and distance to Antalya is 30 km. There are several golf courses and hotels in the town.

== Golf Courses & Golf Clubs ==
- National Golf Club Antalya
- Antalya Golf Club
- Carya Golf Club
- Sueno Golf Club
- Cullinan Links Golf Club
- Kaya Palazzo Golf Club

== Hotels ==
- The Land Of Legends Kingdom Hotel
- The Land Of Legends Nickelodeon Hotels & Resorts
- Kempinski Hotel The Dome
- Club Arona
- Cullinan Hotel
- Calista Luxury Resort
- Selectum Luxury Resort Belek Hotel
- Regnum Carya Golf & Spa Resort
- Regnum The Crown Resort
- Titanic Deluxe
- Sueno Hotels Deluxe Belek
- Sueno Hotels Golf Belek
- Kaya Palazzo Golf Resort
- Kaya Belek Hotel
- IC Hotels Santai Family Resort
- TUI MAGIC LIFE CLUB Masmavi Hotel
- TUI MAGIC LIFE Belek Hotel
- Crystal Tat Beach Golf Resort & Spa
- Club Mega Saray
- Sirene Hotel
- Bellis Deluxe
- Papillon Belvil
- Adora Resort
- Green Max
- Altis Resort
- Aydinbey Queen's Palace & Spa
- The X Hotel
- Innvista Hotels Belek
- Amon Hotels
- IQ Belek Hotel
- FUN&SUN Hotel River Resort
