= 2009 Krasnozavodsk tornado =

Weather event in Russia

Meteorological history
- Formed: June 3, 2009 10:00 pm MSK

F3 tornado
- on the Fujita scale

T6 tornado
- on the TORRO scale
- Highest winds: >260 km/h (160 mph)

Overall effects
- Fatalities: 0-9
- Injuries: 65
- Damage: 520 million Russian rubles ($16.7 million USD)

During the late evening hours of June 3, 2009, a destructive F3 tornado tore through Krasnozavodsk, located in Moscow Oblast, Russia. It was the first intense tornado in the region since 1984. The tornados precise fatality count is unknown however, 65 people were injured according to news outlets.

== Meteorological synopsis ==
On June 3, 2009, a cold-core non-tropical low pressure area was located over the Baltic Sea collided with a warm air mass, leading to atmospheric instability. Resulting in severe thunderstorms across Moscow Oblast. One of the thunderstorms broke off and developed into a supercell thunderstorm about 30 km (19 mi) from Moscow City. The supercell produced a 240 m (790 ft) wide tornado in Krasnozavodsk. Several additional tornadoes also touched down including an F2 tornado near Kupanskoe. Severe thunderstorms from the event were also accompanied by flash flooding, hail and severe wind gusts.

== Tornado summary ==
The tornado touched down in a forested area at 10:00 p.m. MSK and rapidly intensified, snapping or uprooting trees. Moving in a northwestern direction, the tornado brushed a multi-story home and directly struck a small market, completely destroying a single, wooden kiosk. Vehicles were thrown over 100 m (110 yd) away, including a Gazelle truck, which landed on a SUV car. The tornado then struck a row of multi-story apartments on Novaya Street. Roofs and balconies were torn away and interior walls collapsed. Birch trees between homes were snapped or uprooted. A playground had its anchored slide ripped from the ground and a car was thrown soon after. After a sharp northeastern turn, the tornados condensation funnel disappeared however, tornadic circulation remained on the ground. Several houses in the downtown area were damaged before it fully lifted. Around nine people were killed according to locals however, no fatalities were officially reported although, 65 people were injured and 25 required hospitalization. High winds produced by the parent thunderstorm cut power to 40,000 people throughout 250 towns in the area. Electrical failures caused by the tornado sparked fires that destroyed ten flats. Damage from the fires amounted to 170 million RUB (US$5.3 million). Forty-two homes were damaged by the tornado, ranging from roof damage to severe interior damage, 60 vehicles were either thrown or damaged, and 360 trees were snapped or uprooted. Monetary losses from the tornado amounted to around 350 million RUB (US$11.3 million).

== Aftermath ==
Following the severe weather event, emergency response teams were deployed to the affected regions. Cleanup crews rapidly cleared trees and power lines from roads. By June 11, all roads were cleared. Three days later, all of the buildings affected were repaired.

== See also ==
- Tornadoes of 2009
- 1904 Moscow tornado
- 1984 Yaroslavl tornado
- Climate of Moscow
