= Climate of Moscow =

Climate of the capital of Russia

Moscow

Climate chart (precipitation, max. and min. temperature)
J	F	M	A	M	J	J	A	S	O	N	D
53 −4 −9	44 −3 −9	39 3 −4	37 12 2	61 19 8	78 22 12	84 25 15	78 23 13	66 16 8	70 9 3	52 2 −2	51 −2 −7
- █ Average max. and min. temperatures in °C
- █ Precipitation totals in mm
Imperial conversion
J	F	M	A	M	J	J	A	S	O	N	D
2.1 25 16	1.7 27 16	1.5 37 25	1.5 54 36	2.4 66 46	3.1 72 54	3.3 77 59	3.1 73 55	2.6 61 46	2.8 48 37	2 36 28	2 28 19
- █ Average max. and min. temperatures in °F
- █ Precipitation totals in inches

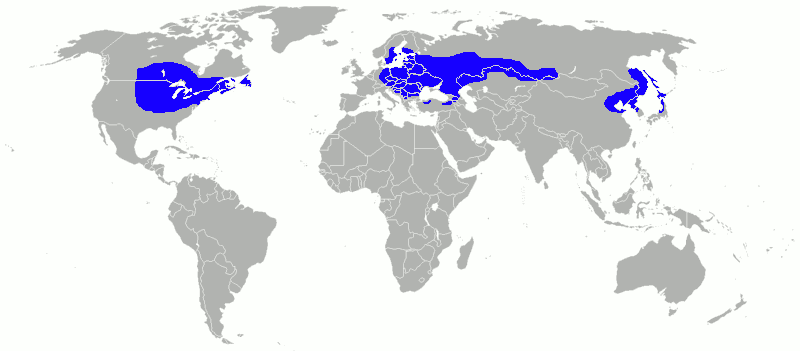
Humid continental climate worldwide

Moscow has a warm-summer humid continental climate (Köppen climate classification Dfb, Trewartha Dcbo) with warm to hot summers and long, cold, winters. Typical high temperatures in the warm months of June, July and August are around 20 °C (68 °F), but during heat waves, which can occur anytime from May to September, daytime temperature highs often top 23 °C (73 °F) sometimes for one or two weeks. In the winter, temperatures normally drop to approximately −20 °C (−4 °F), though there can be periods of warmth with temperatures rising above −5 °C (23 °F). Summer lasts from mid-May to the beginning of September, and winter lasts from the beginning of November to the end of March. Humidity is high year-round, although it is lowest during the spring months.

More extreme continental climates at the same latitude- such as parts of Eastern Canada or Siberia- have much colder winters than Moscow, suggesting that there is still significant moderation from the Atlantic Ocean despite the fact that Moscow is far from the sea.

== Monthly averages and records for Moscow ==
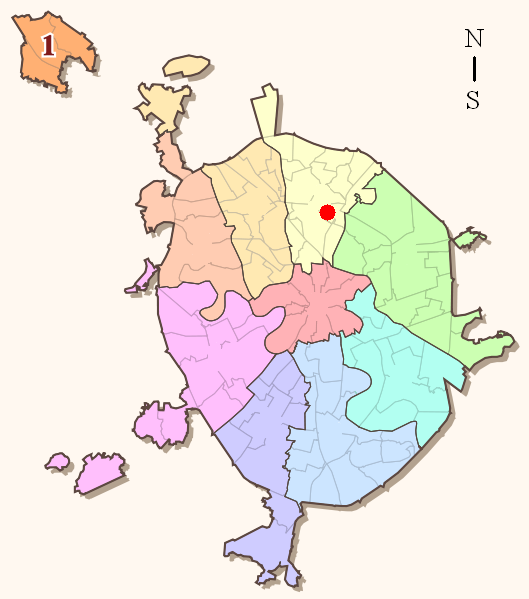
Location of the VVC weather station on the map of Moscow

The highest temperature ever recorded was 38.2 °C (100.8 °F) on July 29, 2010. The lowest temperature ever recorded was −42 °C (−44 °F). In 2007 three record highs for the month occurred – January +8.6 °C (47.5 °F), March +17.5 °C (63.5 °F), and May 33.2 °C (91.8 °F); in 2008, there were new record highs for December and the entire winter: +9.6 °C (49.3 °F). On July 23, 2010, the temperature reached 36.7 °C (98.1 °F) and continued to set record highs each following day until it finally reached 38.2 °C (100.8 °F) on July 29, 2010. In November 2010 a new month record high of +14.5 °C (58.1 °F) occurred (after +12.6 in 1927).

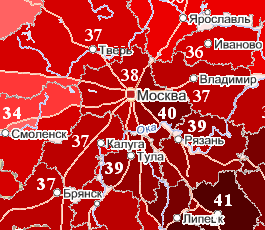
Maximum temperature in Moscow and near regions during the 2010 Northern Hemisphere summer heat wave

Average annual temperature in Moscow (1991-2020 normals) is 6.3 °C (43.3 °F), but recently (2007, 2008, 2015, 2019, 2020, 2022 - 2025) it has been higher than 7 °C (45 °F). In the first half of the 20th century, there was light night frost in late summer. 2025 become the warmest in the history of meteorological observations, the average annual temperature was 8.4 °C (47.1 °F) (while the monthly averages temperatures were above 0 °C (32 °F) even in March and November).. This is higher than the average annual temperature for the period 1991-2020 in several northern US states, such as Minnesota.

Monthly precipitation totals are moderately high throughout the year, although precipitation levels tend to be higher during the summer than during the winter. Due to the significant variation in temperature between the winter and summer months as well as the limited fluctuation in precipitation levels during the summer, Moscow is considered to have a continental climate with no true dry season.

Most of the records and averages are given for VVC weather station, located in the North-Eastern administrative okrug of Moscow. The temperature from this station averages 0.5–1 °C lower than in the city center, and 0.5–2 °C higher than night minimums in the suburbs.

Climate data for Moscow (2009–2018, VVC)
Month	Jan	Feb	Mar	Apr	May	Jun	Jul	Aug	Sep	Oct	Nov	Dec	Year
Mean daily maximum °C (°F)	−6 (21)	−3.6 (25.5)	2.4 (36.3)	11.4 (52.5)	20.1 (68.2)	22.6 (72.7)	25.8 (78.4)	23.9 (75.0)	16.7 (62.1)	7.9 (46.2)	2.1 (35.8)	−2.4 (27.7)	10.2 (50.4)
Daily mean °C (°F)	−7.9 (17.8)	−6 (21)	−1 (30)	6.9 (44.4)	14.7 (58.5)	17.6 (63.7)	20.7 (69.3)	18.9 (66.0)	12.9 (55.2)	5.5 (41.9)	0.7 (33.3)	−3.9 (25.0)	6.6 (43.9)
Mean daily minimum °C (°F)	−9.7 (14.5)	−8.3 (17.1)	−4.5 (23.9)	2.3 (36.1)	9.4 (48.9)	12.5 (54.5)	15.6 (60.1)	13.8 (56.8)	9.1 (48.4)	3.1 (37.6)	−0.7 (30.7)	−5.4 (22.3)	3.1 (37.6)
Mean monthly sunshine hours	37	65	142	213	274	299	323	242	171	88	33	14	1,901
Source: weatheronline.co.uk

Year of	Jan	Feb	Mar	Apr	May	Jun	Jul	Aug	Sep	Oct	Nov	Dec	Year	Year of	Jan	Feb	Mar	Apr	May	Jun	Jul	Aug	Sep	Oct	Nov	Dec	Year
Record high (max t°C)	2007	1989	2014	2012	2007	2021	2010	2010	1890	1915	2013	2008	2010	high avg t°C	2020	1990	2007	2000	1979	1999	2010	2022	2024	2020	2013	2006	2025
Record low (min t°C)	1940	1929	1913	1879	1885	1916	1886	1885	1881	1960	1890	1940	1940	low avg t°C	1893	1929	1860	1929	1918	1904	1904	1884	1993	1976	1844	1788	1862

Climate data for Moscow (VDNKh) WMO ID: 27612; coordinates 55°49′53″N 37°37′20″E; elevation: 147 m (482 ft); 1991–2020 normals, extremes 1879–present
Month	Jan	Feb	Mar	Apr	May	Jun	Jul	Aug	Sep	Oct	Nov	Dec	Year
Record high °C (°F)	8.6 (47.5)	8.3 (46.9)	19.7 (67.5)	28.9 (84.0)	33.2 (91.8)	34.8 (94.6)	38.2 (100.8)	37.3 (99.1)	32.3 (90.1)	24.0 (75.2)	16.2 (61.2)	9.6 (49.3)	38.2 (100.8)
Mean maximum °C (°F)	2.8 (37.0)	3.5 (38.3)	10.8 (51.4)	21.7 (71.1)	27.3 (81.1)	29.5 (85.1)	31.0 (87.8)	30.0 (86.0)	24.7 (76.5)	17.9 (64.2)	8.9 (48.0)	4.2 (39.6)	31.9 (89.4)
Mean daily maximum °C (°F)	−3.9 (25.0)	−3 (27)	3.0 (37.4)	11.7 (53.1)	19.0 (66.2)	22.4 (72.3)	24.7 (76.5)	22.7 (72.9)	16.4 (61.5)	8.9 (48.0)	1.6 (34.9)	−2.3 (27.9)	10.1 (50.2)
Daily mean °C (°F)	−6.2 (20.8)	−5.9 (21.4)	−0.7 (30.7)	6.9 (44.4)	13.6 (56.5)	17.3 (63.1)	19.7 (67.5)	17.6 (63.7)	11.9 (53.4)	5.8 (42.4)	−0.5 (31.1)	−4.4 (24.1)	6.3 (43.3)
Mean daily minimum °C (°F)	−8.7 (16.3)	−8.8 (16.2)	−4.2 (24.4)	2.3 (36.1)	8.1 (46.6)	12.2 (54.0)	14.8 (58.6)	13.0 (55.4)	8.0 (46.4)	3.0 (37.4)	−2.4 (27.7)	−6.5 (20.3)	2.6 (36.7)
Mean minimum °C (°F)	−21.1 (−6.0)	−20.9 (−5.6)	−12.8 (9.0)	−5.1 (22.8)	0.3 (32.5)	5.8 (42.4)	9.7 (49.5)	6.8 (44.2)	0.9 (33.6)	−4.6 (23.7)	−11.7 (10.9)	−17.3 (0.9)	−23.9 (−11.0)
Record low °C (°F)	−42.1 (−43.8)	−38.2 (−36.8)	−32.4 (−26.3)	−21 (−6)	−7.5 (18.5)	−2.3 (27.9)	1.3 (34.3)	−1.2 (29.8)	−8.5 (16.7)	−20.3 (−4.5)	−32.8 (−27.0)	−38.8 (−37.8)	−42.1 (−43.8)
Average precipitation mm (inches)	53 (2.1)	44 (1.7)	39 (1.5)	37 (1.5)	61 (2.4)	78 (3.1)	84 (3.3)	78 (3.1)	66 (2.6)	70 (2.8)	52 (2.0)	51 (2.0)	713 (28.1)
Average extreme snow depth cm (inches)	24 (9.4)	35 (14)	29 (11)	2 (0.8)	0 (0)	0 (0)	0 (0)	0 (0)	0 (0)	0 (0)	4 (1.6)	12 (4.7)	35 (14)
Average rainy days	8	6	9	15	16	16	15	16	16	17	13	8	155
Average snowy days	25	23	15	6	1	0	0	0	0.3	5	17	24	116
Average relative humidity (%)	85	81	74	68	67	72	74	78	82	83	86	86	78
Mean monthly sunshine hours	33	72	128	170	265	279	271	238	147	78	32	18	1,731
Mean daily sunshine hours	1.1	2.5	4.1	5.7	8.5	9.3	8.7	7.7	4.9	2.5	1.1	0.6	4.7
Mean daily daylight hours	7.9	9.7	11.9	14.3	16.3	17.4	16.8	14.9	12.7	10.5	8.4	7.2	12.3
Percentage possible sunshine	14	27	35	40	53	53	52	51	38	24	13	8	34
Average ultraviolet index	0	1	2	3	5	6	6	5	3	1	1	0	3
Source 1: Pogoda.ru.net, Thermograph.ru, Meteoweb.ru (sunshine hours)
Source 2: Weather Atlas (UV)

Climate data for Moscow (VVC) normals 1961–1990, records 1879–the present
Month	Jan	Feb	Mar	Apr	May	Jun	Jul	Aug	Sep	Oct	Nov	Dec	Year
Record high °C (°F)	8.6 (47.5)	8.3 (46.9)	19.7 (67.5)	28.6 (83.5)	33.2 (91.8)	36.0 (96.8)	38.2 (100.8)	37.3 (99.1)	32.3 (90.1)	24.0 (75.2)	14.5 (58.1)	9.6 (49.3)	38.2 (100.8)
Mean daily maximum °C (°F)	−6.3 (20.7)	−4.2 (24.4)	1.5 (34.7)	10.4 (50.7)	18.4 (65.1)	21.7 (71.1)	23.1 (73.6)	21.5 (70.7)	15.4 (59.7)	8.2 (46.8)	1.1 (34.0)	−3.5 (25.7)	8.9 (48.0)
Daily mean °C (°F)	−9.3 (15.3)	−7.7 (18.1)	−2.2 (28.0)	5.8 (42.4)	13.1 (55.6)	16.6 (61.9)	18.2 (64.8)	16.4 (61.5)	11.1 (52.0)	5.1 (41.2)	−1.2 (29.8)	−6.1 (21.0)	5.0 (41.0)
Mean daily minimum °C (°F)	−12.3 (9.9)	−11.1 (12.0)	−5.6 (21.9)	1.7 (35.1)	7.6 (45.7)	11.5 (52.7)	13.5 (56.3)	12.0 (53.6)	7.1 (44.8)	2.1 (35.8)	−3.3 (26.1)	−8.6 (16.5)	1.2 (34.2)
Record low °C (°F)	−42.2 (−44.0)	−38.2 (−36.8)	−32.4 (−26.3)	−21 (−6)	−7.5 (18.5)	−2.3 (27.9)	1.3 (34.3)	−1.2 (29.8)	−8.5 (16.7)	−16.1 (3.0)	−32.8 (−27.0)	−38.8 (−37.8)	−42.2 (−44.0)
Average precipitation mm (inches)	52 (2.0)	41 (1.6)	35 (1.4)	37 (1.5)	51 (2.0)	80 (3.1)	85 (3.3)	82 (3.2)	68 (2.7)	71 (2.8)	54 (2.1)	51 (2.0)	713 (28.1)
Average rainy days	0.8	0.7	3	9	13	14	15	15	15	12	6	2	105.5
Average snowy days	18	15	9	1	0.1	0	0	0	0.1	2	10	17	72.2
Average relative humidity (%)	83	80	74	67	64	70	74	77	81	81	84	85	77
Mean monthly sunshine hours	33	72	128	170	265	279	271	238	147	78	32	18	1,731
Mean daily daylight hours	7.9	9.7	11.9	14.3	16.3	17.4	16.8	14.9	12.7	10.5	8.4	7.2	12.3

Climate data for Moscow, records since 1948 (VVC weather st. only)
Month	Jan	Feb	Mar	Apr	May	Jun	Jul	Aug	Sep	Oct	Nov	Dec	Year
Record high °C (°F)	8.6 (47.5)	8.3 (46.9)	19.7 (67.5)	28.9 (84.0)	33.2 (91.8)	36.0 (96.8)	38.2 (100.8)	37.3 (99.1)	29.4 (84.9)	23.7 (74.7)	14.5 (58.1)	9.6 (49.3)	38.2 (100.8)
Record low °C (°F)	−38.1 (−36.6)	−35.2 (−31.4)	−27.9 (−18.2)	−18.8 (−1.8)	−5.0 (23.0)	0.8 (33.4)	5.1 (41.2)	2.1 (35.8)	−5.2 (22.6)	−16.1 (3.0)	−23.3 (−9.9)	−38.0 (−36.4)	−38.1 (−36.6)

== General characteristics ==
According to observations from 1991-2020, January is the coldest month of the year in Moscow (the average temperature is -6.2 °C), and February is almost as cold (-5.9 °C). The warmest month is July (average temperature +19.7 °C. The coldest month in terms of average monthly temperature in the entire history of observations was January 1893 (-21.6 °C), the warmest was July 2010 (+26.0 °C).

600–700 mm of precipitation falls in Moscow and the surrounding area per year (the record was 892 mm in 1952), with the most precipitation occurring in the summer months, and the least in February, March and April. The driest year for the entire measurement period was 1920, when 338 mm of precipitation fell, and 1964 and 1972 (397 mm each) at VDNKh. Precipitation is decreasing in the city from the northwest to the southeast.

Fogs are not uncommon in Moscow. They can be observed throughout the year. It is possible that the accumulation of moisture in the atmosphere is facilitated by the active influence of industrial enterprises and transport.

- The average annual temperature for 1991-2021 is 6.3 °C
- The average annual temperature over the last 20 years is 7.2 °C (over the last decade +8 °C, in the record warm year of 2025, it reached 8.6 °C. or +9.5°C (2025) at the Baltschug weather station).
- wind speed — 2.3 m/с
- The average annual air humidity is 76%
- The average annual number of hours of sunshine is 1,731 hours. In 2007 and 2014 — more than 2000 hours. At the same time, there is a tendency to decrease the duration of sunshine in late autumn and winter and to increase in spring and summer. July 2014 was the sunniest July measured since 1955 with a sunshine duration of 411 hours, and the whole of 2014 was the record sunniest in the 21st century with a sunshine duration of 2,168 hours.

Moscow's air regime has its own peculiarities: air flows seem to flow into the central part of the city, bringing with them precipitation or heat. This is largely due to the terrain features and the temperature difference in the center of the capital and the periphery. Thus, in the northern, southern and central districts of Moscow, there are areas with fairly dense residential buildings, which are characterized by low wind speeds (1–2 m/s) and frequent occurrence of calm in spring and summer.

As a rule, the temperature in the central areas of the capital is higher than on the outskirts and outside the city, which is especially noticeable at night during the frosts in winter and frosts in spring and autumn, when the temperature difference can reach 5-7 °C, but in cloudy and rainy weather it is often absent or insignificant, no more than 1-3 °C. This is confirmed by the fact that the readings of the weather station at the All-Russian Exhibition Center, located in the north of the city (the data from this weather station is official and is used in the media to determine the actual weather and temperature records in Moscow), are usually 1-2 °C lower than the values of the weather station on Baltschuga, located in the city center. The absolute minimum temperature on it is -38.1 °C, and the absolute maximum is +38.2 °C.

The year 2010 in Moscow took the first place in terms of the number of daily maximum temperature records (28), however, due to the cold January, the year did not become the warmest in history. At the same time, new records of the minimum daily temperature in the city have not been recorded for more than 25 years.

== Moscow weather stations ==
- Moscow Weather Station (VDNH) (operating since 1948), located in the north of the city (now the main weather station in Moscow).
- Moscow weather station, the observatory of Moscow State University (operating since 1954), in the southwest of the city.
- Moscow weather station, Observatory named after Mikhelson's Observatory (Timiryazevskaya Agricultural Academy) is an observatory named after V. A. Mikhelson, in the north of the city (from 1879 to May 1948 it was the main meteorological station in Moscow).
- The Moscow (Baltschug) weather station, in the city center, near the Kremlin, has been operating since 1946.
- The Moscow (Tushino) weather station (operating since 1987) is located in the north-west of the city.
- Nemchinovka weather station (in the west of the city, next to the MKAD).
- Moscow Weather station (Mikhailovskoye) (operating since 1961).
- Meteorological post Moscow (Izmailovo) (operating since 1971) in the east of the city.

In addition, information from meteorological stations located on the territory of Moscow's Vnukovo and Ostafevo airports, Zhukovsky (airport), Domodedovo and Sheremetyevo airports near Moscow is used. Also on the territory of the city there were other, now closed meteorological stations: Moscow (Krylatskoye), Moscow (Losinoostrovskaya), Lenino-Dachnoye, as well as meteorological posts: Moscow (Teply Stan), Moscow (ZIL), Moscow (Khoroshevo), Belorussky railway Station, Moscow (Karacharovo). In addition, as part of the program to increase the meteorological network, automatic meteorological stations were installed: Moscow (Butovo), Moscow (Strogino), Moscow (Tolstopaltsevo).

== The Seasons ==
=== Winter ===
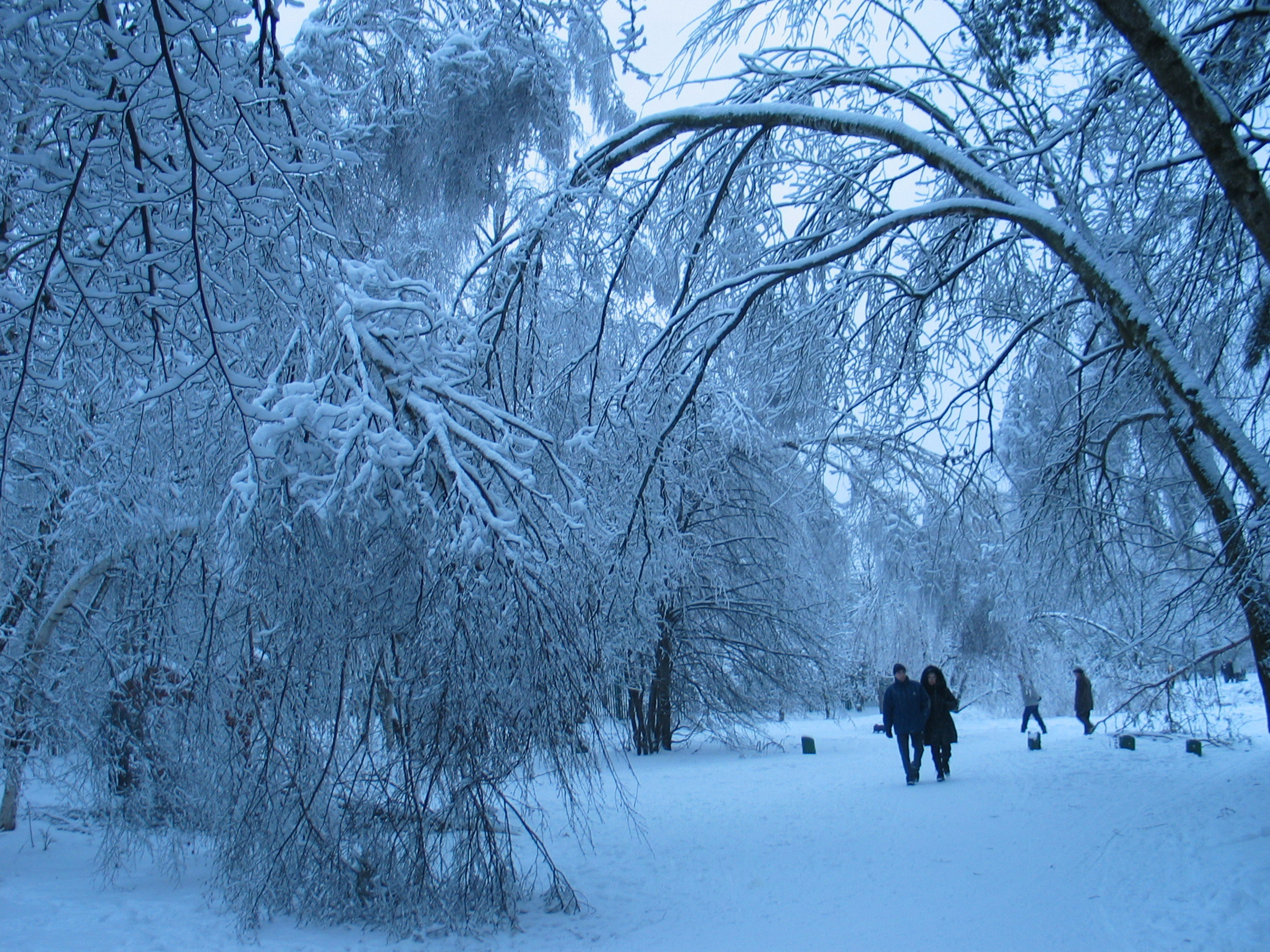
Icy trees in Moscow after the rain on December 25, 2010. Most of the bent trees straightened out after the thaw.

Winter in Moscow is moderately frosty, but with thaws that can take from 3–5 days to half or more of winter. At the same time, thaws are usually mild in calendar winter (temperatures do not exceed - 2.. 0 °C), with precipitation mainly in the form of sleet and ice, so snow cover in Moscow persists throughout the winter, unlike, for example, in the Baltic States, where the influence of the Atlantic is more pronounced.

The coldest winter with an average temperature of -26.8 °C was observed in 1892-1893, when the average monthly temperature in January was -31.6 °C. The warmest winter with an average temperature of - 2.0 °C was in 2019-2020, when the average monthly temperature in January was - 1 °C. In the current century, the coldest winter with an average temperature of -19.8 °C was recorded in 2009-2010, when the average monthly temperature in January was -34.5 °C. The fewest days with thaws (3) were in the winters of 1928-1929 and 1940-1941, the most (73) in the winter of 2019-2020. The snowiest winter with a maximum snow cover height of 50 cm was in 2019-2020, and the snowiest was in 1993-1994 (178 cm). The driest winter was observed in 1890-1891, when 27.4 mm of precipitation fell. The lowest maximum of the calendar winter (+1 °C) was observed in the winter of 1940-1941, the highest maximum (+3.6 °C) — in the winter of 2008-2009. The mildest winter with a minimum of -18 °C was in 2019-2020, the most severe with a minimum of -52.2 °C was in 1939-1940. The air temperature dropped below -50 °C in the winters of 1892-1893, 1939-1940, 1941-1942 and, according to unofficial data [what?], in the winter of 1978-1979. In the 21st century, the air temperature has never dropped below -50 °C or even below -48 °C, and only once has it dropped below -47 °C — in January 2006 (January 18 and 19).

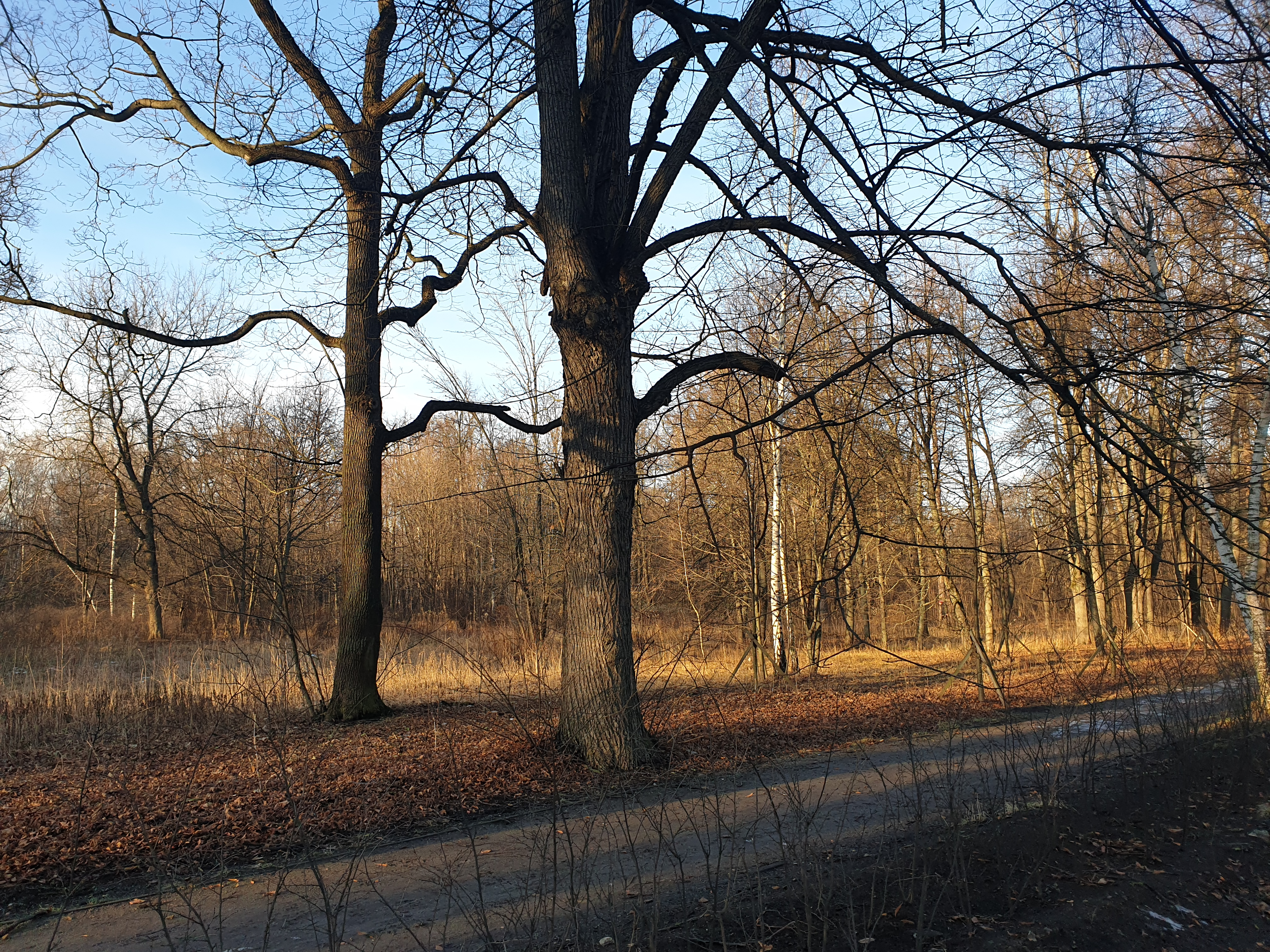
Total snowmelt in Moscow, January 18, 2020

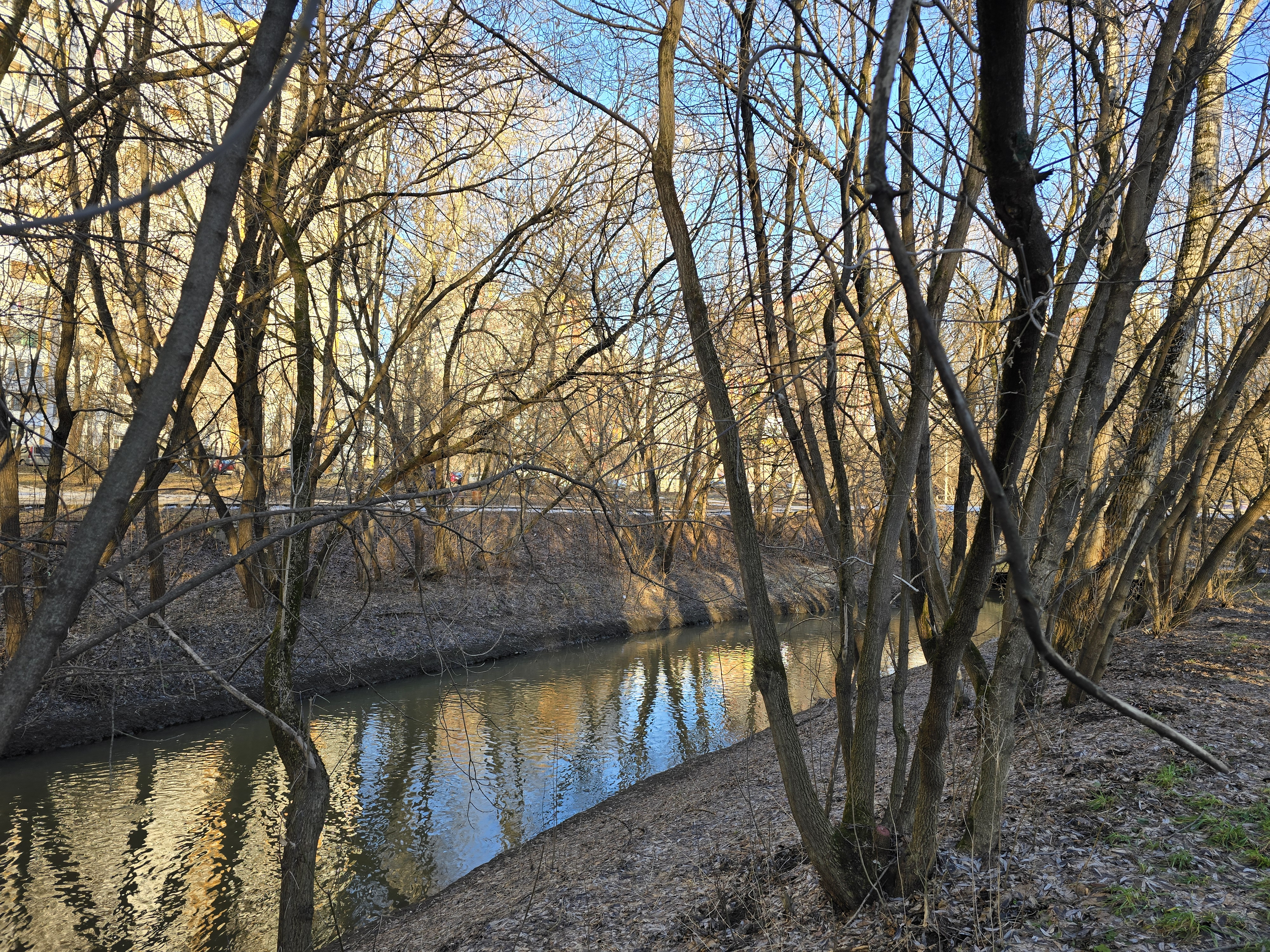
Complete snowmelt in Moscow on January 19, 2025, Setun River Valley

Thaws most often occur in the first half of winter (in this case, they are often a continuation of late autumn). The weather is often unstable (for example, the average daily temperature can drop from -5 to -20 °C in just 2–3 days and then rise again to -5 °C in about the same period), but unlike other seasons, daily temperature fluctuations in winter are small — due to the predominance of cloudy weather, the difference between daytime and night temperatures It usually does not exceed 5 °C (unlike the "summer" 10-12). In the 21st century, winters have become noticeably warmer than before the 1970s and 1980s. For example, the average monthly temperature in January 2020 turned out to be negative (-1 °C) for the first time in the history of observations. The minimum temperature in January was an unusual -10.8 °C for Moscow, which is the highest minimum in January. At the same time, December 2019, which preceded it, was even warmer with an average monthly temperature of - 2 °C and a minimum of only -12.2 °C, which is also the highest minimum in December. In 2025, the 2020 record for the average monthly temperature in January (-1 °C) was repeated. In addition, in the 21st century, there have been cases when the snow cover in Moscow completely disappears in mid-January; for example, in 2007, January 18, 2020, and January 11 and 18, 2025. Previously, in most winters, prolonged frosts occurred (from 1-2 to 10–15 weeks), when the activity of the Atlantic subsides, and the cold collapses in the rear of the southern or diving cyclones, or the Scandinavian or Arctic anticyclone shifts to the European part of Russia. Then the temperature can drop below -30 °C at night, and rarely rise above - 5 °C during the day. In the 21st century, the longest period without a thaw was in the winter of 2009-2010: frosts came to Moscow on December 29, 2009 and lasted for almost 2 months — until February 24, 2010.

In the 21st century, the trend is slowly moving towards protracted thaws, which can last up to half the duration of the winter period. In general, winter comes later in the 21st century than in the last decades of the 20th century, so in 2006, 2008, 2011, 2015 and 2019, meteorological winter began in the second decade of December or later. The winters of 2008-2009, 2011-2012, 2014-2015, 2015-2016, 2019-2020 and 2024-2025 were particularly warm..

Precipitation in winter falls mainly in the form of snow, but rain is possible, which has often been observed in recent years. The snow cover is usually 30-40 cm high.

Meteorological winter (that is, the period with an average daily temperature below 0 °C) lasts about 131-132 days, usually starting in mid-November and ending in the third decade of March, according to the norms of the 1980s and 2020s, but a noticeable warming over the period of the 1990s and 2020s, or even over 2000-2025, gives us the right to assert that winter has reduced its duration to an average of 108-114 days over the period of the 1990s and 2020s, or even to 99-102 days over the period of 2000-2025.

=== Spring ===
Spring is the most unstable time of the year in Moscow. In March and April, daily temperature fluctuations are highest and can exceed 5 °C.

Over the past two decades, March has become a month with positive temperatures, but the month itself has retained rather unstable trends, and for example, over the past decade there have been positive records in March (March 25, 2014 +12.7 °C is an absolute record in the history of meteorological observations) and negative records (March 18, 2018 -20.7 °C - record for a century).

From year to year, depending on atmospheric circulation, March can be either completely spring (with a complete absence of snow cover and the beginning of vegetation by the end of the month), or completely winter (with frosts up to -25 °C and below). Nevertheless, the first month of the calendar spring can still be considered a winter month rather than a spring month, for example in 1991, 1993, 1994, 1997, 1998, 1999, 2000, 2001, 2003, 2006, 2009, 2011, 2012, 2021 and especially in 2005, 2013 and 2018, March turned out to be quite It was frosty, but in terms of temperature indicators it did not differ much from February of the same years.

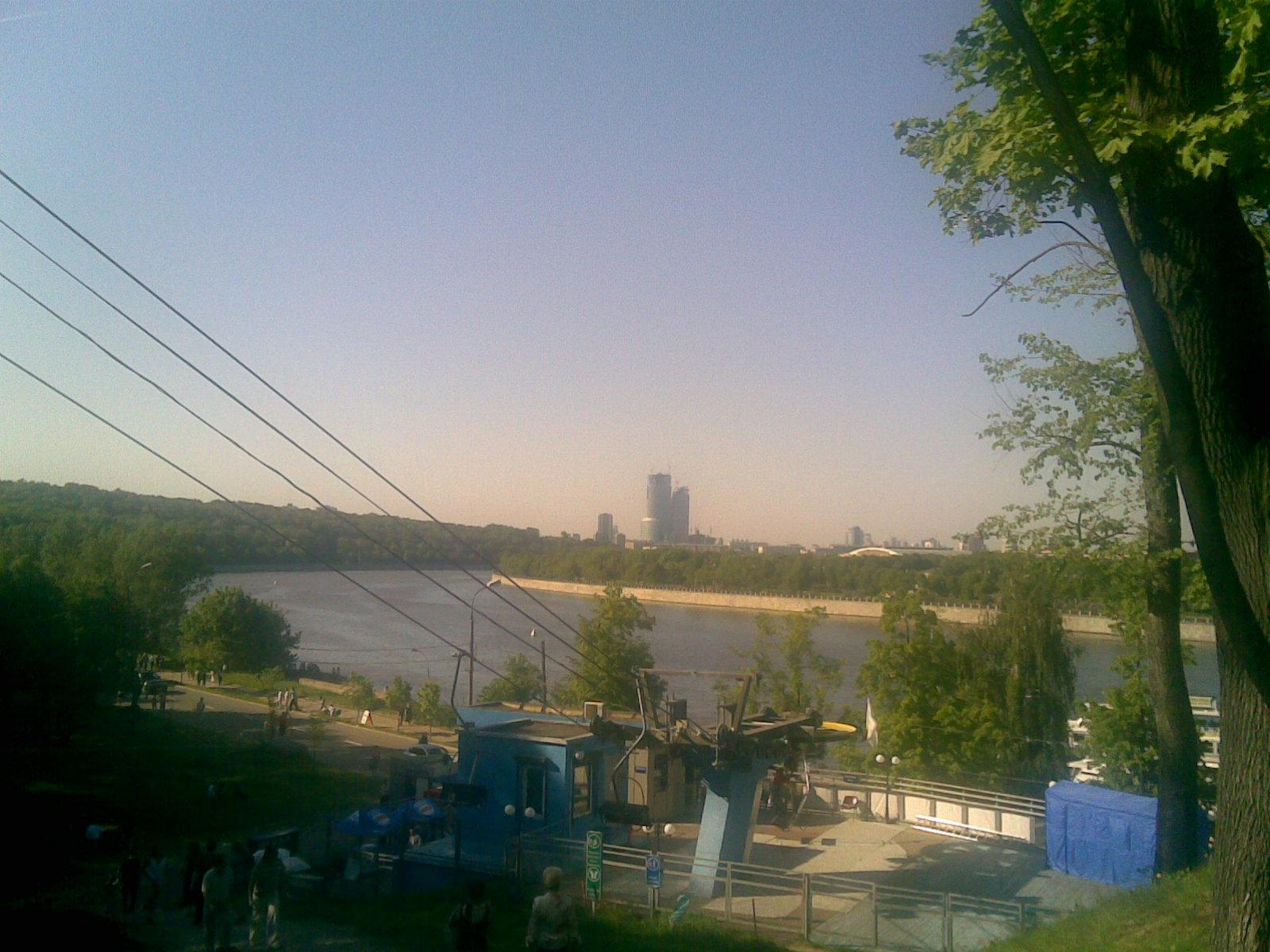
Vorobyovy Gory. The heat wave at the end of May 2007

The significant length of daylight hours and frequent thaws (the average maximum of the month reaches +3 °C) remind of the approach of spring in March. The longitude of the day at the end of the month is 13 hours, and the sun is at the same height as in mid-autumn. Due to this, the air temperature on some days can reach +0..+7 °C, sometimes +10 °C at the end of the month, although the meteorological spring in Moscow usually occurs after the vernal equinox, in the third decade of March, when the average daily temperature becomes positive and the snow cover begins to fall.

If April as a whole retained the status of a fairly stable month, with rare returns of cold weather and deviations from temperature norms, with the exception of April 2025, which was able to set temperature records close to the values of June in a calendar month and temporarily restore snow cover, then May repeats the fate of March, being a transitional month and the weather it has a rather unpredictable character. So May 2007, 2012, 2013, 2018, 2019, 2021, And partly 2024 can be called the summer months.; but in the same year, 2024, despite the earlier start of the meteorological summer, the weather pattern changed too abruptly in a month, so snow fell on May 9, and summer began in Moscow on May 17.

=== Summer ===
Summer in Moscow is moderately hot with an average high temperature of +15 °C in June to +16..+18 °C in July and August. Several times during the summer, hot weather can reach +23..+25 °C during the day, and above +10 °C at night, but as a rule, such heat does not linger for more than 3–4 days, and is replaced by a thunderstorm, knocking down the temperature to +23..+25 °C.

Meteorological summer (the period from the time when the average daily temperature is at least +14 °C for more than 5 consecutive days to the time when the average daily temperature is below +15 °C for more than 5 consecutive days) in Moscow lasts on average 108 days: from mid — late May to early September. The maximum duration of meteorological summer reached 136 days and was observed in 2024, when summer lasted from May 17 to September 29.

- The greatest amount of precipitation falls in July — 84 mm.
- On average, the temperature exceeds +23 °C for 5–6 days per season.

The beginning of summer is characterized mainly by unstable weather, with a succession of warm and cool days; thunderstorms are frequent, and hail is possible. In some years, destructive squalls were recorded (June 25, 1957, June 20, 1998, May 29, 2017) and even tornadoes (June 1904).

In July, the anticyclonic type of weather usually prevails. In some years, there is also cold weather with daytime temperatures around +15 °C and night temperatures below +10 °C, but it usually lasts for several days, as the sun quickly warms up the cold air. The peak of the summer heat in Moscow and the peak of the greatest fire danger in the Moscow region occur in late July and early August.

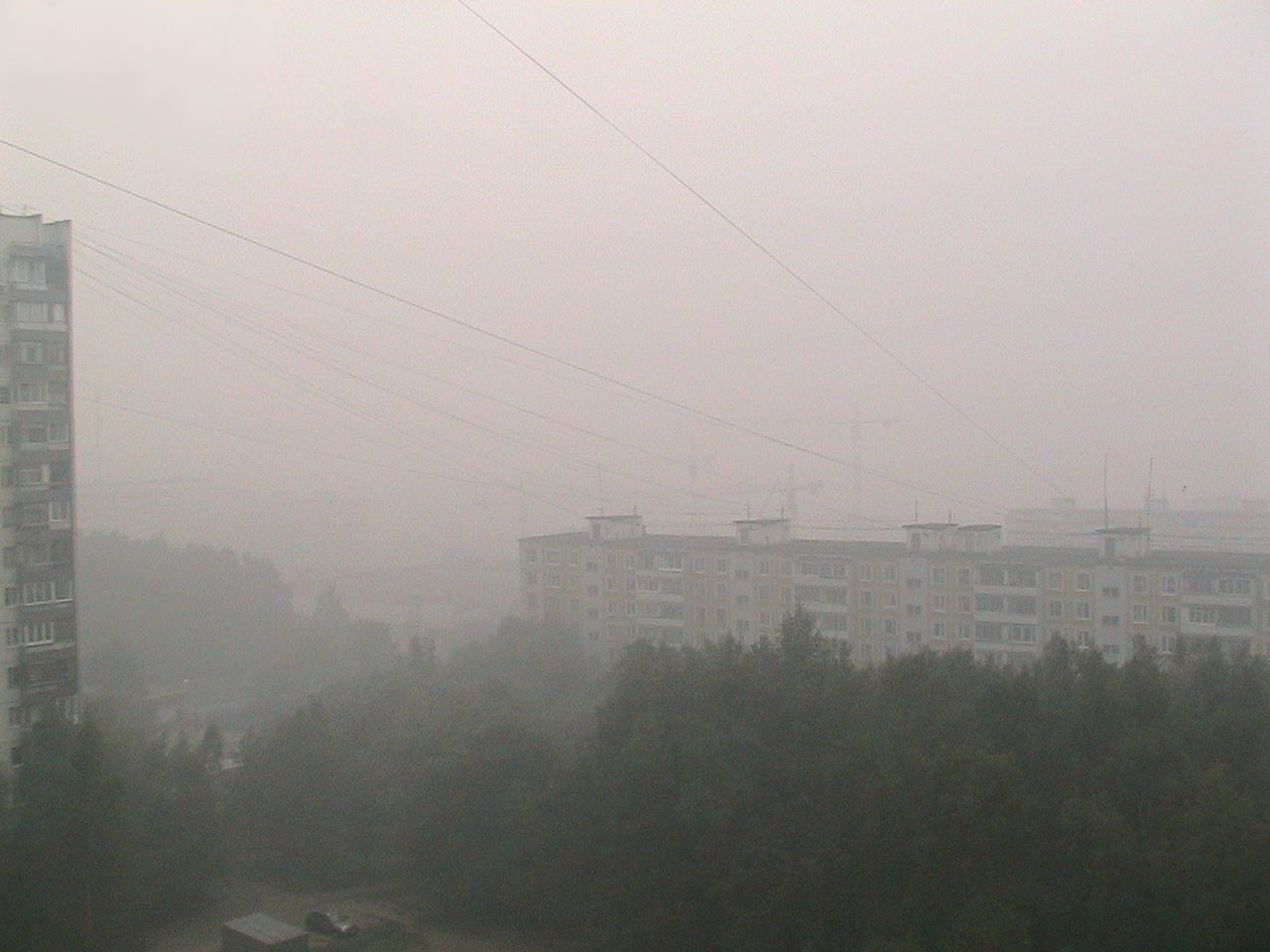
Smog in Moscow. August 6, 2010 12:55 PM

August is characterized by warm and even moderately hot days (up to +22 °C and above), but the nights are gradually getting colder due to a reduction in daylight hours and an increase in darkness, although this is noticeable mainly outside the city, the nights are much warmer within Moscow. The second half of August is already making itself felt more clearly by signs of approaching autumn: leaves on trees are beginning to turn yellow, etc. The average daily temperature in August decreases from 18.9 °C on the 1st to 14.4 °C on the 31st; the third decade of this month is usually "autumn" according to climatic signs.

August can also remind you of the approaching autumn with rainy and wet weather. August 2016 turned out to be especially rainy, when 87.8 mm of precipitation (107% of the monthly norm) fell in a day on August 15, which is an absolute record for Moscow in the history of meteorological observations. Numerous floods were recorded, and in the area of Agricultural Street, the Yauza River overflowed its banks.

It's been a hot summer in the 21st century 2001, 2002, 2007, 2010, 2011, 2016, 2021, 2022 and 2024, and the summer of 2010 was the hottest on record, when numerous temperature records were set. July 2014 was the driest July in the history of meteorological observations in Moscow (only 4.4 mm of precipitation fell), August 2016 was the wettest August on record (166.6 mm of precipitation). The summers of 2003 and 2017 were cool (but within normal limits) due to cold Junes (the summer of 2017 also due to a cold July), as was the summer of 2019 due to a cold July and cool August, and the summer of 2025 due to an unstable August.

=== Autumn ===
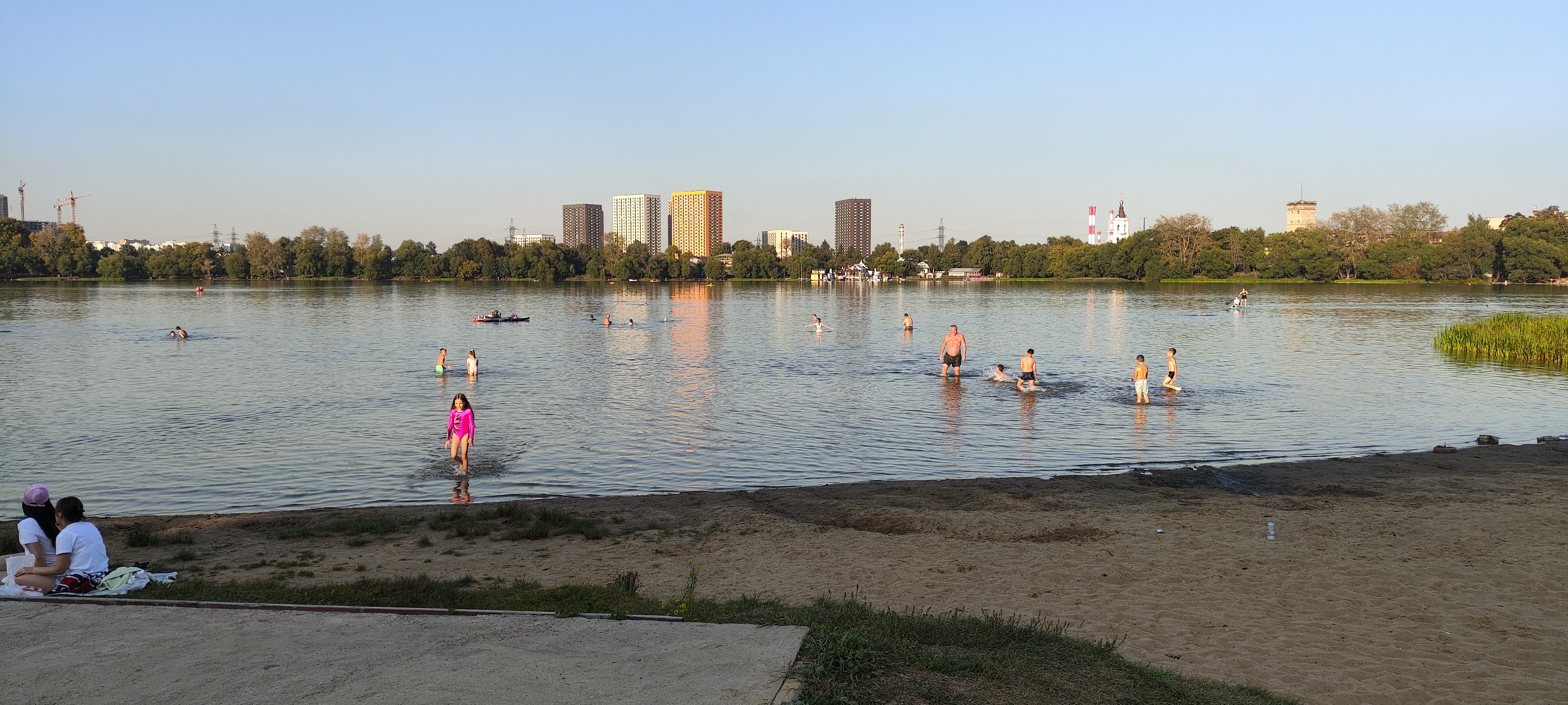
The beach on Lake Beloe in Kosino on September 7, 2024

Autumn in Moscow is protracted, with frequent returns of heat, but despite this, autumn is the most stable time of the year. Summer ends with a drop in the average daily temperature below +15 °C, which in 1991-2010 occurred in the last days of August, and in the last decade — in the first days of September. September is usually characterized by warm and dry weather with daytime temperature readings of +16..+18 °C and +8..+10 °C at night. There are both cold days with cloudy and rainy weather, as well as summer heat returns to +20...+25 °C during the day — the so-called Indian summer. At the same time, the nights are already cold, and the first frosts arrive in late September and early October. But in the last decade, September has tended to increase the average monthly temperature to about summer values, and September 2018, 2023, 2024, 2025 can be called summer months altogether.

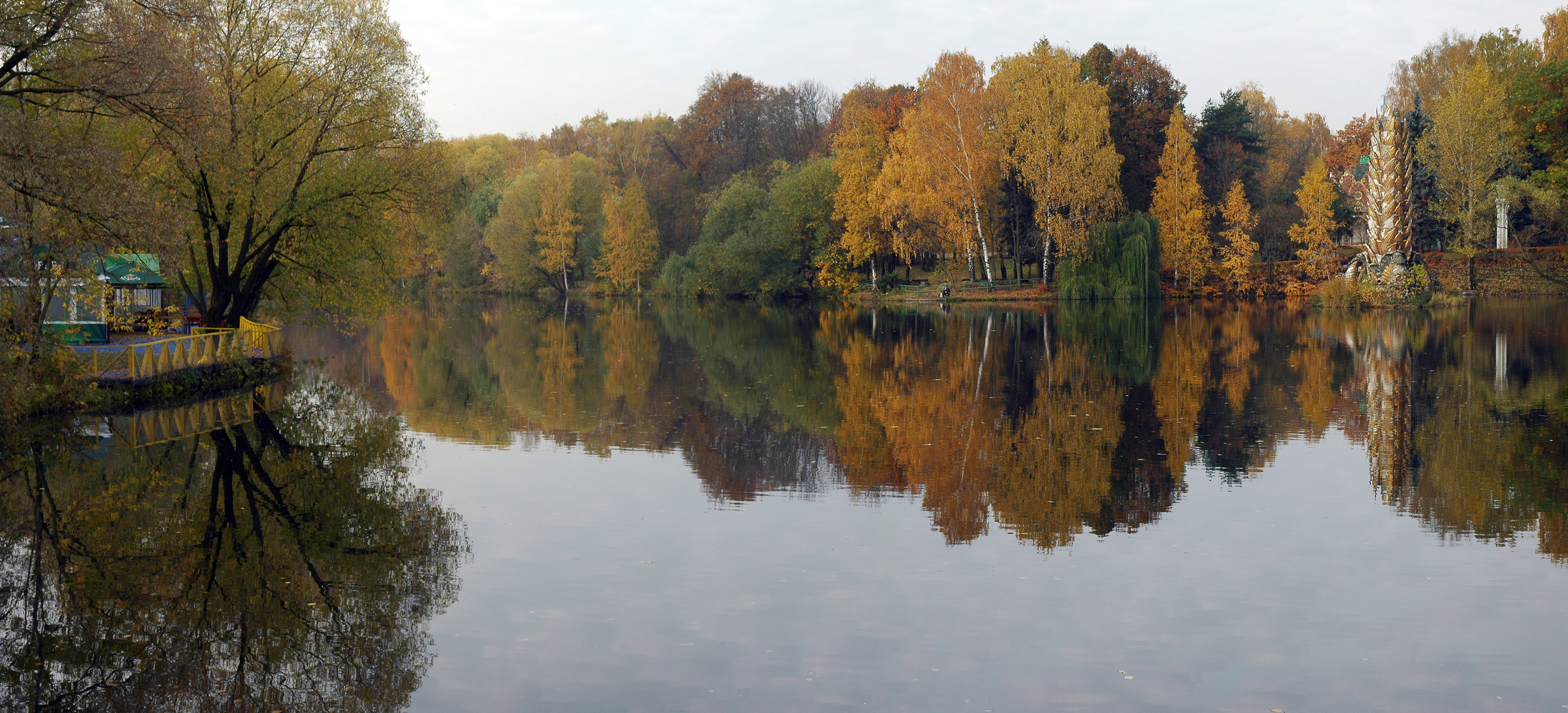
Golden Ear fountain in autumn. October 2009

In early October, autumn fully comes into its own. Thermometers usually reach +10 during the day..+12 °C, and at night +4..+6 °C. In the first half of the month, heat returns are still possible, when the daytime is up to +15..20 °C, and at night about +10 °C (in the 21st century, such heat occurs almost annually in October, and is no longer considered abnormal). But since mid-October, the weather has finally set course for winter: it becomes especially wet and stormy, the daylight hours are less than 10 hours, it freezes more often at night, sometimes the first snow falls (usually only flying in the air). The average daily temperature drops below +5 °C on October 20. At the same time, a large anticyclone often arrives in the center of Russia in the third decade of October — early November, which sets the air temperature high enough for this time for several days — up to +10..+15 °C.

The first (temporary) snow cover usually forms in the last days of October — the first days of November. As a rule, it melts immediately, because the soil has not yet cooled down enough, and also at this time the activity of western transport is high, which allows the average daily temperature to remain positive. Cloudy weather prevails sharply in November (due to the high humidity of the atmosphere), although during the passage of anticyclones, the weather is sometimes very warm for November (up to +10 °C and above during the day). In some years, the first snow is accompanied by ice. This was the case, in particular, on October 30–31, 2012, when the heaviest icy rain fell on Moscow. Icy supercooled rain falling at subzero air temperatures was also observed in Moscow on November 3, 2014. The average daily temperature drops below 0 °C in mid-November, and stable snow cover and general winter weather patterns are established at the end of November. However, in recent years, due to climate change, winter has often begun to occur later than normal: in winters 2005-2006, 2008-2009, 2009–2010, 2011-2012, 2014-2015, 2020-2021, 2021-2022 and in 2024-2025, there was no stable snow cover and severe frosts until early or mid-December; in the winter of 2015-2016, until the end of December; in the winters 2006-2007, 2013-2014 and 2017-2018 before the beginning or until the middle of January; and in the winter of 2019-2020, until the end of January or the beginning of February. At the same time, there were years of abnormally early snowfall and the onset of winter (1993 — late October, 2007 — early November, 2016 — late October). September 2024 in Moscow became the warmest for all time of meteorological observations since 1779 with an average monthly temperature of +17.1 °C (the previous record was +17.0 °C and belonged to 1847, that is, the record was beaten by the lowest possible 0.1 °C).

== Climate change ==
In recent decades, especially since the 1970s, the city's climate has been getting warmer, and the average annual temperature has been rising. The reasons for this process may be both global warming and the natural cyclical climate, as well as the continued growth of the city (an increase in population, the number of cars, etc.).

Average temperature over the decade:

- 1969—1978 — +4,8 °C
- 1979—1988 — +5,0 °C
- 1989—1998 — +5,7 °C
- 1999—2008 — +6,3 °C
- 2009—2018 — +6,8 °C
- 2019—2028 — +7,3 °C (In fact, it is already higher for 2025 +7,8 °C)
- 2029—2038 — +7,8 °C - forecast
- 2039—2048 — +8,3 °C - forecast
- 2049—2058 — +8,8 °C - forecast
- 2059—2068 — +9,3 °C - forecast
- 2069—2078 — +9,8 °C - forecast
- 2079—2088 — +10,3 °C - forecast
- 2089—2098 — +10,8 °C - forecast

The warming is uneven throughout the year, for example, December and January have warmed significantly in winter, the temperature in February has increased slightly; in spring, the temperature in March and April has increased, and the temperature in May has decreased slightly.

According to 1981-2010 norms, January was the coldest month. However, while January significantly increased average monthly temperatures compared to 1960-1990 norms, February has become a contender for the title of coldest month, almost approaching January in average monthly temperatures. This is due to the fact that by February, Atlantic activity declines, and the flow of cyclones decreases. The frequency of anticyclones, which bring frosty and dry weather, increases. But this trend began to change when observing the climate in the period 2000-2025. February over the past 25 years has become warmer by almost +1 °C, while January has become a rather unstable month, from year to year, its average monthly temperature difference was 14.6 °C, from -14.5 °C in January 2010, to +0.1 °C in January 2020, 2025. And the difference in average monthly temperatures in February over 25 years was more modest -11.4 °C, February 2012 with a record for 25 years -11.7 °C and -0.3 °C for February 2020 (although at the Leninskiye Gorki weather station, 9 km from the administrative border of Moscow, February 2020 had the same temperature as January 2020 +0.1 °C). In conclusion, it can be confidently stated that although February is colder than January in different years, January still maintains its position as the coldest month in Moscow's climate.

During the 2000-2025 observation period, September significantly increased in average monthly temperatures, by +1.1 °C, December by +0.9 °C, and March, along with it, became the month with a positive average monthly temperature. February, June, and August increased by +0.8 °C, April and November by +0.7 °C, and October by +0.5 °C.

But there are also noticeable colder temperatures, namely July became -0.1 °C colder, but if this amplitude is typical for it over a long period of observation, then May, although it increased, due to the first half of the observed period 2000-2025, by +0.2 °C, but since 2017 there has been a tendency for the average monthly temperature to decrease, so May of the first five-year period of the 2020s became noticeably colder than May of the 2010s and 2000s.

== Wind ==
=== Speed of wind ===
The average wind speed is very high. In the city it is near 5 metres per second; in open places and airports it may top 6 metres per second.

==== Wind Storms and Tornadoes ====
A few times per season, often in the May–September period during thunderstorms, wind speed may exceed 15–35 metres per second. The last powerful wind storm was in 1998, when wind speed was 30–35 metres per second. 157 persons were injured, 8 died, and 2157 buildings were damaged.

Tornadoes were recorded in 1904 and 1945 in Moscow and in 1970, 1971, the 1984 Yaroslavl tornado, 1987, 1994, and 1997 in Moscow Oblast 100 km south-east from Moscow (near Zaraysk), in 2005 in Dubna, and on 3 August 2007 in Krasnogorsk.

In the 3 June 2009 tornado, F3 registered near Sergiyev Posad, Moscow oblast.

Jan	Feb	Mar	Apr	May	Jun	Jul	Aug	Sep	Oct	Nov	Dec	year
2.5	2.5	2.5	2.5	2.2	2.1	1.9	1.8	2.0	2.4	2.5	2.6	2.3

== Сloudiness and day light ==
=== Number of clear, cloudy and overcast days ===
On average Moscow has 1731 hours of sunshine in a year. In 2004–2008, near 1800–2000 hours.

	Jan	Feb	Mar	Apr	May	Jun	Jul	Aug	Sep	Oct	Nov	Dec	year
Clear (sunshine)	8	9	10	8	11	7	8	10	8	5	3	4	82
Partial sunshine	11	10	13	17	16	20	20	17	16	13	9	10	184
Cloudy (overcast)	12	9	9	5	4	3	4	4	6	12	18	17	98

=== Daylight, average number of hours/day ===
Duration of daylight depends on geographical position of Moscow. It varies from 7 hours 00 minutes on December 22 to 17 hours 34 minutes on June 22. The maximum height of the sun above the horizon is 11° on 22 December and 58° on 22 June.

Near the day of the summer solstice (June 22), the sun does not fall below −12°, thus the nautical twilight occurs throughout this period. Nevertheless, lighting of the navigational twilight is not enough for normal human activity, so the streets need artificial illumination, and it is believed that there are no so-called white nights in Moscow, although the sky remains dark blue, and not black, as, for example, in southern Russia.

Hours	Jan (hours)	Feb (hours)	Mar (hours)	Apr (hours)	May (hours)	Jun (hours)	Jul (hours)	Aug (hours)	Sep (hours)	Oct (hours)	Nov (hours)	Dec (hours)
Day	7.9	9.7	11.9	14.3	16.3	17.4	16.8	14.9	12.7	10.5	8.4	7.2
Night	16.1	14.3	12.1	9.7	7.7	6.6	7.2	9.1	11.3	13.5	15.6	16.8

== See also ==
- VVC weather station
- Climate of Russia
- 1904 Moscow tornado
- 1984 Soviet Union tornado outbreak
- 2009 Krasnozavodsk tornado
