= 1904 Moscow tornado =

Catastrophic tornado in Russia

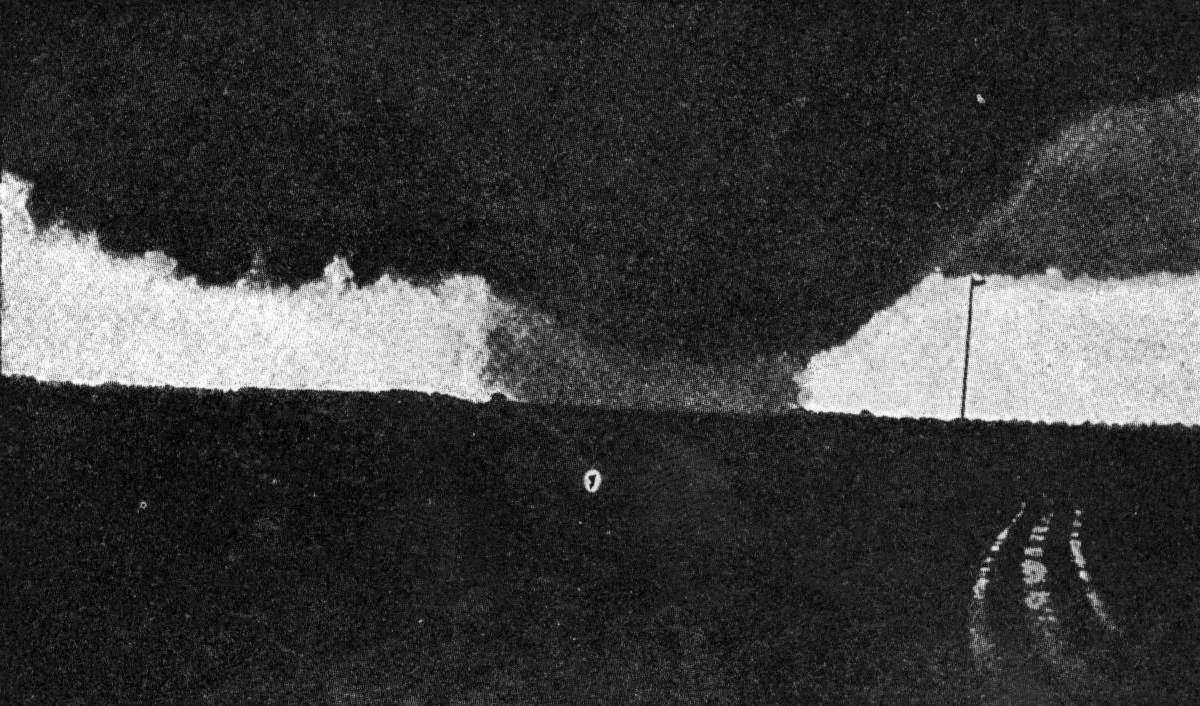
- The tornado observed from the Pererva station of the Moscow-Kursk railway

Meteorological history
- Formed: 29 June 1904
- Dissipated: 29 June 1904

F4 tornado
- on the Fujita scale

Overall effects
- Fatalities: 9-100+

The 1904 Moscow tornado was only one of three disastrous tornadoes that occurred in central Russia in recorded history (1984 Yaroslavl tornado occurred on 9 June 1984, in Ivanovo with Yaroslavl regions and 2009 Krasnozavodsk tornado occurred in Krasnozavodsk on 3 June 2009, located in Moscow region). The tornado started as a thunderstorm in Tula region. It travelled northward, passing through eastern suburbs of Moscow into Yaroslavl region. When the cloud approached remote Moscow suburbs, it formed three tornado funnels, destroying suburban settlements and Lefortovo district within the city itself.

== Contemporary reports ==
The main tornado was recorded by thousands of witnesses in Moscow, but few outside of the city. The Dean of Sukhanovo church reported that the cloud passed some 18 kilometers west from his town, through the villages of Kapotnya (200 homes destroyed), Chagino (65 out of 67 homes) and Khokhlovka; all three of these settlements are now within Moscow city limits. Nearer suburbs of Lyublino and Karacharovo were completely demolished too.

Many witnesses in Moscow, including the journalist Vladimir Gilyarovsky, report the same picture of the advancing storm: an unusual black cloud, 15–20 kilometers wide, advanced from south-east at estimated 25 meters per second (no instrumental wind readings were made). The tornado was preceded by a hailstorm and a sudden drop in temperature. Two black funnels, one from the sky, the other from the ground, merged into a wide tornado with a yellow fire-like light in the middle. Witnesses mistook this light for an explosion at some oil tanks that, indeed, were close to the path of tornado, but were spared from destruction.

The tornado broke into the city proper in Lefortovo District, destroying the freight yard of the Kursk railroad, then shaving off the Annenhof Forest – an old, neglected park in Lefortovo (north of the present-day Aviamotornaya subway station). It passed through the Lefortovo barracks, tearing roofs from masonry buildings, passed over the Basmanny District into Sokolniki Park and left the city in a northward direction. Apparently, the tornado faded away, thus destruction in the densely populated Basmanny was far less than in Lefortovo.

== Present-day assessment ==
Modern scientists rate the 1904 tornadoes at F2–F3 in the Fujita scale. However, the rating for the tornado was upgraded from F3 to F4 as listed in ESWD

Total damage is estimated at 3,000 single-family homes (Razuvaev), while the loss of life was not properly counted (Gilyarovsky reported seeing only one dead). The disaster occurred in the middle of the Russo-Japanese War, and clearing the rubble and counting the bodies was not a top priority; police reports and formal damage assessments were not published due to war-time censorship. Many of the victims are presumed to be squatters in suburban parks and the Annenhof Forest, which was cleared of fallen trees years after the incident.

== Other tornadoes ==
Other tornadoes were recorded in 1945 in Moscow and in 1951, 1956, 1970, 1971, 1984 (during the tornado outbreak of 9 June), 1987, 1994, and 1997 in Moscow Oblast 100 km south-east from Moscow (near Zaraysk). Another was seen in June 2009 near Sergiyev Posad.
