= 1984 Soviet Union tornado outbreak =

Tornado outbreak in Ivanovo and Yaroslavl Oblasts, RSFSR

Tornado outbreak
- Tornadoes: ≥10
- Max. rating: F4 tornado
- Highest winds: 418 km/h (260 mph)

Overall effects
- Fatalities: 72-403+
- Injuries: 804
- Part of the tornado outbreaks of 1984

The 1984 Soviet Union tornado outbreak, also known as the 1984 Ivanovo tornado outbreak, was a devastating and extremely deadly tornado outbreak that struck the Ivanovo and Yaroslavl regions north of Moscow, an area over 400,000 km^{2}, on June 9, 1984. It was one of only three disastrous tornado outbreaks (one of the others being the 1904 Moscow tornado) in modern Russian history, and the third-deadliest tornado outbreak in European history.

Based upon observed damages, the main tornado, an F4 in Ivanovo caused extreme damage, throwing heavy objects of 50,000 kilograms (110,000 lb) for distances up to 200 metres (0.12 mi). Severe thunderstorms also produced hail up to 1 kilogram (2.2 lb) in weight, among the heaviest hailstones confirmed worldwide. In all, the entire tornado outbreak killed at least 69 people (though the exact death toll is unknown) and injured 804. It was previously rated as an F5, however, recent reanalysis has lowered the rating to F4 in 2018 by the European Severe Storms Laboratory.

== Meteorological synopsis ==
On June 8, 1984, a negatively tilted trough caused an extratropical low pressure area to form over the coast of the Socialist Republic of Romania (now non-Communist Romania). Surface moisture moved north from the Black Sea and caused nearby dew points to rise to 20 °C (68 °F); though at that time these were restricted to Romania and the Ukrainian SSR, dew points were higher than average elsewhere. By 1800 UTC, developing thunderstorms over the Ukrainian SSR spread overnight into the Russian SFSR. Between 00 and 12 UTC on June 9, the strengthening low pressure area moved north-northeast over the northwestern Russian SFSR before undergoing occlusion. In the meantime, a strong cold front rapidly advanced along a line extending south from the surface low, then south of Minsk in the Byelorussian SSR (now Belarus), to near Bucharest. This front separated the drier air mass to the north from the warm, moist air mass near the Black Sea, and strong wind speeds near ground level caused vertical mixing. Therefore, dew points actually dropped before the first tornadoes formed, but nevertheless several factors overcame the lower dew points to produce tornadoes. Among these were a strong upper-level jet stream, clear skies causing daytime heating and instability, strong synoptic-scale lifting leading to ascension of updrafts, and high environmental lapse rates promoting thunderstorm development. All these factors combined to produce severe weather near Moscow. The tornadoes occurred in this region because an unstable and moist air mass, supported by warm sea surface temperatures over the Black Sea, had been in place four days before the outbreak began. The unusually strong intensity of the trough in the region on June 8–9, with a 500-millibar geopotential height measured at about 2.7 standard deviations below normal, also favored an intense tornado outbreak.

== Tornadoes ==
Confirmed tornadoes by Fujita rating
FU	F0	F1	F2	F3	F4	F5	Total
0	1	1	6	1	1	0	10

=== List of confirmed tornadoes ===
List of confirmed tornadoes — June 9, 1984
F#	Location	County	Time (UTC)	Path length	Damage
Soviet Union
F2	Alatyr	Volga Federal District	~0900	unknown	Details unknown
F2	Kanash	Volga Federal District	~0900	unknown	Details unknown
F1	Sheremetyevo International Airport	Central Federal District	0909	10 km (6.2 mi)	Tornado heavily damaged hangars at the airport and downed trees.
F3	Golubkovo to Bolshoe Sartovo	Central Federal District	~1100	100 kilometres (62 mi)	3 deaths - Tornado damaged or destroyed 31 homes, and heavily damaged 260 other buildings. Every structure in Bolshoy Sartovo had their roofs blown off. The village of Malsoye Sartovo was abandoned as a result of the tornado. As well a bus was torn open in Danilov killing the driver and several passengers.
F2	Volosovo	Volosovsky District	~1100	10.9 kilometres (6.8 mi)	ESWD mentions that the tornado damaged roofs, chimneys and partly destroyed walls.
F4	S of Ivanovo to Lunyovo (SE of Kostroma)	Central Federal District	1130	160 kilometres (99 mi)	92+ deaths - See section on this tornado
F0	Unknown	unknown	unknown	unknown	ESWD mentions that the outbreak produced an F0 tornado, though there is no information beyond this.
F?	Sormovo	Sormovsky City District	unknown	unknown	Unrated tornado produced a swath of tree damage.
F?	E of Sharya	Central Federal District	unknown	unknown	Unrated tornado produced a swath of tree damage.
F?	Unknown	unknown	unknown	unknown	ESWD mentions that the outbreak produced three F2 tornadoes, though there is no information beyond this.

=== Ivanovo, Ivanovo Oblast–Lunyovo, Kostroma Oblast ===
Ivanovo, Ivanovo Oblast–Lunyovo, Kostroma Oblast
- The tornado as seen from the Volga River.

F4 tornado
- on the Fujita scale
- Highest winds: 418 km/h (260 mph)

Overall effects
- Fatalities: 69-400
- Areas affected: Ivanovo/Lunyovo

This large, long-tracked, and devastating tornado, considered one of the worst in Russian history, destroyed numerous towns and villages along its path. Rated F4 on the Fujita scale, the 1130 metres tornado killed at least 69 people and injured more than 130 others. About 1,180 homes were also damaged, destroyed or leveled by the tornado. Some estimates indicate up to 95 deaths or even more, with some sources suggesting 400 deaths in the outbreak were all related to the Ivanovo tornado.

At 1130 UTC—other sources say 1205 UTC—this powerful multiple vortex tornado touched down 15 mi (24 km) south of Ivanovo. Near Ivanovo, the tornado snapped or bent pine, spruce, and birch trees about 1–3 m (3.3–9.8 ft) from ground level. In the town itself, the tornado picked up and cast aside a crane, weighing 320,000 kilograms (710,000 lb), and threw a water tank, weighing 50,000 kilograms (110,000 pounds), over a distance of 200 metres (0.12 mi). ESWD mentions that the tornado destroyed factory areas.

Near the Volga River, the tornado ripped up trees by their roots and destroyed many small huts. Steel water containers capable of holding 150 cubic metres (40,000 US gal) of water were carried 100 metres (330 ft) in the air and transported 1 km (0.62 mi) from their original site. Hail in association with the parent thunderstorm weighed up to 1 kilogram (2.2 lb), among the heaviest hailstones measured anywhere in the world; though the measurement came with few details, it is comparable to the world record, a hailstone also measuring 1 kg (2.2 lb) in Bangladesh on April 15, 1986. The F4 tornado tracked for 99 miles (160 km)—though some sources suggest only 80 kilometres (50 mi)—before dissipating near Lunyovo in Yaroslavl Oblast. It caused at least 92 deaths, though many others likely went unreported. The severity of the damage was rated F4; however, there are indications that the tornado may have attained F5 intensity.

== See also ==
- List of European tornadoes and tornado outbreaks
- 2022 Russian and Ukrainian tornado outbreak
