= VVC weather station =

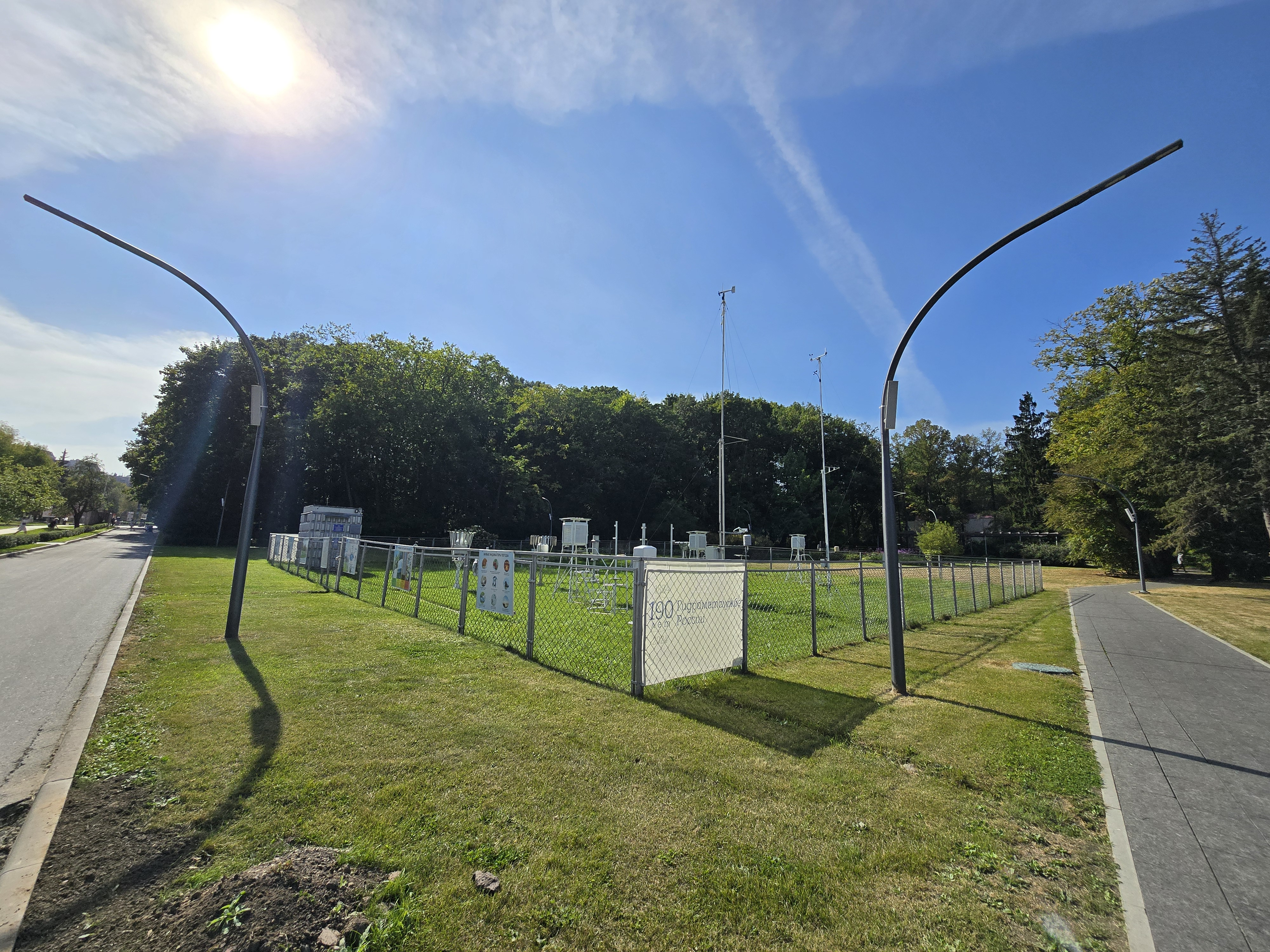
VDNKh weather station (Moscow) in september 2024

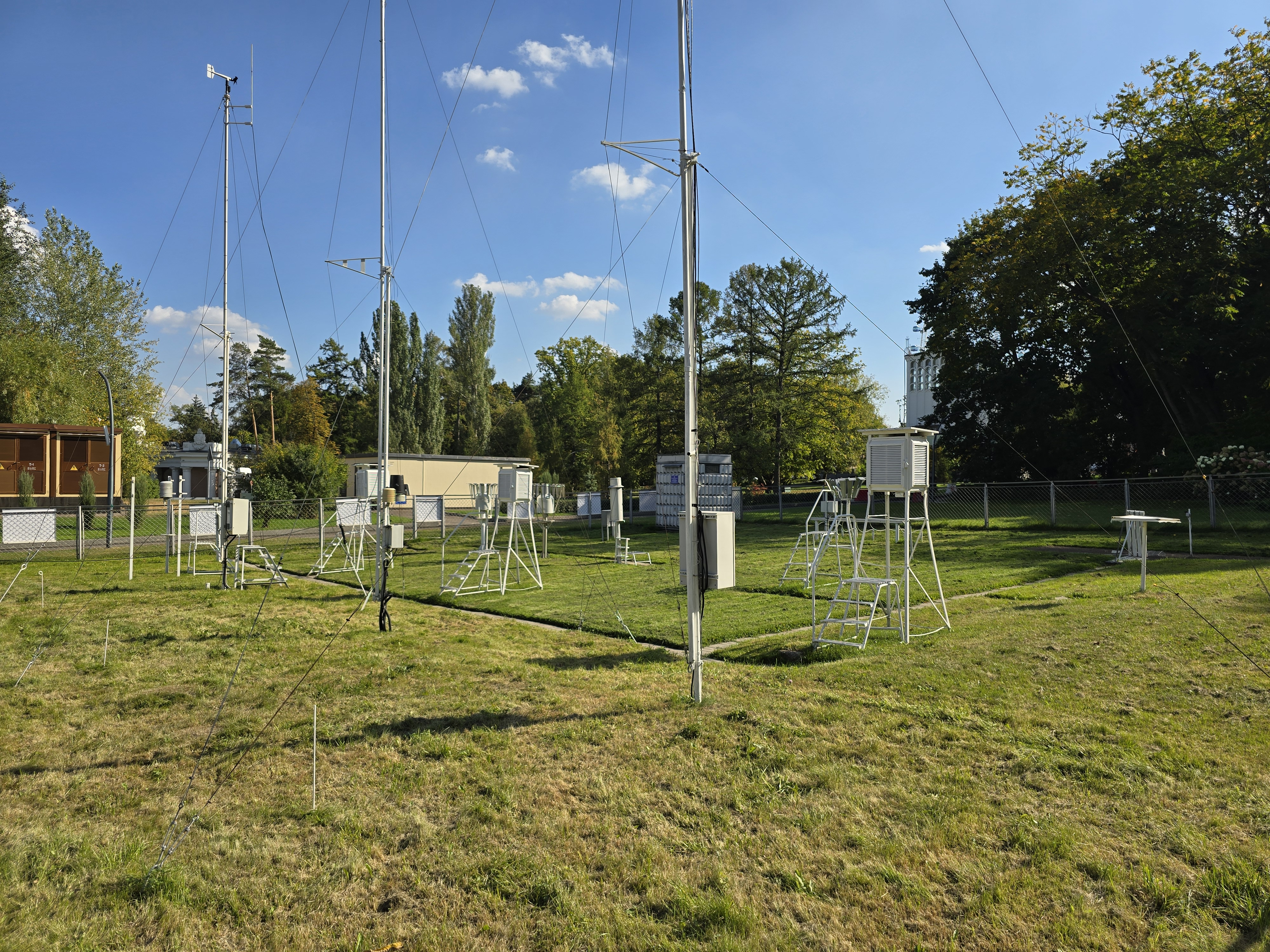
South-east view of station

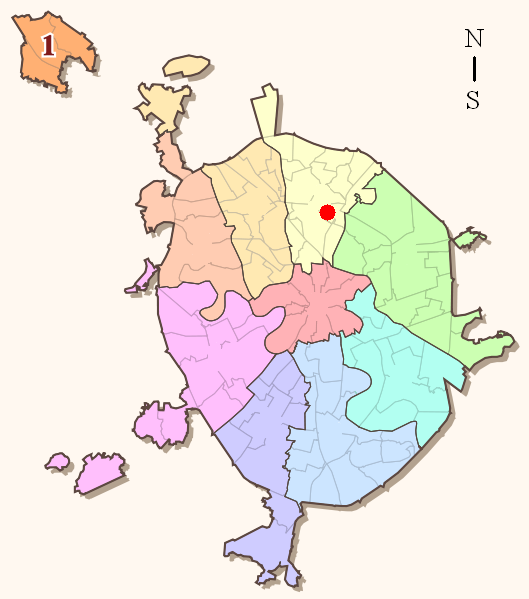
VVC weather station location

The VDNKh weather station is the principal weather station in Moscow, Russia. It opened in 1948 on the grounds of the All-Russia Exhibition Centre. The station's World meteorological organization classification index is 27612.

== History ==
The Moscow Agrometeorological station at the VSHV was opened on August 1, 1939, along with the main cascade, and operated for 11 months until July 1, 1940. Since the beginning of the war, it has been mothballed. It was only on May 20, 1948, that the 2nd-class meteorological station was reopened on the territory of the All-Russian Agricultural Academy. On June 10, 1949, it was reorganized into the agrometeorological station Moscow, VSHV, which still exists today under the name Moscow, VDNH. The station was moved several times within the territory of VDNKH, but the surrounding conditions did not change significantly..

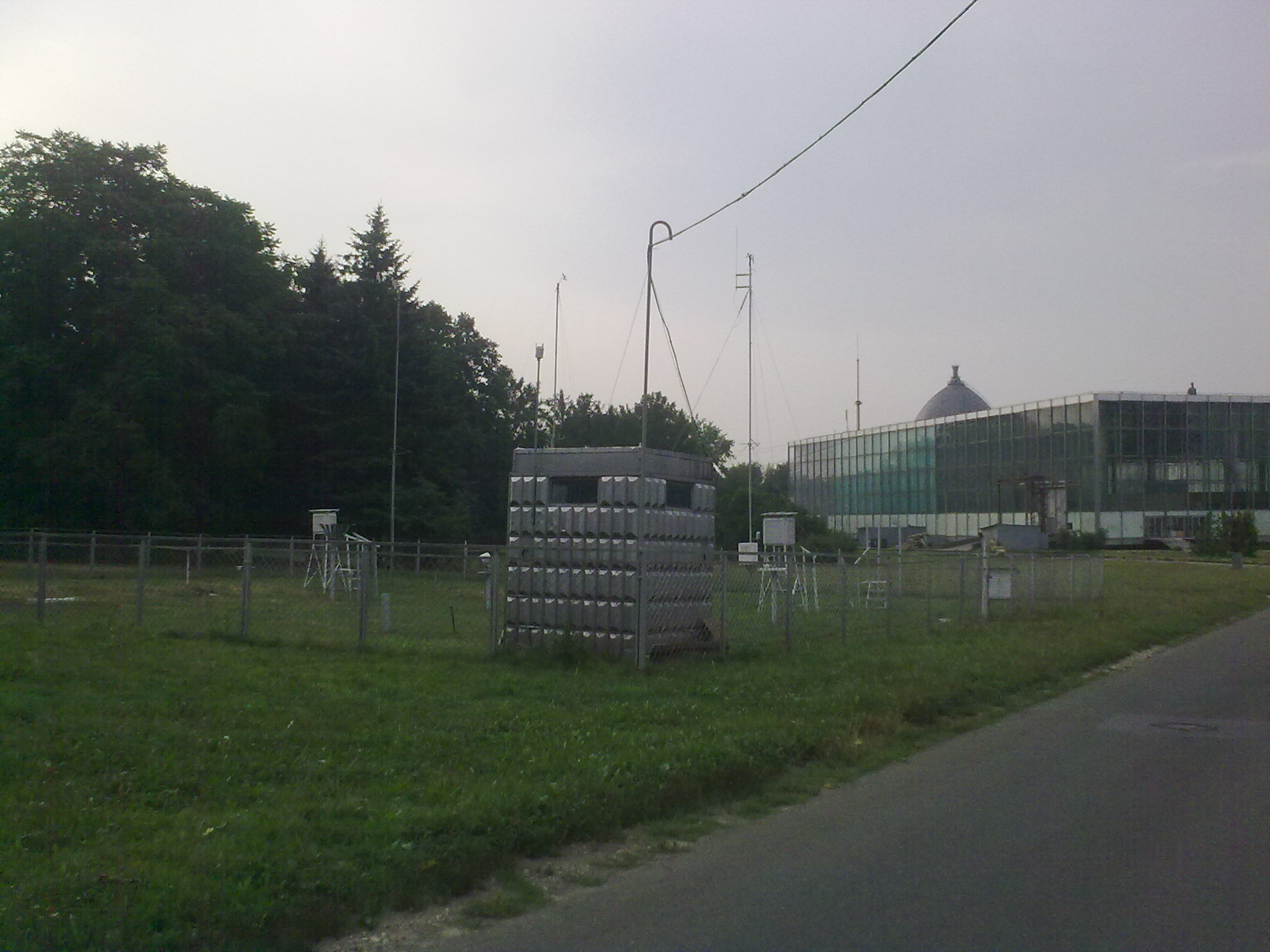
View to North-West (august 2010)

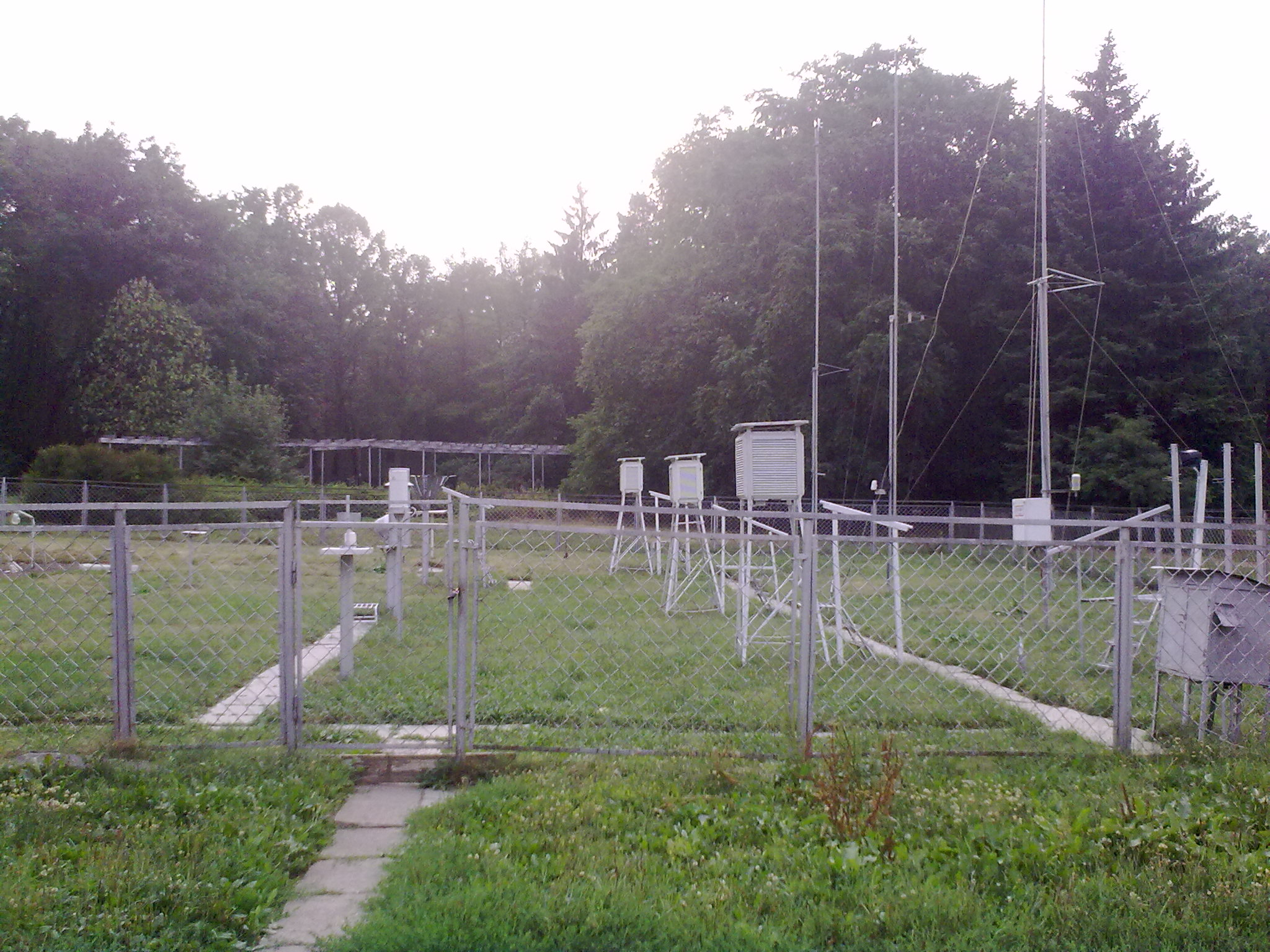
View to West (august 2010)

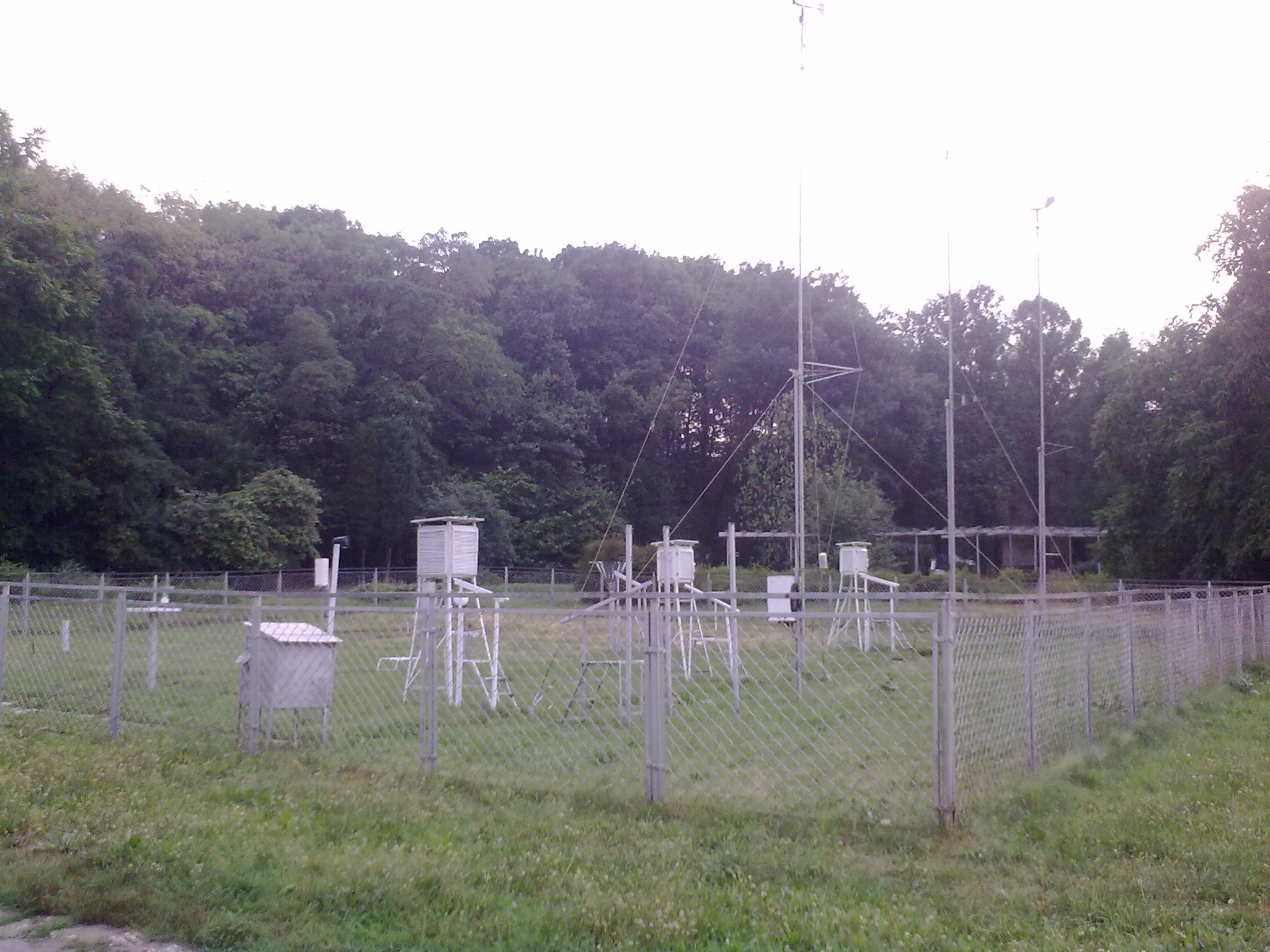
View to South-West (august 2010)

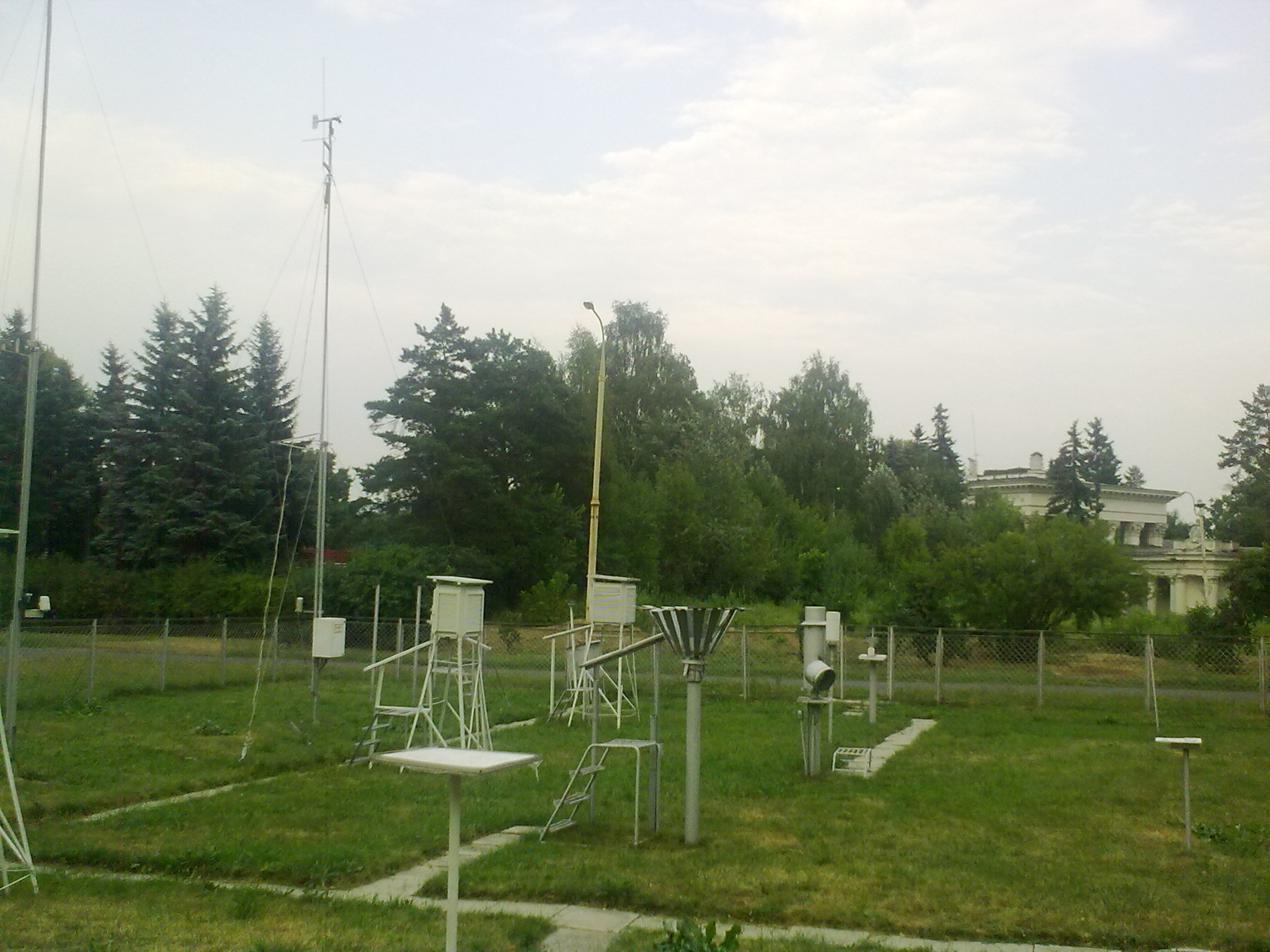
View to East (august 2010)

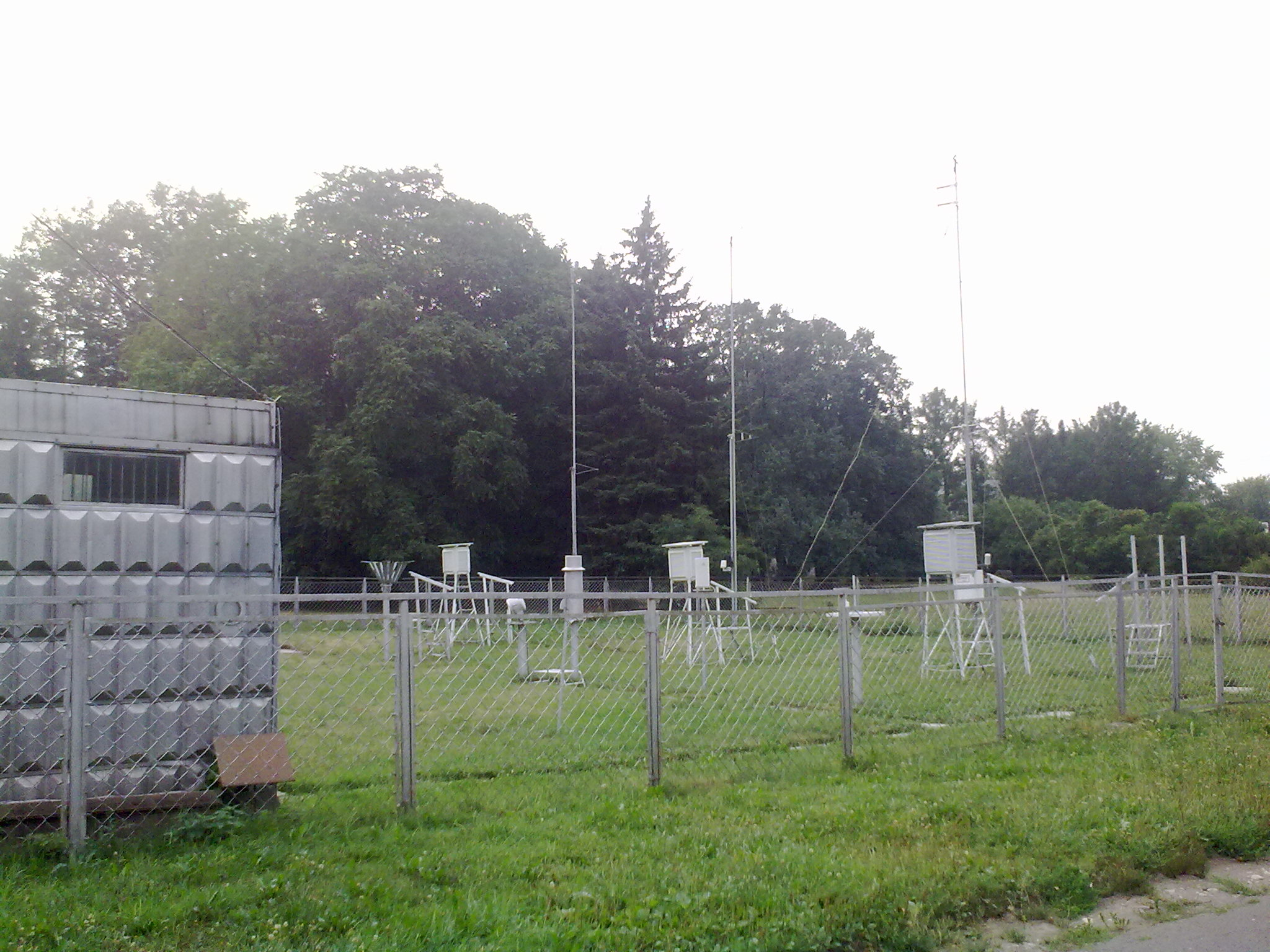
View to North-West (august 2010)

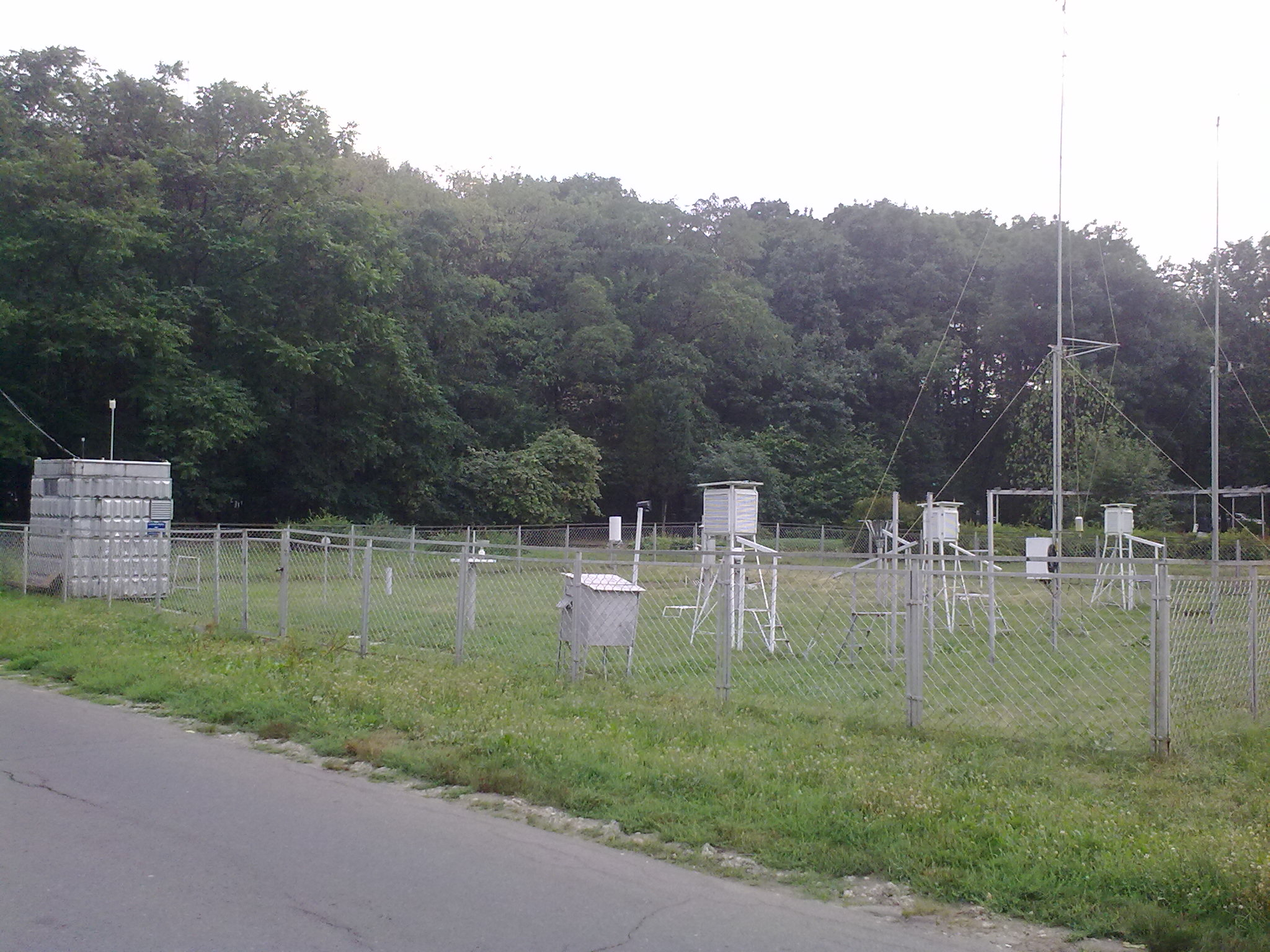
View to South-West (august 2010)

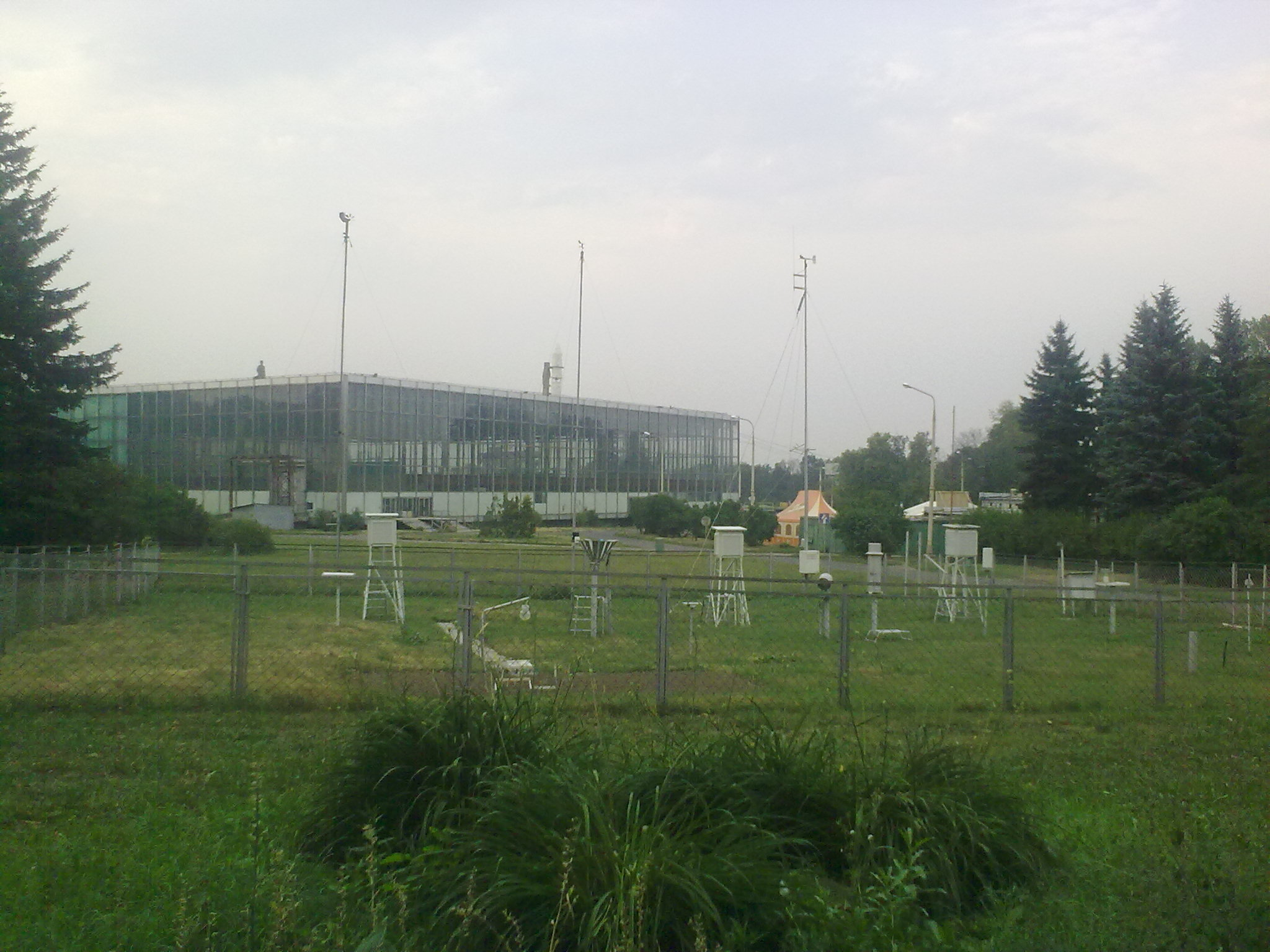
View to North (august 2010)

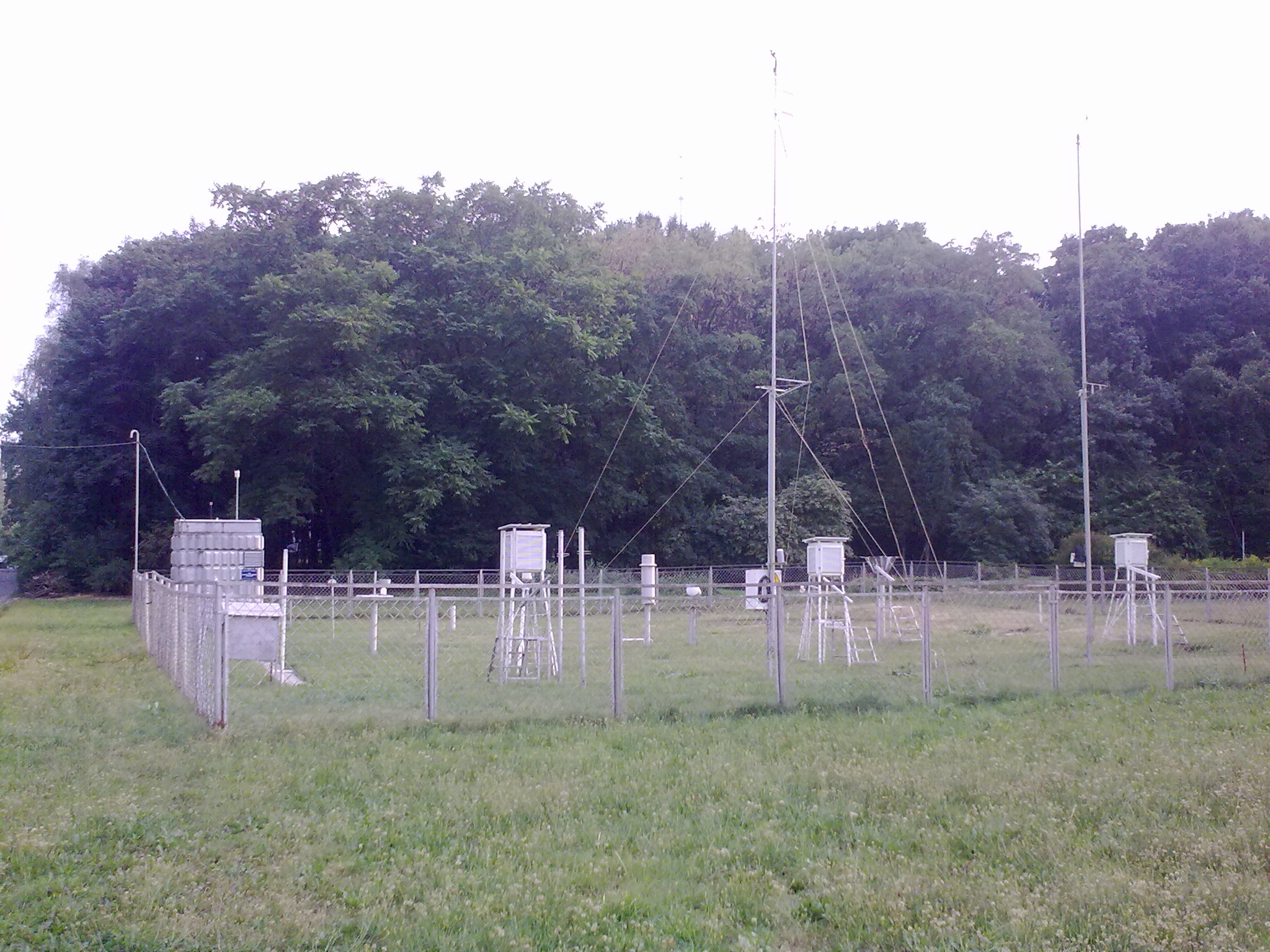
View to South (august 2010)

== Climatological data ==
Climate data for Moscow (weather records since 1948 (by VDNKh weather station only))
Month	Jan	Feb	Mar	Apr	May	Jun	Jul	Aug	Sep	Oct	Nov	Dec	Year
Record high °C (°F)	8.6 (47.5)	8.3 (46.9)	19.7 (67.5)	28.9 (84.0)	33.2 (91.8)	34.8 (94.6)	38.2 (100.8)	37.3 (99.1)	29.4 (84.9)	23.7 (74.7)	16.2 (61.2)	9.6 (49.3)	38.2 (100.8)
Record low °C (°F)	−38.1 (−36.6)	−35.2 (−31.4)	−27.9 (−18.2)	−18.8 (−1.8)	−5.0 (23.0)	0.8 (33.4)	5.1 (41.2)	2.1 (35.8)	−5.2 (22.6)	−16.1 (3.0)	−23.3 (−9.9)	−38.0 (−36.4)	−38.1 (−36.6)

Climate data for Moscow (VDNKh) WMO ID: 27612; coordinates 55°49′53″N 37°37′20″E; elevation: 147 m (482 ft); 1991–2020 normals, extremes 1879–present
Month	Jan	Feb	Mar	Apr	May	Jun	Jul	Aug	Sep	Oct	Nov	Dec	Year
Record high °C (°F)	8.6 (47.5)	8.3 (46.9)	19.7 (67.5)	28.9 (84.0)	33.2 (91.8)	34.8 (94.6)	38.2 (100.8)	37.3 (99.1)	32.3 (90.1)	24.0 (75.2)	16.2 (61.2)	9.6 (49.3)	38.2 (100.8)
Mean maximum °C (°F)	2.8 (37.0)	3.5 (38.3)	10.8 (51.4)	21.7 (71.1)	27.3 (81.1)	29.5 (85.1)	31.0 (87.8)	30.0 (86.0)	24.7 (76.5)	17.9 (64.2)	8.9 (48.0)	4.2 (39.6)	31.9 (89.4)
Mean daily maximum °C (°F)	−3.9 (25.0)	−3 (27)	3.0 (37.4)	11.7 (53.1)	19.0 (66.2)	22.4 (72.3)	24.7 (76.5)	22.7 (72.9)	16.4 (61.5)	8.9 (48.0)	1.6 (34.9)	−2.3 (27.9)	10.1 (50.2)
Daily mean °C (°F)	−6.2 (20.8)	−5.9 (21.4)	−0.7 (30.7)	6.9 (44.4)	13.6 (56.5)	17.3 (63.1)	19.7 (67.5)	17.6 (63.7)	11.9 (53.4)	5.8 (42.4)	−0.5 (31.1)	−4.4 (24.1)	6.3 (43.3)
Mean daily minimum °C (°F)	−8.7 (16.3)	−8.8 (16.2)	−4.2 (24.4)	2.3 (36.1)	8.1 (46.6)	12.2 (54.0)	14.8 (58.6)	13.0 (55.4)	8.0 (46.4)	3.0 (37.4)	−2.4 (27.7)	−6.5 (20.3)	2.6 (36.7)
Mean minimum °C (°F)	−21.1 (−6.0)	−20.9 (−5.6)	−12.8 (9.0)	−5.1 (22.8)	0.3 (32.5)	5.8 (42.4)	9.7 (49.5)	6.8 (44.2)	0.9 (33.6)	−4.6 (23.7)	−11.7 (10.9)	−17.3 (0.9)	−23.9 (−11.0)
Record low °C (°F)	−42.1 (−43.8)	−38.2 (−36.8)	−32.4 (−26.3)	−21 (−6)	−7.5 (18.5)	−2.3 (27.9)	1.3 (34.3)	−1.2 (29.8)	−8.5 (16.7)	−20.3 (−4.5)	−32.8 (−27.0)	−38.8 (−37.8)	−42.1 (−43.8)
Average precipitation mm (inches)	53 (2.1)	44 (1.7)	39 (1.5)	37 (1.5)	61 (2.4)	78 (3.1)	84 (3.3)	78 (3.1)	66 (2.6)	70 (2.8)	52 (2.0)	51 (2.0)	713 (28.1)
Average extreme snow depth cm (inches)	24 (9.4)	35 (14)	29 (11)	2 (0.8)	0 (0)	0 (0)	0 (0)	0 (0)	0 (0)	0 (0)	4 (1.6)	12 (4.7)	35 (14)
Average rainy days	8	6	9	15	16	16	15	16	16	17	13	8	155
Average snowy days	25	23	15	6	1	0	0	0	0.3	5	17	24	116
Average relative humidity (%)	85	81	74	68	67	72	74	78	82	83	86	86	78
Mean monthly sunshine hours	33	72	128	170	265	279	271	238	147	78	32	18	1,731
Mean daily sunshine hours	1.1	2.5	4.1	5.7	8.5	9.3	8.7	7.7	4.9	2.5	1.1	0.6	4.7
Mean daily daylight hours	7.9	9.7	11.9	14.3	16.3	17.4	16.8	14.9	12.7	10.5	8.4	7.2	12.3
Percentage possible sunshine	14	27	35	40	53	53	52	51	38	24	13	8	34
Average ultraviolet index	0	1	2	3	5	6	6	5	3	1	1	0	3
Source 1: Pogoda.ru.net, Thermograph.ru, Meteoweb.ru (sunshine hours)
Source 2: Weather Atlas (UV)

== Climate change ==
According to the VDNKh weather station, the climate has been getting warmer in recent decades, and the average annual temperature has been rising.. The reasons for this process may be both the so—called global warming and the natural cyclical climate, as well as the continued growth of the city (an increase in population, the number of cars, etc. - there are many construction projects in the VDNKH area, new overpasses and interchanges have appeared). At the same time, the latter factor still plays the least importance — warming at VDNKh is proceeding at the same pace as at suburban stations.

Average temperature over the decade:

- 1969—1978 — +4,8 °C
- 1979—1988 — +5,0 °C
- 1989—1998 — +5,7 °C
- 1999—2008 — +6,3 °C
- 2009—2018 — +6,8 °C
- 2019—2028 — +7,3 °C
- 2029—2038 — +7,8 °C
- 2039—2048 — +8,3 °C
- 2049—2058 — +8,8 °C
- 2059—2068 — +9,3 °C
- 2069—2078 — +9,8 °C
- 2079—2088 — +10,3 °C
- 2089—2098 — +10,8 °C

The warming is uneven throughout the year, for example, December and January have warmed significantly in winter, the temperature in February has increased slightly; in spring, the temperature in March and April has increased, and the temperature in May has decreased slightly.

In summer, warming is observed in July and August, the temperature in June decreased slightly. In autumn, warming occurs in all months, the most in November .In November 2005, in 2006, 2008, 2009, 2010, 2011, 2012 In recent years, the average monthly temperature has been above 0. As a result, over the past 10 years (2003-2012), the average temperature in November has turned positive, reaching +0.9, which was previously unusual for this month. In the Moscow region, November traditionally refers to the cold season.

=== Le taux 1991-2020 ===
Since 2021, the norms of the 1991-2020 series, calculated according to the data of the VDNKh meteorological station, can be used to characterize the modern climate of Moscow. The World Meteorological Organization has decided that it is necessary to calculate two climatic standards: the climatological standard and the reference. The climatological standard norm is updated every ten years, the reference norm covers the period from 1961 to 1990.

== Criticism ==
=== Lowering the maximum temperature ===
Many professional meteorologists criticize the location of the station. In particular, the site does not meet the requirements of the guidance documents on the location of the weather station, according to which the meteorological site should be removed from buildings and trees by at least 10 times their height.: The weather booth is shaded by tall trees growing about 30 m from the site.. This contributes to the fact that in sunny weather during the period from mid—October to early March (when the sun is lowest above the horizon), the station's temperature readings in sunny weather are seriously underestimated (by 1-2 degrees compared to other Moscow stations).

=== Measuring wind speed and recording weather events ===
Due to the location of the weather station among dense buildings, it has significantly reduced wind speed and the frequency of snowstorms (compared to weather stations located on the outskirts of the city). There are no night-time landmarks to determine visibility, as a result, visibility observations are not performed at night..

=== Snow cover ===
In recent years, the problem of recording more snow cover than the surrounding metropolitan and regional weather stations has become significant. The fact is that the weather station is located in a kind of hollow — there is a forest belt on the south side, which is also located on an elevation relative to the site. Also, given that the weather station is located in a dense urban area in the wind shadow, such conditions contribute to the accumulation of snow cover by the end of the meteorological winter, and a significant discrepancy in its measured height from the actual height of snow cover in the city, including in open areas, even those not affected by anthropogenic influences.

All these violations make the site unsuitable for conducting objective meteorological observations in the metropolis..

=== Technical errors in observations ===
Observation errors are also common. An example of a gross error is the value that records the minimum temperature at night from June 30 to July 1, 2010, when, according to data transmitted from the station, the temperature was +1.2 °C. This value is below the historical minimum of July. This data has been transferred to an international exchange and is not subject to correction.

On November 10, 2011, observers made a typo when transmitting encoded data, as a result of which distorted data was received in the international exchange, namely information that the snow cover in Moscow reaches almost 1 meter (97 cm), despite the fact that there was no actual snow cover.

== See also ==
- Climate of Moscow
- Weather station
