= Golubkovo =

Golubkovo Голубково
- Village
- Location within Vologda Oblast Location within Russia
- Coordinates: 59°07′N 39°52′E
- Country: Russia
- Region: Vologda Oblast
- District: Vologodsky District
- Time zone: UTC+3:00

Golubkovo (Russian: Голубково) is a rural locality (a village) in Spasskoye Rural Settlement, Vologodsky District, Vologda Oblast, Russia. The population was 20 as of 2002.

== Geography ==
Golubkovo is located 12 km south of Vologda (the district's administrative centre) by road. Spasskoye is the nearest rural locality.
