= Karacharovo =

Karacharovo Карачарово
- Selo
- Location within Vladimir Oblast Location within Russia
- Coordinates: 56°05′N 40°00′E
- Country: Russia
- Region: Vladimir Oblast
- District: Sobinsky District
- Time zone: UTC+3:00

Karacharovo (Russian: Карачарово) is a rural locality (a selo) in Kurilovskoye Rural Settlement, Sobinsky District, Vladimir Oblast, Russia. The population was 31 as of 2010.

== Geography ==
Karacharovo is located 16 km north of Sobinka (the district's administrative centre) by road. Bakino is the nearest rural locality.
