= Krasnozavodsk =

Town in Moscow Oblast, Russia

Krasnozavodsk Краснозаводск
- Town
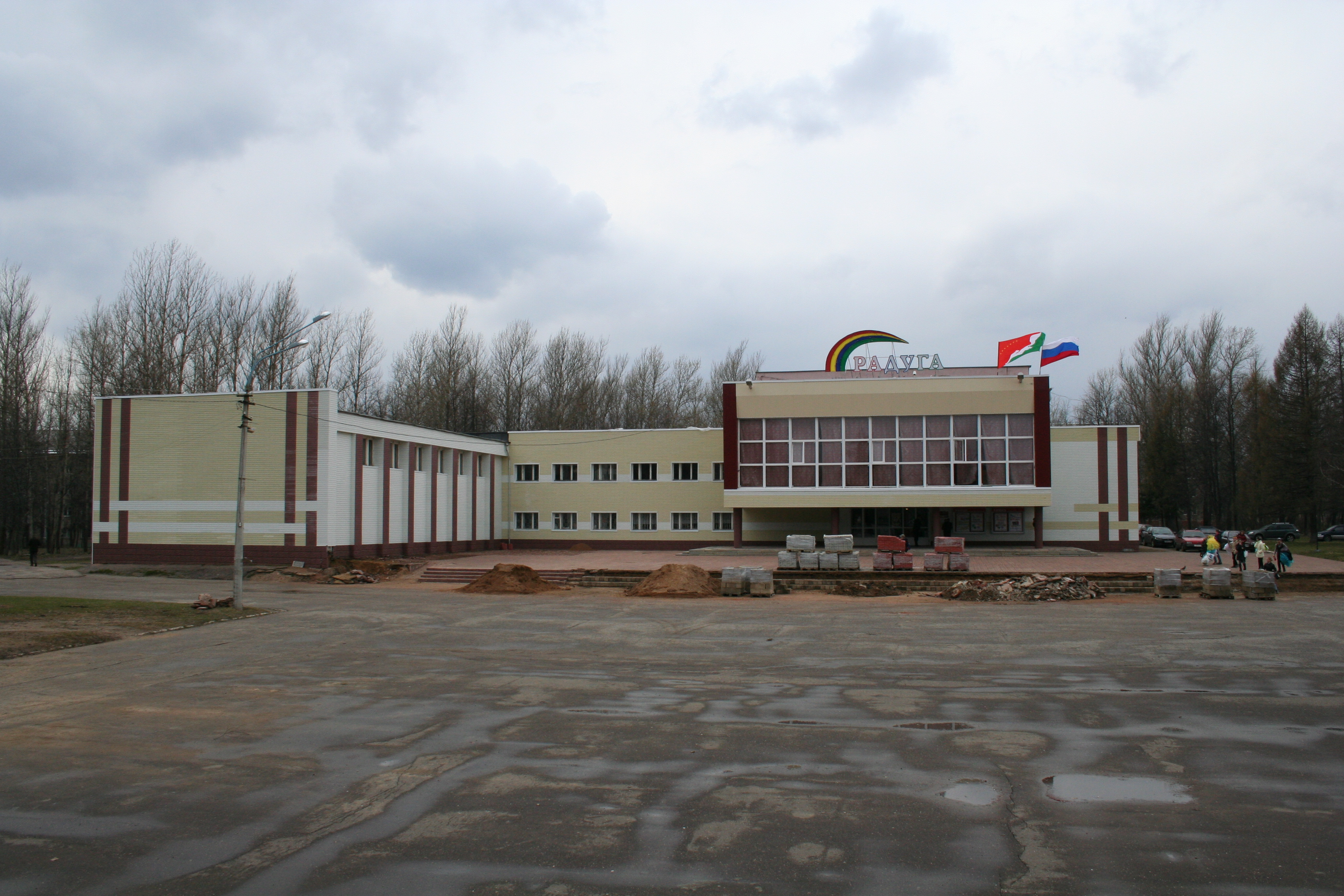
- House of Culture in Krasnozavodsk

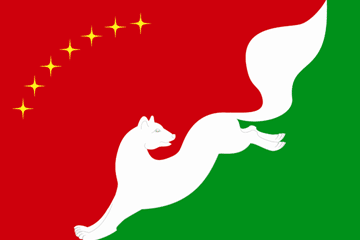
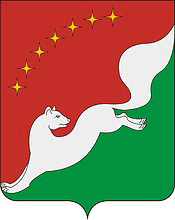
- Flag Coat of arms
- Interactive map of Krasnozavodsk
- Location of Krasnozavodsk Krasnozavodsk (Moscow Oblast)
- Coordinates: 56°26′N 38°14′E
- Country: Russia
- Federal subject: Moscow Oblast
- Administrative district: Sergiyevo-Posadsky District
- TownSelsoviet: Krasnozavodsk
- Founded: 1915
- Town status since: 1940
- Elevation: 220 m (720 ft)

Population (2010 Census)
  - Total: 13,392
  - Estimate (2025): 14,321 (+6.9%)

Administrative status
  - Capital of: Town of Krasnozavodsk

Municipal status
  - Municipal district: Sergiyevo-Posadsky Municipal District
  - Urban settlement: Krasnozavodsk Urban Settlement
  - Capital of: Krasnozavodsk Urban Settlement
- Time zone: UTC+3 (MSK)
- Postal code: 141321
- OKTMO ID: 46728000006
- Website: krasnozavodsk.info

Krasnozavodsk (Russian: Краснозаво́дск; lit. "red factory") is a town in Sergiyevo-Posadsky District of Moscow Oblast, Russia, located on the Kunya River (Dubna's tributary) 88 kilometers (55 mi) northeast of Moscow and 15 kilometers (9.3 mi) north of Sergiyev Posad, the administrative center of the district. Population: 13,392 (2010 census); 13,549 (2002 census); 29,786 (1989 Soviet census).

== History ==
It was founded in 1915 as a settlement servicing a mechanical factory and initially had no name. After 1917, it was called Vozrozhdeniye (Возрожде́ние, lit. revival), Zagorsky (Заго́рский), due to its vicinity to Zagorsk (now Sergiyev Posad); and Krasnozavodsky (Краснозаво́дский). In 1940, it was granted town status and given its present name. On December 8, 1999, a part of Krasnozavodsk containing the research institute and the nearby settlement of Novostroyka were incorporated into the new town of Peresvet. The process was finalized on March 28, 2000.

== Administrative and municipal status ==
Within the framework of administrative divisions, it is, together with two rural localities, incorporated within Sergiyevo-Posadsky District as the Town of Krasnozavodsk. As a municipal division, the Town of Krasnozavodsk is incorporated within Sergiyevo-Posadsky Municipal District as Krasnozavodsk Urban Settlement.
