= List of European tornadoes in 2012 =

This is a list of all tornadoes that were confirmed throughout Europe by the European Severe Storms Laboratory and local meteorological agencies during 2012. Unlike the United States, the original Fujita Scale and the TORRO scale are used to rank tornadoes across the continent.

== European yearly total ==
Tornadoes by Country
Country	Total	F?	F0	F1	F2	F3	F4	F5
Austria	2	0	0	1	1	0	0	0
Belarus	2	2	0	0	0	0	0	0
Belgium	3	2	0	1	0	0	0	0
Bosnia	1	0	0	1	0	0	0	0
Bulgaria	2	2	0	0	0	0	0	0
Croatia	3	3	0	0	0	0	0	0
Cyprus	3	2	1	0	0	0	0	0
Czech Republic	1	0	0	1	0	0	0	0
Denmark	4	4	0	0	0	0	0	0
France	19	1	9	9	0	0	0	0
Georgia	1	1	0	0	0	0	0	0
Germany	20	8	2	8	2	0	0	0
Greece	9	3	0	3	3	0	0	0
Hungary	1	0	0	1	0	0	0	0
Ireland	2	2	0	0	0	0	0	0
Italy	26	9	9	3	4	1	0	0
Lithuania	1	0	0	1	0	0	0	0
Malta	2	1	1	0	0	0	0	0
Moldova	1	1	0	0	0	0	0	0
Netherlands	9	5	3	1	0	0	0	0
Poland	9	3	1	3	0	2	0	0
Portugal	4	2	0	1	0	1	0	0
Romania	2	1	0	1	0	0	0	0
Russia	24	19	0	4	1	0	0	0
Serbia	1	1	0	0	0	0	0	0
Slovenia	1	0	1	0	0	0	0	0
Spain	7	6	0	1	0	0	0	0
Sweden	9	7	1	1	0	0	0	0
Turkey	32	18	5	7	2	0	0	0
Ukraine	6	3	0	1	2	0	0	0
United Kingdom	7	6	0	1	1	0	0	0
Totals	215	112	33	50	16	4	0	0

== January ==
=== January 3 event ===
List of reported tornadoes - Tuesday, January 3, 2012
F#	T#	Location	District/ County	Coord.	Time (UTC)	Path length	Comments/Damage
United Kingdom
F?	T?	Portsmouth	Hampshire	50.79°N 1.09°W	1200	Unknown	60 mph winds rip through the town, uprooting trees
F?	T?	Hainault	Greater London	51.61°N 0.10°E	1418	Unknown	Trees uprooted, roofs damaged
F?	T?	Clacton-on-Sea	Essex	51.79°N 1.16°E	1457	Unknown	Trees uprooted, streets flooded
Sources: ESSL Severe Weather Database

=== January 6 event ===
List of reported tornadoes - Friday, January 6, 2012
F#	T#	Location	District/ County	Coord.	Time (UTC)	Path length	Comments/Damage
Greece
F?	T?	Amaliás	West Greece	37.80°N 21.35°E	1000	Unknown	Several homes sustained roof damage and trees were uprooted.
Sources: ESSL Severe Weather Database

=== January 7 event ===
List of reported tornadoes - Saturday, January 7, 2012
F#	T#	Location	District/ County	Coord.	Time (UTC)	Path length	Comments/Damage
Turkey
F?	T?	Beykonak	Antalya	36.31°N 30.31°E	0000	Unknown	Tornado damaged greenhouses and power lines
F0	T?	Gazipaşa	Antalya	36.25°N 32.30°E	0300	Unknown	Waterspout moved onshore and damaged a greenhouse
F1	T?	Dumanlar	Antalya	36.98°N 30.87°E	1700	3 kilometres (1.9 mi)	Significant tornado destroyed greenhouses and devastated farmland
Sources: ESSL Severe Weather Database

=== January 8 event ===
List of reported tornadoes - Sunday, January 8, 2012
F#	T#	Location	District/ County	Coord.	Time (UTC)	Path length	Comments/Damage
Turkey
F0	T1	Anamur	Mersin	36.08°N 32.85°E	0600	Unknown	Tornado damaged a greenhouse
Sources: ESSL Severe Weather Database

=== January 20 event ===
List of reported tornadoes - Friday, January 20, 2012
F#	T#	Location	District/ County	Coord.	Time (UTC)	Path length	Comments/Damage
Belgium
F1	T2	Veldwezelt	Limburg	50.87°N 5.63°E	0030	Unknown	
Sources: ESSL Severe Weather Database Windhoos richt schade aan

=== January 27 event ===
List of reported tornadoes - Friday, January 27, 2012
F#	T#	Location	District/ County	Coord.	Time (UTC)	Path length	Comments/Damage
Turkey
F1	T2	Torokent	Mersin	36.04°N 32.83°E	0400	Unknown	A waterspout moved onshore and damaged greenhouses
Sources: ESSL Severe Weather Database Windhoos richt schade aan

=== January 31 event ===
List of reported tornadoes - Tuesday, January 31, 2012
F#	T#	Location	District/ County	Coord.	Time (UTC)	Path length	Comments/Damage
Turkey
F?	T?	Karadeniz Ereğli	Zonguldak	41.29°N 31.42°E	1200	Unknown	Waterspout sank a ship before moving onshore; however, this may have been a gustnado
Sources: ESSL Severe Weather Database Windhoos richt schade aan

== February ==
=== February 2 event ===
List of reported tornadoes - Thursday, February 2, 2012
F#	T#	Location	District/ County	Coord.	Time (UTC)	Path length	Comments/Damage
Turkey
F?	T?	Kurtuluş	Mersin	36.33°N 33.99°E	0600	Unknown	Greenhouses were damaged
Sources: ESSL Severe Weather Database

=== February 4 event ===
List of reported tornadoes - Saturday, February 4, 2012
F#	T#	Location	District/ County	Coord.	Time (UTC)	Path length	Comments/Damage
Italy
F2	T?	Diso	Apulia	40.01°N 18.39°E	0300	6 kilometres (3.7 mi)	Strong tornado damaged many homes. Losses from the storm reached €5 million
Sources: ESSL Severe Weather Database

=== February 15 event ===
List of reported tornadoes - Wednesday, February 15, 2012
F#	T#	Location	District/ County	Coord.	Time (UTC)	Path length	Comments/Damage
Turkey
F?	T?	Beykonak	Antalya	36.31°N 30.33°E	0000	Unknown	Tornado damaged greenhouses and farmland
Sources: ESSL Severe Weather Database

=== February 27 event ===
List of reported tornadoes - Monday, February 27, 2012
F#	T#	Location	District/ County	Coord.	Time (UTC)	Path length	Comments/Damage
Turkey
F0	T1	Yeşilöz	Alanya	36.39°N 32.19°E	1100	Unknown	Formed as a waterspout over sea, moved onshore, damaging greenhouses and farmland
Sources: ESSL Severe Weather Database

=== February 28 event ===
List of reported tornadoes - Tuesday, February 28, 2012
F#	T#	Location	District/ County	Coord.	Time (UTC)	Path length	Comments/Damage
Cyprus
F?	T?	Mormenekşe	Famagusta	35.20°N 33.86°E	0900	Unknown	Roofs blown away and smashed, walls downed and power poles broken
Sources: ESSL Severe Weather Database

== March ==
=== March 10 event ===
List of reported tornadoes - Saturday, March 10, 2012
F#	T#	Location	District/ County	Coord.	Time (UTC)	Path length	Comments/Damage
Italy
F1	T?	Marina Di Modica	Sicily	36.72°N 14.79°E	1200	Unknown	Several homes were damaged and trees were uprooted
F?	T?	Lido di Plaia	Sicily	37.46°N 15.11°E	1300	Unknown	Waterspout briefly moved onshore
Sources: ESSL Severe Weather Database

=== March 12 event ===
List of reported tornadoes - Monday, March 12, 2012
F#	T#	Location	District/ County	Coord.	Time (UTC)	Path length	Comments/Damage
Cyprus
F0	T1	Aydınköy	Nicosia	35.17°N 32.94°E	1700	Unknown	Weak tornado damaged farm equipment
Sources: ESSL Severe Weather Database

=== March 14 event ===
List of reported tornadoes - Wednesday, March 14, 2012
F#	T#	Location	District/ County	Coord.	Time (UTC)	Path length	Comments/Damage
Turkey
F1	T?	Akdam	Antalya	36.63°N 31.80°E	0930	Unknown	Tornado struck Akdam and destroyed several greenhouses. A few other homes had windows blown out and 10 hectares of farmland was damaged.
Sources: ESSL Severe Weather Database

=== March 26 event ===
List of reported tornadoes - Monday, March 26, 2012
F#	T#	Location	District/ County	Coord.	Time (UTC)	Path length	Comments/Damage
Turkey
F?	T?	Antalya	Antalya	36.90°N 30.66°E	1230	Unknown	1 death – A tornado reportedly struck Antalya and killed one person.
Sources: ESSL Severe Weather Database

== April ==
=== April 8 event ===
List of reported tornadoes - Sunday, 8 April 2012
F#	T#	Location	District/ County	Coord.	Time (UTC)	Path length	Comments/Damage
Italy
F2	T?	Gallignano	Lombardia	45.44°N 9.84°E	1300	3.1 kilometres (1.9 mi)	Tornado struck Gallignano and damaged houses
Sources: ESSL Severe Weather Database

=== April 9 event ===
List of reported tornadoes - Monday, 9 April 2012
F#	T#	Location	District/ County	Coord.	Time (UTC)	Path length	Comments/Damage
Turkey
F2	T5	Dutpınar	Elazığ	38.43°N 39.63°E	1530	11 kilometres (6.8 mi)	6 deaths – Tornado moved through a construction site near Maden, killing 6 people.
Sources: ESSL Severe Weather Database

=== April 10 event ===
List of reported tornadoes - Tuesday, 10 April 2012
F#	T#	Location	District/ County	Coord.	Time (UTC)	Path length	Comments/Damage
Turkey
F1	T?	Bilginler	Antalya	37.00°N 31.10°E	0730	6 kilometres (3.7 mi)	A southwestward moving tornado damaged houses in the Bilginler area
Sources: ESSL Severe Weather Database

=== April 11 event ===
List of reported tornadoes - Wednesday, 11 April 2012
F#	T#	Location	District/ County	Coord.	Time (UTC)	Path length	Comments/Damage
Turkey
F?	T?	Taşucu	Mersin	36.33°N 33.89°E	0700	Unknown	Seven tents were destroyed
Italy
F?	T?	La Spezia	Liguria	44.11°N 9.84°E	0800	Unknown	Tornado struck the port of La Spezia, damaging several containers and injuring one person.
Sources: ESSL Severe Weather Database

=== April 15 event ===
List of reported tornadoes - Sunday, 15 April 2012
F#	T#	Location	District/ County	Coord.	Time (UTC)	Path length	Comments/Damage
Spain
F?	T?	Villargordo	Andalucía	37.39°N 3.72°W	1500	Unknown	Tornado reported near Villargordo
Sources: ESSL Severe Weather Database

=== April 17 event ===
List of reported tornadoes - Tuesday, 17 April 2012
F#	T#	Location	District/ County	Coord.	Time (UTC)	Path length	Comments/Damage
Moldova
F?	T?	Băcioi	Chişinău	46.91°N 28.88°W	1330	Unknown	Tornado reported in Băcioi. Funnel cloud recorded on video
Sources: ESSL Severe Weather Database

=== April 18 event ===
List of reported tornadoes - Wednesday, 18 April 2012
F#	T#	Location	District/ County	Coord.	Time (UTC)	Path length	Comments/Damage
Turkey
F1	T?	S of Ceyhan	Adana	36.98°N 35.82°E	1800	Unknown	
Sources: ESSL Severe Weather Database

=== April 20 event ===
List of reported tornadoes - Friday, 20 April 2012
F#	T#	Location	District/ County	Coord.	Time (UTC)	Path length	Comments/Damage
Netherlands
F?	T?	Koningsbosch	Limburg	51.05°N 5.96°E	1630	Unknown	Likely tornado
Sources: ESSL Severe Weather Database

=== April 22 event ===
List of reported tornadoes - Sunday, 22 April 2012
F#	T#	Location	District/ County	Coord.	Time (UTC)	Path length	Comments/Damage
United Kingdom
F?	T?	Lyndhurst	Hampshire	50.87°N 1.61°W	1500	Unknown	Brief touchdown
Sources: ESSL Severe Weather Database

=== April 24 event ===
List of reported tornadoes - Tuesday, 24 April 2012
F#	T#	Location	District/ County	Coord.	Time (UTC)	Path length	Comments/Damage
United Kingdom
F2	T?	Gosfield	Essex	51.95°N 0.61°E	1637	1.4 kilometres (0.87 mi)	Narrow tornado caused extensive damage along a 1.4 km (0.87 mi) path. Several barns were destroyed and many structures were damaged. Numerous trees were snapped or uprooted as well.
Sources: ESSL Severe Weather Database

=== April 25 event ===
List of reported tornadoes - Wednesday, 25 April 2012
F#	T#	Location	District/ County	Coord.	Time (UTC)	Path length	Comments/Damage
United Kingdom
F1	T?	Halstead	Essex	51.95°N 0.61°E	1545	1.4 kilometres (0.87 mi)	barn overthrown. houses damaged
Sources: ESSL Severe Weather Database

=== April 29 event ===
List of reported tornadoes - Sunday, 29 April 2012
F#	T#	Location	District/ County	Coord.	Time (UTC)	Path length	Comments/Damage
France
F1	T3	SW of Seysses	Haute-Garonne	43.51°N 1.26°E	1600	3.3 kilometres (2.1 mi)	Tornado caused extensive damage in communities near Seysses. Several barns sustained severe damage and many homes lost part of their roofs. Numerous trees were also snapped or uprooted.
Sources: ESSL Severe Weather Database

== May ==
=== May 2 event ===
List of reported tornadoes - Wednesday, 2 May 2012
F#	T#	Location	District/ County	Coord.	Time (UTC)	Path length	Comments/Damage
Portugal
F1	T?	Lagoa de Albufeira	Sesimbra	38.50°N 9.17°W	1050	1 kilometre (0.62 mi)	Likely tornado snapped dozens of trees and damaged several homes. One person was injured
Sources: ESSL Severe Weather Database

=== May 3 event ===
List of reported tornadoes - Thursday, 3 May 2012
F#	T#	Location	District/ County	Coord.	Time (UTC)	Path length	Comments/Damage
Turkey
F?	T?	Afşin	Kahramanmaraş	38.37°N 37.03°E	1300	Unknown	Fifteen homes lost their roofs
Sources: ESSL Severe Weather Database

=== May 6 event ===
List of reported tornadoes - Sunday, 6 May 2012
F#	T#	Location	District/ County	Coord.	Time (UTC)	Path length	Comments/Damage
Germany
F?	T?	Musberg	Baden-Württemberg	48.69°N 9.12°E	1305	Unknown	Possible tornado; vortex may not have reached the ground.
Romania
F?	T?	Traian	Brăila	45.17°N 27.80°E	1515	Unknown	May have been a gustnado
Italy
F?	T?	Santhià	Piedmont	45.37°N 8.17°E	1715	Unknown	Confirmed tornado
Sources: ESSL Severe Weather Database

=== May 9 event ===
List of reported tornadoes - Wednesday, 9 May 2012
F#	T#	Location	District/ County	Coord.	Time (UTC)	Path length	Comments/Damage
Germany
F?	T?	Pulheim	Nordrhein-Westfalen	51.00°N 6.80°E	1605	Unknown	Possible tornado
Sources: ESSL Severe Weather Database

=== May 10 event ===
List of reported tornadoes - Thursday, 10 May 2012
F#	T#	Location	District/ County	Coord.	Time (UTC)	Path length	Comments/Damage
Belgium
F?	T?	WNW of Zaffelare	East Flanders	51.14°N 3.84°E	1615	6.5 kilometres (4.0 mi)	Tornado touched down near Zaffelare, causing damage to a barn and fencing.
Netherlands
F0	T1	Vierlingsbeek	North Brabant	51.57°N 5.86°E	1825	11 kilometres (6.8 mi)	Tornado downed trees and roofs with borderline T2 (F1) damage in some areas.
Sources: ESSL Severe Weather Database

=== May 15 event ===
List of reported tornadoes - Tuesday, 15 May 2012
F#	T#	Location	District/ County	Coord.	Time (UTC)	Path length	Comments/Damage
Germany
F?	T?	Ortenberg	Hesse	50.35°N 9.05°E	1430	Unknown	Possible brief touchdown
Sources: ESSL Severe Weather Database

=== May 16 event ===
List of reported tornadoes - Wednesday, 16 May 2012
F#	T#	Location	District/ County	Coord.	Time (UTC)	Path length	Comments/Damage
Ukraine
F?	T?	Khortytsia Island	Zaporizhzhia	47.84°N 35.06°E	1430	Unknown	Tornado damaged roofs
Sources: ESSL Severe Weather Database

=== May 17 event ===
List of reported tornadoes - Thursday, 17 May 2012
F#	T#	Location	District/ County	Coord.	Time (UTC)	Path length	Comments/Damage
Bulgaria
F?	T?	Stara Zagora	Stara Zagora	42.55°N 25.60°E	1330	Unknown	Weak tornado remained over mostly open country for approximately 30 minutes, lifting and touching down several times.
Sources: ESSL Severe Weather Database

=== May 19 event ===
List of reported tornadoes - Saturday, 19 May 2012
F#	T#	Location	District/ County	Coord.	Time (UTC)	Path length	Comments/Damage
Turkey
F0	T1	Liman Mahallesi	Antalya	36.83°N 30.62°E	0900	Unknown	A waterspout moved onshore and damaged a few traffic signs and properties
F?	T?	Altıngedik	Kars	40.05°N 43.05°E	1700	Unknown	
Sources: ESSL Severe Weather Database

=== May 21 event ===
List of reported tornadoes - Monday, 21 May 2012
F#	T#	Location	District/ County	Coord.	Time (UTC)	Path length	Comments/Damage
Russia
F?	T?	Vladikavkaz	North Ossetia–Alania	43.05°N 44.61°E	1300	Unknown	Weak tornado
Sources: ESSL Severe Weather Database

=== May 24 event ===
List of reported tornadoes - Thursday, 24 May 2012
F#	T#	Location	District/ County	Coord.	Time (UTC)	Path length	Comments/Damage
Serbia
F?	T?	Novi Beograd	Belgrade	44.81°N 20.42°E	1500	Unknown	
Bosnia and Herzegovina
F1	T?	Ćukovi	Bihać	44.63°N 16.08°E	1530	16 kilometres (9.9 mi)	Tornado damaged several roofs and greenhouses
Sources: ESSL Severe Weather Database

=== May 26 event ===
List of reported tornadoes - Saturday, 26 May 2012
F#	T#	Location	District/ County	Coord.	Time (UTC)	Path length	Comments/Damage
Turkey
F?	T?	Dikenli	Malatya	38.68°N 37.92°E	1000	Unknown	Some homes sustained roof damage and trees were downed
Sources: ESSL Severe Weather Database

=== May 27 event ===
List of reported tornadoes - Sunday, 27 May 2012
F#	T#	Location	District/ County	Coord.	Time (UTC)	Path length	Comments/Damage
Bulgaria
F?	T?	NE of Sofia	Sofia	42.71°N 23.36°E	1400	Unknown	Brief tornado occurred on the outskirts on Sofia
Sources: ESSL Severe Weather Database

=== May 31 event ===
List of reported tornadoes - Thursday, 31 May 2012
F#	T#	Location	District/ County	Coord.	Time (UTC)	Path length	Comments/Damage
Germany
F2	T4	Brilon	North Rhine-Westphalia	52.54°N 8.94°E	1242	4.9 kilometres (3.0 mi)	Multiple-vortex tornado with significant damage
F1	T3	Heidhausen	North Rhine-Westphalia	52.54°N 9.17°E	1252	3.5 kilometres (2.2 mi)	Trees and farm material damaged
Sources: ESSL Severe Weather Database

== June ==
=== June 1 event ===
List of reported tornadoes - Friday, 1 June 2012
F#	T#	Location	District/ County	Coord.	Time (UTC)	Path length	Comments/Damage
Russia
F?	T?	Прогресс	Krasnodar	45.17°N 36.85°E	0704	Unknown	First of two tornadoes in the Taman region. Power lines were damaged near Прогресс (Progress) village.
F?	T?	Artyushchenko	Krasnodar	45.10°N 36.82°E	0704	Unknown	Second of two tornadoes in the Taman region
Hungary
F1	T3	Nyíracsád	Hajdú-Bihar	47.60°N 21.98°E	1305	Unknown	Preliminary rating of F1/T3; may have been slightly stronger (F2/T4)
Romania
F1	T?	Coroieni	Maramureș	47.37°N 23.77°E	1630	6 kilometres (3.7 mi)	Tornado removed or damaged roofs of several homes and snapped or uprooted about 50 trees.
Sources: ESSL Severe Weather Database

=== June 3 event ===
List of reported tornadoes - Sunday, 3 June 2012
F#	T#	Location	District/ County	Coord.	Time (UTC)	Path length	Comments/Damage
Ukraine
F1	T?	W of Luhansk	Luhansk	48.58°N 39.22°E	1230	6 kilometres (3.7 mi)	Tornado touched down west of Luhansk and damaged several homes and many trees. Two people were injured by the storm.
Sources: ESSL Severe Weather Database

=== June 4 event ===
List of reported tornadoes - Monday, 4 June 2012
F#	T#	Location	District/ County	Coord.	Time (UTC)	Path length	Comments/Damage
Ukraine
F2	T?	Yevminka	Chernihiv	50.85°N 30.83°E	1430	Unknown	Strong tornado damaged 96 homes, some severely, and approximately 50 hectares of forest.
F2	T5	Syrai	Chernihiv	50.85°N 31.05°E	1456	Unknown	Strong tornado severely damaged several houses; may have been stronger (F3/T6).
Sources: ESSL Severe Weather Database

=== June 5 event ===
List of reported tornadoes - Tuesday, 5 June 2012
F#	T#	Location	District/ County	Coord.	Time (UTC)	Path length	Comments/Damage
Poland
F?	T?	Kłobuck	Silesian	50.90°N 18.93°E	1405	Unknown	Weak rope tornado
Sources: ESSL Severe Weather Database

=== June 6 event ===
List of reported tornadoes - Wednesday, 6 June 2012
F#	T#	Location	District/ County	Coord.	Time (UTC)	Path length	Comments/Damage
Ukraine
F?	T?	Avengard	Odesa	46.47°N 30.60°E	1500	Unknown	
Sources: ESSL Severe Weather Database

=== June 7 event ===
List of reported tornadoes - Thursday, 7 June 2012
F#	T#	Location	District/ County	Coord.	Time (UTC)	Path length	Comments/Damage
Russia
F?	T?	Belaya Kholunitsa	Kirovskaya	58.84°N 50.85°E	1400	Unknown	
F?	T?	Ryazan	Ryazan	54.62°N 39.74°E	1830	Unknown	
France
F?	T?	Colombey-les-Belles	Meurthe-et-Moselle	48.53°N 5.90°E	1430	0.3 kilometres (0.19 mi)	Brief tornado with damage limited to trees
F0	T1	Silly-sur-Nied	Moselle	49.12°N 6.37°E	1515	6 kilometres (3.7 mi)	Damage limited to trees
Belgium
F?	T?	Tongeren	Limburg	50.84°N 5.47°E	1730	9 kilometres (5.6 mi)	Damage unknown
Netherlands
F?	T?	Montfort	Limburg	51.13°N 5.95°E	1800	Unknown	Several homes sustained roof damage
Germany
F1	T2	Grefrath	Nordrhein-Westfalen	51.34°N 6.34°E	1915	2.2 kilometres (1.4 mi)	Tornado damaged several homes and trees
Sources: ESSL Severe Weather Database

=== June 8 event ===
List of reported tornadoes - Friday, 8 June 2012
F#	T#	Location	District/ County	Coord.	Time (UTC)	Path length	Comments/Damage
Russia
F?	T?	Gavrilov-Jam	Yaroslavl	57.29°N 39.91°E	1200	Unknown	
F?	T?	Stavropol	Stavropol	45.04°N 41.97°E	1300	Unknown	
Netherlands
F?	T?	Emmer-Compascuum	Drenthe	52.81°N 7.05°E	1650	Unknown	
Sources: ESSL Severe Weather Database

=== June 9 event ===
List of reported tornadoes - Saturday, 9 June 2012
F#	T#	Location	District/ County	Coord.	Time (UTC)	Path length	Comments/Damage
Belarus
F?	T?	Hrodna	Grodno Region	53.68°N 23.82°E	1345	Unknown	Tornado damaged several cars
Sources: ESSL Severe Weather Database

=== June 10 event ===
List of reported tornadoes - Sunday, 10 June 2012
F#	T#	Location	District/ County	Coord.	Time (UTC)	Path length	Comments/Damage
Russia
F?	T?	Listvyanka	Ryazan	54.49°N 39.97°E	1400	Unknown	Tornado observed near a river before being obscured by vegetation
Poland
F1	T3	Szczecno	Świętokrzyskie	50.80°N 20.77°E	1600	11.5 kilometres (7.1 mi)	Tornado tore the roof off two buildings. Numerous trees and power lines also downed
Sources: ESSL Severe Weather Database

=== June 11 event ===
List of reported tornadoes - Monday, 11 June 2012
F#	T#	Location	District/ County	Coord.	Time (UTC)	Path length	Comments/Damage
Lithuania
F1	T?	Čedasai	Panevėžys	56.10°N 25.42°E	0500	Unknown	Several greenhouses and homes were damaged. One greenhouse was lofted into the air and destroyed on impact
Ireland
F?	T?	ENE of Buncrana	Donegal	55.20°N 7.29°W	0930	Unknown	Brief rope tornado touched down
Russia
F?	T?	Shadrinsk	Kurgan	56.08°N 63.64°E	1100	Unknown	
F?	T?	Tovarkovo	Kaluga	54.70°N 35.94°E	1600	Unknown	
F?	T?	Selezni	Smolensk	55.65°N 31.48°E	2300	Unknown	
Poland
F?	T?	Sulechów	Lubusz	52.08°N 15.61°E	1100	Unknown	
France
F1	T2	Le Lardin-Saint-Lazare	Dordogne	45.13°N 1.21°E	1730	1.8 kilometres (1.1 mi)	
Italy
F?	T?	Mortara	Lombardy	45.25°N 8.74°E	1800	Unknown	Tornado touched down over an open field
Sources: ESSL Severe Weather Database

=== June 12 event ===
List of reported tornadoes - Tuesday, 12 June 2012
F#	T#	Location	District/ County	Coord.	Time (UTC)	Path length	Comments/Damage
Russia
F?	T?	Chanty-Mansiysk	Taymyr	61.05°N 69.02°E	0400	Unknown	
F2	T?	Ryabeyevo	Tver	56.83°N 35.69°E	1200	Unknown	Numerous trees were snapped or uprooted over a large area. Damage indicative of a strong F2 tornado.
Italy
F2	T?	SE of Venice	Veneto	45.43°N 12.36°E	0911	10.5 kilometres (6.5 mi)	Tornado touched down southeast of Venice and damaged several trees and homes
France
F0	T?	Versigny	Picardy	45.43°N 12.36°E	1400	Unknown	Brief tornado
Ukraine
F?	T?	Krylos	Ivano-Frankivsk	49.08°N 24.70°E	1600	4 kilometres (2.5 mi)	Forty homes were damaged, some severely, and many trees were snapped or uprooted.
Germany
F?	T?	Oberhausen	North Rhine-Westphalia	51.78°N 9.30°E	1722	Unknown	
Ireland
F?	T?	Enfield	County Meath	53.32°N 6.92°W	1910	Unknown	Brief touchdown
Sources: ESSL Severe Weather Database

=== June 15 event ===
List of reported tornadoes - Saturday, 15 June 2012
F#	T#	Location	District/ County	Coord.	Time (UTC)	Path length	Comments/Damage
Russia
F?	T?	Aleksin-Petrovskiy	Tul'skaya oblast	54.50°N 36.98°E	1500	unknown	Tornado hit the western part of Aleksin, causing some damage.
Sources: ESSL Severe Weather Database

=== June 17 event ===
List of reported tornadoes - Sunday, 17 June 2012
F#	T#	Location	District/ County	Coord.	Time (UTC)	Path length	Comments/Damage
Russia
F?	T?	Tyrka	Irkutskaya oblast	54.51°N 107.12°E	0830	unknown	
Sources: ESSL Severe Weather Database

=== June 21 event ===
List of reported tornadoes - Thursday, 17 June 2012
F#	T#	Location	District/ County	Coord.	Time (UTC)	Path length	Comments/Damage
France
F1	T3	Isbergues	Nord-Pas-de-Calais	50.63°N 2.44°E	1510	2.8 kilometres (1.7 mi)	
F1	T3	Hermonville	Champagne-Ardenne	49.33°N 3.90°E	1510	6.5 kilometres (4.0 mi)	
Netherlands
F?	T?	Aalsmeer	North Holland	52.26°N 4.73°E	1510	unknown	Roofs were torn, greenhouse windows were destroyed, and trees were downed.
Sources: ESSL Severe Weather Database

=== June 24 event ===
List of reported tornadoes - Sunday, 24 June 2012
F#	T#	Location	District/ County	Coord.	Time (UTC)	Path length	Comments/Damage
Germany
F1	T3	Ochtmannien	Niedersachsen	52.83°N 8.91°E	1812	1.8 kilometres (1.1 mi)	
Sources: ESSL Severe Weather Database

=== June 28 event ===
List of reported tornadoes - Thursday, 28 June 2012
F#	T#	Location	District/ County	Coord.	Time (UTC)	Path length	Comments/Damage
United Kingdom
F?	T?	Swarby	England	53.01°N 0.36°E	1345	unknown	Houses and trees were damaged.
Sources: ESSL Severe Weather Database

=== June 29 event ===
List of reported tornadoes - Friday, 29 June 2012
F#	T#	Location	District/ County	Coord.	Time (UTC)	Path length	Comments/Damage
Germany
F1	T2	Wesendahl	Brandenburg	52.60°N 13.78°E	2150	1.6 kilometres (1.0 mi)	
Sources: ESSL Severe Weather Database

== July ==
=== July 7 event ===
List of reported tornadoes - Saturday, 7 July 2012
F#	T#	Location	District/ County	Coord.	Time (UTC)	Path length	Comments/Damage
Germany
F0	T?	Heuchelheim	Hesse	50.58°N 8.63°E	0920	2 kilometres (1.2 mi)	
France
F0	T1	Montviette	Lower Normandy	49.00°N 0.10°E	1320	6 kilometres (3.7 mi)	Tornado caused minor damage to several homes and snapped branches of many trees.
F0	T1	Verderel-lès-Sauqueuse	Oise	49.52°N 2.08°E	1330	4.7 kilometres (2.9 mi)	A poorly built structure was severely damaged and several homes sustained minor roof damage.
F1	T3	Saint-Pierre-de-Manneville	Oise	49.38°N 0.94°E	1600	3.2 kilometres (2.0 mi)	Numerous trees were snapped or uprooted.
F1	T3	Fervaques	Lower Normandy	49.04°N 0.25°E	1615	14 kilometres (8.7 mi)	Several structures sustained extensive roof damage and many trees were snapped or uprooted.
Sources: ESSL Severe Weather Database

=== July 8 event ===
List of reported tornadoes - Sunday, 8 July 2012
F#	T#	Location	District/ County	Coord.	Time (UTC)	Path length	Comments/Damage
Germany
F0	T?	Vielist	Mecklenburg-Vorpommern	53.54°N 12.66°E	1715	Unknown	Short-lived, multiple-vortex tornado with no damage
F?	T?	Nordhastedt	Schleswig-Holstein	54.17°N 9.18°E	1730	Unknown	
Sources: ESSL Severe Weather Database

=== July 9 event ===
List of reported tornadoes - Monday, 9 July 2012
F#	T#	Location	District/ County	Coord.	Time (UTC)	Path length	Comments/Damage
Russia
F1	T3	Vësnovo	Kaliningrad	54.76°N 22.35°E	1300	2.5 kilometres (1.6 mi)	Tornado damaged a few structures and downed trees and power lines.
Sources: ESSL Severe Weather Database

=== July 10 event ===
List of reported tornadoes - Tuesday, 10 July 2012
F#	T#	Location	District/ County	Coord.	Time (UTC)	Path length	Comments/Damage
Russia
F?	T?	Ostashkov	Tver	57.14°N 33.12°E	2100	Unknown	
Sources: ESSL Severe Weather Database

=== July 11 event ===
List of reported tornadoes - Wednesday, 11 July 2012
F#	T#	Location	District/ County	Coord.	Time (UTC)	Path length	Comments/Damage
Germany
F1	T2	Burgtiefe	Schleswig-Holstein	54.42°N 11.19°E	0020	Unknown	Waterspout flipped a boat before briefly moving onshore
Sources: ESSL Severe Weather Database

=== July 12 event ===
List of reported tornadoes - Thursday, 12 July 2012
F#	T#	Location	District/ County	Coord.	Time (UTC)	Path length	Comments/Damage
Sweden
F?	T?	Södra Höganäs	Skåne	56.19°N 12.58°E	1340	Unknown	Tornado with minor damage
Sources: ESSL Severe Weather Database

=== July 13 event ===
List of reported tornadoes - Friday, 13 July 2012
F#	T#	Location	District/ County	Coord.	Time (UTC)	Path length	Comments/Damage
Germany
F1	T2	Remscheid	North Rhine-Westphalia	51.18°N 7.17°E	1433	Unknown	
F1	T3	Tessin	Mecklenburg-Vorpommern	54.03°N 12.45°E	1714	0.7 kilometres (0.43 mi)	
Sources: ESSL Severe Weather Database

=== July 14 event ===
List of reported tornadoes - Saturday, 14 July 2012
F#	T#	Location	District/ County	Coord.	Time (UTC)	Path length	Comments/Damage
Poland
F1	T3	Bagienica	Kuyavian-Pomeranian	53.47°N 17.78°E	1445	4 kilometres (2.5 mi)	At least one home sustained severe roof damage
F3	T6	Wielkie Gacno	Kuyavian-Pomeranian, Pomeranian	53.72°N 18.48°E	1510	41 kilometres (25 mi)	1 death – Powerful, long-tracked tornado caused extensive damage in several towns. One person was killed in village Wycinki and 10 others were injured.
F1	T3	Szałwinek	Gmina Kwidzyn, Pomeranian Voivodeship	53.84°N 18.48°E	1550	8 kilometres (5.0 mi)	High-end F1 tornado caused damage in Szałwinek and surrounding areas. 9 residential buildings and outbuildings in Mątowskie Pastwiska were damaged, especially near intersection of DW525 and DW602 road. More than 22 trees were downed. Debris was carried 1 - 2 kilometers from their current household.
F3	T6	Sztum	Pomeranian	53.93°N 19.03°E	1600	9 kilometres (5.6 mi)	A second, similarly intense tornado developed about 20 minutes after the previous one dissipated. Severe damage was reported in several towns, with the worst being in Sztum and surrounding areas, including Barlewiczki. 1 person was injured
Sources: ESSL Severe Weather Database

=== July 15 event ===
List of reported tornadoes - Sunday, 15 July 2012
F#	T#	Location	District/ County	Coord.	Time (UTC)	Path length	Comments/Damage
Turkey
F?	T?	Selendi	Manisa	38.74°N 28.87°E	1130	Unknown	A weak tornado caused damage to a few buildings.
Austria
F1	T2	Gilgenberg am Weilhart	Upper Austria	48.13°N 12.93°E	1300	Unknown	
France
F0	T1	Les Granges du Bois	Franche-Comté	47.87°N 6.47°E	1400	0.5 kilometres (0.31 mi)	
Sources: ESSL Severe Weather Database

=== July 16 event ===
List of reported tornadoes - Monday, 16 July 2012
F#	T#	Location	District/ County	Coord.	Time (UTC)	Path length	Comments/Damage
Poland
F0	T?	Kazimierza Wielka	Świętokrzyskie	50.27°N 20.48°E	0725	Unknown	
F?	T?	Podlesie, Tychy	Śląskie	50.18°N 18.98°E	1125	Unknown	
Sources: ESSL Severe Weather Database

=== July 17 event ===
List of reported tornadoes - Tuesday, 17 July 2012
F#	T#	Location	District/ County	Coord.	Time (UTC)	Path length	Comments/Damage
Russia
F1	T?	Khorn'yaly	Chuvashia	55.91°N 47.80°E	1030	Unknown	
F1	T?	Dubovskiy rayon	Volgogradskaya oblast'	49.48°N 44.62°E	1705	unknown	77 houses were damaged
Sources: ESSL Severe Weather Database

=== July 19 event ===
List of reported tornadoes - Thursday, 19 July 2012
F#	T#	Location	District/ County	Coord.	Time (UTC)	Path length	Comments/Damage
Denmark
F?	T?	Skødstrup	Midtjylland	56.27°N 10.32°E	1400	Unknown	
F?	T?	Keldet	Syddanmark	55.30°N 9.60°E	1615	unknown	
Belarus
F?	T?	Buts'keviche	Minskaya voblasts'	53.80°N 26.82°E	1600	Unknown	
Sources: ESSL Severe Weather Database

=== July 20 event ===
List of reported tornadoes - Friday, 20 July 2012
F#	T#	Location	District/ County	Coord.	Time (UTC)	Path length	Comments/Damage
France
F0	T?	Ghyvelde	Nord-Pas-de-Calais	51.05°N 2.53°E	0850	0.6 kilometres (0.37 mi)	
Sources: ESSL Severe Weather Database

=== July 25 event ===
List of reported tornadoes - Wednesday, 25 July 2012
F#	T#	Location	District/ County	Coord.	Time (UTC)	Path length	Comments/Damage
Russia
F?	T?	Volkovoyno	Vladimirskaya oblast'	56.32°N 41.01°E	1610	unknown	Houses were damaged and roofs were removed.
Sources: ESSL Severe Weather Database

=== July 30 event ===
List of reported tornadoes - Monday, 30 July 2012
F#	T#	Location	District/ County	Coord.	Time (UTC)	Path length	Comments/Damage
Germany
F?	T?	Mölln	Schleswig-Holstein	53.60°N 10.66°E	1153	unknown	No settlements were affected
Sources: ESSL Severe Weather Database

=== July 31 event ===
List of reported tornadoes - Tuesday, 31 July 2012
F#	T#	Location	District/ County	Coord.	Time (UTC)	Path length	Comments/Damage
Sweden
F?	T?	Östra Grevie	Skåne	55.44°N 13.15°E	1400	unknown	Brief touchdown
Russia
F?	T?	Nizhniy Chov	Komi	61.70°N 50.78°E	1630	unknown	Tornado only impacted forested areas.
Sources: ESSL Severe Weather Database

== August ==
=== August 2 event ===
List of reported tornadoes - Thursday, 2 August 2012
F#	T#	Location	District/ County	Coord.	Time (UTC)	Path length	Comments/Damage
Netherlands
F0	T?	Zwolle	Overijssel	52.03°N 6.66°E	0200	Unknown	Brief tornado damaged a flag pole
Sweden
F?	T?	Björlanda	Västra Götaland	57.77°N 11.80°E	1000	Unknown	Tornado struck a port, damaging several boats.
Sources: ESSL Severe Weather Database

=== August 4 event ===
List of reported tornadoes - Saturday, 4 August 2012
F#	T#	Location	District/ County	Coord.	Time (UTC)	Path length	Comments/Damage
Russia
F?	T?	Krasnopolets	Tver	56.84°N 31.36°E	1430	9 kilometres (5.6 mi)	Tornado damaged trees and power lines along a narrow path
Sources: ESSL Severe Weather Database

=== August 6 event ===
List of reported tornadoes - Monday, 6 August 2012
F#	T#	Location	District/ County	Coord.	Time (UTC)	Path length	Comments/Damage
Denmark
F?	T?	Bredebro	Southern Denmark	55.05°N 8.75°E	0900	Unknown	
Sources: ESSL Severe Weather Database

=== August 7 event ===
List of reported tornadoes - Tuesday, 7 August 2012
F#	T#	Location	District/ County	Coord.	Time (UTC)	Path length	Comments/Damage
Sweden
F?	T?	Jämtlandsfjällen	Jämtland	62.94°N 12.32°E	1400	Unknown	
Sources: ESSL Severe Weather Database

=== August 10 event ===
List of reported tornadoes - Friday, 10 August 2012
F#	T#	Location	District/ County	Coord.	Time (UTC)	Path length	Comments/Damage
Turkey
F?	T?	Çatalzeytin	Kastamonu	41.95°N 34.22°E	1300	Unknown	Three buildings lost their roof, two fishing huts collapsed, and one boat sank.
Sources: ESSL Severe Weather Database

=== August 17 event ===
List of reported tornadoes - Friday, 17 August 2012
F#	T#	Location	District/ County	Coord.	Time (UTC)	Path length	Comments/Damage
Russia
F1	T?	Tuapse	Krasnodar	44.11°N 39.07°E	0900	Unknown	
Sources: ESSL Severe Weather Database

=== August 21 event ===
List of reported tornadoes - Tuesday, 21 August 2012
F#	T#	Location	District/ County	Coord.	Time (UTC)	Path length	Comments/Damage
Netherlands
F1	T?	De Punt	Drenthe	53.12°N 6.60°E	1715	0.6 kilometres (0.37 mi)	Damage limited to vegetation
Sources: ESSL Severe Weather Database

=== August 22 event ===
List of reported tornadoes - Wednesday, 22 August 2012
F#	T#	Location	District/ County	Coord.	Time (UTC)	Path length	Comments/Damage
Sweden
F1	T?	Tingsryd	Kronoberg	56.55°N 14.98°E	1300	Unknown	
F?	T?	Arpemåla	Kronoberg	56.57°N 15.37°E	1300	Unknown	Tornado damaged trees, wagons, and cars
Sources: ESSL Severe Weather Database

=== August 25 event ===
List of reported tornadoes - Saturday, 25 August 2012
F#	T#	Location	District/ County	Coord.	Time (UTC)	Path length	Comments/Damage
Italy
F0	T?	Arenzano	Genoa	44.40°N 8.68°E	1130	Unknown	
Sweden
F?	T?	Skoghall	Värmland	59.33°N 13.46°E	1500	Unknown	
Austria
F2	T4	Ellmau	Tyrol	47.52°N 12.30°E	1630	10 kilometres (6.2 mi)	Large tornado, up to 1 km (0.62 mi) wide at times, caused extensive damage near Ellmau.
Sources: ESSL Severe Weather Database

=== August 26 event ===
List of reported tornadoes - Sunday, 26 August 2012
F#	T#	Location	District/ County	Coord.	Time (UTC)	Path length	Comments/Damage
Croatia
F?	T?	Poreč	Istria	45.23°N 13.59°E	0800	Unknown	
Italy
F0	T?	Ladispoli	Rome	41.95°N 12.07°E	0955	Unknown	
F1	T?	Ostia	Rome	41.76°N 12.25°E	1030	Unknown	
Sweden
F?	T?	Märsta	Stockholm	59.64°N 17.85°E	1330	Unknown	
Netherlands
F0	T?	Westkapelle	Veere	51.54°N 3.41°E	1610	Unknown	
Sources: ESSL Severe Weather Database

=== August 30 event ===
List of reported tornadoes - Thursday, 30 August 2012
F#	T#	Location	District/ County	Coord.	Time (UTC)	Path length	Comments/Damage
Spain
F?	T?	Andratx	Balearic Islands	39.56°N 2.42°E	1530	Unknown	Fast moving tornado with debris cloud
Sources: ESSL Severe Weather Database

=== August 31 event ===
List of reported tornadoes - Friday, 31 August 2012
F#	T#	Location	District/ County	Coord.	Time (UTC)	Path length	Comments/Damage
Italy
F?	T?	Chiavari	Genoa	44.32°N 9.30°E	0555	Unknown	Waterspout briefly moved onshore
F?	T?	Quarto d'Altino	Venice	45.55°N 12.40°E	1645	Unknown	Short-lived multiple vortex tornado
Germany
F?	T?	Travemünde	Schleswig-Holstein	53.95°N 10.87°E	1106	Unknown	
F?	T?	Bad Nauheim	Hesse	50.38°N 8.74°E	1640	Unknown	
Sources: ESSL Severe Weather Database

== September ==
=== September 1 event ===
List of reported tornadoes - Saturday, 1 September 2012
F#	T#	Location	District/ County	Coord.	Time (UTC)	Path length	Comments/Damage
Italy
F0	T?	Catanzaro	Catanzaro	38.89°N 16.60°E	1500	Unknown	Waterspout briefly moved onshore
Sources: ESSL Severe Weather Database

=== September 2 event ===
List of reported tornadoes - Sunday, 2 September 2012
F#	T#	Location	District/ County	Coord.	Time (UTC)	Path length	Comments/Damage
Italy
F2	T?	Minervino Murge	Barletta-Andria-Trani	41.08°N 16.08°E	1715	Unknown	Tornado damaged many homes, olive groves, and vineyards.
F0	T?	Catanzaro	Catanzaro	38.89°N 16.60°E	1800	Unknown	Waterspout briefly moved onshore
F?	T?	Corigliano Calabro	Cosenza	39.59°N 16.52°E	1930	Unknown	
Sources: ESSL Severe Weather Database

=== September 3 event ===
List of reported tornadoes - Monday, 3 September 2012
F#	T#	Location	District/ County	Coord.	Time (UTC)	Path length	Comments/Damage
Sweden
F0	T1	Ljusne	Gävleborg	61.22°N 17.13°E	1230	Unknown	Tornado caused minor damage
Malta
F?	T?	Valletta	South Eastern Region	35.90°N 14.52°E	1630	Unknown	Waterspout briefly moved onshore
Sources: ESSL Severe Weather Database

=== September 10 event ===
List of reported tornadoes - Monday, 10 September 2012
F#	T#	Location	District/ County	Coord.	Time (UTC)	Path length	Comments/Damage
Turkey
F?	T?	Karlıova	Bingöl	39.27°N 40.98°E	1130	Unknown	The roof of a school building was torn off and windows were blown out.
Sources: ESSL Severe Weather Database

=== September 13 event ===
List of reported tornadoes - Thursday, 13 September 2012
F#	T#	Location	District/ County	Coord.	Time (UTC)	Path length	Comments/Damage
Spain
F?	T?	Cala Millor	Balearic Islands	39.60°N 3.39°E	1319	Unknown	
Sources: ESSL Severe Weather Database

=== September 24 event ===
List of reported tornadoes - Monday, 24 September 2012
F#	T#	Location	District/ County	Coord.	Time (UTC)	Path length	Comments/Damage
Italy
F?	T?	Pianazze	Liguria	44.11°N 9.88°E	1400	Unknown	Homes and trees were damaged. One person was injured by flying debris.
Germany
F1	T?	Damme	Lower Saxony	52.49°N 8.22°E	1503	Unknown	
F2	T5	Löningen	Lower Saxony	52.73°N 7.77°E	1550	Unknown	
Sources: ESSL Severe Weather Database

=== September 25 event ===
List of reported tornadoes - Tuesday, 25 September 2012
F#	T#	Location	District/ County	Coord.	Time (UTC)	Path length	Comments/Damage
France
F1	T2	Wargnies	Somme	50.03°N 2.25°E	1600	0.9 kilometres (0.56 mi)	Numerous trees were snapped or uprooted and crops were flattened.
Sources: ESSL Severe Weather Database

=== September 27 event ===
List of reported tornadoes - Thursday, 27 September 2012
F#	T#	Location	District/ County	Coord.	Time (UTC)	Path length	Comments/Damage
France
F0	T1	Gizy	Aisne	49.60°N 3.77°E	0615	1.4 kilometres (0.87 mi)	Several trees had snapped branches and a few homes sustained minor roof damage.
Sources: ESSL Severe Weather Database

=== September 28 event ===
List of reported tornadoes - Friday, 28 September 2012
F#	T#	Location	District/ County	Coord.	Time (UTC)	Path length	Comments/Damage
Spain
F1	T3	Gandia	Valencia	38.97°N 0.18°W	1800	Unknown	Tornado struck Gandia, causing widespread damage and injuring 35 people.
Sources: ESSL Severe Weather Database

== October ==
=== October 2 event ===
List of reported tornadoes - Tuesday, 2 October 2012
F#	T#	Location	District/ County	Coord.	Time (UTC)	Path length	Comments/Damage
Slovenia
F0	T?	Lipica	Sežana	45.67°N 13.86°E	1422	0.3 kilometres (0.19 mi)	Brief tornado touched down along the border of Slovenia and Italy.
Turkey
F?	T?	Türkler	Antalya	36.61°N 38.81°E	1730	10 kilometres (6.2 mi)	Tornado uprooted trees and damaged shops
Sources: ESSL Severe Weather Database

=== October 4 event ===
List of reported tornadoes - Thursday, 4 October 2012
F#	T#	Location	District/ County	Coord.	Time (UTC)	Path length	Comments/Damage
Netherlands
F?	T?	Rijswijk	South Holland	51.80°N 5.03°E	1105	Unknown	Brief tornado
Czech Republic
F1	T2	Hovězí	Zlín	49.30°N 18.06°E	1950	Unknown	Several buildings sustained roof damage, playgrounds were destroyed, and windows were shattered. Many trees were also downed.
Sources: ESSL Severe Weather Database

=== October 8 event ===
List of reported tornadoes - Monday, 8 October 2012
F#	T#	Location	District/ County	Coord.	Time (UTC)	Path length	Comments/Damage
Russia
F?	T?	Kazanovka	Chelyabinsk	53.50°N 61.20°E	0700	Unknown	
Sources: ESSL Severe Weather Database

=== October 9 event ===
List of reported tornadoes - Tuesday, 9 October 2012
F#	T#	Location	District/ County	Coord.	Time (UTC)	Path length	Comments/Damage
Turkey
F1	T2	Şahinbey	Gaziantep	36.91°N 37.20°E	1230	Unknown	A pickup truck was moved by the tornado and seven homes were damaged. The children were injured by the storm.
Sources: ESSL Severe Weather Database

=== October 10 event ===
List of reported tornadoes - Wednesday, 10 October 2012
F#	T#	Location	District/ County	Coord.	Time (UTC)	Path length	Comments/Damage
Turkey
F?	T?	Rhodes	Dodecanese	36.37°N 28.22°E	0530	Unknown	Waterspout moved onshore and damaged a hotel
Sources: ESSL Severe Weather Database

=== October 11 event ===
List of reported tornadoes - Thursday, 11 October 2012
F#	T#	Location	District/ County	Coord.	Time (UTC)	Path length	Comments/Damage
Denmark
F?	T?	Haslev	Zealand	55.33°N 11.97°E	1300	Unknown	
Sources: ESSL Severe Weather Database

=== October 12 event ===
List of reported tornadoes - Friday, 12 October 2012
F#	T#	Location	District/ County	Coord.	Time (UTC)	Path length	Comments/Damage
Georgia
F?	T?	Kobuleti	Adjara	41.82°N 41.77°E	0500	Unknown	Tornado damaged homes, cars, and power lines in Kobuleti
Italy
F0	T?	Ostia Antica	Lazio	41.75°N 12.30°E	1500	Unknown	
Sources: ESSL Severe Weather Database

=== October 13 event ===
List of reported tornadoes - Saturday, 13 October 2012
F#	T#	Location	District/ County	Coord.	Time (UTC)	Path length	Comments/Damage
Croatia
F?	T?	N of Cavtat	Dubrovnik-Neretva	55.33°N 11.97°E	1500	Unknown	One of three waterspouts briefly moved onshore before dissipating
Sources: ESSL Severe Weather Database

=== October 14 event ===
List of reported tornadoes - Sunday, 14 October 2012
F#	T#	Location	District/ County	Coord.	Time (UTC)	Path length	Comments/Damage
France
F1	T3	Saint-Hilaire-le-Vouhis	Pays de la Loire	46.68°N 1.13°W	0530	3.4 kilometres (2.1 mi)	A short-lived tornado passed directly through Saint-Hilaire-le-Vouhis, damaging numerous homes, trees, and vehicles. Several homes sustained severe roof and structural damage.
F1	T3	Les Pennes-Mirabeau	Bouches-du-Rhône	43.41°N 5.63°E	1340	4 kilometres (2.5 mi)	A multiple vortex tornado struck towns near Les Pennes-Mirabeau, causing extensive damage and injuring 20 people. Many homes and businesses sustained roof and structural damage. Numerous trees were also snapped or uprooted along the tornado's path.
F0	T1	La Croix-Valmer	Provence-Alpes-Côte d'Azur	43.20°N 6.57°E	1630	3.8 kilometres (2.4 mi)	Relatively weak tornado snapped or uprooted many trees and causing minor damage to roofs and fencing.
Sources: ESSL Severe Weather Database

=== October 15 event ===
List of reported tornadoes - Monday, 15 October 2012
F#	T#	Location	District/ County	Coord.	Time (UTC)	Path length	Comments/Damage
Greece
F2	T?	Vasiliki	Ionian Islands	38.63°N 20.59°E	0610	Unknown	A kiosk was destroyed and numerous olive trees were uprooted
Italy
F?	T?	Moneglia	Genoa	44.24°N 9.49°E	0700	Unknown	A waterspout briefly moved onshore
Sources: ESSL Severe Weather Database

=== October 21 event ===
List of reported tornadoes - Sunday, 21 October 2012
F#	T#	Location	District/ County	Coord.	Time (UTC)	Path length	Comments/Damage
Cyprus
F?	T?	Miliou	Paphos	34.94°N 32.46°E	1200	Unknown	A home sustained €10,000 (US$13,000) worth of damage.
Sources: ESSL Severe Weather Database

=== October 25 event ===
List of reported tornadoes - Thursday, 25 October 2012
F#	T#	Location	District/ County	Coord.	Time (UTC)	Path length	Comments/Damage
Malta
F0	T?	Buġibba	St. Paul's Bay	35.95°N 14.41°E	0930	Unknown	
Portugal
F?	T?	Igrejinha	Alentejo	38.71°N 7.86°W	1130	Unknown	More than 100 trees were damaged
F?	T?	Castelo Branco	Castelo Branco	39.81°N 7.53°W	1330	Unknown	Tornado touched down in the industrial sector of Castelo Branco. Two factories were severely damaged and three others sustained minor damage. Additionally, 32 vehicles were damaged.
Spain
F?	T?	Quintana de la Serena	Extremadura	38.73°N 5.67°W	1300	Unknown	
Sources: ESSL Severe Weather Database

=== October 26 event ===
List of reported tornadoes - Friday, 26 October 2012
F#	T#	Location	District/ County	Coord.	Time (UTC)	Path length	Comments/Damage
France
F0	T1	Eccica-Suarella	Corse-du-Sud	35.95°N 14.41°E	2050	200 metres (660 ft)	Brief tornado uprooted trees.
Sources: ESSL Severe Weather Database

=== October 27 event ===
List of reported tornadoes - Saturday, 27 October 2012
F#	T#	Location	District/ County	Coord.	Time (UTC)	Path length	Comments/Damage
Italy
F0	T1	Lido dei Pini	Lazio	41.53°N 12.56°E	0015	Unknown	Strong waterspout briefly moved onshore
Sources: ESSL Severe Weather Database

=== October 29 event ===
List of reported tornadoes - Monday, 29 October 2012
F#	T#	Location	District/ County	Coord.	Time (UTC)	Path length	Comments/Damage
Greece
F2	T?	Lechaina	West Greece	37.93°N 21.27°E	0300	Unknown	Tornado caused significant damage to greenhouses, livestock facilities, roofs, and power poles.
Sources: ESSL Severe Weather Database

== November ==
=== November 1 event ===
List of reported tornadoes - Thursday, 1 November 2012
F#	T#	Location	District/ County	Coord.	Time (UTC)	Path length	Comments/Damage
Croatia
F?	T?	Sugari	Istria	45.08°N 13.96°E	0500	Unknown	Tornado damaged buildings, cars, and trees in Sugari and Felini.
Turkey
F2	T?	Davutlar	Aydın	37.72°N 27.28°E	2215	1 kilometre (0.62 mi)	Several buildings had their roofs blown more than 100 m (330 ft) away and a car was thrown about 20 m (66 ft). Numerous pine trees were also snapped along the tornado's path.
Sources: ESSL Severe Weather Database

=== November 4 event ===
List of reported tornadoes - Sunday, 4 November 2012
F#	T#	Location	District/ County	Coord.	Time (UTC)	Path length	Comments/Damage
Spain
F?	T?	El Viso del Alcor	Seville	37.38°N 5.72°W	1350	Unknown	Possible gustnado
Sources: ESSL Severe Weather Database

=== November 8 event ===
List of reported tornadoes - Thursday, 8 November 2012
F#	T#	Location	District/ County	Coord.	Time (UTC)	Path length	Comments/Damage
Turkey
F?	T?	Kızılot	Antalya	36.70°N 31.57°E	0500	Unknown	Tornado damaged a hotel and uprooted trees
F?	T?	Konaklı	Antalya	36.59°N 31.85°E	1200	Unknown	Tornado damaged greenhouses
Sources: ESSL Severe Weather Database

=== November 16 event ===
List of reported tornadoes - Friday, 16 November 2012
F#	T#	Location	District/ County	Coord.	Time (UTC)	Path length	Comments/Damage
Portugal
F3	T?	Lagoa	Faro	37.18°N 8.43°W	1400	15 kilometres (9.3 mi)	A powerful Waterspout moved onshore in Lagoa and caused extensive damage. Several buildings were severely damaged or destroyed and cars were thrown. Many trees were snapped or uprooted and some showed signs of debarking (a sign indicative of violent tornadoes). Initial assessments revealed damage indicates showing greater than F3 intensity; however, overall damage did not support rating it higher. The tornado tracked for approximately 15 km (9.3 mi), at times reaching 300 m (980 ft) in diameter, before dissipating. Thirteen people were injured by the storm.
Sources: ESSL Severe Weather Database

=== November 17 event ===
List of reported tornadoes - Saturday, 17 November 2012
F#	T#	Location	District/ County	Coord.	Time (UTC)	Path length	Comments/Damage
Spain
F?	T?	Torremolinos	Málaga	36.64°N 4.49°W	1004	Unknown	
Sources: ESSL Severe Weather Database

=== November 27 event ===
List of reported tornadoes - Tuesday, 27 November 2012
F#	T#	Location	District/ County	Coord.	Time (UTC)	Path length	Comments/Damage
Italy
F1	T?	Rosignano Marittimo	Livorno	43.41°N 10.47°E	1245	1.3 kilometres	Short-lived tornado damaged 35 homes, 6 of which lost their entire roof, and downed numerous trees and power lines. Debris from homes damaged several vehicles as well.
Sources: ESSL Severe Weather Database

=== November 28 event ===
List of reported tornadoes - Wednesday, 28 November 2012
F#	T#	Location	District/ County	Coord.	Time (UTC)	Path length	Comments/Damage
Italy
F3	T6	Taranto	Taranto	40.56°N 17.21°E	1045	21 kilometres (13 mi)	1 death – A very strong tornado hit the cities of Taranto and Statte where it has inflicted heavy damage. Some cars have been thrown up in the air, many houses have completely lost the roof and some buildings have lost some wall. 42 people were injured,22 of which in the steelplant of Taranto and 7 in a school of Statte.
Sources: ESSL Severe Weather Database

=== November 29 event ===
List of reported tornadoes - Thursday, 29 November 2012
F#	T#	Location	District/ County	Coord.	Time (UTC)	Path length	Comments/Damage
Greece
F1	T2	Préveza	Epirus	38.95°N 20.75°E	0700	1 kilometre (0.62 mi)	Tornado caused moderate damage to farms and downed many trees.
F1	T2	Argassi	Ionian Islands	37.77°N 20.92°E	0800	Unknown	Tornado destroyed a warehouse, garage, and canteen. Losses from the storm were estimated at €28,000 (US$37,000).
F2	T?	Katakolo	West Greece	37.66°N 21.34°E	1115	Unknown	Tornado uprooted move than 100 olive trees, destroyed several small metal structures, and unroofed homes.
F1	T?	Alfioúsa	West Greece	37.65°N 21.53°E	1200	Unknown	Tornado damaged crops and uprooted numerous trees
Sources: ESSL Severe Weather Database

== December ==
=== December 3 event ===
List of reported tornadoes - Monday, 3 December 2012
F#	T#	Location	District/ County	Coord.	Time (UTC)	Path length	Comments/Damage
Turkey
F?	T?	Konaklı	Antalya	36.59°N 31.86°E	1100	Unknown	Possible tornado
F?	T?	Gazipaşa	Antalya	36.27°N 32.32°E	1530	Unknown	Tornado damaged greenhouses
Sources: ESSL Severe Weather Database

=== December 5 event ===
List of reported tornadoes - Wednesday, 5 December 2012
F#	T#	Location	District/ County	Coord.	Time (UTC)	Path length	Comments/Damage
Turkey
F0	T?	Cevdetiye	Osmaniye	37.14°N 36.20°E	1700	Unknown	Tornado tore the roofs off six stalls and killed three sheep.
Sources: ESSL Severe Weather Database

=== December 9 event ===
List of reported tornadoes - Sunday, 9 December 2012
F#	T#	Location	District/ County	Coord.	Time (UTC)	Path length	Comments/Damage
Turkey
F?	T?	Marmaris	Muğla	36.85°N 28.27°E	1700	Unknown	Waterspout damaged several boats in a marina before moving onshore and damaging a restaurant.
Sources: ESSL Severe Weather Database

=== December 10 event ===
List of reported tornadoes - Monday, 10 December 2012
F#	T#	Location	District/ County	Coord.	Time (UTC)	Path length	Comments/Damage
Turkey
F1	T?	Ortaköy	Mersin	36.05°N 32.78°E	1400	Unknown	Waterspout moved onshore, damaging greenhouses and uprooting trees.
Sources: ESSL Severe Weather Database

=== December 16 event ===
List of reported tornadoes - Sunday, 16 December 2012
F#	T#	Location	District/ County	Coord.	Time (UTC)	Path length	Comments/Damage
United Kingdom
F?	T?	Sancreed	Cornwall	50.10°N 5.60°W	0915	100 metres (330 ft)	Brief tornado damaged a farm
Sources: ESSL Severe Weather Database

=== December 17 event ===
List of reported tornadoes - Monday, 17 December 2012
F#	T#	Location	District/ County	Coord.	Time (UTC)	Path length	Comments/Damage
Italy
F0	T?	Palombara Sabina (1st tornado)	Rome	42.07°N 12.77°E	1650	Unknown	One of three simultaneous tornadoes in Palombara Sabina
F0	T?	Palombara Sabina (2nd tornado)	Rome		1650	Unknown	One of three simultaneous tornadoes in Palombara Sabina
F0	T?	Palombara Sabina (3rd tornado)	Rome		1650	Unknown	One of three simultaneous tornadoes in Palombara Sabina
Sources: ESSL Severe Weather Database

=== December 29 event ===
List of reported tornadoes - Saturday, 29 December 2012
F#	T#	Location	District/ County	Coord.	Time (UTC)	Path length	Comments/Damage
Greece
F?	T?	Palaiochóra	Cornwall	35.23°N 23.68°E	0800	0.5 kilometres (0.31 mi)	Tornado destroyed farms near the sea and downed several trees
Sources: ESSL Severe Weather Database

== See also ==
- Tornadoes of 2012
