= List of European tornadoes in 2014 =

This is a list of all tornadoes that were confirmed throughout Europe by the European Severe Storms Laboratory and local meteorological agencies during 2014. Unlike the United States, the original Fujita Scale and the TORRO scale are used to rank tornadoes across the continent.

== European yearly total ==
There have been 291 confirmed tornadic events reported in Europe in 2022. Countries not listed in this table have no reported tornadoes thus far in 2022.

Tornadoes by Country (as of December 9, 2014)
Country	Total	F?	F0	F1	F2	F3	F4	F5
Austria	1	0	0	0	1	0	0	0
Belarus	3	1	0	1	1	0	0	0
Belgium	8	1	1	4	2	0	0	0
Bosnia and Herzegovina	2	2	0	0	0	0	0	0
Bulgaria	1	0	0	1	0	0	0	0
Croatia	7	7	0	0	0	0	0	0
Czech Republic	0	0	0	0	0	0	0	0
Denmark	0	0	0	0	0	0	0	0
Estonia	2	2	0	0	0	0	0	0
France	59	0	32	24	3	0	0	0
Germany	43	17	13	10	3	0	0	0
Greece	11	5	3	3	0	0	0	0
Hungary	4	4	0	0	0	0	0	0
Ireland	3	2	1	0	0	0	0	0
Italy	52	16	19	14	3	0	0	0
Kazakhstan	1	1	0	0	0	0	0	0
Latvia	0	0	0	0	0	0	0	0
Lithuania	0	0	0	0	0	0	0	0
Malta	2	1	0	1	0	0	0	0
Netherlands	1	4	0	3	0	0	0	0
Norway	2	1	1	0	0	0	0	0
Poland	3	1	0	2	0	0	0	0
Portugal	2	1	0	1	0	0	0	0
Romania	5	4	1	0	0	0	0	0
Russia	30	18	8	2	1	1	0	0
Serbia	5	5	0	0	0	0	0	0
Slovakia	1	1	0	0	0	0	0	0
Slovenia	1	0	0	0	1	0	0	0
Spain	4	3	0	1	0	0	0	0
Sweden	3	3	0	0	0	0	0	0
Switzerland	0	0	0	0	0	0	0	0
Turkey	22	15	1	4	2	0	0	0
Ukraine	7	3	1	2	1	0	0	0
United Kingdom	12	8	1	3	0	0	0	0
Total	303	126	82	76	18	1	0	0

== January ==
=== January 2 event ===
List of reported tornadoes - Thursday, January 2, 2014
F#	T#	Location	District/ County	Coord.	Time (UTC)	Path length	Comments/Damage
France
F0	T?	Fessenheim	Région Alsace	47.92°N 7.53°E	1340	1,3 km	Little damage

=== January 3 event ===
List of reported tornadoes - Friday, January 3, 2014
F#	T#	Location	District/ County	Coord.	Time (UTC)	Path length	Comments/Damage
France
F1	T?	Leers	Nord-Pas-de-Calais	51.94°N 5.93°E	1400	5 km	houses damaged, factory chimney collapsed; trees damaged; the event also tracked over a small area in Belgium.
Netherlands
F1	T?	Schoonebeek	Drenthe	52.66°N 6.89°E	1720	?	Rooftales are torn off and the upper part of a wall of a barn is blown in. Trees are downed or branches are torn off. An eyewitness has observed a black funnel. The event happened at the southern point of a thunderstorm.
Germany
F1	T2	Remsfeld	Hessen	51.00°N 9.47°E	2056	?	tornado caused damage in Remsfeld; eight houses damaged, forest area damaged

=== January 4 event ===
List of reported tornadoes - Saturday, January 4, 2014
F#	T#	Location	District/ County	Coord.	Time (UTC)	Path length	Comments/Damage
Portugal
F1	T?	Vilela	Braga	41.24°N 8.36°W	0300	4 km	Some damage to some houses and trees.

=== January 13 event ===
List of reported tornadoes - Monday, January 13, 2014
F#	T#	Location	District/ County	Coord.	Time (UTC)	Path length	Comments/Damage
United Kingdom
F0	T1	Kingsbridge	Devon	50.28°N 3.77°W	1240	?	some minor damage

=== January 25 event ===
List of reported tornadoes - Saturday, January 25, 2014
F#	T#	Location	District/ County	Coord.	Time (UTC)	Path length	Comments/Damage
United Kingdom
F1	T2	Llangwyryfon	Wales	52.30°N 4.07°W	1400	0,5 km	Some damage to farms and trees
United Kingdom
F1	T2	Ordsall	England	53.31°N 0.95°W	1425	1,5 km	50 houses damaged; chimney stacks collapsed, tiles and TV aerials blown some distance away, gable ends damaged; lamp post knocked down; fallen trees
United Kingdom
F1	T2	Upper Wield	England	51.14°N 1.10°W	1430	?	Some damage to sheds
United Kingdom
F1	T3	Nuneaton	England	52.52°N 1.47°W	1458	3,5 km	roofs of 5 houses severely damaged; about 30 houses have lost roof tiles; garage roofs torn off; debris blown around; localized damage
United Kingdom
F?	T?	Harlow	Essex	51.78°N 0.17°W	1635	?	Damage to houses and trees.
United Kingdom
F1	T2	Acton	Suffolk	52.07°N 0.76°E	1645	2 km	roof damage
United Kingdom
F1	T2	Chobham	Surrey	51.33°N 0.60°E	1700	?	houses damage
France
F1	T2	Oye Plage	Nord-Pas-de-Calais	50.98°N 2.05°E	1805	2,4 km	Roof damaged and trees damage
France
F1	T2	Isbergues	Nord-Pas-de-Calais	50.61°N 2.46°E	1830	3,6 km	Roofs damaged
Belgium
F2	T4	Rekkem	West Flanders	50.70°N 3.16°E	1850	12,8 km	A tornado hit areas in Belgium and France on Saturday evening. 3 people got injured; Path track started over Belgium, tracked further briefly over Halliun town (France) and tracked further eastward over Rekkem and into Aalbeke village area
Belgium
F1	T3	Sint-Jan	West Flanders	51.06°N 3.32°E	1900	3,2 km	Significant damage to some farms.
France
F1	T2	Aubencheul-aux-Bois	Picardy	50.03°N 3.27°E	1930	0,7 km	Little damage

=== January 31 event ===
List of reported tornadoes - Friday, January 31, 2014
F#	T#	Location	District/ County	Coord.	Time (UTC)	Path length	Comments/Damage
Italy
F1	T?	Ostia Antica	Lazio	41.70°N 12.34°E	0300	0,4 km	Damage to a bathhouse and some houses near the beach.

== February ==
=== February 1 event ===
List of reported tornadoes - Saturday, February 1, 2014
F#	T#	Location	District/ County	Coord.	Time (UTC)	Path length	Comments/Damage
Malta
F1	T?	Attard	Malta	35.89°N 14.43°E	1600	?	A severe thunderstorm associated with an intense North African low pressure system passing over the Maltese Islands produced a suspected small tornado at around 4pm that flipped over two light aircraft at the airport and also brought down some large trees. large branches and electricity poles in various locations, including Luqa, Attard and Ta' Qali.

=== February 4 event ===
List of reported tornadoes - Tuesday, February 4, 2014
F#	T#	Location	District/ County	Coord.	Time (UTC)	Path length	Comments/Damage
United Kingdom
F1	T2	Port Erin	Isle of Man	54.10°N 4.78°W	0530	?	Roof damage.

=== February 12 event ===
List of reported tornadoes - Wednesday, February 12, 2014
F#	T#	Location	District/ County	Coord.	Time (UTC)	Path length	Comments/Damage
France
F1	T?	Quelvéhen	Brittany	48.15°N 2.91°W	1415	2.9 km	Roof damage and trees downed

=== February 27 event ===
List of reported tornadoes - Thursday, February 27, 2014
F#	T#	Location	District/ County	Coord.	Time (UTC)	Path length	Comments/Damage
France
F0	T?	Laurière	Limousin	46.08°N 1.48°E	1545	2.1 km	Roof damage and trees damaged.

=== February 28 event ===
List of reported tornadoes - Friday, February 28, 2014
F#	T#	Location	District/ County	Coord.	Time (UTC)	Path length	Comments/Damage
France
F0	T?	Chenay	Poitou-Charentes	46.32°N 0.03°W	0445	3.1 km	Roof damage and trees damaged.
France
F1	T?	Châteauneuf-sur-Charente	Poitou-Charentes	46.32°N 0.03°W	0534	4 km	Roof damage and trees downed.
France
F1	T?	Breuillet	Poitou-Charentes	45.70°N 1.05°W	0545	0,6 km	Some damage

== March ==
=== March 3 event ===
List of reported tornadoes - Monday, March 3, 2014
F#	T#	Location	District/ County	Coord.	Time (UTC)	Path length	Comments/Damage
France
F1	T?	Luçon	Pays de la Loire	46.45°N 1.17°W	0905	3,5 km	Roof damage and trees damaged and farms severely damaged.
France
F0	T1	Neuvic	Aquitaine	45.10°N 0.47°E	1330	0,16 km	Some little damage.
Turkey
F0	T1	Beykonak	Antalya Province	36.34°N 30.30°E	1600	?	Greenhouses slightly damaged.

=== March 6 event ===
List of reported tornadoes - Thursday, March 6, 2014
F#	T#	Location	District/ County	Coord.	Time (UTC)	Path length	Comments/Damage
Italy
F0	T?	Fasano	Apulia	40.83°N 17.36°E	1130	?	Little damage to trees.

=== March 23 event ===
List of reported tornadoes - Sunday, March 23, 2014
F#	T#	Location	District/ County	Coord.	Time (UTC)	Path length	Comments/Damage
Italy
F1	T?	Prevalle	Lombardy	45.55°N 10.42°E	1300	3 km	Damage to homes and an industrial area.
Italy
F0	T?	Maserada sul Piave	Veneto	45.73°N 12.35°E	1517	2 km	Little damage

=== March 27 event ===
List of reported tornadoes - Thursday, March 27, 2014
F#	T#	Location	District/ County	Coord.	Time (UTC)	Path length	Comments/Damage
Italy
F1	T?	Copertino	Apulia	40.23°N 18.07°E	0930	3,8 km	damage to farms and in an industrial area
Italy
F0	T1	Bernalda	Basilicata	40.41°N 16.69°E	1500	5 km	damage to crops and trees.
Greece
F1	T?	Logga	Verdikoússa	39.81°N 21.91°E	1715	?	Roofs severely damaged, trees uprooted and cut power lines and closed roads

=== March 28 event ===
List of reported tornadoes - Friday, March 28, 2014
F#	T#	Location	District/ County	Coord.	Time (UTC)	Path length	Comments/Damage
Turkey
F1	T?	Alaybey	Tekirdağ Province	40.86°N 26.99°E	1100	?	Large trees uprooted, roofs blown off. 1 injured.

=== March 31 event ===
List of reported tornadoes - Monday, March 31, 2014
F#	T#	Location	District/ County	Coord.	Time (UTC)	Path length	Comments/Damage
Portugal
F1	T?	Vilamoura	Faro	37.09°N 8.12°W	1900	?	Tornado hit Vilamoura; two houses damaged (windows smashed, roofs damaged); trees snapped / downed

== April ==
=== April 18 event ===
List of reported tornadoes - Friday, April 18, 2014
F#	T#	Location	District/ County	Coord.	Time (UTC)	Path length	Comments/Damage
Turkey
F1	T?	Alacami	Antalya Province	37.00°N 31.06°E	1030	?	tornado hit Alacami village near Serik town; greenhouses damaged; areas damaged.

=== April 19 event ===
List of reported tornadoes - Saturday, April 19, 2014
F#	T#	Location	District/ County	Coord.	Time (UTC)	Path length	Comments/Damage
Italy
F1	T?	Civitavecchia	Lazio	42.13°N 11.77°E	1200	4 km	tornado damaged some houses and trees (trees snapped / downed)
Italy
F2	T4	Montalto di Castro	Lazio	42.33°N 11.61°E	1200	?	tornado hit Montalto di Castro area, moving from the sea over beach and land area, damaging houses and overthrowing a car. 1 injured.
Turkey
F1	T?	Kösen	Kastamonu Province	41.00°N 34.08°E	1430	?	Some buildings were damaged

=== April 20 event ===
List of reported tornadoes - Sunday, April 20, 2014
F#	T#	Location	District/ County	Coord.	Time (UTC)	Path length	Comments/Damage
Spain
F1	T?	Marchena	Andalusia	37.26°N 5.36°W	1400	?	trees snapped / downed

=== April 29 event ===
List of reported tornadoes - Thursday, April 29, 2014
F#	T#	Location	District/ County	Coord.	Time (UTC)	Path length	Comments/Damage
Hungary
F?	T?	Mezőhegyes	Békés	46.32°N 20.82°E	1430	?	Landspout tornado
Hungary
F?	T?	Nagykamarás	Békés	46.47°N 21.12°E	1430	?	Landspout tornado

=== April 30 event ===
List of reported tornadoes - Wednesday, April 30, 2014
F#	T#	Location	District/ County	Coord.	Time (UTC)	Path length	Comments/Damage
Italy
F2	T5	Nonantola	Emilia-Romagna	44.68°N 11.03°E	1315	13 km	Severe damage to houses, cars, truck, industrial buildings and large damage to woods or forest. 5 people were injured.
Norway
F0	T?	Tolvsrød	Vestfold	59.27°N 10.48°E	1500	0,4 km	Tornado formed over water and hit one or two streets in Tolvsrød; barn damaged; eyewitness reported whirl over water moving further over land

== May ==
=== May 3 event ===
List of reported tornadoes - Saturday, May 3, 2014
F#	T#	Location	District/ County	Coord.	Time (UTC)	Path length	Comments/Damage
France
F0	T0	Les Sables de Biguglia	Corsica	42.60°N 9.50°E	0600	0,2 km	formed as waterspout hit the beach and caused very little damage.
Italy
F0	T0	Ostia Antica	Lazio	41.75°N 12.25°E	0830	?	formed as waterspout and had a brief landfall
Ukraine
F?	T?	Krymka	Zaporizhzhia Oblast	46.93°N 36.44°E	1130	?	Landspout tornado.
France
F0	T?	Olmeto	Corsica	41.72°N 8.92°E	1230	?	Landspout tornado.
Ukraine
F?	T?	Mykolayiv	Mykolayivs'ka Oblast'	46.98°N 32.09°E	1330	?	Landspout tornado.

=== May 10 event ===
List of reported tornadoes - Saturday, May 10, 2014
F#	T#	Location	District/ County	Coord.	Time (UTC)	Path length	Comments/Damage
Turkey
F1	T?	Sarıgerme	Muğla Province	36.70°N 28.70°E	0445	?	tornado hit Sarıgerme village, beach area and nearby forest area
Turkey
F1	T?	Beykonak	Antalya Province	36.33°N 30.29°E	1400	2.5 km	tornado reported; greenhouses damaged; windows destroyed
Greece
F0	T1	Amórion	Eastern Macedonia and Thrace	41.30°N 26.43°E	1445	?	little damage

=== May 11 event ===
List of reported tornadoes - Sunday, May 11, 2014
F#	T#	Location	District/ County	Coord.	Time (UTC)	Path length	Comments/Damage
Italy
F0	T?	Dignano	Friuli-Venezia Giulia	46.08°N 12.94°E	1655	3 km	Some damage in Gradisca and Dignano areas. Trees damage

=== May 13 event ===
List of reported tornadoes - Tuesday, May 13, 2014
F#	T#	Location	District/ County	Coord.	Time (UTC)	Path length	Comments/Damage
Russia
F0	T?	Sannikovo	Altai Krai	53.35°N 83.97°E	1330	?	Minor roof damage
Germany
F0	T1	Glauchau	Saxony	50.83°N 12.53°E	1443	?	a roof was blown over the road.
Germany
F0	T1	Elmpt	North Rhine-Westphalia	51.25°N 6.17°E	1600	0,8 km	some damage
United Kingdom
F0	T0	Newcastle upon Tyne	Northumberland	55.02°N 1.57°W	1800	?	funnel observed with touchdown.

=== May 14 event ===
List of reported tornadoes - Wednesday, May 14, 2014
F#	T#	Location	District/ County	Coord.	Time (UTC)	Path length	Comments/Damage
Serbia
F1	T?	Mlačište	Jablanica District	42.79°N 22.22°E	0800	3 km	10 to 15 houses were damaged; large trees uprooted
Bulgaria
F1	T?	Chepintsi	Sofia	42.76°N 23.43°E	1230	?	tornado hit Chepintsi; 4 houses damaged; roofs partly blown off

=== May 15 event ===
List of reported tornadoes - Thursday, May 15, 2014
F#	T#	Location	District/ County	Coord.	Time (UTC)	Path length	Comments/Damage
Ukraine
F?	T?	Verbovka	Cherkas'ka Oblast'	48.81°N 30.02°E	1230	?	tornado outbreak over Ukraine.
Ukraine
F?	T?	Vil'khove	Kirovohrads'ka Oblast'	48.46°N 30.18°E	1330	?	tornado outbreak over Ukraine.
Romania
F?	T?	Becicherecu Mic	Timiş	45.83°N 21.05°E	1430	?	The funnel cloud was observed
Ukraine
F2	T?	Sarny	Cherkas'ka Oblast'	45.83°N 21.05°E	1645	?	Bus hit and thrown off a road; 7 people injured; 5 people brought to hospital.

=== May 16 event ===
List of reported tornadoes - Friday, May 16, 2014
F#	T#	Location	District/ County	Coord.	Time (UTC)	Path length	Comments/Damage
Poland
F?	T?	Krasnystaw	Lublin Voivodeship	46.08°N 12.94°E	1530	?	Brief tornado touchdown
Ukraine
F?	T?	Anno-leontovychevo	Kirovohrads'ka Oblast'	48.00°N 32.36°E	1555	?	Tornado with duration of 20 minutes.

=== May 19 event ===
List of reported tornadoes - Monday, May 19, 2014
F#	T#	Location	District/ County	Coord.	Time (UTC)	Path length	Comments/Damage
Russia
F2	T?	Padinskiy	Stavropol Krai	44.39°N 43.29°E	1530	?	Large multi vortex tornado observed

=== May 22 event ===
List of reported tornadoes - Thursday, May 22, 2014
F#	T#	Location	District/ County	Coord.	Time (UTC)	Path length	Comments/Damage
United Kingdom
F1	T2	Buckden	Cambridgeshire	52.28°N 0.25°W	1345	?	Some damage
France
F1	T2	Crasville	Lower Normandy	49.55°N 1.33°W	1600	1,8 km	Some damage to trees and roofs.

=== May 23 event ===
List of reported tornadoes - Friday, May 23, 2014
F#	T#	Location	District/ County	Coord.	Time (UTC)	Path length	Comments/Damage
Italy
F0	T0	Cavarzere	Veneto	45.14°N 12.08°E	1545	3 km	Tornado over fields.

=== May 24 event ===
List of reported tornadoes - Saturday, May 24, 2014
F#	T#	Location	District/ County	Coord.	Time (UTC)	Path length	Comments/Damage
Germany
F?	T?	Lindhorst	Lower Saxony	52.37°N 9.28°E	1015	?	Ground contact confirmed by witnesses; touchdown over farmland area
United Kingdom
F0	T1	Tile Cross	England	52.47°N 1.77°W	1745	2,5 km	roofs damage.

=== May 25 event ===
List of reported tornadoes - Sunday, May 25, 2014
F#	T#	Location	District/ County	Coord.	Time (UTC)	Path length	Comments/Damage
Hungary
F?	T?	Tompa	Bács-Kiskun County	46.24°N 19.54°E	1340	?	Landspout tornado.

=== May 26 event ===
List of reported tornadoes - Monday, May 26, 2014
F#	T#	Location	District/ County	Coord.	Time (UTC)	Path length	Comments/Damage
Russia
F1	T?	Kavalerskiy	Rostovskaya oblast'	46.37°N 40.54°E	1230	11,7 km	Damage to houses and trees.

=== May 27 event ===
List of reported tornadoes - Tuesday, May 27, 2014
F#	T#	Location	District/ County	Coord.	Time (UTC)	Path length	Comments/Damage
Italy
F1	T2	Bagnaria Arsa	Friuli-Venezia Giulia	45.88°N 13.29°E	1300	1,2 km	Damage to 40 houses and some trees downed.

=== May 30 event ===
List of reported tornadoes - Friday, May 30, 2014
F#	T#	Location	District/ County	Coord.	Time (UTC)	Path length	Comments/Damage
Turkey
F1	T?	Gerede	Bolu Province	40.71°N 32.26°E	1200	?	Damage to houses and roof blow off.

== June ==
=== June 1 event ===
List of reported tornadoes - Sunday, June 1, 2014
F#	T#	Location	District/ County	Coord.	Time (UTC)	Path length	Comments/Damage
Belarus
F1	T2	Minsk	Minsk	53.86°N 27.48°E	1200	?	tornado observed over the SW areas of Minsk; trees downed

=== June 2 event ===
List of reported tornadoes - Monday, June 2, 2014
F#	T#	Location	District/ County	Coord.	Time (UTC)	Path length	Comments/Damage
Russia
F0	T?	Sergeyevka	Amurskaya oblast	50.78°N 127.33°E	0920	?	Light damage and trees downed

=== June 4 event ===
List of reported tornadoes - Wednesday, June 4, 2014
F#	T#	Location	District/ County	Coord.	Time (UTC)	Path length	Comments/Damage
Ukraine
F?	T?	Studenitsa	Vinnyts'ka Oblast'	49.13°N 28.42°E	0900	?	Landspout tornado.

=== June 7 event ===
List of reported tornadoes - Saturday, June 7, 2014
F#	T#	Location	District/ County	Coord.	Time (UTC)	Path length	Comments/Damage
Spain
F1	T?	Ribeira	Galicia	43.13°N 8.23°W	1100	?	Severe damage in an industrial area

=== June 9 event ===
List of reported tornadoes - Monday, June 9, 2014
F#	T#	Location	District/ County	Coord.	Time (UTC)	Path length	Comments/Damage
Russia
F0	T1	Pen'kovo	Mordovia	54.39°N 43.82°E	1130	0,5 km	Damage to a village and a forest.

=== June 10 event ===
List of reported tornadoes - Tuesday, June 10, 2014
F#	T#	Location	District/ County	Coord.	Time (UTC)	Path length	Comments/Damage
Russia
F0	T?	Staraya Mikhaylovka	Mordovia	54.33°N 45.17°E	1400	?	Weak Landspout tornado.

=== June 11 event ===
List of reported tornadoes - Wednesday, June 11, 2014
F#	T#	Location	District/ County	Coord.	Time (UTC)	Path length	Comments/Damage
Russia
F1	T?	Kidyshevkiy	Chelyabinskaya oblast'	54.13°N 59.94°E	1100	?	two tornados observed which occurred simultaneously
Russia
F2	T?	Yuldashevo	Bashkortostan	54.37°N 59.26°E	1130	5 km	one house destroyed in Yuldashevo village
Germany
F1	T3	Wesenberg	Mecklenburg-Vorpommern	53.29°N 12.93°E	1137	2,2 km	Forest area damaged
Germany
F2	T4	Zwenzow	Mecklenburg-Vorpommern	53.31°N 12.94°E	1140	3.7 km	Tornado hit area of Müritz Nationalpark destroyed forest areas for about 3.7 km path length; intensity up to F2/T4 due to forest devastation, widespread breaking of pine trees and throwing large parts of pine trees. Furthermore, birch trees were snapped and root-lifted; source
Germany
F1	T2	Blumenhagen	Mecklenburg-Vorpommern	53.40°N 13.13°E	1158	2,1 km	greenhouse thrown and destroyed; pavilion lifted and thrown and trees snapped
France
F0	T?	Vèze	Auvergne	45.27°N 3.00°E	1400	?	Little damage over fields.
Russia
F?	T?	Oktyabr'skiy	Orenburgskaya oblast	52.68°N 54.42°E	1638	?	Landspout tornado over fields.

=== June 12 event ===
List of reported tornadoes - Thursday, June 12, 2014
F#	T#	Location	District/ County	Coord.	Time (UTC)	Path length	Comments/Damage
Russia
F0	T?	Asavdy	Bashkortostan	56.19°N 55.89°E	1050	?	tornado hit Asavdy village; 7 houses slightly damaged

=== June 17 event ===
List of reported tornadoes - Tuesday, June 17, 2014
F#	T#	Location	District/ County	Coord.	Time (UTC)	Path length	Comments/Damage
Montenegro
F0	T?	Ada Bojana	Ulcinj Municipality	41.87°N 19.35°E	0500	?	waterspout came ashore and dealt damage to private houses and restaurants; trees damaged

=== June 18 event ===
List of reported tornadoes - Wednesday, June 18, 2014
F#	T#	Location	District/ County	Coord.	Time (UTC)	Path length	Comments/Damage
Italy
F0	T?	Latina	Lazio	41.46°N 12.90°E	1630	?	Brief touchdown
Italy
F0	T?	Paola	Calabria	39.36°N 16.04°E	1715	1 km	waterspout had landfall; two people injured

=== June 19 event ===
List of reported tornadoes - Thursday, June 19, 2014
F#	T#	Location	District/ County	Coord.	Time (UTC)	Path length	Comments/Damage
Turkey
F?	T?	Körfez	Kocaeli Province	40.77°N 29.77°E	1340	?	Some damage
Turkey
F1	T?	Istanbul	Istanbul Province	40.82°N 29.29°E	1450	?	tornado occurred over water and had landfall over Tuzla settlement area; houses damaged, power poles downed, 15 boats capsized; three people thrown from boats into the sea; no injuries
Russia
F2	T?	Asbest	Sverdlovskaya oblast'	57.01°N 61.45°E	1730	3 km	tornado caused serious damages in Asbest town; 4 people injured

=== June 23 event ===
List of reported tornadoes - Monday, June 23, 2014
F#	T#	Location	District/ County	Coord.	Time (UTC)	Path length	Comments/Damage
France
F0	T?	Authon Ebéon	Poitou-Charentes	45.87°N 0.40°W	1410	0,2 km	Tornado over fields

=== June 25 event ===
List of reported tornadoes - Wednesday, June 25, 2014
F#	T#	Location	District/ County	Coord.	Time (UTC)	Path length	Comments/Damage
France
F0	T?	Coarraze	Aquitaine	43.17°N 0.23°W	1340	?	tornado caused some minor damage in Coarraze village
Serbia
F1	T3	Šopić	Belgrade	43.17°N 0.23°W	1600	?	tornado damage reported in Šopić; houses and cars damaged; few roofs badly damaged; few walls collapsed; truck overturned on the road; large trees uprooted; damage to power lines; no injuries reported

=== June 25 event ===
List of reported tornadoes - Thursday, June 26, 2014
F#	T#	Location	District/ County	Coord.	Time (UTC)	Path length	Comments/Damage
Russia
F0	T?	Izhevsk	Udmurtia	56.83°N 53.12°E	1230	?	andspout-type tornado observed over Izhevsk; roofs damaged

=== June 29 event ===
List of reported tornadoes - Sunday, June 29, 2014
F#	T#	Location	District/ County	Coord.	Time (UTC)	Path length	Comments/Damage
Germany
F1	T3	Halbendorf	Saxony	51.54°N 14.56°E	1405	?	Tents and caravans damaged and forest partly destroyed.

=== June 30 event ===
List of reported tornadoes - Monday, June 30, 2014
F#	T#	Location	District/ County	Coord.	Time (UTC)	Path length	Comments/Damage
United Kingdom
F?	T?	Fareham	England	50.85°N 1.18°W	1015	?	tornado had brief touchdown; cars damaged by flying debris

== July ==
=== July 5 event ===
List of reported tornadoes - Saturday, July 5, 2014
F#	T#	Location	District/ County	Coord.	Time (UTC)	Path length	Comments/Damage
Germany
F1	T2	Tarp	Schleswig-Holstein	54.67°N 9.40°E	1445	1,9 km	tornado hit Tarp village; houses damaged
Turkey
F2	T4	Ardahan	Ardahan Province	41.11°N 42.70°E	1200	?	Roofs torn off, trees uprooted, small debris traces on the walls.

=== July 6 event ===
List of reported tornadoes - Sunday, July 6, 2014
F#	T#	Location	District/ County	Coord.	Time (UTC)	Path length	Comments/Damage
Germany
F1	T2	Homburg	Saarland	49.37°N 7.37°E	1800	0,7 km	Forest area damaged.
Germany
F2	T4	Schönenberg-Kübelberg	Rhineland-Palatinate	49.41°N 7.39°E	1807	0,9 km	roofs destroyed, iron gate smashed and trees damaged

=== July 9 event ===
List of reported tornadoes - Wednesday, July 9, 2014
F#	T#	Location	District/ County	Coord.	Time (UTC)	Path length	Comments/Damage
Bosnia and Herzegovina
F1	T?	Laminci	Republika Srpska	45.10°N 17.34°E	1830	?	7 houses were impacted; damage to roofs and windows, cars damaged, power lines downed; time estimated by radar image

=== July 10 event ===
List of reported tornadoes - Thursday, July 10, 2014
F#	T#	Location	District/ County	Coord.	Time (UTC)	Path length	Comments/Damage
Germany
F?	T?	Morbach	Rhineland-Palatinate	49.82°N 7.12°E	1929	?	tornado observed; damage NW of Morbach

=== July 11 event ===
List of reported tornadoes - Friday, July 11, 2014
F#	T#	Location	District/ County	Coord.	Time (UTC)	Path length	Comments/Damage
Ukraine
F1	T?	Zarvantsy	Vinnyts'ka Oblast'	49.28°N 28.38°E	1300	14 km	houses damaged; forest areas damaged
Ukraine
F1	T?	Stanislavovka	Khmel'nyts'ka Oblast'	49.08°N 27.09°E	1305	3 km	tornado hit Zin'kiv and Stanislavovka villages; houses damaged; vegetation damaged
Ukraine
F1	T?	Okladne	Vinnyts'ka Oblast'	49.04°N 27.65°E	1530	?	tornado hit Okladne and Adamivka villages; 12 houses damaged; trees downed
Romania
F?	T?	Hăneşti	Botoșani County	47.92°N 26.98°E	1600	?	Some damage
Romania
F1	T3	Mangalia	Constanța County	43.80°N 28.58°E	1800	?	tornado reported; roof lifted; trees snapped / downed

=== July 12 event ===
List of reported tornadoes - Saturday, July 12, 2014
F#	T#	Location	District/ County	Coord.	Time (UTC)	Path length	Comments/Damage
Russia
F1	T?	Pionernyy	Tomskaya oblast'	59.16°N 76.07°E	1030	?	tornado hit forest area in Pionernyy area in Kargasokskiy district
Ukraine
F0	T?	Klishkivtsi	Chernivets'ka Oblast'	48.43°N 26.27°E	1300	?	Little damage
Italy
F1	T?	Rovigo	Veneto	45.08°N 11.79°E	1500	0,4 km	2 houses partly unroofed several, other houses damaged; roof tiles blown off; guardrails, fences and traffic signs torn down; gazebos blown away; power and telephone lines damaged; trees uprooted.

=== July 13 event ===
List of reported tornadoes - Sunday, July 13, 2014
F#	T#	Location	District/ County	Coord.	Time (UTC)	Path length	Comments/Damage
Italy
F0	T1	Santa Marinella	Lazio	42.04°N 11.87°E	0130	?	Brief Touchdown with damage to greenhouses and magazines
Italy
F0	T?	Capaccio	Campania	40.42°N 15.08°E	0630	1 km	Damage to sheds, trees and fields
Germany
F0	T?	Oppelshausen	Hesse	50.30°N 8.91°E	1216	?	Damage to roofs and trees

=== July 15 event ===
List of reported tornadoes - Tuesday, July 15, 2014
F#	T#	Location	District/ County	Coord.	Time (UTC)	Path length	Comments/Damage
Russia
F2	T5	Zelënyy Dol	Altai Krai	52.13°N 83.95°E	1040	24,5 km	tornado tracked a longer path over Petropavlobskiy County; houses badly damaged
Russia
F2	T4	Ust'-Sema	Altai Republic	51.65°N 85.76°E	1200	0,8 km	forest area destroyed

=== July 20 event ===
List of reported tornadoes - Sunday, July 20, 2014
F#	T#	Location	District/ County	Coord.	Time (UTC)	Path length	Comments/Damage
Russia
F?	T?	Solënyy	Krasnodar Krai	45.27°N 37.03°E	1030	?	Landspout tornado
France
F1	T?	Saint-Bonnet-près-Riom	Auvergne	45.93°N 3.10°E	1200	0,1 km	brief touch down over fields, damage to crops.

=== July 21 event ===
List of reported tornadoes - Monday, July 21, 2014
F#	T#	Location	District/ County	Coord.	Time (UTC)	Path length	Comments/Damage
Russia
F?	T?	Malyy Utrish	Krasnodar Krai	44.72°N 37.45°E	1000	?	Waterspout with a landfall.
Russia
F1	T?	Anapa	Krasnodar Krai	44.89°N 37.32°E	1600	?	tornado hit Anapa camping site; caravans overthrown
Romania
F?	T?	Ulma	Suceava	47.88°N 25.30°E	2000	?	forest completely ripped off

=== July 22 event ===
List of reported tornadoes - Tuesday, July 22, 2014
F#	T#	Location	District/ County	Coord.	Time (UTC)	Path length	Comments/Damage
Russia
F?	T?	Ozërsk	Chelyabinsk Oblast	55.71°N 60.66°E	1100	?	Landspout tornado
Russia
F?	T?	Pochëtnoye	Crimea	46.01°N 33.77°E	1140	?	Landspout tornado over fields.
Italy
F0	T?	Viterbo	Lazio	42.50°N 12.03°E	1600	1 km	F0 tornado between Viterbo and Montefiascone

=== July 26 event ===
List of reported tornadoes - Saturday, July 26, 2014
F#	T#	Location	District/ County	Coord.	Time (UTC)	Path length	Comments/Damage
Italy
F1	T2	Jesi	Marche	43.51°N 13.26°E	1500	0,6 km	A tornado struck Minonna seriously damaging the roof of a house and damaging 50 others. Several trees were knocked down.

=== July 27 event ===
List of reported tornadoes - Sunday, July 27, 2014
F#	T#	Location	District/ County	Coord.	Time (UTC)	Path length	Comments/Damage
Sweden
F1	T?	Björköby	Jönköpings Län	57.52°N 14.92°E	1500	?	Roof and trees damaged.

=== July 31 event ===
List of reported tornadoes - Thursday, July 31, 2014
F#	T#	Location	District/ County	Coord.	Time (UTC)	Path length	Comments/Damage
Russia
F1	T?	Sadovyy	Amur Oblast	50.35°N 127.57°E	1500	1 km	Houses damaged.

== August ==
=== August 1 event ===
List of reported tornadoes - Friday, August 1, 2014
F#	T#	Location	District/ County	Coord.	Time (UTC)	Path length	Comments/Damage
Sweden
F1	T2	Halmstad	Halland County	56.65°N 12.85°E	0550	?	Several roofs were damaged near the port area.
Latvia
F0	T?	Alande	Liepāja district	56.50°N 21.20°E	1730	?	some minor damage and some trees downed.
Italy
F1	T2	Staffarda	Piemonte	44.72°N 7.44°E	2130	0,4 km	Damage to a corn field just south of the village. Severe damage to some barns and roofs of some houses. Total damage of €1.000.000

=== August 2 event ===
List of reported tornadoes - Saturday, August 2, 2014
F#	T#	Location	District/ County	Coord.	Time (UTC)	Path length	Comments/Damage
Turkey
F1	T?	Kasımpaşa	Istanbul Province	41.03°N 28.97°E	1000	?	Waterspout cause some damages near Istanbul port.
United Kingdom
F1	T2	Wrexham	Denbighshire	53.05°N 3.07°W	1030	?	some minor damage and some trees downed.
United Kingdom
F0	T0	New Ridley	England	54.93°N 1.91°W	1400	?	Damages to homes and cars; some trees were downed.
United Kingdom
F1	T2	Roggel	Limburg	51.26°N 5.92°E	1200	?	Damages to homes and cars; some trees were downed.

=== August 3 event ===
List of reported tornadoes - Sunday, August 3, 2014
F#	T#	Location	District/ County	Coord.	Time (UTC)	Path length	Comments/Damage
Turkey
F?	T?	Çobanlı	Ardahan Province	40.95°N 42.87°E	1600	?	7 Houses damaged.

=== August 29 event ===
List of reported tornadoes - Friday, August 29, 2014
F#	T#	Location	District/ County	Coord.	Time (UTC)	Path length	Comments/Damage
Russia
F3	T6	Yanaul	Yanaulsky District	56.27°N 54.93°E	1300	approx. 100 km (62 mi)	A devastating, long-tracked F3 tornado passed through the northwestern part of Bashkortostan, directly striking Yanaul and neighboring villages like Konigovo. In Yanaul, multiple apartment blocks suffered massive roof destruction, concrete power poles were snapped, and vehicles were tossed and overturned. In Konigovo, 44 out of 47 residential homes were heavily damaged or completely flattened. A total of 2 people were killed, and up to 68 others were injured across the region. The tornado is considered one of the longest-lived tracks in modern Russian history.
