= Sannikovo =

Sannikovo (Russian: Санниково) is the name of several rural localities in Russia:

- Sannikovo, Altai Krai
- Sannikovo, Kovrovsky District, Vladimir Oblast
- Sannikovo, Muromsky District, Vladimir Oblast
- Sannikovo, Vologda Oblast
