= Dushkino =

Dushkino Душкино
- Village
- Location within Vladimir Oblast Location within Russia
- Coordinates: 56°24′N 41°38′E
- Country: Russia
- Region: Vladimir Oblast
- District: Kovrovsky District
- Time zone: UTC+3:00

Dushkino (Russian: Душкино) is a rural locality (a village) in Klyazminskoye Rural Settlement, Kovrovsky District, Vladimir Oblast, Russia. The population was 8 as of 2010.

== Geography ==
Dushkino is located 33 km east of Kovrov (the district's administrative centre) by road. Sannikovo is the nearest rural locality.
