= Asavdy =

Asavdy Асавды
- Village
- Location within Bashkortostan Location within Russia
- Coordinates: 56°11′N 55°53′E
- Country: Russia
- Region: Bashkortostan
- District: Tatyshlinsky District
- Time zone: UTC+5:00

Asavdy (Russian: Асавды; Bashkir: Асауҙы, Asawźı) is a rural locality (a village) in Kalmiyarovsky Selsoviet, Tatyshlinsky District, Bashkortostan, Russia. The population was 110 as of 2010. There are 2 streets.

== Geography ==
Asavdy is located 20 km south of Verkhniye Tatyshly (the district's administrative centre) by road. Savkiyaz is the nearest rural locality.
