= Sannikovo, Vologda Oblast =

Sannikovo Санниково
- Village
- Location within Vologda Oblast Location within Russia
- Coordinates: 58°51′N 38°15′E
- Country: Russia
- Region: Vologda Oblast
- District: Cherepovetsky District
- Time zone: UTC+3:00

Sannikovo (Russian: Санниково) is a rural locality (a village) in Myaksinskoye Rural Settlement, Cherepovetsky District, Vologda Oblast, Russia. The population was 26 as of 2002.

== Geography ==
Sannikovo is located 39 km (24 mi) southeast of Cherepovets (the district's administrative centre) by road. Dobrynskoye is the nearest rural locality.
