= Silly-sur-Nied =

- Commune
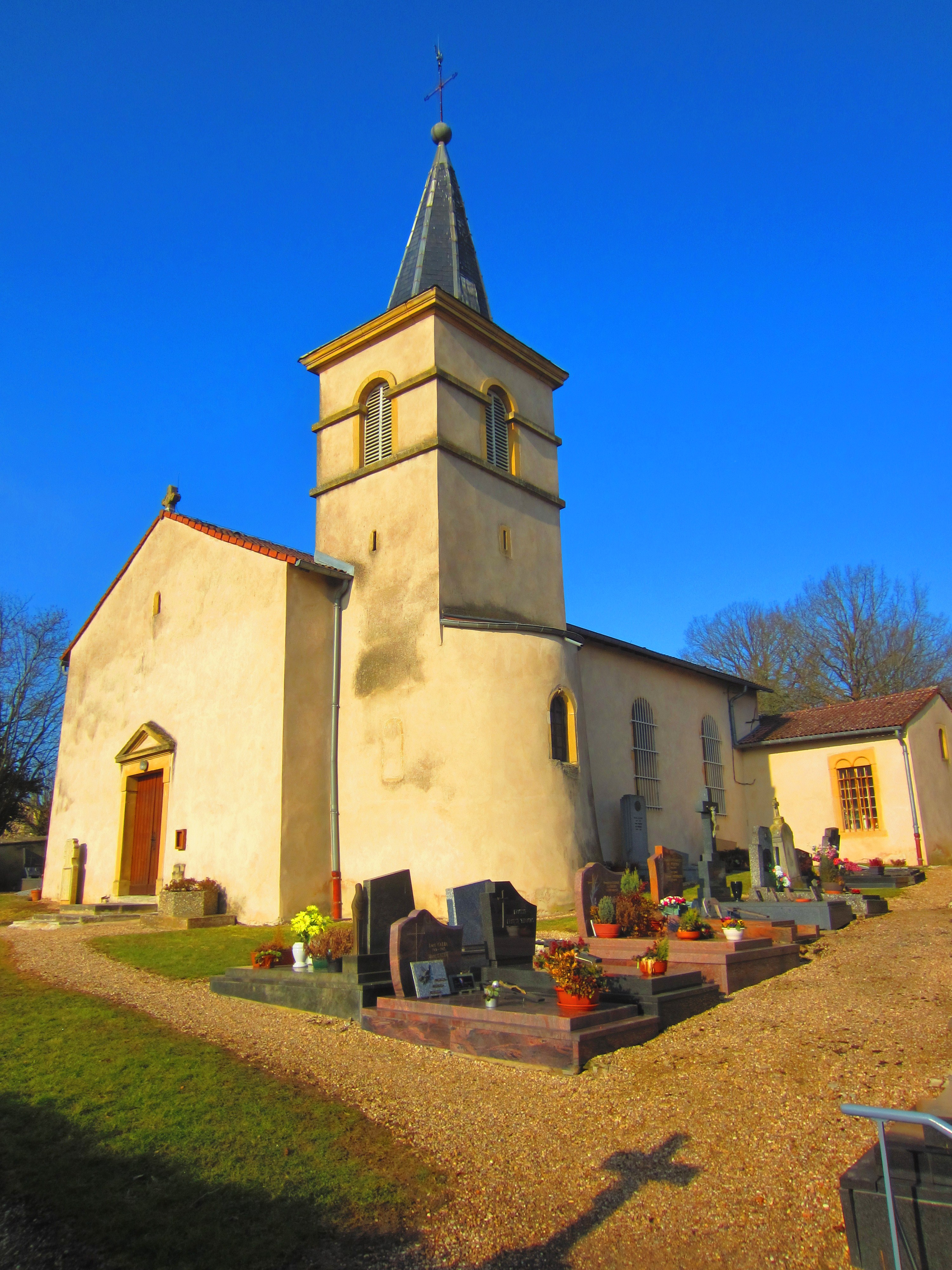
- The church in Silly-sur-Nied

- Coat of arms
- Location of Silly-sur-Nied
- Location within France Location within Grand Est
- Coordinates: 49°07′15″N 6°21′37″E
- Country: France
- Region: Grand Est
- Department: Moselle
- Arrondissement: Metz
- Canton: Le Pays Messin
- Intercommunality: Haut Chemin - Pays de Pange

Government
  - Mayor (2020–2026): Serge Wolljung
- Area^{1}: 4.54 km^{2} (1.75 sq mi)
- Elevation: 250 m (820 ft)
- Highest elevation: 290 m (950 ft)
- Lowest elevation: 210 m (690 ft)
- Population (2023): 719
  - Density: 158/km^{2} (410/sq mi)
- Time zone: UTC+01:00 (CET)
  - Summer (DST): UTC+02:00 (CEST)
- INSEE/Postal code: 57654 /57530
- ^{1} French Land Register data, which excludes lakes, ponds, glaciers > 1 km^{2} (0.386 sq mi or 247 acres) and river estuaries.

Silly-sur-Nied (French pronunciation: [siji syʁ nje], literally Silly on Nied; German: Sillers) is a commune in the Moselle department in Grand Est in north-eastern France.

== See also ==
- Communes of the Moselle department
