= Čedasai =

- Town
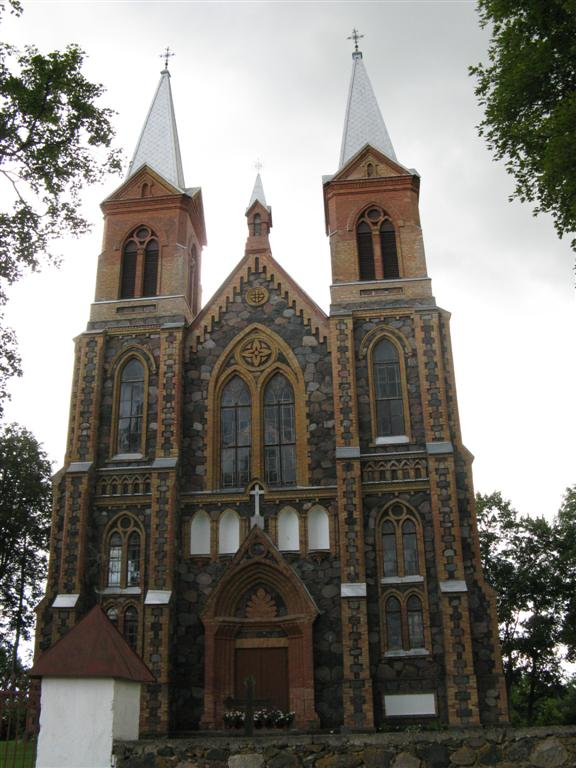

- Location within Lithuania
- Coordinates: 56°06′10″N 25°25′0″E
- Country: Lithuania
- County: Panevėžys County

Population (2011)
  - Total: 196
- Time zone: UTC+2 (EET)
  - Summer (DST): UTC+3 (EEST)

Čedasai is a small town in Panevėžys County, in northeastern Lithuania. According to the 2011 census, the town has a population of 196 people.

== Etymology ==
Čedasai is a hydronymic toponym derived from the name of Lake Čedasas, which is located nearby. In turn, the name of the lake is of Selonian origin (*Ked-asas) and is associated with the words kedenti ('to scatter, to scatter') and kėdarotis ('to branch out untidily'). In other languages the town's name is translated as: Polish: Czadosy.
