= Sergeyevka, Amur Oblast =

Sergeyevka Сергеевка
- Selo
- Location within Amur Oblast Location within Russia
- Coordinates: 50°45′N 127°17′E
- Country: Russia
- Region: Amur Oblast
- District: Blagoveshchensky District
- Time zone: UTC+9:00

Sergeyevka (Russian: Сергеевка) is a rural locality (a selo) and the administrative center of Sergeyevsky Selsoviet of Blagoveshchensky District, Amur Oblast, Russia. The population was 420 as of 2018. There are 8 streets.

== Geography ==
Sergeyevka is located on the left bank of the Amur River, 68 km north of Blagoveshchensk (the district's administrative centre) by road. Bibikovo is the nearest rural locality.
