= Yuldashevo =

Yuldashevo Юлдашево
- Village
- Location within Bashkortostan Location within Russia
- Coordinates: 53°17′N 58°36′E
- Country: Russia
- Region: Bashkortostan
- District: Abzelilovsky District
- Time zone: UTC+5:00

Yuldashevo (Russian: Юлдашево; Bashkir: Юлдаш, Yuldaş) is a rural locality (a village) in Gusevsky Selsoviet, Abzelilovsky District, Bashkortostan, Russia. The population was 340 as of 2010. There are 5 streets.

== Geography ==
Yuldashevo is located 14 km southeast of Askarovo (the district's administrative centre) by road. Askarovo is the nearest rural locality.
