= Sannikovo, Muromsky District, Vladimir Oblast =

Sannikovo Санниково
- Village
- Location within Vladimir Oblast Location within Russia
- Coordinates: 55°40′N 42°00′E
- Country: Russia
- Region: Vladimir Oblast
- District: Muromsky District
- Time zone: UTC+3:00

Sannikovo (Russian: Санниково) is a rural locality (a village) in Borisoglebskoye Rural Settlement, Muromsky District, Vladimir Oblast, Russia. The population was 58 as of 2010. There are 3 streets.

== Geography ==
Sannikovo is located 13 km north of Murom (the district's administrative centre) by road. Stepankovo is the nearest rural locality.
