= Volkovoyno =

Volkovoyno Волковойно
- Village
- Location within Vladimir Oblast Location within Russia
- Coordinates: 56°19′N 41°00′E
- Country: Russia
- Region: Vladimir Oblast
- District: Kameshkovsky District
- Time zone: UTC+3:00

Volkovoyno (Russian: Волковойно) is a rural locality (a village) in Vtorovskoye Rural Settlement, Kameshkovsky District, Vladimir Oblast, Russia. The population was 552 as of 2010. There are 2 streets.

== Geography ==
Volkovoyno is located 5 km south of Kameshkovo (the district's administrative centre) by road. Kameshkovo is the nearest rural locality.
