= Selezni =

Selezni Селезни
- Village
- Location within Perm Krai Location within Russia
- Coordinates: 57°35′N 57°30′E
- Country: Russia
- Region: Perm Krai
- District: Beryozovsky District
- Time zone: UTC+5:00

Selezni (Russian: Селезни) is a rural locality (a village) in Klyapovskoye Rural Settlement, Beryozovsky District, Perm Krai, Russia. The population was 9 as of 2010.

== Geography ==
Selezni is located 15 km east of Beryozovka (the district's administrative centre) by road. Galashino is the nearest rural locality.
