= Sannikovo, Altai Krai =

Sannikovo Санниково
- Selo
- Location within Altai Krai Location within Russia
- Coordinates: 53°20′N 83°58′E
- Country: Russia
- Region: Altai Krai
- District: Pervomaysky District
- Time zone: UTC+7:00

Sannikovo (Russian: Санниково) is a rural locality (a selo) and the administrative center of Sannikovsky Selsoviet, Pervomaysky District, Altai Krai, Russia. The population was 2,720 as of 2013. There are 101 streets.

== Geography ==
Sannikovo is located 12 km south of Novoaltaysk (the district's administrative centre) by road. Firsovo-3 is the nearest rural locality.
