= Beykonak, Kumluca =

Beykonak
- Neighbourhood
- Location in Turkey
- Coordinates: 36.3257°N 30.3030°E
- Country: Turkey
- Province: Antalya
- District: Kumluca
- Population (2022): 5,239
- Time zone: UTC+3 (TRT)

Beykonak is a neighbourhood in the municipality and district of Kumluca, Antalya Province, Turkey. Its population is 5,239 (2022). Before the 2013 reorganisation, it was a town (belde).
