= Sannikovo, Kovrovsky District, Vladimir Oblast =

Sannikovo Санниково
- Selo
- Location within Vladimir Oblast Location within Russia
- Coordinates: 56°24′N 41°39′E
- Country: Russia
- Region: Vladimir Oblast
- District: Kovrovsky District
- Time zone: UTC+3:00

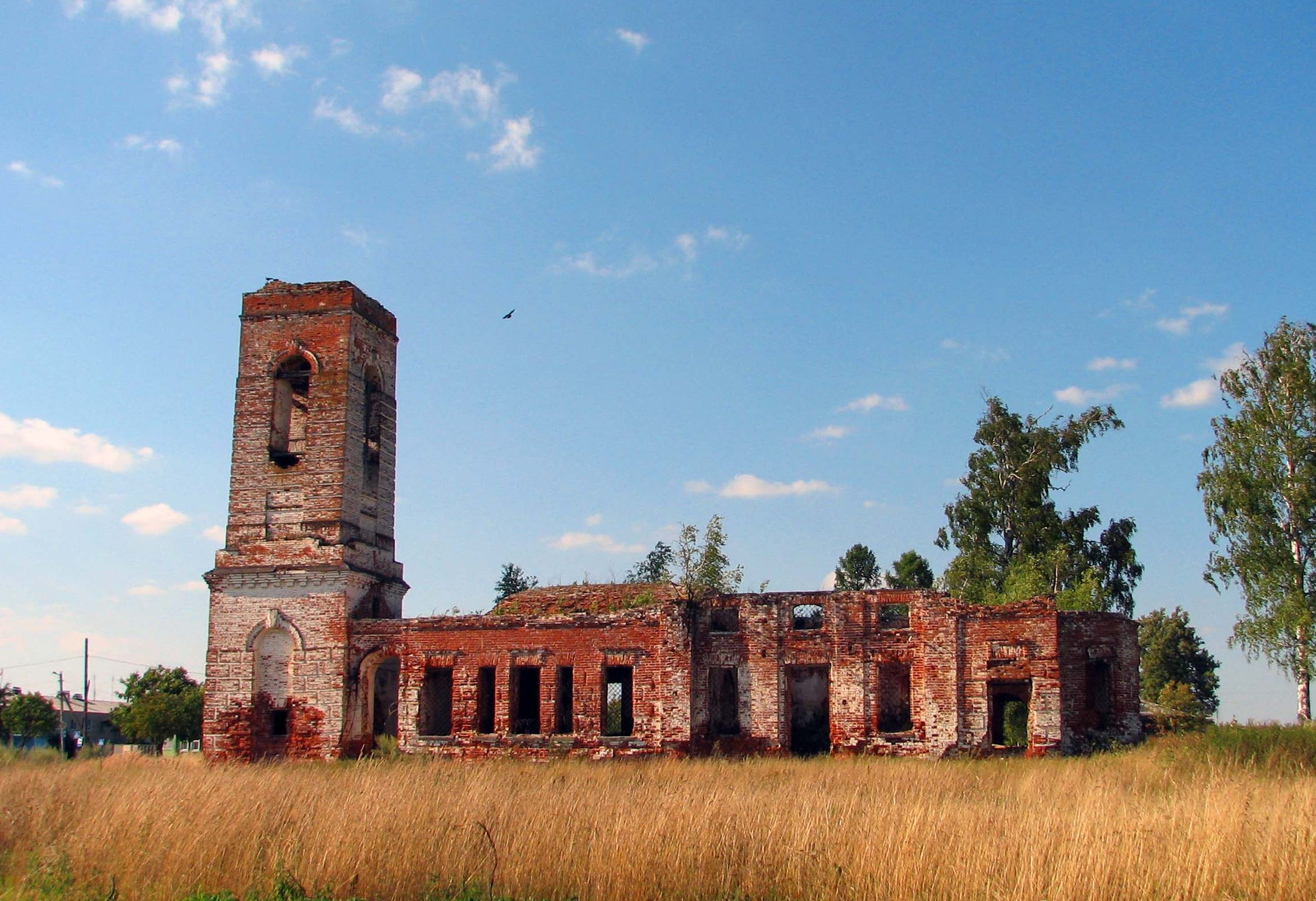
Church of the Holy Trinity, Village of Sannikovo

Sannikovo (Russian: Санниково) is a rural locality (a selo) in Klyazminskoye Rural Settlement, Kovrovsky District, Vladimir Oblast, Russia. The population was 352 as of 2010. There are 3 streets.

== Geography ==
Sannikovo is located 32 km northeast of Kovrov (the district's administrative centre) by road. Dushkino is the nearest rural locality.
