= Golubitsky =

Golubitsky or Golubitskiy (Ukrainian: Голубицький, Russian: Голубицкий) is a Slavic masculine surname, its feminine counterpart is Golubitskaya or Goloubitskaia. It may refer to

- Marty Golubitsky (born 1945), American mathematician
- Pavel Golubitsky (1845–1911), Russian telephony engineer
- Sergei Golubitsky (born 1969), Ukrainian fencer
- Sergey Golubitskiy (born 1962), Russian linguist, writer, journalist and financial analyst
- Alexandra Goloubitskaia (born 1980), pianist and music teacher, living in Austria.
