= Tornadoes of 2020 =

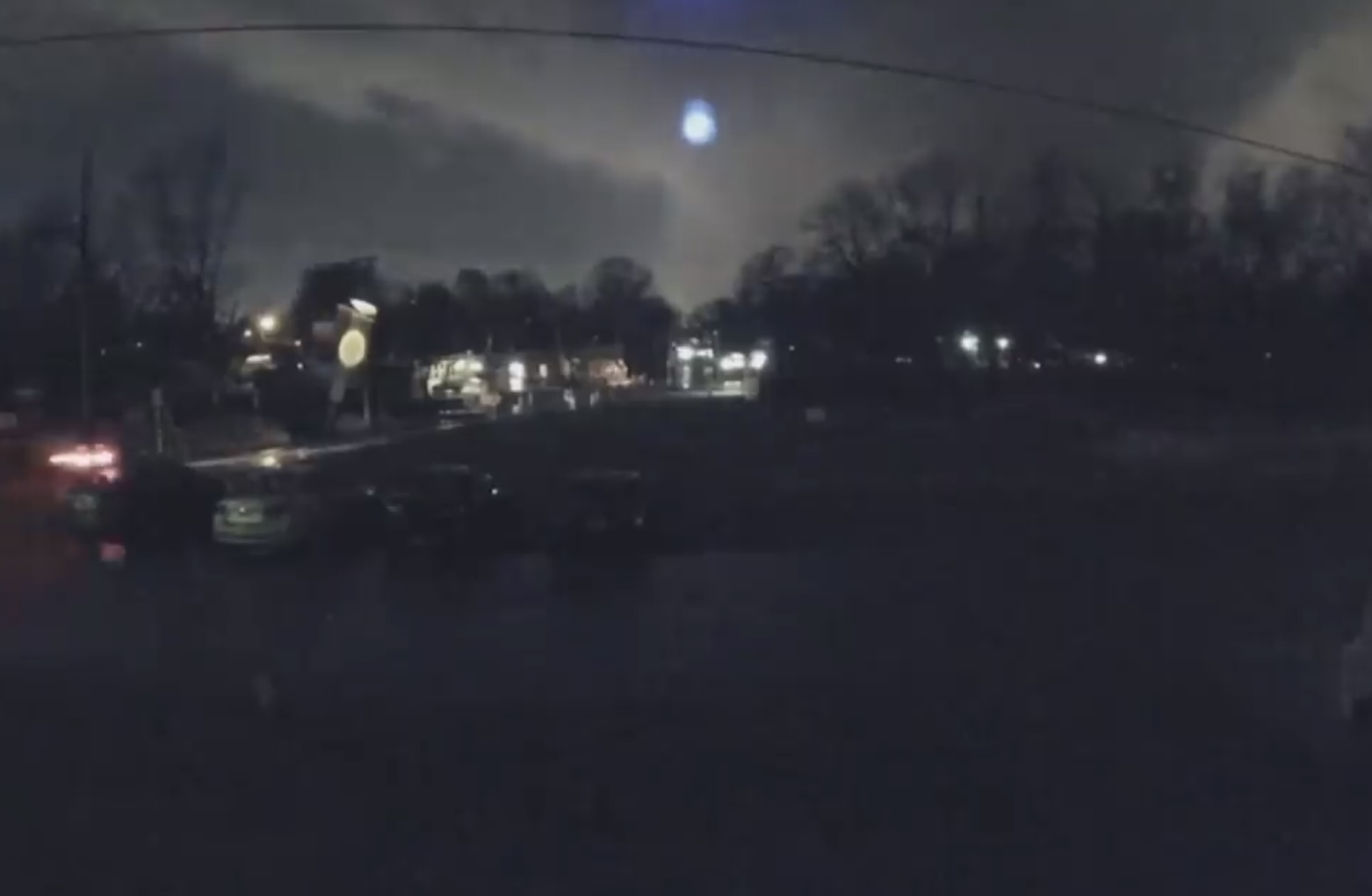
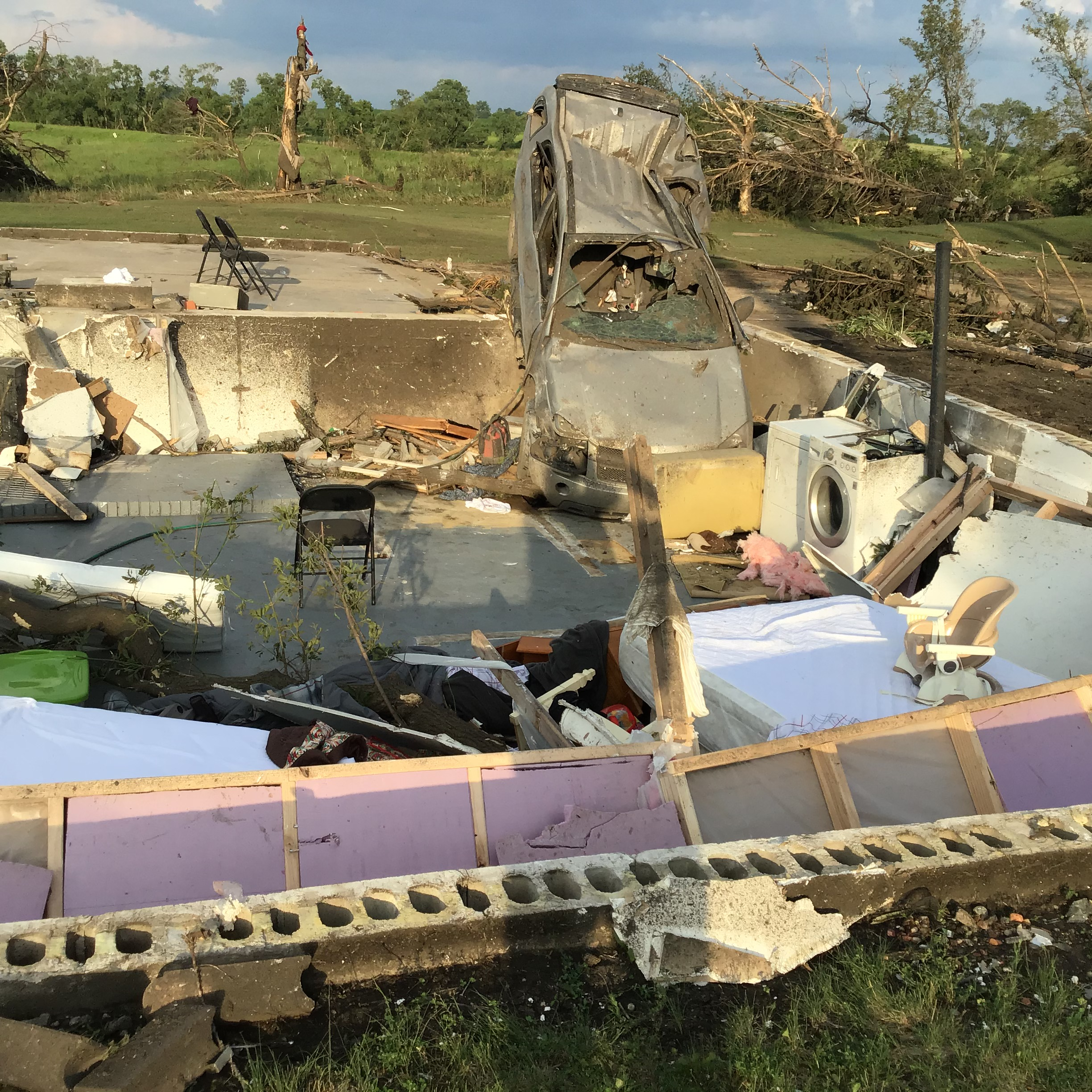
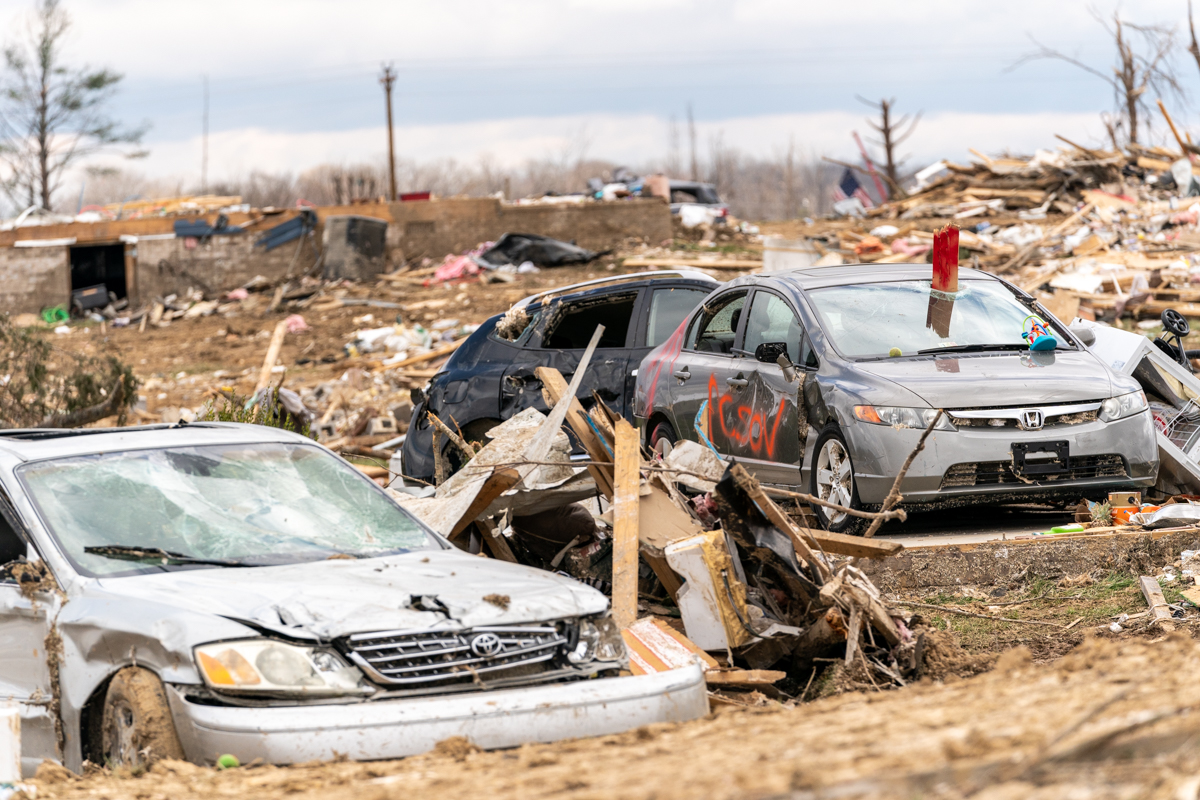
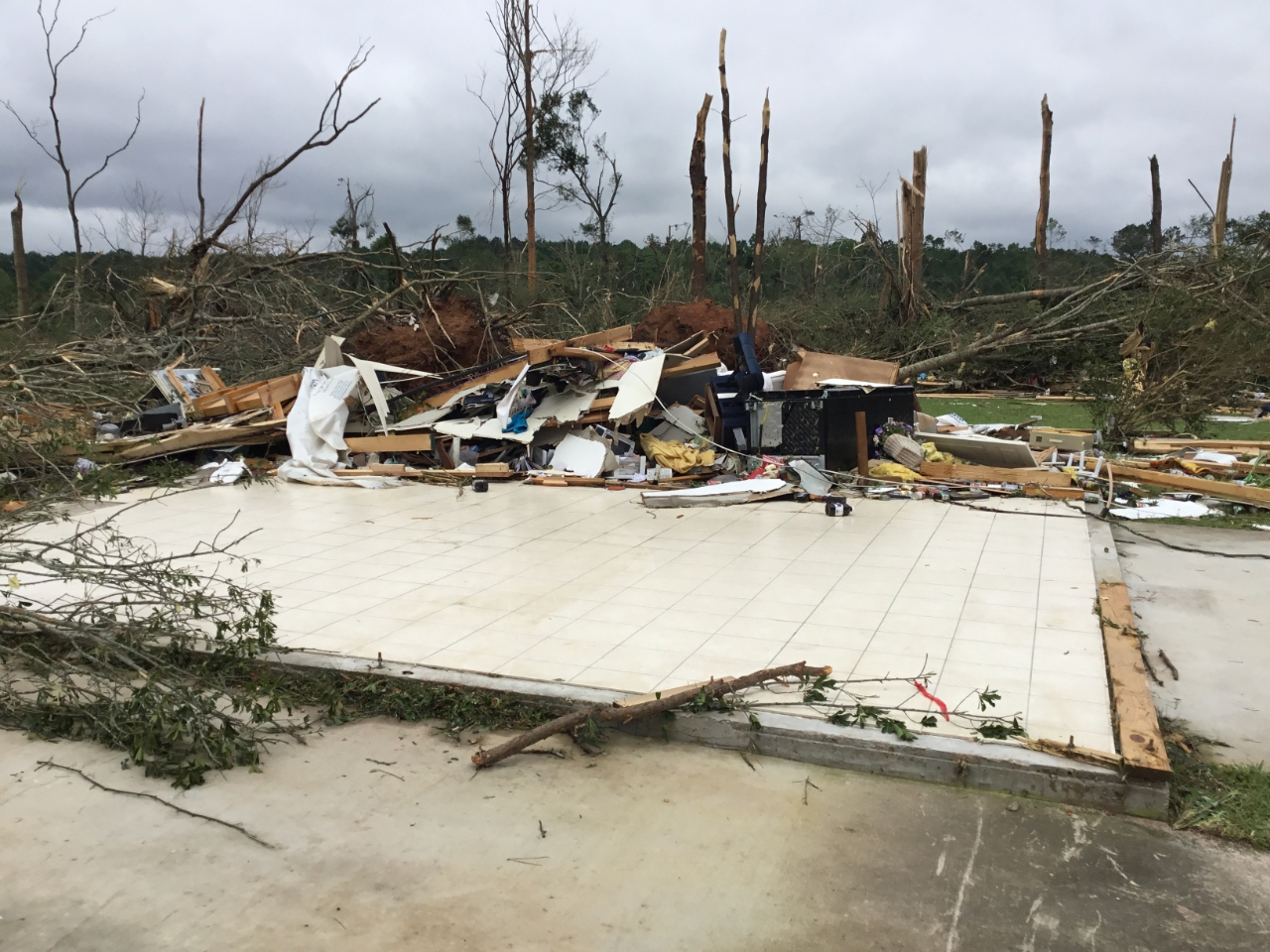
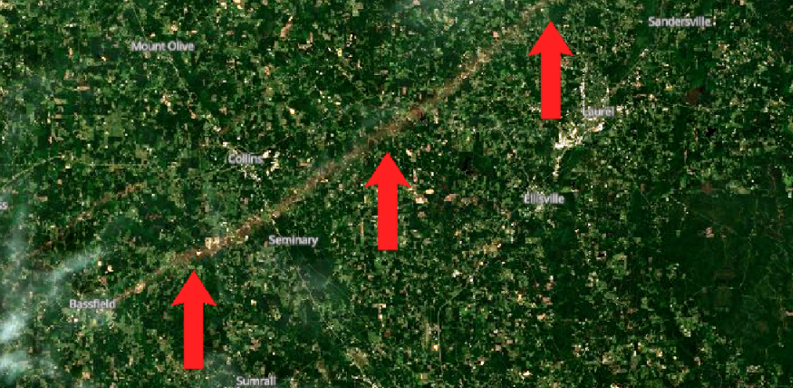
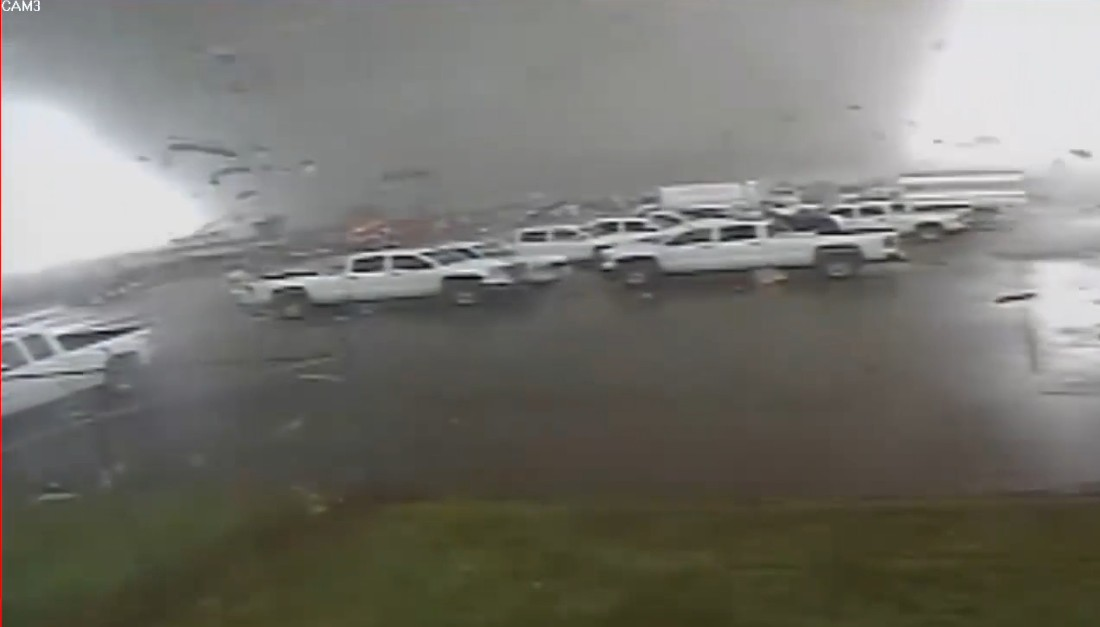
- Clockwise from top: A destructive EF3 tornado in Nashville, Tennessee on March 3; Damaged vehicles following the EF4 Cookeville tornado on March 3; The tornado scar caused by a 2.25 mile wide EF4 tornado on April 12; A CCTV still of an EF3 tornado in Jonesboro, Arkansas on March 28; EF4 damage to a house near Sandy Hook, Mississippi from a tornado on April 19; EF4 damage to a house near Ashby, Minnesota following a tornado on July 8.
- Timespan: January 3 – December 30
- Maximum rated tornado: EF4 tornado: List; Cookeville, Tennessee on March 3; Sartinville, Mississippi on April 12; Bassfield–Soso, Mississippi on April 12; Estill, South Carolina on April 13; Sandy Hook, Mississippi on April 19; Ashby, Minnesota on July 8
- Tornadoes in U.S.: 1,086
- Damage (U.S.): >$4.4 billion
- Fatalities (U.S.): 78
- Fatalities (worldwide): 94

This page documents notable tornadoes and tornado outbreaks worldwide in 2020. Strong and destructive tornadoes form most frequently in the United States, Argentina, Brazil, Bangladesh, and eastern India, but can occur almost anywhere under the right conditions. Tornadoes also develop occasionally in southern Canada during the Northern Hemisphere's summer and somewhat regularly at other times of the year across Europe, Asia, Argentina, Australia and New Zealand. Tornadic events are often accompanied by other forms of severe weather, including strong thunderstorms, strong winds, and hail. There were 1,243 preliminary filtered reported tornadoes in 2020 in the United States in 2020, and 1,086 confirmed tornadoes in the United States in 2020. Worldwide, at least 94 tornado-related deaths were confirmed with 78 in the United States, eight in Vietnam, two each in Canada, Indonesia, and Mexico, and one each in South Africa and China.

Although 2020 was the deadliest year for tornado related fatalities in the United States (primarily in the South due to significant tornado outbreaks in March and April) since 2011, the tornado season also ended up being the least active year in terms of the number of confirmed tornadoes since 2016 and before 2022, primarily due to six of the final eight months being significantly below average. Despite this, August set a new monthly record for tornadoes, with 182.

== Events ==
=== United States ===
There were 1,243 reported tornadoes and 1,086 confirmed tornadoes in the United States in 2020.

Confirmed tornadoes by Enhanced Fujita rating
EFU	EF0	EF1	EF2	EF3	EF4	EF5	Total
109	443	421	89	18	6	0	1,086

A map of 2020 United States tornado paths from the results of storm surveys.

A chart of the 2020 United States tornado count estimated from the number of preliminary reports.

Fatal United States tornadoes in 2020
- Approximate touchdown location of deadly tornadoes in 2020 Summary of tornadoes: January 10 – Texas (1 death); January 11 – Louisiana (3 deaths); January 11 – Alabama (3 deaths); February 6 – Alabama (1 death); March 2 – Tennessee (1 death); March 3 – Tennessee (5 deaths); March 3 – Tennessee (19 deaths); April 12 – Mississippi (4 deaths); April 12 – Mississippi (8 deaths); April 12 – Georgia (8 deaths); April 12 – Tennessee (2 deaths); April 13 – Georgia (1 death); April 13 – South Carolina (1 death); April 13 – South Carolina (2 deaths); April 13 – South Carolina (5 deaths); April 13 – South Carolina (1 death); April 19 – Mississippi (1 death); April 19 – Alabama (1 death); April 22 – Oklahoma (2 deaths); April 22 – Texas (3 deaths); April 22 – Louisiana (1 death); May 17 – Louisiana (1 death); July 8 – Minnesota (1 death); August 4 – North Carolina (2 deaths); August 30 – South Dakota (1 death); Total fatalities: 78

== January ==
=== January 3 (South Africa) ===
On January 3, severe thunderstorms developed over the Mpumalanga province of South Africa. One thunderstorm developed into a supercell which produced an EF3 tornado that caused significant damage to a farm, destroyed the houses of seven families, and destroyed about 200 hectares (500 acres) of pine forest.

=== January 10–11 (United States) ===
EFU	EF0	EF1	EF2	EF3	EF4	EF5
1	25	41	13	0	0	0

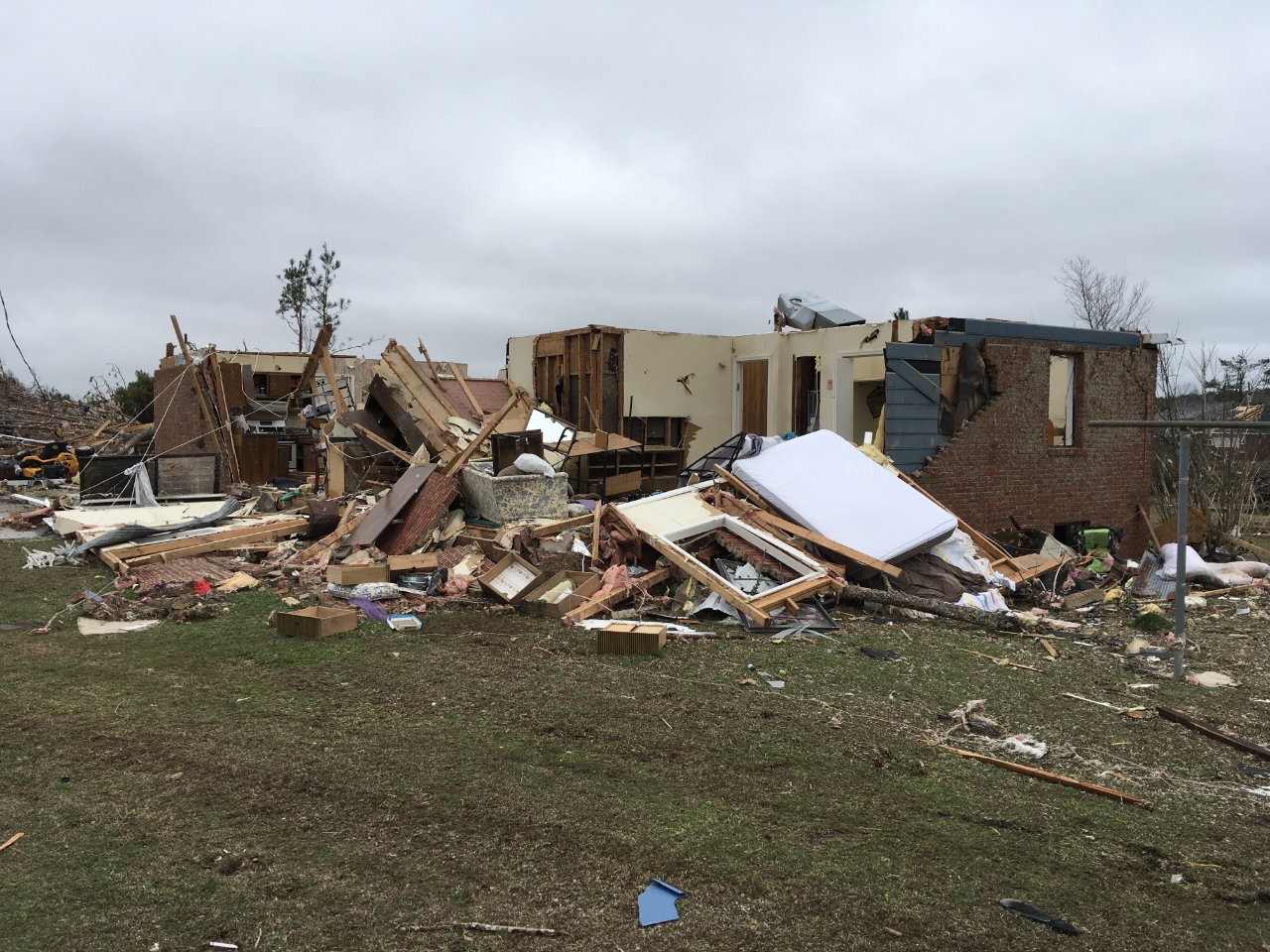
High-end EF2 damage to a house near Carrollton, Alabama.

On January 10, the Storm Prediction Center issued a moderate risk of severe weather for much of the Southern United States, including a 15% hatched risk of tornadoes. A squall line of severe thunderstorms with numerous embedded circulations and semi-discrete supercell structures moved from Texas and Oklahoma to the East Coast, producing numerous tornadoes. An EF1 tornado killed one person near Nacogdoches, Texas, when a large tree fell onto a mobile home and three people were fatally injured when a long-tracked EF2 tornado destroyed two mobile homes south of Haughton, Louisiana. An EF2 tornado struck Rome, Mississippi, causing significant damage and destroying the local post office. A high-end EF2 tornado near Carrollton, Alabama, destroyed multiple homes and mobile homes, and resulted in three fatalities. An EF2 tornado also struck Union Grove, Alabama, significantly damaging a school building in the community. Another school also sustained major damage near Kershaw, South Carolina, as a result of another EF2 tornado. Overall, this outbreak produced a total of 80 tornadoes, and resulted in seven fatalities. Total damage from the event reached $1.1 billion according to the National Centers for Environmental Information.

== February ==
=== February 5–7 (United States) ===
EFU	EF0	EF1	EF2	EF3	EF4	EF5
0	9	21	7	0	0	0

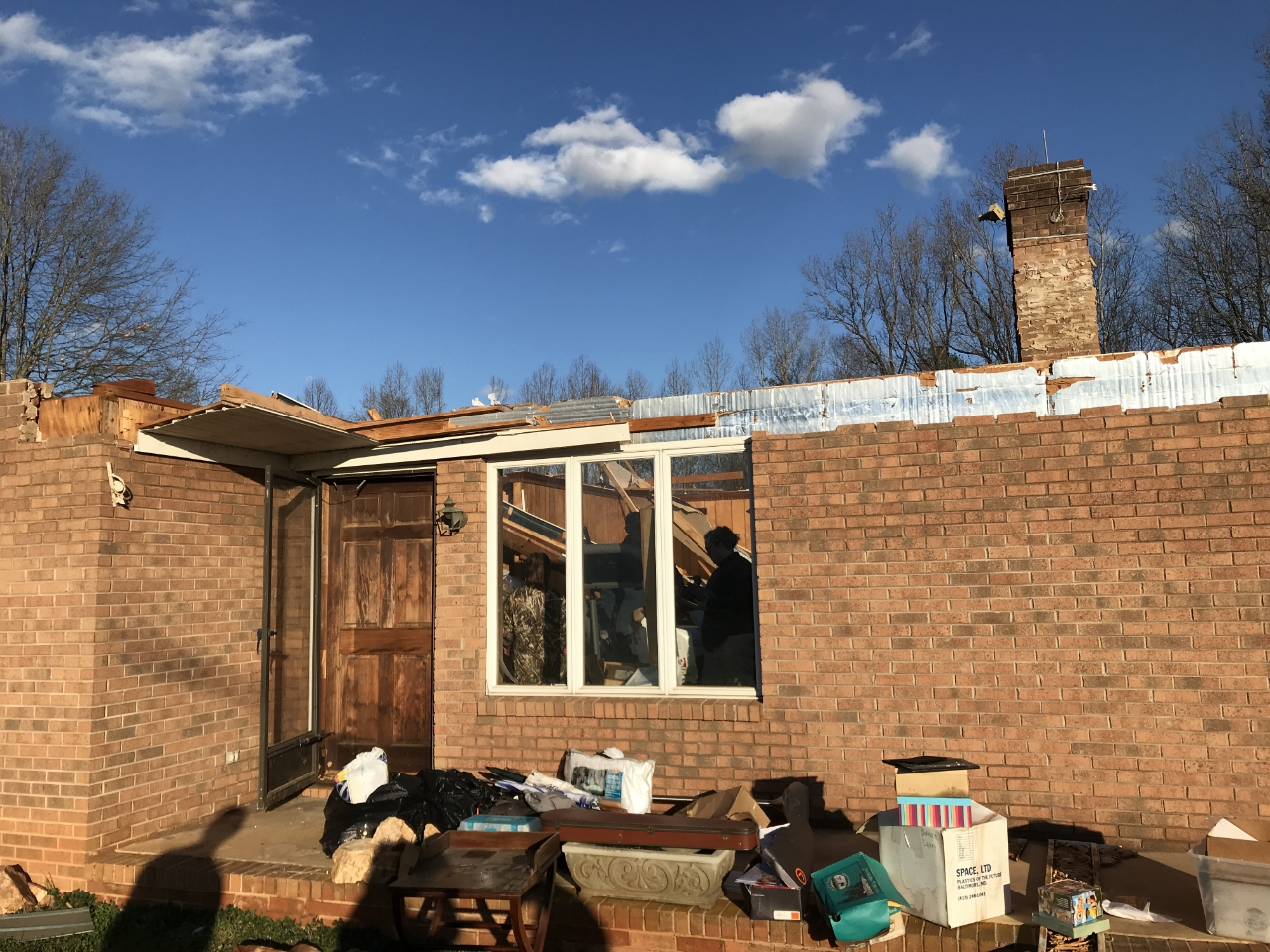
EF2 damage to a house near Kannapolis, North Carolina.

Beginning on February 5, a moderate tornado outbreak affected the Deep South and Eastern United States. On the first day of the outbreak, an EF2 tornado caused significant tree and outbuilding damage near Pickens, Mississippi, and injured four people. A long-tracked EF2 tornado touched down near Bay Springs, Mississippi, and passed through the town of Enterprise, downing numerous trees and power poles and toppling a metal fire tower. This tornado tore large sections of roofing off of multiple homes in rural areas as well. On February 6, one person was killed in Marengo County, Alabama, when an EF1 tornado destroyed a mobile home near Demopolis. An EF2 tornado also touched down near Kannapolis, North Carolina, to the north of Charlotte. No injuries were reported, though multiple homes were damaged, including one that lost its roof and some exterior walls. Another EF2 tornado downed metal truss transmission towers near Kings Mountain, and an EF1 tornado caused damage in the southern suburbs of Charlotte. A high-end EF1 tornado moved directly through Spartanburg, South Carolina, as well, causing considerable damage to homes and businesses. On February 7, five tornadoes unexpectedly touched down in Maryland, including an EF1 that struck Westminster and Manchester, causing moderate damage. An EF0 tornado also caused minor damage in Leesburg, Virginia. Along with the tornadic storms, heavy rainfall resulted in widespread flooding also occurred throughout the southern states. Total economic losses from the event exceeded $925 million. Overall, this outbreak produced a total of 37 tornadoes, and resulted in one fatality.

== March ==
=== March 2–3 (United States) ===
EFU	EF0	EF1	EF2	EF3	EF4	EF5
0	6	3	4	1	1	0

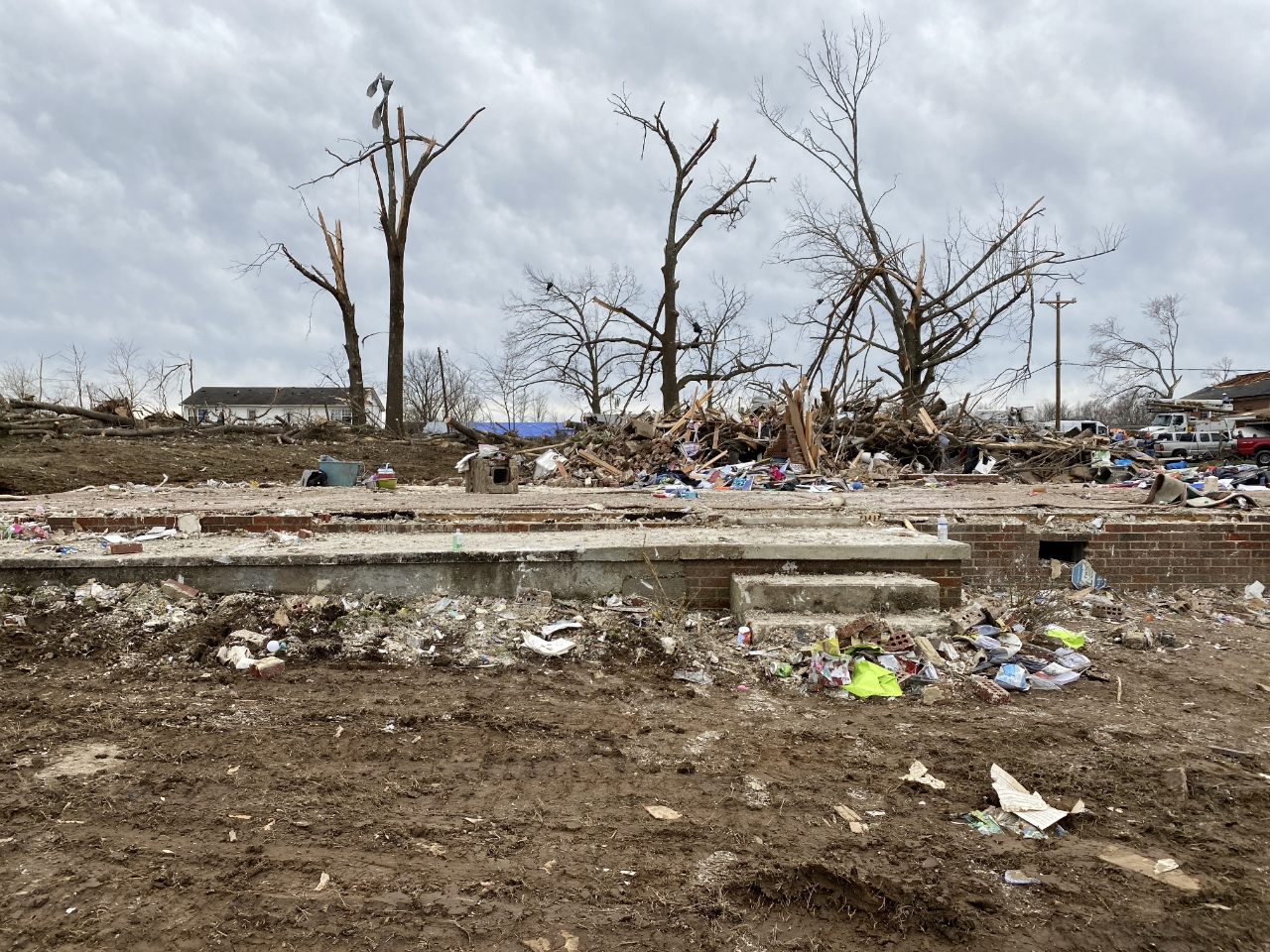
A well-anchored home swept away at low-end EF4 intensity in Cookeville.

A small but devastating tornado outbreak affected parts of the Southern United States on the evening of March 2 into the early morning hours of March 3, with a lone, long-tracked supercell thunderstorm being responsible for ten tornadoes in Tennessee as it moved from near Dyersburg in West Tennessee to near Knoxville in East Tennessee. The most severe damage and all the fatalities occurred in Tennessee, although other damaging tornadoes were reported Missouri, Alabama and Kentucky. The first fatal tornado outbreak occurred on the night of March 2, when an EF2 tornado killed one person and caused significant damage to homes, mobile homes, and outbuildings near Camden, Tennessee. Later, another EF2 tornado downed numerous trees and damaged homes and outbuildings near Alvaton, Kentucky. The north side of Nashville, Tennessee, was directly struck by a long-tracked, high-end EF3 tornado just after 12:30 a.m. CDT on March 3. Major structural damage and five fatalities occurred as the tornado passed just north of downtown Nashville and through Mount Juliet to the east. Damage estimates of $1.504 billion made this the 6th costliest tornado in US history. Later, another EF2 tornado caused heavy damage Clarkrange, Tennessee. The deadliest tornado of the outbreak occurred in Putnam County, where an EF4 tornado, the first violent tornado of the year, touched down near Baxter shortly before 2:00 a.m. and moved into Cookeville. Many homes and other buildings were completely leveled or swept away in residential areas of Western Cookeville with 19 people being killed in the area. Overall, this outbreak produced a total of 15 tornadoes, resulted in 25 tornado-related fatalities, and caused $1.606 billion (2020 USD) in damage.

=== March 3–4 (Vietnam) ===
An outbreak of severe thunderstorms and tornadoes struck seven provinces in Vietnam with at least one fatality being reported as tornado-related. The severe weather outbreak as a whole left five people dead, over 350 homes destroyed, and 6,800 others damaged.

=== March 18–19 (United States) ===
EFU	EF0	EF1	EF2	EF3	EF4	EF5
0	5	11	5	0	0	0

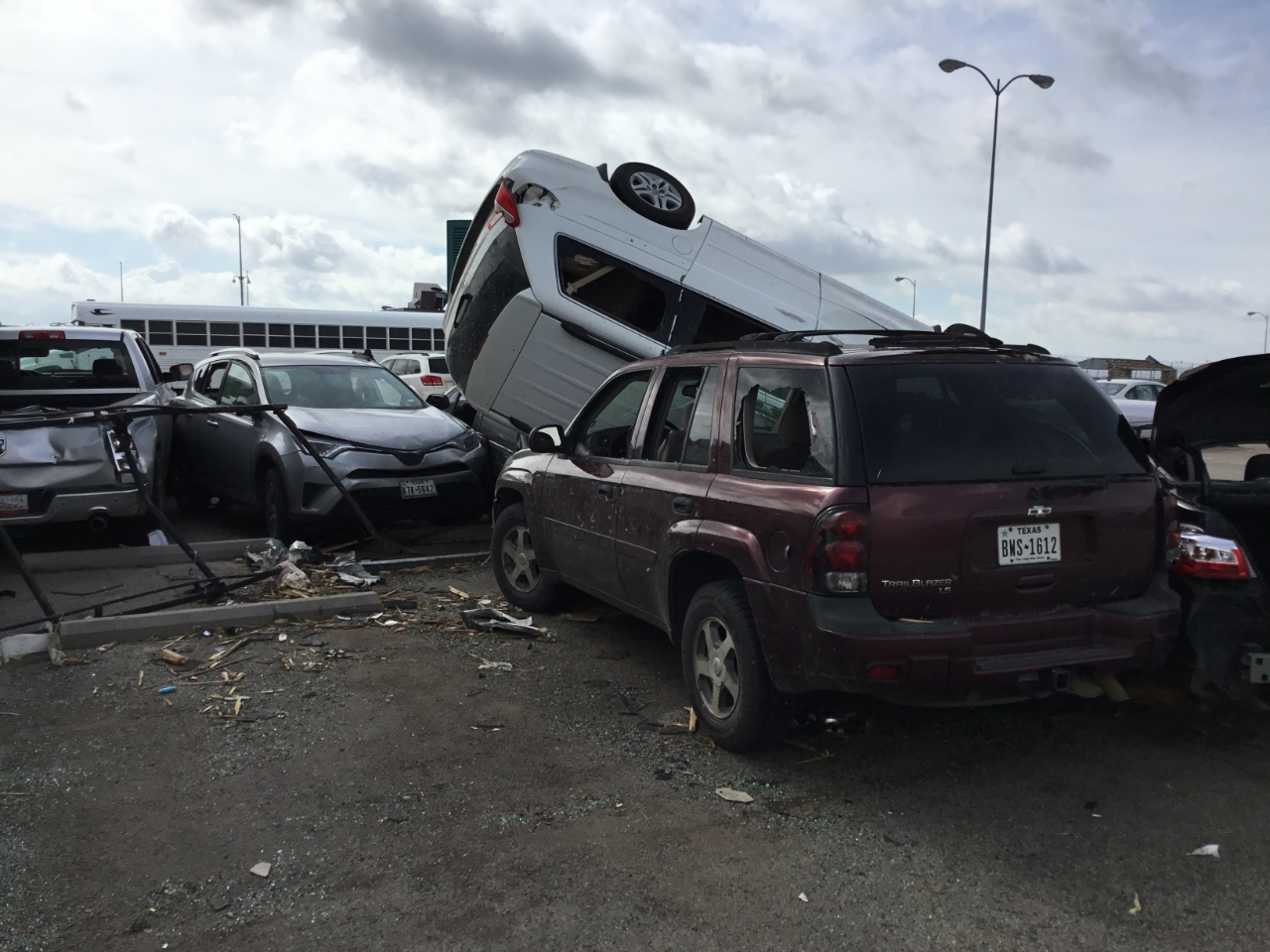
Vehicles flipped and damaged by an EF2 tornado at a correctional facility near Abilene, Texas.

On March 18, an intense supercell thunderstorm spawned numerous weak tornadoes as it tracked through Jack, Stephens, Wise, and Young counties in Texas. With severe storms continuing into the early morning hours of March 19, two EF2 tornadoes caused considerable damage to trees, vehicles, farming equipment, and outbuildings near Trent, Texas. The thunderstorm responsible for those tornadoes went on to produce another EF2 tornado that damaged a large building and over 100 cars at a correctional facility northeast of Abilene. Near Sweetwater, an EF2 tornado damaged or destroyed several wind turbines. Later that day, a large portion of the southern Great Plains was in line for severe storms, along with parts of the Ohio Valley. During the afternoon, a squall line with several embedded supercells formed from Oklahoma to Indiana, producing tornadoes in Oklahoma, Illinois, and Arkansas. A large EF2 tornado touched down near Everton, Arkansas, before moving through the southeastern part of town, causing significant damage to homes, a school, outbuildings, and trees. Three EF1 tornadoes also touched down in Arkansas, one of which tracked between Gassville and Mountain Home, inflicting considerable damage to some homes. Further north, two EF1 tornadoes caused damage in Sunfield and Dahlgren, Illinois. One person was injured in Illinois, and another injury occurred in Arkansas. A total of 21 tornadoes were confirmed.

=== March 28–29 (United States) ===
EFU	EF0	EF1	EF2	EF3	EF4	EF5
4	4	11	2	1	0	0

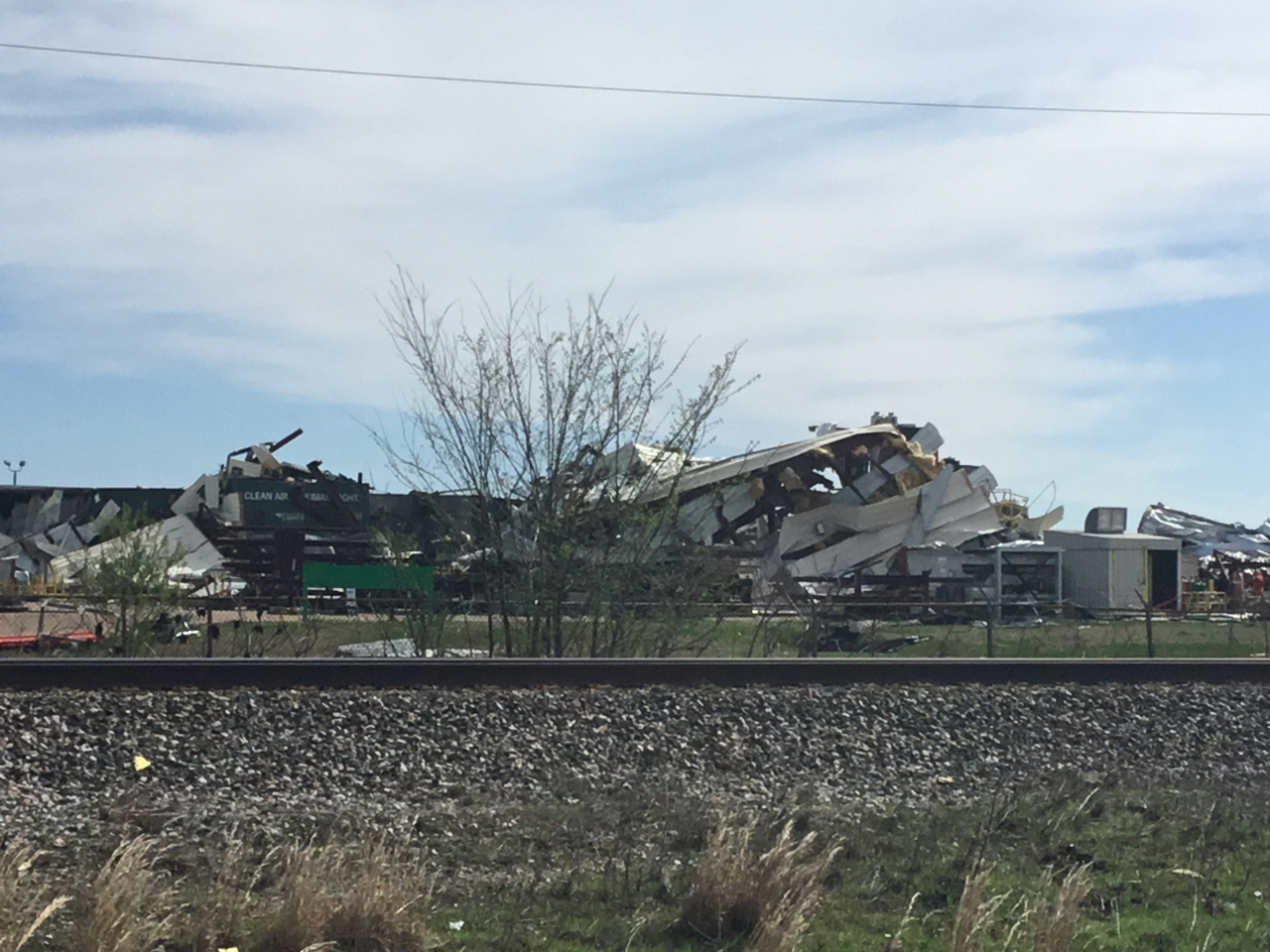
EF3 tornado damage to metal warehouse buildings at the Jonesboro Municipal Airport.

On March 28, the SPC issued a moderate risk of severe weather for much of Illinois, including a 15% hatched risk of tornadoes. An enhanced risk of severe weather was in place across parts of Iowa, Missouri, Indiana, and Arkansas as well. At 2:40 p.m. CDT on March 28, a Particularly Dangerous Situation Tornado Watch was issued by the Storm Prediction Center across central and eastern Iowa, central and northern Illinois, and northeastern Missouri. Only weak tornadoes touched down in the moderate risk area, though a few strong tornadoes occurred elsewhere. A large EF3 tornado struck the city of Jonesboro, Arkansas, while being streamed live on local news stations, producing major damage to homes, businesses, and a shopping mall. Vehicles were thrown and mangled, and the Jonesboro Municipal Airport sustained severe damage as well. A train was also derailed, and 22 injuries occurred in Jonesboro. The tornado also caused $300 million in damages. The same storm that produced this tornado also produced two EF1 tornadoes, one before and one after it moved over Jonesboro. Into the evening, numerous weak tornadoes touched down in Iowa and Illinois, and another in southwest Wisconsin. This included an EF1 tornado that caused moderate damage to apartment buildings and trees in Oelwein, Iowa, indirectly injuring one person. A low-end EF2 tornado touched down in Corydon, Kentucky, moved through the southern fringes of Henderson, destroying numerous outbuildings and a barn, snapping power poles, and damaging dozens of homes and trees. Another EF2 tornado struck the town of Newburgh, Indiana, where five homes sustained partial to total roof removal, and one home had a few upper floor exterior walls ripped off. Numerous other homes in town sustained less severe damage, and two people were injured in Newburgh. An EF1 tornado also caused roof and tree damage in Peoria, Illinois, as well. Early in the morning of March 29, the same storm system produced an EF0 tornado that mainly damaged trees near Sparta, Tennessee. Overall, this outbreak produced 22 tornadoes. Flooding from this storm system caused a trail closure at Cuyahoga Valley National Park.

=== March 30–31 (United States) ===
EFU	EF0	EF1	EF2	EF3	EF4	EF5
1	9	3	1	0	0	0

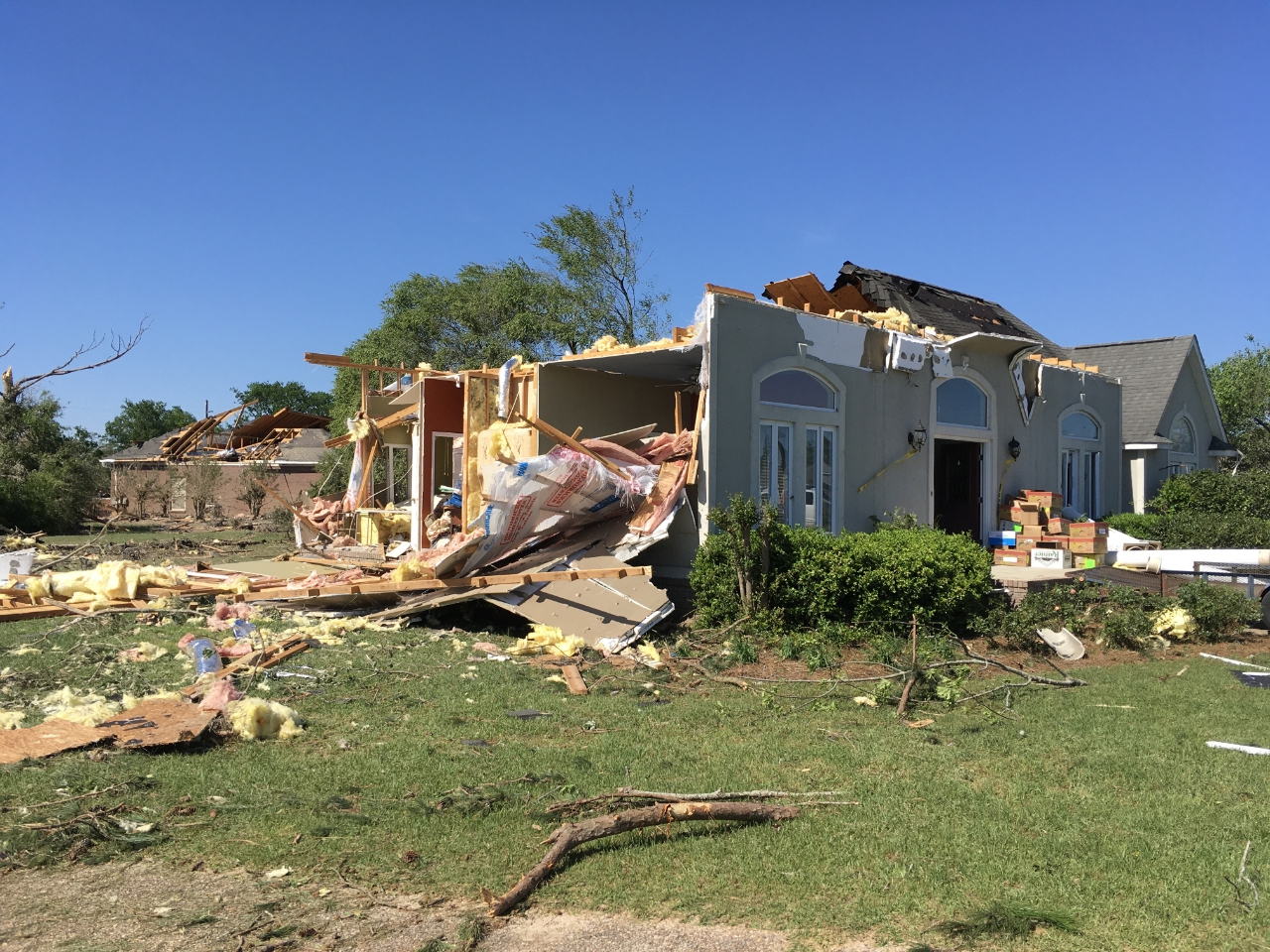
High-end EF2 damage to a home south of Eufaula, Alabama.

On the evening of March 30, isolated supercells developed across Texas and Oklahoma, producing two weak tornadoes. One of these was given an EFU rating, and the other, which was a landspout or non-mesocylonic tornado, was given an EF0 rating. On March 31, multiple supercells and embedded mesocyclones formed along and just ahead of a convective line, producing several tornadoes across parts of the Southeastern United States. A high-end EF2 tornado caused significant damage south of Eufaula, Alabama, where multiple homes in a subdivision had their roofs torn off. A few of these homes sustained partial exterior wall loss. Multiple other weak tornadoes were confirmed in southeast Mississippi, southern Alabama, and northern Florida. In all, 14 tornadoes were confirmed.

== April ==
=== April 7–9 (United States) ===
EFU	EF0	EF1	EF2	EF3	EF4	EF5
0	20	10	1	0	0	0

A few weak tornadoes touched down across Ohio and Pennsylvania late on April 7 and into the early morning of April 8, causing tree and structure damage. Shortly after 11:30 pm on April 7, an EF1 tornado touched down near Grafton, Ohio, and tracked through the town of Medina. Moderate tree damage and minor structural damage occurred as the tornado tracked just south of Medina's historic square. On the night of April 8, a large cone EF2 tornado touched down near Weiner, Arkansas, completely destroying a mobile home. The tornado then struck Harrisburg, Arkansas, in Poinsett County. In Harrisburg, one frail home was completely leveled by the tornado, and several homes nearby were also badly damaged or destroyed in residential areas of town. Extensive tree damage occurred and two people were injured in Harrisburg. Numerous tornadoes, all of which weak and short-lived, occurred across Indiana, Kentucky, and Ohio that night as well. One EF1 tornado caused considerable damage to a brick building in downtown Mooresville, Indiana. Another EF1 tornado damaged two mobile homes, a garage, and trees near Wilkesville, Ohio, on April 9 before the outbreak came to an end. Numerous reports of damaging straight line winds were also received throughout the event, including the 2nd highest thunderstorm wind gust in Pittsburgh. A total of 31 tornadoes were confirmed.

=== April 12–13 (United States) ===
EFU	EF0	EF1	EF2	EF3	EF4	EF5
0	32	74	19	13	3	0

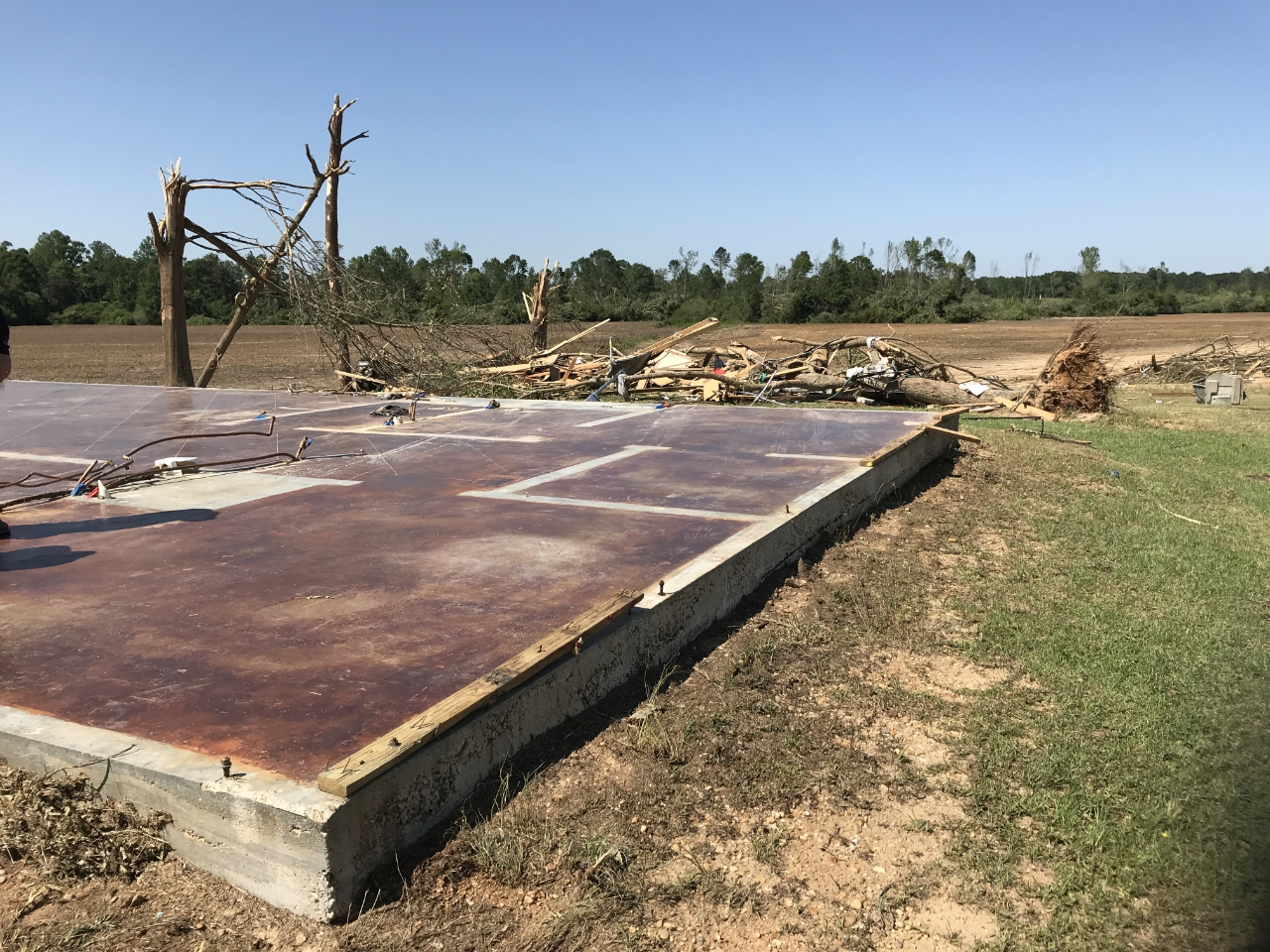
High-end EF4 damage to a large, well-anchored cabin northeast of Bassfield, Mississippi.

Over a 48-hour period from the early morning hours of April 12 through the evening of April 13, a major and deadly outbreak of 141 tornadoes unfolded across a region from Texas to Maryland, with many strong to violent tornadoes touching down and causing major damage and numerous fatalities. This event was well forecasted, with the Storm Prediction Center issuing severe weather outlooks as early as five days before the outbreak. On the morning of April 12, the SPC issued a moderate risk of severe weather for much of the Southern United States, including a 15% risk of tornadoes. At 10:40 a.m. CDT on April 12, a Particularly Dangerous Situation Tornado Watch was issued by the Storm Prediction Center across northeast Louisiana, southeast Arkansas, and central and northern Mississippi. At 11:44 a.m. CDT, a tornado emergency was issued for Monroe, Louisiana, as an EF3 tornado moved through the city, causing significant damage to more than 200 homes, as well as the Monroe Regional Airport. At 3:30 p.m. CDT, two back-to-back supercells produced three intense and long-tracked tornadoes in southern Mississippi, including two rated EF4. These strong-to-violent tornadoes prompted the National Weather Service in Jackson, Mississippi, to issue multiple tornado emergencies for numerous towns. The first of these two EF4 tornadoes leveled and swept away homes near Sartinville, Mississippi, killing four. The second one reached high-end EF4 strength as it completely debarked trees, lofted vehicles hundreds of yards through the air, and obliterated well-built homes and structures in and around the towns of Bassfield, Soso, and Moss. This tornado killed eight people and was the largest tornado ever recorded in Mississippi state history. The third tornado, which was rated EF3 and was produced by the second supercell, tore an 84.1-mile-path (135.3 km) across six counties just north of the first two tornadoes, causing major damage and injuring two. It was the longest tracked tornado of the outbreak. At 4:40 p.m. CDT, a second PDS watch was issued affecting extreme southeast Mississippi and most of Alabama, including the cities of Mobile, Montgomery, Tuscaloosa, and Birmingham. Later, a deadly, high-end EF2 tornado impacted the small community of Sumac, Georgia, destroying several mobile homes and killing eight people, while injuring 24 others. As the system progressed northeastward into the nighttime hours, another tornado emergency was issued, this time at 11:28 p.m. EDT for the towns of Ooltewah and Collegedale as a deadly EF3 tornado struck the eastern suburbs of Chattanooga, Tennessee, killing two and injuring 18.

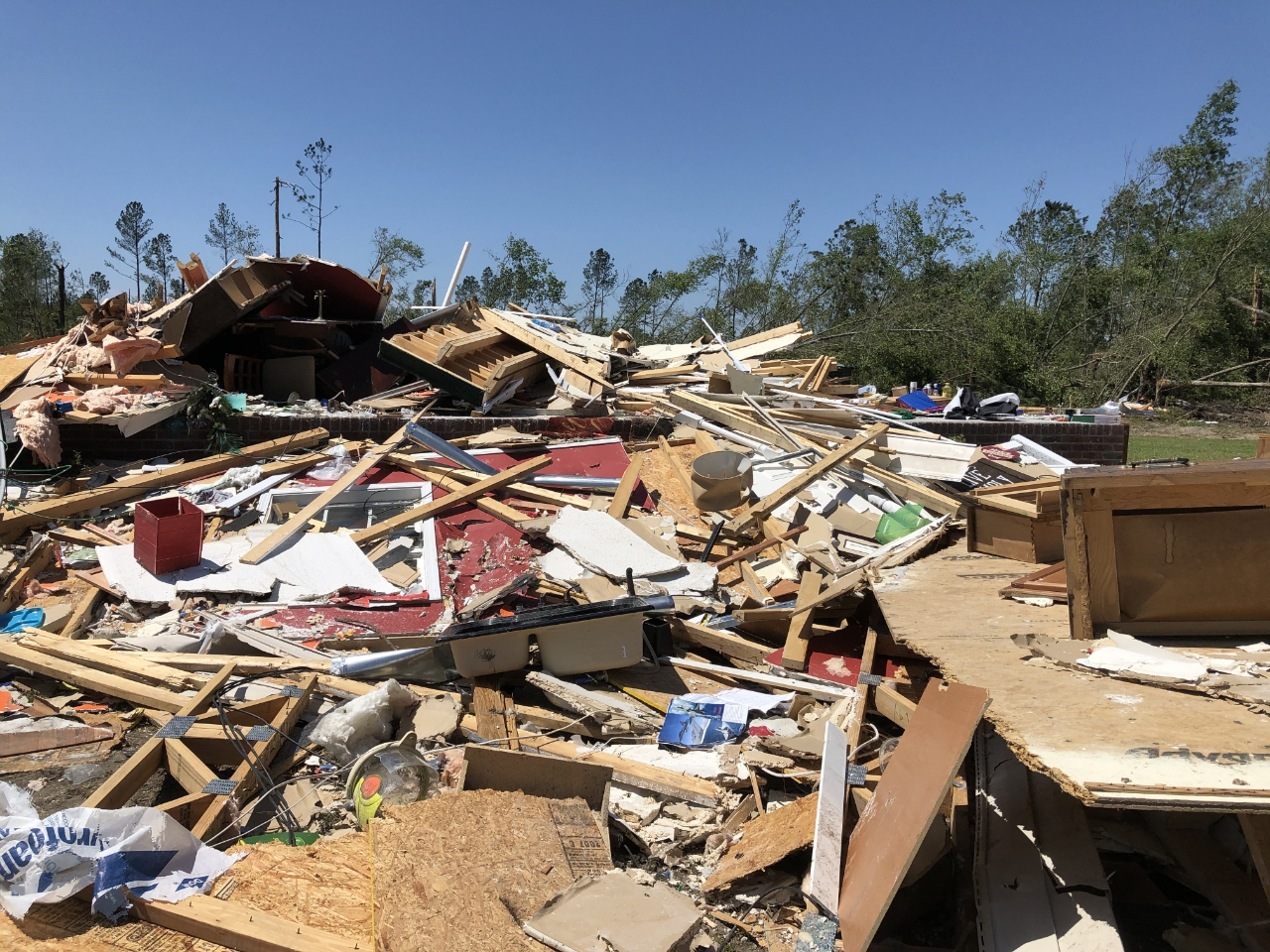
Low-end EF4 damage to a home east of Estill, South Carolina.

During the early morning hours April 13, the storms that formed the day before congealed into a strong squall line as they advanced into eastern Georgia and the Carolinas. Multiple embedded circulations and semi-discrete supercells within the line spawned numerous strong and deadly tornadoes across the region. A total of 10 tornadoes of EF3 or greater strength occurred on day two of the outbreak, including eight in South Carolina, where nine tornado-related fatalities occurred. A high-end EF3 tornado struck Seneca, South Carolina, destroying multiple homes and a manufacturing plant, killing one person and injuring five. The most significant tornado that occurred on April 13 was a violent, 3/4-mile-wide (1.2 km) EF4 tornado in Hampton County, South Carolina, that destroyed many homes and took the lives of five people near Estill and Nixville. More tornadoes were confirmed in the Carolinas before the storms pushed offshore later that morning. Another area of severe storms formed that afternoon across the Mid-Atlantic and Northeast, producing mostly wind damage, although two weak tornadoes did touch down. The storms eventually weakened below severe limits later that evening. With 32 tornado-related fatalities, it was the deadliest outbreak since April 27–30, 2014.

=== April 19–20 (United States) ===
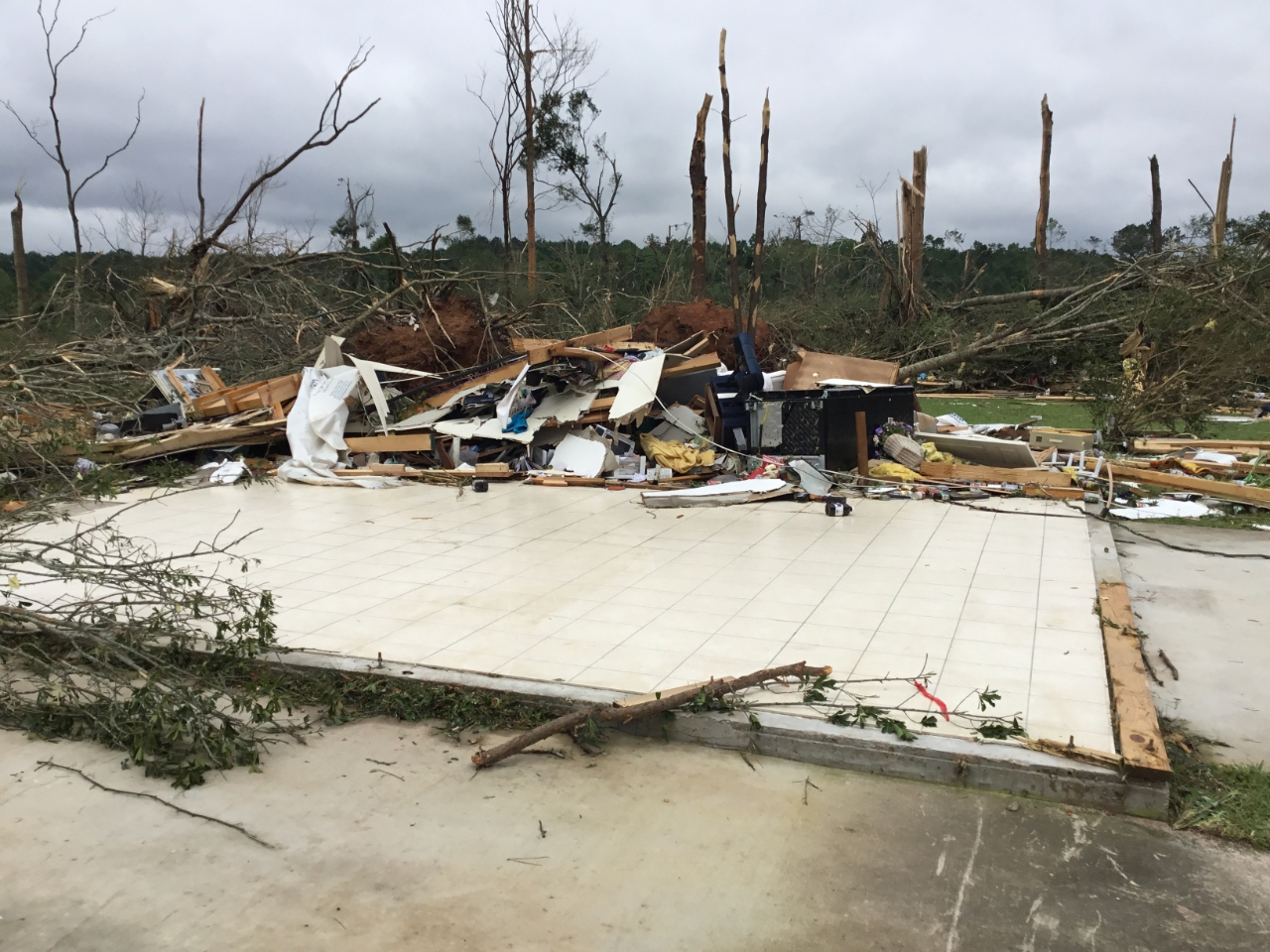
EF4 tornado damage to a home in southwest Marion County, Mississippi.

EFU	EF0	EF1	EF2	EF3	EF4	EF5
0	5	12	3	0	1	0

For the second straight Sunday and Monday, several strong to violent tornadoes touched down across the Southern United States. On April 19, the SPC issued a moderate risk of severe weather for much of the Deep South, including a 15% hatched risk of tornadoes. Later that evening, a large, violent EF4 tornado moved through or near the rural Mississippi communities of Hurricane Creek, Sandy Hook, Pine Burr, and areas north of Purvis, Mississippi, killing one person and injuring another. The tornado also resulted in $700,000 in damage. A well-built house was leveled by this tornado, and numerous other homes and mobile homes were damaged or destroyed as well. Numerous trees were also snapped and partially debarked along the path. Later that evening, an EF2 tornado caused severe damage to a duplex, a home, some chicken houses, and other structures near Andalusia, Alabama, injuring one person. An EF1 tornado caused damage to multiple mobile homes and destroyed an RV camper near Robertsdale, Alabama, as well, causing another injury. An EF2 tornado also struck the small community of Tumbleton, Alabama, tearing the roofs off of some homes and a business, and causing one fatality when a mobile home was destroyed. Early on April 20, another EF2 tornado heavily damaged several homes and a mobile home near Bridgeboro, Georgia. Later on, several more tornadoes were reported throughout the morning into the afternoon in Central Florida. An EF0 tornado caused considerable damage to mobile homes and businesses in Homosassa and Homosassa Springs, Florida. Later, an EF1 tornado was caught on video lifting a stationary construction trailer across I-75 in Wildwood, Florida. A total of 22 tornadoes were confirmed as a result of this outbreak, which resulted in two fatalities. One non-tornadic fatality occurred in South Georgia when a man was killed after lightning struck his home and caused a fire.

=== April 21–23 (United States) ===
EFU	EF0	EF1	EF2	EF3	EF4	EF5
1	15	25	10	1	0	0

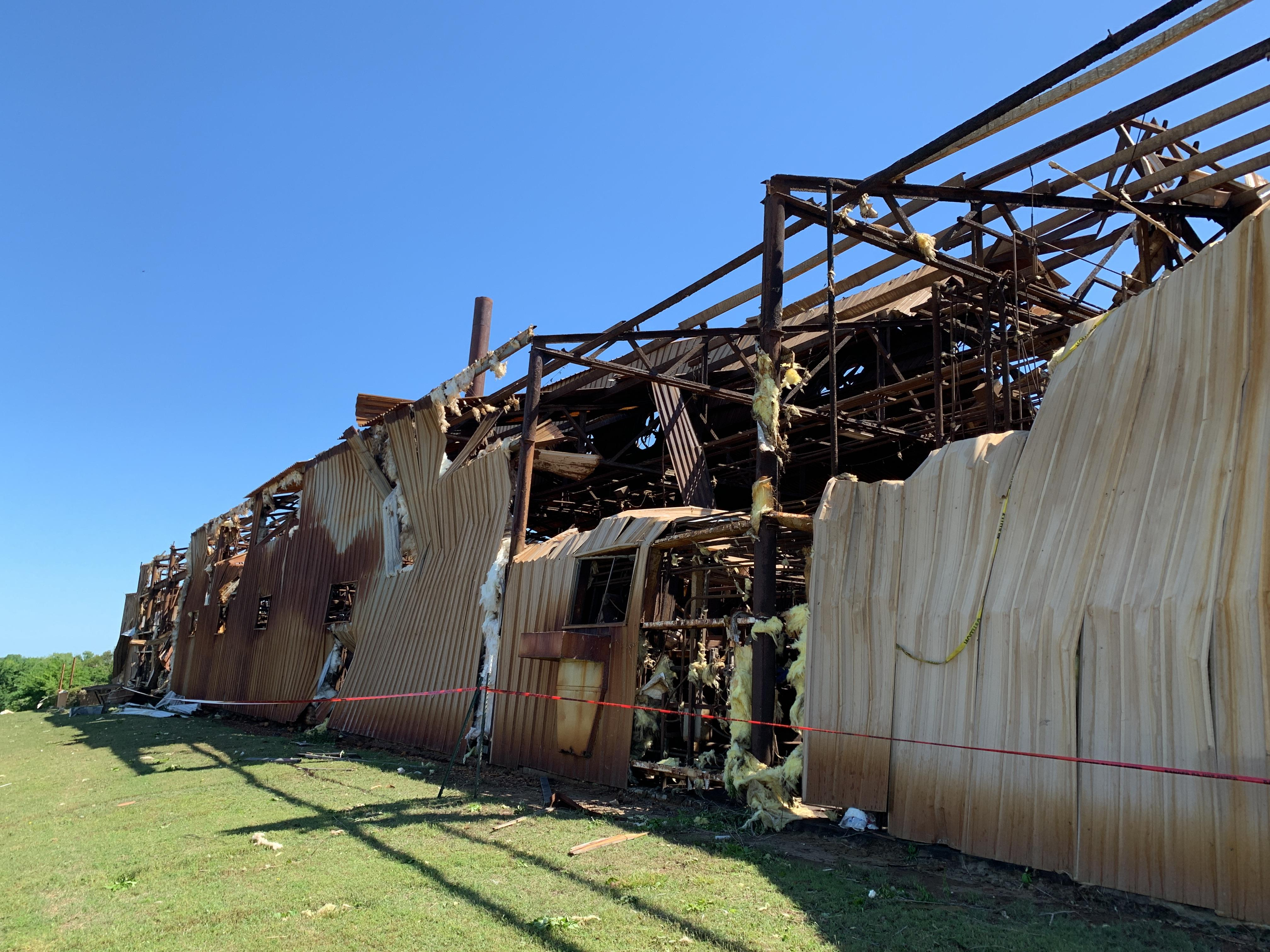
EF2 damage to a manufacturing facility in Madill, Oklahoma.

After isolated tornadic activity during the overnight hours on April 21, another day of widespread severe and tornadic weather was expected the next day. On the morning of April 22, the SPC issued an enhanced risk of severe weather for parts of Oklahoma, Texas, Louisiana, and Arkansas, which included a 10% hatched risk of tornadoes. Later that evening, multiple supercell thunderstorms developed and several tornadoes struck South Central Oklahoma east of I-35, including a narrow, but strong high-end EF2 tornado that killed two people and injured at least 30 others in Madill. Industrial buildings were severely damaged at three manufacturing facilities in Madill, while a few homes and mobile homes in town were damaged or destroyed. Several EF1 tornadoes also caused damage to homes, outbuildings, and trees near Wapanucka, Pauls Valley, and Armstrong. Further south, an isolated, long-tracked supercell tracked from East Texas to Western Mississippi, producing numerous strong and fatal tornadoes along the way. A deadly EF3 wedge tornado moved through San Jacinto and Polk County, Texas, around 6:00 p.m. CDT, leaving three dead and causing severe damage in Onalaska and Seven Oaks. Numerous homes and mobile homes were also damaged or destroyed along the path of this tornado, and 33 others were injured. The same cell warranted tornado emergencies for Jasper, Texas, at 7:08 p.m. CDT and Fort Polk, Louisiana, at 8:13 p.m. CDT respectively. An EF2 tornado also passed just south of Alexandria, Louisiana, damaging structures at LSU-Alexandria, and killing one person east of Woodworth when a mobile home was destroyed. The system continued eastward into Mississippi, Alabama, Florida, and Georgia on April 23, producing additional tornadoes. An early morning EF2 tornado significantly damaged airplane hangars near Bunkie, Louisiana, while a massive EF2 wedge tornado mowed down hundreds of trees and destroyed half of a chicken house near Soso, Mississippi, which had been devastated by an EF4 tornado 11 days prior. Another large EF2 tornado downed numerous trees, tore much of the roof off a house, and destroyed a metal building near McComb. Numerous tornadoes touched down in Florida later that day, most of which were weak, although an EF2 tornado did cause significant damage to trees, outbuildings, and mobile homes near Marianna. Overall, this outbreak produced 52 tornadoes and resulted in six fatalities.

== May ==
=== May 8 (Mexico) ===
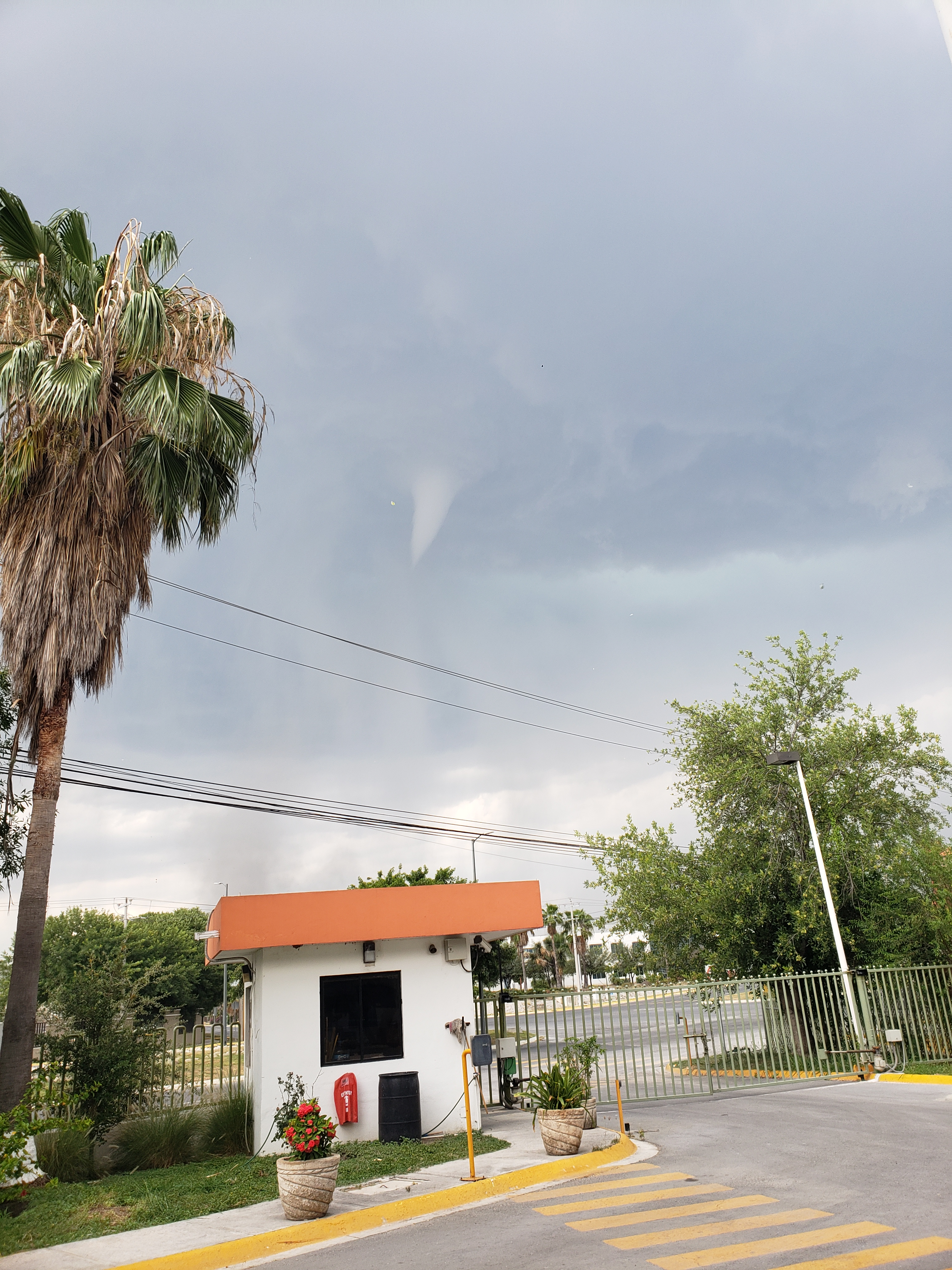
The EF2 tornado that caused two fatalities in Apodaca, Mexico.

A strong, long-tracked EF2 tornado, with winds between 180 and 220 km/hour, struck the town of Apodaca, Nuevo León, Mexico damaging over 100 cars, overturning 12 tractor-trailers, and knocking down trees, lamp posts, and power lines. Significant damage to structures also occurred at an industrial park, and brick fences were destroyed. Warehouses were heavily damaged, and an automotive service building for semi-trucks was completely destroyed. Two people were killed and at least five others were injured. One of the fatalities occurred when a security guard was lifted into the air by the tornado, and was then thrown into a billboard, while the other occurred as a result of a falling tree.

=== May 15–18 (United States) ===
EFU	EF0	EF1	EF2	EF3	EF4	EF5
5	11	9	0	1	0	0

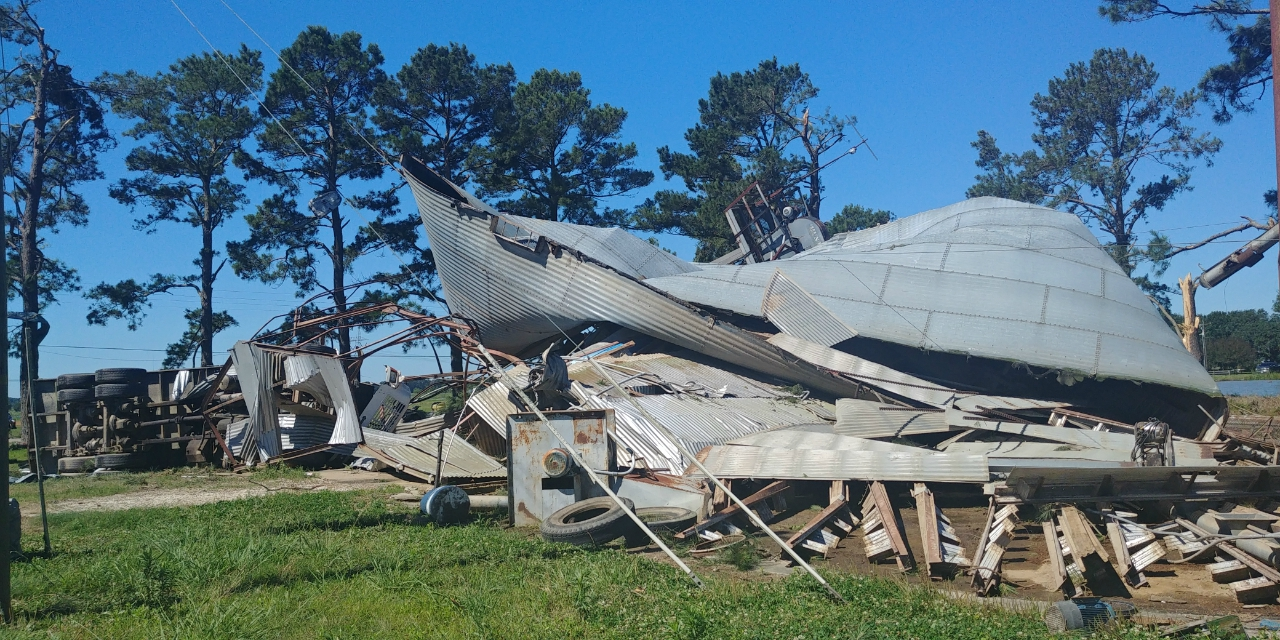
A destroyed grain bin near Church Point, Louisiana.

An unusual lull in tornado activity during the first half of May was somewhat broken by a four-day outbreak of mostly weak tornadoes that occurred in mid-May. The event began May 15, as a large MCS affected New England, generating numerous reports of wind damage, as well as an EF1 tornado in Wilton, New York, that damaged a warehouse and downed many trees. Meanwhile, another MCS struck Kansas, Oklahoma, and Arkansas, producing a high-end EF1 tornado that caused considerable damage and injured one in Keefeton, Oklahoma. Yet another large MCS formed in West Texas and pushed eastward into the morning hours of May 16, producing a few additional weak tornadoes. Later in the day, an upper-level low generated a localized outbreak of weak tornadoes in Southeastern Oklahoma and the Ark-La-Tex region, a few of which caused considerable damage. A total of 13 tornadoes were confirmed, with the most significant being a high-end EF1 tornado that damaged a nursing home and destroyed a propane supply business in Malakoff, Texas. Another EF1 tornado that struck areas just east of Texarkana, Arkansas, caused roof and power pole damage. On May 17, additional tornadoes were reported in Illinois and Louisiana. The most significant tornado of the event occurred that evening, when an EF3 tornado destroyed multiple mobile homes and a site-built home near Church Point, Louisiana, injuring nine people and killing one. Two EF0 tornadoes touched down the next day before the outbreak ended. A total of 26 tornadoes were confirmed as a result of this outbreak, which resulted in one fatality and 10 injuries.

=== May 20 (Australia) ===
Severe storms produced a damaging EF1 tornado that ripped through Geelong, Victoria, Australia, damaging more than 100 houses, with four of them being left uninhabitable. Winds in the tornado were estimated to be up to 160 km/h (100 mph) and the path width was up 60 m (197 feet). Fortunately, there were no casualties.

=== May 20 (Indonesia) ===
A destructive QLCS tornado occurred in Tulang Bawang regency, killing two people and leaving six others injured. Several houses were destroyed or collapsed and many trees were downed. A total of 66 homes were badly damaged or destroyed and 179 others sustained minor damage. The tornado itself was spawned along the leading edge of a squall line of severe thunderstorms that was moving through the area.

=== May 21–23 (United States) ===
EFU	EF0	EF1	EF2	EF3	EF4	EF5
12	13	13	0	0	0	0

A minor three-day long outbreak of weak tornadoes struck areas stretching from the Great Plains to the Southeast. It started with 10 tornadoes touching down on May 21 with the most significant one being an EF1 tornado that uprooted or snapped pine trees northeast of Raeford, North Carolina. On May 22, 14 tornadoes touched down, including an EF1 tornado that struck downtown Bowie, Texas, resulting in considerable damage to homes, businesses, trees, and vehicles. On May 23, 14 more tornadoes touched down with 11 of them striking areas from the Quad Cities metro to the Chicago metro. This included an EF0 tornado that caused damage in the Chicago suburbs of Minooka and Shorewood, downing trees and power poles and flipping a car on I-80, injuring the driver. A high-end EF1 tornado caused damage to outbuildings, grain bins, trees and power poles near Morse, Iowa, as well. Overall, 38 tornadoes were confirmed.

== June ==
=== June 4 (Philippines) ===
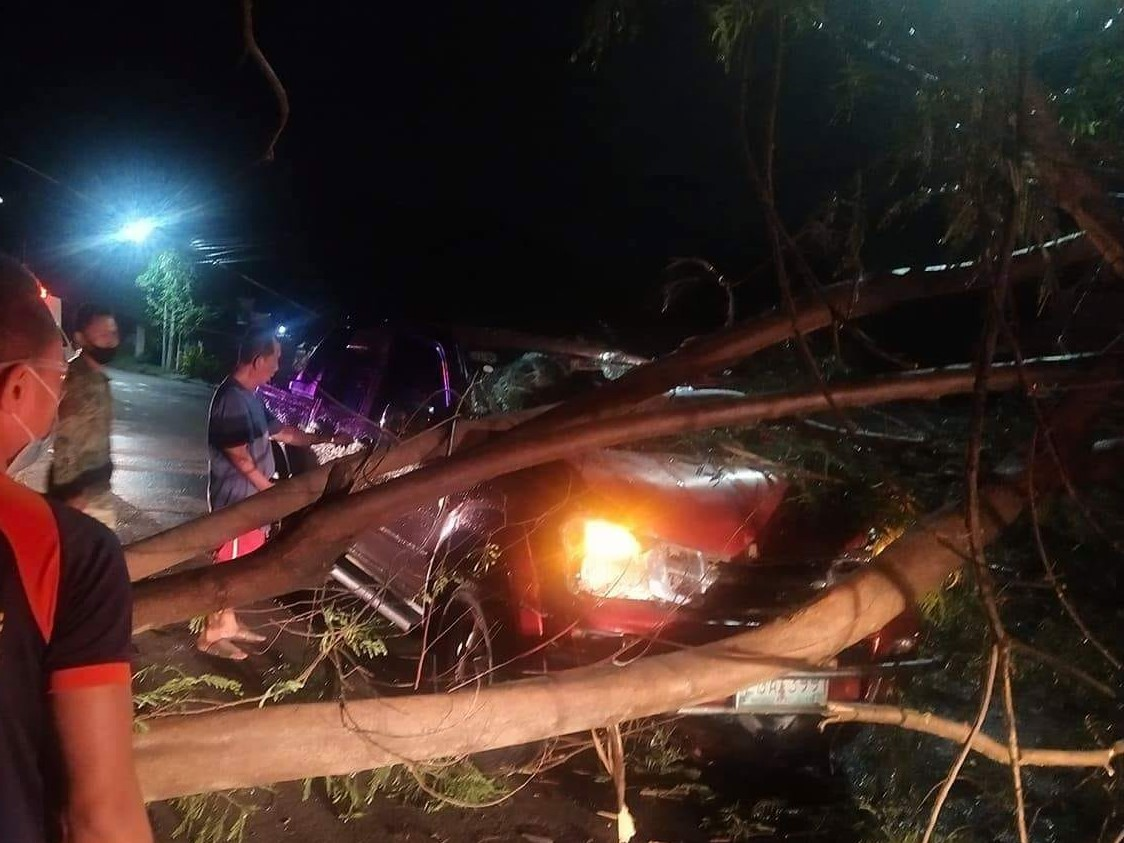
A toppled tree that struck a car caused by an EF2 tornado in General Santos on June 4, 2020

An EF2 tornado struck a village and portions of the central business district in General Santos an hour before midnight. It damaged approximately 43 houses, toppled electrical poles, and uprooted trees. It also struck parts of the city's downtown area where it toppled trees and scattered debris near SM City General Santos.

=== June 6–10 (United States and Canada) ===
EFU	EF0	EF1	EF2	EF3	EF4	EF5
12	14	11	2	0	0	0

Simultaneously to Tropical Storm Cristobal, a strong cold front moved slowly through the High Plains and Great Lakes regions, producing widespread severe weather and spawning numerous tornadoes. On June 6, an EF1 tornado near Arlington, Wyoming, snapped and uprooted numerous trees. An EFU tornado also touched down in Haakon County, South Dakota, flipping a vehicle. On June 7, the SPC issued an enhanced risk of severe weather for the High Plains, including a 10% hatched risk of tornadoes. One supercell thunderstorm produced three EF1 tornadoes across central South Dakota, causing damage to sheds, outbuildings, and trees. June 8 was the most prolific day of the outbreak, when 11 tornadoes touched down in North Dakota, Minnesota, and Nebraska. A rain-wrapped EF1 tornado struck near Middle River, Minnesota, snapping numerous trees. A very large EF2 wedge tornado tore a 31.7 kilometre (19.7 mi)-long path through portions of Northwestern Ontario near Brooks Lake. The Brooks Lake tornado was 2.44 kilometres (1.52 mi) wide and snapped or uprooted countless large trees in remote forested area, and analysis of treefall patterns suggests that the tornado may have been stronger than EF2. On June 9, a cold front moved eastward and absorbed the moisture-laden remnants of Cristobal, the SPC issued a moderate risk for severe weather for June 10 in the Great Lakes region. The moderate risk was for a 45% hatched area of damaging winds, although there was a large 5% tornado area as well. That afternoon, a large derecho formed over the eastern Midwestern United States and Eastern Canada and moved eastward, producing widespread wind damage. Four tornadoes would strike Ohio, and western Pennsylvania. This included a high-end EF1 tornado that struck the communities of Ohioville and Daugherty Township, in Pennsylvania. In Ohioville, several power poles and trees were snapped near I-376. As the tornado traveled eastward into Daugherty Township, 40-50 hardwood trees were snapped or uprooted. One tree left a six-foot-deep crater in the ground where it was uprooted, before the tornado would eventually dissipate. Additionally, ten tornadoes touched down in Ontario on June 10. The strongest and most damaging tornado was an EF2 tornado that impacted Mary Lake, flattening a large swath of trees. June 10 left over 700,000 people in the United States without power across the Great Lakes region. Overall, 38 tornadoes touched down across the United States and Canada over the five-day period, along with over 1000 reports of severe winds and wind damage from Utah to New York. This included a 110 mph wind gust in Winter Park, Colorado, from another derecho that formed in eastern Utah and moved through Colorado, Wyoming, South Dakota, and Nebraska before weakening in eastern North Dakota.

=== June 7–8 (Europe) ===
FU	F0	F1	F2	F3	F4	F5
5	2	1	1	0	0	0

A small outbreak of mostly weak tornadoes impacted Europe beginning on June 7, including an F1 tornado that caused considerable roof and tree damage as it struck the small Russian village of Yerunakovo in Kemerovo Oblast. The most damaging event was a low-end F2 tornado that caused significant damage in Kaniów, Poland. Power lines were downed and at least 21 homes were damaged in town, several of which had their roofs torn off. Some garages and gazebos were destroyed as well. A tornado also touched down near the community of Kulikovka in Tula Oblast, Russia, though it remained over unpopulated areas and caused no damage. Additional tornadoes touched down on June 8, including three landspout type tornadoes that occurred in rural areas of western Russia, causing no damage. A large cone tornado was photographed and caught on video as it moved over fields near the town of Lukšiai in Lithuania, causing no known damage. An F0 tornado caused minor tree and roof damage in Vicoforte, Italy, while another F0 rope tornado flattened grass in a convergent pattern as it touched down in a field in Trecate. A total of nine tornadoes were confirmed.

=== June 10 (Vietnam) ===
A tornado caused a large wood processing warehouse in Vĩnh Phúc Province of Vietnam to collapse, killing three people and injuring eighteen others.

=== June 15 (India) ===
A tornado touched down in the Kendrapara District of Odisha and caused damage to 70 thatched houses in the villages of Talchua, Tikayat Nagar, RajendraNagar, Baghamari, Giria Pahi, Garta and Banipal in Rajnagar Block. It was on the ground for 5 to 10 minutes and caused 12 injuries. Kendrapara District Collector Samarth Verma said that the wind speed of the tornado was probably more than 100 kmph (60 mi/h).

== July ==
=== July 6–8 (United States and Canada) ===
EFU	EF0	EF1	EF2	EF3	EF4	EF5
6	16	3	2	0	1	0

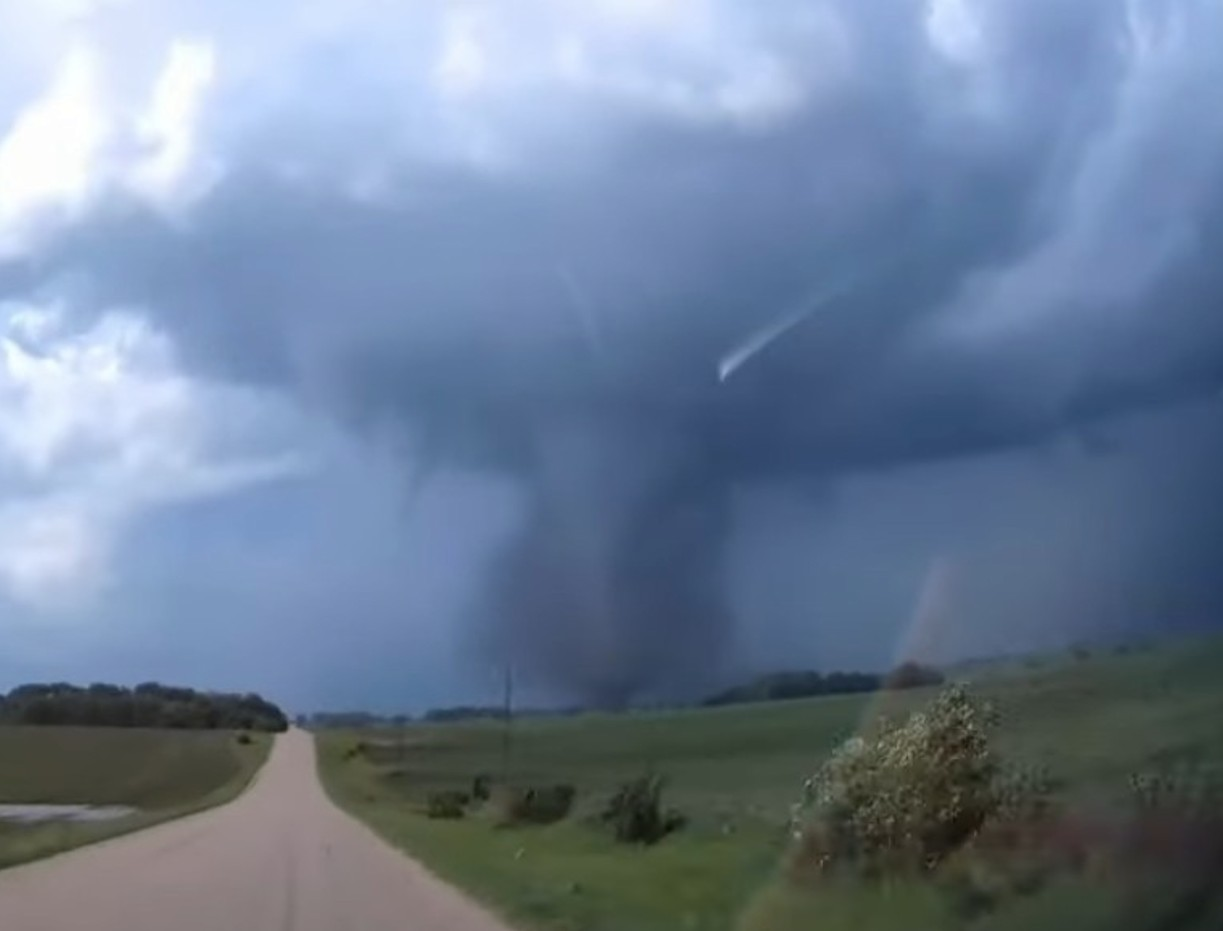
An EF4 tornado near Ashby, Minnesota on July 8

A moderate tornado outbreak struck the Midwest and Northern Great Plains in early July. On July 6, a large EF2 tornado moved through the Black Hills National Forest in both Crook County, Wyoming, and Lawrence County, South Dakota, snapping numerous large ponderosa pine trees. Four weak tornadoes were confirmed on July 7 before a significant derecho tore across the Northern Great Plains with winds up to 89 mph (143 km/h) reported in Montana. Farther to the north in Canada, five EF0 landspout tornadoes were also confirmed in Alberta on July 7. Early on July 8, the same line of storms produced an EF2 tornado that caused considerable damage to outbuildings, farming equipment, trees, and power poles near Henning, Minnesota. That afternoon, a rapidly intensifying supercell generated a relatively narrow, but violent EF4 tornado, which was described by storm chasers as being a "drillbit" at times, that significantly damaged or destroyed three farmsteads south of Dalton, Minnesota. A picture of the tornado was chosen as the cover for the movie 13 Minutes. One farmhouse and a machine shop were completely swept away, vehicles and pieces of farm machinery were thrown and mangled, trees were snapped and debarked, and farm fields were scoured. One person was killed and three others were injured. An EF0 tornado also caused minor tree and property damage near Garrison. Numerous landspout tornadoes were also reported in Nebraska and Colorado. Overall, the outbreak produced 28 tornadoes, killing one person and injuring three others.

=== July 8–10 (Europe) ===
IFU	IF0	IF0.5	IF1	IF1.5	IF2	IF2.5	IF3	IF4	IF5
6	1	1	1	3	3	1	0	0	0

Several tornadoes touched down across portions of Russia and Poland from July 8–10, several of which were strong. The event began in coastal areas of Krasnodar Krai in Russia on July 8, where seven waterspouts developed and three of them moved ashore, briefly becoming tornadoes. The first of them caused IF0.5/T1 damage in Golubitskaya, where sheds and pieces of beach furniture were thrown, and fencing was damaged, while an IF0/T0 tornado passed near lighthouse in Gelendzhik. The last one caused no damage near Arkhipo-Osipovka. A tornado was also caught on video in Leningrad Oblast, though it remained over unpopulated areas, caused no known damage and wasn't documented by European Severe Weather Database. The most significant event of the day was an IF2.5/T5 tornado that impacted the small village of Baydino in Tula Oblast, where a small frame house, a barn, and the village toilet facility were lifted from their foundations and completely destroyed. Debris was scattered up to 300 m (0.19 mi) away. A timber house had its two exterior walls collapsed, causing the roof to slide down. Trees in the area were uprooted and snapped, and several other homes sustained major roof damage and lost most of their roof tiles. Two tornadoes, IF1.5/T3 and IF2/T4 flattened a forest in Vladimir Oblast. On July 9, an IF1/T2 tornado struck Argunovo, where homes and structures sustained heavy roof damage, and trees were damaged as well. An IF2 tornado occurred in a forest near Kepino, Arkhangelsk Oblast. Tornado activity continued on July 10, when an IF2 tornado moved through the outskirts of Ustronie Morskie in Poland, where several mobile homes were severely damaged or destroyed, and six people were injured. Two of the mobile homes were reportedly carried a small distance by the tornado. A rain-wrapped IF1.5 tornado struck the Russian town of Borodino, where homes and apartment buildings sustained roof and window damage, including one structure that had its roof blown off entirely. Trees and power lines were damaged as well. In addition, another IF1.5 struck Novaya Solyanka, causing roof and tree damage. Overall, a total of sixteen tornadoes were confirmed.

=== July 19 (Northern United States and Canada) ===
EFU	EF0	EF1	EF2	EF3	EF4	EF5
1	3	8	1	0	0	0

On July 19, a front passed through the Great Lakes region during the morning hours. Along the front, widespread damaging winds were reported with fourteen downbursts in Canada. Shortly after midnight (local time), an EF1 tornado that caused tree and outbuilding damage was confirmed near Osseo, Wisconsin. In Ontario, nine tornadoes were confirmed. Of the nine tornadoes, there were three EF0 tornadoes near the towns of Kettle Point, St. Columban and Belmont. The remaining six tornadoes were of EF1 strength, and they hit near the towns of Thedford, Blyth, Lucan, Gads Hill, Beachville and Eden Mills. These weak tornadoes downed numerous trees, and also caused some damage to structures. There were two additional tornadoes in Quebec, both of which downed numerous trees in forested areas north of La Sarre, one of which was rated EF2, while the other was rated EF1. An unrated tornadic waterspout was also confirmed over Lake Huron. A total of 13 tornadoes were confirmed.

=== July 22 (China) ===
On July 22, an isolated supercell thunderstorm moved through Anhui Province in China, producing a strong, long-tracked tornado that passed through rural areas near Suzhou, snapping numerous large trees and scouring farm fields. A large storage container was thrown, and several large metal truss transmission towers were blown over and mangled. The tornado was rated EF3, and was on the ground for 62 km (39 mi). One person died.

=== July 30 (Russia) ===
An isolated but strong F2 tornado struck the village of Loyno, Kirov Oblast, causing damage to 10 homes, including some that had their roofs completely ripped off. Vehicles were tossed and damaged, and trees and power lines were downed as well.

== August ==
=== August 2 (Canada) ===
EFU	EF0	EF1	EF2	EF3	EF4	EF5
0	1	2	1	0	0	0

On August 2, severe thunderstorms produced four tornadoes that caused damage in parts of Ontario. The strongest tornado of the event caused EF2 damage as it mowed down large swaths of trees and struck the small village of Kinmount, where 12 homes sustained varying degrees of roof damage and broken windows, and some were damaged by fallen trees. A cross was torn from the roof of a church in town, and a few garages and outbuildings were destroyed, with debris scattered through a neighborhood and wrapped around trees and telephone wires. The EF2 tornado was preceded by an EF1 tornado that downed trees in a rural forest near Bexley. An EF1 tornado also struck the small community of Camden East, where an older brick building had its roof blown off and thrown into a nearby country store. Some homes in town sustained roof damage, and trees were downed, some of which landed on cars. An EF0 tornado was also confirmed near Oxford Mills, and caused minor tree damage. No injuries or fatalities occurred as a result of the tornadoes.

=== August 3–4 (Hurricane Isaias) ===
EFU	EF0	EF1	EF2	EF3	EF4	EF5
0	11	20	7	1	0	0

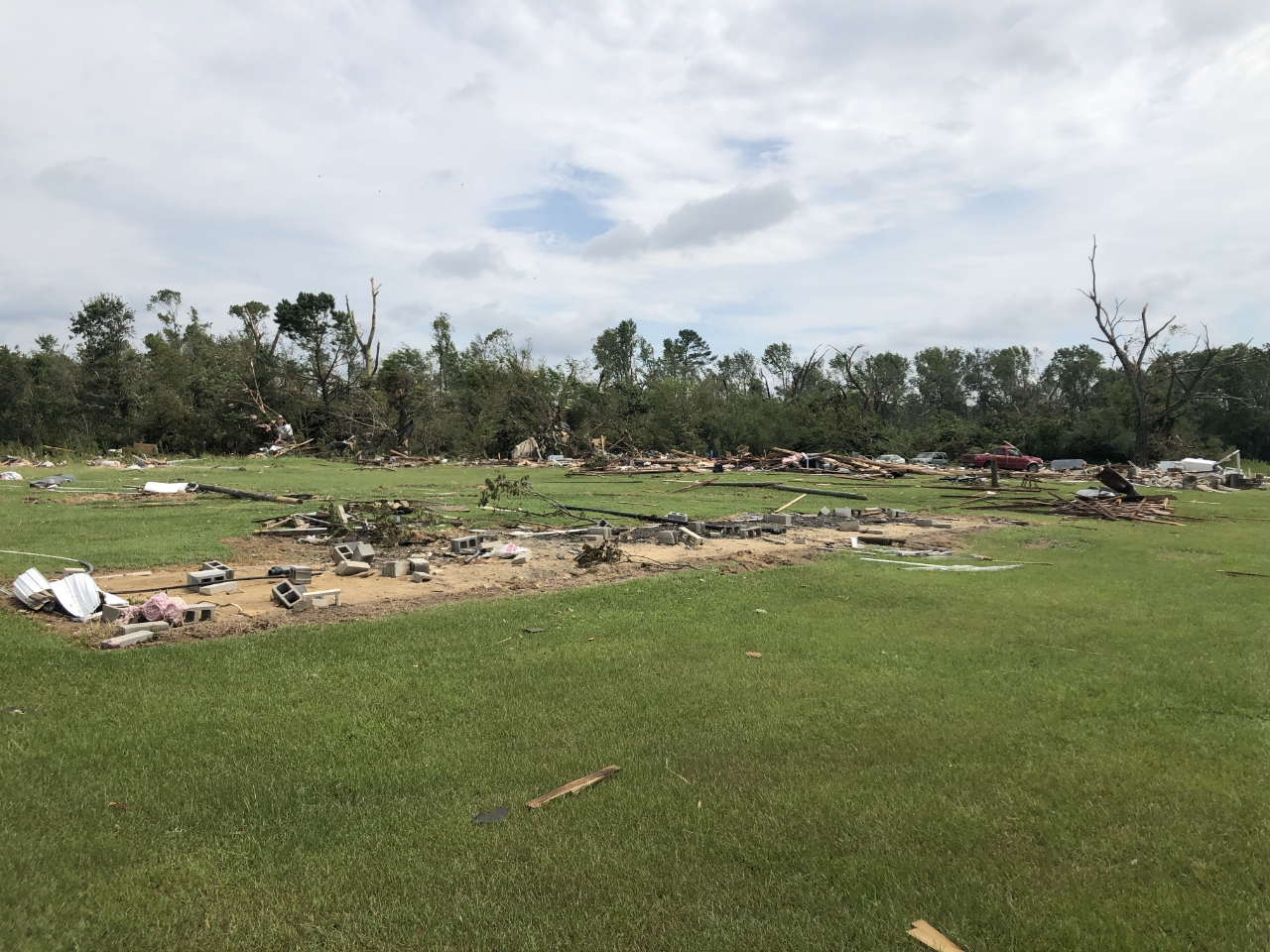
Mobile homes destroyed near Windsor, North Carolina, by an EF3 tornado.

Radar loop around the time of the Murfreesboro, North Carolina EF0 tornado that prompted a PDS tornado warning.

A tornado outbreak occurred as Hurricane Isaias moved up the East Coast of the United States, with 109 tornado warnings being issued across 12 states. On August 3, an EF2 tornado downed numerous large trees and caused damage to homes in Bald Head Island and Southport, North Carolina. Later, a waterspout moved ashore and caused EF0 damage to multiple homes in Garden City Beach, South Carolina, injuring one. An EF1 tornado also caused damage to multiple homes in Leland, North Carolina. Early on August 4, a large and destructive EF3 tornado south of Windsor, North Carolina, obliterated multiple mobile homes, completely destroyed a site-built home, and tossed several vehicles, killing two and injuring 14. It was the strongest tornado spawned by a tropical cyclone since 2005. A tornado that touched down near Murfreesboro, North Carolina, generated a large TDS, prompting a PDS tornado warning, though only EF0 damage occurred. An EF2 tornado caused major damage to businesses in the Courtland, Virginia, area, while two tornadoes, rated EF0 and EF1, also hit Suffolk, Virginia, with the EF1 tornado causing considerable damage in the downtown area. Around sunrise, a high-end EF2 tornado caused severe damage to homes and injured five people near Palmer, before causing less intense damage in and around Kilmarnock, Virginia, injuring five. As that tornado dissipated, another EF2 tornado struck just outside of Mardela Springs, Maryland, downing trees and damaging a few homes, one of which was pushed off its foundation. Yet another EF2 tornado destroyed chicken houses in George Island Landing, Maryland. Later that morning, a damaging EF2 tornado touched down in Dover, Delaware, before tracking through Townsend and Middletown, becoming the longest tracked tornado in the state since 1950. An EF2 tornado also injured six people as it struck the northeastern Philadelphia suburbs, tossing vehicles at a hospital parking lot and heavily damaging a daycare center in Doylestown. In all, a total of 39 tornadoes were confirmed as a result of this outbreak, along with two fatalities and 26 injuries.

=== August 7 (Canada) ===
At around 8 p.m., a large tornado touched down in southern Manitoba, passing near the towns of Virden and Scarth, causing considerable damage to a farm. Multiple large metal grain silos were thrown or destroyed, power poles were snapped or pulled out of the ground, and trees were snapped and denuded as well. Farming equipment was tossed and mangled, the ground was scarred by debris impacts, and two people were killed while another was injured when the tornado lofted their cars into the air and threw them 100 metres (110 yd) away into a field. In August 2024, new research came to light that the tornado was likely much more violent than estimated; the force necessary to toss the specific cars the aforementioned distance would’ve required winds in excess of 400 km/h (250 mph), well above the threshold for EF5 intensity; though Environment and Climate Change Canada (ECCC) has not officially integrated this data as of 2025.

=== August 9 (China) ===
A damaging EF2 tornado hit Swan Lake, a tourist site in the Inner Mongolia Autonomous Region of north China, damaging or destroying over 100 yurts and injuring 33 people.

=== August 10 (United States) ===
EFU	EF0	EF1	EF2	EF3	EF4	EF5
4	8	13	0	0	0	0

A massive, long-tracked, destructive derecho that traveled over 770 miles (1,240 km) from southeastern South Dakota to western Ohio generated 25 weak tornadoes. EF0 and EF1 tornadoes moved through parts of Rockford, Illinois, causing widespread damage to trees, homes, and businesses. A high-end EF1 tornado tore roofing from businesses in Ottawa, Illinois, and another EF1 tornado blew the steeple off of a church in Wheaton, Illinois. A high-end EF1 tornado damaged trees, power lines, and roofs in Rogers Park, Illinois, just north of Downtown Chicago. Another high-end EF1 tornado also caused considerable damage to farms and crops near Wakarusa, Indiana, as well. Although there were no tornado-related casualties, the event as a whole killed four people.

=== August 14 (Brazil) ===
EFU	EF0	EF1	EF2	EF3	EF4	EF5
1	0	0	0	1	0	0

Two tornadoes moved through parts of the state of Santa Catarina in Brazil, including a strong, rain-wrapped, and long-tracked EF3 wedge tornado that caused major damage in Água Doce. Roughly 700 homes were damaged in the municipality, 25 of which were destroyed. Some homes were left with only a few walls standing, and numerous others sustained partial to total roof loss. A church was completely destroyed, and many utility poles, trees, and brick fences were also downed. Major tree damage occurred as the tornado exited Água Doce and passed through rural areas to the south of Treze Tílias, with large swaths of trees completely mowed down in this area. A few homes were damaged or destroyed as well. The tornado then struck Tangará, damaging or destroying additional homes, overturning vehicles, and damaging some large metal buildings. One house in the Tangará area was completely leveled with debris strewn downwind, though it was not well-built. The two occupants of the home were thrown a considerable distance, though sustained only minor injuries. At least 11 people were injured by the tornado, including two critical injuries. Another damaging tornado of unknown intensity struck the Irineópolis area, where multiple homes sustained varying degrees of roof damage, and a few smaller homes were completely destroyed. Many trees were snapped along the path, and outbuildings were damaged or destroyed as well. Destructive straight-line winds and hail also caused significant damage in Catanduvas and Vargem Bonita.

=== August 15 (California) ===
EFU	EF0	EF1	EF2	EF3	EF4	EF5
1	0	2	0	0	0	0

The intense heat produced by the Loyalton Fire in California spawned a Pyrocumulonimbus cloud that generated an EF1 anticyclonic tornado south of Chilcoot. Several pine trees were snapped or uprooted by the tornado. The National Weather Service in Reno, Nevada, issued a tornado warning for the storm, marking the first time that such a warning had ever been issued for a fire-spawned tornado. A second EF1 tornado spawned by the storm also snapped and uprooted trees. A third tornado, rated EFU, was spawned by the same circulation but did not cause any damage.

=== August 26–28 (Hurricane Laura) ===
EFU	EF0	EF1	EF2	EF3	EF4	EF5
0	8	7	1	0	0	0

The approach and landfall of Hurricane Laura resulted in a small three day outbreak of mostly weak tornadoes across the Southern United States. Late on August 27, a strong storm in Arkansas produced a high-end EF1 tornado that caused significant damage to a church at Lake City, another EF1 tornado that struck Goobertown north of Brookland, and an EF2 tornado that damaged multiple structures and homes southwest of Maynard. A total of 16 tornadoes were confirmed as a result of this outbreak with eight of them occurring in the Arkansas, making it the largest tornado outbreak ever recorded in the state during the month of August.

=== August 29–30 (Europe) ===
FU	F0	F1	F2	F3	F4	F5
1	2	1	2	0	0	0

On August 29, an outbreak of severe storms and tornadoes occurred in Europe, with the most severe impacts affecting Italy and Spain. In Italy, violent downburst winds struck areas between Verona and Vicenza, and large hail up to 5–6 centimetres (2.0–2.4 in) hit the regions of Lombardy, Veneto, Emilia and Friuli. An F1 tornado hit the countryside south of Verona, causing moderate damage to homes, businesses, sheds, fences, and trees in the Trevenzuolo area. A weak waterspout also moved ashore and became an F0 tornado near Genoa, causing minor damage to fencing, trees, and dumpsters. A second F0 tornado occurred later in the evening in the Maniago area, where it damaged trees and roofs, as well as flattened crops. The strongest tornado of the day occurred in Spain, where a large, wedge-shaped tornadic waterspout off the coast of Mallorca moved ashore near Banyalbufar, becoming an F2 tornado. After moving ashore, the tornado passed through a densely forested area, flattening a large swath of trees. A few homes were damaged by the tornado as well. The following day, more severe storms in Italy hit Tuscany, Umbria, Lazio, and Marche. Hail up to 5 centimetres (2.0 in) hit the city of Ancona, while strong and damaging downburst winds hit Tuscany, Umbria and Lazio. A strong F2 tornado hit the countryside just north of Viterbo. This tornado damaged many well-built farm houses, some of which sustained significant damage. Outbuildings were destroyed, and sheet metal was wrapped around trees and power lines. Many trees were snapped or uprooted, some of which sustained low-end debarking. A large metal electric pylon was blown over, a concrete power pole was snapped, and farming equipment was thrown and destroyed. Signs and fences were downed, and an animal breeding facility sustained roof loss and major damage to its brick exterior walls. Multiple animals were crushed by debris at this location. Two people were injured by the tornado as well. A weak tornado was also spotted and photographed in France near Veigy-Foncenex, causing no known damage. A total of six tornadoes were confirmed.

=== August 30 (South Dakota) ===
A 73-year-old man was killed in Hand County, South Dakota, after a strong EF2 tornado hit the trailer-pulling RV he was driving near the town of Miller. The tornado detached the two units and threw them both into a field west of the road, with the RV traveling 150 to 200 yards (140 to 180 m).

== September ==
=== September 5 (United States) ===
EFU	EF0	EF1	EF2	EF3	EF4	EF5
0	0	1	1	0	0	0

The intense heat and pyrocumulonimbus clouds generated by the Creek Fire in California produced two mesocylonic fire tornadoes near Huntington Lake that snapped trees. The first was rated EF2 while the other was rated EF1. Significant tree damage, including some debarking, was noted along the path of the EF2 tornado.

=== September 16–18 (Hurricane Sally) ===
EFU	EF0	EF1	EF2	EF3	EF4	EF5
2	17	4	0	0	0	0

Several weak tornadoes touched down from Georgia to North Carolina in association with Hurricane Sally. During the evening of September 16, a brief EF1 tornado displaced gravestones and damaged a church at a cemetery near Waycross, Georgia. On September 17, an EF1 tornado near Reevesville, South Carolina, uprooted or snapped many trees at a tree farm. In all, 23 tornadoes were confirmed from this small, three-day event.

=== September 17 (Nicaragua) ===
During the early morning hours of September 17, a weak F0 tornado struck several neighborhoods in western Managua, Nicaragua, causing significant damage. It tore roofs from homes, downed dozens of trees, and damaged power lines and poles. The initial assessments after the tornado indicated that 72 homes were damaged, including five that collapsed. A later government assessment reported 111 affected homes, including three that were destroyed. The Sagrado Corazón de Jesús church and the National Dermatological Hospital both suffered roof damage. Medical services were temporarily disrupted at the hospital due to the tornado. At least 14 people were injured and no fatalities were reported. Following the tornado, emergency crews cleared fallen trees and debris, while authorities distributed emergency supplies and roofing materials to affected families and announced assistance with rebuilding destroyed homes.

=== September 25–27 (Europe) ===
FU	F0	F1	F2	F3	F4	F5
1	6	2	3	0	0	0

An intense storm system spawned several tornadoes along with a very high number of waterspouts in multiple European nations. On September 25, tornadoes struck France, Italy and Denmark. The outbreak started that morning when a large tornadic waterspout struck the eastern portions of the Italian city of Salerno, uprooting trees, causing light structural damage, and injuring one person. That afternoon, a low-end IF2/F2/T4 tornado struck and damaged two schools in Albertslund, Denmark, and caused considerable damage to homes and trees along a 4.4 kilometer long path. A couple of supercells in northern Italy produced two more tornadoes. One of these tornadoes remained over open fields and caused no damage in the Negrar area, while the other in the Arba area caused light damage to homes, trees and anti-hail nets. That evening, two waterspouts made landfall in the Rosignano Marittimo area. The stronger of the two ripped roofs off of structures, downed trees, injured eight people, and was rated F2. The second one moved a few boats, lightly damaged a roof and downed a few trees. During the nighttime hours, a waterspout made landfall in northern France causing some light damage. A second waterspout came ashore in eastern Genoa, causing some scattered damage as well. September 26 saw a possible but unconfirmed tornado in Northern France before more severe weather returned on September 27. Two F1 tornadoes struck the western regions of Italy, with one hitting Nettuno and the other impacting the Casal di Principe area. The Casal de Principe tornado downed trees and power poles, and caused damage to signs, small buildings, and roofs. In Nettuno, trees were downed or damaged, a cemetery suffered some damage, while roofs and sheet metal structures were severely damaged. Roulottes, campers, and cars were flipped as well. A small tornado struck Viriat, France and damaged some trees and greenhouses. Lastly, a large, strong F2 tornado touched down in Ukraine's Kherson region in the village of Velikaya Aleksandrovka, causing widespread damage to over 300 residential buildings and hundreds of other structures, including a school that was unroofed. A few structures sustained damage to exterior walls, and many trees were snapped or denuded as well. A total of 12 tornadoes were confirmed as a result of this outbreak.

== October ==
=== October 8–11 (Hurricane Delta) ===
EFU	EF0	EF1	EF2	EF3	EF4	EF5
0	10	4	0	0	0	0

Hurricane Delta bought strong winds and 14 tornadoes to the Southeastern United States. The most active day was October 10, when numerous tornado warnings were issued in Georgia as a squall line moved through the region. At least six tornadoes were reported. An EF1 tornado injured two people in Covington, Georgia. Another EF1 tornado injured one in Conway, South Carolina, on October 11.

=== October 17 (Ukraine) ===
A destructive F2 tornado in Kirovohrad Oblast damaged or destroyed over 100 houses, and left three people injured in the Kropyvnytskyi area. Businesses also sustained major damage, and metal debris was wrapped around trees and power lines. Numerous trees were snapped and denuded in forested areas along the path as well.

=== October 23 (Indonesia) ===
A short-lived, but damaging spin-up tornado embedded within a line of storms struck the city of Bekasi in West Java, causing significant damage to several homes and tossing several motorcycles, billboards, and roofs.

== November ==
=== November 5 (Indonesia) ===
A narrow but damaging rope tornado touched down in Gunung Kidul Regency, causing severe roof damage to 47 houses, collapsing one house, and knocking down several trees, causing damage to more houses and blocking roads.

=== November 9 (Indonesia) ===
A tornado accompanied by a hailstorm struck the town of Maros, South Sulawesi, damaging 11 houses and collapsing the roof of a mosque.

=== November 17 (South Africa) ===
A tornado, estimated to be of EF2 or EF3 intensity struck Mthatha, Eastern Cape, significantly damaging or destroying homes, a school, and an airport. Several vehicles were thrown.

=== November 20 (Cyprus) ===
A strong F2 tornado moved through the Kazafani area in the unrecognized state of Northern Cyprus, causing significant damage in Platymátis, Ozanköy, and Catalköy. The tornado heavily damaged multiple houses and a power plant, and overturned or moved several vehicles as well. Many trees and power poles were snapped along the path, and a metal truss high-tension tower was also blown over.

=== November 24–25 (United States) ===
EFU	EF0	EF1	EF2	EF3	EF4	EF5
0	0	4	1	0	0	0

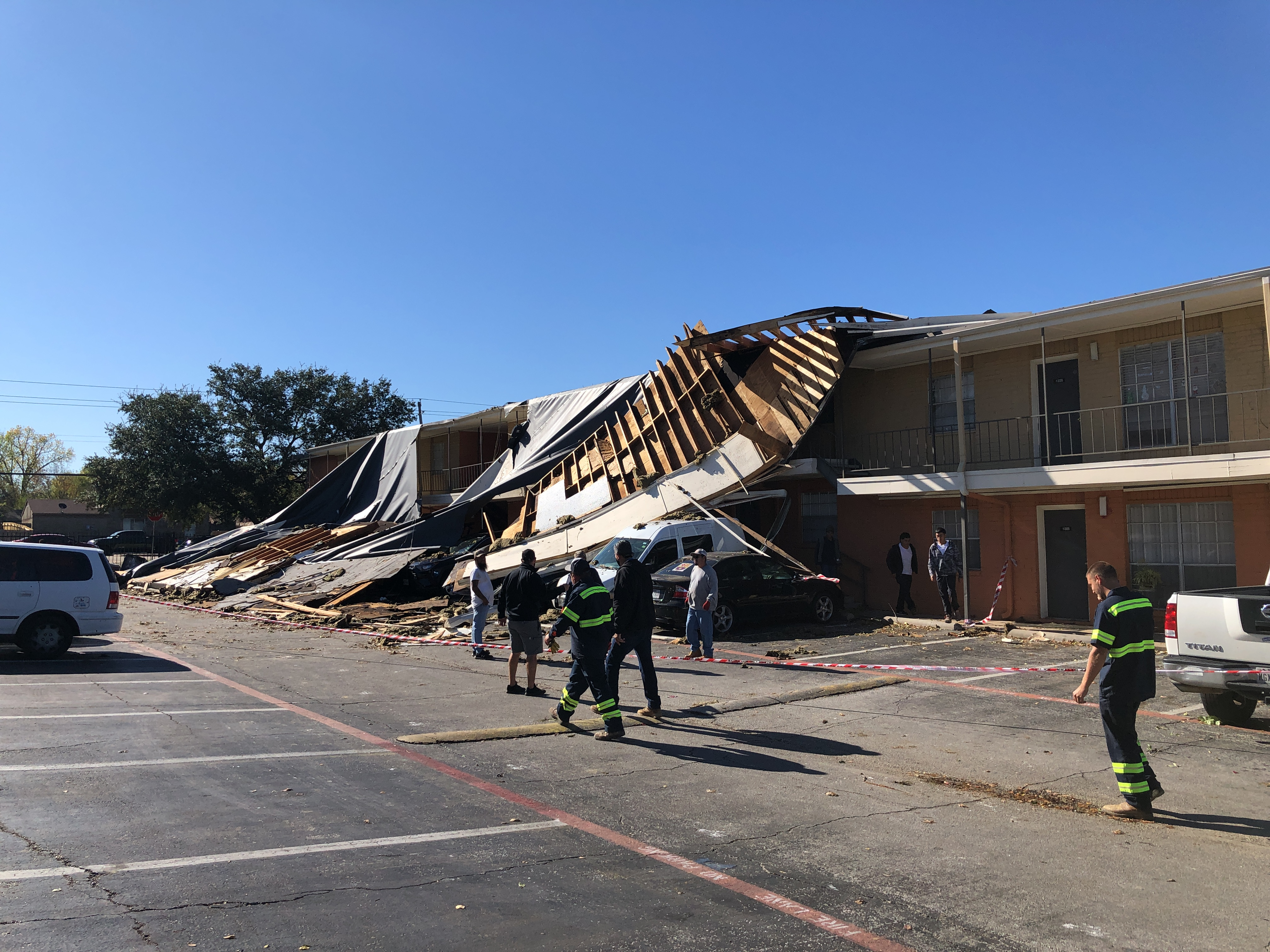
EF2 damage to an apartment building in Arlington, Texas.

A small, but damaging series of five tornadoes touched down across Texas, Oklahoma, and Mississippi. A low-end EF2 tornado embedded within a line of severe storms moved through populated areas of Arlington, Texas, during the nighttime hours of November 24, damaging warehouses, and ripping a large section of roofing off of an apartment complex. Several homes, restaurants, and other businesses were damaged as well. Five people were injured, but rotation was only identified after, and because of that, no tornado warning was issued until after the tornado had dissipated. Two EF1 tornadoes also touched down in Eastern Oklahoma, one of which destroyed a mobile home near Kinta. During the morning of November 25, a brief EF1 tornado touched down on the northwestern side of Jackson, Mississippi, blowing down several trees onto homes.

== December ==
=== December 10 (South Africa) ===
On the evening of December 10, severe thunderstorms formed over South Africa, spawning a tornado that struck five villages near Middledrift, Eastern Cape, damaging or destroying dozens of homes. One person was killed in the collapse of her home and at least one other person was injured. The tornado was estimated to have been EF2 or EF3 in intensity.

=== December 16 (United States) ===
EFU	EF0	EF1	EF2	EF3	EF4	EF5
0	0	1	1	0	0	0

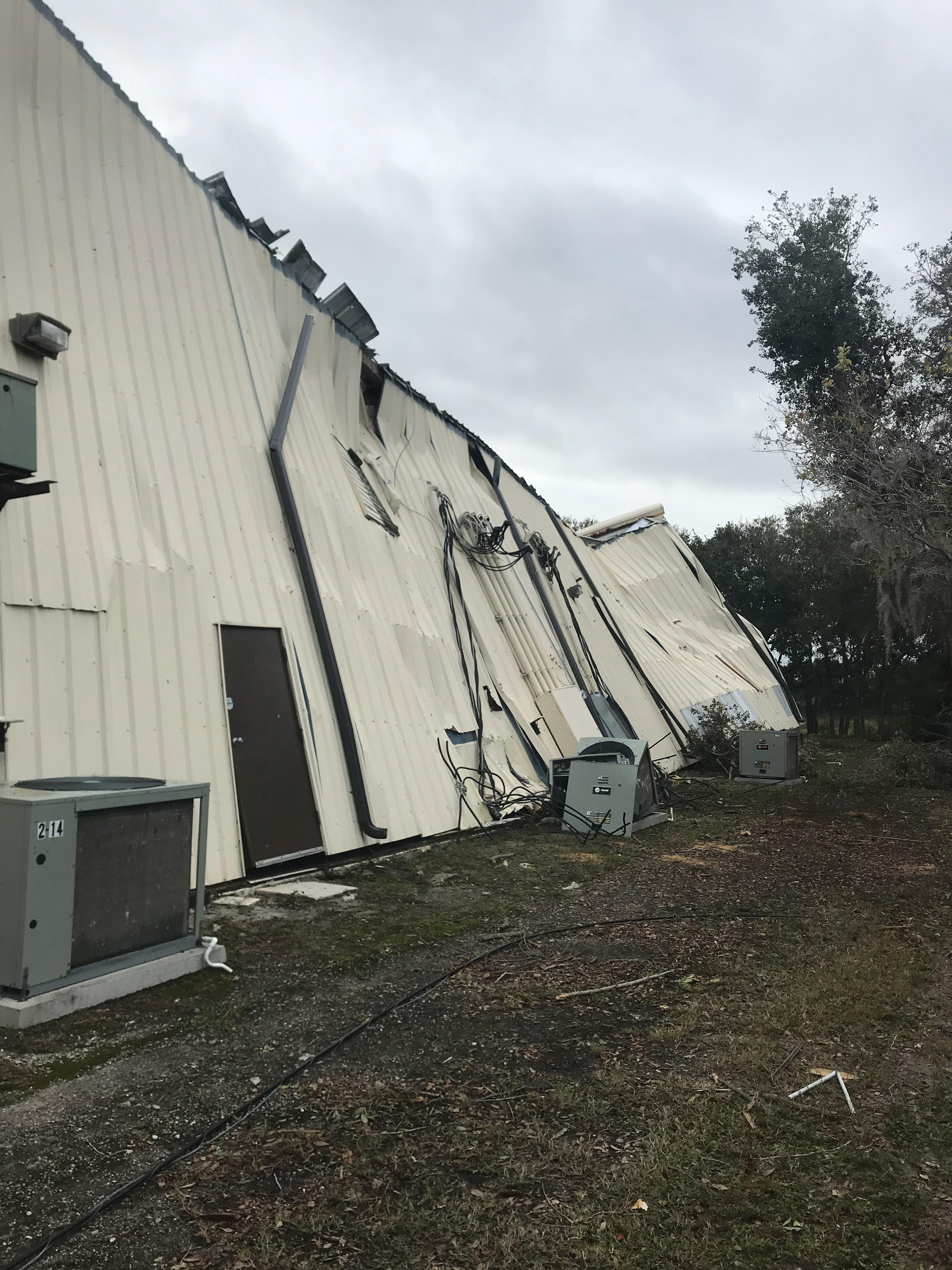
EF2 damage to a warehouse in Pinellas Park, Florida.

Two tornadoes touched down in or near the Tampa Bay area of Florida on the afternoon of December 16, the first of which was a strong, rain-wrapped EF2 tornado that impacted around 25 structures in the Pinellas Park area, with significant damage observed at some warehouses and office buildings. Two buildings were destroyed along the path, and five sustained major structural damage. The other tornado, rated EF1, touched down near Plant City and struck Gibsonia. The tornado destroyed outbuildings, downed trees, and caused roof damage to some homes.

=== December 23–24 (United States) ===
EFU	EF0	EF1	EF2	EF3	EF4	EF5
0	9	12	1	0	0	0

An outbreak of mostly weak tornadoes stuck the Southern and Eastern United States on December 23 and 24. The first tornado of the event was the strongest, producing EF2 damage southwest of Bon Wier, Texas, during the afternoon hours of December 23. Another tornado, rated EF1, touched down in Texas near Kirbyville. As a line of severe thunderstorms pushed into Mississippi, 13 tornadoes touched down across parts of the state during the nighttime hours of December 23 and in the early morning hours of the following day. Later on during December 24, multiple weak tornadoes touched down across the states of Florida, North Carolina, and Virginia. An EF1 tornado in Bradford County, Florida, injured two people. Two EF1 tornadoes touched down southwest of Suffolk, Virginia, significantly damaging homes. This was the third and fourth tornadoes to strike the area that year with the previous events occurring during Hurricane Isaias in early August. A total of 22 tornadoes touched down during this event.

== See also ==
- Weather of 2020
- Tornado
  - Tornadoes by year
  - Tornado records
  - Tornado climatology
  - Tornado myths
- List of tornado outbreaks
  - List of F5 and EF5 tornadoes
  - List of F4 and EF4 tornadoes
    - List of F4 and EF4 tornadoes (2020–present)
  - List of North American tornadoes and tornado outbreaks
  - List of 21st-century Canadian tornadoes and tornado outbreaks
  - List of European tornadoes and tornado outbreaks
  - List of tornadoes and tornado outbreaks in Asia
  - List of Southern Hemisphere tornadoes and tornado outbreaks
  - List of tornadoes striking downtown areas
  - List of tornadoes with confirmed satellite tornadoes
- Tornado intensity
  - Fujita scale
  - Enhanced Fujita scale
  - International Fujita scale
  - TORRO scale
