= 2020 Ashby–Dalton tornado =

2020 EF4 tornado in the U.S. state of Minnesota

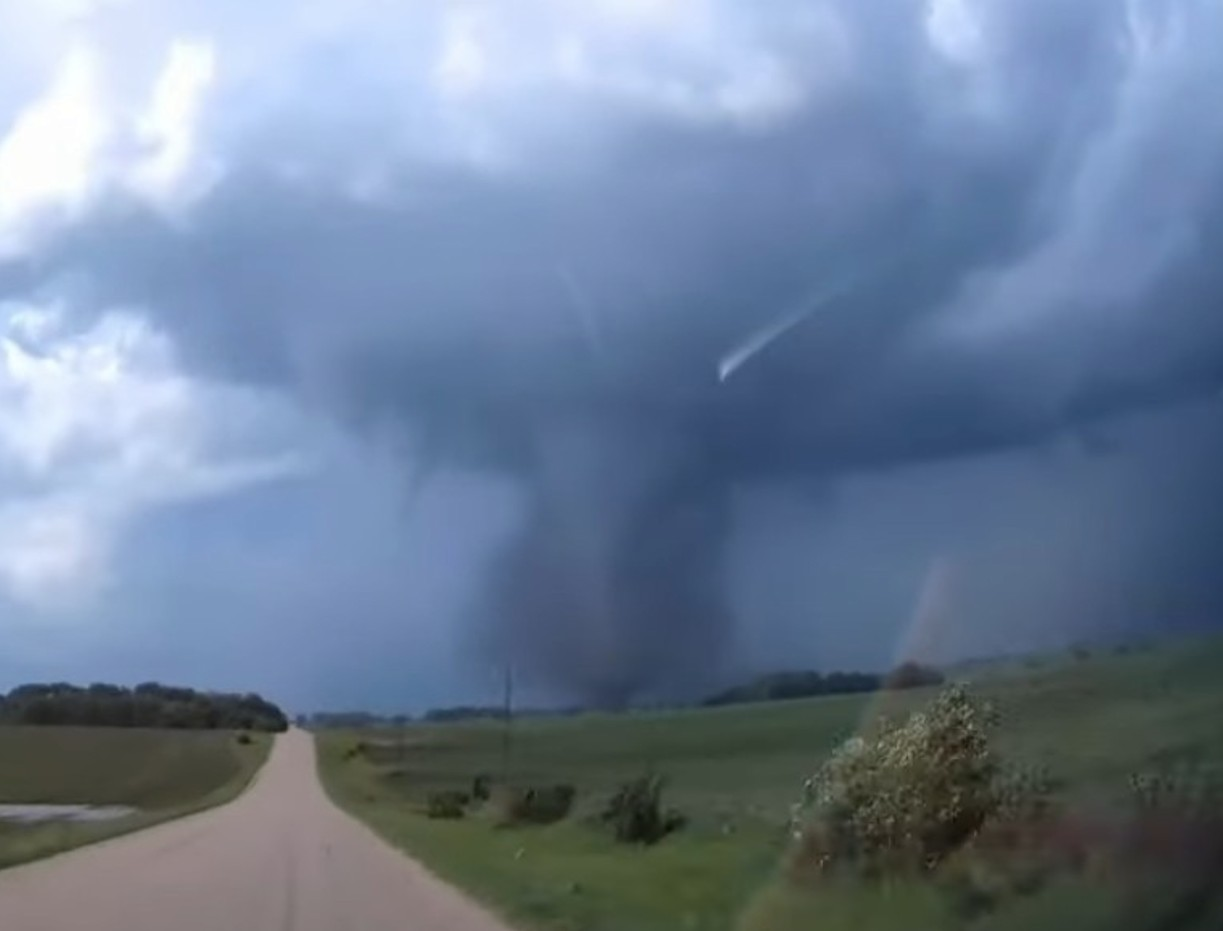
- The tornado at peak intensity in rural areas near Ashby

Meteorological history
- Formed: July 8, 2020, 5:04 p.m. CDT (UTC−06:00)
- Dissipated: July 8, 2020, 5:44 p.m. CDT (UTC−06:00)
- Duration: 40 minutes

EF4 tornado
- on the Enhanced Fujita scale
- Highest winds: 170 mph (270 km/h)

Overall effects
- Fatalities: 1
- Injuries: 2
- Damage: $1.855 million (2020 USD)
- Areas affected: Grant County & Otter Tail County, Minnesota
- Part of the tornado outbreaks of 2020

On the afternoon of July 8, 2020, a violent and deadly drillbit tornado struck the area between the towns of Ashby and Dalton, Minnesota. The National Weather Service in Grand Forks, North Dakota rated the worst of the damage from the tornado EF4 on the Enhanced Fujita scale. It was also the first F4 or EF4 tornado to occur in the United States in the month of July since the Marion, North Dakota tornado in 2004. The tornado was also used as the cover for the 2021 disaster film 13 Minutes.

This tornado decimated a 40x60 structure and over 100 trees on a homestead prior to crossing Hwy 82 and hitting the machine shop. Two boats and equipment were never found.

== Background ==
The tornado occurred in an area covered by a severe thunderstorm watch issued by the Storm Prediction Center at 4:10 p.m. the day of, which had mooted the risk of "a tornado or two" occurring. The supercell thunderstorm that spawned the tornado developed just before 5:00 p.m., and was rotating strongly enough to garner a tornado warning by 5:08 p.m. Weather spotters observing the storm passed on information to the National Weather Service office in Grand Forks, North Dakota as a funnel cloud developed, which would become the Ashby–Dalton tornado.

== Tornado summary ==
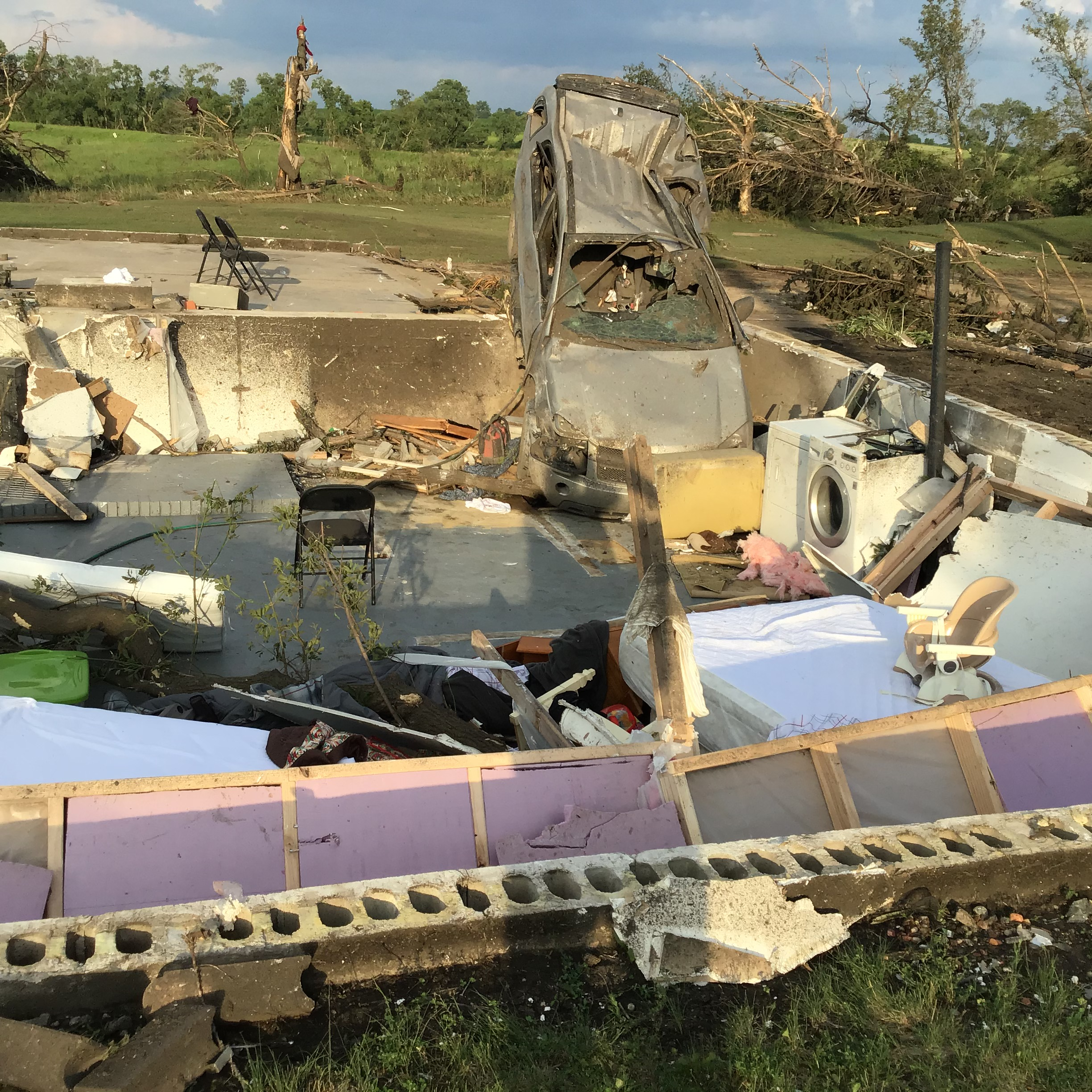
Debarked trees and low-end EF4 damage to a home near Ashby, Minnesota.

The tornado touched down at EF0 intensity, approximately six miles (9.7 km) west of Ashby, in Grant County. The tornado initially moved southeast before turning northeast. After traveling two miles (3.2 km), the tornado intensified to at least EF1 intensity as it entered Otter Tail County, where it turned due north before again turning to the northeast. The tornado briefly skipped over I-94 before touching down on the other side at EF2 intensity. This tornado decimated a 40x60 structure and over 100 trees on a homestead prior to crossing Hwy 82 and hitting the machine shop. Prior to this tornado crossing County Road 82, it quickly intensified to EF3 strength and reached its maximum width of 650 yards (590 m). Here, a machine shop was completely destroyed and swept off its foundation, killing one person. The victim, a 30-year-old man, had been taking videos of the tornado on Snapchat as it approached him and his colleague. His colleague sheltered by hanging on to the underside of a tractor in the machine shop, and survived. The National Weather Service rated the damage to the newly built machine shop EF3, with winds estimated to have been between 136–165 miles per hour (219–266 km/h).

As the tornado continued northeast, it struck a well-built two-story house on a rural homestead along 120th Street, which was decimated and completely swept off its foundation with debris widely scattered. Two people sheltered in the basement and survived with injuries after the tornado hurled debris, including an entire vehicle, into the suddenly exposed space. Two other vehicles near the house were moved 40 yards (37 m) and 300 yards (270 m) northeast respectively. One lost its engine. Nearby trees were denuded, stubbed, snapped, and lofted long distances. The homestead was judged by the National Weather Service to be the tornado's point of maximum intensity, with estimated wind speeds of at least 170 miles per hour (270 km/h) and a damage rating of EF4.

As it crossed County Road 117 the tornado produced significant damage to trees and crops, ranging from EF2 to EF3 in intensity. As the tornado began to dissipate, its movement became erratic, turning due north before turning due east and then again turning due north. While dissipating, the tornado likely maintained its strong-to-violent intensity, causing deep ground scouring. The tornado finally dissipated between 145th Street and County Road 12.

In total, the tornado killed one person, injured two others, and caused over $1.8 million (2020 USD) in damage along its nine-mile (14 km) path.

The tornado spawned from a low-precipitation thunderstorm with a high cloud base, making it remarkably visible. Multiple storm chasers captured photographs and footage of the tornado, which at times dwindled to just 10 feet (3.0 m) in width. A photograph of the tornado was used in the cover for the 2021 disaster film 13 Minutes.

== See also ==
- Weather of 2020
- List of North American tornadoes and tornado outbreaks
- List of F4 and EF4 tornadoes
  - List of F4 and EF4 tornadoes (2020–present)
