= Sergey Golubitskiy =

Russian writer and journalist

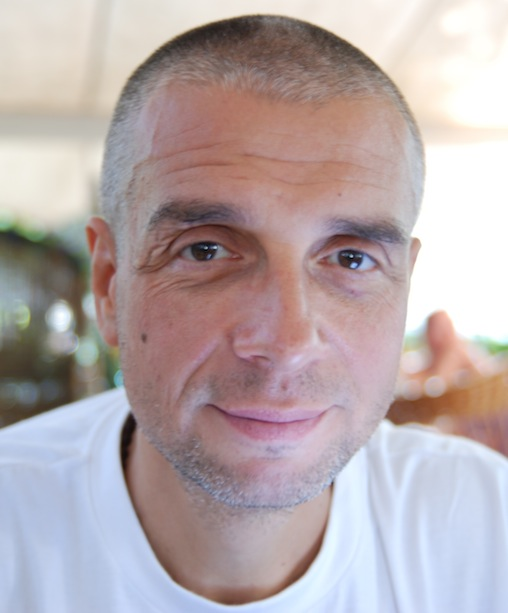

Sergey Golubitskiy (born July 11, 1962) is a linguist, writer, journalist, digital technology expert, financial analyst and financial trader.

== Career ==
In 1984 Golubutskiy graduated from the philological faculty of the Moscow State University (Department of Romance Languages). In 1989 he also defended his Ph.D. thesis.;. there on the subject of reflection of social mythology in modern novel poetics.

From 1984 to 1988 he was a junior research fellow at the Gorky Institute of World Literature of the USSR Academy of Sciences, and an interpreter from English, Portuguese and Romanian languages in the Union of Soviet Writers and the Union of Film Makers. From 1988 to 1993 Golubitskiy co-founded the Foreign Trade Co., Ltd. (Seattle, United States - Moscow, Russia), a joint US-Russian venture for the sales of pharmaceuticals and medical equipment. From 1993 to 2002 he was on the board of directors of Myriad GZS Ltd. (Seattle, USA), a company that developed educational multimedia training courses.

In 1999 he founded vCollege, the first Russian Financial Markets Trading and Investing School. Sergey Golubitskiy is the developer of the multimedia course TeachPro Internet Trading. According to the Technical Analysis Of Stocks And Commodities magazine it represented the most thorough multimedia introduction to working with the securities industry available in the American market

Since 1996 he has worked as a journalist, writing columns on business, economics, finance, and information technology for the following magazines:

- Computerra - first publication in 1996; the weekly column "Golubyatnya" - from February 1999 to March 2014
- Business Journal (He also acted as the first editor-in-chief of the magazine) – “Apparebit” - in 1999 and 2004; "The biggest swindles of the XX century" - 2003; "Other lessons" - 2004; online column - from February 2013 to July 2014).

From 2011 to 2013, Golubitskiy wrote a daily column for the online section of the National Business Network i-business.ru. Sergey Golubitskiy has also written articles and essays for magazines Home Computer, Russian Journal, Infobusiness, Cigar Clan, D’ among others. Since October 2014 he writes columns for Novaya Gazeta. Golubitskiy is a popular Russian video blogger, creating regular reviews of computer equipment, communication gadgets and consumer electronics.

In 2004 the publishing house Bestseller released Sergey Golubitskiy's 2-volume collection of essays titled "What is the name of your god? The biggest swindles of the XX century" (ISBN 5-98158-008-9, ISBN 5-98158-009-7), which describes more than twenty financial frauds that occurred in the United States: from Panama scandal to the case of Enron. The book was reprinted in 2009 (ISBN 5-98158-008-9, ISBN 5-98158-009-7). In 2005 an audio version of the book was released (with Sergey Kirsanov as narrator).

Sergey Golubitskiy has made appearances on Russian Federal television as an expert in programs including “The Philadelphia Experiment" (Top Secret TV), "Special Correspondent" (Russia TV), "Power of fact" (Culture TV). Igor Ashmanov (an expert in the field of artificial intelligence) named Sergey Golubitskiy, together with the former editor-in-chief of Computerra magazine Evgeniy Kozlovskiy, "IT Evangelists of Russian journalism". In a list of "100 creators of the post Soviet space" compiled by the community Global Intellect Monitoring, Sergey Golubitskiy was ranked 30th for his "creative interpretation of dynamically evolving reality".
