= Pavel Golubitsky =

- Павел Михайлович Голубицкий
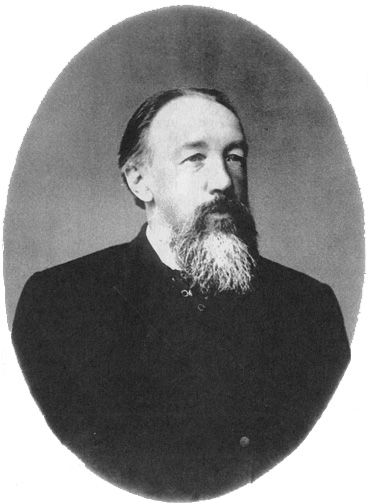
- Born: 16 (28) March 1845; Tarusa, Russian Empire
- Died: February 9, 1911 (age 65); Tarusa, Russian Empire
- Education: Saint Petersburg State University
- Known for: Development of telephony for railways
- Scientific career
- Fields: Engineer, inventor

Pavel Mikhailovich Golubitsky (Russian: Павел Михайлович Голубицкий, 16 (28) March 1845 — January 27 (9 February) 1911) was a Russian inventor in the field of telephony.

== Biography ==
From an early age Golubitsky was fascinated by electromagnetic technology. In 1870 he graduated from the Faculty of Physics and Mathematics of Saint Petersburg University, and afterwards, between 1878 and 1881, worked at the workshop of Bandera-Galician railways. In 1878 he created a telephone of original construction, the so-called phone vibrator. He continued making major inventions in the 1880s, and in 1882 designed a multi-pole phone. By this time phone lines were introduced to many cities around the world; however, their quality was poor. So in 1883, at the Munich electrical exhibition, an expert commission concluded that the existing systems were suitable for the transmission of sound to distances of only up to ten kilometers.

Golubitsky found that the low sensitivity and poor stability of the existing phones originated from the action of the magnetic field to the center of the membrane, which formed a node of vibration. He changed the phone design to removing the source of such interference. In his design the two poles of the magnet were located eccentrically relatively to the center of the membrane, so that no additional deformation was induced. In 1883 his phone was brought to Europe to connect Paris and Nancy. It was further tested by the commission of the French Navy up to a distance of 350 km, and received excellent evaluations.

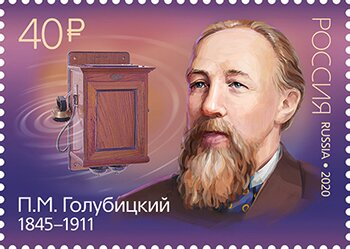
Golubitzky on a 2020 stamp of Russia

In 1883 Golubitsky developed a telephone setup for railways, which was installed at the Nikolaev railway. During the same year he improved the microphone in his setup by filling it with carbon powder. In 1884 he began testing a telephone system connecting the train operator to any railway station; this system was certified and adopted by the Russian railways in 1888. In 1885 he suggested the use of a common battery supply for multiple phones located nearby, which resulted in the appearance of telephone stations and phone networks. In 1886 he invented a commutator allowing multiple phones to use a single electrical line.

He was a personal friend of Konstantin Tsiolkovsky and tried to support his scientific endeavors.

== Books ==
- Golubitsky, P. (1885). Телефонное сообщение в Берлине [Telephony in Berlin]. Moscow.
- Golubitsky, P. (1890). Применение телефонов на железных дорогах [Application of telephony at railways]. Moscow: Rassvet.
