= Nixville, South Carolina =

- Unincorporated community
- Location within South Carolina Location within the United States
- Coordinates: 32°44′35″N 81°09′07″W
- Country: United States
- State: South Carolina
- County: Hampton
- Elevation: 105 ft (32 m)
- Time zone: UTC-5 (Eastern (EST))
  - Summer (DST): UTC-4 (EDT)
- Area codes: 803 & 839
- GNIS feature ID: 1249880

Nixville is an unincorporated community in Hampton County, South Carolina, United States. The community is on South Carolina Highway 3 5.3 miles (8.5 km) east of Estill.

On April 13, 2020, an EF4 tornado on the Enhanced Fujita Scale traveled across Hampton County, striking Nixville along its path. The tornado, part of the 2020 Easter tornado outbreak, killed five people in the Nixville and Estill areas and caused significant amount of property damage.

== See also ==
- List of F4 and EF4 tornadoes (2020–present)
