= 2020 Hampton County tornado =

2020 tornado in South Carolina, U.S.

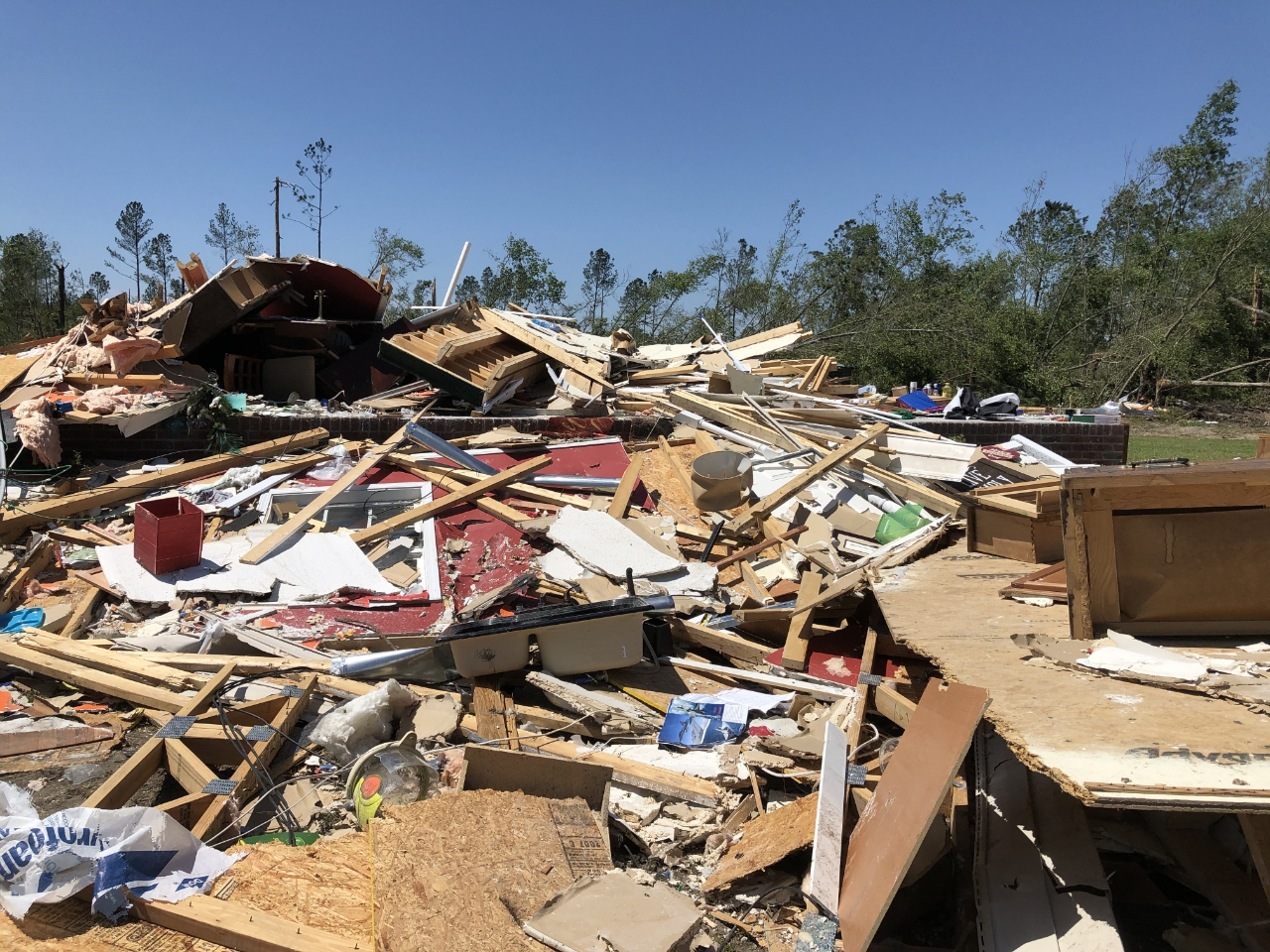
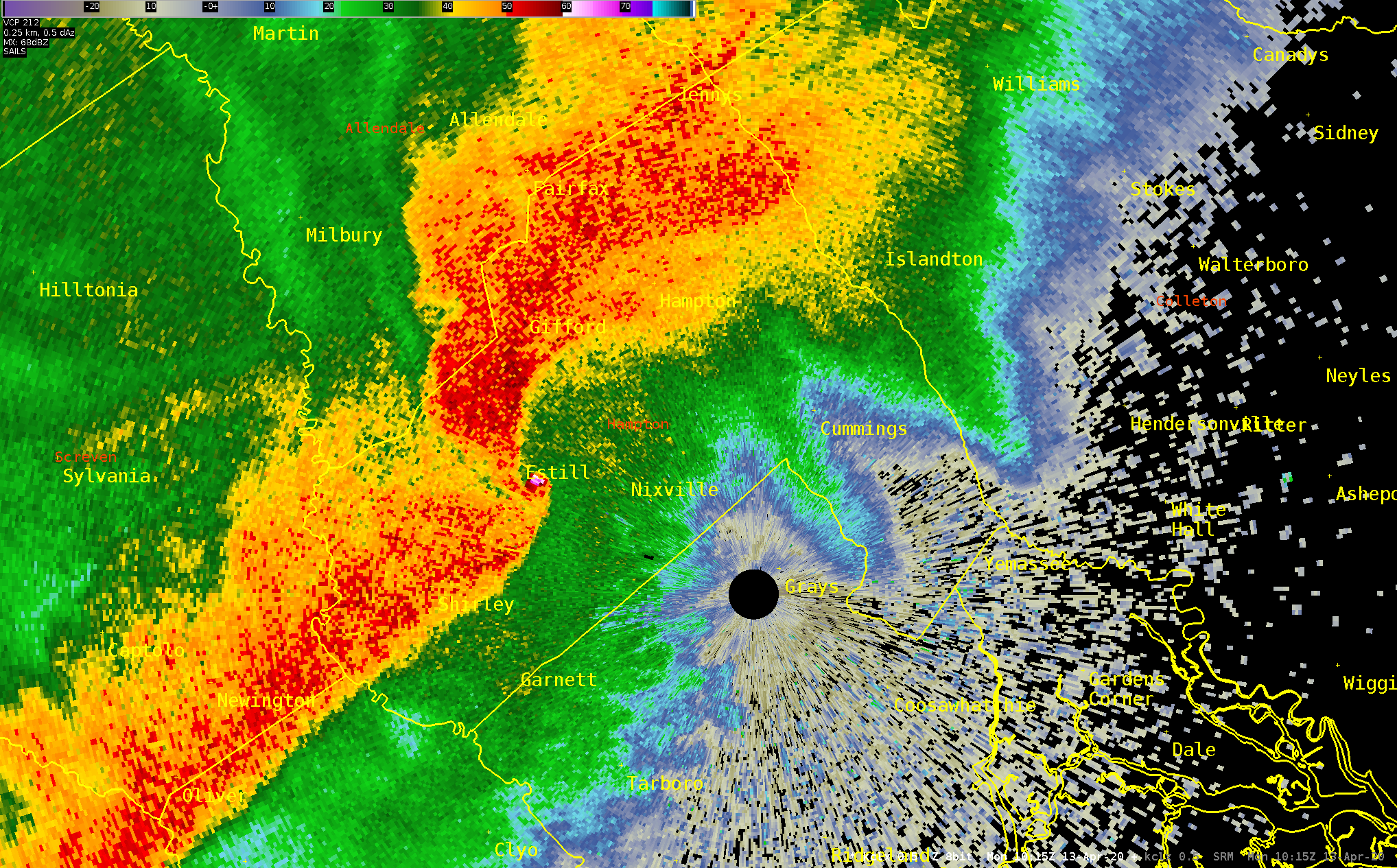
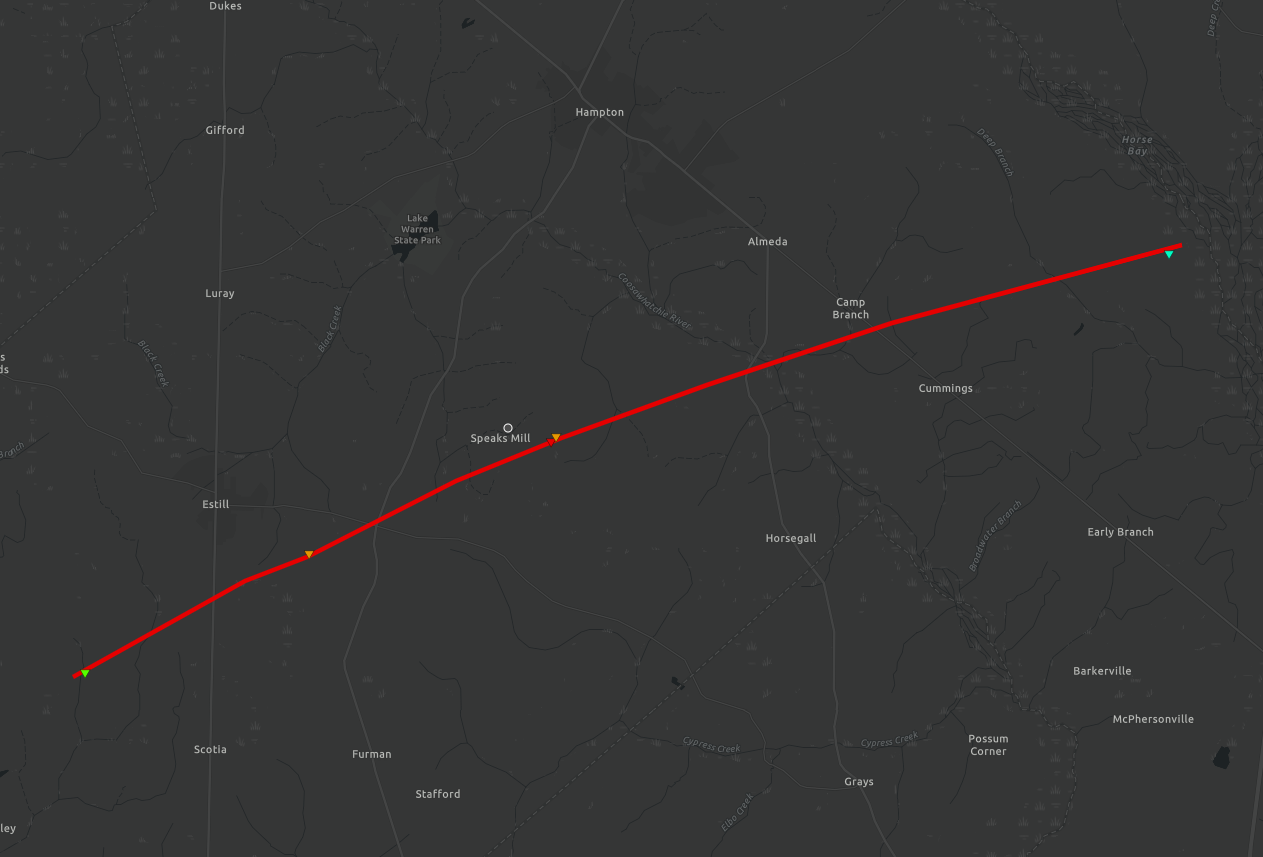
- Clockwise from Top: A two-story house leveled at EF4 intensity by the tornado; The track of the tornado; Radar imagery of the tornado near Estill

Meteorological history
- Formed: April 13, 2020, 6:10 a.m. EDT
- Dissipated: April 13, 2020, 6:37 a.m. EDT
- Duration: 27 minutes

EF4 tornado
- on the Enhanced Fujita scale
- Max width: 1,300 yards (0.74 mi; 1.2 km)
- Path length: 23.73 miles (38.19 km)
- Highest winds: 175 mph (282 km/h)

Overall effects
- Fatalities: 5
- Injuries: 60
- Damage: >$5.728 million (2020 USD)
- Areas affected: Hampton County, South Carolina, US, particularly in areas near Estill and Nixville
- Power outages: 6,200
- Houses destroyed: ~37
- Part of the 2020 Easter tornado outbreak and Tornadoes of 2020

During the early morning hours of April 13, 2020, a violent, deadly, and unusually long-tracked tornado that was part of a widespread outbreak tracked 23.73 miles (38.19 km) through portions of Hampton County, South Carolina, United States. The tornado killed five people, injured 60 others, and damaged over 100 residences, completely destroying at least 37. The tornado caused widespread power outages and significantly damaged a prison within the town of Estill, leading to the relocation of hundreds of prisoners.

Originally rated EF3 with maximum wind speeds of 165 mph (266 km/h) on the Enhanced Fujita scale, the tornado was later upgraded to an EF4 tornado after a two-story house was found to have been leveled by estimated wind speeds of 172 mph (282 km/h). It was the first F4/EF4+ tornado to occur in the Lowcountry since reliable records began in 1950, and the first F4/EF4+ tornado to occur in the state of South Carolina since November 1995.

== Meteorological synopsis ==
On the morning of April 12, 2020, the Storm Prediction Center outlined a slight risk for severe weather across much of the western portion of South Carolina. Additionally, a 5% probability for a tornado within 25 miles (40 km) of a point within the same areas was highlighted. The slight risk was later upgraded to an enhanced risk as the day progressed due to various supercells that began to develop within a squall line that was shifting eastward, with much of the western part of the state being under this category by nightfall. A 10% hatched risk (Note: A hatched risk is a 10% or greater probability of EF2+ tornadoes within 25 miles of a point within an area.) for tornadoes was also outlined for much of the same regions.

In the early morning of April 13, 2020, a squall line of thunderstorms traversed over southeast South Carolina ahead of a cold front. Conditions ahead of the storms were unusually unstable for the time of day and year, as moisture from the unusually warm Gulf of Mexico was pushing dewpoints into the upper 60s to 70 °F. These dew points along with strong vertical wind shear formed an unstable atmosphere that supported the development of organized thunderstorms and potentially supercells. As the squall line continued to travel into this favorable environment, several supercell thunderstorms intensified significantly as they separated from the main line of storms. These newly isolated supercells began to produce strong winds and went on to produce 28 tornadoes throughout South Carolina, the strongest of which being the Hampton County tornado.

== Tornado summary ==
The tornado first touched down around 3 miles (4.8 km) west-northwest of Scotia, South Carolina, at 6:10 a.m. EDT. (Note: All times listed in the article are in EDT unless stated otherwise.) It began to snap trees at EF1 strength with winds around 107 mph (172 km/h), crossed Old Orangeburg Road, and struck the Federal Correctional Institution of Estill, causing extensive damage to the facility. The tornado continued moving northeast, crossing Highway 321 just north of the intersection with Steep Bottom Road.

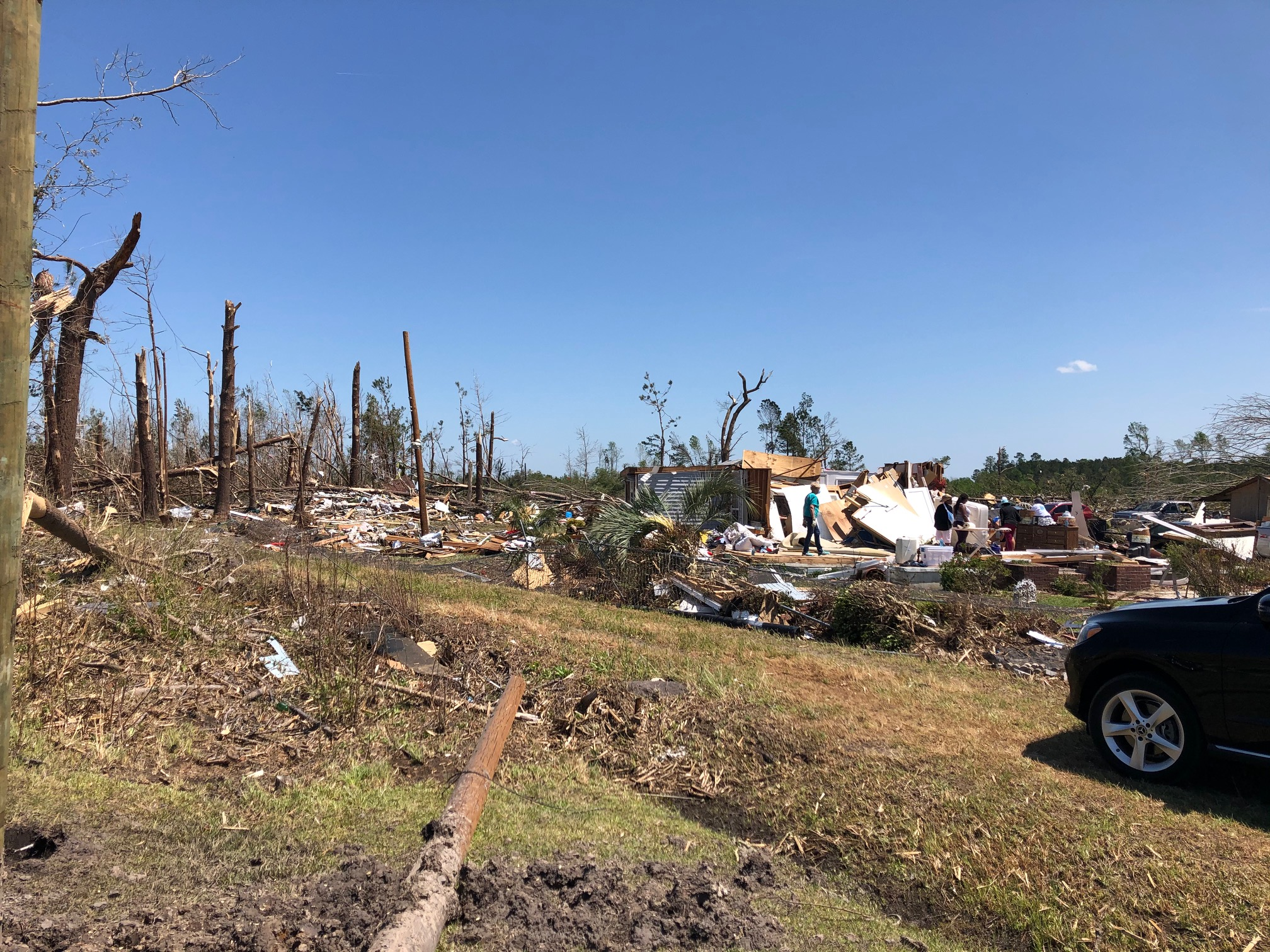
A house along Lena Expressway that was destroyed at EF3 intensity

Footage of the tornado impacting a substation in Cummings, SC

Once the tornado crossed Highway 321, it began to widen and gain substantial strength, damaging and destroying numerous residences, which consisted mostly of mobile homes, along Sprayfield Road with EF2 to EF3 strength. The worst of this damage occurred south of Estill to within Nixville, where at least six homes were completely destroyed. A neighborhood near Lena Expressway was devastated, with all but one house sustaining severe damage. One of the houses in this area was destroyed by EF3 strength with estimated wind speeds of 152 mph (244 km/h), with most of the walls collapsing. Several automobiles were lofted and rolled approximately 50 to 75 yards (46–69 meters) from their original positions. Around this time, the tornado reached its maximum width of 0.74 mile (1.2 km), inflicting damage to thousands of trees and multiple power lines.

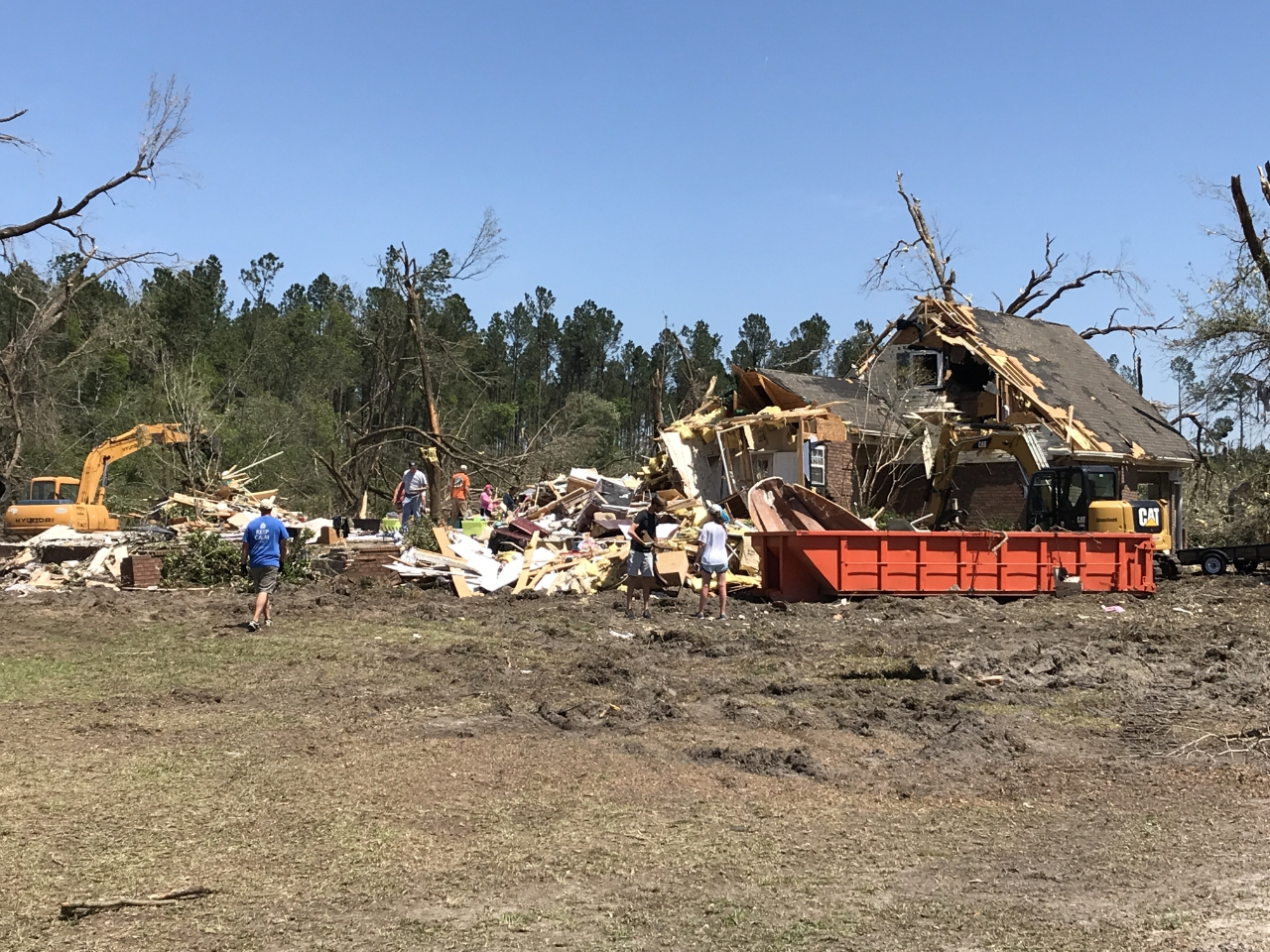
EF3 damage to a brick home near Lento Road

The tornado continued northeast before completely leveling a mobile home that was near the intersection of Highway 601 and Highway 3, claiming the lives of two people. The tornado inflicted heavy damage upon multiple residences near the intersection of Brandy Lane and Turner Expressway, including a mobile home that was leveled, killing a family of three. The tornado then reached peak intensity near Lento Road, destroying a well-constructed, two-story home and sweeping the slab clean, with debris being scattered throughout the yard. Following a damage review, the tornado was rated EF4, with estimated wind speeds of 175 mph (282 km/h) based on the near-total destruction of the house. A house across the street sustained EF3 damage inflicted by estimated wind speeds of 148 mph (238 km/h), with substantial roof and wall damage being present.

After reaching peak intensity, the tornado began to weaken while continuing to track northeastward. It crossed Highway 278 and Highway 68, striking a substation owned by Palmetto Electric near Cummings, South Carolina, at 6:27 a.m. The tornado continued for several more miles through rural land, inflicting minor damage on trees before dissipating at 6:37 a.m., around a mile from the Old Salkehatchie Highway/Archie Road intersection just before the Hampton/Colleton County line. The damage patterns left behind indicated that the tornado might have had multiple vortices.

== Aftermath ==
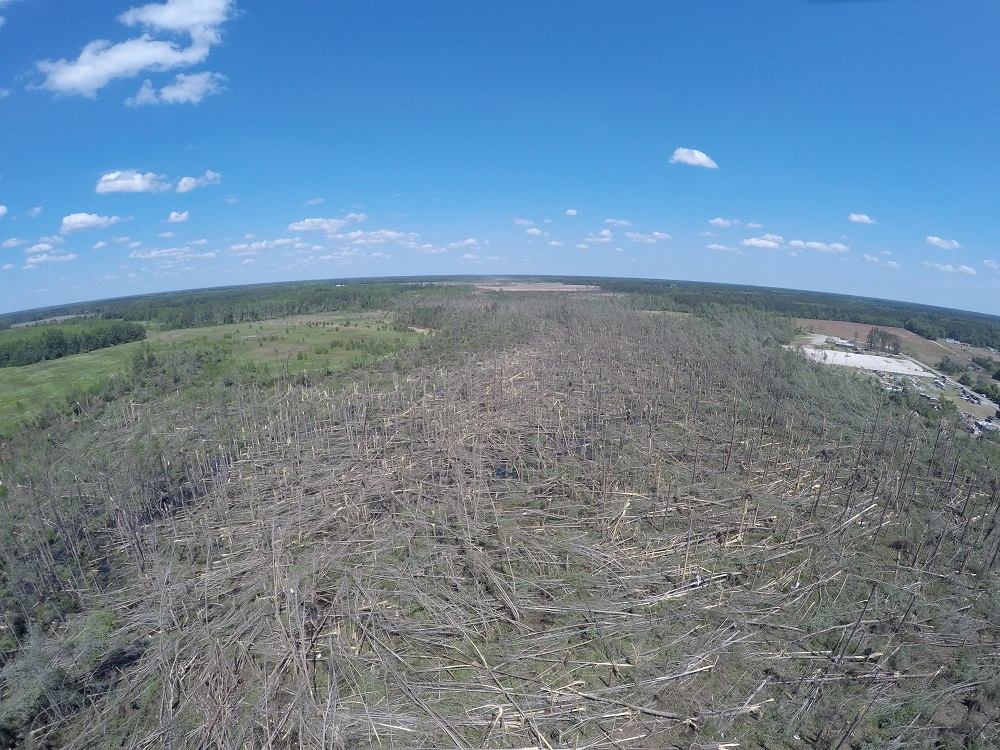
Extensive damage to a forest near Estill

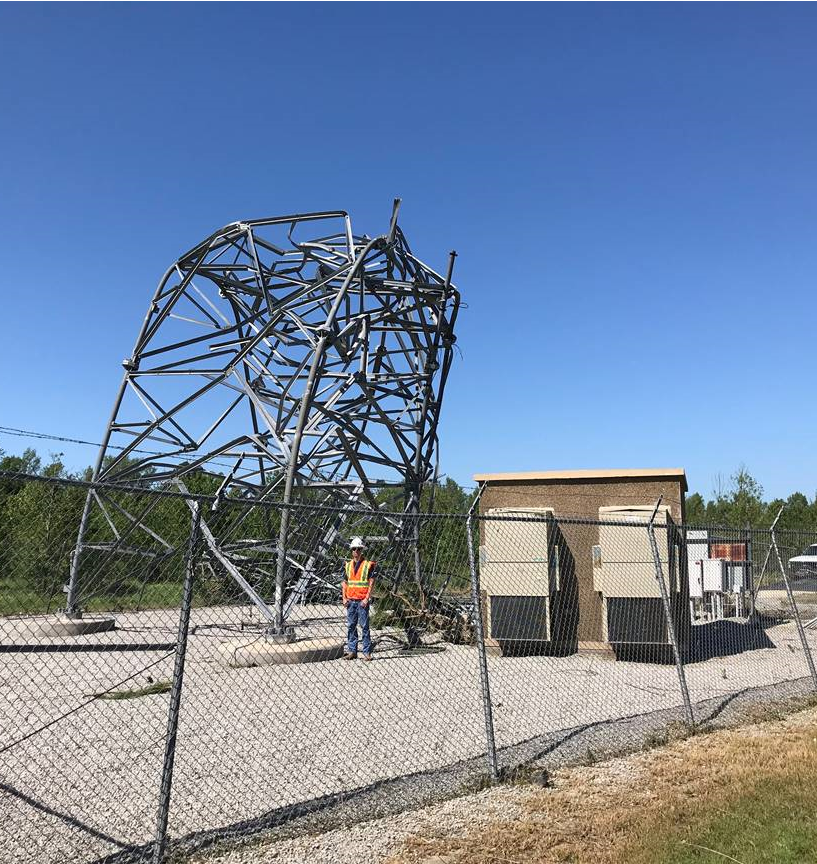
A cell tower partially collapsed by the tornado

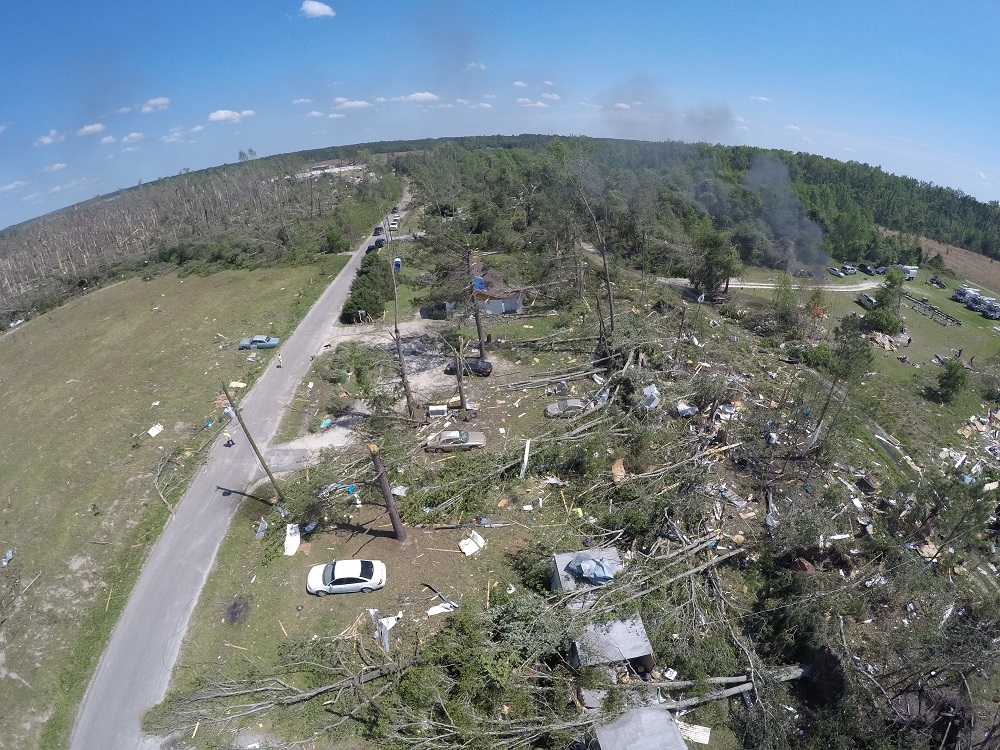
Aerial photo of tornado damage near Estill

=== Damage ===
Following the tornado, it was found that at least 23 mobile homes and 14 brick homes were completely destroyed. Around 180 homes suffered some form of damage. A neighborhood near Lena Expressway was devastated, with all but one house being destroyed. Thousands of trees were uprooted or damaged, and around 60 power poles were snapped and downed, leading to 6,200 customers being left without electricity. Substations around the affected areas also received damage. An estimated 250 people were directly affected by the tornado.

The damage sustained at the Federal Correctional Institution of Estill was so severe that over 900 prisoners were relocated to a federal penitentiary in Pennsylvania, though no injuries at this location were reported. Several automobiles were lofted, rolled, and destroyed by the tornado. Various roads had to be cleared of debris before first responders could reach the affected areas. A cell tower was found to be partially collapsed from the tornado. A bank note written in 1965 was carried by the tornado and landed 90 miles away on the front porch of a home in Cross, South Carolina. The total cost of the damage inflicted by the tornado was estimated to be in excess of $5.728 million (2020 USD). (Note: All amounts of money are in 2020 USD unless stated otherwise.)

=== Rating upgrade ===
On April 24, 2020, the National Weather Service officially upgraded the tornado from a rating of EF3 with maximum wind speeds of 165 miles per hour (266 km/h) to EF4 with maximum wind speeds of 175 miles per hour (282 km/h) after experts determined that the damage done to a well-built, two-story house along Lento Road would have required wind speeds of 172 miles per hour (277 km/h) to achieve. The house had all exterior walls, interior walls, and the roof completely removed, leaving debris scattered throughout the yard. The rating upgrade made the tornado the first F4/EF4+ on record to strike the Lowcountry since 1950, and the first F4/EF4+ in the entirety of South Carolina since the Marion County tornado on November 7, 1995.

=== Recovery efforts ===
South Carolina Governor Henry McMaster issued an emergency disaster declaration for the areas affected by the tornado. The American Red Cross opened shelters in the form of apartments and hotel rooms for those affected by the severe weather, due to the COVID-19 pandemic restricting standard shelters, and arranged accommodations to around 200 people across the state. Members of the Red Cross served over 3,400 meals and helped over 320 people impacted by the tornado, helping dozens in receiving mental health counseling.

An effort named #HamptonCountyStrong was formed as hundreds of volunteers, ranging from members of organizations to private citizens, assisted in cleanup and recovery, aiding in removing trees from roads and homes and raising money for those affected. All volunteers and emergency service workers were required to wear face masks and maintain social distancing. Many facilities, such as the Nixville Baptist Church, The Hampton County Recreation Center, and The Bull Durham Building, served as distribution points for donated goods to the people affected by the tornado.

The Nixville Baptist Church established a relief fund and accepted donations at the Nixville Baptist Church Family Center. Three of the people who were killed by the tornado were members of the church. Employees from the Fourteenth Circuit Solicitor's Office assisted in the recovery efforts, contributing food and donating items such as tarps, cleaning supplies, and other essential items. BI-LO representatives handed out more than $5,500 in gift cards to affected families.

Citizens of Hampton County, along with the South Carolina Emergency Management Division, formed the Hampton County Assistance Fund, which aimed to meet a goal of $500,000 through donations and distribute the resources to those impacted by the tornado. By August 2020, the fund reportedly exceeded the halfway mark in reaching the goal.

On May 1, 2020, President Donald Trump declared a disaster in South Carolina and approved federal aid in the counties of Aiken, Colleton, Marlboro, Oconee, Orangeburg, Pickens, and Hampton, at the request of Governor Henry McMaster following the storms. The Long Term Recovery Group and the Community Foundation of the Lowcountry made various monetary donations to help those who applied for disaster assistance. By June 23, over $7.5 million in Federal assistance was approved for storm survivors, including grants and disaster loans.

In the year following the tornado, lots were cleared of the remnants of destroyed houses, and new homes were constructed. Destroyed street lamps were replaced and yards and roads were cleared of debris. Despite the recovery, some residents moved away after the tornado.

=== Public reaction ===
On April 13, a wooden cross and memorial was installed near Browning Gate Road in Estill, where two men, Alberto Hernandez and Rene Rodriguez, were killed by the tornado. A Modelo beer can, a candle, and various other items were placed on the memorial in honor of the two individuals. A second cross was installed sometime later. Nimmer Turf, the company where the two men were employed, established a fundraiser on GoFundMe in order to provide financial assistance to their families. As of April 19, 2020, it raised $6,545 of the $20,000 goal.

Yellow ribbons were placed on numerous mailboxes throughout the Nixville community in memory of those who passed away.

USC quarterback Ryan Hilinski visited damaged areas in Hampton County and donated supplies to various drop-off points.

On April 13, 2021, a funeral service was planned at the Ginn Cemetery in Nixville, in honor of the Breland family, consisting of Jim Breland, Donna Breland, and their daughter, Kayla Breland, all of whom died from the tornado.

=== Casualties ===
Five people were killed during the tornado, and 60 others sustained injuries. One man was paralyzed by the tornado. Several individuals sustained injuries after being thrown from their mobile homes. All fatalities from the tornado occurred in mobile homes. Two of the deaths occurred in Estill within a single mobile home that was leveled by the tornado, with the other three deaths occurring in another mobile home in Nixville where a family of three was killed after the house was destroyed. The Hampton County tornado, along with several other tornadoes, caused a total of nine fatalities, making it the deadliest tornado outbreak in South Carolina since the 1984 Carolinas tornado outbreak.

List of tornado victims
| Name | Age | Location |
|---|---|---|
| Alberto Hernandez | 41 | Estill, South Carolina |
| Rene Rodriguez | 25 | Estill, South Carolina |
| Jim Breland | 59 | Nixville, South Carolina |
| Donna Breland | 56 | Nixville, South Carolina |
| Kayla Breland | 26 | Nixville, South Carolina |

== See also ==
- List of F4, EF4, and IF4 tornadoes
- List of F4, EF4, and IF4 tornadoes (2020–present)
- List of tornadoes in the 2020 Easter tornado outbreak
