= Sartinville, Mississippi =

Sartinville
- Unincorporated community
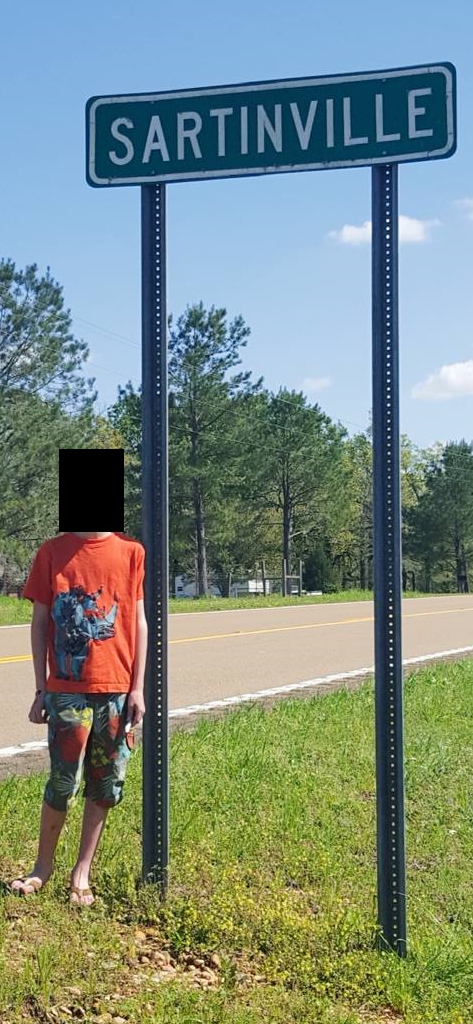
- Road sign on the road leading into Sartinville

- Location within the state of Mississippi
- Coordinates: 31°19′38″N 90°6′58″W
- Country: United States
- State: Mississippi
- County: Walthall
- Elevation: 433 ft (132 m)
- Time zone: UTC-6 (Central (CST))
  - Summer (DST): UTC-5 (CDT)
- GNIS feature ID: 692211

Sartinville (also Sartinsville) is an unincorporated community in Walthall County, Mississippi, United States. Its elevation is 433 feet (132 m). The town was struck by a violent EF4 tornado on April 12, 2020 that damaged or destroyed numerous structures, killed four people, and injured at least three others.
