= 2020 Easter tornado outbreak =

Tornado outbreak in southeast US

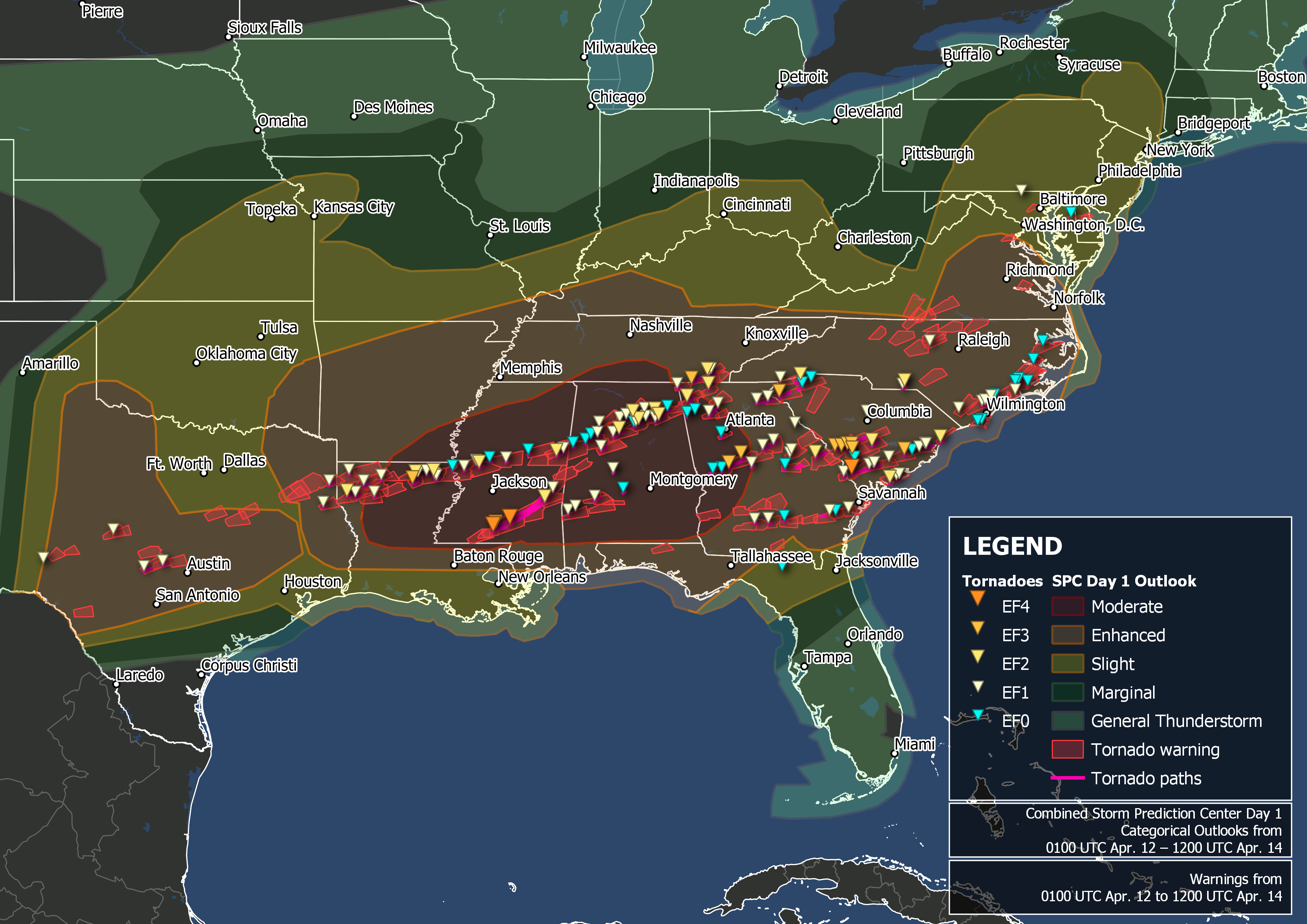
- Map of tornado warnings and confirmed tornadoes from the outbreak received by the Storm Prediction Center

Meteorological history
- Date: April 12–13, 2020

Tornado outbreak
- Tornadoes: 141
- Max. rating: EF4 tornado
- Duration: 1 day, 13 hours, 24 minutes
- Highest winds: 190 mph (310 km/h) near Bassfield, Mississippi (EF4 on April 12)
- Highest gusts: 110 mph (180 km/h) at Wallace, South Carolina on April 13 (non-tornadic)
- Largest hail: 4 in (10 cm) in diameter – Del Rio and Brackettville, Texas, on April 11

Winter storm
- Max. snowfall: 24 inches (61 cm)

Flood
- Max. rainfall: 6 inches (150 mm)

Overall effects
- Casualties: 32 fatalities (+6 non-tornadic), 257 injuries
- Damage: $3 billion (2020 USD)
- Areas affected: Southeastern United States, Mid-Atlantic
- Power outages: 1.44 million customers at one time; over 4.3 million in total
- Part of the tornado outbreaks of 2020 and the 2019–20 North American winter

A widespread and deadly tornado outbreak affected the Southeastern United States on Easter Sunday and Monday, April 12–13, 2020. Several tornadoes were responsible for prompting tornado emergencies, including the first one to be issued by the National Weather Service in Charleston, South Carolina. A large squall line formed and tracked through the mid-Atlantic on April 13, prompting more tornado warnings and watches. A total of 15 watches were produced during the course of the event, two of which were designated Particularly Dangerous Situations.

Throughout the two-day outbreak, a total of 141 tornadoes touched down across 10 states, inflicting widespread and locally catastrophic damage. The outbreak ranks 4th for producing the most tornadoes in a 24-hour period, with 132 tornadoes occurring between 14:40 UTC April 12–13; that tally is surpassed only by the Tornado outbreak of March 31 – April 1, 2023 with 134, the 1974 Super Outbreak with 148 and the 2011 Super Outbreak with 219. The strongest tornado of the outbreak occurred in Southern Mississippi, and was given a high-end EF4 damage rating after producing estimated winds of 190 mph (310 km/h), reaching a width of 2.25 mi (3.62 km), and causing eight deaths.

With a total of 32 tornado-related fatalities, the Easter outbreak was the deadliest tornado outbreak since April 27–30, 2014. To assist with recovery efforts, governors of five states declared a state of emergency. Relief efforts were complicated by social distancing requirements amid the COVID-19 pandemic, which had just begun in the United States.

== Meteorological synopsis ==
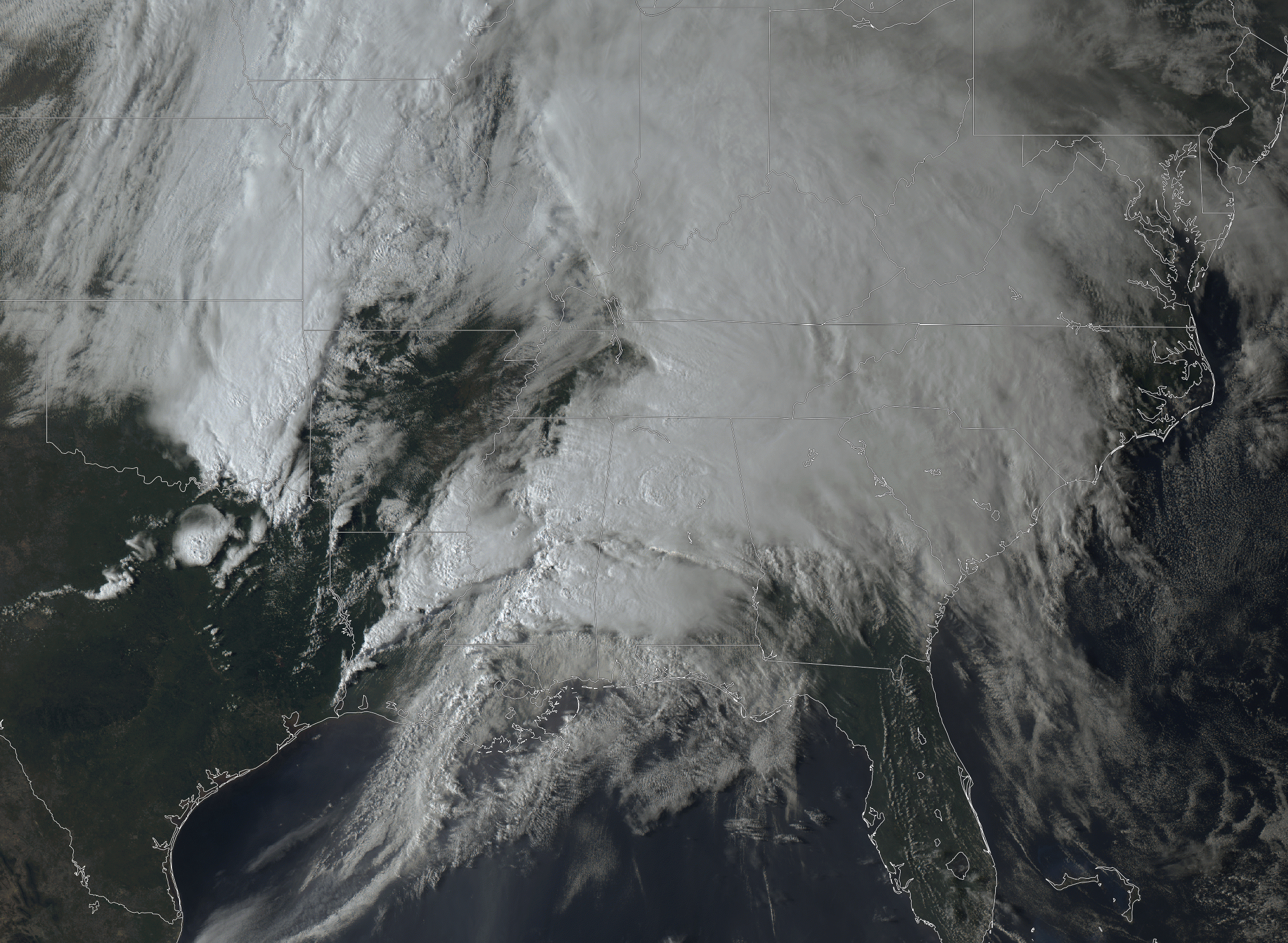
Satellite image of the extratropical cyclone responsible for the outbreak across the Southeastern United States at 21:56 UTC on April 12

=== Background ===
For weeks throughout March and into April, an expansive area of high pressure built across the Southeast United States, contributing to abnormally warm temperatures across much of the country. The United States as a whole experienced its seventeenth warmest March, continuing the pattern that persisted throughout winter. In particular, many locations along the U.S. and Mexican Gulf coasts saw record warmest temperatures for the month. Calm weather associated with the high-pressure area induced rapid warming of the Gulf of Mexico waters to their highest values in the modern record—greater than 2 °C (3.6 °F) above the 1971–2010 average—as well as a moistening of the air near the surface. Increased instability associated with anomalously warm and moist air from the Gulf of Mexico has been associated with an increased risk of severe weather and tornado activity.

=== April 12 ===
The first indications of organized severe weather came on April 8, when the Storm Prediction Center (SPC) outlined 15% probabilities for severe weather within 25 mi (40 km) of a point from central Texas eastward into the Florida Panhandle and eastern Georgia valid for April 11–12. These threat areas were later refined with the introduction of a day-3 moderate risk, the fourth of five threat levels, across northeastern Louisiana through central Alabama on April 10.istorically, the SPC issues one day-3 moderate risk every year, and half of those over the previous decade were later upgraded to High risk, the highest threat level; no upgrade was ever made for this day though. Over subsequent days, a significant mid-level shortwave trough progressed eastward across the United States. By the pre-dawn hours of April 12, mid-level cooling associated with the feature overspread the Edwards Plateau, Hill Country, and much of central Texas. Accordingly, an intense line of severe thunderstorms developed along a dry line while vigorous convective development formed farther east. These thunderstorms were initially isolated in nature but soon coalesced into a mesoscale convective system as they encountered an enhanced corridor of warm air streaming northward, as well as very strong wind shear. These initial storms produced scattered weak tornadoes in Texas during the early stages of the outbreak. This storm complex progressed across northern Louisiana through the late morning and early afternoon hours, and embedded circulations within the line began producing strong tornadoes, contributing to multiple tornado debris signatures visible on radar. The first strong tornado as well as the first one to cause casualties was in Desoto Parish, where an EF2 tornado destroyed manufactured homes and damaged trees and homes, injuring two people. The first intense and notable tornado was an EF3 tornado that triggered a tornado emergency as it moved through downtown Monroe, and damaging or destroying numerous homes, but there were no casualties. To the north, a second EF3 tornado near Sterlington caused extensive tree damage. In advance of the line, a lifting warm front aided in the formation of a very moist, highly unstable, and highly sheared environment across northeastern Louisiana and much of Mississippi. Accordingly, the SPC issued a particularly dangerous situation tornado watch into the late evening hours.

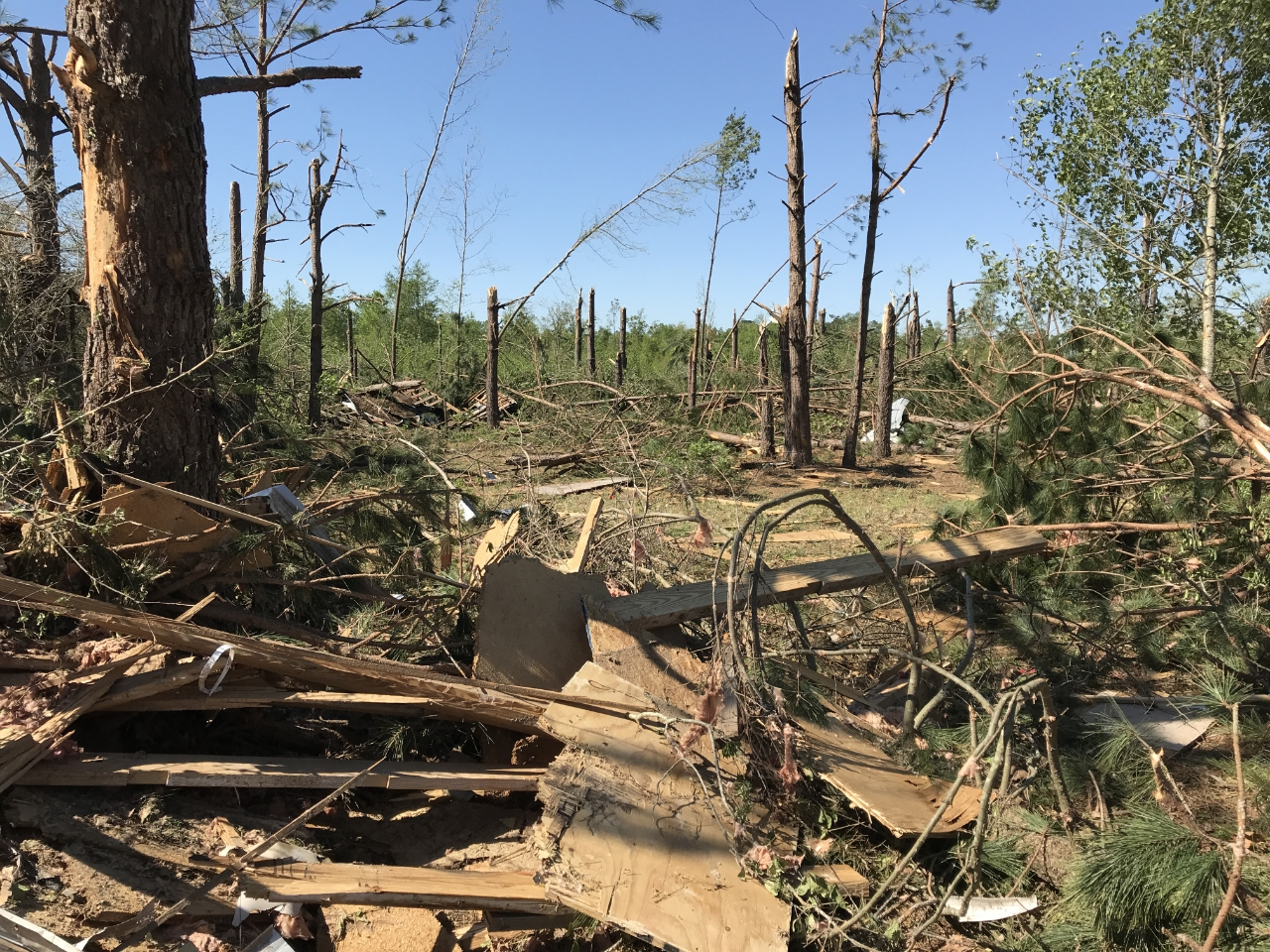
Severe damage to a grove of trees, including partial debarking, near Livingston, South Carolina, from an EF3 tornado on the morning of April 13.

A weather balloon launch from Jackson, Mississippi, at 18:00 UTC revealed the presence of a capping inversion across the region. This cap was expected to weaken across central Mississippi, while forecasters expressed more uncertainty about its longevity across southern Mississippi and Louisiana. As a small area of low pressure progressed across northwestern Mississippi, it caused surface winds to turn out of the east-southeast, enhancing the potential for tornadoes. As a cluster of storms across central Mississippi progressed toward the northeast, it began to reintensify and develop embedded supercell characteristics with an attendant threat of strong tornadoes. Farther south, two distinct supercells developed within an environment where long-tracked, significant tornadoes were favored, both exhibiting extremely strong rotation and distinct debris signatures. Based on previous storm structures in similar environments, the SPC remarked that "this is an exceptionally rare event" and estimated tornadic winds of 170–205 mph (274–330 km/h) on the first supercell, consistent with a tornado of EF4 or EF5 intensity. After conducting damage surveys, meteorologists identified two violent tornadoes with the first supercell, one that killed four people and injured three others near Sartinville to southwest of Bassfield, and a second that killed eight people and injured 95 others from south of Bassfield to Pachuta, both of EF4 intensity. A long-tracked EF3 tornado was identified with the second supercell that tracked behind the first one, producing significant damage near Oak Vale and Carson, injuring two people. The first supercell also produced two other tornadoes after the second EF4 tornado dissipated, including an EF2 tornado that passed near Stonewall and Enterprise that destroyed a mobile home and heavily damaged a home and a church, and snapped numerous trees. The second supercell also produced a tornado, which was rated EF1, as it passed Enterprise. Both supercells then weakened and merged with a squall line after that.

Throughout the evening hours, the severe weather and tornado risk shifted eastward into Alabama, as the initial cluster of severe storms with numerous embedded semi-discrete supercells and comma-head circulation moved across north-central Alabama, contributing to multiple strong tornadoes. This included a damaging rain wrapped EF2 tornado that struck a residential area at the southwestern outskirts of Boaz, injuring three people. Later, a high-end EF1 tornado caused major damage and three injuries in Carbon Hill. This feature continued into northwestern Georgia, maintaining its well-defined structure in spite of a marginally unstable environment. In the end, this complex produced 43 tornadoes alone, including nine rated EF2 and two rated EF3. A high-end EF2 tornado spawned by an isolated supercell thunderstorm ahead of the main complex carved a path northwest of Chatsworth, Georgia, and through the small community of Sumac, killing eight people and injuring 24 others. While local enhancement of storm activity occurred within an extensive line of convection in central Alabama, dewpoints rose in the wake of the earlier storm complex across northern Georgia and southeastern Tennessee, further boosting instability values in the presence of extremely strong wind shear. An EF3 tornado embedded within the main line of storms killed two people and injured 18 others in the eastern suburbs and neighborhoods of Chattanooga, Tennessee. The same storm also produced an EF2 tornado that damaged or destroyed numerous homes and mobile homes in eastern Cleveland, Tennessee, injuring six people.

=== April 13 ===
During the early-morning hours of April 13, the pre-frontal squall line shifted eastward into eastern Georgia and the Carolinas, with numerous well-organized embedded supercells forming within the line, producing numerous tornadoes across the region in an event known as the Central Savannah River outbreak. An EF1 tornado passed through Cartersville, Georgia, killing one person when a tree fell on a house while causing two additional injuries elsewhere. An EF3 tornado that damaged or destroyed multiple homes was confirmed south of Thomaston to northwest of Redbone, Georgia, with one home being pushed off its foundation and into the middle of a road. The same circulation produced another EF3 tornado near Forsyth, injuring one person and damaging or destroying numerous structures and vehicles, including aircraft. A third EF3 tornado from south-southeast of Westminster to west of Central, South Carolina in South Carolina killed one person and caused major damage in Seneca. Yet another EF3 tornado tracked from east-northeast of Elko to west-southwest of St. Matthews in South Carolina and caused two more fatalities. The most significant tornado to occur on April 13 was a multiple-vortex EF4 tornado that killed five people near the South Carolina towns of Estill and Nixville. This tornado was part of a tornado family that produced 12 tornadoes, including an EF1 tornado that killed one person in Walterboro. A total of eight separate EF3 tornadoes were confirmed across Georgia and South Carolina during this portion of the outbreak. Through the late morning hours of April 13, the line of intense thunderstorms continued eastward and intensified given marginal daytime heating, a steady stream of rich moisture, and intense low-level wind shear. The SPC had already outlined an Enhanced risk of severe weather along the U.S. East Coast from southeastern Georgia northward into northern Virginia and damaging winds and tornadoes were reported until the storms moved offshore. Later, more severe storms formed over the Appalachian Mountains and moved into the Northeast megalopolis, where a slight risk had been issued. These storms produced large swaths of damaging winds and two weak tornadoes throughout this area for the rest of day until the outbreak came to an end.

== Confirmed tornadoes ==
Confirmed tornadoes by Enhanced Fujita rating
EFU	EF0	EF1	EF2	EF3	EF4	EF5	Total
0	32	74	19	13	3	0	141

=== Monroe, Louisiana ===
Monroe, Louisiana
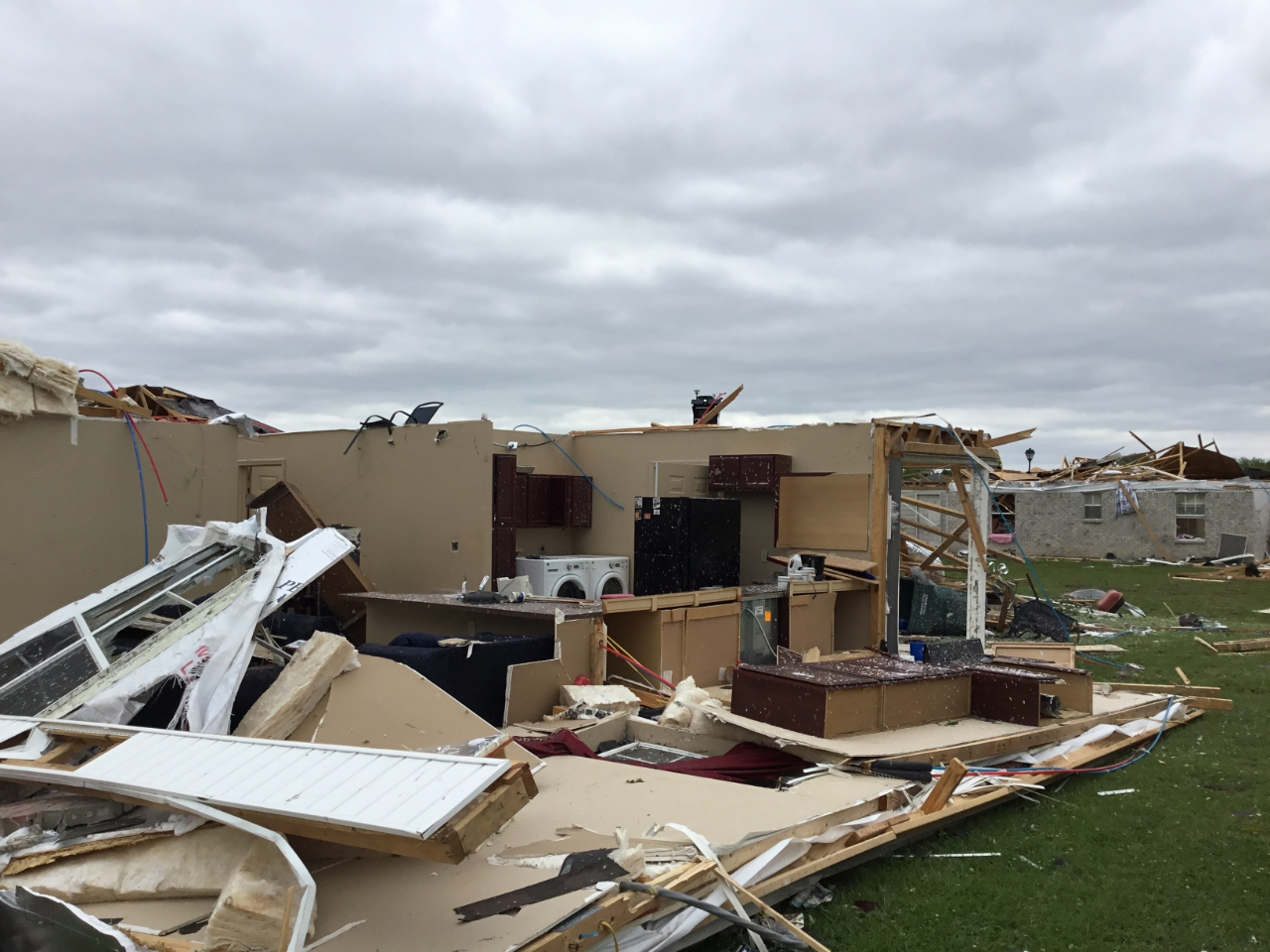
- Low-end EF3 damage to a home in Monroe, Louisiana.

Meteorological history
- Formed: April 12, 2020, 11:36 a.m. CDT (UTC−05:00)
- Dissipated: April 12, 2020, 11:45 a.m. CDT (UTC−05:00)
- Duration: 9 minutes

EF3 tornado
- on the Enhanced Fujita scale
- Highest winds: 140 mph (230 km/h)

Overall effects
- Injuries: 0
- Damage: $250 million (2020 USD)

This intense tornado touched down south-southwest of Brownsville-Bawcomville, Louisiana at 11:36 a.m. CDT (16:36 UTC). It moved northeast at EF1 strength, snapping or uprooting numerous trees at the intersection of Brown Street and Evergreen Street and in neighborhoods to the northeast as the tornado moved toward Monroe, with several trees landing on homes. A metal building had its overhead door blown out, several manufactured homes along Sandal Street were damaged, and a trailer was tipped over along LA 34. The tornado then reached EF2 strength as it moved into West Monroe, snapping power poles in this area, breaking metal trusses at a paper mill, and blowing over a wood chip conveyor belt. Maintaining EF2 intensity, the tornado crossed the Ouachita River two times, and impacted Riverbend Drive. In this area, many trees were snapped, a home lost its roof, and another home sustained partial wall collapse. The tornado then crossed the Ouachita River a third time and impacted neighborhoods along Business US 165 and LA 15 to the south of downtown Monroe, where a tornado emergency was issued due to a large debris ball showing up on radar. Multiple homes in this area had roofs torn off and a few of them also sustained some collapse of exterior walls. A large two-story home lost all of its roof, and an art museum also had severe roof damage. Numerous other homes in this area sustained roofing and window damage, and many trees and power poles were downed. Continuing northeast of Railroad Avenue, the tornado momentarily weakened to EF1 intensity as moved through additional residential areas, downing more trees and damaging the roofs of homes. Regaining EF2 strength, the tornado crossed I-20 at US 165, heavily damaging a metal building and snapping several power poles along LA 594. The tornado then reached its peak intensity as several well-built homes in a subdivision along Orchid Drive had roofs ripped off and multiple exterior walls collapsed, and numerous other homes sustained varying degrees of damage. Peak damage in this subdivision ranged from high-end EF2 to low-end EF3. Sporadic EF1 damage was observed as the tornado proceeded to cross Powell Avenue, where homes sustained partial roof loss and trees were damaged. Northeast of this area, the tornado strengthened back to EF2 intensity as it completely destroyed a metal hangar at Monroe Regional Airport. A large metal building was also heavily damaged in this area before the tornado abruptly lifted and dissipated as it crossed an airport runway at 11:45 a.m. CDT (16:45 UTC).

The tornado lasted for nine minutes, traveled 8.01 miles (12.89 km), and was given a rating of low-end EF3. Throughout Ouachita Parish, a total of 458 homes were impacted; 23 were destroyed, 108 had major damage, and 243 had minor damage. Losses totaled $250 million with the damage to the airport estimated at $25–30 million of that total. Despite the extensive damage, there were no casualties from the tornado.

=== Hope–Sartinville–Bassfield, Mississippi ===
Hope–Sartinville–Bassfield, Mississippi
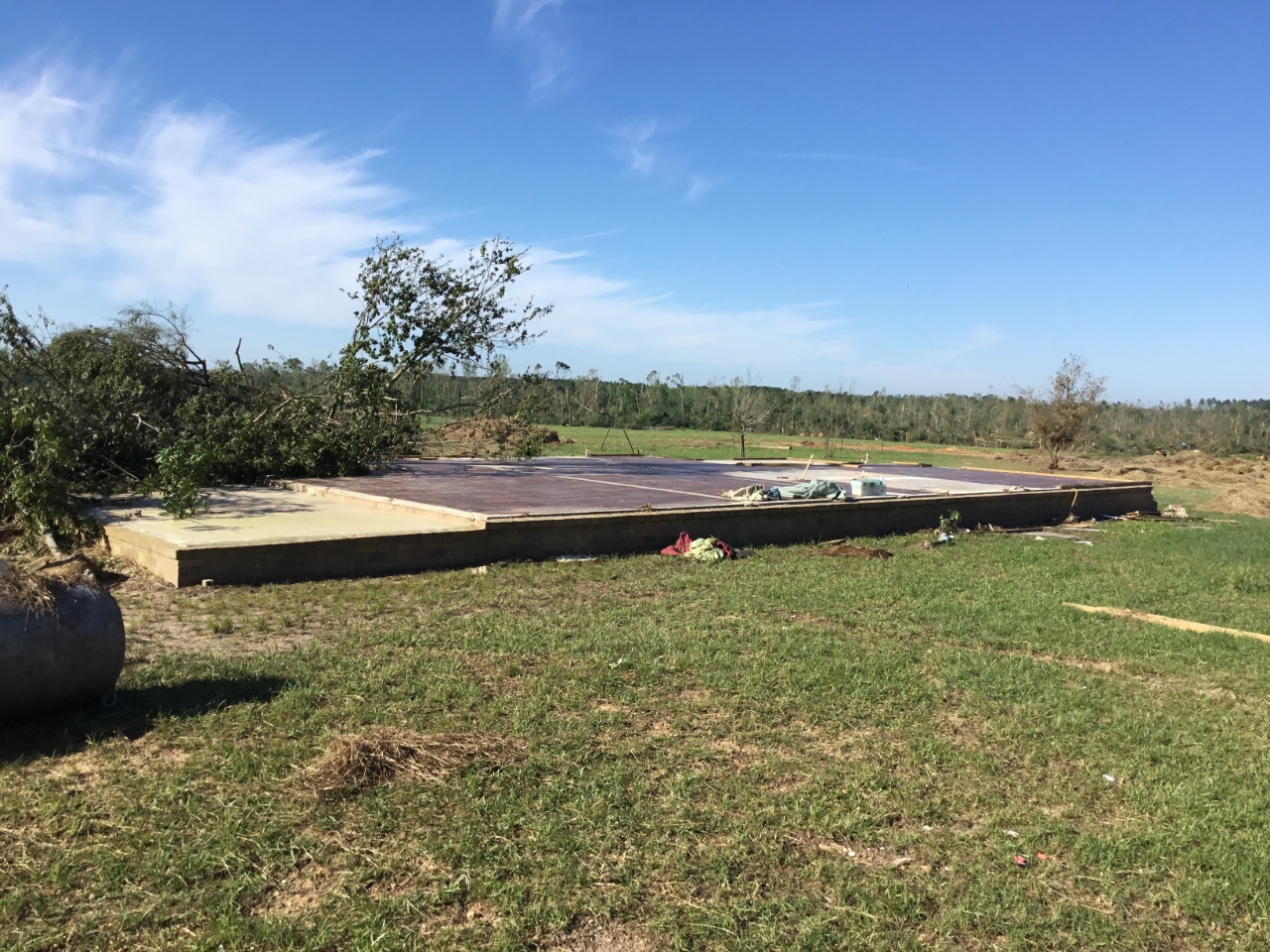
- Well-anchored home swept away near Sartinville, Mississppi at EF4 intensity.

Meteorological history
- Formed: April 12, 2020, 3:39 p.m. CDT (UTC−05:00)
- Dissipated: April 12, 2020, 4:06 p.m. CDT (UTC−05:00)
- Duration: 27 minutes

EF4 tornado
- on the Enhanced Fujita scale
- Highest winds: 170 mph (270 km/h)

Overall effects
- Fatalities: 4
- Injuries: 3

This large and violent wedge tornado touched down just southwest of the rural Walthall County, Mississippi community of Hope, near Jefferson Road and to the east of the intersection with Jack Foil Road at 3:39 p.m. CDT (20:39 UTC). The tornado quickly became strong as it moved northeastward through Hope, producing low-end EF2 damage. Rapid strengthening and widening continued as the tornado inflicted more significant damage while crossing MS 27. As it passed to the east of Sartinville, the tornado reached its peak intensity as it completely swept away a house near James Ratcliff Road, leaving only a bare foundation slab behind. This house was secured to its foundation with anchor bolts, which were found bent, though nearby trees did not sustain damage consistent with a tornado stronger than low-end EF4 strength. One tree on the property was ripped out the ground and thrown several feet. A nearby brick house was leveled with only a pile of debris remaining, though it was not well-anchored, and a high-end EF3 rating was applied at that location. Northeast of this area, the tornado weakened back to EF2 strength as it snapped numerous trees, damaged several small cinder-block buildings, tore the roof off a home, and rolled a tied-down mobile home as it crossed East Sartinville Road. Crossing into the southern part of Lawrence County, the tornado reintensified to EF3 strength, denuding and partially debarking numerous trees. A double-wide mobile home was obliterated along Tynes Ainsworth Road, with the metal frame lofted and thrown 150 yards (140 m). A large storage garage was completely swept away in this area as well. The tornado then weakened back to EF2 intensity as it crossed Felix Road and Holmes Road, as several power poles were snapped, and a large swath of trees was flattened. A one-story house at the edge of the damage path had shingles ripped off as well. EF2 damage to trees and power poles continued through unpopulated areas of northwestern Marion County until the tornado crossed River Road and Cooper Road, where EF1 tree damage occurred. Continuing into the southwestern corner of Jefferson Davis County, the weakening tornado produced EF0 to EF1 tree and tree limb damage before dissipating at Joe Dyess Road, several miles to the southwest of Bassfield, Mississippi at 4:06 p.m. CDT (21:06 UTC).

This tornado was on the ground for 21.17 miles (34.07 km) and reached a peak width of 1,936 yards (1,770 m), killing four people and injuring at least three others. It was rated as a low-end EF4, with winds estimated at 170 mph (270 km/h).

=== Bassfield–Seminary–Soso–Moss–Pachuta, Mississippi ===
Bassfield–Seminary–Soso–Moss–Pachuta, Mississippi
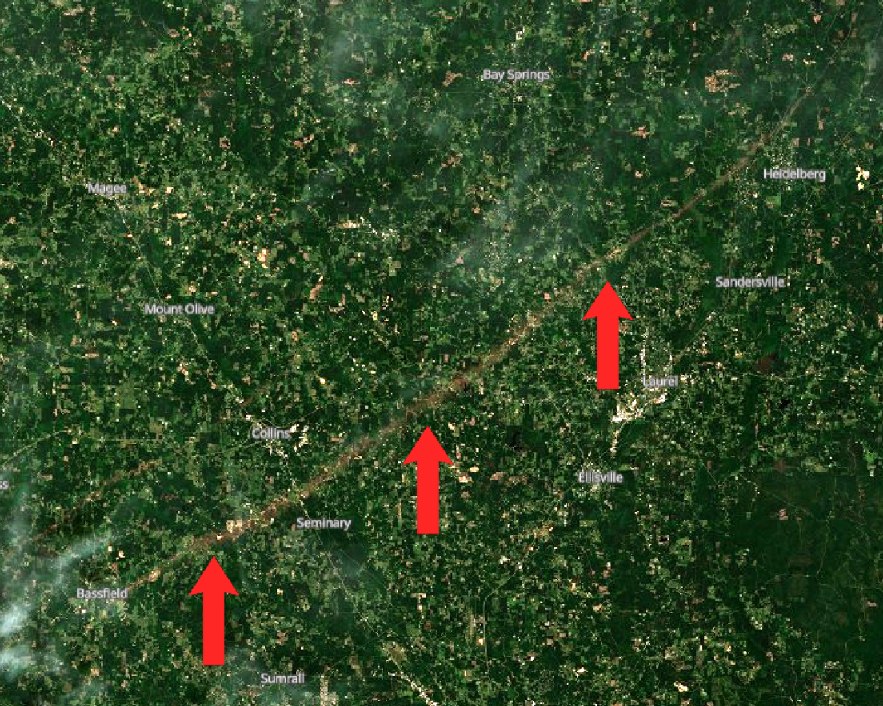
- Sentinel-2 satellite imagery of a scar left behind across southern Mississippi by the tornado.

Meteorological history
- Formed: April 12, 2020, 4:12 p.m. CDT (UTC−05:00)
- Dissipated: April 12, 2020, 5:28 p.m. CDT (UTC−05:00)
- Duration: 1 hour, 16 minutes

EF4 tornado
- on the Enhanced Fujita scale
- Highest winds: 190 mph (310 km/h)

Overall effects
- Fatalities: 8
- Injuries: 99

Six minutes after the first EF4 tornado lifted far southwest of Bassfield, the same parent supercell thunderstorm produced this violent, long-tracked and enormous wedge tornado that touched down just south-southwest of the town in Jefferson Davis County at 4:12 p.m. CDT (21:12 UTC). A tornado emergency remained in effect for Bassfield due to the first tornado, giving substantial warning as the second developed. The first area of damage occurred along Bassfield Cemetery Road and Bass Road, where trees and tree limbs were downed at EF0 to EF1 intensity. The tornado quickly intensified as it continued to the northeast and crossed Ray Hathorn Road and South Williamsburg Road, reaching EF2 strength as it snapped and uprooted numerous large trees. Mainly EF2 damage continued within the vicinity of MS 42 just southeast of Bassfield as multiple homes sustained partial to total roof loss, and a mobile home was rolled. A small area of low-end EF3 damage along Hosey Mikel Road, where a mobile home was obliterated and swept away, with little debris recovered. Northeast of this point, the tornado became violent and expanded to one mile (1.6 km) wide, as EF4-level tree damage began to occur along Pitts Lane and Reese Road. Every tree in this area was snapped or sustained severe debarking, and another mobile home was obliterated, with the damage to that structure rated EF3. A house farther away from the center of the path sustained severe roof damage as well. EF4 tree damage continued to the northeast through the intersection of Graves Key Road and Harper Road, and one tree was found with a metal mobile home frame wrapped around it. Four people were killed in this area as Mama D's, a small restaurant housed in a cinder-block building, was leveled and swept away, with the concrete slab foundation largely swept clean of debris. This structure was not well-anchored, and a high-end EF3 rating was applied to the restaurant. Cars in this area were thrown and mangled, and several homes sustained EF2 to EF3 damage, sustaining roof and exterior wall loss.

The tornado then reached its peak strength as it tore through the rural community of Cantwell Mill, where a large, anchor-bolted cabin was completely swept away and reduced to a bare slab, with little debris recovered. While this structure was well-anchored, surveyors noted some minor structural defects including lack of external sheathing and flawed stud-to-sill plate nailing, while trees in the immediate vicinity sustained only partial debarking and no significant ground scouring occurred. It was also noted that a vehicle likely impacted the structure as the tornado struck. Due to these limiting factors, a high-end EF4 rating was applied as a result. A truck was lofted from this location and thrown 300 yards (270 m) into a field as well, leaving it mangled beyond recognition. Extreme EF4-level tree damage continued to the northeast, along Willie Fortenberry Road, Davis Road, and Kings Road as entire groves of large trees were mowed down and completely stripped clean of all bark, livestock was killed, and vehicles were thrown hundreds of yards and destroyed. A few homes farther away from the center of the path sustained EF2 to EF3 damage, with their roofs ripped off and exterior walls collapsed.

The massive tornado continued to grow in size as it entered Covington County, reaching its peak width of 2.25 miles (3.62 km) west of Seminary. An entire forest was leveled with significant debarking to some trees, while thousands to millions of other trees were damaged. Multiple vortices and an intense core were evident in the damage path, approximately 23–30 chicken houses were completely destroyed, and farmers reported that 60 cattle were killed. A manufactured home was obliterated, frame homes had roofs ripped off and exterior walls collapsed, and multiple vehicles were thrown and rolled along this segment of the path, and most of the damage was rated EF3. However, one small pocket of low-end EF4 damage occurred along Cold Springs Road, where a well-built brick house was almost entirely leveled. A tornado emergency was extended east-northeast downwind of the storm for Seminary and Collins, Mississippi; one of several issued for the storm. The Storm Prediction Center issued a mesoscale discussion stating that a tornado with winds of 170–205 mph (274–330 km/h) was likely ongoing, and that it was an 'exceptionally rare event'. The tornado then narrowed to 1.7 miles (2.7 km), but continued to produce EF3 damage as it crossed US 49 to the north-northwest of Seminary. Numerous trees were snapped and partially debarked, and two homes sustained collapse of their exterior walls in this area, while two others had much of their roofs ripped off. EF2 to EF3 damage continued as the tornado moved through rural areas to the northeast of Seminary, moving into Jones County and crossing US 84. Damage along this portion of the path consisted of mobile homes, metal buildings, outbuildings, and poultry barns destroyed, along with frame homes sustaining roof and exterior wall loss. Massive tree damage continued to occur, with large swaths of trees snapped, denuded, and partially debarked.

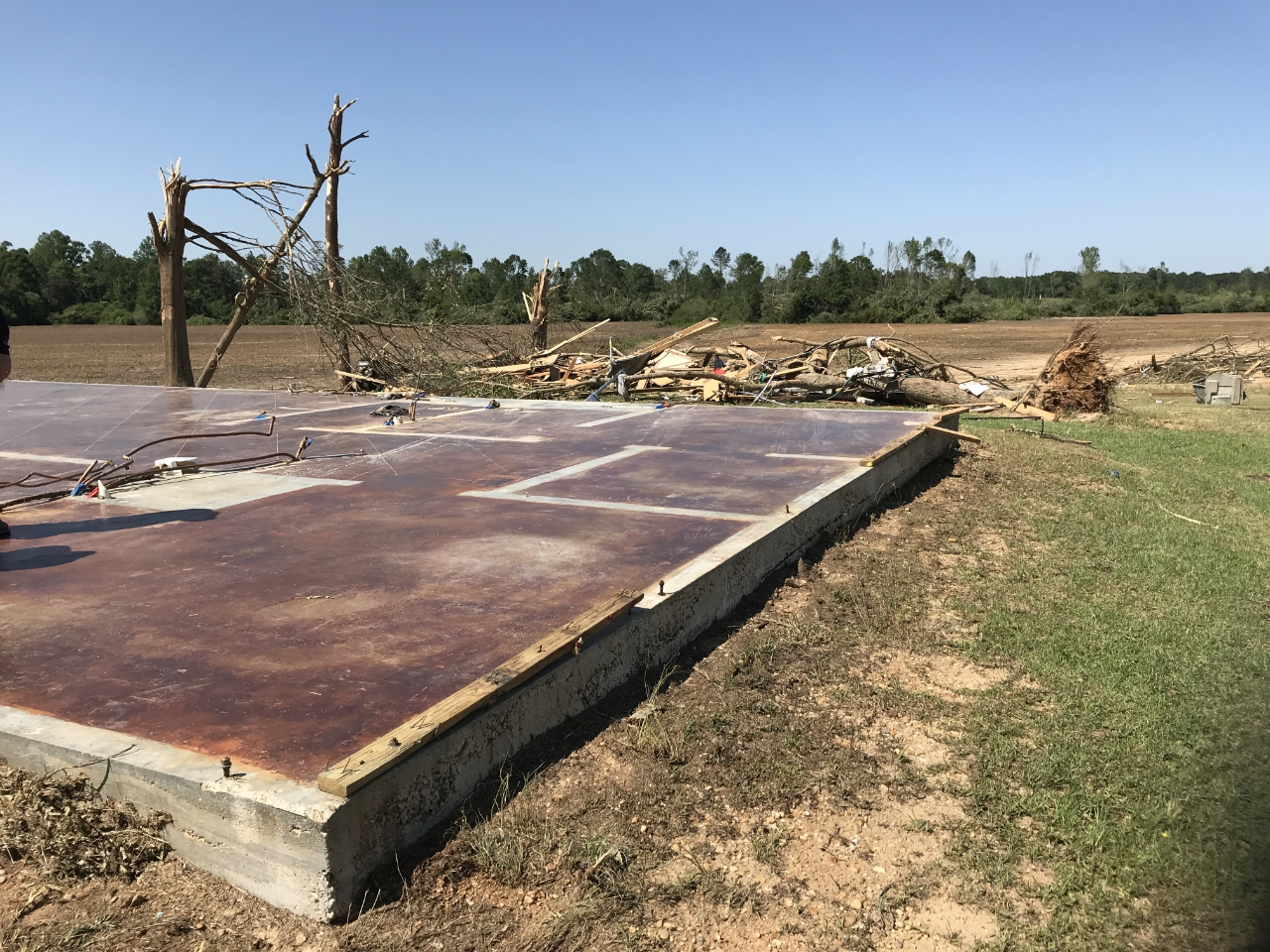
High-end EF4 damage to a well-constructed cabin northeast of Bassfield. Wind speeds up to 190 mph (310 km/h) were estimated here.

The tornado then moved through the small town of Soso, damaging or destroying multiple homes, some churches, and the local fire department building. Numerous trees were snapped throughout town, and several mobile homes were destroyed. Most of the damage in Soso was rated EF3, though a small area of low-end EF4 damage occurred along MS 28, where a well-built concrete block convenience store was completely leveled. The tornado weakened to EF2 intensity as it continued to the northeast of Soso, where more trees were downed, and numerous mobile homes were destroyed. Metal buildings were damaged, and outbuildings were destroyed as well. A house along Matthews Road had much of its roof torn off, and a nearby vehicle was rolled down a hill and badly mangled. After crossing MS 15 and entering Jasper County, the tornado intensified back to low-end EF4 intensity as it struck the community of Moss, where nearly every structure in town was damaged and numerous homes were destroyed. Several of these homes were flattened with only piles of rubble remaining, and one was left with only a single concrete closet standing. Half of the First Baptist Church was leveled, and a pickup truck was thrown hundreds of yards and completely destroyed. Continuing northeast of Moss, the tornado began to weaken, producing EF1 to EF2 damage. Several homes and mobile homes had metal roofing peeled back or decking exposed. Large swaths of trees were snapped for several miles, including some along I-59 between the Heidelberg and Vossburg exits. Barns and outbuildings were destroyed along this segment of the path, and some power poles were snapped. Northeast of Vossburg, the tornado weakened further, inflicting EF1 damage to trees and a mobile home. EF1 damage continued as the tornado crossed into Clarke County, where the tornadic circulation began to occlude as a new circulation produced an EF2 tornado to its east. This tornado then struck the town of Pachuta. Damage in Pachuta consisted of trees downed and minor roof damage. After causing some additional minor EF0 tree limb damage north-northeast of Pachuta, the tornado finally dissipated at County Road 320 at 5:28 p.m. CDT (22:28 UTC).

The tornado was estimated by the NWS to have been 3,960 yards (3,620 m) or 2.25 miles (3.62 km) wide, making it the widest tornado in Mississippi state history, and the fourth-widest in recorded history, surpassing the May 4, 2007, EF3 tornado associated with the Greensburg tornado family and just behind the 2004 Hallam tornado, the 2016 Jiangsu tornado, and the 2013 El Reno tornado. A total of eight fatalities and at least 95 injuries occurred along the path. The tornado was also long-tracked, with a path length of 67.43 mi (108.52 km). Damage was severe to the point the path of the tornado could be seen from satellite imagery. The tornado was given a high-end EF4 rating with estimated winds of 190 mph (310 km/h). Debris from the tornado was carried considerable distances, with a photo from a destroyed home in Moss being found 121 miles (195 km) away in Tuscaloosa, Alabama, while another one was lofted and carried 176 miles (283 km) from south of Collins, Mississippi to Randolph, Alabama. The path of the tornado also mirrored that of a long-tracked F3 tornado that killed two and injured 19 on April 21, 1951.

In 2023, tornado expert Thomas P. Grazulis published that this tornado was a "minimal EF4, based on tree damage...millions of trees were destroyed". Grazulis also published that the width of the tornado was 2,000 yards (1,800 m; 1.1 mi; 1.8 km), not close to the National Weather Service width of 2.25 miles (3.62 km).

=== Topeka–Oak Vale–Carson–Rose Hill, Mississippi ===
Topeka–Oak Vale–Carson-Rose Hill, Mississippi
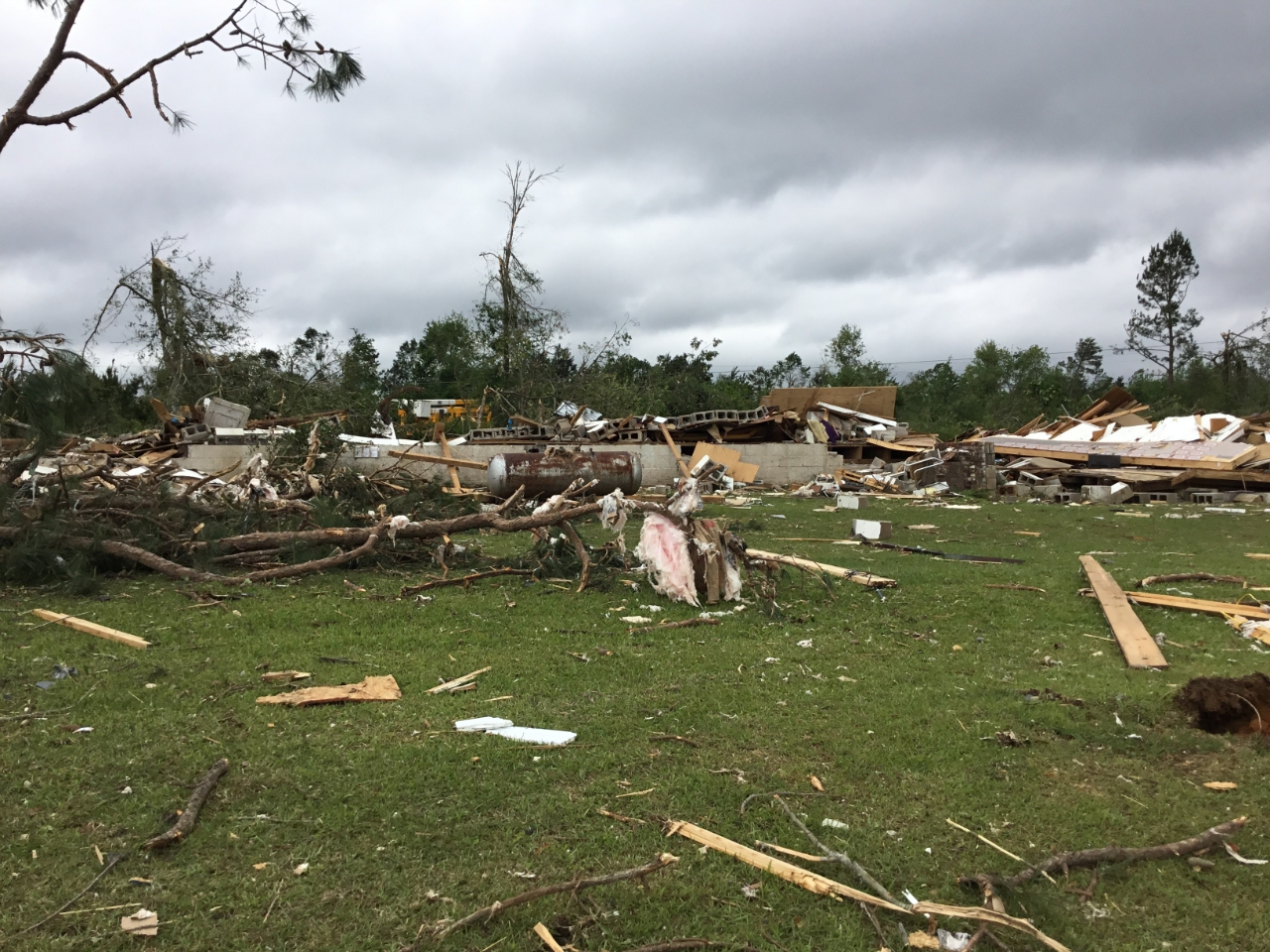
- Remains of the James Hill Church, which was leveled at EF3 strength to the northeast of Carson, Mississippi.

Meteorological history
- Formed: April 12, 2020 4:36 p.m. CDT (UTC−05:00)
- Dissipated: April 12, 2020 6:07 p.m. CDT (UTC−05:00)
- Duration: 1 hour 31 minutes

EF3 tornado
- on the Enhanced Fujita scale
- Highest winds: 150 mph (240 km/h)

Overall effects
- Injuries: 2
- Damage: $34.05 million

This strong, long-tracked wedge tornado was spawned by a supercell thunderstorm that tracked closely behind, and just north of the supercell that produced the previous two EF4 tornadoes. It first touched down along Price Road in Lawrence County, Mississippi, east-southeast of the small community of Topeka at 4:36 p.m. CDT (21:36 UTC). Damage at the beginning of the path consisted of a few trees uprooted at EF0 strength. The tornado continued to the northeast, quickly reaching EF2 intensity as it crossed Given Road, where a large swath of trees was flattened. EF2 damage continued to the northeast, with many large trees being snapped and uprooted. A house along Rayborn Lane sustained EF1 roof damage, and two nearby sheds were damaged as well. The tornado strengthened further and reached EF3 strength as it moved through a wooded area near the Pearl River, where a log cabin was destroyed, and numerous trees were snapped and partially debarked. After crossing the Pearl River, the tornado passed near Oak Vale where some homes sustained roof and exterior wall loss, numerous trees were snapped, a metal building was destroyed, and damage was rated EF2 to EF3. Crossing into Jefferson Davis County, EF2 damage occurred in areas to the northeast of Oak Vale, where numerous trees and power poles were snapped, outbuildings were destroyed, homes sustained severe roof damage, and a mobile home was destroyed. A small area of EF3 damage occurred along Kirkley Lane, where some trees were denuded and partially debarked. A home and an outbuilding farther away from the center of the damage path sustained EF1 damage as well. Additional EF2 damage occurred to the west and north of Carson, where a small business housed in a manufactured structure was completely destroyed, many trees were downed, and two well-built homes had their roofs torn off. EF2 damage continued to the northeast of Carson, where several mobile homes were destroyed, another house had its roof ripped off, and multiple other homes sustained less severe roof damage.

Crossing MS 35, the tornado again attained EF3 strength as the James Hill Church was completely leveled, a nearby home sustained collapse of its exterior walls, and trees were denuded and partially debarked. Multiple mobile homes were also destroyed in this area, and power poles were snapped. Additional EF3 tree damage occurred along Terrell Road before the tornado crossed into Covington County. EF3 tree damage continued along Three Notch Road, while a mobile home and two frame homes were destroyed nearby. The tornado weakened back to EF2 intensity as it approached and crossed US 84, snapping and uprooting numerous trees and destroying numerous chicken houses. As the tornado continued to the northeast, it produced EF1 to EF2 damage as it approached and crossed US 49 to the northwest of Collins, downing many trees, some of which landed on homes and mobile homes. A small silo was blown over, outbuildings were destroyed, a mobile home was blown away and destroyed, and some houses sustained roof damage. Crossing Jones Chapel Road to the northeast, the tornado weakened to EF1 strength, with damage limited to downed trees. EF1 tree and outbuilding damage continued through the northwestern corner of Jones County and the southeastern corner of Smith County, and a church sustained some damage along this segment of the path as well. EF1 damage continued into Jasper County, where a house and a chicken farm were damaged, and many trees were downed in and around the small community of Stringer. EF1 tree and outbuilding damage continued along the remainder of the path and through the rural community of Paulding until the tornado dissipated along County Road 31 to the south of Rose Hill at 6:07 p.m. CDT (23:07 UTC).

Remaining on the ground for 84.1 miles (135.3 km), this was the longest-tracked tornado of the outbreak. It reached a peak width of 2,041 yards (1,866 m) (or 1.16 miles (1.87 km)), and resulted in at least two injuries, but no fatalities. It was rated mid-range EF3.

=== Fashion–Sumac, Georgia ===
Fashion–Sumac, Georgia
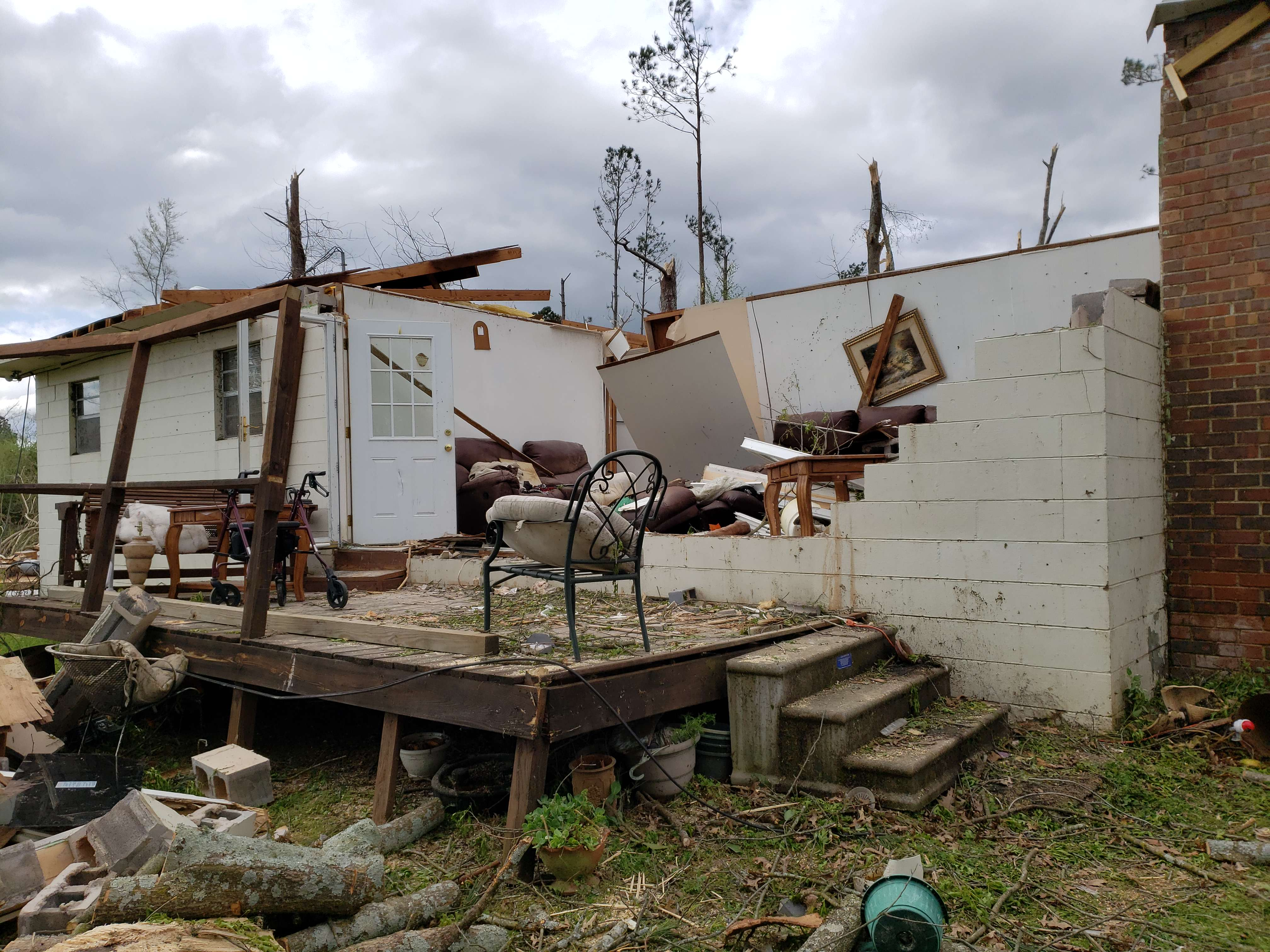
- EF2 damage to a house in Sumac, Georgia.

Meteorological history
- Formed: April 12, 2020 8:45 p.m. EDT (UTC−04:00)
- Dissipated: April 12, 2020 8:55 p.m. EDT (UTC−04:00)
- Duration: 10 minutes

EF2 tornado
- on the Enhanced Fujita scale
- Highest winds: 130–135 mph (209–217 km/h)

Overall effects
- Fatalities: 8
- Injuries: 24
- Damage: $500,000 (2020 USD)

This strong, high-end EF2 tornado first touched down along Mitchell Bridge Road, just northwest of Chatsworth near the Indian Trace Golf Course at 8:45 p.m. EDT (01:45 UTC). It headed north-northeast, snapping or uprooting some trees and causing minor roof and siding damage to several homes at EF0 strength. The tornado began to grow in size and reached EF1 intensity after crossing SR 286 and moving into a neighborhood just southwest of Fashion. Exterior damage to homes became more severe, and numerous trees were snapped and uprooted. One home in this area had a large portion of its roof torn off. The tornado then downed a large swath of trees before crossing Norton Bridge Road and reaching EF2 strength. It then moved through the west side of Fashion, obliterating at least eight double-wide manufactured homes along Deer Park Drive while damaging several others. Continuing north-northeast, additional manufactured homes were destroyed as the tornado paralleled SR 225 and crossed Ridgeview Lane and Fieldview Court. The tornado then reached its peak intensity as a recently built cell tower was blown over and crumpled at high-end EF2 intensity. The tornado maintained EF2 intensity as it moved into the southern part of the rural community of Sumac and crossed Zion Hill Church Road. A mobile home was destroyed in this area, a small frame home had its roof torn off and sustained partial exterior wall collapse, and numerous trees were snapped. A few other nearby homes sustained roof damage as well. The tornado then weakened slightly but maintained EF2 intensity as it crossed SR 255 and through the central part of Sumac, where a house was destroyed, and a few others sustained minor damage. It also heavily damaged a large metal chicken house in this area. The tornado then began to weaken and narrow as it continued north, where it destroyed or damaged multiple chicken houses along Jim Petty Road. Debris from these structures was scattered hundreds of yards away, and damage in this area was rated high-end EF1 to EF2. The tornado weakened further as it continued to the north-northeast at EF0 strength, downing a few trees and causing minor damage to an outbuilding. EF0 damage continued as the tornado downed a few tree limbs along Halls Chapel Road before it dissipated just before reaching Sumac Ridge to the southwest of Cisco at 8:55 p.m. EDT (01:55 UTC).

The tornado was on the ground for 10 minutes, traveled 8.88 miles (14.29 km), had a maximum width of 860 yards (790 m), and was given a rating of high-end EF2. Eight people were killed by the tornado, all of which occurred in mobile or trailer homes including one person who died of his injuries the following month. A total of 24 other people were injured. A tornado warning was not issued for the storm until the tornado had already been on the ground for eight minutes.

=== Fort Oglethorpe, Georgia/Chattanooga–Ooltewah, Tennessee ===
Fort Oglethorpe, Georgia/Chattanooga–Ooltewah, Tennessee
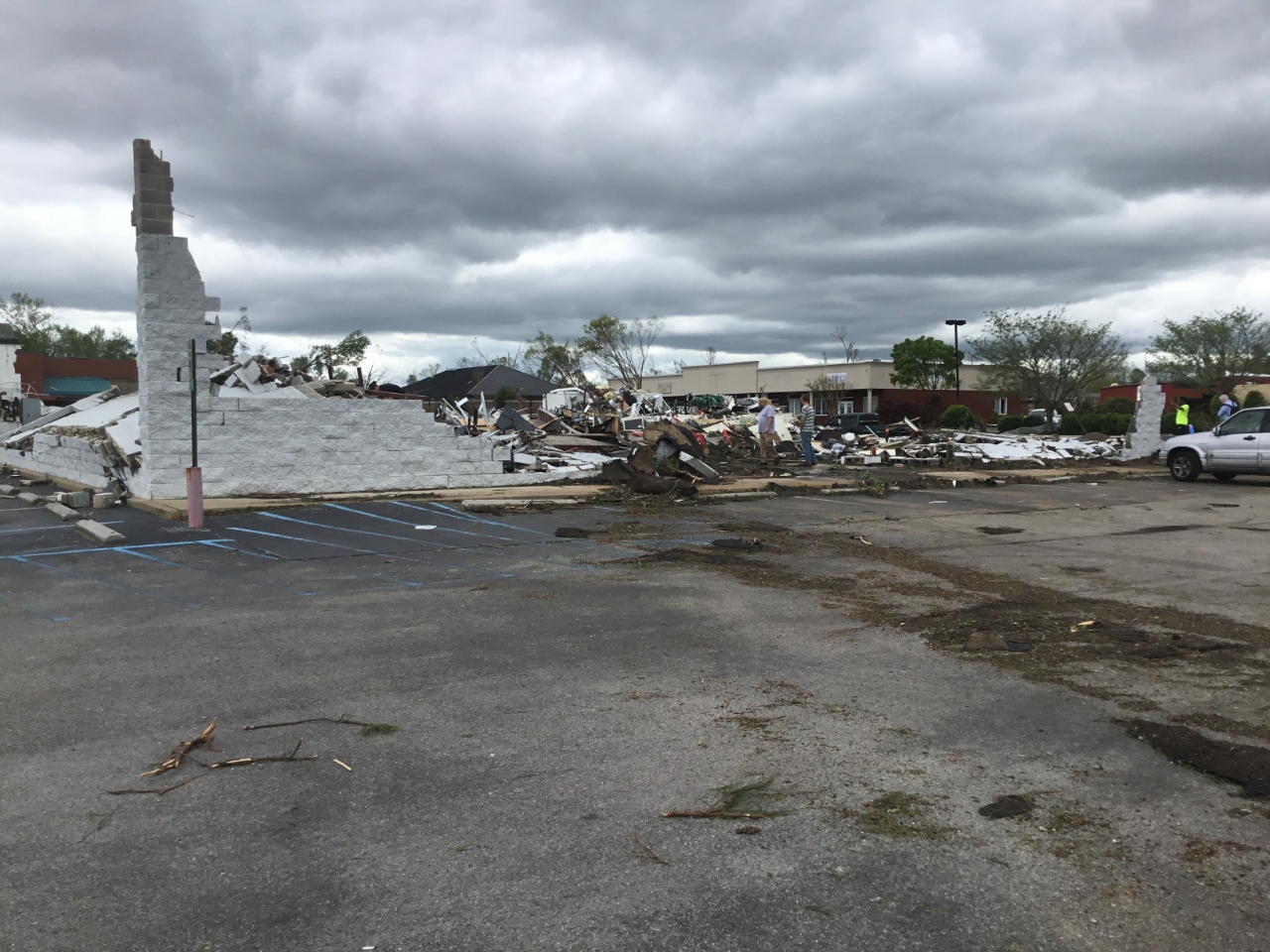
- EF3 damage to an auto-parts store in the East Brainerd area of Chattanooga, Tennessee.

Meteorological history
- Formed: April 12, 2020 11:15 p.m. EDT (UTC−04:00)
- Dissipated: April 12, 2020 11:33 p.m. EDT (UTC−04:00)
- Duration: 18 minutes

EF3 tornado
- on the Enhanced Fujita scale
- Highest winds: 145 mph (233 km/h)

Overall effects
- Fatalities: 2
- Injuries: 18
- Damage: ≥$225 million (2020 USD)

This large intense tornado embedded within a strong QLCS first touched down near the Chickamauga Battlefield in Fort Oglethorpe, Georgia around 11:15 p.m. EDT on April 12 (03:15 UTC, April 13). Initially causing EF0 damage, it moved northeast and quickly strengthened, impacting an industrial area on the south side of town at high-end EF1 strength. Multiple businesses and metal buildings along SR 2 were damaged and a weather station at the Public Works Department measured a wind gust of 106 mph (171 km/h) in this area. As the tornado tracked through Fort Oglethorpe, EF1 damage continued as a car wash was destroyed, a McDonald's was damaged, light poles were downed, and the front wall of a Sherwin-Williams paint store was blown in. Several other businesses were also damaged. Trees and tree limbs in Fort Oglethorpe were downed, and some homes and apartment buildings sustained roof damage. Thereafter, the tornado exited Fort Oglethorpe and continued to the northeast, weakening to EF0 intensity as it produced minor tree and roof damage intermittently. It then crossed I-75 before moving into Tennessee, entering the eastern neighborhoods and suburbs of Chattanooga. The tornado then strengthened to EF1 intensity again as it impacted the Harris Hills neighborhood, snapping and uprooting numerous trees in residential areas. It then entered the East Brainerd area and crossed SR 320, rapidly becoming strong and producing EF3 damage. An auto-parts store in this area was almost entirely leveled, with only part of one exterior wall left standing. A strip mall was severely damaged, and a barbecue restaurant on the east side of the building was completely destroyed. A nearby doctor's office building was heavily damaged as well, and East Brainerd Elementary School had its roof torn off. Dozens of homes in residential areas along this segment of the path also sustained major structural damage, some of which were large and well-built. As the tornado continued northeast, a tornado emergency was issued for Collegedale and Ooltewah. The tornado then reached its peak width as it entered the Drake Forest neighborhood of Chattanooga while still at EF3 intensity. Numerous well-built homes in this area had their roofs torn off and sustained collapse of their exterior walls, and numerous trees were snapped or denuded. EF2 to EF3 damage continued through the Holly Hills neighborhood where additional trees were snapped, power poles were downed, and many homes and apartment buildings sustained roof and exterior wall loss. Multiple buildings were severely damaged at the Grace Baptist Church and Academy as well. The tornado then abruptly narrowed and weakened back to EF1 strength as it passed just northwest of Collegedale and moved directly into Ooltewah. Many trees were downed along this portion of the path, and multiple apartment buildings sustained roof damage as the tornado hit the Integra Hills Preserve Apartments. The tornado then weakened further and caused EF0 strength tree damage as it crossed into Bradley County and over White Oak Mountain before dissipating south of McDonald around 11:33 p.m. EDT (03:33 UTC).

The tornado was on the ground for 18 minutes, traveled 18.37 miles (29.56 km), was 1,500 yards (1,400 m) wide, and was rated EF3. Throughout the Chattanooga metropolitan area, 2,718 properties sustained damage, of which 254 were destroyed and 259 had major damage. Total damages were reported as reaching $225 million and two people were killed, while an additional 18 were injured.

=== Retreat–Seneca–Clemson, South Carolina ===
Retreat–Seneca–Clemson, South Carolina
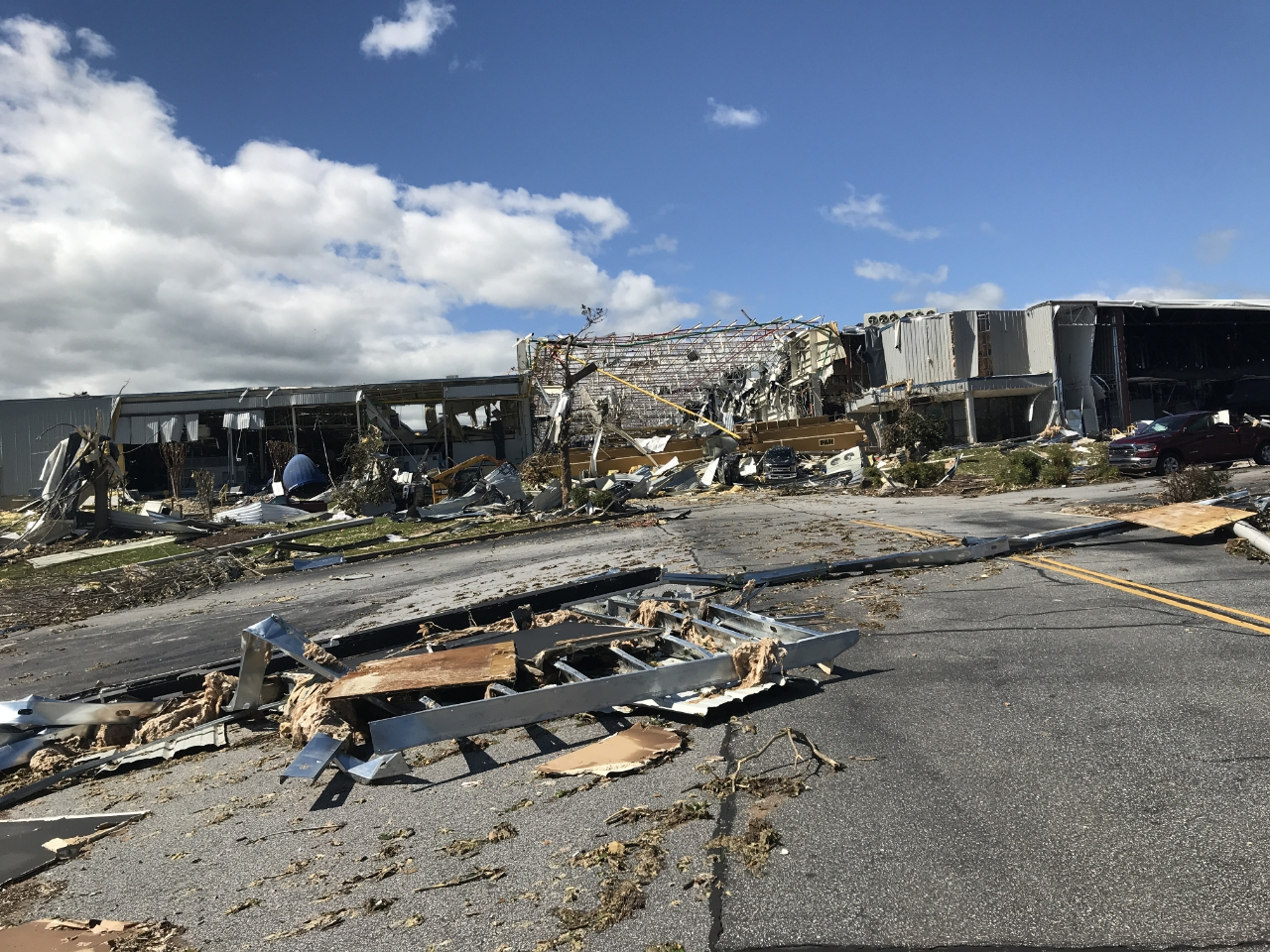
- EF3 damage to the BorgWarner plant in Seneca, South Carolina.

Meteorological history
- Formed: April 13, 2020 3:21 a.m. EDT (UTC−04:00)
- Dissipated: April 13, 2020 3:36 a.m. EDT (UTC−04:00)
- Duration: 15 minutes

EF3 tornado
- on the Enhanced Fujita scale
- Highest winds: 160 mph (260 km/h)

Overall effects
- Fatalities: 1
- Injuries: 5
- Damage: $100 million (2020 USD)

This high–end EF3 tornado initially touched down near Stonewall Drive to the south-southeast of Westminster around 3:21 a.m. EDT (07:21 UTC) on April 13. It inflicted EF0 damage to homes and trees as it moved to the northeast along the north side of South Retreat Road before striking Retreat. Trees and homes in this area suffered EF0 to EF1 damage as the tornado crossed over SC 11 and SC 24. EF1 damage continued as the tornado approached and crossed Brown Farm Road and Radisson Road. Damage rapidly became more severe and widespread as the tornado continued to the northeast and moved into more populated areas in the southwestern part of Seneca. Reaching EF3 strength, the tornado first struck a BorgWarner plant at the end of Evalona Drive, inflicting major structural damage to the facility and scattering large amounts of debris throughout the area. A security guard on the property was killed when the concrete-block guard shack he was in was obliterated. A block-foundation house in this area was also swept away at high-end EF3 strength, and a vehicle parked at this residence was blown into the basement. Other vehicles were flipped or damaged at the plant, and the large letter "B" from the BorgWarner sign was found in the yard of a residence in Liberty, 18 mi (29 km) away. The large tornado then approached and crossed the Wells Highway, where a small office building was destroyed (it was not rebuilt), and the Destiny Christian Center and International Church was shifted off its foundation and partially collapsed. The tornado then moved through residential areas of Seneca, where many homes sustained EF2 to EF3 damage, with roofs ripped off and exterior walls collapsed. Multiple detached garages were destroyed, a gas station awning was shredded, and numerous trees and power lines were downed throughout this part of the path. The tornado had grown to a half–mile wide at this point, and various degrees of damage was inflicted to numerous other homes in Seneca. Damage severity then began to quickly lessen, and the damage path narrowed as the tornado passed through the north edge of Utica and through the Jordania community. Mainly EF1 damage was noted as dozens of homes were damaged along this segment of the path, and many large trees were snapped or uprooted, some of which landed on structures. The tornado maintained EF1 strength as it crossed US 123 and continued to the northeast, where EF1 damage was inflicted to numerous trees just north of Keowee. The tornado than crossed Lake Hartwell northwest of Clemson and produced some EF0 tree damage before lifting due-west of Central after crossing SC 133 at 3:36 a.m. EDT (07:36 UTC).

The tornado was on the ground for 15 minutes, traveled 16.71 miles (26.89 km), and reached a maximum width of 1,000 yards (910 m). There was one fatality and five injuries. Damages in Seneca alone were reported as being in excess of $100 million. This was the strongest tornado to strike Upstate South Carolina in over 25 years.

=== Estill–Scotia–Nixville–Fechtig, South Carolina ===
Estill–Scotia–Nixville–Fechtig, South Carolina
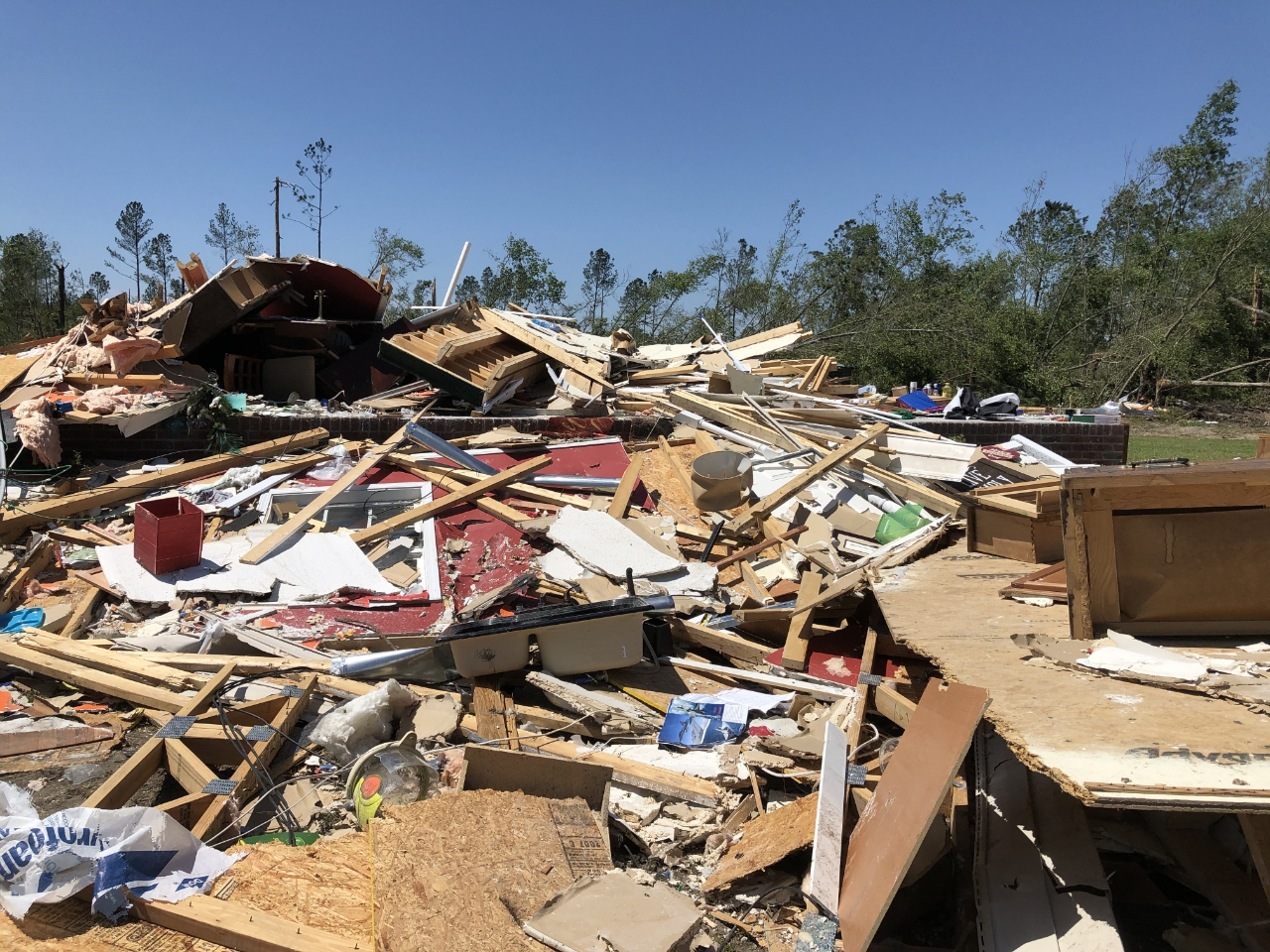
- EF4 damage to a two-story house to the northeast of Nixville, South Carolina.

Meteorological history
- Formed: April 13, 2020 6:10 a.m. EDT (UTC−04:00)
- Dissipated: April 13, 2020 6:37 a.m. EDT (UTC−04:00)
- Duration: 27 minutes

EF4 tornado
- on the Enhanced Fujita scale
- Highest winds: 175 mph (282 km/h)

Overall effects
- Fatalities: 5
- Injuries: 60

This large, violent multiple-vortex tornado first touched down in Hampton County, South Carolina at 6:10 a.m. EDT (10:10 UTC) west-northwest of Scotia, producing EF1-strength tree damage along Collie Road. It quickly became strong as it moved northeast, crossed Old Orangeburg Road, and impacted Federal Correctional Institution, Estill, which was significantly damaged. The damage to the medium-security prison was so severe that occupying inmates were relocated to Pennsylvania. The tornado then destroyed multiple structures at Canfor Southern Pine before strengthening further shortly after crossing over Steep Bottom Road and US 321 south of Estill, as EF2 to EF3 damage was inflicted to homes and mobile homes along Sprayfield Road. The tornado then crossed over the Lena Expressway and destroyed another residence at EF3 intensity, which had most of its exterior walls knocked down. The tornado then reached its maximum width of ~3/4 mile (1.2 km), mowing down a large swath of trees and destroying a cell tower. Some trees in this area were denuded and partially debarked, and vehicles were thrown/rolled 50–75 yards (46–69 m) and mangled. The tornado then turned deadly as it crossed over SC 3 and US 601 to the northwest of the small community of Nixville, killing two people in an obliterated mobile home. It then impacted another group of homes to the north of the town on the Turner Expressway, heavily damaging or destroying them and killing three in the area. The tornado then moved directly through Speaks Mill, crossing over 2 Sisters Ferry Road before reaching its peak intensity along Lento Road. Here, a well-built two-story home was leveled with only a pile of debris remaining, and some of its debris scattered into the yard. Damage to the residence was rated EF4. Another home across the street sustained EF3 damage as well, sustaining roof and exterior wall loss. The tornado then began a weakening trend as it continued to move northeastward toward US 278. Damage was mainly limited to trees and outbuildings in this area, and the scope of the damage began to narrow and become less severe as the tornado crossed US 278 and the Coosawhatchie River before paralleling Camp Branch. It then moved away from the tributary and tracked through rural areas to the south of Varnville, producing only minor damage to trees and residences as it crossed Miles Road and SC 68. The tornado continued to inflict minor tree damage to the northeast of here before dissipating at 6:37 a.m. EDT (10:37 UTC), to the north-northeast of Fechtig near the Hampton-Colleton County line at 6:37 a.m. EDT (10:37 UTC).

The tornado was on the ground for 27 minutes, reached a maximum width of 0.74 miles (1.19 km), traveled 23.73 miles (38.19 km), and was rated EF4. The tornado killed five people in the hardest hit areas just south of Estill and in Nixville. A total of 60 others were injured, including several individuals that were thrown 30–50 yards (27–46 m) from mobile homes as well as in homes that received EF3-EF4 damage. This was the first F4 or EF4 in the state since 1995 and the first in the South Carolina Lowcountry on record. The National Weather Service Forecast Office in Charleston referred to it as an "unusually long track and wide tornado." The tornado was associated with a tornado family that began in Screven County, Georgia and traveled northeast for over 150 miles (240 km) before shifting offshore in Georgetown County, South Carolina.

== Non-tornadic impacts ==
=== Flooding ===
Heavy rainfall across eastern Texas led to flash flooding and multiple road closures throughout many communities. Downed trees and powerlines caused additional road closures. Gusty winds in Upshur County, Texas killed one man after a tree fell on him in his driveway. As the storms progressed into Arkansas, widespread damaging winds were observed, causing the collapse of old buildings and the historic Centennial Baptist Church in downtown Helena-West Helena. The 9-1-1 and emergency dispatch were disrupted throughout the city, and scattered debris obstructed ambulances from reaching hospitals. The strong winds toppled numerous trees, powerlines, and fences throughout the southern portions of the state. Additional damage was inflicted to structures such as greenhouses, poultry farms, sheds, barns, and docks. The downed trees blocked numerous highways. In White Hall, one downed tree fell onto a home and killed an occupant. More than 143,000 customers were left without power in Arkansas in the storms' wake. In Mississippi, heavy rainfall overspread Panola County, where Mississippi Emergency Management Personnel donated sandbags to prevent flooding. Widespread rainfall amount of 3–4 in (76–102 mm), locally exceeded 6 in (150 mm), across northern Alabama prompted significant flooding across DeKalb County. There, about 50 roadways were temporarily closed. Floodwaters inundated some businesses in Collinsville. In nearby Fort Payne, waters inundated several businesses, forcing about 35 people from the flooded areas. Multiple roads were reportedly washed out. Significant flooding was likewise reported across Madison, Morgan, and Jackson counties.

Farther north in Tennessee, a 33-year-old woman was swept away and drowned by rushing water at a bridge in Kimball. Four bridges in total were damaged by the flooding, including three in South Pittsburg. Nashville recorded a daily rainfall record of 2.23 in (57 mm). Heavy rainfall fell throughout the Tennessee Valley in the wake of the wettest first three months of any year on record, causing the Chickamauga Dam and Watts Bar Lake to climb about 1.5 ft (0.46 m) above normal summertime pool levels. Numerous roads were blocked in Rutherford, Williamson, and Washington counties. The McFarland Park in Florence was submerged as the Tennessee River spilled its banks. Across Unicoi County, multiple roads were washed out. The rising waters prompted an evacuation order for the Temple Hill community. High waters flowed through homes around Hampton and Valley Forge in Carter County. The Beaver Creek in Bristol overflowed its banks, flooding intersections. The Kingsport Fire Department rescued 21 people as the city was threatened by rising waters. A total of 27 roads were closed throughout Sullivan County. In northeastern Tennessee, flooding damaged two bridges in the Johnson City area. Some residents in the community of Sinking Creek were cut off as several low-level areas were inundated. In Carter County, the Gap Creek overflowed its banks and closed roadways.

=== Wind damage ===
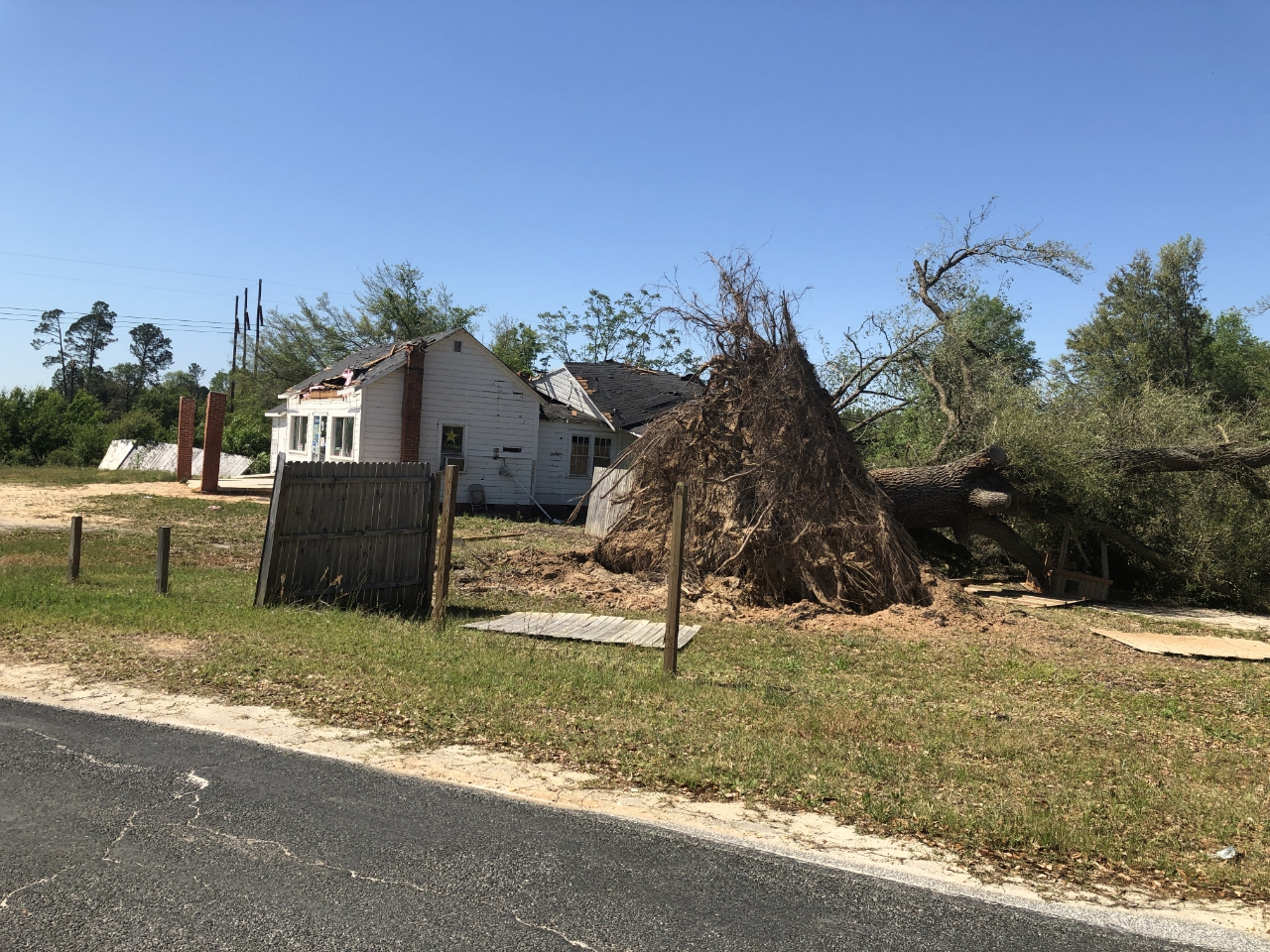
A microburst near Wallace, South Carolina, caused extensive damage to homes and vegetation.

Widespread damaging winds rolled across North Carolina, leaving behind extensive damage. Approximately 200,000 people lost power state-wide. A person was killed by a fallen tree in Davidson County. A microburst near Wallace in Marlboro County, South Carolina, produced winds of 100–110 mph (160–180 km/h) over an area 2–3 mi (3.2–4.8 km) wide and 4–5 mi (6.4–8.0 km) long. Several homes had their roof blown off and an unanchored mobile home was flipped off its foundation. Hundreds of hardwood and softwood trees were snapped throughout the area. Statewide, approximately 300,000 people lost power.

Powerful winds associated with the parent storm system impacted much of the Northeastern United States on April 13. In preparation of the severe storms, Presque Isle State Park in Pennsylvania closed on April 13. Hurricane-force wind gusts were observed in Delaware and New Jersey, reaching 82 mph (132 km/h) in Island Beach State Park, New Jersey, and 79 mph (127 km/h) in Sussex County, Delaware. More than 56,000 customers were left without power in New Jersey. In Cresskill, a tree fell onto a home. In Beacon, New York, many street lights lost power due to the wind, resulting in many roads, including New York State Route 9D being blocked off. 130,000 customers lost power in Massachusetts, where wind gusts maxed out at 80 mph (130 km/h) in Milton. Meanwhile, in Connecticut, parts of Route 17, Route 434, Route 107 and Route 100 were closed due to the storm.

=== Winter storm ===
Outside the warm sector of the broad system, an unseasonable snowstorm and gale-force winds affected regions from the northern Plains into the Midwestern United States. Sioux Falls, South Dakota, recorded 5.2 in (13 cm) on April 12, a daily record and the second snowiest Easter Sunday on record. The Twin Cities recorded 5.1 in (13 cm) of snow, setting a new Easter Sunday record going back to 1891. Accumulations totaling to nearly a foot across portions of southern Minnesota caused multiple spinouts and crashes, principally along I-35 south of the Twin Cities, I-90 between Albert Lea and Rochester, and US 52 between Rochester and the Twin Cities. Traffic, though, was lighter than usual given the stay-at-home order for the ongoing COVID-19 pandemic. State patrol reported 140 crashes, 126 vehicle that spun out, and six semi-trucks that jackknifed on slippery roads. Fourteen people were injured. In Wisconsin, a band of 6–15 in (15–38 cm) accumulations fell north of a Marshfield to Wausaukee line. Daily snowfall records were set in Rochester and Eau Claire. Winds exceeding gale threshold backed up waters on the Fox and East rivers, causing minor flooding in Green Bay. In Michigan, areas of the Upper Peninsula between Marquette and Munising recorded 18–24 in (46–61 cm) of snow. Wave heights of 7.5–8.5 ft (2.3–2.6 m) were estimated on Lake Michigan.

== Aftermath and records ==
Fatalities by state
State	Fatalities	Ref.
Arkansas	1	
Georgia	8	
Mississippi	14	
North Carolina	1	
South Carolina	9	
Tennessee	4	
Texas	1	
Total	38	

More than 1.44 million customers from Texas into Pennsylvania lost power at one time during the storm, and more than 4.3 million customers in total were impacted. In the wake of the outbreak, recovery efforts were hampered by the ongoing pandemic and the American Red Cross resorted to readying hotel rooms, not mass shelters, for affected residents. States of emergency were declared in Louisiana, Mississippi, Alabama, Georgia, and South Carolina. Southern Baptist disaster relief agencies established relief operations centered in Soso, Mississippi, and Chattanooga, Tennessee. Assisting members were provided personal protective equipment to reduce the risk of exposure to COVID-19.

In heavy-hit Monroe, Louisiana, the National Guard was deployed to assist in debris removal. Drax Biomass, headquartered in the city, donated $10,000 to tornado relief. At emergency shelters, masks and gloves were provided to residents. The city sought to acquire 200 hotel rooms to house victims as a countermeasure to mass gatherings.

Of Mississippi's 82 counties, 33 reported damage from the tornado and severe weather event. At least 1,200 homes and 75 businesses were damaged or destroyed and losses exceeded $10 million. On April 16, President Donald Trump approved federal disaster declarations for Covington, Jefferson Davis, and Jones counties in Mississippi. With a declaration already in effect for COVID-19, this is believed to be the first instance of concurrent federal disaster declarations in state history. Collectively, 333 homes were damaged or destroyed in the counties. Jones County established a base of operations in Bassfield to coordinate relief efforts. Tarps and water were supplied to affected persons. The Salvation Army assisted in providing food to displaced residents and the Sartinville United Methodist Church coordinated relief with nonprofit agencies. Power was restored to all homes capable of receiving power in Jones, Walthall, and Yazoo counties by April 18. Local news agencies under the Mississippi Gray Television network—WLBT, WDAM, WLOX, WMC, and WTOK—established a fundraiser with the Red Cross. Gray Television itself donated $10,000.

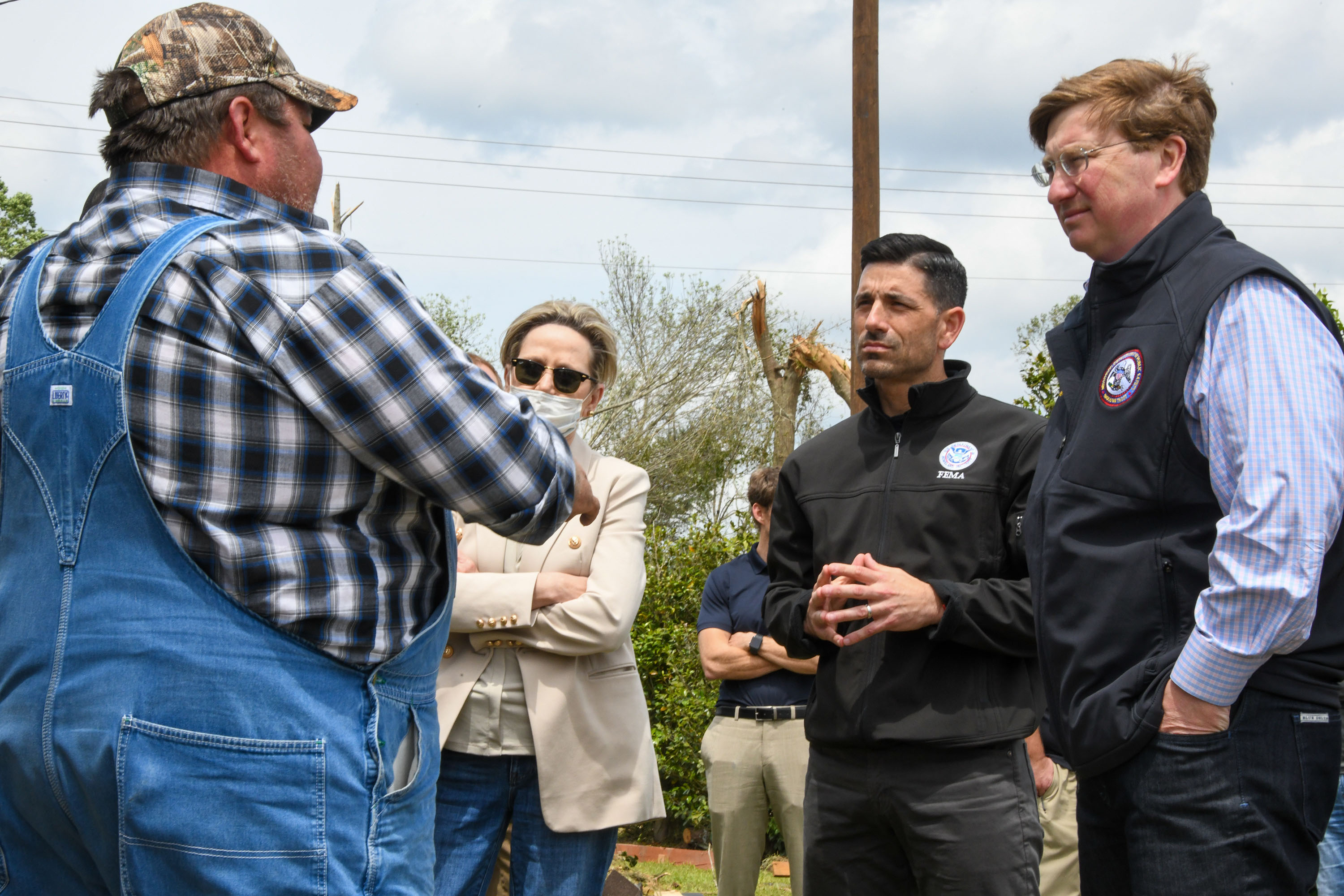
Acting Homeland Security Secretary Chad Wolf and Mississippi Governor Tate Reeves speaking with tornado survivors in southern Mississippi

On April 14, Chattanooga, Tennessee, was toured by the state's governor, Bill Lee; it marked the second time the governor had surveyed tornado damage in a little over a month following the deadly tornado outbreak of March 2–3, 2020. More than 500 emergency responders were deployed city-wide for search and rescue. Sixty-five residents of an Alzheimer's living facility were relocated to a hotel due to structural damage. Through April 20, Chattanooga public works removed 3,890 tons of debris from the city. Tennessee Emergency Management Agency officials applied for a federal disaster assistance.

After what was the deadliest day for tornadoes in South Carolina since the March 1984 outbreak, the Red Cross sheltered 236 displaced residents in hotels. Widespread damage in Seneca, prompted a curfew for the city. A medium-security prison in Hampton County, South Carolina, was directly impacted by an EF4 tornado, with resultant damage so severe that occupying inmates were relocated to Pennsylvania. The state's governor, Henry McMaster, toured the damage on April 14. By April 16, 600 people utilized housing and meals from the Red Cross. Throughout Orangeburg County, 54 single-family homes, 27 mobile homes, and 10 businesses suffered damage from tornadoes; total losses reached $2.98 million. Pickens County reported $1 million in damage.

For the 24-hour period ending 12:00 UTC April 13, the National Weather Service issued 141 tornado warnings, the most in one day since the tornado outbreak of March 2–3, 2012. 12 tornadoes were confirmed to have touched down in North Carolina, making it the sixth largest one-day outbreak on record in the state going back to 1950. With 12 significant (EF2+) tornadoes recorded statewide—eight of which were rated at EF3 or stronger—the outbreak set records for the greatest number of EF2+ tornadoes registered in a single day in South Carolina. With nine fatalities, the outbreak was also the second deadliest on record in the state since 1950, behind only the outbreak of March 28, 1984.

== See also ==
- List of North American tornadoes and tornado outbreaks
  - List of F4 and EF4 tornadoes (2020–present)
- List of case studies on tornadoes (2020–present)
- Tornado outbreak sequence of March 1913 – Another very deadly outbreak during Easter weekend in 1913
- 1994 Palm Sunday tornado outbreak – A similar deadly tornado outbreak in the same regions
- Tornado outbreak of April 23, 2000 – Another tornado outbreak that occurred on Easter Sunday in 2000
