= List of United States tornadoes in April 2020 =

United States tornadoes in April 2020
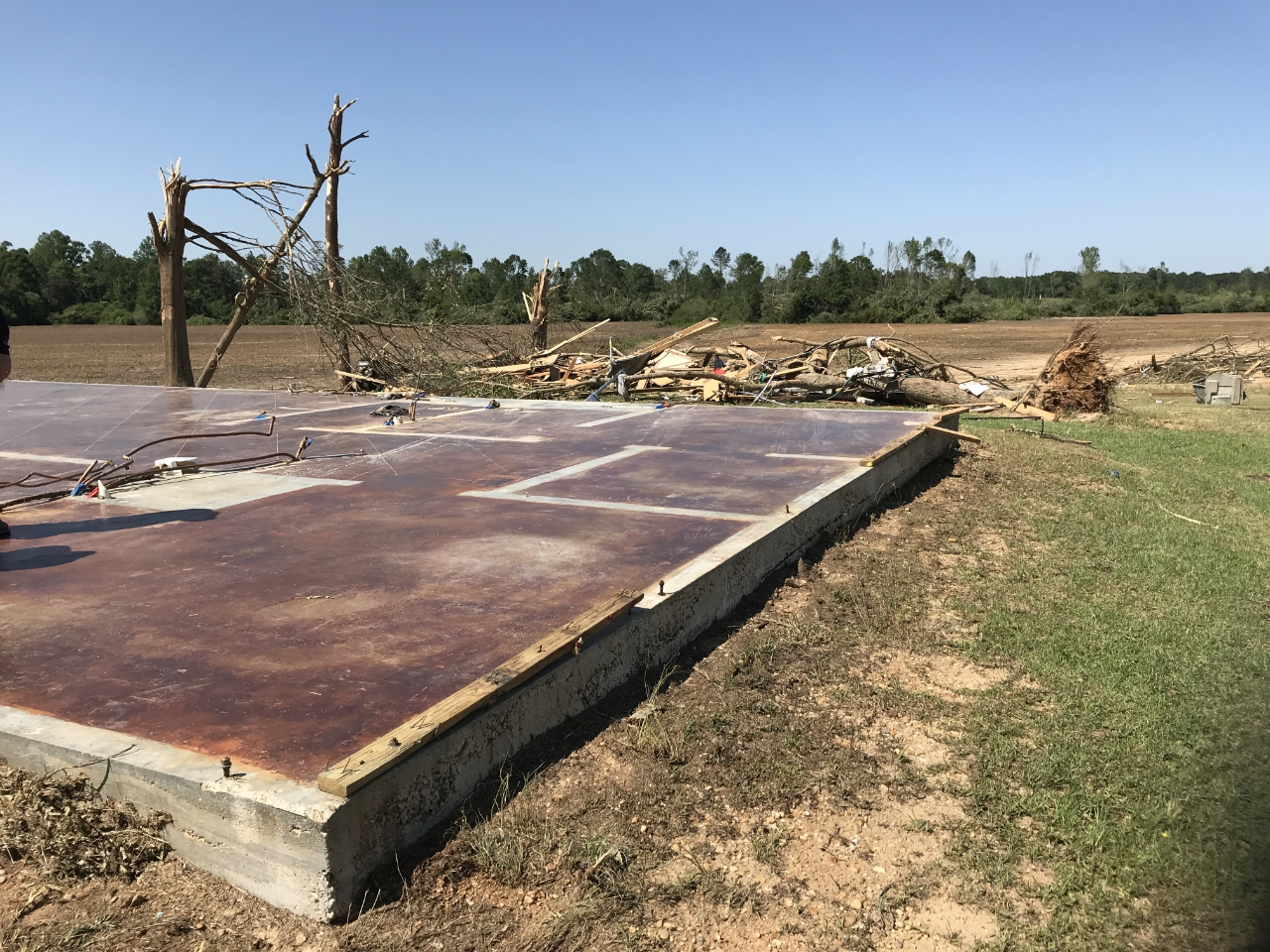
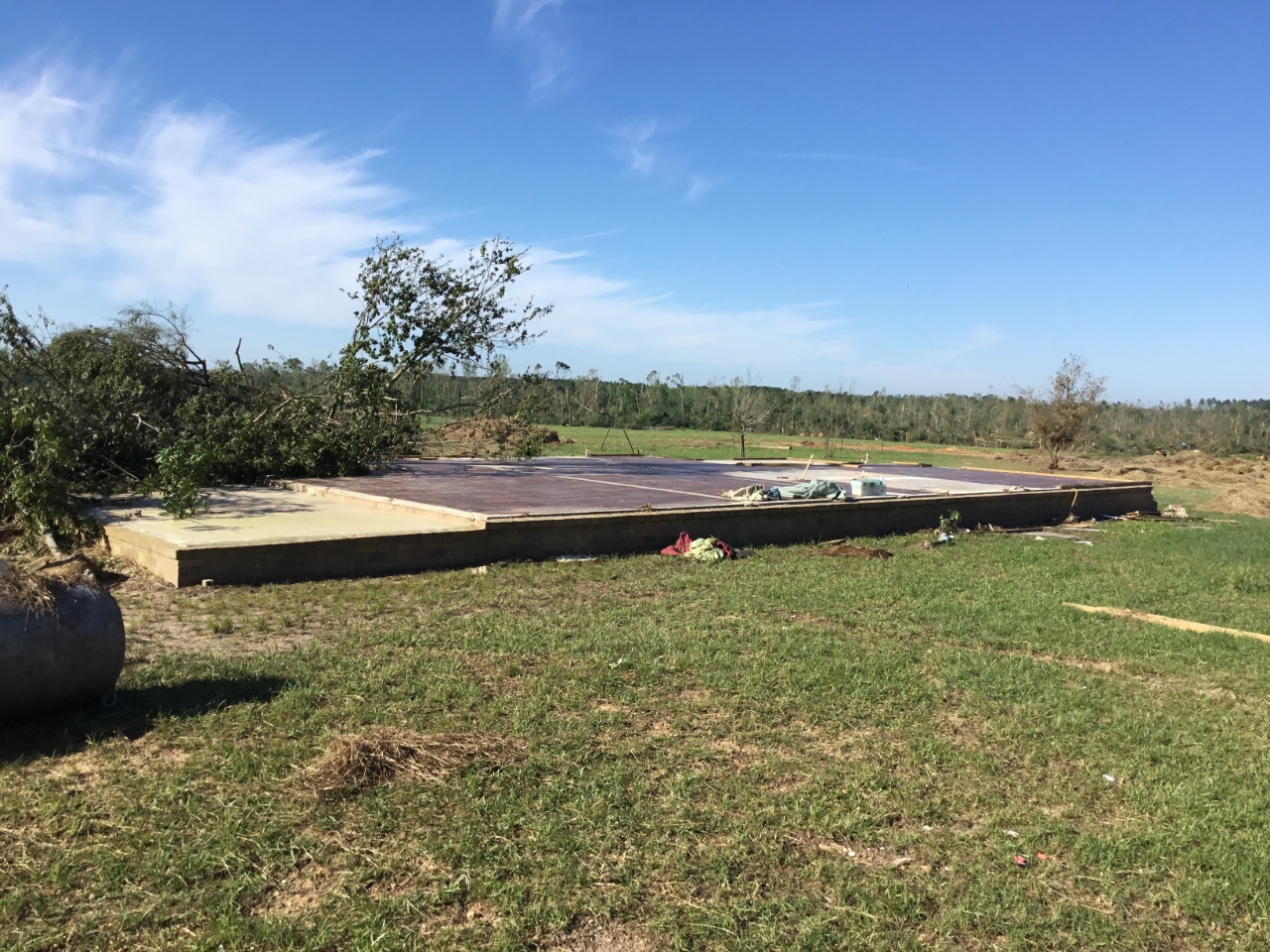
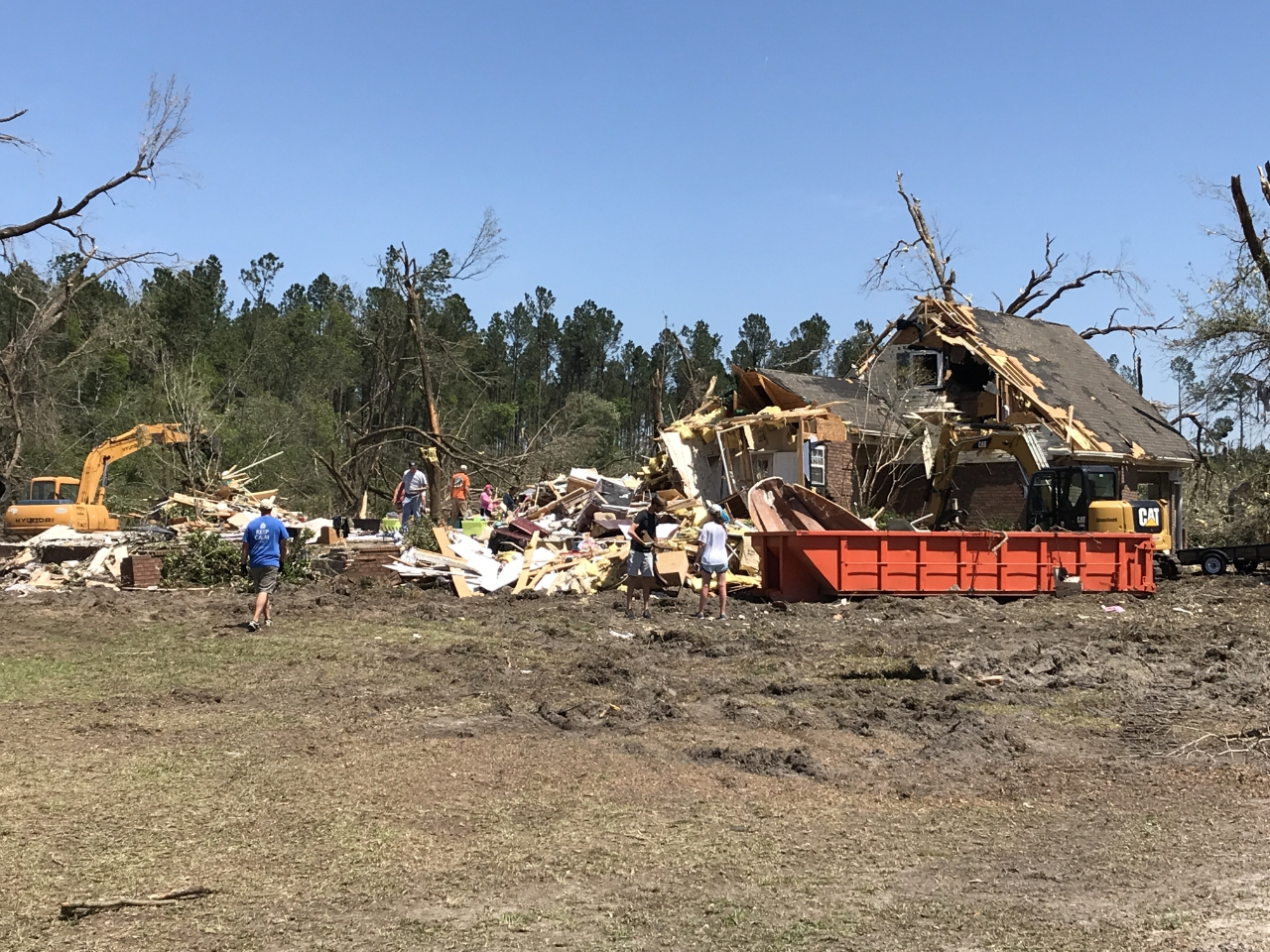
- Clockwise from top: A home swept in Cantwell Mills, Mississippi after a deadly EF4 tornado on April 12; Severe damage to a home following an EF4 tornado on April 13; A home near Sartinville, Mississippi swept by a destructive EF4 tornado on April 12.
- Timespan: April 7–29
- Maximum rated tornado: EF4 tornado: Sartinville, Mississippi on April 12; Bassfield–Moss, Mississippi on April 12; Estill, South Carolina on April 13; Sandy Hook, Mississippi on April 19
- Tornadoes: 267
- Fatalities: 40
- Injuries: >330

In April 2020, various weather forecast offices of the National Weather Service confirmed 267 tornadoes in the United States, indicating significantly above-average activity for the month. Based on the 1991–2010 averaging period, 155 tornadoes occur across the country during April. While the first three months of a year commonly feature tornadic activity across the Southeastern United States in close proximity to the Gulf of Mexico, this risk area expands to include the U.S. Midwest and U.S. Southern Great Plains in April, maximized in the states of Texas and Oklahoma. This expansion comes as powerful winter-like systems overlap with an increasingly warm and humid airmass from the Gulf of Mexico.

In 2020, several distinct severe weather events contributed to above-average activity. The first outbreak came from April 7–9, when 31 generally weak tornadoes were recorded across the Midwestern United States and Northeast, especially in Ohio. On Easter weekend, a widespread tornado outbreak featuring several significant to violent tornadoes occurred across much of the Southeast, with 141 tornado confirmations. Tornadoes inflicted 12 deaths in Mississippi, 3 deaths in Tennessee, 8 deaths in Georgia, and 9 deaths in South Carolina. The outbreak prompted 141 tornado warnings in a 24-hour period, the most in one day since the tornado outbreak of March 2–3, 2012. It registered as the sixth-largest tornado event on record in North Carolina, ranked as the second deadliest outbreak on record in South Carolina, and had the highest number of strong (EF2+) tornadoes in a single day on record in South Carolina. From April 21–23, another outbreak of 52 tornadoes across the Southeast caused six deaths. In all, there were 267 confirmed tornadoes in the US in April 2020, and these combined to cause 40 deaths in the month.

== United States yearly total ==
Confirmed tornadoes by Enhanced Fujita rating
EFU	EF0	EF1	EF2	EF3	EF4	EF5	Total
109	443	421	89	18	6	0	1,086

== April ==
Confirmed tornadoes by Enhanced Fujita rating
EFU	EF0	EF1	EF2	EF3	EF4	EF5	Total
3	80	130	36	14	4	0	267

=== April 7 event ===
List of confirmed tornadoes – Tuesday, April 7, 2020 (Note: All dates are based on the local time zone where the tornado touched down; however, all times are in Coordinated Universal Time for consistency.)
EF#	Location	County / Parish	State	Start Coord.	Time (UTC)	Path length	Max width
EF1	SSE of Grafton to SE of Medina	Lorain, Medina	OH	41.2387°N 82.0136°W	03:25–03:38	11.45 mi (18.43 km)	100 yd (91 m)
EF1	A barn was destroyed, and extensive tree and power line damage occurred.						
EF1	N of Barberton to S of Green	Summit	OH	41.0334°N 81.6023°W	03:52–04:03	9.81 mi (15.79 km)	100 yd (91 m)
EF1	Power lines and numerous trees were blown down. Some trees fell on homes, outbuildings, and cars.						

=== April 8 event ===
List of confirmed tornadoes – Wednesday, April 8, 2020
EF#	Location	County / Parish	State	Start Coord.	Time (UTC)	Path length	Max width
EF0	W of Massillon to SSE of Sandy Valley	Stark, Tuscarawas	OH	40.7953°N 81.5559°W	04:10–04:31	15.74 mi (25.33 km)	100 yd (91 m)
EF0	A few houses and other structures sustained minor to moderate damage and several trees were uprooted, some of which fell on homes.						
EF1	NE of East Fairfield to WNW of Achor	Columbiana	OH	40.827°N 80.630°W	04:33–04:38	5.48 mi (8.82 km)	250 yd (230 m)
EF1	Metal roof panels and shingles were ripped off, and many trees were snapped or uprooted.						
EF0	Union Ridge, OH to NW of Blackhawk, PA	Columbiana (OH), Beaver (PA)	OH, PA	40.775°N 80.562°W	04:37–04:41	3.82 mi (6.15 km)	100 yd (91 m)
EF0	Trees were snapped or uprooted.						
EF1	NW of Tarentum to New Kensington	Allegheny, Westmoreland	PA	40.625°N 79.795°W	05:11–05:18	3.83 mi (6.16 km)	150 yd (140 m)
EF1	Buildings and carports were damaged in Tarentum, as well as numerous trees.						
EF0	Braeburn to Lower Burrell	Westmoreland	PA	40.607°N 79.715°W	05:17–05:18	0.15 mi (0.24 km)	75 yd (69 m)
EF0	Shingles and fences were damaged, and lawn furniture was tossed. Trees and tree limbs were snapped and uprooted.						
EF0	Ray City to NW of Lakeland	Berrien, Lanier	GA	31.0714°N 83.1965°W	00:22–00:30	4.41 mi (7.10 km)	300 yd (270 m)
EF0	Trees and buildings sustained minor damage in Ray City.						
EF1	Mooresville	Morgan	IN	39.6133°N 86.3771°W	00:43–00:46	0.97 mi (1.56 km)	35 yd (32 m)
EF1	The roof of a brick building was lifted off in downtown Mooresville, collapsing a brick wall into the street. Other buildings and trees were damaged as well.						
EF0	SW of Cash	Craighead	AR	35.7303°N 90.9859°W	00:47–00:50	0.89 mi (1.43 km)	30 yd (27 m)
EF0	A short-lived tornado damaged a farm building.						
EF2	NE of Weiner to Harrisburg	Poinsett	AR	35.6567°N 90.8562°W	01:05–01:26	9.33 mi (15.02 km)	75 yd (69 m)
EF2	This tornado initially tracked mainly over open fields, completely destroying a mobile home before entering Harrisburg, where multiple homes were either heavily damaged or destroyed. One frail home was leveled, and trees in town were damaged. Two people were injured.						
EF1	Southwestern Versailles	Ripley	IN	39.0631°N 85.2627°W	01:59–02:01	2.49 mi (4.01 km)	450 yd (410 m)
EF1	Homes, trees, and the roof of a shopping center sustained some damage. Power lines were knocked down.						
EF0	Cross Plains	Ripley	IN	38.9440°N 85.2051°W	02:06–02:07	0.18 mi (0.29 km)	75 yd (69 m)
EF0	A weak tornado caused damage to trees and the roofs of homes and businesses in town.						
EF1	SE of Versailles	Ripley	IN	39.0215°N 85.1699°W	02:08–02:11	2.6 mi (4.2 km)	220 yd (200 m)
EF1	Roof and siding damage was inflicted to homes and barns. Silos were destroyed and trees were damaged.						
EF0	SW of Dillsboro	Dearborn	IN	39.0026°N 85.0973°W	02:10–02:12	0.96 mi (1.54 km)	150 yd (140 m)
EF0	Barns were destroyed, and roofs and trees were damaged.						
EF0	SE of Cross Plains	Ohio	IN	38.9075°N 85.1216°W	02:11–02:12	0.15 mi (0.24 km)	60 yd (55 m)
EF0	A tornado destroyed a barn, caused roof and siding damage to homes, toppled trees, and rolled two recreational vehicles.						
EF0	SE of Dillsboro	Ohio	IN	38.9619°N 85.0432°W	02:13–02:17	5.73 mi (9.22 km)	450 yd (410 m)
EF0	A tornado caused widespread damage to roofs, siding, barns, and trees.						
EF0	W of Rising Sun	Ohio	IN	38.9580°N 84.9579°W	02:18–02:22	5.25 mi (8.45 km)	200 yd (180 m)
EF0	A tornado caused widespread damage to roofs, siding, barns, and trees.						
EF0	Mount Healthy	Hamilton	OH	39.2454°N 84.5951°W	02:22–02:29	6.2 mi (10.0 km)	300 yd (270 m)
EF0	Several buildings and a YMCA suffered minor damage. Numerous trees were downed and transmission poles were leaning or broken.						
EF0	E of Warsaw	Gallatin	KY	38.7863°N 84.8735°W	02:27–02:28	0.5 mi (0.80 km)	50 yd (46 m)
EF0	Several homes sustained roof, siding, and porch damage. Additional damage was inflicted to barns and outbuildings. Lastly, numerous trees were downed or damaged.						
EF0	Indian Hill	Hamilton	OH	39.2081°N 84.3556°W	02:37–02:40	3.3 mi (5.3 km)	350 yd (320 m)
EF0	Power poles and numerous trees were downed in Indian Hill. Some barns were also damaged.						
EF1	NW of Dry Ridge	Grant	KY	38.7145°N 84.6632°W	02:40–02:43	2.4 mi (3.9 km)	500 yd (460 m)
EF1	Numerous homes, trees, and large, mature trees were damaged.						
EF0	N of Bracht	Kenton	KY	38.8282°N 84.5918°W	02:42–02:43	1.2 mi (1.9 km)	100 yd (91 m)
EF0	Barn, siding, tree, and power pole damage was observed.						
EF1	E of Mount Zion to SE of Falmouth	Grant, Pendleton	KY	38.6748°N 84.5520°W	02:47–03:07	19.2 mi (30.9 km)	400 yd (370 m)
EF1	Several barns were destroyed in southern Pendleton County. Other outbuildings, barns, and homes sustained some roof damage. Numerous trees and power poles were downed as well.						
EF0	Newtonsville	Clermont, Brown	OH	39.1762°N 84.1050°W	02:50–03:00	8.8 mi (14.2 km)	200 yd (180 m)
EF0	This tornado caused minor damage to trees and structures in and around Newtonsville.						
EF0	Northern Edenton	Clermont	OH	39.2319°N 84.0696°W	02:53–02:55	0.8 mi (1.3 km)	75 yd (69 m)
EF0	Trees and the roofs of homes were damaged in the northern part of Edenton.						
EF0	SW of Fayetteville	Brown	OH	39.1592°N 83.978°W	02:56–02:59	2.4 mi (3.9 km)	50 yd (46 m)
EF0	A tornado damaged trees and one property.						
EF0	SE of Blanchester	Clinton, Brown	OH	39.2558°N 83.9598°W	03:01–03:03	0.88 mi (1.42 km)	50 yd (46 m)
EF0	Numerous trees were downed, and pole barns were damaged.						
EF0	N of Mount Olivet	Robertson	KY	38.5407°N 84.0441°W	03:16–03:17	1.03 mi (1.66 km)	50 yd (46 m)
EF0	Structures and trees were damaged.						
EF1	S of Fairfield	Nelson	KY	37.9206°N 85.4216°W	03:20–03:25	4 mi (6.4 km)	45 yd (41 m)
EF1	An EF1 tornado ripped portions of roofing from two homes, blew out the back of a well-built barn, and demolished an old barn and small shed. A wagon trailer was thrown through the barn. Pieces of lumber from these various structures were impaled into the ground. Trees were snapped, twisted, and uprooted along the path.						
EF0	SW of Mays Lick	Mason	KY	38.5104°N 83.9022°W	03:25–03:26	1.2 mi (1.9 km)	50 yd (46 m)
EF0	A brief tornado damaged structures and trees.						

=== April 9 event ===
List of confirmed tornadoes – Thursday, April 9, 2020
EF#	Location	County / Parish	State	Start Coord.	Time (UTC)	Path length	Max width
EF1	W of Wilkesville	Vinton	OH	39.0794°N 82.3565°W	04:33–04:34	0.25 mi (0.40 km)	125 yd (114 m)
EF1	Two mobile homes were shifted off their foundations, a garage was destroyed and several trees were uprooted.						

=== April 12 event ===
List of confirmed tornadoes – Sunday, April 12, 2020
EF#	Location	County / Parish	State	Start Coord.	Time (UTC)	Path length	Max width	Summary
EF1	SW of Ozona	Crockett	TX	30.5048°N 101.3172°W	06:03–06:16	5.62 mi (9.04 km)	250 yd (230 m)	A tornado snapped or uprooted multiple trees, damaged a power pole, downed electrical lines, and destroyed a deer blind and some fencing. The awning and AC unit of a mobile home were blown off as well.
EF1	NNW of Melvin to S of Pear Valley	McCulloch	TX	31.2145°N 99.5846°W	09:05–09:13	5.12 mi (8.24 km)	300 yd (270 m)	A tornado snapped or uprooted multiple oak trees and killed one calf. It also destroyed several deer feeders, overturned a truck and a cattle feeder, damaged large doors on a barn, and knocked over a fence.
EF1	NE of Fredericksburg to SE of Willow City	Gillespie	TX	30.3007°N 98.8248°W	09:40–09:56	11.56 mi (18.60 km)	150 yd (140 m)	A tornado caused extensive tree damage near Fredericksburg. One home sustained roof damage and a power line was knocked down as well.
EF1	Northern Round Mountain	Blanco, Burnet	TX	30.4397°N 98.3605°W	10:23–10:34	6.96 mi (11.20 km)	200 yd (180 m)	The tornado struck two RV parks at the north side of Round Mountain, damaging 49 residences, eight of which received major damage, and destroying 11. There were two minor injuries.
EF0	SE of Mexia	Limestone	TX	31.6552°N 96.4298°W	11:05–11:06	0.22 mi (0.35 km)	50 yd (46 m)	Area storm spotters observed this brief, weak tornado, which touched down within a larger area of damaging straight-line winds in Point Enterprise. Grass was flattened in a convergent pattern.
EF1	SE of Timpson	Shelby	TX	31.8921°N 94.3827°W	14:06–14:07	0.74 mi (1.19 km)	30 yd (27 m)	A brief tornado snapped or uprooted about 50 trees.
EF1	E of Gill to W of Jonesville	Harrison	TX	32.399°N 94.2764°W	14:08–14:20	10.59 mi (17.04 km)	100 yd (91 m)	Trees and power lines were downed along the path, including one tree that fell on a house.
EF2	N of Grand Cane to SSE of Frierson	Desoto	LA	32.1493°N 93.7946°W	14:41–14:53	9.05 mi (14.56 km)	400 yd (370 m)	Four single-wide manufactured homes were destroyed, two homes were partially unroofed and had exterior walls knocked down, a third home was unroofed with a portion of it being shifted off its foundation, and a fourth home lost parts of its roof and sustained damage to an exterior wall and its carport. Roof and shingle damage was inflicted to a church and additional homes as well. Hundreds of trees were also snapped or uprooted. One people was injured.
EF1	Benton	Bossier	LA	32.6975°N 93.7439°W	14:52–14:53	0.43 mi (0.69 km)	125 yd (114 m)	This brief tornado moved through the center of Benton. Several buildings in town suffered roof damage, including a feed store that had its flat roof covering ripped off. A single-family home had its roof removed and large porch dislodged and the bay doors at a fire station were blown in as well.
EF1	NE of Mansfield to NW of East Point	Desoto, Red River	LA	32.1448°N 93.5866°W	14:57–15:05	6.65 mi (10.70 km)	300 yd (270 m)	Numerous trees were snapped or uprooted.
EF1	SSE of Doyline to W of Heflin	Webster	LA	32.4272°N 93.3805°W	15:10–15:18	6.13 mi (9.87 km)	1,000 yd (910 m)	A large tornado caused roof damage to multiple homes, moved a small metal storage building several yards away from its foundation, and snapped or uprooted trees.
EF1	NW of Ashland	Bienville	LA	32.1488°N 93.1185°W	15:30–15:31	1.62 mi (2.61 km)	400 yd (370 m)	Widespread tree damage occurred, with numerous trees snapped at their trunks, and a few homes sustained minor roof damage. The path of the tornado likely continued on for another mile or two according to radar data, but the area was inaccessible to survey teams.
EF1	Northwestern Arcadia	Bienville	LA	32.5636°N 92.9451°W	15:39–15:44	0.77 mi (1.24 km)	75 yd (69 m)	A brief high-end EF1 tornado destroyed a small outbuilding, partially unroofed a house, and rolled a mobile home off its foundation.
EF3	Bawcomville to Southern Monroe to Monroe Regional Airport	Ouachita	LA	32.4706°N 92.1699°W	16:36–16:45	8.01 mi (12.89 km)	300 yd (270 m)	See section on this tornado
EF3	WSW of Fairbanks	Ouachita	LA	32.6215°N 92.0977°W	16:39–16:43	2.6 mi (4.2 km)	400 yd (370 m)	A low-end EF3 tornado ripped the roofs off of two single-family homes and inflicted shingle damage to ten other homes. An outbuilding was destroyed, four concrete poles were snapped, and hundreds of trees were snapped or uprooted, including some that were partially debarked. The tornado occurred simultaneously with the tornado listed above.
EF1	Fairbanks	Ouachita	LA	32.6452°N 92.035°W	16:46–16:48	1.14 mi (1.83 km)	50 yd (46 m)	A brief tornado snapped or uprooted approximately 30 trees.
EF1	E of Collinston	Morehouse	LA	32.6814°N 91.8239°W	17:02–17:06	3.03 mi (4.88 km)	200 yd (180 m)	One home sustained roof damage and a nearby shed was destroyed with debris scattered 100 yd (91 m) away. Multiple trees were snapped or uprooted.
EF2	ENE of Oak Ridge to NNW of Epps	Morehouse, Richland, West Carroll	LA	32.65°N 91.65°W	17:10–17:22	9.52 mi (15.32 km)	700 yd (640 m)	Multiple homes and mobile homes sustained minor roof damage, and motor home was overturned. Several sheds were also damaged. Low-end EF2 damage occurred as five power poles were snapped and numerous trees were snapped or uprooted in Bear Skin, including one tree that fell on and damaged a house.
EF1	WSW of Epps	Richland, West Carroll	LA	32.5597°N 91.5798°W	17:11–17:16	4.65 mi (7.48 km)	150 yd (140 m)	Twin tornadoes developed at the same time with this one being the western one. Multiple trees were uprooted, and an irrigation pivot was overturned.
EF1	W of Epps	Richland, West Carroll	LA	32.596°N 91.6168°W	17:11–17:20	6.18 mi (9.95 km)	700 yd (640 m)	Twin tornadoes developed at the same time with this one being the eastern one. Several trees were uprooted, and irrigation pivots were overturned.
EF0	Lake Providence	East Carroll	LA	32.7942°N 91.1793°W	17:41–17:43	1.16 mi (1.87 km)	170 yd (160 m)	A brief high-end EF0 tornado impacted Lake Providence, causing minor roof, facade, and window damage to homes, apartment buildings, and businesses in town. Minor and sporadic tree damage occurred along the path as well.
EF1	E of Cary	Sharkey	MS	32.787°N 90.8925°W	18:00–18:08	6.02 mi (9.69 km)	200 yd (180 m)	An area of downed trees consistent with a high-end EF1 tornado was noted on satellite imagery in the Delta National Forest, which corresponded with a TDS that was noted on radar when the storm moved through the area. A ground survey was impossible due to backwater flooding.
EF1	SE of Louise	Humphreys	MS	32.9296°N 90.5931°W	18:17–18:22	4.09 mi (6.58 km)	440 yd (400 m)	A mobile home had its roof torn off and was pushed off its foundation by this high-end EF1 tornado. Numerous trees and power poles were snapped.
EF2	NW of Yazoo City	Yazoo	MS	32.8574°N 90.5208°W	18:22–18:32	7.38 mi (11.88 km)	250 yd (230 m)	A small and poorly anchored home of wood construction was obliterated and swept away. Several power poles and trees were snapped, and four outbuildings were destroyed with a fifth one being unroofed as well.
EF0	ENE of Eden	Holmes	MS	33.0049°N 90.2608°W	18:46–18:48	2.33 mi (3.75 km)	50 yd (46 m)	A brief tornado caused minor damage to an outbuilding and a few trees.
EF1	W of Sallis	Attala	MS	32.9961°N 89.8541°W	19:06–19:09	2.46 mi (3.96 km)	500 yd (460 m)	Numerous trees were snapped and a home sustained roof damage.
EF0	E of McCool	Choctaw	MS	33.1961°N 89.3018°W	19:47–19:51	3.04 mi (4.89 km)	150 yd (140 m)	A short-lived tornado caused minor tree damage.
EF2	NW of Macon to E of Brooksville	Noxubee	MS	33.1469°N 88.6044°W	20:30–20:40	8.49 mi (13.66 km)	1,100 yd (1,000 m)	A large rain-wrapped tornado downed six large electrical transmission poles, damaged some metal lumber storage warehouses, and caused extensive tree and power line damage. A house sustained roof damage, a pivot irrigation sprinkler was flipped and thrown, and four chicken houses were damaged.
EF4	SW of Sartinville to SW of Bassfield	Walthall, Lawrence, Marion, Jefferson Davis	MS	31.2763°N 90.1732°W	20:39–21:06	21.17 mi (34.07 km)	1,936 yd (1,770 m)	4 deaths – See section on this tornado – At least three people were injured.
EF1	W of Tom Bevill Lock and Dam	Noxubee	MS	33.2352°N 88.4308°W	20:42–20:48	3.89 mi (6.26 km)	375 yd (343 m)	Many trees were snapped or uprooted.
EF4	SSW of Bassfield to NNE of Pachuta	Jefferson Davis, Covington, Jones, Jasper, Clarke	MS	31.4641°N 89.7579°W	21:12–22:28	67.43 mi (108.52 km)	3,960 yd (3,620 m)	8 deaths – See an article on this tornado – 99 people were injured.
EF0	SSE of Ethelsville	Pickens	AL	33.3697°N 88.1937°W	21:01–21:03	1.51 mi (2.43 km)	200 yd (180 m)	A tornado snapped or felled multiple trees.
EF0	N of Zion to W of Newtonville	Pickens, Fayette	AL	33.4593°N 87.8859°W	21:18–21:26	5.45 mi (8.77 km)	300 yd (270 m)	A tornado snapped or uprooted multiple trees.
EF0	SE of Fayette	Fayette	AL	33.5878°N 87.7504°W	21:34–21:36	1.79 mi (2.88 km)	350 yd (320 m)	A brief tornado uprooted several trees and snapped tree limbs.
EF3	ESE of Topeka to SW of Rose Hill	Lawrence, Jefferson Davis, Covington, Jones, Smith, Jasper	MS	31.3712°N 90.1101°W	21:36–23:07	83.22 mi (133.93 km)	2,041 yd (1,866 m)	See section on this tornado – At least two people were injured.
EF1	SSE of Berry to NNW of Boley Springs	Fayette, Walker	AL	33.6264°N 87.5872°W	21:41–21:49	6.14 mi (9.88 km)	600 yd (550 m)	A tornado uprooted several trees and snapped tree limbs. A few homes also had shingle damage.
EF1	S of Cordova to S of Dora	Walker	AL	33.6319°N 87.2022°W	22:04–22:16	8.98 mi (14.45 km)	950 yd (870 m)	This tornado began just south of the Gorgas Steam Plant and moved northeast, crossing the Mulberry Fork River several times. Numerous trees were snapped or uprooted, some of which fell on homes. Additional homes had minor roof damage.
EF2	SE of Dora to E of Sumiton	Walker, Jefferson	AL	33.6991°N 87.0534°W	22:14–22:25	6.91 mi (11.12 km)	940 yd (860 m)	A large, strong tornado destroyed a metal building, ripped the roofs off a few homes, and inflicted less severe damage to several other homes. Trees were snapped or uprooted as well, some of which landed on houses.
EF2	S of Pachuta to Eastern Enterprise	Clarke	MS	32.0015°N 88.8943°W	22:22–22:39	14.29 mi (23.00 km)	300 yd (270 m)	This strong tornado passed east of Pachuta and west of Stonewall, before striking the east side of Enterprise. A mobile home was destroyed, a site-built home sustained heavy roof damage, the back wall of a church was collapsed, and numerous trees were snapped. Two people were injured. The tornado formed to the east of and was on the ground simultaneously with the long-tracked EF4 tornado during the beginning of its life.
EF0	SW of Locust Fork	Blount	AL	33.8819°N 86.6877°W	22:44–22:45	0.47 mi (0.76 km)	125 yd (114 m)	A brief, weak tornado downed several trees. Two homes sustained minor roof damage.
EF1	W of Locust Fork	Blount	AL	33.8977°N 86.6549°W	22:47–22:51	3.84 mi (6.18 km)	225 yd (206 m)	A tornado snapped or uprooted numerous trees. Two homes and one vehicle suffered damage from fallen trees.
EF1	S of Meridian	Lauderdale	MS	32.2571°N 88.6932°W	22:47–22:49	2.88 mi (4.63 km)	300 yd (270 m)	Two homes sustained minor roof damage, and several trees were uprooted. This was the fourth and final tornado produced by the supercell that produced the EF4 tornadoes.
EF2	W of Oneonta to E of Rosa	Blount	AL	33.9384°N 86.5677°W	22:50–22:57	5.56 mi (8.95 km)	500 yd (460 m)	A house suffered moderate roof damage, and another was swept off its foundation and blown 60 ft (18 m) away, leaving the structure heavily damaged. A mobile home was rolled off its foundation, two sheds were destroyed, and numerous trees were snapped or uprooted.
EF1	W of Altoona	Blount	AL	34.0264°N 86.3916°W	23:04–23:05	0.78 mi (1.26 km)	115 yd (105 m)	Numerous trees were snapped or uprooted. At least three farm buildings and a large silo were damaged on a farm property.
EF1	NW of Ramsey to ESE of Ridgeville	Etowah	AL	33.9987°N 86.1577°W	23:08–23:13	5.52 mi (8.88 km)	525 yd (480 m)	Damage was primarily limited to snapped or uprooted trees, though one home sustained minor roof and porch damage.
EF1	NW of Rose Hill to Western Enterprise	Jasper, Clarke	MS	32.1209°N 88.9602°W	23:10–23:17	8.87 mi (14.27 km)	985 yd (901 m)	A large tornado formed after the long-tracked Oak Vale EF3 tornado dissipated. It snapped or uprooted numerous trees along its path, and inflicted roof damage to homes in the western part of Enterprise.
EF2	SE of Snead to S of Crossville	Blount, Etowah, Marshall, Dekalb	AL	34.0721°N 86.3249°W	23:10–23:33	21.74 mi (34.99 km)	440 yd (400 m)	A strong tornado struck a residential area at the southwestern edge of Boaz, where numerous homes were damaged, some significantly with loss of roofs and exterior walls. One unanchored home was pushed off its foundation and completely destroyed, and a metal industrial building was also heavily damaged. Several self-storage units were destroyed as well. Elsewhere along the path, numerous trees were snapped or uprooted, and a few other homes sustained roof damage. Three people were injured.
EF2	NE of Attalla to NE of Keener	Etowah	AL	34.0419°N 86.0704°W	23:14–23:28	12.19 mi (19.62 km)	875 yd (800 m)	Large swaths of trees were flattened along the path, with numerous large trees snapped or uprooted in and around Reece City. Several of these trees landed on homes and outbuildings, and many power poles were snapped as well. A barn was also significantly damaged, and a few homes sustained roof damage.
EF2	NW of Summerville to SE of LaFayette	Chattooga, Walker	GA	34.4990°N 85.3689°W	00:15–00:32	14.73 mi (23.71 km)	800 yd (730 m)	The entire second story of a house was destroyed, another home had its garage collapsed and a large portion of its roof removed, while shingles and siding were ripped off of other homes. A trailer was destroyed, a barn was heavily damaged, and numerous large trees were snapped or uprooted along the path. A jeep was tossed more than 150 yd (140 m), and a 10,000 lb (4,500 kg) camper was overturned.
EF1	Carbon Hill	Walker	AL	33.8795°N 87.5472°W	01:12–01:16	2.9 mi (4.7 km)	1,000 yd (910 m)	A large, high-end EF1 tornado moved directly through Carbon Hill, where considerable damage to homes and some businesses occurred, a few of which had large portions of their roofs ripped off. A gas station canopy was blown over and flipped upside-down; a church was destroyed; and several mobile homes were either rolled and demolished, shifted off their block piers, or sustained significant loss of roofs and walls. Dozens of trees were snapped or uprooted, some of which landed on homes. Outbuildings were destroyed as well, and three people were injured.
EF1	N of Holt to SSW of Bankhead Lake Dam	Tuscaloosa	AL	33.2831°N 87.5015°W	01:33–01:44	9.86 mi (15.87 km)	230 yd (210 m)	A tornado touched down near the NorthRiver Yacht Club community, causing extensive tree damage and minor roof damage to homes from fallen trees. It then crossed the Black Warrior River, snapping or uprooting hundreds of trees in the area before dissipating just west of the Jefferson County border.
EF2	NW of Chatsworth to SW of Cisco	Murray	GA	34.8098°N 84.8377°W	01:45–01:55	8.88 mi (14.29 km)	860 yd (790 m)	8 deaths – See section on this tornado – 24 people were injured.
EF1	E of Wilson Bend	Cullman	AL	33.9984°N 87.0368°W	01:51–01:56	2.97 mi (4.78 km)	200 yd (180 m)	Several chicken houses were destroyed, dozens of trees were uprooted, and a shed was damaged.
EF1	S of Good Hope to NW of Hanceville	Cullman	AL	34.0736°N 86.8747°W	02:00–02:09	5.42 mi (8.72 km)	300 yd (270 m)	Dozens of trees were snapped or uprooted, a single-wide trailer had its roof blown off, and a gas station was damaged.
EF1	SW of Cullomburg	Choctaw	AL	31.7065°N 88.3161°W	02:03–02:04	0.41 mi (0.66 km)	450 yd (410 m)	A brief tornado snapped numerous trees within a broader area of straight-line winds. In November 2023, this tornado was reanalyzed and had its width expanded from 75 yd (69 m) to 450 yd (410 m) based on the extent of deforestation noted in high-resolution Planet satellite imagery.
EF1	NNE of Hanceville	Cullman	AL	34.1329°N 86.7377°W	02:11–02:12	0.35 mi (0.56 km)	70 yd (64 m)	A brief tornado destroyed a small shed and uprooted several trees.
EF2	SE of Welti to SW of Holly Pond	Cullman	AL	34.1239°N 86.7087°W	02:12–02:16	2.5 mi (4.0 km)	350 yd (320 m)	A tornado touched down near the Duck River and uprooted numerous trees in the area. Two homes and a barn had their roofs completely removed.
EF1	West Bend	Clarke	AL	31.7980°N 88.1340°W	02:16–02:17	0.77 mi (1.24 km)	100 yd (91 m)	A brief tornado snapped numerous trees within a broader area of straight-line winds.
EF1	NNE of Brooksville to NNE of Mclarty	Blount, Marshall	AL	34.2201°N 86.459°W	02:30–02:35	4.97 mi (8.00 km)	200 yd (180 m)	Dozens of trees were uprooted, and a couple of homes sustained minor roof damage.
EF1	N of Vineland to ESE of Lamison	Marengo, Wilcox	AL	32.0443°N 87.6583°W	02:41–02:49	8.05 mi (12.96 km)	1,000 yd (910 m)	A large tornado snapped or uprooted numerous trees, one of which landed on a mobile home, causing severe damage to the structure.
EF1	SE of Higdon, AL to S of Trenton, GA	Dekalb (AL), Dade (GA)	AL, GA	34.8349°N 85.6120°W	02:50–03:05	7.54 mi (12.13 km)	350 yd (320 m)	A tornado tore large sections of roofing off a church and a metal building. Mobile homes sustained minor damage, a small outbuilding was destroyed, and trees were snapped. The tornado continued into Georgia where it damaged nearly 100 homes in and around the city of Trenton.
EF1	ESE of Heiberger	Perry	AL	32.7317°N 87.2012°W	03:14–03:18	2.42 mi (3.89 km)	350 yd (320 m)	A church had part of its roof torn off, and a nearby building on the property was destroyed. Extensive tree damage occurred along the path.
EF3	Fort Oglethorpe, GA to S of McDonald, TN	Catoosa (GA), Hamilton (TN), Bradley (TN)	GA, TN	34.9407°N 85.2582°W	03:15–03:33	19.34 mi (31.12 km)	1,500 yd (1,400 m)	2 deaths – See section on this tornado – A total of 18 people were injured.
EF0	NE of Collinsville	DeKalb	AL	34.2744°N 85.8560°W	03:22–03:28	3.56 mi (5.73 km)	110 yd (100 m)	Several trees were downed, and a small barn was destroyed.
EF0	SE of Sardis to S of Tyler	Dallas	AL	32.2440°N 86.9515°W	03:27–03:31	3.8 mi (6.1 km)	400 yd (370 m)	A tornado caused extensive tree damage along its path.
EF2	Eastern Cleveland	Bradley	TN	35.1613°N 84.864°W	03:45–03:50	3.04 mi (4.89 km)	500 yd (460 m)	A strong tornado caused significant damage in the eastern part of Cleveland, where 26 homes or mobile homes were destroyed, 23 sustained major damage, and 62 had minor damage. A church and a storage garage also sustained heavy damage. A small metal truss transmission tower was blown over, and a metal industrial building sustained damage. Numerous trees were snapped or uprooted along the path. Six people were injured.
EF1	E of Cleveland	Bradley	TN	35.1663°N 84.8242°W	03:50–03:55	5.09 mi (8.19 km)	500 yd (460 m)	Several homes sustained significant roof damage and barns were destroyed. Hundreds of trees were snapped or uprooted.
EF1	E of Tasso	Bradley, Polk	TN	35.2046°N 84.7751°W	03:55–04:00	4.73 mi (7.61 km)	500 yd (460 m)	Hundreds of trees were snapped or uprooted and a few homes sustained minor damage.

=== April 13 event ===
List of confirmed tornadoes – Monday, April 13, 2020
EF#	Location	County / Parish	State	Start Coord.	Time (UTC)	Path length	Max width	Summary
EF0	WNW of Cave Spring	Floyd	GA	34.1239°N 85.3675°W	04:31–04:32	0.13 mi (0.21 km)	50 yd (46 m)	Several trees were downed and large tree limbs were broken off by a brief tornado.
EF0	N of Lindale to W of Rome	Floyd	GA	34.1924°N 85.1735°W	04:42–04:45	3.21 mi (5.17 km)	50 yd (46 m)	A brief tornado downed multiple trees, some of which fell on power lines.
EF1	Ladds to E of White	Bartow	GA	34.1492°N 84.8285°W	05:06–05:21	12.76 mi (20.54 km)	250 yd (230 m)	1 death – A tornado touched down west-southwest of Cartersville in the Ladds area, causing minor damage to a small business and downing fences. In southwestern Cartersville, a large oak tree fell on a house, killing the sleeping occupant. Mostly minor tree damage occurred elsewhere in town. The tornado continued to the northeast of Cartersville, where numerous trees were snapped or uprooted, power lines were downed, and one home was damaged. The tornado continued into the Pine Log Wildlife Management Area where 60–70 trees were downed before it dissipated. Two people were injured.
EF1	SSW of Salacoa Valley	Cherokee	GA	34.3524°N 84.6028°W	05:32–05:33	0.71 mi (1.14 km)	100 yd (91 m)	This tornado was spawned by the same circulation that produced the previous tornado. Around 250 to 300 trees were downed northwest of Waleska.
EF0	NW of Waverly Hall	Harris	GA	32.7279°N 84.7294°W	05:53–05:55	3.76 mi (6.05 km)	50 yd (46 m)	Several trees in a remote and forested area were downed.
EF0	NW of Woodland	Talbot	GA	32.7516°N 84.5144°W	06:08–06:10	2.94 mi (4.73 km)	100 yd (91 m)	Trees downed by the tornado blocked several roads.
EF3	S of Thomaston to NW of Redbone	Upson, Lamar	GA	32.8496°N 84.3335°W	06:19–06:35	16.63 mi (26.76 km)	1,200 yd (1,100 m)	This large, intense tornado damaged or destroyed dozens of homes, mobile homes, and outbuildings along its path. One home was pushed off its foundation into the middle of a road, leaving it largely intact. Numerous trees were snapped or uprooted as well. A total of 159 structures were affected by the tornado, with seven destroyed, 20 with major damage, and 38 sustaining minor damage. The National Weather Service's WSR-88D radar detected debris lofted up to 25,000 ft (7,600 m) while this tornado was on the ground.
EF0	NNE of Union City	Fulton	GA	33.6288°N 84.5263°W	06:36–06:39	2.75 mi (4.43 km)	50 yd (46 m)	A short-lived tornado snapped or uprooted many trees; debris was detected by the local NWS's radar up to 1,000 ft (300 m).
EF3	SW of Collier to NNW of Forsyth	Monroe	GA	33.0928°N 84.033°W	06:40–06:47	5.3 mi (8.5 km)	300 yd (270 m)	This tornado was spawned by the same circulation that produced the previous EF3 tornado. A large metal-framed building was completely destroyed, with concrete footings ripped out of the ground. A small home was destroyed, with a small plane, a tractor, and a boat flipped nearby. Some vehicles were flipped and thrown as well, and numerous trees were downed along the path, one of which fell onto a home. One person was injured. NWS radar detected debris up to 19,000 ft (5,800 m).
EF1	W of Raoul to SSW of Boydville	Hall, Habersham, Banks, Stephens	GA	33.456°N 83.6449°W	06:49–07:06	14.31 mi (23.03 km)	200 yd (180 m)	This was the first tornado from the Seneca supercell. Numerous trees were snapped or uprooted, and one mobile home sustained minor to moderate roof damage.
EF1	WNW of Payne	Bibb	GA	32.873°N 83.7718°W	07:00–07:04	3.68 mi (5.92 km)	300 yd (270 m)	This tornado touched down near I-475, causing minor roof damage to two hotels and a Walmart. A nearby Walgreens had all of its windows blown out and a hole punctured into its roof. A gas station canopy also had metal sheeting torn off. Extensive tree damage occurred farther along the path, with several falling on homes.
EF1	S of Boydville to NE of Eastanollee	Stephens	GA	34.513°N 83.367°W	07:07–07:15	8.73 mi (14.05 km)	500 yd (460 m)	Numerous trees were snapped or uprooted and a few homes sustained considerable damage as a result of this high-end EF1 tornado. This was the second tornado produced by the Seneca tornado.
EF1	NW of Salem	Oconee	SC	34.99°N 83.055°W	07:18–07:22	3.97 mi (6.39 km)	400 yd (370 m)	Hundreds of trees were snapped or uprooted. The tornado path may have extended into the Sumter National Forest and into Pickens County, but no additional damage was visible from accessible areas.
EF1	Willard to WSW of Phoenix	Putnam	GA	33.3098°N 83.4961°W	07:18–07:34	12.91 mi (20.78 km)	300 yd (270 m)	A tornado touched down in the Chattahoochee–Oconee National Forest, snapping or uprooting hundreds of trees across the park. Three homes sustained minor roof damage, while a silo and nearby barn sustained damage as well. One person was injured.
EF3	SSE of Westminster to Seneca to W of Central	Oconee, Pickens	SC	34.617°N 83.084°W	07:21–07:36	16.71 mi (26.89 km)	1,000 yd (910 m)	1 death – See section on this tornado – Five people were injured.
EF1	NNW of Reynolds Plantation to Veazey	Greene	GA	33.4443°N 83.228°W	07:38–07:47	6.4 mi (10.3 km)	350 yd (320 m)	This tornado was spawned by the same circulation that produced the previous EF1 tornado. The tornado moved through a residential subdivision, snapping or uprooting numerous trees. Several well-built homes sustained direct damage or impacts from airborne debris. At Lake Oconee, numerous boathouses sustained major damage and a dock was lofted and thrown onshore. After crossing, the lake the tornado felled many more trees, several of which fell on homes. It later dissipated as it moved into Veaszy. A total of 35–40 homes were damaged by the tornado.
EF2	S of Pumpkintown	Pickens, Greenville	SC	34.966°N 82.667°W	07:41–07:49	7.97 mi (12.83 km)	200 yd (180 m)	Two mobile homes were destroyed and numerous trees were snapped or uprooted. Three people were injured.
EF0	SW of Berea to WSW of Easley	Pickens	SC	34.817°N 82.638°W	07:44–07:51	7.42 mi (11.94 km)	70 yd (64 m)	Trees were downed along the path.
EF0	NW of Greer	Greenville	SC	34.992°N 82.295°W	08:01–08:02	0.68 mi (1.09 km)	30 yd (27 m)	Trees were snapped or uprooted. One uprooted tree fell on a house.
EF0	SW of Oconee	Washington	GA	32.8329°N 82.9698°W	08:01–08:03	1.66 mi (2.67 km)	50 yd (46 m)	Damage along the path was limited to trees.
EF1	NNW of Warthen	Washington	GA	33.1199°N 82.8228°W	08:05–08:09	3.08 mi (4.96 km)	100 yd (91 m)	Multiple trees were uprooted.
EF1	SW of Mitchell	Washington	GA	33.1992°N 82.7831°W	08:12–08:14	1.01 mi (1.63 km)	100 yd (91 m)	A brief tornado snapped hundreds softwood trees.
EF1	NE of Harrison to S of Bartow	Washington, Jefferson	GA	33.8613°N 82.6972°W	08:18–08:32	14.22 mi (22.88 km)	220 yd (200 m)	Hundreds of softwood-type trees were snapped, dozens of homes were damaged, and two vehicles were thrown 100 yards (91 m).
EF2	NE of Vidette to ESE of Hephzibah	Burke	GA	33.1066°N 82.1918°W	08:53–09:07	16.49 mi (26.54 km)	700 yd (640 m)	A cinder-block automotive business sustained uplift of its roof and partial collapse of its walls, and a home sustained roof and exterior wall loss. A dairy farm suffered extensive damage, and hundreds of trees were snapped or uprooted, some of which landed on homes and vehicles.
EF3	W of Savannah River Site to WNW of Neeses	Aiken, Barnwell, Orangeburg	SC	33.2751°N 81.7048°W	09:21–10:03	37.88 mi (60.96 km)	800 yd (730 m)	A few frame homes sustained roof loss and collapse of exterior walls, and some mobile homes were damaged or destroyed by this intense, long-tracked tornado. A brick shed, a vacant cinder-block business, and a cinder-block workshop building were completely destroyed. Another business had a large portion of its roof removed and an exterior wall blown out, and a metal automotive service building had its roof and multiple exterior walls ripped off. Vehicles were moved and damaged and power poles were snapped. Large swaths of trees were flattened along the path, some of which were partially debarked. Trees were also downed in the town of Springfield before the tornado dissipated, a few of which landed on a home and a church.
EF3	WNW of Snelling to SW of Elko	Barnwell	SC	33.2754°N 81.5438°W	09:33–09:42	8.49 mi (13.66 km)	50 yd (46 m)	A small, but strong tornado moved through the Crackerneck Wildlife Management Area and Ecological Reserve, snapping, denuding, and partially debarking numerous trees.
EF1	W of Ty Ty	Worth, Tift	GA	31.48°N 83.7°W	09:36–09:40	3.62 mi (5.83 km)	100 yd (91 m)	A brief tornado caused minor structural damage and extensive tree damage.
EF3	S of Elko to WSW of St. Matthews	Barnwell, Orangeburg, Calhoun	SC	33.3158°N 81.3944°W	09:43–10:20	35.68 mi (57.42 km)	770 yd (700 m)	2 deaths – A strong, long-tracked tornado caused severe damage along its path and passed near Livingston, heavily damaging or destroying multiple homes. One unanchored frame home was leveled, and several anchored double-wide manufactured homes were completely swept away and obliterated, with their frames thrown hundreds of yards. There were two fatalities in one of the homes. Numerous trees were snapped, denuded, and partially debarked along the path, many power poles were snapped, and a pivot irrigation system was flipped. Some outbuildings were destroyed as well. At least seven people were injured. This tornado was also notable in the fact that it absorbed the circulations of the two previous EF3 tornadoes near Livingston and Elko respectively.
EF3	S of Blackville	Barnwell	SC	33.3177°N 81.2903°W	09:49–09:51	1.39 mi (2.24 km)	40 yd (37 m)	A small, brief, but strong tornado touched down at a farm and collapsed several chicken houses. After intensifying across an open field, the tornado struck and severely damaged a fiberglass coating facility. Large steel support beams in a 22,500 sq ft (2,090 m^{2}) warehouse at this location were twisted. Thirty cylindrical containers, each weighing 20,000–25,000 lb (9,100–11,300 kg), were lifted from their saddles and rolled through the building. Thereafter, the tornado quickly weakened and dissipated near SC 3.
EF3	SE of Hilda	Barnwell	SC	33.2071°N 81.2742°W	09:50–09:55	5.37 mi (8.64 km)	800 yd (730 m)	A cinder-block garage had its metal roof peeled off and cinder blocks shifted about halfway up its wall. A well-built, bolted down metal building and a tin tractor shed were completely destroyed. A home had its roof lifted off, and a two-story wood-frame building behind it was shifted off its foundation and completely destroyed. A nearby unanchored log cabin was destroyed as well, and numerous trees were snapped or uprooted along the path.
EF1	E of Blythewood	Richland	SC	34.1556°N 80.919°W	09:53–09:59	4.89 mi (7.87 km)	80 yd (73 m)	Numerous trees were snapped or uprooted. Several homes sustained minor shingle, soffit, and fascia damage.
EF1	NE of Newington, GA	Screven (GA), Hampton (SC)	GA, SC	32.6516°N 81.487°W	09:58–10:06	5.9 mi (9.5 km)	200 yd (180 m)	Many trees were snapped or uprooted, some of which landed on structures. A mobile home had its roof ripped off, and a small cabin had a portion of its roof ripped off as well. This was the first of 12 tornadoes in a tornado family that traveled to Murrells Inlet, South Carolina.
EF1	ESE of Harding to WNW of Gladys	Irwin	GA	31.5°N 83.32°W	10:01–10:04	1.92 mi (3.09 km)	50 yd (46 m)	A brief tornado snapped many trees.
EF0	SE of Sycamore	Allendale	SC	33.0123°N 81.2167°W	10:04–10:09	5.85 mi (9.41 km)	300 yd (270 m)	A brief tornado caused sporadic tree damage.
EF4	WNW of Scotia to NNE of Fechtig	Hampton	SC	32.7045°N 81.2899°W	10:10–10:37	23.73 mi (38.19 km)	1,300 yd (1,200 m)	5 deaths – See article on this tornado – A total of 60 people were injured. This was the second of 12 tornadoes in a tornado family that traveled from near Newington, Georgia to Murrells Inlet, South Carolina.
EF2	NE of Rowesville	Orangeburg, Calhoun	SC	33.4032°N 80.787°W	10:25–10:37	10.23 mi (16.46 km)	700 yd (640 m)	A tractor dealership had its front windows blown out and the overhead doors blown in. Numerous trees were snapped or uprooted, several of which caused roof damage to buildings. Multiple pivot irrigation systems were overturned, power poles were snapped, and grain silos and outbuildings were damaged.
EF1	SW of Saxapahaw	Alamance	NC	35.8943°N 79.3544°W	10:32–10:40	4.53 mi (7.29 km)	440 yd (400 m)	A high-end EF1 tornado caused considerable damage to buildings at a sawmill. Multiple homes sustained roof damage, and one home had its roof blown off entirely. Numerous sheds, garages, and outbuildings were destroyed, and many trees were snapped or uprooted along the path. Some of these trees landed on and damaged homes.
EF2	NE of Morven	Anson	NC	34.8826°N 79.9797°W	10:34–10:35	0.19 mi (0.31 km)	75 yd (69 m)	A brief but strong tornado destroyed two chicken houses and knocked a mobile home off its foundation, rotating the structure 180° in the process.
EF0	SE of Ambrose	Coffee	GA	31.55°N 82.96°W	10:39–10:41	1.18 mi (1.90 km)	125 yd (114 m)	A few mobile homes were heavily damaged, a truck was overturned onto its side, and trees and fences were downed.
EF1	E of Morven	Anson	NC	34.8221°N 80.0284°W	10:45–10:50	8.82 mi (14.19 km)	200 yd (180 m)	A high-end EF1 tornado tracked through predominantly wooded areas, causing widespread tree damage. Many homes were damaged by the fallen trees, six or seven of which were destroyed. Outbuildings and vehicles were also damaged or destroyed.
EF1	SE of Islandton	Colleton	SC	32.8359°N 80.8539°W	10:39–10:41	1.44 mi (2.32 km)	50 yd (46 m)	A couple dozen trees were snapped along the path. This was the third of 12 tornadoes in a tornado family that traveled from near Newington, Georgia to Murrells Inlet, South Carolina.
EF1	WSW of Walterboro	Colleton	SC	32.8768°N 80.7459°W	10:46–10:50	3.14 mi (5.05 km)	100 yd (91 m)	Hundreds of trees were snapped or uprooted, and a tractor trailer was overturned. A tornado emergency was issued for this storm, which had produced an EF4 tornado just minutes earlier. This was the fourth of 12 tornadoes in a tornado family that traveled from near Newington, Georgia to Murrells Inlet, South Carolina.
EF1	Walterboro to WSW of Norman Landing	Colleton	SC	32.8791°N 80.7305°W	10:47–11:00	17.33 mi (27.89 km)	500 yd (460 m)	1 death – Many hundreds of trees were snapped or uprooted by this high-end EF1 tornado. Hundreds of residences and some businesses in Walterboro were damaged by tornadic winds or fallen trees, including a large tree that fell onto a home, killing an occupant. At the Low Country Regional Airport, most hangars were destroyed and nearly two dozen aircraft were damaged or destroyed. One person was injured. A tornado emergency was issued for this storm, which had produced an EF4 tornado just minutes earlier. This was the fifth of 12 tornadoes in a tornado family that traveled from near Newington, Georgia to Murrells Inlet, South Carolina.
EF1	NW of Givhans	Dorchester	SC	33.0211°N 80.3667°W	11:10–11:14	2.29 mi (3.69 km)	100 yd (91 m)	Many trees were snapped or uprooted, and a two-ton wood crate container was lifted and overturned. This was the sixth of 12 tornadoes in a tornado family that traveled from near Newington, Georgia to Murrells Inlet, South Carolina.
EF1	Odum	Wayne	GA	31.67°N 82.03°W	11:25–11:30	4.75 mi (7.64 km)	440 yd (400 m)	A high-end EF1 tornado touched down in Odum, where trees were snapped, multiple homes sustained roof damage, and one small home was shifted off its foundation and heavily damaged. Outside of town, additional trees were snapped, a detached garage was severely damaged, and a house sustained broken windows and shingle damage. Eight people were injured.
EF1	WSW of Ludowici	Long	GA	31.6923°N 81.8373°W	11:37–11:43	3.2 mi (5.1 km)	500 yd (460 m)	A tornado was identified by high-resolution satellite imagery over the Griffin Ridge Wildlife Management Area. Trees were snapped and uprooted.
EF3	Eastern Moncks Corner	Berkeley	SC	33.1816°N 79.9901°W	11:38–11:48	5.74 mi (9.24 km)	400 yd (370 m)	A strong tornado touched down in a subdivision at the east edge Moncks Corner, where a large two-story home had its entire second floor destroyed, and sustained collapse of a few first-floor exterior walls. Significant damage to several other homes, trailers, and vehicles also occurred in this area. The tornado continued to the east of town, completely destroying a mobile home and heavily damaging a few frame homes. Multiple other homes sustained minor to moderate damage, and numerous trees were snapped or uprooted. Six people were injured. This was the seventh of 12 tornadoes in a tornado family that traveled from near Newington, Georgia to Murrells Inlet, South Carolina.
EF0	E of Ludowici	Long	GA	31.6877°N 81.6861°W	11:47–11:48	0.36 mi (0.58 km)	100 yd (91 m)	A few trees were downed, and two barns and a mobile home were damaged.
EF0	Bethera	Berkeley	SC	33.1941°N 79.794°W	11:51–11:52	0.93 mi (1.50 km)	200 yd (180 m)	Multiple trees were snapped and uprooted while a tree limb was blown onto the roof of a house by this high-end EF0 tornado. This was the eighth of 12 tornadoes in a tornado family that traveled from near Newington, Georgia to Murrells Inlet, South Carolina.
EF1	SE of Jamestown	Berkeley	SC	33.2532°N 79.6559°W	12:00–12:02	2.5 mi (4.0 km)	400 yd (370 m)	Many trees were snapped or uprooted, and one home sustained roof damage. This was the ninth of 12 tornadoes in a tornado family that traveled from near Newington, Georgia to Murrells Inlet, South Carolina.
EF1	SE of Whiteville	Columbus	NC	34.2306°N 78.6360°W	12:10–12:12	0.58 mi (0.93 km)	100 yd (91 m)	Extensive tree damage occurred, and several agricultural sheds were destroyed.
EF1	N of Seabrook	Liberty, Bryan	GA	31.7592°N 81.3658°W	12:11–12:22	8.89 mi (14.31 km)	250 yd (230 m)	A few homes and a church sustained roof damage. Trees were snapped or uprooted along the path.
EF1	SW of Sampit to Spring Gully	Georgetown	SC	33.3542°N 79.4727°W	12:13–12:19	4.76 mi (7.66 km)	40 yd (37 m)	Twin tornadoes developed with this one touching down first. It damaged a double-wide office trailer, a metal storage building, a few mobile homes, power lines, and trees in and around the community of Sampit. Some railroad crossing barriers were snapped as well. This was the 10th of 12 tornadoes in a tornado family that traveled from near Newington, Georgia to Murrells Inlet, South Carolina.
EF1	Cumberland to N of Kensington	Georgetown	SC	33.3471°N 79.4494°W	12:15–12:27	11 mi (18 km)	50 yd (46 m)	Twin tornadoes developed with this one touching down second. It tracked across swampy terrain and damaged numerous trees. Near Graves two homes and several cars were damaged. A wooden carport and shed were destroyed, and some power poles were downed. This was the 11th of 12 tornadoes in a tornado family that traveled from near Newington, Georgia to Murrells Inlet, South Carolina.
EF2	Edisto Beach	Colleton	SC	32.4852°N 80.343°W	12:15–12:16	1.16 mi (1.87 km)	140 yd (130 m)	A strong waterspout moved onshore at Edisto Island and caused extensive roof damage to six homes in Edisto Beach. One home had most of its roof removed and an outer wall collapsed. Power lines were knocked down, a boat and several vehicles were damaged, and a trailer was flipped over as well. Numerous trees were snapped or uprooted along the path.
EF1	Seabrook Island	Charleston	SC	32.5653°N 80.1811°W	12:28–12:29	1.25 mi (2.01 km)	120 yd (110 m)	A short-lived tornado snapped or uprooted numerous trees. Several homes sustained varying degrees of damage from fallen trees.
EF1	SW of Kiawah Island	Charleston	SC	32.5969°N 80.1134°W	12:33–12:34	0.3 mi (0.48 km)	60 yd (55 m)	Several large trees were snapped at a golf course.
EF2	North Litchfield Beach to SE of Murrells Inlet	Georgetown	SC	33.4908°N 79.0906°W	12:36–12:47	4.56 mi (7.34 km)	50 yd (46 m)	A tornado caused extensive damage to trees along its path. At Huntington Beach State Park, one building suffered minor roof damage. As it moved offshore over the Atlantic Ocean southeast of Murrells Inlet, a Weather station observed winds of 114 mph (183 km/h), which was the basis for the low-end EF2 rating as the maximum damage on land was rated EF1 This was the last of the 12 tornadoes in a tornado family that started near Newington, Georgia.
EF1	SE of Currie to S of Burgaw	Pender	NC	34.4017°N 78.0595°W	13:09–13:15	7.82 mi (12.59 km)	50 yd (46 m)	A tornado snapped numerous large trees and damaged or destroyed multiple outbuildings. Four power poles were snapped, a fire station building sustained minor damage, and a home adjacent to the fire station had its garage door blown in. Near the end of the path, a well-built, large metal outbuilding had its roof ripped off and thrown 50 yd (46 m).
EF1	WNW of Rocky Point	Pender	NC	34.4315°N 77.9833°W	13:13–13:23	2.82 mi (4.54 km)	50 yd (46 m)	A power pole and several large trees were snapped. A few homes sustained minor roof damage as well.
EF1	E of St. Helena	Pender	NC	34.5009°N 77.8675°W	13:19–13:30	2.84 mi (4.57 km)	30 yd (27 m)	Several trees were snapped. A large shed was destroyed, and the front porch of a home was uplifted.
EF0	S of Maple Hill	Pender	NC	34.5543°N 77.7547°W	13:24–13:30	1.49 mi (2.40 km)	30 yd (27 m)	A few small trees were snapped, and some tree limbs were broken as well.
EF0	Oak Island	Brunswick	NC	33.9145°N 78.1659°W	13:32–13:34	0.08 mi (0.13 km)	15 yd (14 m)	A waterspout moved onshore over Oak Island and caused minor damage to roofs, siding, and trees.
EF0	N of Yaupon Beach	Brunswick	NC	33.9053°N 78.0799°W	13:36–13:38	0.42 mi (0.68 km)	15 yd (14 m)	Several trees were snapped or twisted and a fence was toppled.
EF1	Haws Run	Onslow	NC	34.6835°N 77.5726°W	13:36–13:41	5.5 mi (8.9 km)	640 yd (590 m)	An intermittent high-end EF1 tornado touched down in the Haws Run community and snapped, uprooted, and twisted numerous mature trees. Hog houses were completely destroyed, with many sections of the metal roofing and insulation thrown several miles away from the farm.
EF0	Maysville	Jones	NC	34.904°N 77.2378°W	14:01–14:02	0.7 mi (1.1 km)	75 yd (69 m)	A brief tornado caused predominantly minor damage to trees in town, though a few large trees were downed.
EF0	E of Roper	Washington	NC	35.8866°N 76.5537°W	14:05–14:06	0.35 mi (0.56 km)	25 yd (23 m)	A brief tornado destroyed a metal hog farm structure, lofting debris up to 0.4 mi (0.64 km) away.
EF0	SE of Pollocksville	Jones	NC	34.9586°N 77.1532°W	14:08–14:09	0.08 mi (0.13 km)	60 yd (55 m)	A brief tornado snapped 10–15 trees.
EF0	Northern Live Oak	Suwannee	FL	30.31°N 83.01°W	14:09–14:13	3.06 mi (4.92 km)	175 yd (160 m)	A weak tornado moved through the north side of Live Oak, downing trees and tree limbs and damaging a few metal buildings. A Walmart sustained minor damage at the end of the path.
EF0	Bayview	Beaufort	NC	35.4346°N 76.7884°W	14:15–14:16	0.31 mi (0.50 km)	29 yd (27 m)	A waterspout moved onshore from the Pamlico River into Bayview, damaging a pier in the process. Several trees were snapped or uprooted, with one home sustained some damage from flying debris.
EF0	Havelock	Craven	NC	34.8988°N 76.9273°W	14:20–14:21	0.27 mi (0.43 km)	75 yd (69 m)	A brief tornado caused minor roof and carport damage to several homes in town, and damaged fences and trees.
EF1	Frizzellburg	Carroll	MD	39.6087°N 77.0850°W	17:47–17:48	0.38 mi (0.61 km)	75 yd (69 m)	A brief tornado caused minor roofing damage to homes in Frizzellburg, shifted a garage, and tossed an RV a few feet. Several trees were snapped or uprooted as well.
EF0	Baltimore Corner to Henderson	Caroline	MD	39.0642°N 75.8548°W	19:27–19:28	4.85 mi (7.81 km)	30 yd (27 m)	Numerous trees were snapped or uprooted along a sporadic path.

=== April 15 event ===
List of confirmed tornadoes – Wednesday, April 15, 2020
EF#	Location	County / Parish	State	Start Coord.	Time (UTC)	Path length	Max width
EF0	Northern Jacksonville to Amelia Island	Duval, Nassau	FL	30.4415°N 81.6724°W	11:17–11:47	14.86 mi (23.91 km)	125 yd (114 m)
EF0	A weak tornado moved through the northern portions of Jacksonville along an intermittent path, causing primarily tree damage.						

=== April 17 event ===
List of confirmed tornadoes – Friday, April 17, 2020
EF#	Location	County / Parish	State	Start Coord.	Time (UTC)	Path length	Max width
EF0	Hypoluxo	Palm Beach	FL	26.5576°N 80.0616°W	02:53–02:55	0.83 mi (1.34 km)	75 yd (69 m)
EF0	Multiple tree limbs were downed. Minor damage occurred to home roofs and fences.						

=== April 19 event ===
List of confirmed tornadoes – Sunday, April 19, 2020 (Note: All dates are based on the local time zone where the tornado touched down; however, all times are in Coordinated Universal Time for consistency.)
EF#	Location	County / Parish	State	Start Coord.	Time (UTC)	Path length	Max width	Summary
EF1	NNE of Dry Prong to SW of Georgetown	Grant	LA	31.6611°N 92.4865°W	19:17–19:21	2.21 mi (3.56 km)	500 yd (460 m)	Numerous trees were snapped or uprooted.
EF1	N of Leesville	Vernon	LA	31.1666°N 93.3313°W	21:50–21:57	5.34 mi (8.59 km)	500 yd (460 m)	A tornado snapped, uprooted, or downed numerous trees and power lines. Some of the trees fell on homes and vehicles.
EF4	ESE of Tylertown to N of Sandy Hook to NW of New Augusta	Walthall, Marion, Lamar, Forrest, Perry	MS	31.0707°N 89.9646°W	00:09–01:19	53.76 mi (86.52 km)	2,275 yd (2,080 m)	1 death – See section on this tornado – One person was injured.
EF1	E of McNeil	Pearl River	MS	30.6783°N 89.5729°W	02:51–02:58	3.12 mi (5.02 km)	200 yd (180 m)	Numerous trees were snapped or uprooted. A chicken coop was damaged and a house had a portion of its roof torn off.
EF1	Mandeville	St. Tammany	LA	30.3684°N 90.0845°W	03:13–03:17	3.05 mi (4.91 km)	300 yd (270 m)	Numerous trees were snapped or uprooted in town, some of which fell on homes and vehicles. A small building at Mandeville Elementary School had its tin roof peeled off.
EF2	NE of Andalusia to NW of Babbie	Covington	AL	31.3479°N 86.3955°W	03:49–03:52	4.88 mi (7.85 km)	740 yd (680 m)	A poorly anchored duplex was pushed off its foundation and largely destroyed, with debris strewn 75 yd (69 m) away. A nearby concrete block workshop and storage unit were also destroyed. A house had large portions of its roof ripped off and partial exterior wall failure, and also had its doors and windows blown in. A metal garage building was heavily damaged, and had a large storage trailer thrown into it. Four large chicken houses were completely destroyed, and some semi-trailers were overturned. Numerous large trees were snapped along the path, some of which landed on a house. One person was injured. In November 2023, this tornado was reanalyzed and had its starting point adjusted further northwest based on widespread tree deforestation noted on Planet satellite imagery. The ending point was also extended further east due to tree damage.
EF1	W of Mobile Regional Airport	Mobile	AL	30.7092°N 88.3781°W	03:55–04:06	8.9 mi (14.3 km)	100 yd (91 m)	Many homes sustained damage to their roofs, siding, gutters, chimneys, and porches. Numerous fences were blown down, and numerous trees were snapped or uprooted.
EF0	NE of Elba	Coffee	AL	31.543°N 85.974°W	04:03–04:07	4.4 mi (7.1 km)	50 yd (46 m)	Numerous trees were snapped, and roofs were damaged.
EF1	W of Dees	Mobile	AL	30.5771°N 88.3973°W	04:05–04:07	1.3 mi (2.1 km)	75 yd (69 m)	Four barns were destroyed, three empty semi trailers and an irrigation watering system were overturned, and numerous trees were snapped. A large metal building had one door blown in while a second door was blown out.
EF1	SE of Mobile Regional Airport to N of Tillmans Corner	Mobile	AL	30.6684°N 88.2154°W	04:06–04:12	3.17 mi (5.10 km)	75 yd (69 m)	Several trees were snapped or uprooted, with some homes damaged by fallen trees and limbs, and fences were blown down as this tornado moved through Western Mobile.
EF1	Ozark to NW of Haleburg	Dale, Henry	AL	31.46°N 85.63°W	04:20–04:45	24.37 mi (39.22 km)	150 yd (140 m)	This tornado mainly snapped and uprooted trees along its path. In Ozark, it ripped the brick facade from the side of a doctor's office, and it also tore siding from a business. The tornado crossed from Dale County into Henry County, severely damaging several small barns, farm buildings, and silos. Minor roof damage was inflicted to several homes. The tornado dissipated as two other nearby tornadoes became the dominant circulations within the storm.
EF0	NE of Oak Grove	Geneva	AL	31.1°N 85.78°W	04:32–04:35	1.82 mi (2.93 km)	100 yd (91 m)	Some trees were damaged.
EF2	Tumbleton	Henry	AL	31.3994°N 85.2790°W	04:40–04:47	5.18 mi (8.34 km)	300 yd (270 m)	1 death – See section on this tornado.
EF1	Southwestern Dothan	Houston	AL	31.21°N 85.46°W	04:42–04:44	0.71 mi (1.14 km)	50 yd (46 m)	A brief tornado struck the southwestern outskirts of Dothan, causing roof damage to nine homes and a storage facility. Trees were downed as well.
EF1	E of Balkum	Henry	AL	31.4007°N 85.2142°W	04:45–04:48	1.49 mi (2.40 km)	500 yd (460 m)	An automotive shop was destroyed, and a home had an exterior wall ripped off by this high-end EF1 tornado. Another home and a mobile home sustained roof damage, and several trees were downed. The tornado occurred simultaneously with the three other Henry County tornadoes.
EF1	NE of Robertsdale	Baldwin	AL	30.5903°N 87.5818°W	04:46–04:47	0.47 mi (0.76 km)	300 yd (270 m)	Numerous large trees were snapped. A couple of mobile homes sustained roof, siding, and skirting damage, and an RV camper was lifted and demolished. One person was injured.
EF1	NW of Haleburg	Henry	AL	31.4455°N 85.2619°W	04:46–04:50	6.45 mi (10.38 km)	100 yd (91 m)	The roof of a double-wide manufactured home was damaged; otherwise, damage was limited to snapped or uprooted trees. This tornado occurred simultaneously with the Tumbleton EF2 and Balkum EF1 tornadoes.

=== April 20 event ===
List of confirmed tornadoes – Monday, April 20, 2020
EF#	Location	County / Parish	State	Start Coord.	Time (UTC)	Path length	Max width	Summary
EF0	WNW of Pace	Santa Rosa	FL	30.6079°N 87.187°W	05:07–05:08	0.19 mi (0.31 km)	50 yd (46 m)	A brief tornado embedded within straight line winds downed several trees.
EF2	NW of Bridgeboro to SE of Gordy	Mitchell, Worth	GA	31.42°N 84.00°W	06:10–06:14	8.72 mi (14.03 km)	500 yd (460 m)	Two homes suffered extensive roof and siding damage, and a third sustained roof loss and some collapse of exterior walls. A mobile home also sustained roof damage, and an outbuilding was destroyed.
EF0	W of Homosassa to Homosassa Springs	Citrus	FL	28.79°N 82.69°W	13:39–13:48	7.25 mi (11.67 km)	35 yd (32 m)	A waterspout moved onshore, inflicting major damage to two mobile homes and minor damage to seven others. Several trees were downed in the Homosassa Springs Wildlife Park, power poles were snapped, and a billboard was toppled. The canopy of a gas station was blown off, while one business sustained considerable damage.
EF1	SE of Ocala	Marion	FL	29.00°N 82.17°W	13:40–13:55	12.5 mi (20.1 km)	500 yd (460 m)	A tornado tossed a stationary construction trailer across Interstate 75 and caused severe damage to two homes just northeast of the interstate. It then snapped numerous trees, and caused mainly minor roof and window damage along an intermittent path.
EF0	Lake Jesup	Seminole	FL	28.7186°N 81.2418°W	15:45–15:48	2.74 mi (4.41 km)	25 yd (23 m)	A tornadic waterspout moved across Lake Jesup to the east of Winter Springs. No damage occurred.

=== April 21 event ===
List of confirmed tornadoes – Tuesday, April 21, 2020
EF#	Location	County / Parish	State	Start Coord.	Time (UTC)	Path length	Max width
EF0	Normandy Beach	Ocean	NJ	40.0003°N 74.0667°W	19:05–19:06	0.41 mi (0.66 km)	20 yd (18 m)
EF0	A waterspout moved ashore and tossed or flipped several boats and associated trailers. At least one home sustained minor damage.						
EF1	SE of Sterling	Comanche, Grady	OK	34.711°N 98.091°W	04:28–04:30	0.29 mi (0.47 km)	100 yd (91 m)
EF1	A mobile home was heavily damaged.						
EF1	Northern Marlow	Stephens	OK	34.668°N 97.974°W	04:43–04:46	1.6 mi (2.6 km)	100 yd (91 m)
EF1	A tornado impacted northern sections of Marlow, severely damaging several buildings on a farm, including a home and an outbuilding that had most of their roofs ripped off. Large trees were broken or damaged, and utility poles were snapped as well.						

=== April 22 event ===
List of confirmed tornadoes – Wednesday, April 22, 2020
EF#	Location	County / Parish	State	Start Coord.	Time (UTC)	Path length	Max width	Summary
EF1	SW of Pauls Valley	Garvin	OK	34.672°N 97.283°W	21:17–21:22	2.2 mi (3.5 km)	600 yd (550 m)	Trees, power poles, a few outbuildings, and seven homes were damaged.
EF0	N of Springer	Carter	OK	34.331°N 97.141°W	21:23	0.1 mi (0.16 km)	20 yd (18 m)	A very brief tornado lofted some debris.
EF2	NE of Springer	Carter, Murray	OK	34.3385°N 97.126°W	21:24–21:37	4.73 mi (7.61 km)	600 yd (550 m)	A strong tornado moved through an unpopulated wooded area, causing significant tree damage.
EFU	SW of Madill	Marshall	OK	34.0491°N 96.8194°W	21:45	0.2 mi (0.32 km)	50 yd (46 m)	A brief tornado touched down, causing no damage.
EF2	SSW of Oakland to SE of Madill	Marshall	OK	34.0705°N 96.813°W	21:53–22:05	4.25 mi (6.84 km)	400 yd (370 m)	2 deaths – This high-end EF2 tornado, which was videoed by numerous storm chasers and broadcast live on The Weather Channel, moved through the southern part of Madill. Three factories or warehouses–Oklahoma Steel & Wire, Mid American Steel & Wire, and M & R Wire Works–sustained significant damage, and a catholic church sustained considerable roof and window damage. Several site-built homes sustained roof damage, and one had its roof removed entirely. Multiple mobile homes, barns, and outbuildings were destroyed, several vehicles were damaged or thrown, and a satellite dish was ripped off a 310-foot guyed radio tower. Many wooden and steel power poles were snapped or knocked down, and many trees were downed along the path as well. At least 30 people were injured.
EF0	SW of Little City	Marshall	OK	34.0665°N 96.641°W	22:10–22:14	1.4 mi (2.3 km)	50 yd (46 m)	A power pole and some trees were damaged.
EF1	N of Wapanucka	Johnston	OK	34.39°N 96.504°W	22:26–22:38	5 mi (8.0 km)	100 yd (91 m)	Trees and roofs sustained damage, and an RV camper was overturned.
EF1	N of Armstrong	Bryan	OK	34.0665°N 96.392°W	22:32–22:45	5.21 mi (8.38 km)	500 yd (460 m)	A number of homes, barns, and trees were damaged by this multiple-vortex tornado. Power poles were downed as well.
EF1	E of Armstrong	Bryan	OK	34.068°N 96.221°W	22:52–22:53	1.2 mi (1.9 km)	30 yd (27 m)	A number of tree branches were broken, and a building was damaged.
EF3	NW of Onalaska to WSW of Chester	Trinity, Polk	TX	30.8409°N 95.1824°W	22:35–23:15	28.51 mi (45.88 km)	1,100 yd (1,000 m)	3 deaths – See section on this tornado – 33 people were injured.
EF0	SW of Lehigh	Coal	OK	34.42°N 96.3°W	22:59	0.1 mi (0.16 km)	30 yd (27 m)	Two separate storm chasers videoed a tornado; it caused no damage.
EF1	N of Toco	Lamar	TX	33.8089°N 95.7308°W	23:35–23:42	4.45 mi (7.16 km)	510 yd (470 m)	A few outbuildings were damaged or destroyed near the community of Direct. Trees were also damaged.
EF2	ENE of Powderly	Lamar, Red River	TX	33.8169°N 95.4799°W	23:51–00:05	10.4 mi (16.7 km)	810 yd (740 m)	Numerous large trees were snapped or uprooted, and a handful of homes sustained relatively minor roof damage.
EF2	E of Jasper, TX to N of Rosepine, LA	Jasper (TX), Newton (TX), Vernon (LA)	TX, LA	30.9325°N 93.8965°W	00:28–01:19	36.42 mi (58.61 km)	600 yd (550 m)	A long-tracked, strong tornado produced by the same supercell as the Onalaska EF3 tornado damaged roofs and trees. Severe tree damage occurred in some areas, including a few trees that sustained some debarking.
EF2	Elmer	Rapides	LA	31.1285°N 92.6814°W	02:09–02:27	8.43 mi (13.57 km)	500 yd (460 m)	A few homes and power poles were damaged, and many trees were snapped in and around Elmer. Some trees sustained debarking.
EF2	S of Alexandria	Rapides	LA	31.1623°N 92.4582°W	02:26–02:38	8.98 mi (14.45 km)	550 yd (500 m)	1 death – Two mobile homes were demolished, resulting in one fatality. Numerous houses and trees were damaged, and numerous power poles were toppled. Substantial damage was inflicted to a livestock facility, and severe damage was also inflicted to farm and equipment buildings at the LSU-Alexandria Dean Lee Research Station.
EF1	Lamourie	Rapides	LA	31.1222°N 92.4355°W	02:27–02:34	3.85 mi (6.20 km)	500 yd (460 m)	Outbuildings and sheds were damaged, power lines were snapped, and shingles were ripped off a roof.
EF1	N of Ruby to NW of Effie	Rapides, Avoyelles	LA	31.2166°N 92.2562°W	02:42–02:53	5.36 mi (8.63 km)	200 yd (180 m)	A tornado caused considerable tree damage, some of which damaged a few homes upon falling.
EF1	NE of Marksville	Catahoula, Avoyelles	LA	31.2412°N 91.9671°W	03:06–03:18	7.61 mi (12.25 km)	1,200 yd (1,100 m)	Trees and mobile homes were damaged.
EF1	NW of Acme	Catahoula, Concordia	LA	31.2927°N 91.8805°W	03:17–03:25	4.01 mi (6.45 km)	880 yd (800 m)	Numerous trees were snapped, and a mobile home lost sections of its roof, siding, and metal awning.

=== April 23 event ===
List of confirmed tornadoes – Thursday, April 23, 2020
EF#	Location	County / Parish	State	Start Coord.	Time (UTC)	Path length	Max width	Summary
EF2	WNW of Bunkie	Avoyelles	LA	30.9483°N 92.2519°W	06:08–06:14	3.62 mi (5.83 km)	100 yd (91 m)	Substantial damage was inflicted to hangars and aircraft at the Bunkie Airport. Trees were damaged as well.
EF1	NE of Evergreen	Avoyelles	LA	30.9677°N 92.1011°W	06:20–06:23	1.13 mi (1.82 km)	100 yd (91 m)	Homes and outbuildings were damaged.
EF1	S of Eunice	Acadia	LA	30.3997°N 92.4418°W	06:51–07:01	9.53 mi (15.34 km)	150 yd (140 m)	Trees, power lines, and a large shed were damaged.
EF0	NNE of Florence to SE of Brandon	Rankin	MS	32.1744°N 90.1136°W	06:57–07:17	11.43 mi (18.39 km)	1,230 yd (1,120 m)	Numerous trees were snapped or uprooted.
EF2	NE of Liberty to N of McComb	Amite, Pike	MS	31.2047°N 90.7432°W	08:07–08:28	18.3 mi (29.5 km)	1,760 yd (1,610 m)	A house had most of its roof torn off, and a large metal building was destroyed by this large, strong tornado. Numerous trees were snapped or uprooted along the path.
EF0	NE of Salem	Marion	MS	31.318°N 90.037°W	08:57–09:04	6.49 mi (10.44 km)	200 yd (180 m)	Several trees were snapped or uprooted, including several that fell on a home.
EF2	ENE of Soso to W of Eucutta	Jones	MS	31.7608°N 89.2247°W	09:14–09:30	16.85 mi (27.12 km)	2,640 yd (2,410 m)	A 1.5-mile (2.4 km) wide tornado developed just east of the path of an EF4 tornado 11 days prior. Moving north of Laurel, the tornado completely destroyed half of a chicken house and mowed down hundreds of trees, many of which fell on homes and caused severe damage. Numerous power lines were downed as well.
EF1	NW of Waynesboro	Wayne	MS	31.8116°N 88.8782°W	09:33–09:35	1.8 mi (2.9 km)	350 yd (320 m)	Damage was confined to trees that were snapped or uprooted.
EF1	N of Lucedale	George	MS	30.9349°N 88.6208°W	11:17–11:19	2.26 mi (3.64 km)	200 yd (180 m)	A few homes sustained minor roof damage. Otherwise, additional homes were damaged by some trees that were snapped or uprooted.
EF1	ENE of Lucedale	George	MS	30.9381°N 88.5195°W	11:23–11:24	0.38 mi (0.61 km)	50 yd (46 m)	The roof of a mobile home was ripped off, causing its walls to collapse. Several trees were snapped or uprooted.
EF1	E of Lucedale	George	MS	30.9322°N 88.5243°W	11:24–11:25	1.45 mi (2.33 km)	250 yd (230 m)	Numerous trees were snapped or uprooted, some of which were downed onto homes. A few houses and a church sustained roof and shingle damage. A travel trailer was flipped, injuring one person.
EF1	NW of Chunchula	Mobile	AL	30.9642°N 88.3089°W	11:37–11:38	0.55 mi (0.89 km)	75 yd (69 m)	A tornado primarily damaged trees, but one fallen tree caused significant damage to a home. Another house had its garage door blown in, and a shed was heavily damaged.
EF0	NE of Falco	Covington	AL	31.063°N 86.5700°W	13:42–13:43	0.37 mi (0.60 km)	50 yd (46 m)	Several trees were snapped or uprooted.
EF0	NE of Florala	Covington	AL	31.0665°N 86.2524°W	13:53	0.01 mi (0.016 km)	25 yd (23 m)	A grain bin was damaged by this brief tornado.
EF1	E of Pelham	Mitchell	GA	31.1314°N 84.1624°W	16:05–16:10	2.4 mi (3.9 km)	176 yd (161 m)	A large portion of the metal roof was ripped off an auto service building, and a nearby van was flipped. The metal awning at a warehouse, an outbuilding, and the roof of a home were damaged. Numerous trees were snapped or uprooted.
EF1	S of Moultrie to E of Adel	Colquitt, Cook	GA	31.13°N 83.95°W	16:34–17:10	37.24 mi (59.93 km)	650 yd (590 m)	A long-tracked, high-end EF1 tornado caused significant damage to a warehouse and caused minor roof damage to a home. Several billboards and tall signs were damaged as it crossed I-75. In Adel, large sections of two warehouses were torn away. A large shed was severely damaged, and numerous trees were snapped or uprooted, some of which were snapped near their bases.
EF0	NNW of Dupont	Lanier, Clinch	GA	31.093°N 82.9832°W	17:28–17:34	2.24 mi (3.60 km)	50 yd (46 m)	Many trees were snapped and a home sustained roof damage.
EF0	Northern Waycross to Bonneyman	Ware, Pierce	GA	31.22°N 82.47°W	18:05–18:29	8.97 mi (14.44 km)	50 yd (46 m)	A large tree was snapped, causing severe damage to the roof and walls of a mobile home upon falling.
EF0	S of Waycross to WSW of Schlatterville	Ware	GA	31.17°N 82.35°W	18:15–18:24	7.49 mi (12.05 km)	unknown	A tornado snapped a large tree and it fell onto a mobile home causing severe damage to the roof and walls.
EF0	SE of Bladen	Glynn	GA	31.1892°N 81.6689°W	18:59–19:00	0.47 mi (0.76 km)	50 yd (46 m)	A brief tornado caused no known damage.
EF0	E of White Oak	Camden	GA	31.04°N 81.65°W	19:37–19:38	0.3 mi (0.48 km)	50 yd (46 m)	A brief tornado touched down over remote marshland, causing no known damage.
EF1	Northern Fort Walton Beach	Okaloosa	FL	30.4442°N 86.6463°W	19:51–19:54	2.7 mi (4.3 km)	50 yd (46 m)	Numerous trees were snapped or uprooted in the northern part of Fort Walton Beach. Homes sustained minor damage to their siding and roofs.
EF1	Defuniak Springs to WSW of Ponce De Leon	Walton, Holmes	FL	30.71°N 86.12°W	20:13–20:20	9.07 mi (14.60 km)	100 yd (91 m)	Four windows of a series of businesses at a strip mall were blown in. A large retail business had a portion of its roof peeled back and a few HVAC units tossed off. Numerous trees were snapped or uprooted, and business signs were downed.
EF0	SW of Bonifay	Washington	FL	30.7282°N 85.7412°W	20:33–20:36	2.68 mi (4.31 km)	100 yd (91 m)	Multiple trees were uprooted.
EF2	SW of Chipley to SW of Marianna	Washington, Jackson	FL	30.72°N 85.59°W	20:48–21:05	17.24 mi (27.75 km)	400 yd (370 m)	Hundreds of trees were snapped or uprooted. A two-story outbuilding was completely destroyed at a farm, with debris tossed several hundred yards away. Several mobile homes sustained significant damage, including one that was demolished and had its frame wrapped around a tree.
EF0	Panama City Beach	Bay	FL	30.18°N 85.81°W	21:00–21:13	13.4 mi (21.6 km)	75 yd (69 m)	A waterspout moved ashore in Panama City Beach, causing only minor damage there. Farther inland, several unsecured construction trailers and one camper trailer were destroyed.
EF0	N of Lynn Haven	Bay	FL	30.29°N 85.65°W	21:09–21:12	0.9 mi (1.4 km)	50 yd (46 m)	Tree limbs and power lines were damaged.
EF1	SW of Lake Jackson to Bradfordville	Leon	FL	30.52°N 84.35°W	22:22–22:38	10.58 mi (17.03 km)	600 yd (550 m)	This tornado moved through the north side of Tallahassee, snapping and uprooting numerous trees. One uprooted tree landed on a home.
EF1	NE of Wakulla Springs	Wakulla	FL	30.25°N 84.26°W	22:54–23:00	3.85 mi (6.20 km)	100 yd (91 m)	Trees were snapped or uprooted, at least one of which fell onto a home.
EF1	Keaton Beach	Taylor	FL	29.83°N 83.6°W	23:56–00:00	0.46 mi (0.74 km)	100 yd (91 m)	A tornadic waterspout moved ashore in Keaton Beach, ripping the concrete pilings out of the ground at a boat rental facility.
EF0	NW of Williford	Gilchrist	FL	29.84°N 82.87°W	01:11–01:12	0.6 mi (0.97 km)	50 yd (46 m)	A brief tornado touched down over an unpopulated area, causing no damage.

=== April 24 event ===
List of confirmed tornadoes – Friday, April 24, 2020
EF#	Location	County / Parish	State	Start Coord.	Time (UTC)	Path length	Max width
EF0	WNW of Norton	Saline	MO	39.21°N 93.31°W	19:08	0.02 mi (0.032 km)	50 yd (46 m)
EF0	A landspout tornado was photographed; it did not cause damage.						
EF2	Ivanhoe	Fannin	TX	33.7199°N 96.2085°W	23:40–23:56	7.94 mi (12.78 km)	425 yd (389 m)
EF2	One house had its roof ripped off, while a few others suffered lesser roof damage. A double-wide manufactured home was rolled and destroyed, injuring one occupant. A large metal shop and an outbuilding were damaged, and trees were also snapped along the path.						
EFU	N of Honey Grove	Fannin	TX	33.70°N 95.93°W	00:08–00:09	0.11 mi (0.18 km)	50 yd (46 m)
EFU	Trained storm spotters and storm chasers observed a tornado, but no damage occurred.						
EFU	NNE of Honey Grove	Fannin	TX	33.69°N 95.88°W	00:13–00:14	0.05 mi (0.080 km)	50 yd (46 m)
EFU	Trained storm spotters and storm chasers observed a tornado, but no damage occurred.						
EF1	N of Ozark	Franklin	AR	35.6489°N 93.8201°W	02:09–02:10	0.5 mi (0.80 km)	75 yd (69 m)
EF1	Trees were uprooted and limbs were snapped.						

=== April 25 event ===
List of reported tornadoes – Saturday, April 25, 2020
EF#	Location	County / Parish	State	Start Coord.	Time (UTC)	Path length	Max width
EF0	N of Mount Vernon	Posey	IN	37.9969°N 87.9351°W	18:25–18:26	0.37 mi (0.60 km)	40 yd (37 m)
EF0	A brief tornado was reported; it did not cause damage.						
EF1	ESE of Tuckers Crossroads	Wilson, Smith	TN	36.1659°N 86.1293°W	21:45–21:52	3.81 mi (6.13 km)	100 yd (91 m)
EF1	This tornado touched down several miles north of Watertown, causing roof and siding damage to two homes before crossing Interstate 40, where a tractor-trailer was overturned, causing a traffic accident involving other vehicles. More houses sustained roof damage, an outbuilding was destroyed, and a trampoline was tossed as the tornado continued into Smith County. Buildings at a cedar mill in Grant that had previously been impacted on March 3 were damaged before the tornado dissipated. Many trees were downed along the path. Three people were injured along the interstate in vehicles.						
EF2	Northern Greenville to SSE of Taylors	Greenville	SC	34.892°N 82.392°W	01:10–01:18	5.47 mi (8.80 km)	400 yd (370 m)
EF2	This tornado moved through the northern sections of Greenville, where the roof was ripped off a motel, with roofing material being thrown, destroying numerous vehicles. Much of the roof was removed from a restaurant, while a Sav-Mor grocery store and a church building were also damaged. Numerous trees were snapped or uprooted along the path, some of which landed on homes.						

=== April 28 event ===
List of reported tornadoes – Tuesday, April 28, 2020
EF#	Location	County / Parish	State	Start Coord.	Time (UTC)	Path length	Max width
EF0	Dawson	Sangamon	IL	39.8569°N 89.4962°W	23:56–00:01	2.1 mi (3.4 km)	100 yd (91 m)
EF0	Twelve homes sustained shingle, siding, or gutter damage.						
EF0	Oakville to Greenwood	Plaquemines	LA	29.7838°N 90.0088°W	01:52–01:55	1.4 mi (2.3 km)	150 yd (140 m)
EF0	A restaurant had some of its awning damaged, and an attached metal and tin structure was completely destroyed after being thrown 50 yd (46 m) into power lines, breaking a power pole as a result. Minor siding and fascia damage was inflicted to a two-story house, and a metal sign was twisted and bent. A double-wide manufactured home had some fascia removed and suffered minor damage to its screened-in porch. The bed of a pickup truck was impaled by a piece of wood, and a single-wide manufactured home had its metal roof and most of its siding removed. Other damage was inflicted to a carport, some sheds, and trees.						
EF1	S of Sardis Lake	Pushmataha	OK	34.6228°N 95.3822°W	02:02–02:19	5.2 mi (8.4 km)	550 yd (500 m)
EF1	Trees were snapped or uprooted, and power poles were blown down.						
EF1	N of Hochatown	McCurtain	OK	34.2965°N 94.7318°W	03:05–03:10	3.23 mi (5.20 km)	100 yd (91 m)
EF1	Numerous trees were snapped or uprooted, causing severe damage to several RVs and vehicles.						
EF2	E of Hochatown, OK to NW of Lockesburg, AR	McCurtain (OK), Sevier (AR)	OK, AR	34.1955°N 94.5133°W	03:20–03:40	19.38 mi (31.19 km)	350 yd (320 m)
EF2	A tornado touched down twice. Along its first path, two barges were tossed over 100 yd (91 m), a home's roof deck was collapsed, and a single-wide manufactured home was destroyed, with its base frame twisted and tossed 100 yd (91 m) to the east. A second house suffered significant roof and structural damage after large gas tanks were tossed into it. A third house had roofing material removed, and numerous trees were snapped or uprooted. The tornado touched down again in Sevier County, Arkansas, causing roof damage to a home's garage, two chicken houses, and a farm building. A single-wide manufactured home was rolled and destroyed. About 160 more trees were snapped or uprooted.						

=== April 29 event ===
List of reported tornadoes – Wednesday, April 29, 2020
EF#	Location	County / Parish	State	Start Coord.	Time (UTC)	Path length	Max width
EF0	SW of Sandy Springs	Anderson	SC	34.564°N 82.792°W	22:18–22:19	0.58 mi (0.93 km)	30 yd (27 m)
EF0	Several trees were snapped or uprooted.						
EF1	NNE of Grenta	Gadsden	FL	30.6577°N 84.622°W	23:34–23:36	0.96 mi (1.54 km)	150 yd (140 m)
EF1	Manufactured homes suffered roof, siding, and undercarriage damage. Trees were snapped or uprooted.						

== See also ==
- Tornadoes of 2020
- 2020 Easter tornado outbreak
- Tornado outbreak of April 22–23, 2020
- List of United States tornadoes from January to March 2020
- List of United States tornadoes from May to July 2020
