= Tornado outbreak of April 21–23, 2020 =

Weather event in the United States

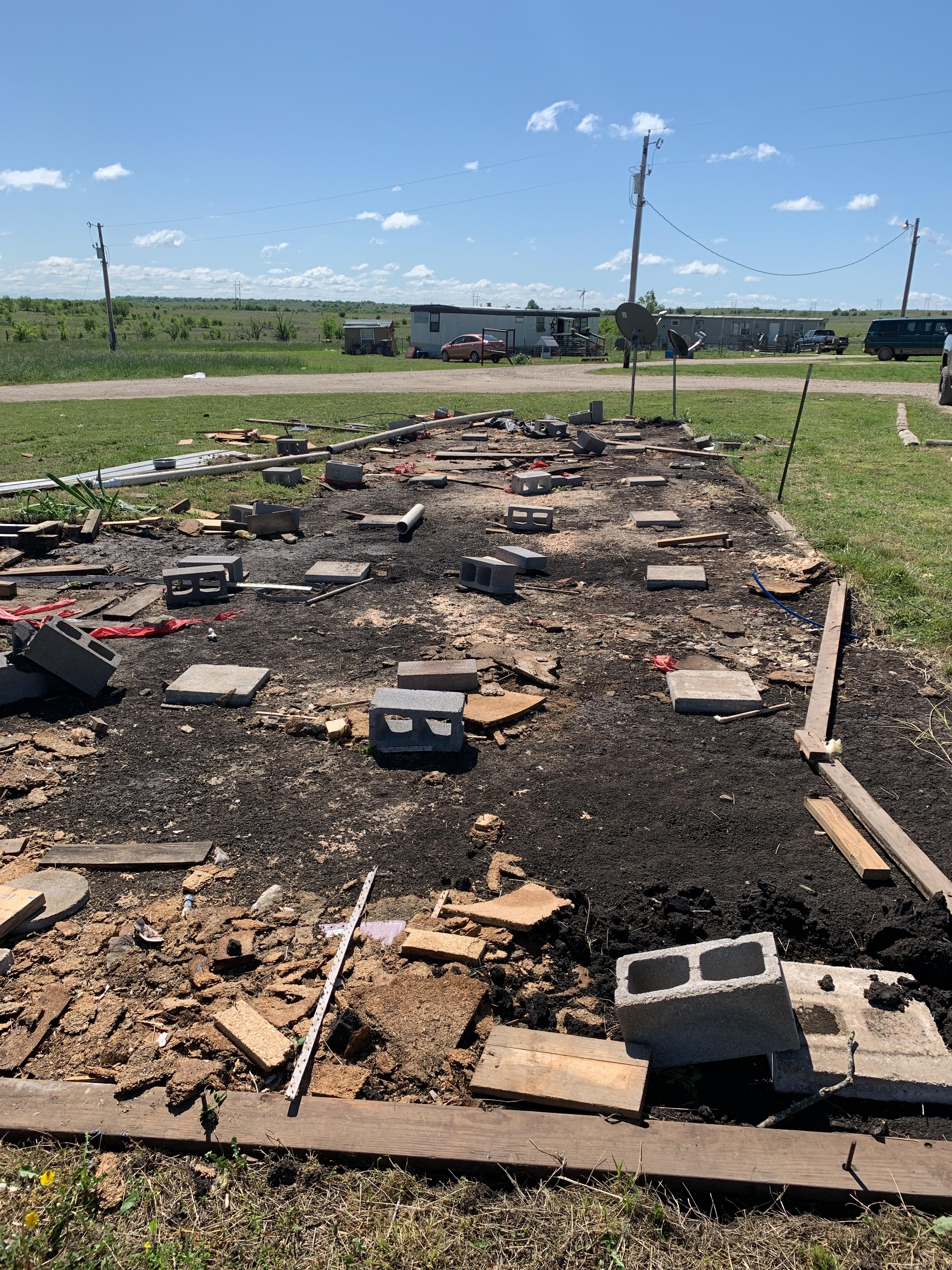
- EF2 damage to a mobile home in Madill, OK.

Meteorological history
- Duration: April 21–23, 2020

Tornado outbreak
- Tornadoes: 53
- Max. rating: EF3 tornado
- Highest winds: 140 mph (230 km/h) in Onalaska, Texas
- Largest hail: 2.75 in (7.0 cm) in Nida, Oklahoma, on April 22

Overall effects
- Fatalities: 6 (+1 non-tornadic)
- Injuries: 64 injuries
- Damage: $1.1 billion (2020 USD)
- Areas affected: Oklahoma, Texas, Arkansas, Louisiana, Mississippi, Alabama, Florida, and Georgia
- Part of the tornado outbreaks of 2020

On April 22, 2020, an outbreak of discrete supercell thunderstorms across portions of Oklahoma, Texas, and Louisiana led to widespread severe weather, including multiple strong tornadoes. Two people were killed by a high-end EF2 that struck the town of Madill, Oklahoma, and three more were killed by an EF3 wedge tornado that moved through Onalaska, Texas. Dozens of others were injured as well. The event came to fruition as a trough progressed eastward across the United States, interacting with a moist and unstable environment. Tornado activity continued into Arkansas, Louisiana, Mississippi, Alabama, Florida, and Georgia overnight into the day on April 23. Isolated tornado activity also occurred during the overnight hours on April 21.

== Meteorological synopsis ==
On April 19, the Storm Prediction Center outlined portions of the U.S. Southern Plains with a 15% area of severe weather within 25 miles of any point. A Slight risk was maintained across much of the same areas in the subsequent day 3 outlook, but parts of southeastern Oklahoma, much of northeastern Texas, southwestern Arkansas, and northwestern Louisiana were upgraded to an Enhanced risk on April 21. This risk area was maintained in the lead-up to the event on April 22. Confidence in organized severe weather came as a southwest-to-northeast oriented trough moved eastward across the United States, interacting with a corridor of low-level moisture and instability ahead of this feature. Throughout the early morning hours of April 22, discrete thunderstorms posing a risk for damaging winds and hail developed across Oklahoma, north of an approaching warm front. Farther south across central Texas and into western Louisiana, elevated convection began to increase in the presence of strong wind shear, with the expectation that those storms would become surface based with time as they progressed into a region of modest daytime heating.

Isolated tornadic activity was observed in Oklahoma during the overnight hours of April 21. By mid-afternoon the next day, a low-pressure area progressed into southwestern Oklahoma, supporting a quasi-stationary front across southern Oklahoma and a sharpening dry line southward into central Texas. The combination of partially sunny skies and dew points in the upper 60s Fahrenheit led to a very unstable environment across northwestern Texas and into southwestern Oklahoma. Thunderstorm activity soon developed in the vicinity of the area of low pressure, but the highest risk of tornadic activity was expected to materialize farther east where the direction of surface winds would be more conducive to rotating storms. As the storms tracked eastward, multiple damaging tornadoes were reported. Farther south across eastern Texas and western Louisiana, a subtle warm front and an additional surface boundary proved to be the impetus for convection to develop supercell characteristics. One such supercell in Walker and Houston counties further organized as it curved right into an undisturbed environment of high wind shear and moisture. Within the hour, it spawned an intense, long-tracked tornado with winds of 130–165 mph (209–266 km/h) as estimated by the SPC based on historical analogs. This long-tracked cell maintained prominence and spawned additional tornadoes for several hours as it continued through Louisiana and into Western Mississippi. On its trail, additional storms in a moderately unstable, highly sheared environment continued to pose a threat for all hazards. Severe weather from this group of storms continued throughout the overnight hours along the Gulf Coast, with large swath of wind damage and tornadoes continuing into April 23. More storms fired up just offshore of the Florida panhandle as the first band moved off the coast around mid-day. These storms produced more tornadoes and wind damage before weakening that night.

== Confirmed tornadoes ==
Confirmed tornadoes by Enhanced Fujita rating
EFU	EF0	EF1	EF2	EF3	EF4	EF5	Total
1	16	25	10	1	0	0	53

=== April 21 event ===
List of confirmed tornadoes – Tuesday, April 21, 2020 (Note: All dates are based on the local time zone where the tornado touched down; however, all times are in Coordinated Universal Time for consistency.)
EF#	Location	County / Parish	State	Start Coord.	Time (UTC)	Path length	Max width
EF1	SE of Sterling	Comanche, Grady	OK	34.711°N 98.091°W	04:28–04:30	0.29 mi (0.47 km)	100 yd (91 m)
EF1	A mobile home was heavily damaged.						
EF1	Northern Marlow	Stephens	OK	34.668°N 97.974°W	04:43–04:46	1.6 mi (2.6 km)	100 yd (91 m)
EF1	A tornado impacted northern sections of Marlow, severely damaging several buildings on a farm, including a home and an outbuilding that had most of their roofs ripped off. Large trees were broken or damaged, and utility poles were snapped as well.						

=== April 22 event ===
List of confirmed tornadoes – Wednesday, April 22, 2020
EF#	Location	County / Parish	State	Start Coord.	Time (UTC)	Path length	Max width
EF1	SW of Pauls Valley	Garvin	OK	34.672°N 97.283°W	21:17–21:22	2.2 mi (3.5 km)	600 yd (550 m)
EF1	Trees, power poles, a few outbuildings, and seven homes were damaged.						
EF0	N of Springer	Carter	OK	34.331°N 97.141°W	21:23	0.1 mi (0.16 km)	20 yd (18 m)
EF0	A very brief tornado lofted some debris.						
EF2	NE of Springer	Carter, Murray	OK	34.3385°N 97.126°W	21:24–21:37	4.73 mi (7.61 km)	600 yd (550 m)
EF2	A strong tornado moved through an unpopulated wooded area, causing significant tree damage.						
EFU	SW of Madill	Marshall	OK	34.0491°N 96.8194°W	21:45	0.2 mi (0.32 km)	50 yd (46 m)
EFU	A brief tornado touched down, causing no damage.						
EF2	SSW of Oakland to SE of Madill	Marshall	OK	34.0705°N 96.813°W	21:53–22:05	4.25 mi (6.84 km)	400 yd (370 m)
EF2	2 deaths – This high-end EF2 tornado, which was videoed by numerous storm chasers and broadcast live on The Weather Channel, moved through the southern part of Madill. Three factories or warehouses–Oklahoma Steel & Wire, Mid American Steel & Wire, and M & R Wire Works–sustained significant damage, and a catholic church sustained considerable roof and window damage. Several site-built homes sustained roof damage, and one had its roof removed entirely. Multiple mobile homes, barns, and outbuildings were destroyed, several vehicles were damaged or thrown, and a satellite dish was ripped off a 310-foot guyed radio tower. Many wooden and steel power poles were snapped or knocked down, and many trees were downed along the path as well. At least 30 people were injured.						
EF0	SW of Little City	Marshall	OK	34.0665°N 96.641°W	22:10–22:14	1.4 mi (2.3 km)	50 yd (46 m)
EF0	A power pole and some trees were damaged.						
EF1	N of Wapanucka	Johnston	OK	34.39°N 96.504°W	22:26–22:38	5 mi (8.0 km)	100 yd (91 m)
EF1	Trees and roofs sustained damage, and an RV camper was overturned.						
EF1	N of Armstrong	Bryan	OK	34.0665°N 96.392°W	22:32–22:45	5.21 mi (8.38 km)	500 yd (460 m)
EF1	A number of homes, barns, and trees were damaged by this multiple-vortex tornado. Power poles were downed as well.						
EF1	E of Armstrong	Bryan	OK	34.068°N 96.221°W	22:52–22:53	1.2 mi (1.9 km)	30 yd (27 m)
EF1	A number of tree branches were broken, and a building was damaged.						
EF3	NW of Onalaska to WSW of Chester	Trinity, Polk	TX	30.8409°N 95.1824°W	22:35–23:15	28.51 mi (45.88 km)	1,100 yd (1,000 m)
EF3	3 deaths – See section on this tornado – 33 people were injured.						
EF0	SW of Lehigh	Coal	OK	34.42°N 96.3°W	22:59	0.1 mi (0.16 km)	30 yd (27 m)
EF0	Two separate storm chasers videoed a tornado; it caused no damage.						
EF1	N of Toco	Lamar	TX	33.8089°N 95.7308°W	23:35–23:42	4.45 mi (7.16 km)	510 yd (470 m)
EF1	A few outbuildings were damaged or destroyed near the community of Direct. Trees were also damaged.						
EF2	ENE of Powderly	Lamar, Red River	TX	33.8169°N 95.4799°W	23:51–00:05	10.4 mi (16.7 km)	810 yd (740 m)
EF2	Numerous large trees were snapped or uprooted, and a handful of homes sustained relatively minor roof damage.						
EF2	E of Jasper, TX to N of Rosepine, LA	Jasper (TX), Newton (TX), Vernon (LA)	TX, LA	30.9325°N 93.8965°W	00:28–01:19	36.42 mi (58.61 km)	600 yd (550 m)
EF2	A long-tracked, strong tornado produced by the same supercell as the Onalaska EF3 tornado damaged roofs and trees. Severe tree damage occurred in some areas, including a few trees that sustained some debarking.						
EF2	Elmer	Rapides	LA	31.1285°N 92.6814°W	02:09–02:27	8.43 mi (13.57 km)	500 yd (460 m)
EF2	A few homes and power poles were damaged, and many trees were snapped in and around Elmer. Some trees sustained debarking.						
EF2	S of Alexandria	Rapides	LA	31.1623°N 92.4582°W	02:26–02:38	8.98 mi (14.45 km)	550 yd (500 m)
EF2	1 death – Two mobile homes were demolished, resulting in one fatality. Numerous houses and trees were damaged, and numerous power poles were toppled. Substantial damage was inflicted to a livestock facility, and severe damage was also inflicted to farm and equipment buildings at the LSU-Alexandria Dean Lee Research Station.						
EF1	Lamourie	Rapides	LA	31.1222°N 92.4355°W	02:27–02:34	3.85 mi (6.20 km)	500 yd (460 m)
EF1	Outbuildings and sheds were damaged, power lines were snapped, and shingles were ripped off a roof.						
EF1	N of Ruby to NW of Effie	Rapides, Avoyelles	LA	31.2166°N 92.2562°W	02:42–02:53	5.36 mi (8.63 km)	200 yd (180 m)
EF1	A tornado caused considerable tree damage, some of which damaged a few homes upon falling.						
EF1	NE of Marksville	Catahoula, Avoyelles	LA	31.2412°N 91.9671°W	03:06–03:18	7.61 mi (12.25 km)	1,200 yd (1,100 m)
EF1	Trees and mobile homes were damaged.						
EF1	NW of Acme	Catahoula, Concordia	LA	31.2927°N 91.8805°W	03:17–03:25	4.01 mi (6.45 km)	880 yd (800 m)
EF1	Numerous trees were snapped, and a mobile home lost sections of its roof, siding, and metal awning.						

=== April 23 event ===
List of confirmed tornadoes – Thursday, April 23, 2020
EF#	Location	County / Parish	State	Start Coord.	Time (UTC)	Path length	Max width
EF2	WNW of Bunkie	Avoyelles	LA	30.9483°N 92.2519°W	06:08–06:14	3.62 mi (5.83 km)	100 yd (91 m)
EF2	Substantial damage was inflicted to hangars and aircraft at the Bunkie Airport. Trees were damaged as well.						
EF1	NE of Evergreen	Avoyelles	LA	30.9677°N 92.1011°W	06:20–06:23	1.13 mi (1.82 km)	100 yd (91 m)
EF1	Homes and outbuildings were damaged.						
EF1	S of Eunice	Acadia	LA	30.3997°N 92.4418°W	06:51–07:01	9.53 mi (15.34 km)	150 yd (140 m)
EF1	Trees, power lines, and a large shed were damaged.						
EF0	NNE of Florence to SE of Brandon	Rankin	MS	32.1744°N 90.1136°W	06:57–07:17	11.43 mi (18.39 km)	1,230 yd (1,120 m)
EF0	Numerous trees were snapped or uprooted.						
EF2	NE of Liberty to N of McComb	Amite, Pike	MS	31.2047°N 90.7432°W	08:07–08:28	18.3 mi (29.5 km)	1,760 yd (1,610 m)
EF2	A house had most of its roof torn off, and a large metal building was destroyed by this large, strong tornado. Numerous trees were snapped or uprooted along the path.						
EF0	NE of Salem	Marion	MS	31.318°N 90.037°W	08:57–09:04	6.49 mi (10.44 km)	200 yd (180 m)
EF0	Several trees were snapped or uprooted, including several that fell on a home.						
EF2	ENE of Soso to W of Eucutta	Jones	MS	31.7608°N 89.2247°W	09:14–09:30	16.85 mi (27.12 km)	2,640 yd (2,410 m)
EF2	A 1.5-mile (2.4 km) wide tornado developed just east of the path of an EF4 tornado 11 days prior. Moving north of Laurel, the tornado completely destroyed half of a chicken house and mowed down hundreds of trees, many of which fell on homes and caused severe damage. Numerous power lines were downed as well.						
EF1	NW of Waynesboro	Wayne	MS	31.8116°N 88.8782°W	09:33–09:35	1.8 mi (2.9 km)	350 yd (320 m)
EF1	Damage was confined to trees that were snapped or uprooted.						
EF1	N of Lucedale	George	MS	30.9349°N 88.6208°W	11:17–11:19	2.26 mi (3.64 km)	200 yd (180 m)
EF1	A few homes sustained minor roof damage. Otherwise, additional homes were damaged by some trees that were snapped or uprooted.						
EF1	ENE of Lucedale	George	MS	30.9381°N 88.5195°W	11:23–11:24	0.38 mi (0.61 km)	50 yd (46 m)
EF1	The roof of a mobile home was ripped off, causing its walls to collapse. Several trees were snapped or uprooted.						
EF1	E of Lucedale	George	MS	30.9322°N 88.5243°W	11:24–11:25	1.45 mi (2.33 km)	250 yd (230 m)
EF1	Numerous trees were snapped or uprooted, some of which were downed onto homes. A few houses and a church sustained roof and shingle damage. A travel trailer was flipped, injuring one person.						
EF1	NW of Chunchula	Mobile	AL	30.9642°N 88.3089°W	11:37–11:38	0.55 mi (0.89 km)	75 yd (69 m)
EF1	A tornado primarily damaged trees, but one fallen tree caused significant damage to a home. Another house had its garage door blown in, and a shed was heavily damaged.						
EF0	NE of Falco	Covington	AL	31.063°N 86.5700°W	13:42–13:43	0.37 mi (0.60 km)	50 yd (46 m)
EF0	Several trees were snapped or uprooted.						
EF0	NE of Florala	Covington	AL	31.0665°N 86.2524°W	13:53	0.01 mi (0.016 km)	25 yd (23 m)
EF0	A grain bin was damaged by this brief tornado.						
EF1	E of Pelham	Mitchell	GA	31.1314°N 84.1624°W	16:05–16:10	2.4 mi (3.9 km)	176 yd (161 m)
EF1	A large portion of the metal roof was ripped off an auto service building, and a nearby van was flipped. The metal awning at a warehouse, an outbuilding, and the roof of a home were damaged. Numerous trees were snapped or uprooted.						
EF1	S of Moultrie to E of Adel	Colquitt, Cook	GA	31.13°N 83.95°W	16:34–17:10	37.24 mi (59.93 km)	650 yd (590 m)
EF1	A long-tracked, high-end EF1 tornado caused significant damage to a warehouse and caused minor roof damage to a home. Several billboards and tall signs were damaged as it crossed I-75. In Adel, large sections of two warehouses were torn away. A large shed was severely damaged, and numerous trees were snapped or uprooted, some of which were snapped near their bases.						
EF0	NNW of Dupont	Lanier, Clinch	GA	31.093°N 82.9832°W	17:28–17:34	2.24 mi (3.60 km)	50 yd (46 m)
EF0	Many trees were snapped and a home sustained roof damage.						
EF0	Northern Waycross to Bonneyman	Ware, Pierce	GA	31.22°N 82.47°W	18:05–18:29	8.97 mi (14.44 km)	50 yd (46 m)
EF0	A large tree was snapped, causing severe damage to the roof and walls of a mobile home upon falling.						
EF0	S of Waycross to WSW of Schlatterville	Ware	GA	31.17°N 82.35°W	18:15–18:24	7.49 mi (12.05 km)	Unknown
EF0	A tornado snapped a large tree and it fell onto a mobile home causing severe damage to the roof and walls.						
EF0	SE of Bladen	Glynn	GA	31.1892°N 81.6689°W	18:59–19:00	0.47 mi (0.76 km)	50 yd (46 m)
EF0	A brief tornado caused no known damage.						
EF0	E of White Oak	Camden	GA	31.04°N 81.65°W	19:37–19:38	0.3 mi (0.48 km)	50 yd (46 m)
EF0	A brief tornado touched down over remote marshland, causing no known damage.						
EF1	Northern Fort Walton Beach	Okaloosa	FL	30.4442°N 86.6463°W	19:51–19:54	2.7 mi (4.3 km)	50 yd (46 m)
EF1	Numerous trees were snapped or uprooted in the northern part of Fort Walton Beach. Homes sustained minor damage to their siding and roofs.						
EF1	Defuniak Springs to WSW of Ponce De Leon	Walton, Holmes	FL	30.71°N 86.12°W	20:13–20:20	9.07 mi (14.60 km)	100 yd (91 m)
EF1	Four windows of a series of businesses at a strip mall were blown in. A large retail business had a portion of its roof peeled back and a few HVAC units tossed off. Numerous trees were snapped or uprooted, and business signs were downed.						
EF0	SW of Bonifay	Washington	FL	30.7282°N 85.7412°W	20:33–20:36	2.68 mi (4.31 km)	100 yd (91 m)
EF0	Multiple trees were uprooted.						
EF2	SW of Chipley to SW of Marianna	Washington, Jackson	FL	30.72°N 85.59°W	20:48–21:05	17.24 mi (27.75 km)	400 yd (370 m)
EF2	Hundreds of trees were snapped or uprooted. A two-story outbuilding was completely destroyed at a farm, with debris tossed several hundred yards away. Several mobile homes sustained significant damage, including one that was demolished and had its frame wrapped around a tree.						
EF0	Panama City Beach	Bay	FL	30.18°N 85.81°W	21:00–21:13	13.4 mi (21.6 km)	75 yd (69 m)
EF0	A waterspout moved ashore in Panama City Beach, causing only minor damage there. Farther inland, several unsecured construction trailers and one camper trailer were destroyed.						
EF0	N of Lynn Haven	Bay	FL	30.29°N 85.65°W	21:09–21:12	0.9 mi (1.4 km)	50 yd (46 m)
EF0	Tree limbs and power lines were damaged.						
EF1	SW of Lake Jackson to Bradfordville	Leon	FL	30.52°N 84.35°W	22:22–22:38	10.58 mi (17.03 km)	600 yd (550 m)
EF1	This tornado moved through the north side of Tallahassee, snapping and uprooting numerous trees. One uprooted tree landed on a home.						
EF1	NE of Wakulla Springs	Wakulla	FL	30.25°N 84.26°W	22:54–23:00	3.85 mi (6.20 km)	100 yd (91 m)
EF1	Trees were snapped or uprooted, at least one of which fell onto a home.						
EF1	Keaton Beach	Taylor	FL	29.83°N 83.6°W	23:56–00:00	0.46 mi (0.74 km)	100 yd (91 m)
EF1	A tornadic waterspout moved ashore in Keaton Beach, ripping the concrete pilings out of the ground at a boat rental facility.						
EF0	NW of Williford	Gilchrist	FL	29.84°N 82.87°W	01:11–01:12	0.6 mi (0.97 km)	50 yd (46 m)
EF0	A brief tornado touched down over an unpopulated area, causing no damage.						

=== Onalaska–Seven Oaks, Texas ===
Onalaska–Seven Oaks, Texas
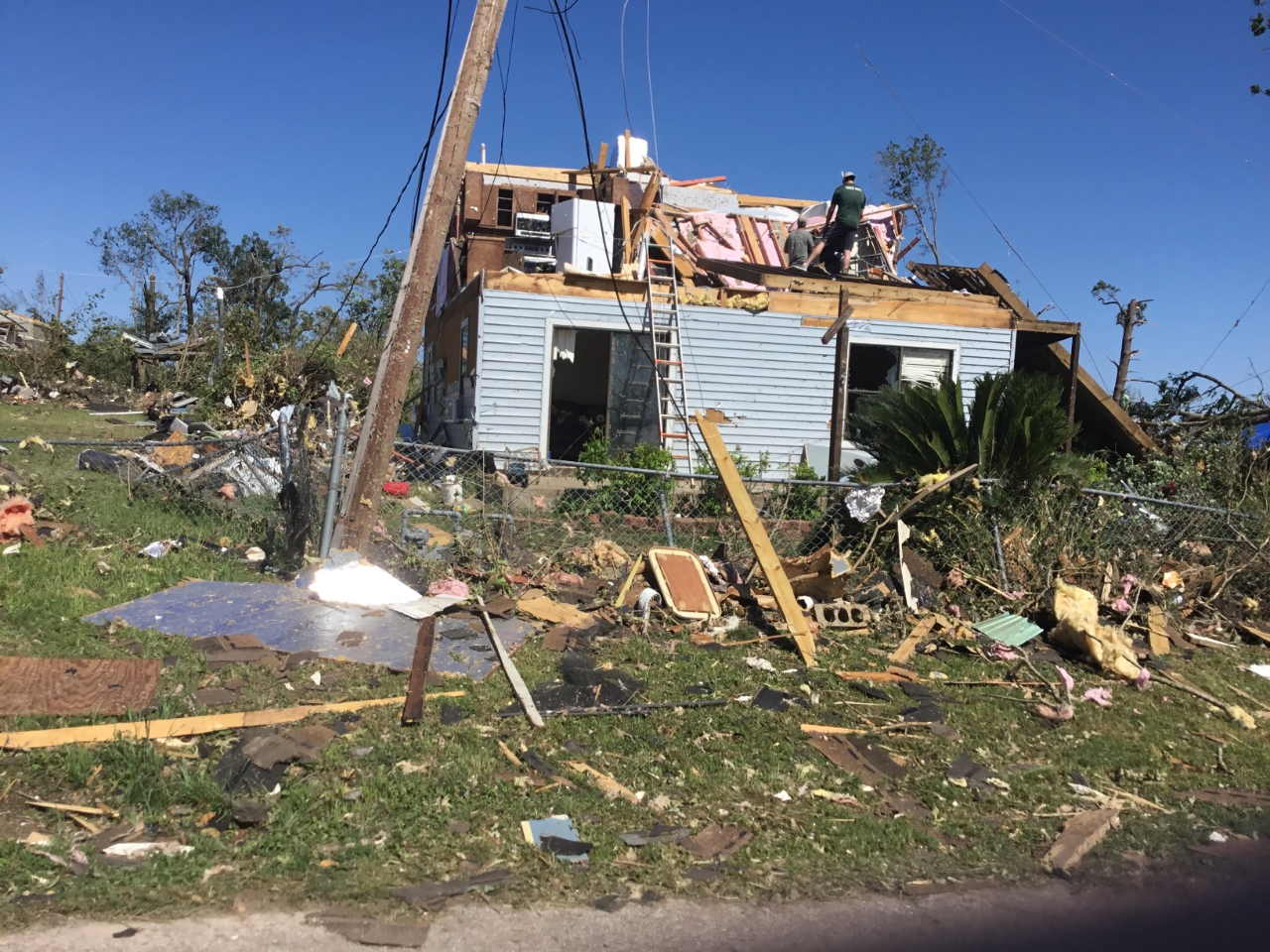
- EF3 damage to a house in Onalaska, Texas.

Meteorological history
- Formed: April 22, 2020, 5:35 p.m. CDT (UTC−06:00)
- Dissipated: April 22, 2020, 6:15 p.m. CDT (UTC−06:00)
- Duration: 40 minutes

EF3 tornado
- on the Enhanced Fujita scale
- Highest winds: 140 mph (230 km/h)

Overall effects
- Fatalities: 3
- Injuries: 33
- Damage: $5 million

This large, intense wedge tornado first touched down at 5:35 p.m. CDT (22:35 UTC) in Trinity County along the north shore of Lake Livingston northwest of Onalaska south of FM 356. It then quickly crossed into Polk County and moved along the north shore of the lake, blowing down several trees while throwing several others into the lake. The tornado then rapidly strengthened as it briefly moved over the north part of the lake before causing major damage in Onalaska. Reaching low-end EF3 intensity, it first struck the Paradise Acres community on a small peninsula in the northwestern part of town. Numerous homes and manufactured homes were heavily damaged or destroyed in this area, and many trees were snapped or denuded as well. A few well-built frame homes sustained loss of their roofs and exterior walls along this segment of the path. It then moved back over Lake Livingston before moving ashore on the north side of Onalaska. The tornado was slightly weaker here, but still produced widespread high-end EF2 damage as many manufactured and site-built homes in neighborhoods south of FM 356 were damaged or destroyed, with debris strewn throughout the area. Dozens of trees were snapped or uprooted as the tornado crossed FM 356 before it entered another neighborhood on the northeast side of town. Several frame homes had their roofs torn off and exterior walls collapsed along and east of FM 3459 while other manufactured homes were completely destroyed. All three deaths and 33 injuries from the tornado occurred in Onalaska. The tornado weakened as it moved east-northeast out of Onalaska and crossed over the extreme northeastern part of Lake Livingston. Trees and homes along the shore were damaged at EF1 strength before the tornado moved into rural areas of Polk County and crossed FM 3152, mostly snapping or uprooting countless hardwood and softwood trees, although one house along FM 350 suffered roof damage. The tornado then reached its peak width of over one-half-mile (0.80 km) wide as it tore through the north side of Seven Oaks while restrengthening to EF2 intensity. Two mobile homes were completely destroyed as the tornado crossed US 59 and hardwood trees in the area were snapped, denuded, and partially debarked. The tornado then weakened back to EF1 strength as it continued to the east-northeast, damaging more trees, including one large tree that fell on a mobile home, destroying it while barely missing a man sitting at his computer. The tornado then dissipated near FM 942 southwest of Barnes at 6:15 p.m. CDT (23:15 UTC).

The tornado was on the ground for 40 minutes and tracked 29.78 miles (47.93 km), with a peak width of 1,100 yards (1,000 m). A total of 291 homes were affected by the tornado in Onalaska alone, 46 of which were destroyed. All three fatalities and 33 injures were also in Onalaska. This was the first of multiple strong tornadoes from this long–tracked supercell. This was also the second time Onalaska had been struck by a strong tornado with the first time being May 1, 1967, when an F2 tornado moved through town, injuring two people.

== See also ==
- List of North American tornadoes and tornado outbreaks
- List of United States tornadoes in April 2020
