= Phoenix, Georgia =

Unincorporated community in Georgia, U.S.

Coordinates: 33°21′57″N 83°16′40″W

Phoenix is an unincorporated community in Putnam County, in the U.S. state of Georgia.

== History ==
A post office called Phoenix was established in 1895, and remained in operation until 1903. The community was named after the mythological phoenix, since the pioneer town site had been burned down by Indians.
