= NorthRiver Yacht Club =

Private golf club in Alabama

Coordinates: 33°17′38″N 87°30′02″W

NorthRiver Yacht Club is a private golf club in Tuscaloosa, Alabama. It opened in 1978. The course was designed by Gary Player, but was redesigned in 1997 and 2015 by architect Bob Cupp. The course features tifeagle bermudagrass greens. and is set up to challenge expert players while still playable by beginners. The club also contains the Wee Links, which is an area for players to work on shorter shots, and practice greens for putting.

The course is owned and Operated by Troon, which took ownership in 2015.

The signature hole at NorthRiver is the 17th, which is a par 3 hole featuring a green on a peninsula, surrounded on three sides by water.

Besides golf, NorthRiver offers 11 lit tennis courts, an outdoor pool open during the summer, and a smaller heated indoor outdoor pool open year-round. Dining is available at The Warner Lodge, a hotel.
