= Veazey, Georgia =

Unincorporated community in Georgia, U.S.

Coordinates: 33°30′16″N 83°08′28″W

Veazey is an unincorporated community in Greene County, in the U.S. state of Georgia.

== History ==
A post office called Veazey was established in 1881, and remained in operation until 1933. The community was named after Eli A. Veazey, a local merchant and early postmaster. A variant name was "Veazy".
