= Armstrong, Oklahoma =

Town in Oklahoma, US

- Town
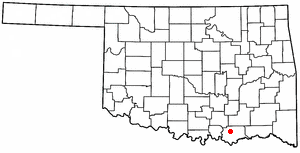
- Location of Armstrong, Oklahoma
- Coordinates: 34°03′10″N 96°20′41″W
- Country: United States
- State: Oklahoma
- County: Bryan

Area
  - Total: 0.089 sq mi (0.23 km^{2})
  - Land: 0.089 sq mi (0.23 km^{2})
  - Water: 0 sq mi (0.00 km^{2})
- Elevation: 584 ft (178 m)

Population (2020)
  - Total: 113
  - Density: 1,300.7/sq mi (502.22/km^{2})
- Time zone: UTC-6 (Central (CST))
  - Summer (DST): UTC-5 (CDT)
- FIPS code: 40-02750
- GNIS feature ID: 2411645

Armstrong is a town in Bryan County, Oklahoma, United States, along the Blue River. As of the 2020 census, Armstrong had a population of 113. The town was named for Frank C. Armstrong, a member of the Dawes Commission.

== History ==
The town of Armstrong began along the route of the Missouri-Kansas-Texas Railroad (Katy) in 1872. At the time of Armstrong's founding it was located in Blue County of the Choctaw Nation. The town had a post office in 1882–3, but thereafter the mail was sent to Caddo. In 1896, another post office opened in Armstrong, but it was closed in 1920. The post office was located in the only grocery store, and the store owner was also the postmaster. In 1911, the population was 41.

The Oklahoma Office of the Game Warden (now the Department of Wildlife Conservation) established a fish hatchery in the town about 1916. Otherwise the town survived economically by serving small farms in the area and catering to the needs of sport fishermen who were attracted to the Blue River and nearby Lake Texoma, By 1980, the town had 133 residents. The population dropped to 122 in 1990, then rose to 141 in 2000. It dropped again, and was 105 in 2010.

=== Armstrong's mayors ===
Armstrong has had two recorded mayors. The first mayor of Armstrong was Steve Williamson who lead the town through 30 years of continuous service. Steve Williamson retired from being the mayor in April 2024, which marked the first mayoral transition in the town's recent history. Joey Bailey was elected following Steve Williamson's retirement. One of Joey Bailey's first major acts was presiding over a council meeting to present Williamson with a plaque for his "outstanding service" to the town. Joey Bailey is the current mayor of Armstrong as of April 30, 2026.

== Geography ==
Armstrong is located 5 miles (8.0 km) north of Durant.

According to the United States Census Bureau, the town has a total area of 0.1 square miles (0.26 km^{2}), all land.

== Demographics ==
Historical population
Census	Pop.	Note	%±
1990	122		—
2000	141		15.6%
2010	105		−25.5%
2020	113		7.6%
U.S. Decennial Census

=== 2020 census ===
As of the 2020 census, Armstrong had a population of 113. The median age was 33.5 years. 24.8% of residents were under the age of 18 and 15.0% of residents were 65 years of age or older. For every 100 females there were 71.2 males, and for every 100 females age 18 and over there were 73.5 males age 18 and over.

0.0% of residents lived in urban areas, while 100.0% lived in rural areas.

There were 37 households in Armstrong, of which 37.8% had children under the age of 18 living in them. Of all households, 62.2% were married-couple households, 18.9% were households with a male householder and no spouse or partner present, and 16.2% were households with a female householder and no spouse or partner present. About 18.9% of all households were made up of individuals and 10.8% had someone living alone who was 65 years of age or older.

There were 47 housing units, of which 21.3% were vacant. The homeowner vacancy rate was 6.7% and the rental vacancy rate was 18.2%.

Racial composition as of the 2020 census
Race	Number	Percent
White	58	51.3%
Black or African American	1	0.9%
American Indian and Alaska Native	29	25.7%
Asian	0	0.0%
Native Hawaiian and Other Pacific Islander	0	0.0%
Some other race	3	2.7%
Two or more races	22	19.5%
Hispanic or Latino (of any race)	5	4.4%

=== 2010 census ===
As of the census of 2010, there were 105 people living in the town. The population density was 1,638.3 inhabitants per square mile (632.6/km^{2}). There were 60 housing units at an average density of 697.2 per square mile (269.2/km^{2}). The racial makeup of the town was 70.21% White, 0.71% African American, 21.99% Native American, and 7.09% from two or more races.

There were 54 households, out of which 37.0% had children under the age of 18 living with them, 57.4% were married couples living together, 3.7% had a female householder with no husband present, and 33.3% were non-families. 20.4% of all households were made up of individuals, and 9.3% had someone living alone who was 65 years of age or older. The average household size was 2.61 and the average family size was 3.11.

In the town, the population was spread out, with 27.0% under the age of 18, 2.8% from 18 to 24, 35.5% from 25 to 44, 21.3% from 45 to 64, and 13.5% who were 65 years of age or older. The median age was 35 years. For every 100 females, there were 101.4 males. For every 100 females age 18 and over, there were 94.3 males.

The median income for a household in the town was $27,292, and the median income for a family was $30,556. Males had a median income of $20,833 versus $18,125 for females. The per capita income for the town was $12,765. There were 5.6% of families and 16.2% of the population living below the poverty line, including none under 18 and 25.0% of those over 64.
