= Bladen, Georgia =

Ghost town in Glynn County, Georgia

Coordinates: 31°14′41″N 81°42′07″W

Bladen is an extinct town in Glynn County, in the U.S. state of Georgia.

== History ==
A post office called Bladen was established in 1892, and remained in operation until 1937. In 1900, the community had 47 inhabitants.

== See also ==
- List of ghost towns in Georgia
