= Direct, Texas =

Direct
- Unincorporated community
- Interactive map of Direct
- Location within Texas Direct (the United States)
- Coordinates: 33°49′16″N 95°50′12″W
- Country: United States
- State: Texas
- County: Lamar County

Direct is an unincorporated community located along Farm Road 79 in Lamar County, Texas, United States.

== Etymology ==
Local traditions suggests that there are two theories regarding the etymology of this community's name. One suggests that it was associated with Oklahoman Native Americans that crossed the Red River "direct" to obtain whiskey. Another theory suggests that it's dedicated to an evangelist preacher whom believed that the community locals were at risk of going "direct" [sic] to hell.

== History ==
The community's post office operated from 1887, in which starting in 1896 its mail were starting to be delivered twice weekly, until its closure the mid 1950s. By 1914, the community had a population of 218 as well as several amenities such as a telephone booth, two blacksmiths, and four general stores. The population rose to 250 by 1945 and by 1949 it went on a steady decline, resulting in a population of 70 as well as a single business and two churches in the area by 1983. Since then, the population count remained steady in 2000.
