= 2020 Bassfield–Soso tornado =

2020 EF4 tornado in Mississippi, USA

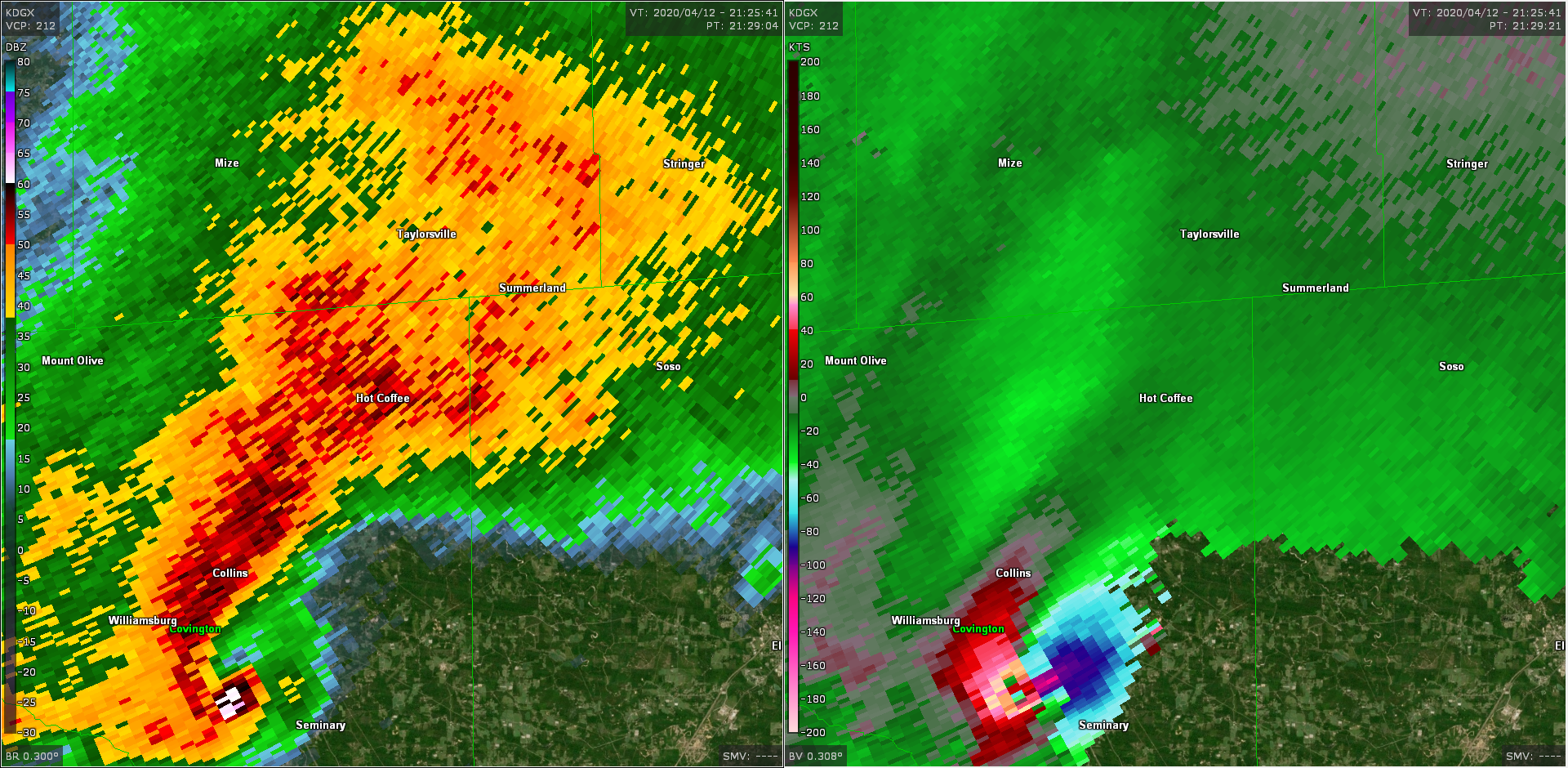
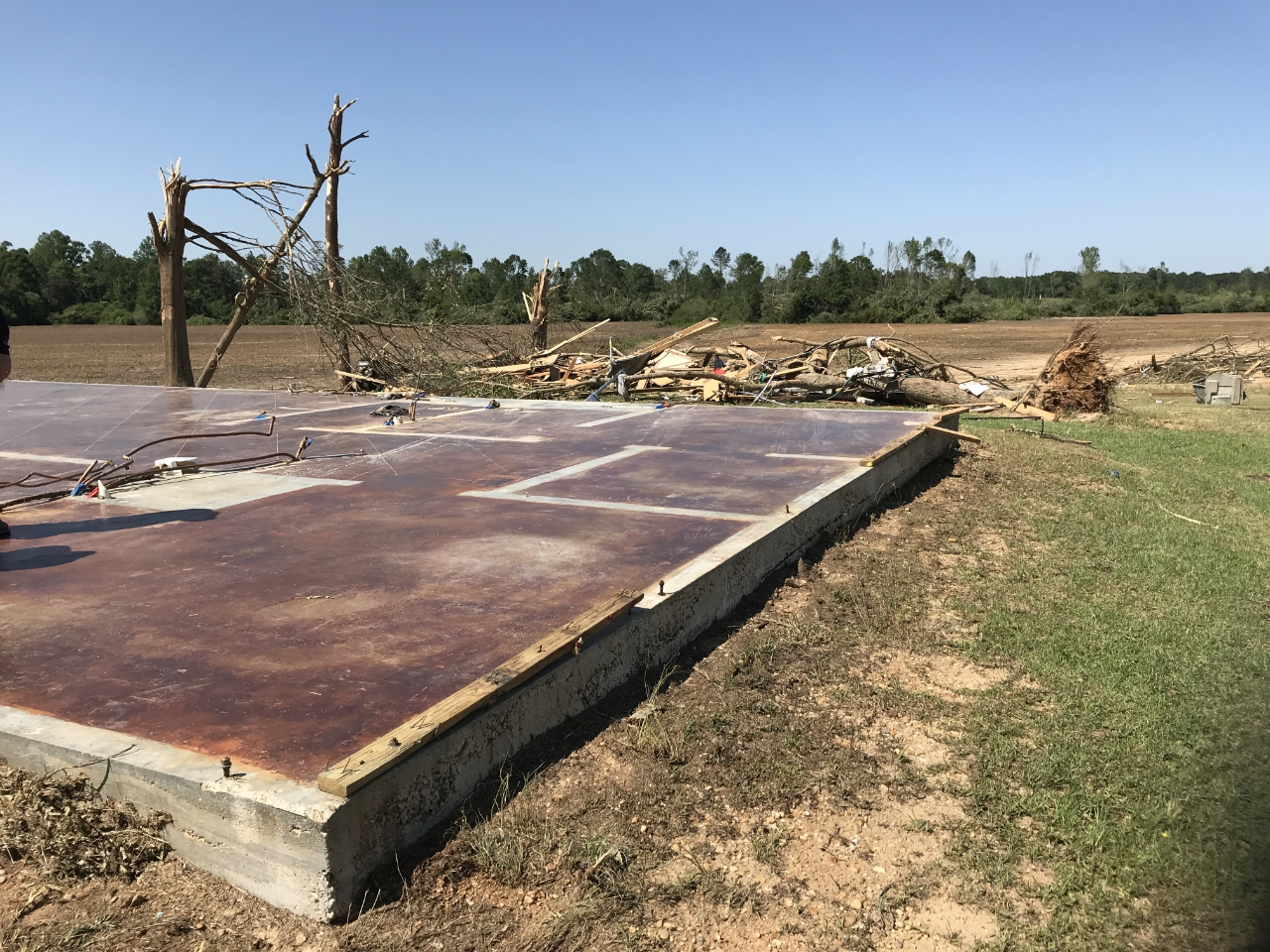
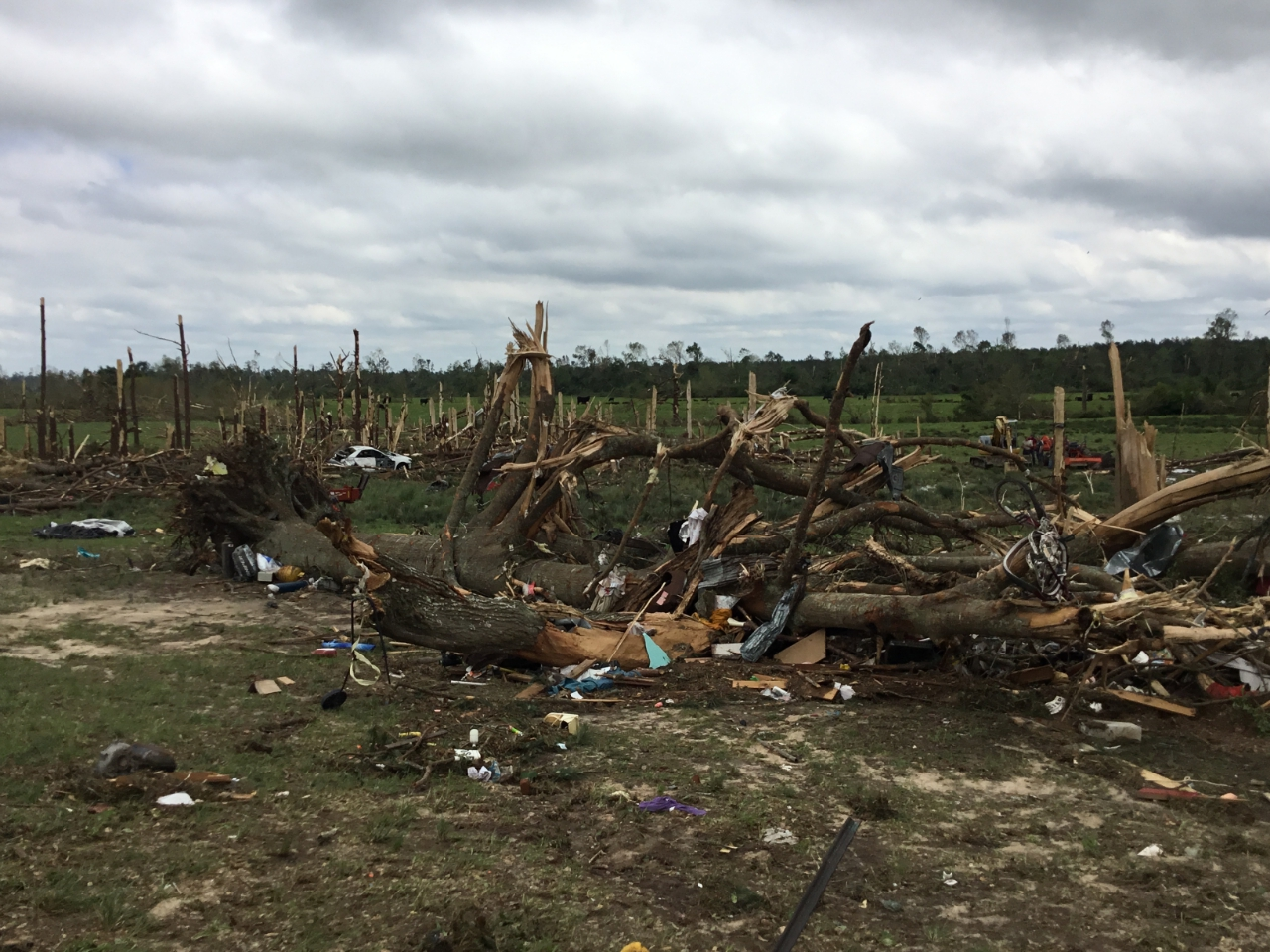
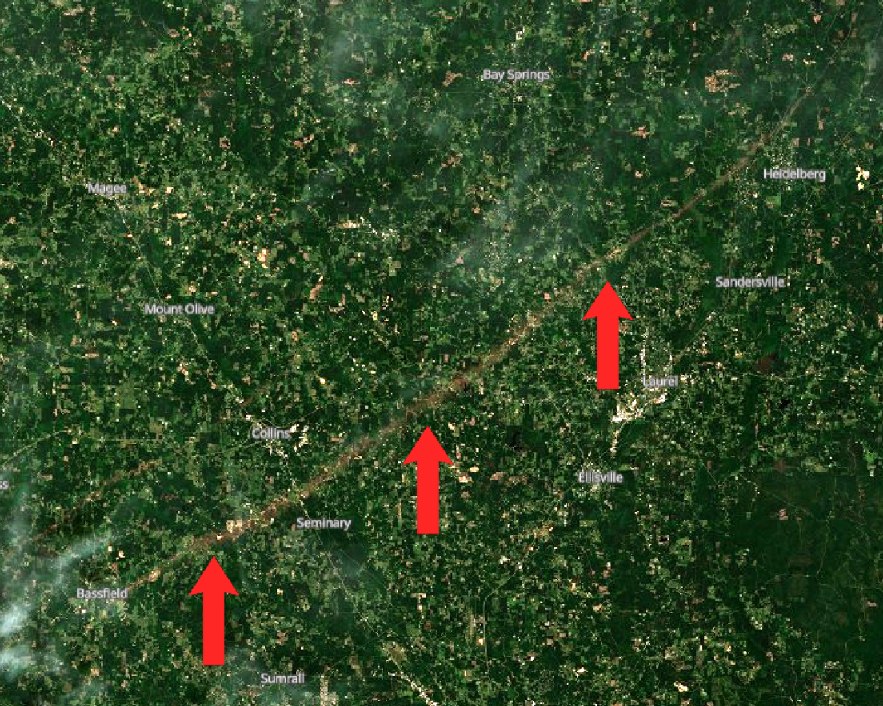
- Clockwise from top: The massive tornado seen near Soso, a well-built cabin swept clean at high-end EF4 strength near Cantwell Mills, satellite imagery of the scar left behind by the tornado; violent tree damage northeast of Bassfield; a Next-Generation Radar scan of the EF4 tornado, with the right panel showcasing a very intense velocity couplet and a debris ball on the left panel.

Meteorological history
- Formed: April 12, 2020, 4:12 p.m. CDT (UTC–5:00)
- Dissipated: April 12, 2020, 5:28 p.m. CDT (UTC–5:00)
- Duration: 1 hour, 16 minutes

EF4 tornado
- on the Enhanced Fujita scale
- Max width: 3,960 yards (2.25 mi; 3.62 km)
- Path length: 67.43 miles (108.52 km)
- Highest winds: 190 mph (310 km/h)

Overall effects
- Fatalities: 8
- Injuries: 99
- Damage: $73 million (2020 USD)
- Areas affected: Bassfield, Seminary, Soso, Moss, and Pachuta
- Part of the 2020 Easter tornado outbreak and tornadoes of 2020

During the afternoon hours of Easter Sunday, April 12, 2020, an enormous and powerful high-end EF4 tornado struck the southeastern parts of Bassfield and directly struck the communities of Soso, Moss, and Pachuta, Mississippi, as well as rural areas near Seminary and Heidelberg. Along its 67.43 mi (108.52 km) track, the tornado killed eight people and injured 99 others, causing losses of up to $73 million. The tornado was part of the massive 2020 Easter tornado outbreak, which produced 141 tornadoes, and was one of the three violent tornadoes of the outbreak.

The tornado touched down south of Bassfield, snapping trees, causing significant roof damage, and destroying a mobile home. As it intensified, several trees were violently debarked and denuded. The tornado then strengthened to high-end EF4 intensity as it struck the small community of Cantwell Mill. Several homes and a restaurant were heavily damaged or destroyed, including a well-constructed cabin that was swept away. The tornado continued, debarking and denuding several more trees and significantly damaging homes. The tornado weakened slightly before becoming violent for the second time, leveling a home near Seminary. More trees and infrastructure were severely damaged as the tornado entered Jones County, impacting the town of Soso, leveling a gas station and inflicting significant to intense damage to other homes and businesses in town. The tornado then impacted the community of Moss, causing catastrophic damage to multiple homes and businesses. The tornado continued northeast, inflicting significant damage to trees and infrastructure, before dissipating north of Pachuta.

The tornado itself had a peak width of 2.25 mi (3,960 yd), becoming the largest tornado in Mississippi history and the third-largest tornado on record in the United States, and the fourth widest worldwide, surpassing the Trousdale EF3 tornado and only behind the 2004 Hallam tornado, the 2016 Funing tornado, and the 2013 El Reno tornado. At one point, doppler radar recorded that the tornado was surrounded by a cloud of debris that was approximately five miles wide.

== Meteorological synopsis ==
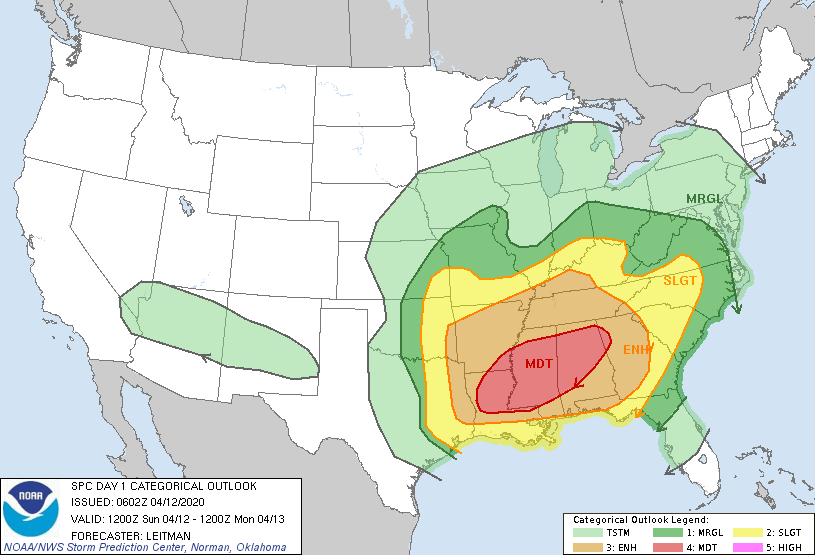
Day 1 Moderate Risk issued for most of Louisiana, Arkansas, Mississippi, and Alabama, accompanying a 15% tornado risk.

The first indications of organized severe weather came on April 8, when the Storm Prediction Center (SPC) outlined 15% probabilities for severe weather within 25 mi (40 km) of a point from central Texas eastward into the Florida Panhandle and eastern Georgia valid for April 11–12. These threat areas were later refined with the introduction of a day-3 moderate risk, the fourth of five threat levels, across northeastern Louisiana through central Alabama on April 10. Historically, the SPC issues one day-3 moderate risk every year, and half of those over the previous decade were later upgraded to High risk, the highest threat level. Over subsequent days, a significant mid-level shortwave trough progressed eastward across the United States. By the pre-dawn hours of April 12, mid-level cooling associated with the feature overspread the Edwards Plateau, Hill Country, and much of central Texas. Accordingly, an intense line of severe thunderstorms developed along a dry line while vigorous convective development formed farther east. These thunderstorms were initially isolated in nature but soon coalesced into a mesoscale convective system as they encountered an enhanced corridor of warm air streaming northward, as well as very strong wind shear. These initial storms produced scattered weak tornadoes in Texas during the early stages of the outbreak.

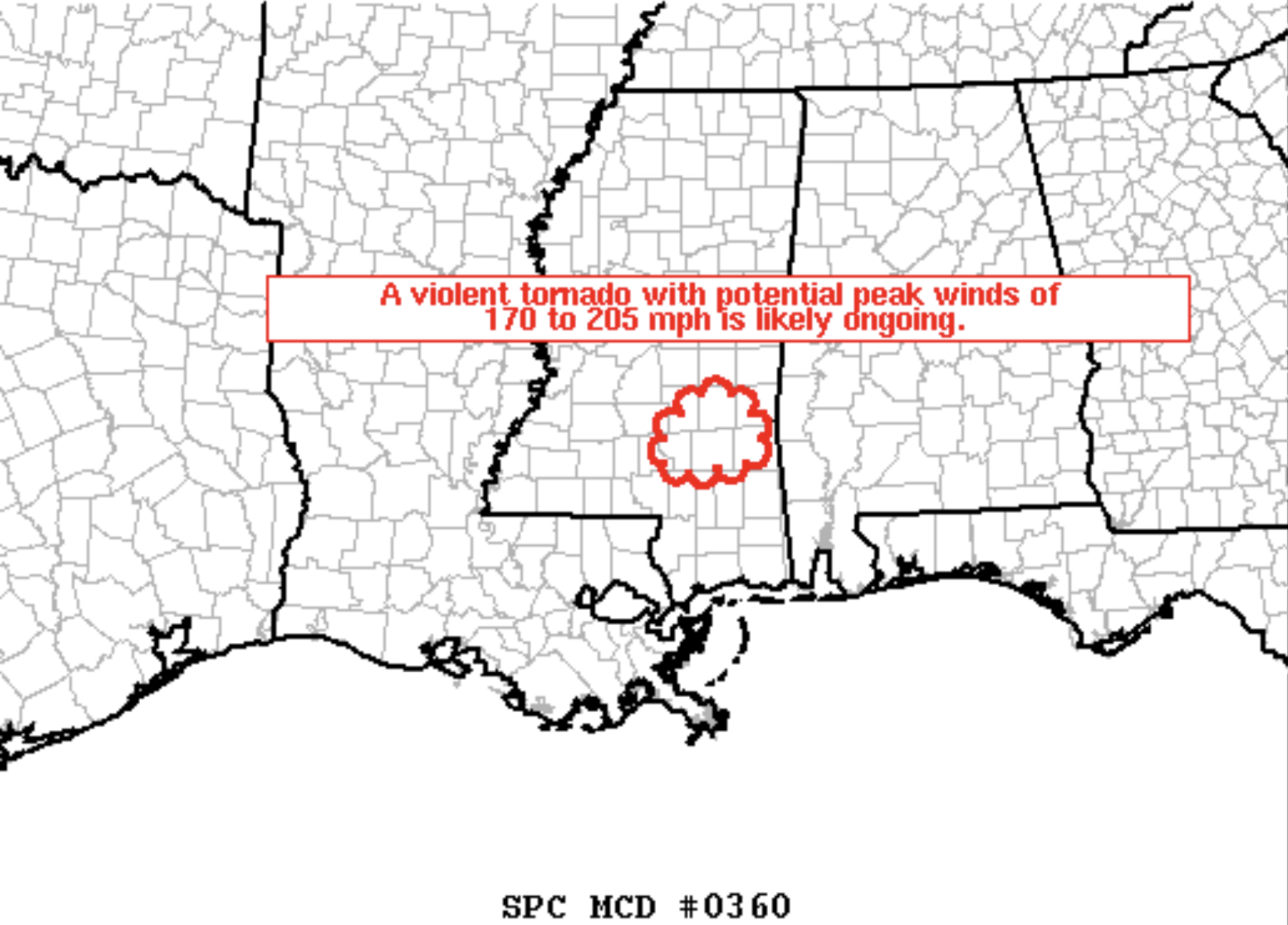
Mesoscale Discussion 360 on the Bassfield tornado outlining a specific corridor of a possible violent tornado ongoing.

This storm complex progressed across northern Louisiana through the late morning and early afternoon hours, and embedded circulations within the line began producing strong tornadoes, contributing to multiple tornado debris signatures visible on radar. The first strong tornado as well as the first one to cause casualties was in Desoto Parish, where an EF2 tornado destroyed manufactured homes and damaged trees and homes, injuring two people. The first intense and notable tornado was an EF3 tornado that triggered a tornado emergency as it moved through downtown Monroe, and damaging or destroying numerous homes, but there were no casualties. To the north, a second EF3 tornado near Sterlington caused extensive tree damage. In advance of the line, a lifting warm front aided in the formation of a very moist, highly unstable, and highly sheared environment across northeastern Louisiana and much of Mississippi. Accordingly, the SPC issued a particularly dangerous situation tornado watch into the late evening hours.

A weather balloon launch from Jackson, Mississippi, at 18:00 UTC revealed the presence of a capping inversion across the region. This cap was expected to weaken across central Mississippi. At the same time, forecasters expressed more uncertainty about its longevity across southern Mississippi and Louisiana. As a small area of low pressure progressed across northwestern Mississippi, it caused surface winds to turn out of the east-southeast, enhancing the potential for tornadoes. As a cluster of storms across central Mississippi progressed toward the northeast, it began to reintensify and develop embedded supercell characteristics with an attendant threat of strong tornadoes.

== Tornado track ==
=== Jefferson Davis County ===
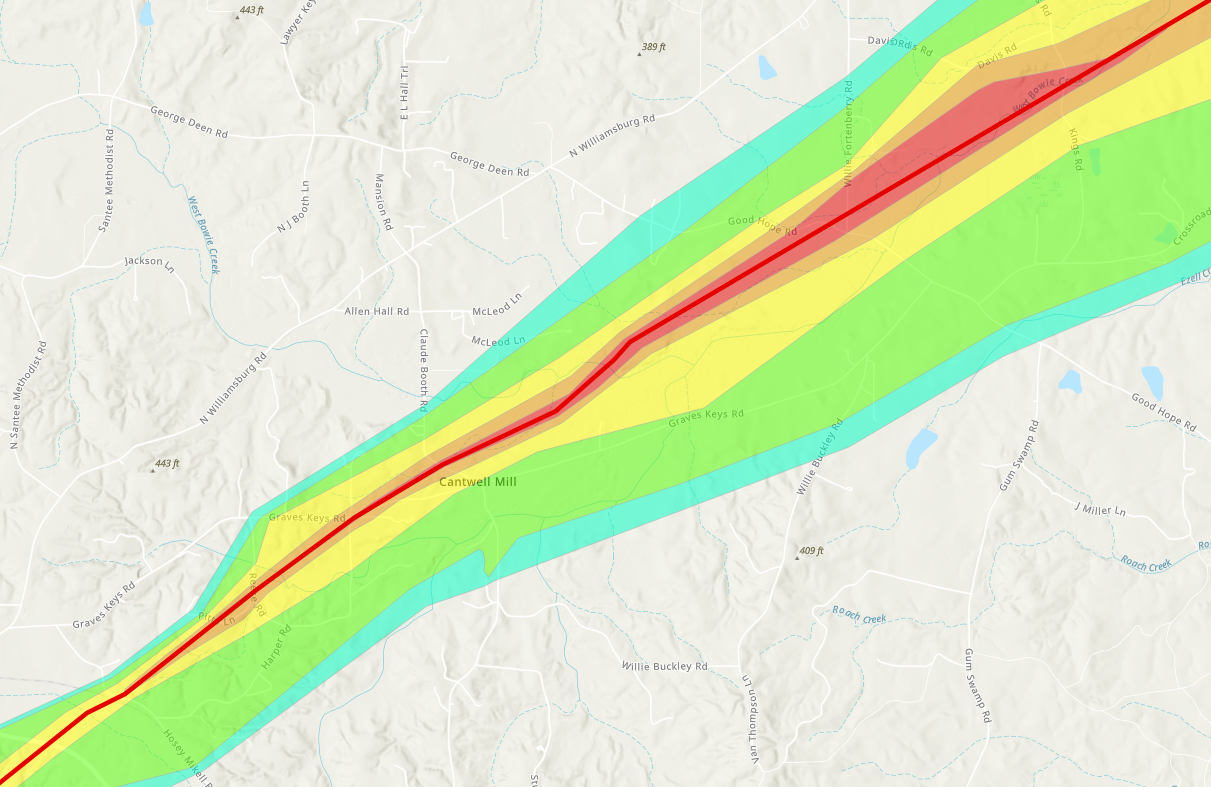
Path of the Bassfield tornado near Cantwell Mills Key EF0 65–85 mph EF1 86–110 mph EF2 111–135 mph EF3 136–165 mph EF4 166–190 mph ⎯ Center of the tornado

The supercell responsible for producing the violent Hope, Mississippi tornado quickly recycled and dropped the Bassfield tornado. A tornado emergency was still ongoing for Bassfield as a result of the Hope, Mississippi tornado. The tornado touched down a few miles south of Bassfield. First crossing Bassfield Cemetery Road, a couple of softwood trees were uprooted at EF1 intensity. The tornado continued to uproot and inflict minor damage to trees around Bass Road. The tornado soon intensified to low-end EF2 strength as it crossed Ray Hathorn Road; multiple softwood trees were snapped and many more were downed. The tornado, now 1,400 yd (1,300 m) wide, crossed MS 42, intensifying to mid-range EF2 strength; one home suffered severe roof damage, with large sections of it ripped off. Another home nearby received significant roof damage, with estimated wind speeds reaching 122 mph (196 km/h). Numerous softwood trees nearby were snapped or uprooted. At the Jefferson Thompson Complex, multiple sports facilities were destroyed by the tornado, with several fences and signs damaged. The tornado crossed Hosey Mikell Road, strengthening to low-end EF3 intensity, obliterating a mobile home and scattering debris over 300 yd (270 m) downstream. Along Harper Road, the tornado significantly snapped a softwood tree with of 114 mph (183 km/h) and also demolished an outbuilding. The tornado moved further northeast, additional intensification occurred as several softwood trees were snapped and debarked in large quantities. Crossing Pitts Lane, the tornado strengthened significantly to EF4 intensity. Hardwood trees were violently debarked and razed at 167 mph (269 km/h). More prolific tree damage was inflicted upon softwood trees, multiple of which were snapped and severely debarked.

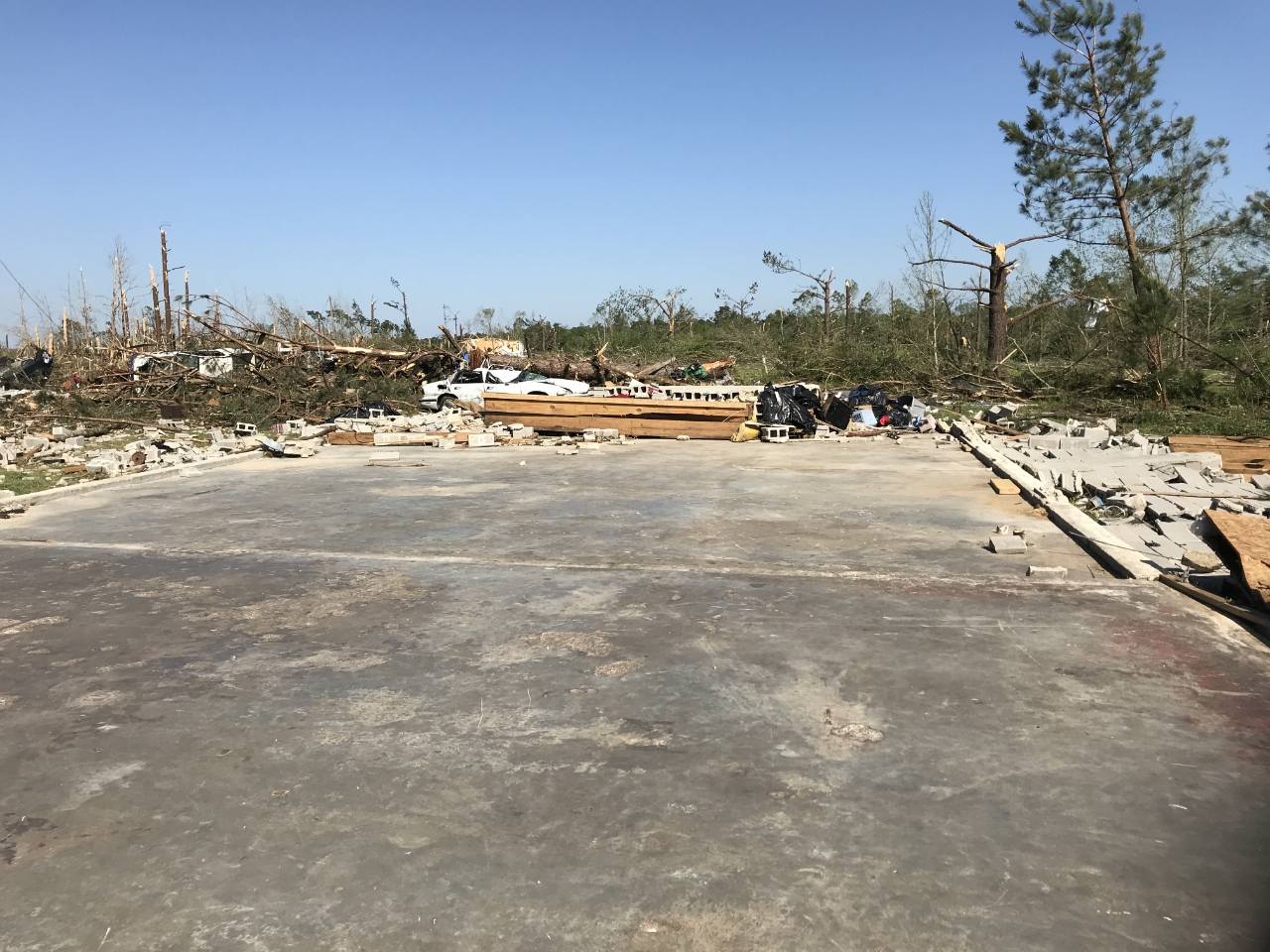
Mama D's Cafe was swept away by the Bassfield tornado at high-end EF3 intensity. Four fatalities were recorded in this location.

Remaining violent, the tornado heavily debarked, denuded, and snapped hardwood and softwood trees along Reese Road. A mobile home along the road was destroyed and another home nearby sustained significant roof damage. At around this time, the tornado was already 1,790 yd (1,640 m) wide. The tornado crossed Harper Road near an intersection between Graves Keys Road and C.T Prince Lane, where more major tree damage was noted. Along the intersection, with winds of 165 mph (266 km/h), the tornado completely swept off the foundation of Mama D's Cafe, killing four people that were inside the business. A manufactured home along William Harper Road was demolished with its undercarriage wrapped around a tree. A one-story home suffered severe exterior damage to its walls. Another mobile home was blown down along Graves Keys Road and Fannie's fish house along the road had its entire roof ripped off with its concrete walls still remaining intact. Extreme forestry damage continued as dozens of hardwood and softwood trees were heavily debarked and denuded.

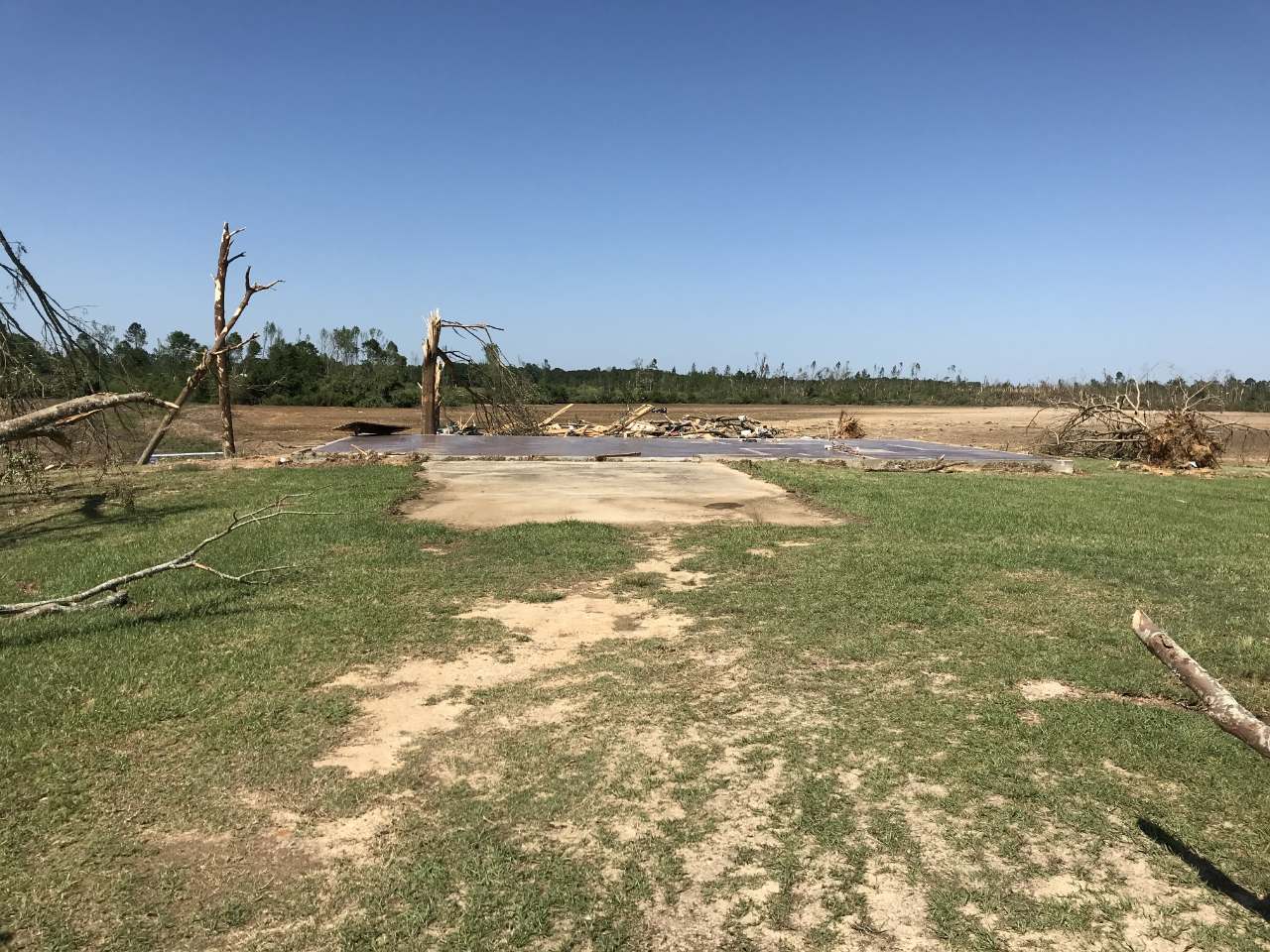
A wooden-cabin swept clean off of their foundation near Cantwell Mill at high-end EF4 intensity.

North of Graves Keys Road, the tornado abruptly intensified to high-end EF4 strength with estimated windspeeds up to 190 mph (310 km/h). A well-anchored wooden cabin was obliterated and swept clean at high-end EF4 intensity, with the metal roof being completely stripped away. Despite the path of the tornadic vortex through the field was visible, no significant scouring were noted. A truck parked near the home was thrown 300 yd (270 m) into a field, becoming mangled beyond recognition. Trees near the cabin were partially debarked. Continuing northeast, the tornado grew to 1.5 miles (2.4 km) wide. The tornado crossed Good Hope Road, more trees in this area were snapped and debarked. Around this area, farmers reported sixty cattle were killed by the tornado. The tornado was lofting debris over 25,000 ft and close to 27,000 ft.

On Willie Fortenberry Road, vehicles were thrown considerable distances and were damaged, numerous trees were downed and pointed in the direction opposite to the tornado's movement path. A brick home along the road suffered collapsing of their exterior walls, injuring one occupant. On Davis Road, a one-story home suffered major damage to its interior and exterior walls. The tornado crossed King Road; multiple hardwood trees were debarked at or near violent intensity, a home along the road received significant roof damage. The tornado weakened to low-end EF3 strength, more trees were debarked and homes nearby sustained moderate to severe damage. The tornado soon moved into Covington County.

=== Covington County ===
The National Weather Service in Jackson, Mississippi issued a tornado emergency for Covington, Jones, Jasper, and Smith counties at 5:01 PM (CST). At the same time, the Storm Prediction Center issued a rare meso-gamma discussion for the tornado, citing that the tornado had potential peak winds of up to 170-205 mph with high confidence of the tornado being violent. The tornado maintained low-end EF3 intensity, several trees was snapped and debarked along Seminary Mike Connor Road. A home along Stevie Sanford Road received significant damage to their exterior walls. As the tornado paralleled Robert McGowan Road, it slightly debarked and snapped multiple softwood trees, in addition to damaging the exterior walls of a home. The tornado crossed over McDonald Chapel Road, obliterating a mobile home and leveling most of the homes around the area. The tornado threw a vehicle, and intense tree damage continued here.

The tornado slightly intensified to 150 mph (240 km/h), bringing major damage to a home along Hughes Road. Adjacent to the home, numerous chicken homes were demolished and a mobile home was rolled over. The tornado became violent again, striking a small neighborhood along Cold Springs Road. A home on the road collapsed at low-end EF4 intensity. More trees were debarked, and a mobile home nearby was destroyed. At this point, the tornado reached a peak width of 3,960 yd (3,620 m), breaking the record to become the largest tornado recorded in Mississippi and third largest on record in the United States. The tornado weakened back to low-end EF3 intensity as it crossed US 49 northwest of Seminary, and shrunk back to 1.7 mi (2.7 km). A metal building system received intense damage. Along the highway; several more trees were debarked, a home experienced losses to their exterior walls.

Throughout northeast Covington county, thousands more trees were severely debarked and some homes were mostly leveled. Along Willow Grove Church Road, a metal building system was significantly damaged and a double-wide manufactured home was destroyed. A heavy concentration of snapped and debarked softwood and hardwood trees around the Brent Knight Road area were noted. Soon, the tornado exited Covington county.

=== Jones County ===
The tornado moved into Jones County at low-end EF3 intensity, debarking trees near the Leaf River. Alongside Hebron Centerville Road, a chicken house was demolished, significant tree debarking was noted nearby and a mobile home was ripped off its unit and rolled, causing severe damage. More trees were debarked as the tornado crossed US 84. The tornado's size increased to 3,520 yd (3,220 m) around this area. The tornado crossed Danny Hilbun Road where a home sustained major damage. On Sumrall Bridge Road, more homes received significant damage and severe tree debarking.

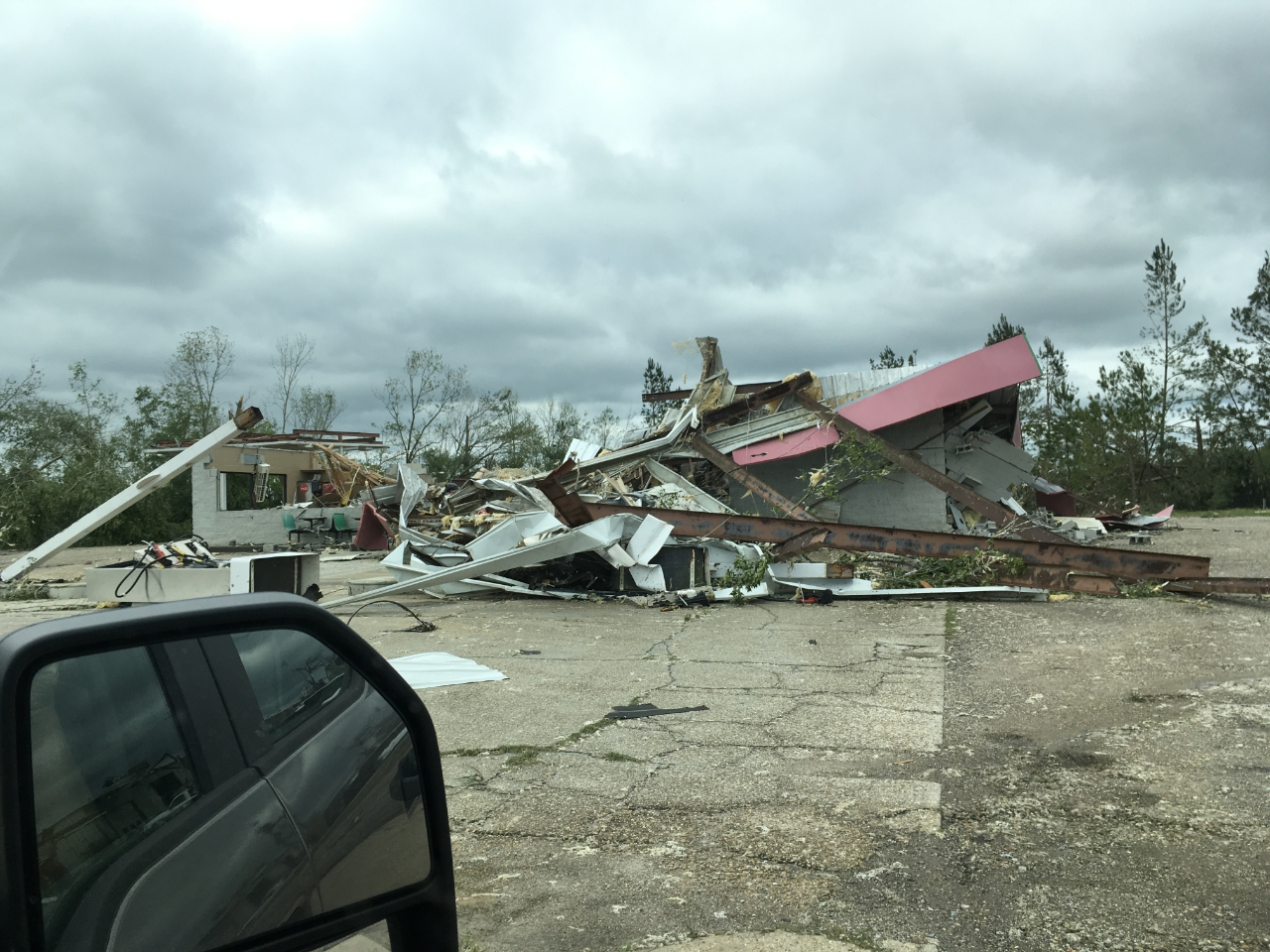
Low-end EF4 damage to a gas station in Soso, Mississippi

South of Soso, near Highway 29, a one-story home received significant roof damage and a small barn was leveled. A chicken home down the street was destroyed. Passing southeast of Soso along Highway 28, the tornado reattained low-end EF4 intensity. A gas station was destroyed with estimated windspeeds of 167 mph (269 km/h). A home in Soso suffered severe damage but a pound cake, that was left on the counter, was left untouched despite the destruction around it. The First Baptist Church sustained major damage; the steeple was ripped off and some of the roof collapsed. The Soso Volunteer Fire Station received significant damage as the garage doors caved in and the roof sustained heavy damage. The Soso Elementary School sustained moderate damage as the flagpole on campus was bent and the roof was damaged. The town's post office was heavily damaged by the tornado. Along Gavin Street, Greer's, the only grocery store in Soso, was heavily damaged by the tornado; the windows and doors were blown down and the roof sustained significant damage. The store later closed and was declared a total loss. A mobile home nearby the grocery store was destroyed. Multiple homes along Feed Mill Road sustained moderate to intense damage after experiencing winds of 116–145 mph (187–233 km/h).

The tornado weakened to mid-range EF2 intensity. A mobile home was obliterated along Shady School Road with winds of 127 mph (204 km/h). For the remainder of the path through Jones County, numerous trees were snapped or uprooted. A home's exterior walls collapsed, a home northeast of Matthews suffered significant damage and a vehicle was thrown a hundred yards downhill. Along Highway 537, numerous mobile homes were demolished and an outbuilding was leveled. Soon the tornado left Jones County.

=== Jasper and Clarke Counties ===
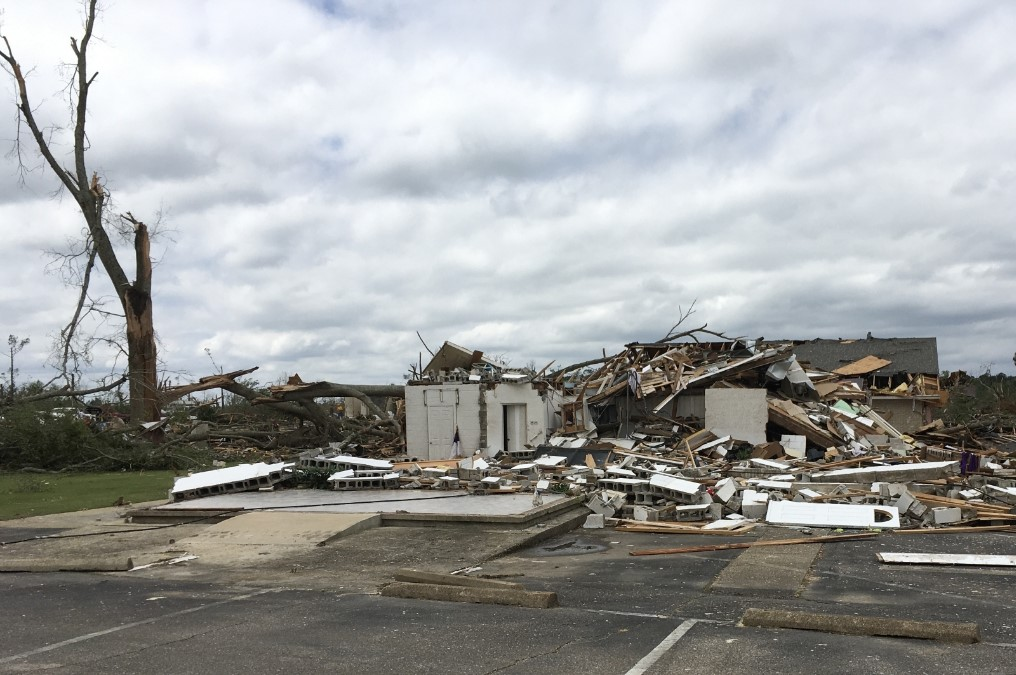
A church destroyed at low-end EF4 intensity in Moss, Mississippi. With estimated wind speeds up to 175 mph.

Upon entering Jasper County, the tornado intensified to low-end EF4 intensity. First Baptist Church of Moss along Jasper County Highway 537 were leveled by the tornado, church members suffered injuries but no one died. Several homes nearby were reduced to rubble. Numerous homes sustained major roof damage, alongside widespread trees and power poles damage, with most of them being snapped. A family of four survived the tornado by hiding in their concrete closet. The entire home was leveled with the closet still intact. Along County Road 5375, a slew of mobile homes were demolished and framed homes received significant damage with more than half having their roofs removed. A small truck was thrown several hundred yards and completely mangled.

Afterwards, the tornado weakened to low-end EF2 intensity, significantly damaging a framed home, destroying an outbuilding, along with multiple trees snapped or uprooted. The tornado crossed County Road 31, strengthening slightly to mid-range EF2 intensity. A framed home received significant roof damage and a small barn was destroyed. East of Heidelberg, the tornado maintained low-end EF2 intensity; several trees were snapped or uprooted, multiple outbuildings were leveled, and some homes received significant damage. The tornado weakened further to high-end EF1 status, several more trees were snapped or uprooted and homes sustained light damage. Soon the tornado left Jasper County.

In Clarke County, the town of Pachuta was struck by the weakening tornado. It downed trees and caused minor structural damage, with the metal roofing from a church being peeled off. The tornado later dissipated two miles north of Pachuta. The tornado traveled 67.43 mi (108.52 km) and had a maximum estimated wind speeds of 190 mph (310 km/h) and peak width of 2.25 mi (3.62 km) wide, becoming the largest tornado ever recorded in the state of Mississippi, surpassing the Yazoo City tornado, as well as become the third largest tornado ever recorded in the United States, behind the 2004 Hallam tornado and 2013 El Reno tornado. With a path nearing 68 miles long, tying for the 24th longest-tracked tornado on record in Mississippi.

== Aftermath ==
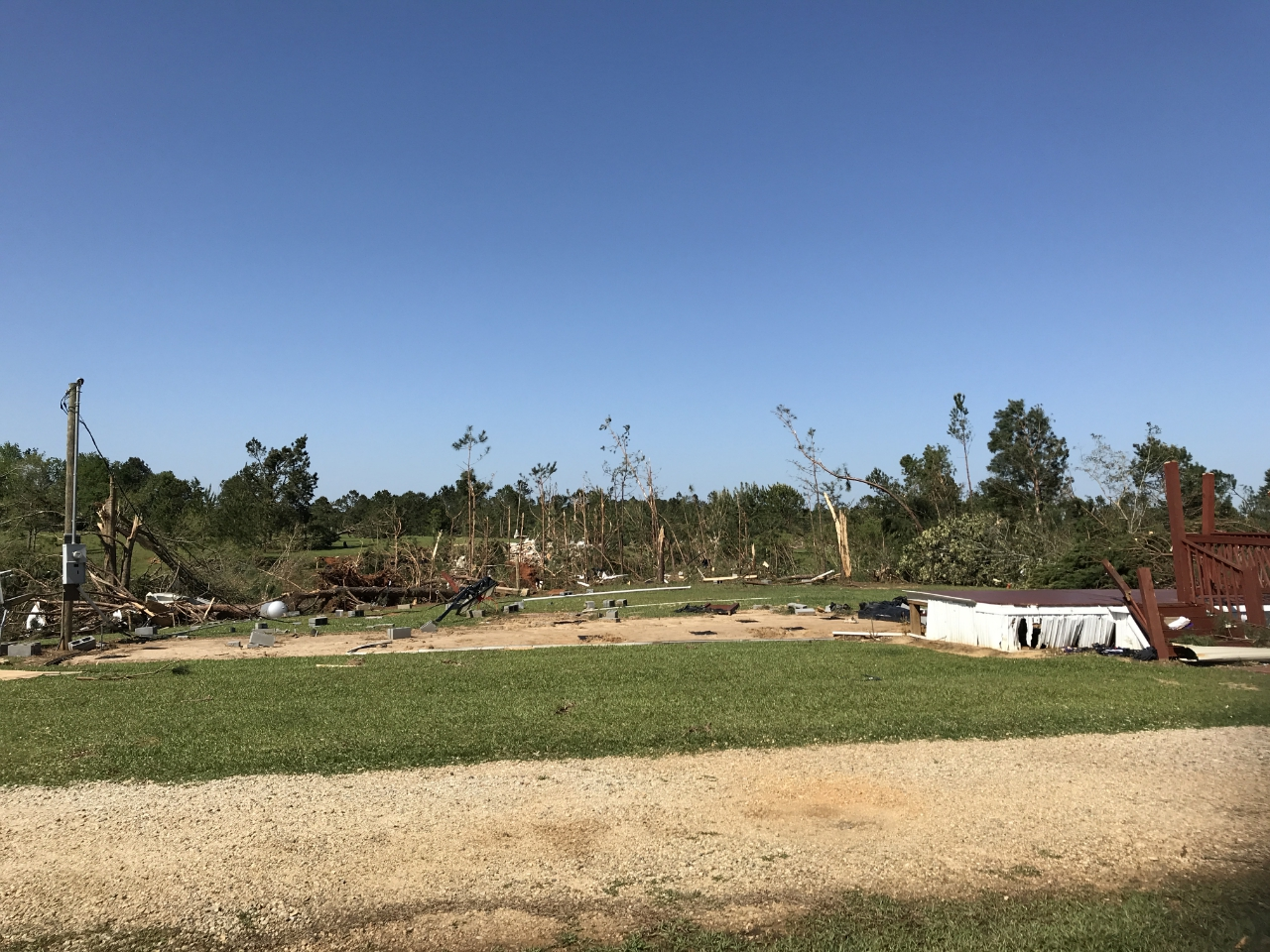
Low-end EF3 damage to a mobile home near Bassfield, Mississippi with estimated windspeeds of 140 mph.

The tornado resulted in four fatalities in Jefferson Davis county and four more injuries, $20.5 million in damages were done in the county. In Covington county, five people were injured and $29.5 million in damages. In Jones county, four people died, 3 directly and 1 indirectly, and $14.8 million in damages were done. In Jasper County, six people were injured and $8.8 million in damages were done in the county. In Clarke County, 4 people were injured and $190,000 in damages were done. Thousands to millions of trees were destroyed. American meteorologist and tornado expert Thomas P. Grazulis published that the width of the tornado was 2,000 yards (1,800 m; 1.1 mi; 1.8 km), smaller than the official width of 2.25 miles (3.62 km).

Families who suffered any form of damage from severe storms across Covington, Jefferson Davis and Jones counties were eligible for disaster assistance by Federal Emergency Management Agency (FEMA), with President Donald Trump declaring the three counties as a federal disaster area. The Mississippi Emergency Management Agency (MEMA) opened up disaster assistance centers across Jefferson Davis, Covington, and Jones counties, though the COVID-19 pandemic complicated disaster assistance response to the communities impacted. The Mississippi Emergency Management Agency partnered with Jasper County Emergency Management Agency to open up a disaster assistance center in Bay Springs. Governor Tate Reeves declared a state of emergency for Mississippi. A few days after the tornado, Reeves and US Homeland Security Secretary Chad Wolf, toured the damage in communities impacted by the tornadoes. Reeves addressed the residents of Soso at the front entrances of the heavily damaged First Baptist Church. Recover, Rebuild, Restore South Mississippi (R3SM) group partnered with the counties of Jefferson Davis and Covington to help the counties' tornado victims. R3SM cited that 200 families were in need of assistance.

The post office in Soso was repaired and reopened few months after the tornado. During the repair time, a trailer was set up in the parking lot for retail and post office services. A month after the tornado, Jasper County was still not declared eligible for public assistance, meaning the county was still unable to clear the multiple pile of debris lining up sides of roads, with the county's request still being under review by FEMA. A few days after the tornado, NFL and native born Bassfield players A. J. Moore and Cornell Armstrong went to Bassfield to hand out 100 supply boxes to victims of the tornado at Jefferson Davis County High School, helping out 100 families in Jefferson Davis County. St. Peter's Catholic Church in Bassfield gave out free meals to survivors of the tornado, ultimately feeding hundreds of people. Covington County Churches in Seminary and Collins provide relief supplies to victims affected by the Bassfield tornado and the Collins EF3 tornado.

=== Possible EF5 intensity ===
On January 23, 2025, Anthony W. Lyza with the National Severe Storms Laboratory along with Harold E. Brooks and Makenzie J. Kroca with the University of Oklahoma's School of Meteorology published a paper to the American Meteorological Society, where they stated the tornado in Bassfield was an "EF5 candidate" and opined that the EF5 starting wind speed should be 190 mph (310 km/h) instead of 201 mph (323 km/h).

== See also ==
- List of F4, EF4, and IF4 tornadoes (2020–present)
- Tornado records
- 2010 Yazoo City tornado – Another massive tornado that occurred in Mississippi that previously held the record for the state's largest tornado.
