= Cornell Armstrong =

American football player (born 1995)

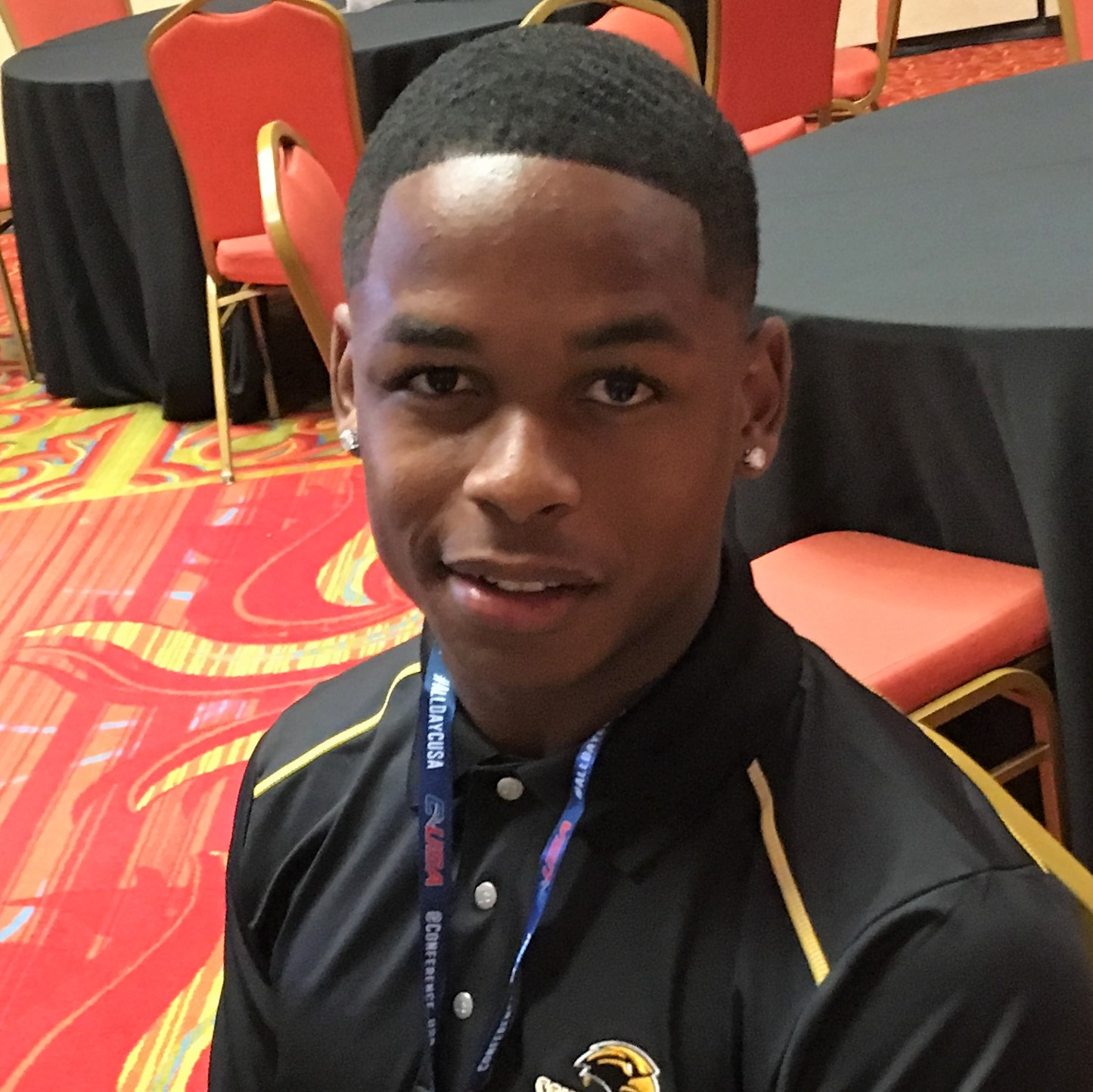
- Armstrong in 2017

Profile
- Position: Cornerback

Personal information
- Born: September 22, 1995 (age 31); Inglewood, California, U.S.
- Listed height: 5 ft 11 in (1.80 m)
- Listed weight: 185 lb (84 kg)

Career information
- High school: Bassfield (MS)
- College: Southern Miss (2014–2017)
- NFL draft: 2018: 6th round, 209th overall pick

Career history
- Miami Dolphins (2018); Houston Texans (2019–2020); Atlanta Falcons (2021–2022); Las Vegas Raiders (2023); Miami Dolphins (2025)

Career NFL statistics
- Total tackles: 45
- Pass deflections: 7
- Stats at Pro Football Reference

Cornell Orlando Armstrong (born September 22, 1995) is an American professional football cornerback. He played college football for the Southern Miss Golden Eagles.

== Early life ==
Armstrong attended Bassfield High School in Bassfield, Mississippi.

== College career ==
Armstrong played college football at Southern Miss.

== Professional career ==
Pre-draft measurables
Height	Weight	Arm length	Hand span	40-yard dash	10-yard split	20-yard split	20-yard shuttle	Three-cone drill	Vertical jump	Broad jump	Bench press
5 ft 11 1/8 in (1.81 m)	193 lb (88 kg)	30 1/8 in (0.77 m)	9 1/8 in (0.23 m)	4.45 s	1.51 s	2.52 s	4.28 s	7.00 s	37.5 in (0.95 m)	10 ft 5 in (3.18 m)	18 reps
All values from Pro Day

=== Miami Dolphins (first stint) ===
Armstrong was selected by the Miami Dolphins in the sixth round (209th overall) of the 2018 NFL draft. He was released during final roster cuts on August 31, 2019.

=== Houston Texans ===
On September 1, 2019, Armstrong signed a two-year contract with the Houston Texans. On September 10, he was waived and re-signed to the practice squad. He was promoted to the active roster on October 26.

Armstrong signed a contract extension with the Texans on March 1, 2021. He was waived/injured on August 30 and placed on injured reserve. Armstrong was released on September 7.

=== Atlanta Falcons ===
On December 7, 2021, Armstrong was signed to the Atlanta Falcons' practice squad.

He signed a reserve/future contract with the Falcons on January 10, 2022. He was placed on injured reserve on August 16. On August 24, Armstrong was released by the Falcons and re-signed to the practice squad on October 3. He was promoted to the active roster on October 29.

On March 20, 2023, Armstrong re-signed with the Falcons on a one-year deal. He was placed on injured reserve on August 29 and released on September 8.

=== Las Vegas Raiders ===
On October 10, 2023, Armstrong was signed to the Las Vegas Raiders' practice squad.

He signed a reserve/future contract on January 8, 2024. On August 27, Armstrong was waived by the Raiders as part of final roster cuts.

=== Miami Dolphins (second stint) ===
On July 24, 2025, Armstrong signed with the Miami Dolphins. On August 26, he was released as part of final roster cuts and signed to the practice squad the following day. On September 13, Armstrong was signed to the active roster. On October 10, he was released from injured reserve with an injury settlement.

== Personal life ==
In the aftermath of the 2020 Bassfield–Soso tornado, Armstrong and fellow high school teammates A. J. Moore and C. J. Moore donated supplies to 100 families in Jefferson Davis County.
