= Wilbur Myers =

American football player (born 1961)

No. 29
- Position: Defensive back

Personal information
- Born: August 17, 1961 (age 65); Bassfield, Mississippi, U.S.
- Listed height: 5 ft 11 in (1.80 m)
- Listed weight: 195 lb (88 kg)

Career information
- High school: Bassfield
- College: Delta State
- NFL draft: 1983: undrafted

Career history
- Denver Broncos (1983)
- Stats at Pro Football Reference

Wilbur Myers (born August 17, 1961) is an American former professional football player who was a defensive back for the Denver Broncos of the National Football League (NFL) in 1983. He played college football for the Delta State Statesmen.
