= A. J. Moore =

American football player (born 1995)

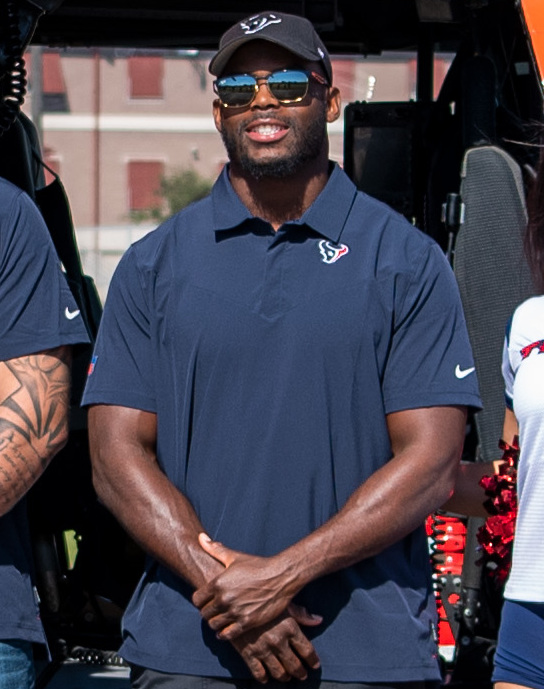
- Moore with the Houston Texans in 1990

Profile
- Position: Safety

Personal information
- Born: December 15, 1995 (age 30); Bassfield, Mississippi, U.S.
- Listed height: 5 ft 11 in (1.80 m)
- Listed weight: 202 lb (92 kg)

Career information
- High school: Bassfield
- College: Ole Miss (2014–2017)
- NFL draft: 2018: undrafted

Career history
- New England Patriots (2018)*; Houston Texans (2018–2021); Tennessee Titans (2022)
- * Offseason or practice squad member only

Career NFL statistics
- Total tackles: 69
- Sacks: 1.0
- Forced fumbles: 2
- Fumble recoveries: 1
- Stats at Pro Football Reference

Alvin James Moore Jr. (born December 15, 1995) is an American former professional football player who was a safety in the National Football League (NFL). He played college football for the Ole Miss Rebels.

== Early life ==
Moore was born and grew up in Bassfield, Mississippi, and attended Bassfield High School. He played both safety and running back for the Yellowjackets. As a senior, Moore was named first-team All-State by The Clarion-Ledger after he made 132 tackles, 11 tackles for loss and 3.5 sacks on defense and also rushed for five touchdowns as Bassfield went 15–1 and won the Class 2A state championship. He was a childhood friend and high school teammate of future Texans teammate Cornell Armstrong.

== College career ==
Moore played four seasons for the Rebels at the University of Mississippi, appearing in 39 games. Over the course of his collegiate career he accumulated 132 tackles, 10.5 tackles for loss, 2 forced fumbles, and 5 passes deflected. As a senior, Moore started all 12 of the Rebels' games at nickleback and registered 48 tackles, as well as a sack, a fumble recovery, and three passes deflected.

== Professional career ==
Pre-draft measurables
Height	Weight	Arm length	Hand span	40-yard dash	10-yard split	20-yard split	20-yard shuttle	Three-cone drill	Vertical jump	Broad jump	Bench press
5 ft 11 1/4 in (1.81 m)	200 lb (91 kg)	32 1/8 in (0.82 m)	8 3/4 in (0.22 m)	4.40 s	1.54 s	2.64 s	4.38 s	7.27 s	34.0 in (0.86 m)	10 ft 2 in (3.10 m)	17 reps
All values from Pro Day

=== New England Patriots ===
Moore signed with the New England Patriots as an undrafted free agent on April 30, 2018. He was waived by the Patriots at the end of the preseason as part of the team's final roster cuts.

=== Houston Texans ===
Moore was claimed off waivers by the Houston Texans on September 2, 2018. He made his NFL debut on September 9, during the Texans' season opener against the New England Patriots. In his rookie season, Moore appeared in all 16 of the Texans regular season games, playing exclusively on special teams and making a team-leading 11 tackles with one fumble recovery. In 2019, Moore played in all 16 of the Texans' regular season games, appearing mostly on special teams but also playing 19 snaps on defense, with 14 total tackles and also played in both of the team's postseason games with one special teams tackle.

Moore was named a team captain by the Texans for the 2020 season. He was placed on injured reserve with a hamstring injury on September 28, 2020. Moore was activated on November 14. In Week 13 against the Indianapolis Colts, Moore recorded his first career sack on Philip Rivers during the 26–20 loss.

The Texans placed a restricted free agent tender on Moore on March 17, 2021. He signed the one-year contract on April 7. Moore was placed on injured reserve on September 2. He was activated on October 2.

=== Tennessee Titans ===
On March 21, 2022, Moore signed a one-year contract with the Tennessee Titans. He was placed on injured reserve on September 13.

On July 26, 2023, Moore re-signed with the Titans. He was waived on August 20.

== Personal life ==
Moore has an identical twin brother, C. J. Moore, who was also a defensive back on the Ole Miss football team and played for the Detroit Lions. They played in the same defensive backfield for the Rebels.
