= Bassfield, Mississippi =

- Town
- Location of Bassfield, Mississippi

- Location in the United States
- Coordinates: 31°29′50″N 89°44′46″W
- Country: United States
- State: Mississippi
- County: Jefferson Davis

Area
  - Total: 1.00 sq mi (2.59 km^{2})
  - Land: 1.00 sq mi (2.59 km^{2})
  - Water: 0 sq mi (0.00 km^{2})
- Elevation: 456 ft (139 m)

Population (2020)
  - Total: 192
  - Density: 192.0/sq mi (74.13/km^{2})
- Time zone: UTC-6 (Central (CST))
  - Summer (DST): UTC-5 (CDT)
- ZIP code: 39421
- Area code: 601
- FIPS code: 28-03580
- GNIS feature ID: 0666563
- Website: townofbassfieldms.com

Bassfield is a town in Jefferson Davis County, Mississippi, United States. The population was 192 at the 2020 census, down from 254 at the 2010 census.

== Geography ==
Bassfield is located in southeastern Jefferson Davis County at 31°29′50″N 89°44′46″W (31.497090, -89.746008). Mississippi Highway 42 passes through the town, leading northwest 11 miles (18 km) to Prentiss, the county seat, and southeast 14 miles (23 km) to Sumrall. Mississippi Highway 35 passes through the west side of Bassfield, leading north 21 miles (34 km) to Mount Olive and south 19 miles (31 km) to Columbia.

According to the United States Census Bureau, Bassfield has a total area of 1.1 square miles (2.8 km^{2}), all land.

== Tornado history ==
On April 12, 2020, at approximately 4:15 CDT, areas east of Bassfield were struck by a large, violent EF4 tornado, causing catastrophic damage. The town just barely avoided being hit again when a large EF3 tornado passed just north of the city only 35 minutes later.

Almost five years later on March 15, 2025, at approximately 12:45 PM CDT, another large, violent, and long tracked EF4 tornado passed just east of the town.

== Demographics ==
=== 2020 census ===
At the 2020 census, there was 192 people, 103 housing units, and 118 families in the town.

=== 2000 census ===
Historical population
Census	Pop.	Note	%±
1910	344		—
1920	265		−23.0%
1930	334		26.0%
1940	277		−17.1%
1950	320		15.5%
1960	295		−7.8%
1970	354		20.0%
1980	325		−8.2%
1990	249		−23.4%
2000	315		26.5%
2010	254		−19.4%
2020	192		−24.4%
U.S. Decennial Census

As of the census of 2000, there were 315 people, 124 households, and 76 families residing in the town. The population density was 290.4 inhabitants per square mile (112.1/km^{2}). There were 144 housing units at an average density of 132.8 per square mile (51.3/km^{2}). The racial makeup of the town was 64.13% White, 35.56% African American and 0.32% Native American. Hispanic or Latino of any race were 1.27% of the population.

There were 124 households, out of which 24.2% had children under the age of 18 living with them, 41.9% were married couples living together, 16.1% had a female householder with no husband present, and 38.7% were non-families. 36.3% of all households were made up of individuals, and 20.2% had someone living alone who was 65 years of age or older. The average household size was 2.31 and the average family size was 3.08.

In the town, the population was spread out, with 20.3% under the age of 18, 9.2% from 18 to 24, 23.2% from 25 to 44, 19.0% from 45 to 64, and 28.3% who were 65 years of age or older. The median age was 43 years. For every 100 females, there were 71.2 males. For every 100 females age 18 and over, there were 69.6 males.

The median income for a household in the town was $18,500, and the median income for a family was $27,500. Males had a median income of $17,292 versus $14,250 for females. The per capita income for the town was $13,283. About 22.7% of families and 25.0% of the population were below the poverty line, including 24.1% of those under age 18 and 34.8% of those age 65 or over.

== Education ==
Bassfield is served by the Jefferson Davis County School District, which is among the lowest performing in the state by certain metrics, according to an analysis by ProPublica.

== Notable residents ==
- Cornell Armstrong, professional football player
- A. J. Moore, professional football player
- C. J. Moore, professional football player
- Wilbur Myers, former defensive back for the Denver Broncos
- Ronnie Shows, U.S. congressman (1999–2003)

== Gallery ==
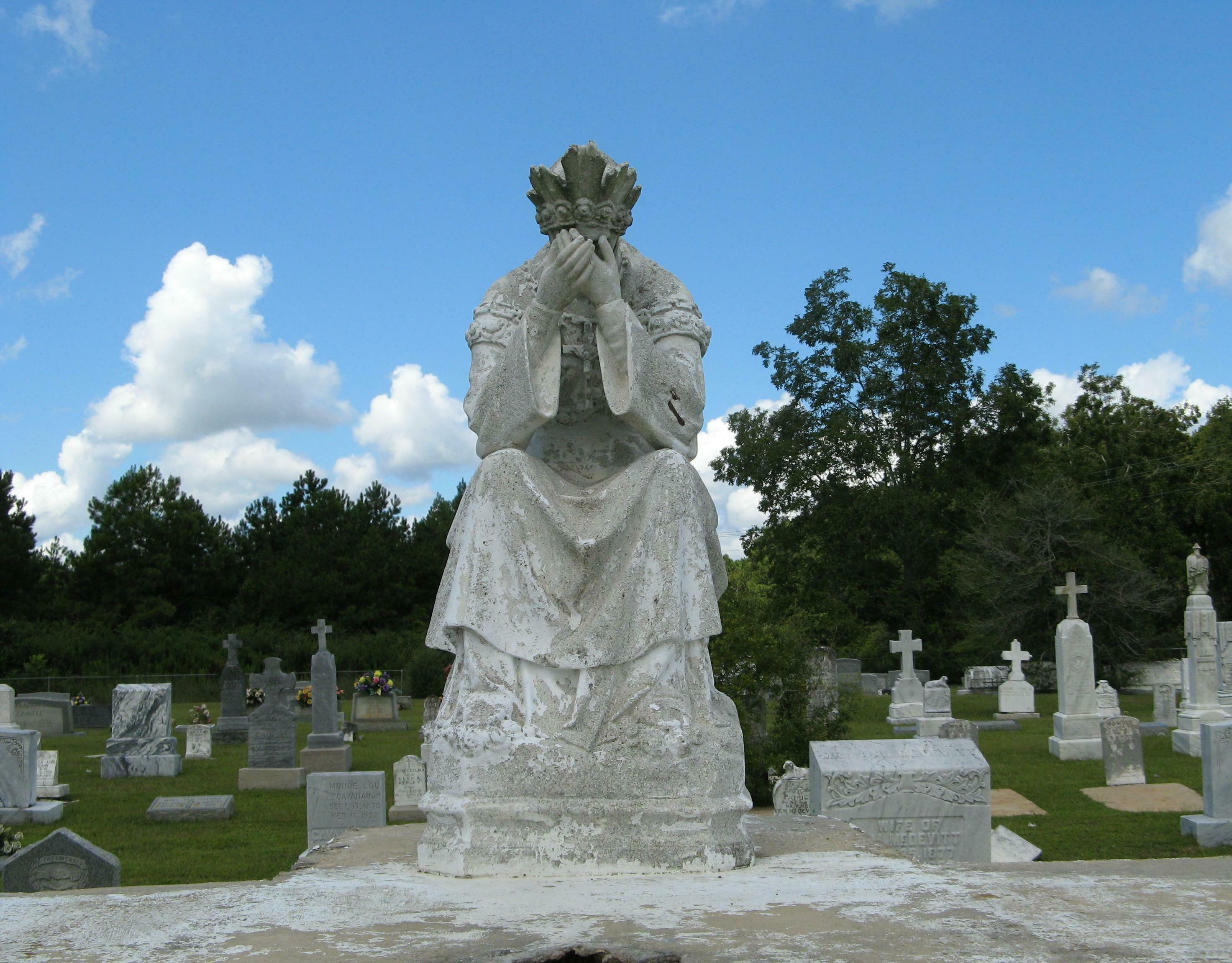
Grief, statue at the Bassfield Catholic Cemetery
