= National Weather Service Jackson, Kentucky =

National Weather Service Jackson, based in Jackson, Kentucky, is a weather forecast office responsible for monitoring weather conditions for 33 counties in Eastern Kentucky. The National Weather Service chose to put a weather forecast office (WFO) in eastern Kentucky due to the flooding of April 2-5, 1977. The National Weather Service Jackson, Kentucky has been forecasting for portions of Eastern Kentucky since 1981.

== History ==
Construction on the new Weather Service office near Jackson took place through late 1979 into 1980 and the office was officially commissioned January 1, 1981.

National Weather Service in Jackson, Kentucky operated as a "Weather Service Office" or WSO from the 1980s into the early 1990s, issuing warnings for 17 counties in East and Southeast Kentucky. A restructuring and modernization of the National Weather Service began in the mid-1990s. Modernization was needed to make use of new technology such as the WSR-88D Doppler weather radar and the Advanced Weather Interactive Processing System (AWIPS). During construction, some of operations were moved into a temporary office in a single-wide trailer. The observing function remained in the old building, while the warning function of the office moved into the trailer below the radar tower. Communication between the dual offices was conducted by telephone. After installing the antenna for the WSR-88D radar at WSO Jackson, the tower for the old WSR-74S was then removed.

== NOAA Weather Radio ==
Regular broadcasts are tailored to weather information for Eastern Kentucky. Information, such as hydrological forecasts and climatological data are broadcast. During severe weather, National Weather Service forecasters can interrupt the routine weather broadcasts and insert special warning messages concerning imminent threat to life and property. National Weather Service Jackson, Kentucky forecast office provides programming for 20 NOAA Weather Radio stations in Kentucky.

| City of license | Call sign | Frequency (MHz) |
|---|---|---|
| Somerset | KIH44 | 162.550 MHz |
| Mount Vernon | WWG70 | 162.425 MHz |
| London | WWG65 | 162.475 MHz |
| Williamsburg | WWG78 | 162.500 MHz |
| Monticello | WWG80 | 162.425 MHz |
| Morehead | WWG71 | 162.400 MHz |
| Stanton | WWG61 | 162.550 MHz |
| Frenchburg | WWG63 | 162.475 MHz |
| West Liberty | WWG79 | 162.450 MHz |
| Irvine | WNG727 | 162.475 MHz |
| Hazard | KIH40 | 162.475 MHz |
| Jackson | WWG26 | 162.425 MHz |
| Manchester | WWG66 | 162.400 MHz |
| Harlan | WWG68 | 162.450 MHz |
| Pikeville | WWG69 | 162.400 MHz |
| Paintsville | WWG28 | 162.525 MHz |
| McKee | WWG64 | 162.450 MHz |
| Pineville | WWG62 | 162.525 MHz |
| Phelps | WWG81 | 162.500 MHz |
| Beattyville | WWG67 | 162.500 MHz |
