= Moss, Mississippi =

- Unincorporated community
- Location within Mississippi Location within the United States
- Coordinates: 31°48′55″N 89°10′40″W
- Country: United States
- State: Mississippi
- County: Jasper
- Elevation: 299 ft (91 m)
- Time zone: UTC-6 (Central (CST))
  - Summer (DST): UTC-5 (CDT)
- Zip code: 39460
- Area codes: 601 & 769
- GNIS feature ID: 668537

Moss is an unincorporated community in Jasper County, Mississippi, United States.

== History ==
Moss is located on the former Gulf, Mobile and Ohio Railroad. The community is named for Captain B. F. Moss. The railroad stop was known as Mossville, but the post office was known as Moss. Moss was formerly home to two general stores.

A post office first began operation under the name Moss in 1904.

=== Tornado history ===
On April 12, 2020, nearly every structure in town was damaged and numerous homes were destroyed when a large, violent EF4 tornado moved directly through town. The path of the tornado mirrored that of a long-tracked F3 tornado that struck the south side of town on April 21, 1951, also causing severe damage.
