= C. J. Moore =

American football player (born 1995)

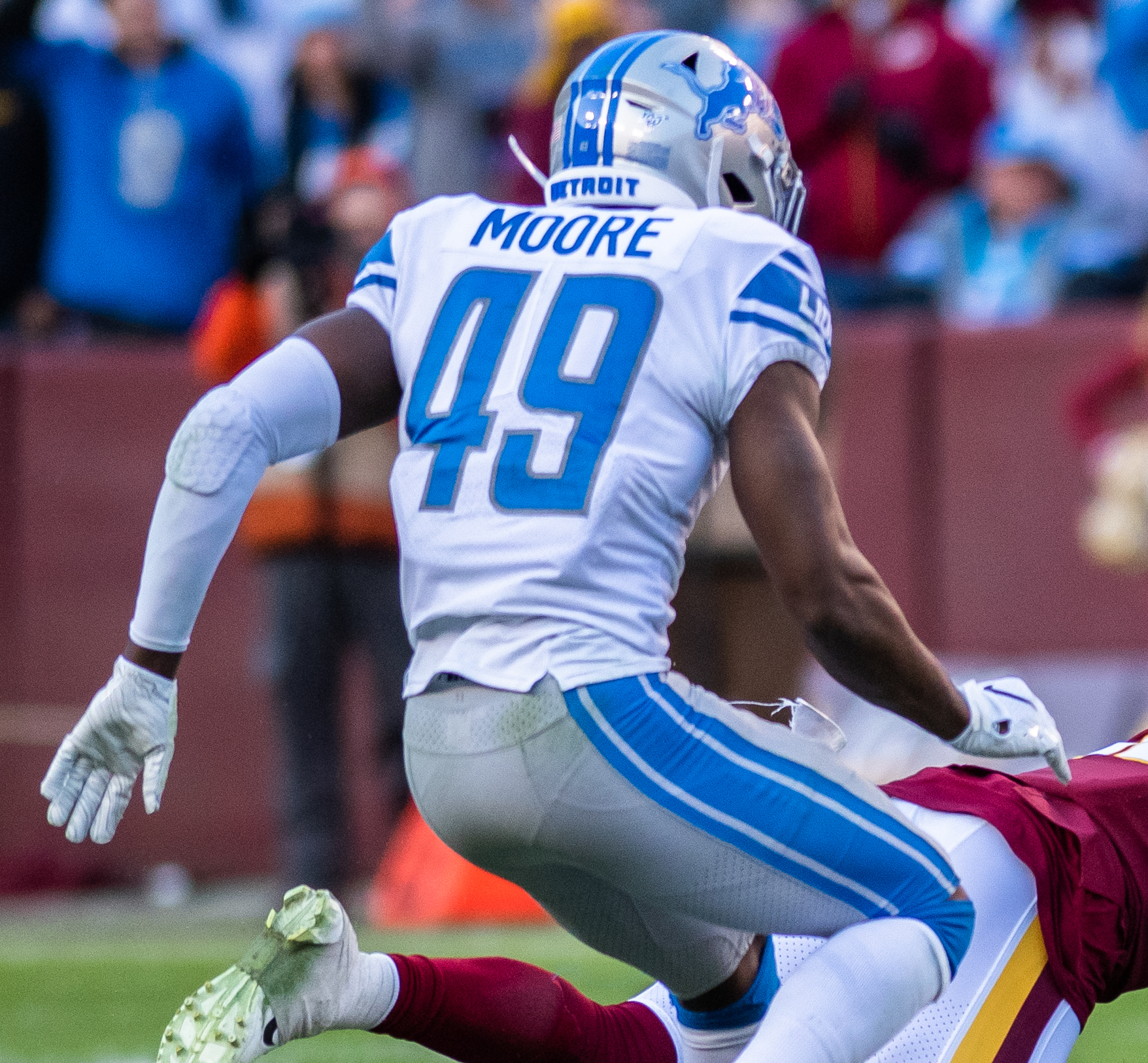
- Moore with the Detroit Lions in 2019

No. 49, 38
- Position: Safety

Personal information
- Born: December 15, 1995 (age 30); Bassfield, Mississippi, U.S.
- Listed height: 5 ft 11 in (1.80 m)
- Listed weight: 197 lb (89 kg)

Career information
- High school: Bassfield
- College: Ole Miss (2014–2018)
- NFL draft: 2019: undrafted

Career history
- Detroit Lions (2019–2021); Houston Texans (2022)*; Detroit Lions (2022, 2024)
- * Offseason or practice squad member only

Career NFL statistics
- Total tackles: 48
- Fumble recoveries: 1
- Pass deflections: 2
- Interceptions: 1
- Stats at Pro Football Reference

Calvin J. Moore (born December 15, 1995) is an American former professional football player who was a safety in the National Football League (NFL). He played college football for the Ole Miss Rebels.

== Early life ==
Moore was born and grew up in Bassfield, Mississippi and attended Bassfield High School. He played both linebacker and quarterback for the Yellowjackets. As a senior, Moore made 32 tackles (four for loss) and 3 interceptions on defense and passed for 1,194 yards and 15 touchdowns, while rushing for 318 yards and 13 touchdowns on offense as Bassfield went 15-1 and won the Class 2A state championship.

== College career ==
Moore was a member of the Ole Miss Rebels for five seasons, playing on special teams and as a reserve defensive back for his first two seasons before missing his junior season due to a torn pectoral muscle in training camp. He became a starter for the Rebels during his redshirt junior, making 51 tackles and leading the team with three interceptions and received the 2018 Chucky Mullins Courage Award. Moore began his redshirt senior season as Ole Miss's starting safety before suffering a second season-ending torn pectoral muscle after five games.

== Professional career ==
Pre-draft measurables
Height	Weight	Arm length	Hand span	40-yard dash	10-yard split	20-yard split	20-yard shuttle	Three-cone drill	Vertical jump	Broad jump
5 ft 11 1/8 in (1.81 m)	196 lb (89 kg)	32 1/4 in (0.82 m)	8 5/8 in (0.22 m)	4.43 s	1.52 s	2.68 s	4.44 s	7.08 s	37.0 in (0.94 m)	10 ft 4 in (3.15 m)
All values from Pro Day

=== Detroit Lions (first stint) ===
Moore signed with the Detroit Lions as an undrafted free agent on May 10, 2019. He made his NFL Debut on September 8, 2019, against the Arizona Cardinals, playing exclusively on special teams and making one tackle. Moore played in all 16 of the Lions games with seven tackles during his rookie season.

On March 14, 2022, Moore re-signed with the Lions. He was waived/injured on August 30, and placed on injured reserve. Moore was released by Detroit on September 5.

=== Houston Texans ===
On October 18, 2022, Moore signed with the practice squad of the Houston Texans.

=== Detroit Lions (second stint) ===
On October 25, 2022, Moore was signed by the Lions off of the Texans' practice squad.

On March 18, 2023, Moore signed a two-year contract extension with the Lions.

On April 21, 2023, Moore was suspended indefinitely (at least one season) after it was discovered he had violated the league’s gambling policy by betting on NFL games. He was subsequently released by the Lions following the incident.

On April 18, 2024, Moore was reinstated by the league. He was re-signed by the Lions on May 7. Moore was waived on August 27, and was subsequently re-signed to the practice squad, but released the next day.

== Personal life ==
Moore has an identical twin brother, A. J. Moore, who was also a defensive back on the Ole Miss football team and is now an NFL free agent who formerly played for the Tennessee Titans. They played in the same defensive backfield for the Rebels.
